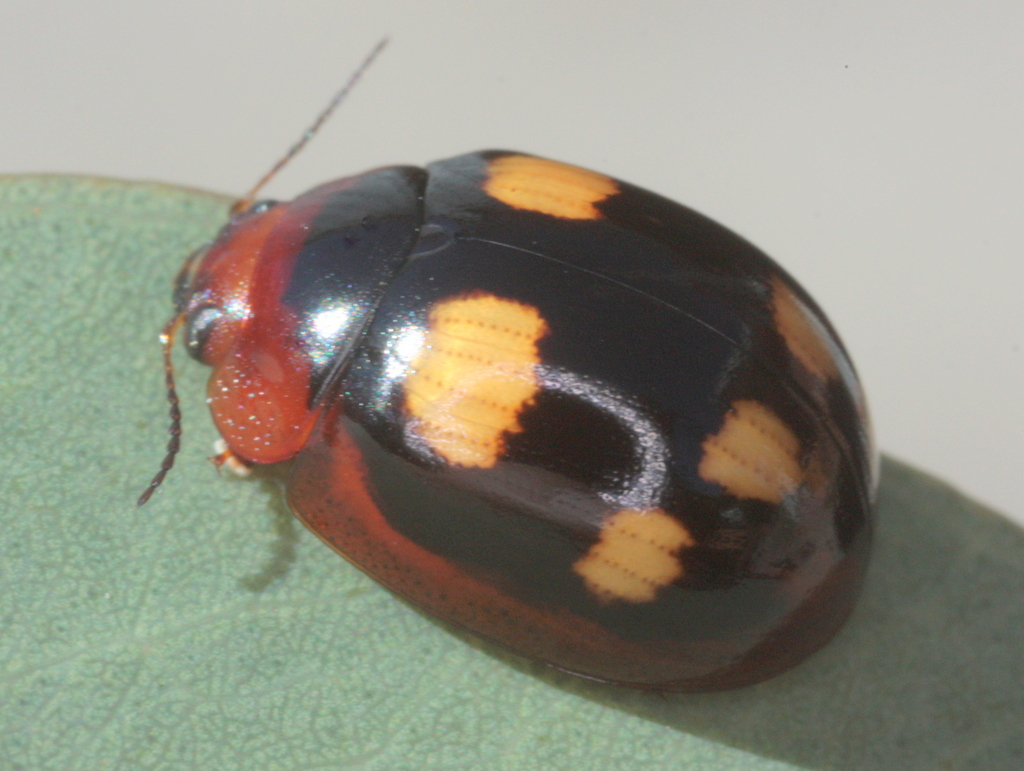
- Paropsisterna beata

Scientific classification
- Domain: Eukaryota
- Kingdom: Animalia
- Phylum: Arthropoda
- Class: Insecta
- Order: Coleoptera
- Suborder: Polyphaga
- Infraorder: Cucujiformia
- Family: Chrysomelidae
- Tribe: Chrysomelini
- Genus: Paropsisterna; Motschulsky, 1860

Type species
- Notoclea sexpustulata Marsham, 1808

Species
- see text

Synonyms
- Chrysophtharta Weise, 1901; Niliosoma Motschulsky, 1860; Sterromela Weise, 1915; Xanthogramma Weise, 1923 (nec Schiner, 1860)

= Paropsisterna =

Genus of beetles

Paropsisterna is a genus of leaf beetles indigenous to Papua New Guinea and Australia. There are over 120 species, many with bright aposematic colours, and many feeding on Eucalyptus leaves.

The genus was described by Victor Motschulsky in 1860.

== Description ==
Paropsisterna are beetles 3-17 mm long with bodies semicircular to elongate-ovate and moderately to strongly convex. The frontoclypeal suture is rounded or V-shaped, and lacks lateral ridges. The apical maxillary palpomere is strongly expanded from base to truncate apex. The pronotum is broadest at its base. The procoxal cavity is open with a gap at least half the width of the procoxa. The mid and hind tibiae have at least one sharp external longitudinal keel. The tarsal claws are usually acutely toothed, rarely simple.

Some species are very colourful, but their colours may fade after death.

== Diet ==
This genus of beetles feeds on plants in family Myrtaceae, including Acmena, Agonis, Angophora, Baeckea, Callistemon, Darwinia, Eucalyptus, Kunzea, Leptospermum and Melaleuca. There are also records from Acacia (which is in family Fabaceae), but these are likely to be erroneous or related to casual collecting.

== Notable species ==
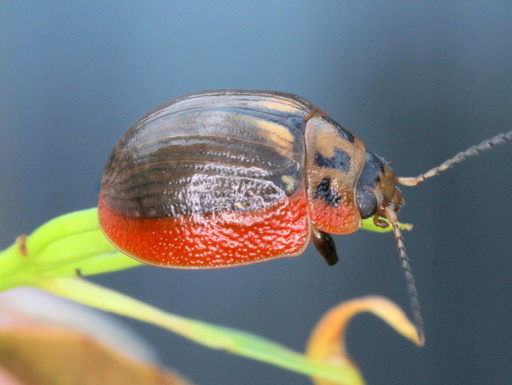
Paropsisterna agricola

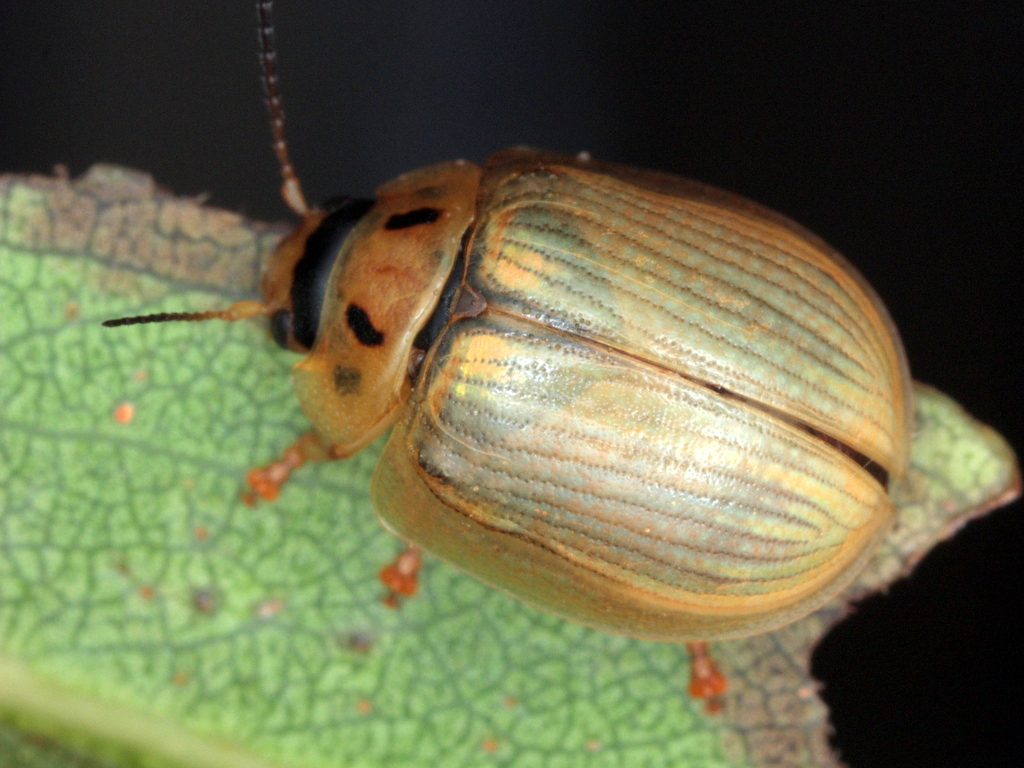
Paropsisterna bimaculata

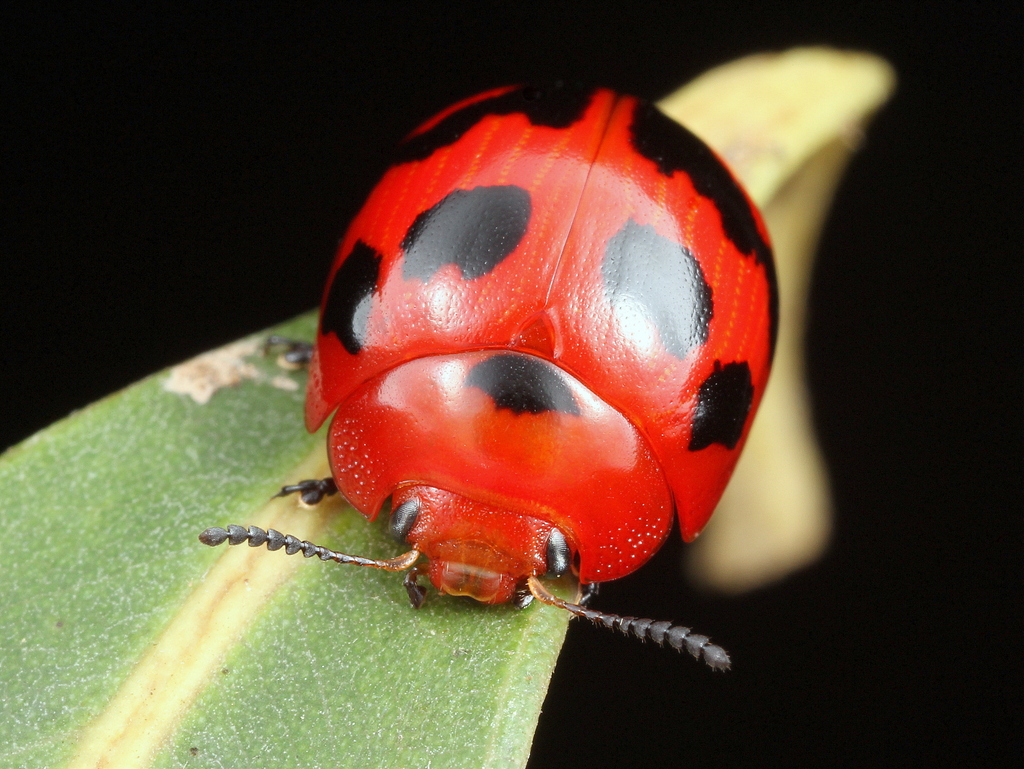
Paropsisterna octomaculata

- Paropsisterna agricola a pest on Eucalyptus globulus, E. delegatensis and E. dalrympleana
- Paropsisterna bimaculata a pest on Eucalyptus regnans, E. obliqua and E. delegatensis
- Paropsisterna m-fuscum a pest on Eucalyptus globulus
- Paropsisterna obovata a pest on Eucalyptus in South Australia
- Paropsisterna selmani a pest on Eucalyptus in Tasmania, introduced to the Republic of Ireland and the United Kingdom.
- Paropsisterna tigrina proposed as a biological control agent of the invasive Australian Paperbark Tree Melaleuca quinquenervia in Florida.
- Paropsisterna variicollis a pest on Eucalyptus globulus

== List of species ==
As of 2006, Pariosisterna includes the species that were once in genera Niliosoma Motschulsky, Sterromela Weise, Chrysophtharta Weise and Xanthogramma Weise (note the last of these is also a junior homonym of Xanthogramma Schiner, an invalid but available name).

- Paropsisterna aequalis (Chapuis, 1877)
- Paropsisterna agricola (Chapuis, 1877)
- Paropsisterna albicans (Chapuis, 1877)
- Paropsisterna ambigua Daccordi, 2003
- Paropsisterna amica (Newman, 1842)
- Paropsisterna amoena (Clark, 1865)
- Paropsisterna angustipes (Blackburn, 1898)
- Paropsisterna annularis (Blackburn, 1899)
- Paropsisterna anomala (Blackburn, 1901)
- Paropsisterna atalanta (Blackburn, 1898)
- Paropsisterna aurea (Blackburn, 1899)
- Paropsisterna basalis (Chapuis, 1877)
- Paropsisterna beata (Newman, 1842)
- Paropsisterna bimaculata (Olivier, 1807)
- Paropsisterna brunnea (Marsham, 1808)
- Paropsisterna captiosa (Clark, 1866)
- Paropsisterna cassidoides (Boisduval, 1835)
- Paropsisterna cernua (Chapuis, 1877)
- Paropsisterna chlorotica (Olivier, 1807)
- Paropsisterna citrina (Chapuis, 1877)
- Paropsisterna cloelia (Stål, 1860)
- Paropsisterna coccineipennis (Weise, 1916)
- Paropsisterna complexa (Chapuis, 1877)
- Paropsisterna conferta (Chapuis, 1877)
- Paropsisterna conjugata (Chapuis, 1877)
- Paropsisterna crocata (Boisduval, 1835)
- Paropsisterna debilis (Chapuis, 1877)
- Paropsisterna decolorata (Chapuis, 1877)
- Paropsisterna defecta (Chapuis, 1877)
- Paropsisterna deflorata (Chapuis, 1877)
- Paropsisterna delmastroi Daccordi, 2003
- Paropsisterna detrita (Fabricius, 1775)
- Paropsisterna difficilis (Blackburn, 1898)
- Paropsisterna dulcior (Blackburn, 1898)
- Paropsisterna elliptica (Chapuis, 1877)
- Paropsisterna erudita (Newman, 1842)
- Paropsisterna fastidiosa (Chapuis, 1877)
- Paropsisterna flaveola (Chapuis, 1877)
- Paropsisterna flavolimbata Daccordi, 2003
- Paropsisterna fulvoguttata (Baly, 1866)
- Paropsisterna fuscula (Chapuis, 1877)
- Paropsisterna galatea (Blackburn, 1898)
- Paropsisterna gemina (Chapuis, 1877)
- Paropsisterna geniculata (Boisduval, 1835)
- Paropsisterna giachinoi Daccordi, 2003
- Paropsisterna gloriosa (Blackburn, 1899)
- Paropsisterna hackeri Daccordi, 2003
- Paropsisterna hectica (Boisduval, 1835)
- Paropsisterna incerta (Chapuis, 1877)
- Paropsisterna inconstans (Blackburn, 1899)
- Paropsisterna insignita (Newman, 1842)
- Paropsisterna inspersa (Newman, 1842)
- Paropsisterna intacta (Newman, 1842)
- Paropsisterna interlita (Newman, 1842)
- Paropsisterna interrupta (Chapuis, 1877)
- Paropsisterna interstitialis (Chapuis, 1877)
- Paropsisterna intertincta (Clark, 1865)
- Paropsisterna io (Blackburn, 1898)
- Paropsisterna irina (Chapuis, 1877)
- Paropsisterna irrisa (Newman, 1842)
- Paropsisterna jawoyna Daccordi, 2003
- Paropsisterna laesa (Germar, 1848)
- Paropsisterna lignea (Erichson, 1842)
- Paropsisterna lineata (Marsham, 1808)
- Paropsisterna liturata (Marsham, 1808)
- Paropsisterna m-fuscum (Boheman, 1859)
- Paropsisterna maculicollis (Clark, 1865)
- Paropsisterna madida (Blackburn, 1898)
- Paropsisterna mentitrix (Blackburn, 1898)
- Paropsisterna mera (Chapuis, 1877)
- Paropsisterna minerva (Blackburn, 1899)
- Paropsisterna morio (Fabricius, 1787)
- Paropsisterna nigerrima (Germar, 1848)
- Paropsisterna nigrita (Chapuis, 1877)
- Paropsisterna nigrostillata (Chapuis, 1877)
- Paropsisterna nigrovittata (Chapuis, 1877)
- Paropsisterna nobilitata (Erichson, 1842)
- Paropsisterna notabilis (Blackburn, 1896)
- Paropsisterna nucea (Erichson, 1842)
- Paropsisterna nupta (Blackburn, 1898)
- Paropsisterna obliterata (Erichson, 1842)
- Paropsisterna obovata (Chapuis, 1877)
- Paropsisterna octolineata (Gory, 1833)
- Paropsisterna octomaculata (Marsham, 1808)
- Paropsisterna octosignata (Stål, 1860)
- Paropsisterna opaciceps (Blackburn, 1898)
- Paropsisterna pachyta (Chapuis, 1877)
- Paropsisterna pallida (Olivier, 1807)
- Paropsisterna philomela (Blackburn, 1901)
- Paropsisterna pictipes (Chapuis, 1877)
- Paropsisterna pluvialis (Chapuis, 1877)
- Paropsisterna polyglypta (Germar, 1848)
- Paropsisterna polyxo (Blackburn, 1901)
- Paropsisterna proxima (Chapuis, 1877)
- Paropsisterna pulverulenta (Blackburn, 1898)
- Paropsisterna purpureoaurea (Clark, 1865)
- Paropsisterna purpureoviridis Clark, 1864
- Paropsisterna raucicollis (Blackburn, 1899)
- Paropsisterna remota (Germar, 1848)
- Paropsisterna rufescens (Chapuis, 1877)
- Paropsisterna rufipes (Fabricius, 1801)
- Paropsisterna rufobrunnea (Blackburn, 1898)
- Paropsisterna selmani Reid & de Little, 2013
- Paropsisterna semifumata (Blackburn, 1901)
- Paropsisterna seminigripes (Lea, 1924)
- Paropsisterna semivittata (Blackburn, 1898)
- Paropsisterna sexpustulata (Marsham, 1808)
- Paropsisterna simsoni (Blackburn, 1899)
- Paropsisterna spadicea Weise, 1916
- Paropsisterna stictica (Marsham, 1808)
- Paropsisterna stygia (Chapuis, 1877)
- Paropsisterna subcincta (Blackburn, 1898)
- Paropsisterna subcostata (Chapuis, 1877)
- Paropsisterna suspiciosa (Baly, 1866)
- Paropsisterna tenebrosa (Chapuis, 1877)
- Paropsisterna tenella (Chapuis, 1877)
- Paropsisterna tessellata (Clark, 1865)
- Paropsisterna testacea (Olivier, 1807)
- Paropsisterna tigrina (Chapuis, 1877)
- Paropsisterna trimaculata (Chapuis, 1877)
- Paropsisterna variabilis (Chapuis, 1877)
- Paropsisterna variicollis (Chapuis, 1877)
- Paropsisterna vittata (Blackburn, 1899)

== Gallery ==
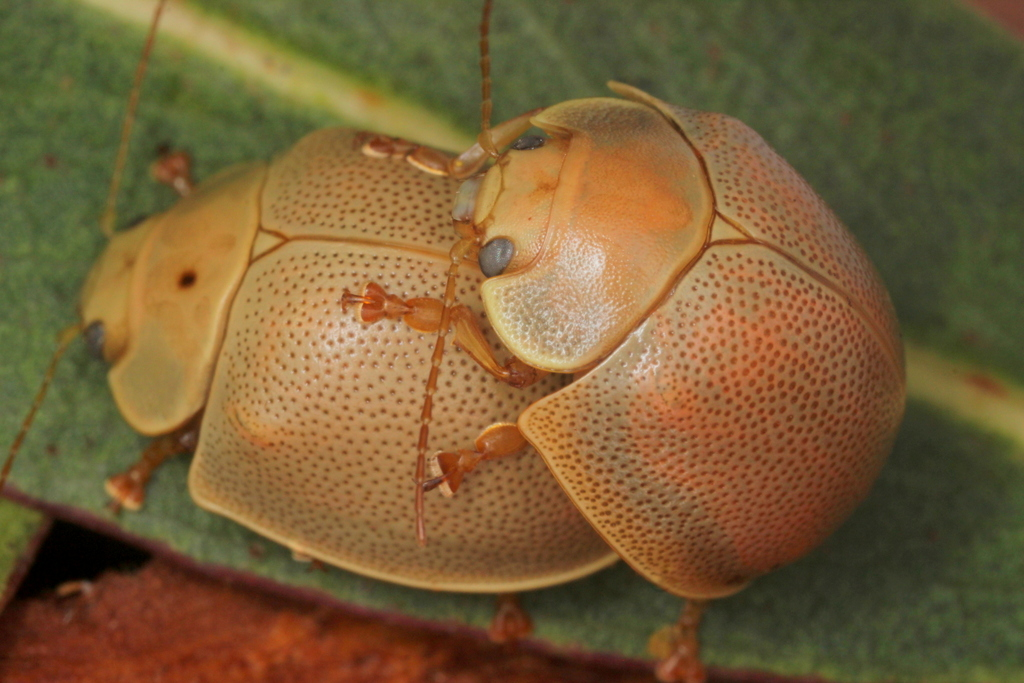
Paropsisterna crocata

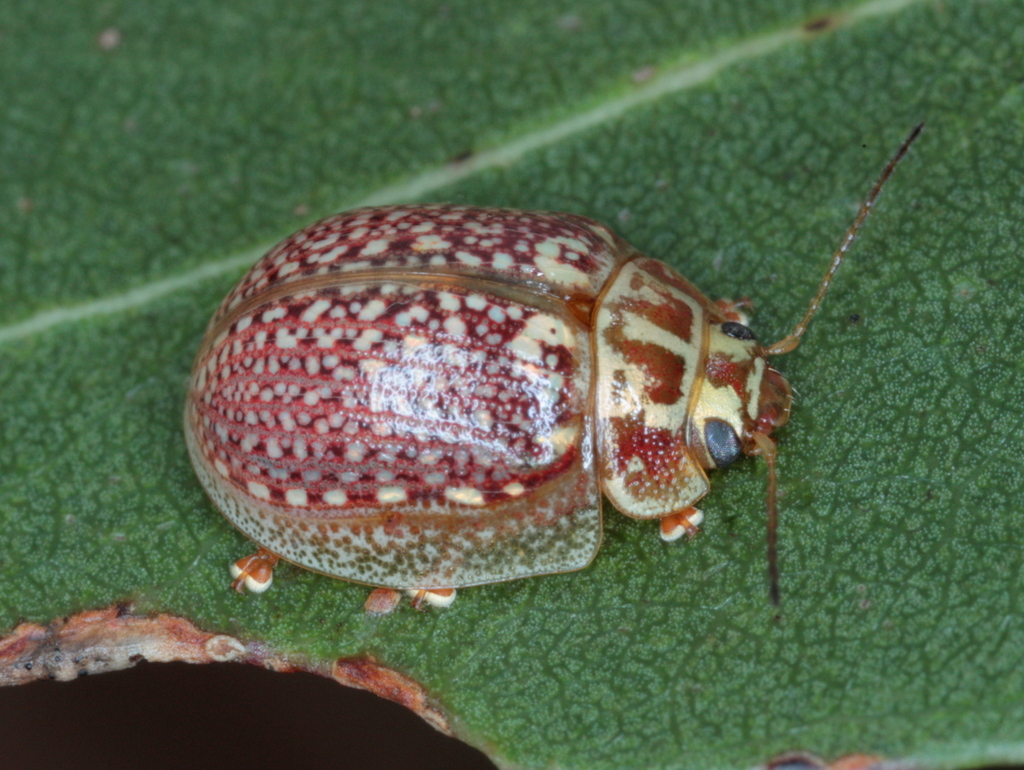
Paropsisterna decolorata

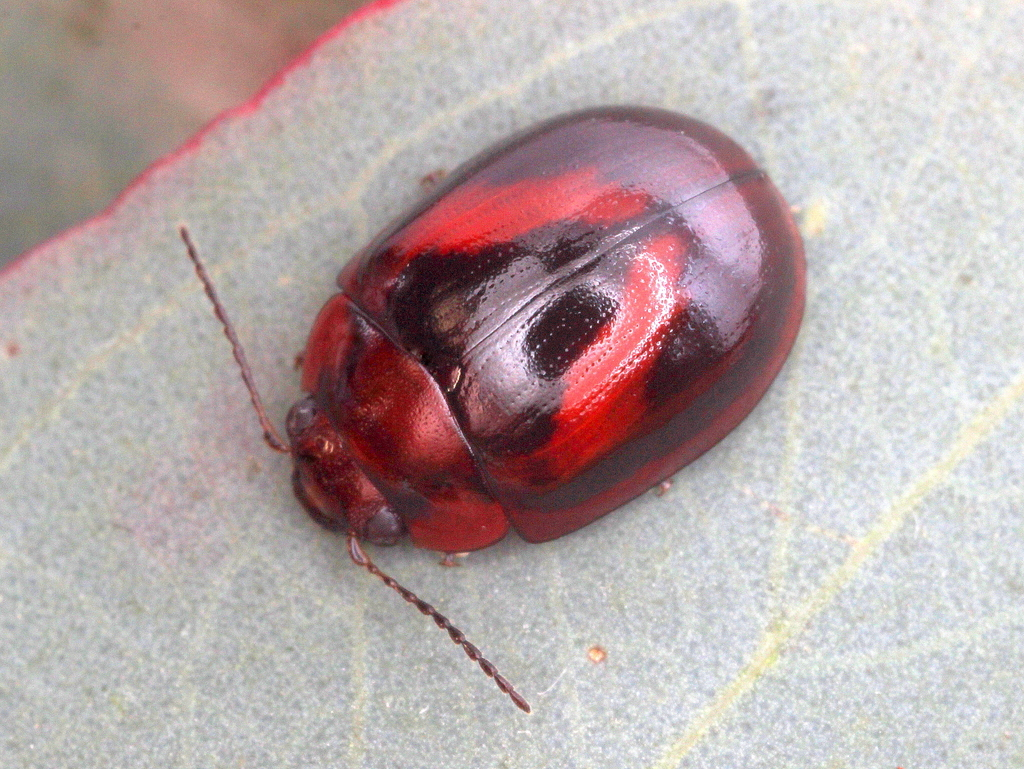
Paropsisterna erudita

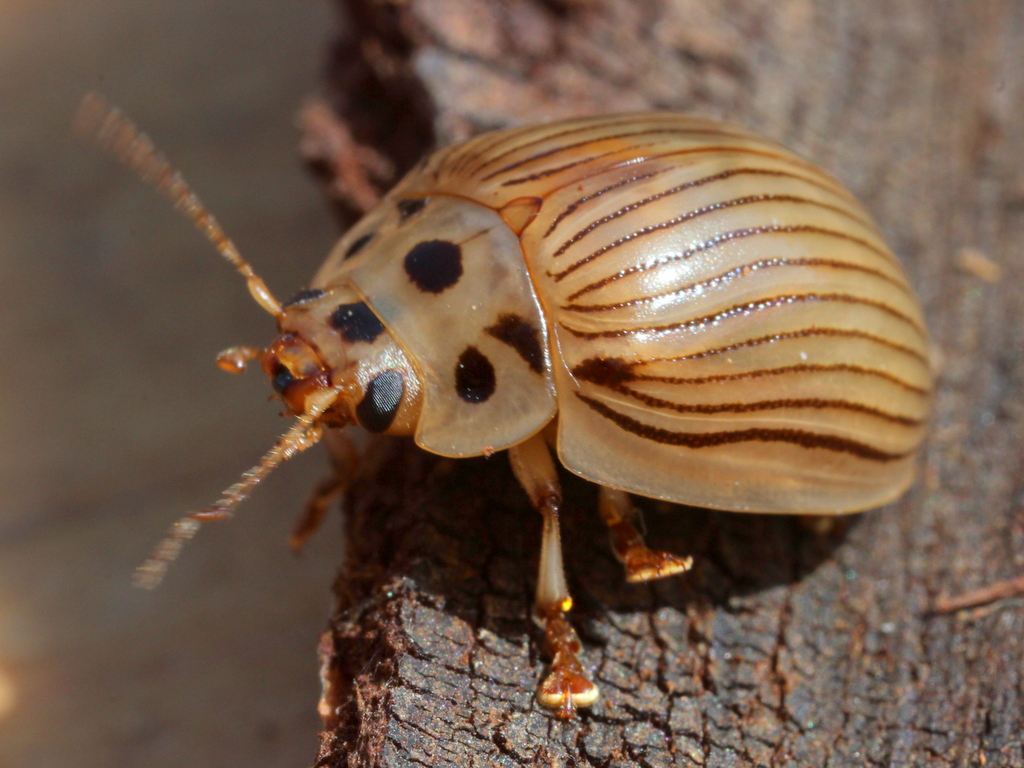
Paropsisterna intacta

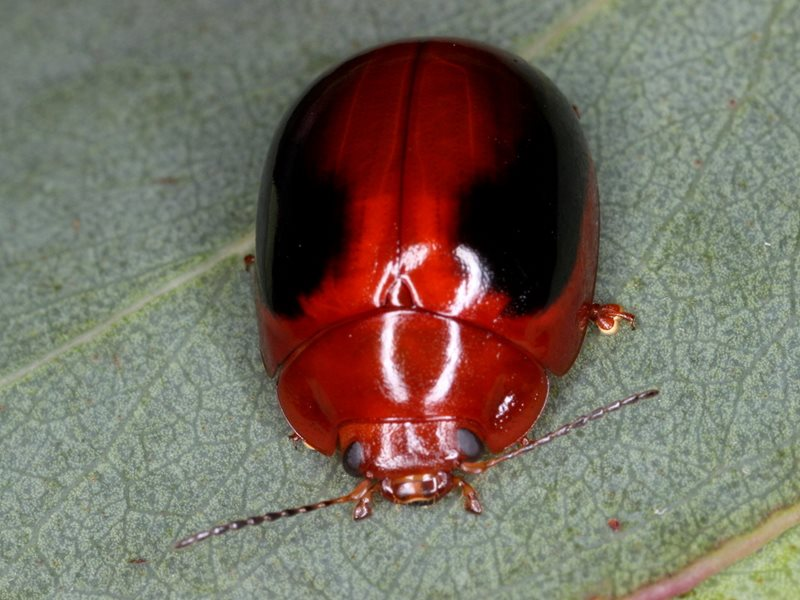
Paropsisterna liturata

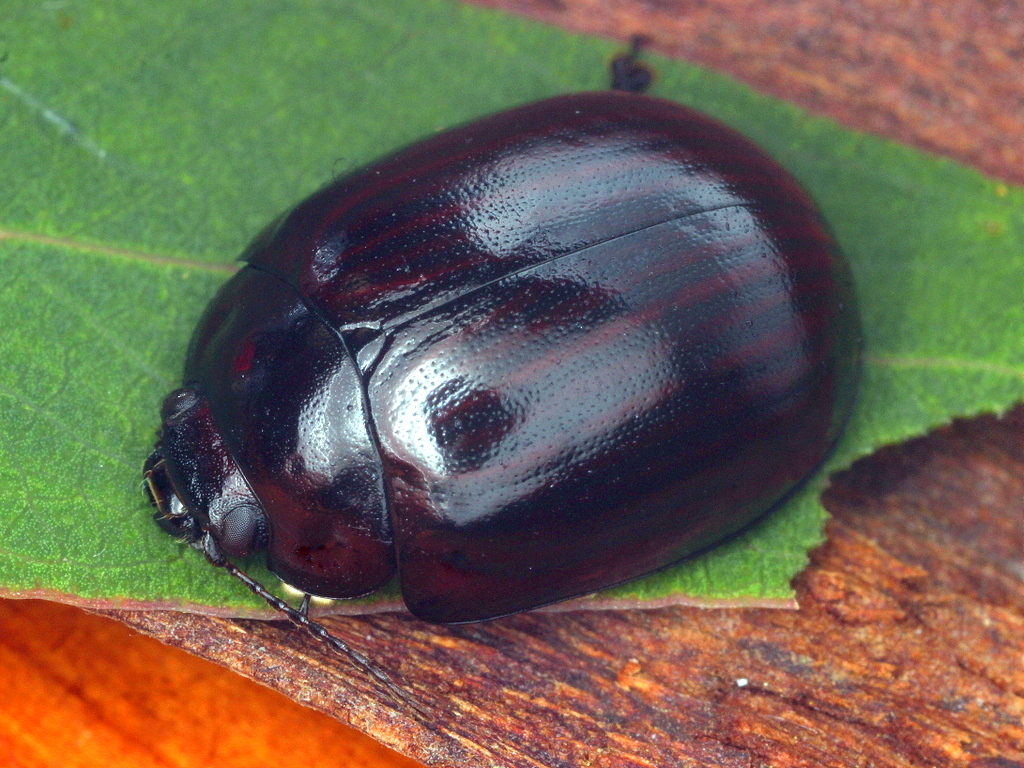
Paropsisterna morio

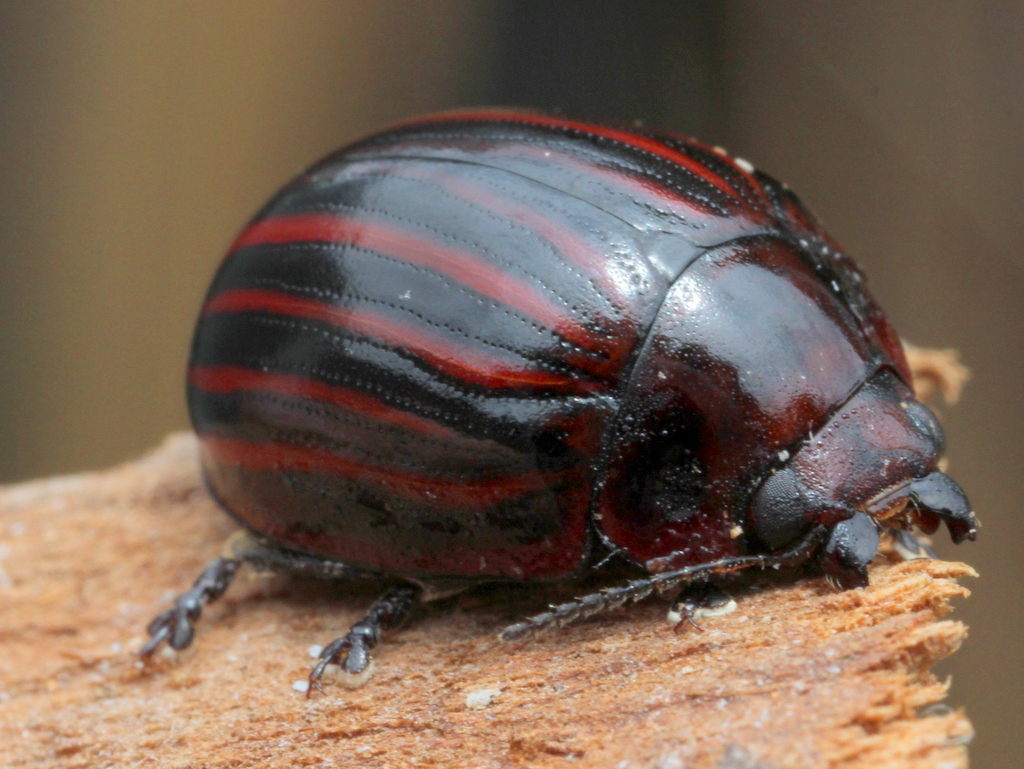
Paropsisterna nigerrima alternata

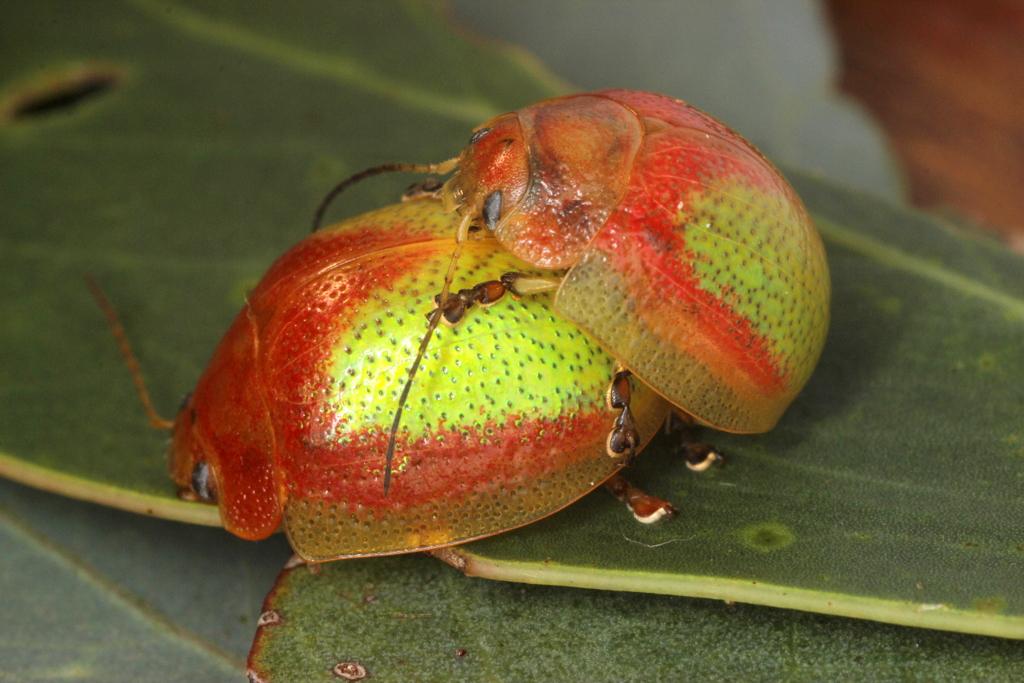
Paropsisterna pictipes

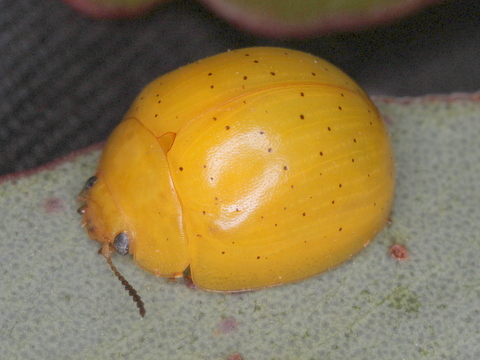
Paropsisterna remota

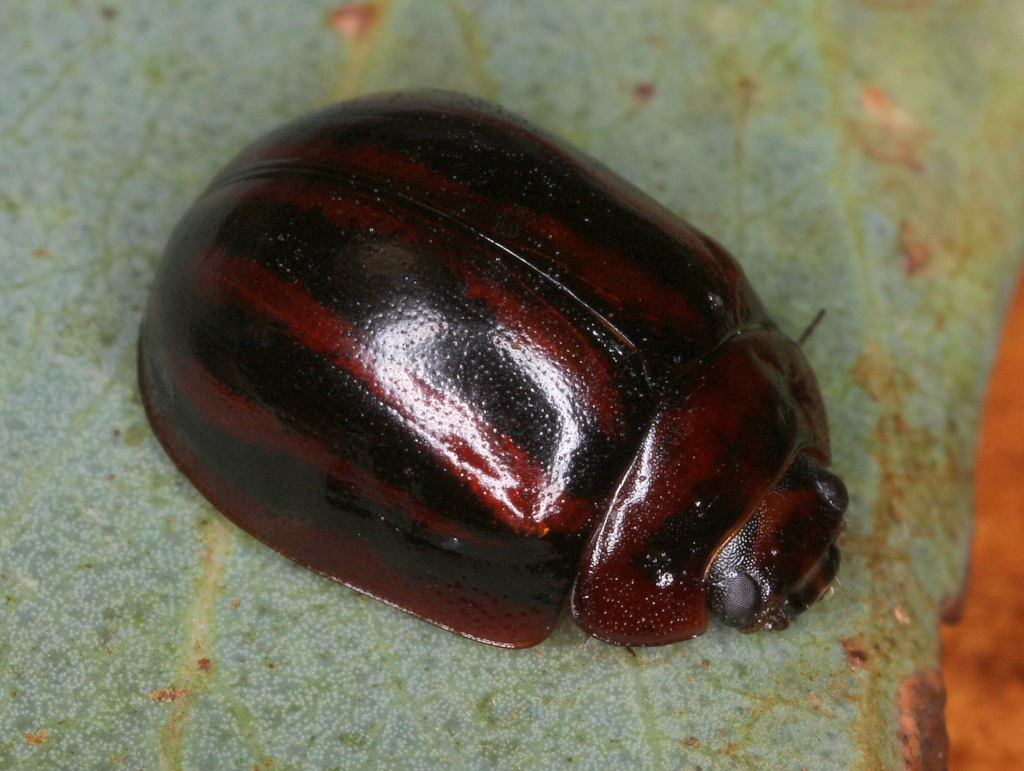
Paropsisterna stygia trivittata

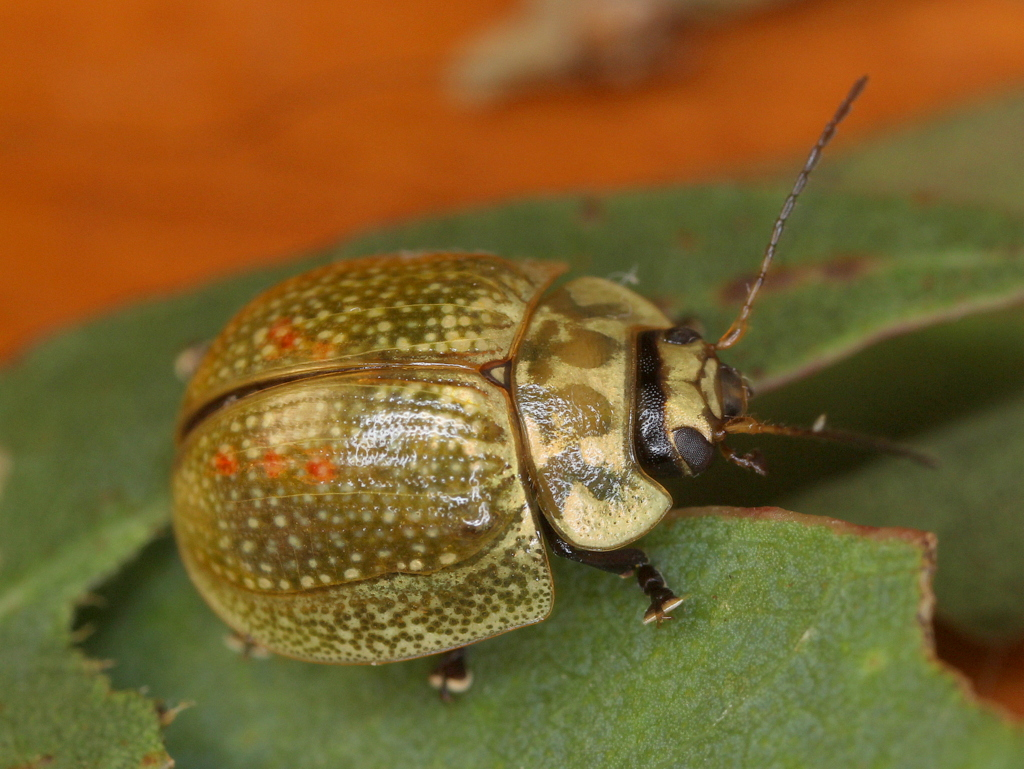
Paropsisterna variicollis
