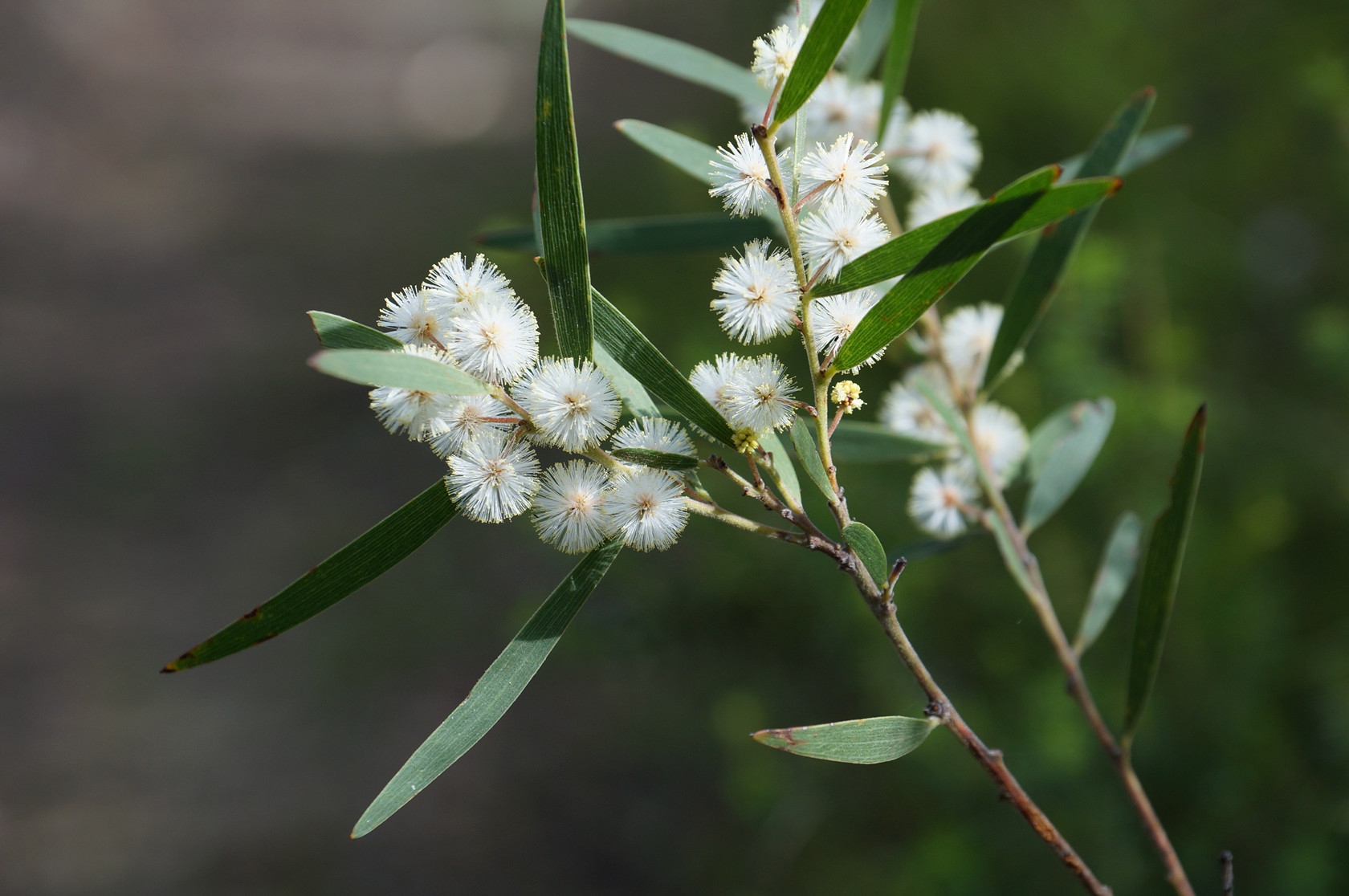
- In D'Aguilar National Park.

Scientific classification
- Kingdom: Plantae
- Clade: Tracheophytes
- Clade: Angiosperms
- Clade: Eudicots
- Clade: Rosids
- Order: Fabales
- Family: Fabaceae
- Subfamily: Caesalpinioideae
- Clade: Mimosoid clade
- Genus: Acacia
- Species: A. baeuerlenii

Binomial name
- Acacia baeuerlenii Maiden & R.T.Baker
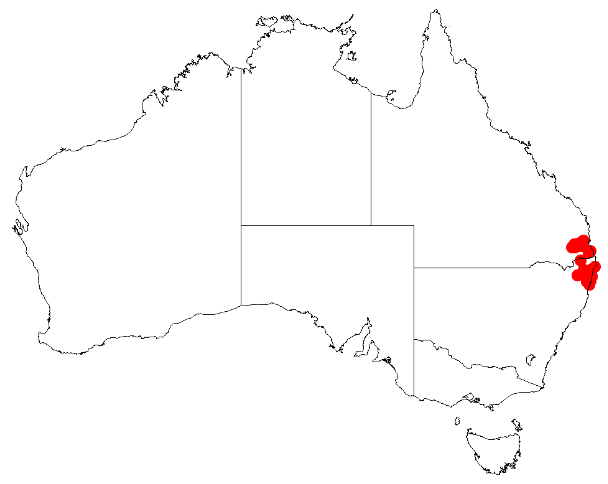
- Acacia baeuerlenii occurrence data from Australasian Virtual Herbarium

= Acacia baeuerlenii =

Species of legume

Acacia baeuerlenii is a species of flowering plant in the family Fabaceae and is endemic to a small area in eastern Australia. It is a slender shrub with mostly narrowly elliptic phyllodes, racemes of spherical heads of creamy-white flowers, and leathery pods.

== Description ==
Acacia baeuerlenii is a slender shrub that typically grows to a height of 1–4 m (3 ft 3 in – 13 ft 1 in) and has angled, ribbed and hairy branchlets. Its phyllodes are erect, narrowly elliptic, straight to slightly curved, 65–150 mm (2.6–5.9 in) long and 4.5–13 mm (0.18–0.51 in) wide, leathery and glabrous. The flowers are arranged in up to three spherical heads on a raceme 1–6 mm (0.039–0.236 in) long on a peduncle 7–16 mm (0.28–0.63 in) long. Each head is 7–9 mm (0.28–0.35 in) in diameter with 30 to 40 creamy-white flowers. Flowering occurs from June to August and the pods are narrowly oblong, leathery, up to 85 mm (3.3 in) long and 6–8 mm (0.24–0.31 in) wide, raised on opposite sides over alternate seeds. The seeds are broadly oblong-elliptic, dark brown, 5.0–5.5 mm (0.20–0.22 in) long with a thick, fleshy aril.

== Taxonomy ==
The species was first formally described in 1896 by the botanists Joseph Maiden and Richard Thomas Baker in the Proceedings of the Linnean Society of New South Wales from specimens collected at New Italy by William Baeuerlen. This species is similar to A. tessellata and A. venulosa.

== Distribution and habitat ==
This species of wattle is found from near Helidon is south-east Queensland and south to Maclean, Red Rock and the Gibraltar Range in northern New South Wales, where it grows on sandy soil in forest.

== See also ==
- List of Acacia species
