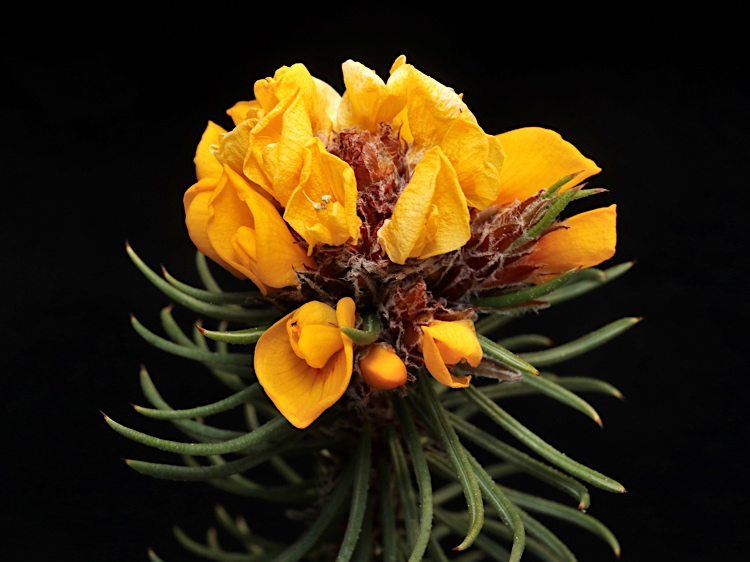
- In the ANBG

Conservation status
- Vulnerable (EPBC Act)

Scientific classification
- Kingdom: Plantae
- Clade: Tracheophytes
- Clade: Angiosperms
- Clade: Eudicots
- Clade: Rosids
- Order: Fabales
- Family: Fabaceae
- Subfamily: Faboideae
- Genus: Pultenaea
- Species: P. baeuerlenii

Binomial name
- Pultenaea baeuerlenii F.Muell.

= Pultenaea baeuerlenii =

Budawangs bush-pea

Species of flowering plant

Pultenaea baeuerlenii, commonly known as Budawangs bush-pea, is a species of flowering plant in the family Fabaceae and is endemic to a restricted area of New South Wales. It is a small, erect shrub with linear, cylindrical, grooved leaves, and dense groups of yellow and red flowers, sometimes with red markings.

== Description ==
Pultenaea baeuerlenii is an erect shrub that typically grows to a height of up to 1.5 m (4 ft 11 in). The leaves are linear and cylindrical, 10–15 mm (0.39–0.59 in) long and about 0.5 mm (0.020 in) wide with a groove along the upper surface, stipules about 6 mm (0.24 in) long at the base and a hooked tip. The flowers are densely crowded at the ends of the branchlets with bracts about 7 mm (0.28 in) long at the base. Each flower is about 10 mm (0.39 in) long and sessile with oblong to elliptic bracteoles about 6 mm (0.24 in) long attached to the base of the sepals that are about 7 mm (0.28 in) long. The standard petal is yellow to orange, sometimes with reddish markings and 9.7–11 mm (0.38–0.43 in) long, the wings are yellow to orange and the keel is yellow. Flowering occurs in spring and autumn and the fruit is a flattened pod about 7 mm (0.28 in) long.

== Taxonomy and naming ==
Pultenaea baeuerlenii was first formally described in 1887 by Ferdinand von Mueller in the Proceedings of the Linnean Society of New South Wales. The specific epithet (baeuerlenii) honours William Baeuerlen who collected the type specimens on Mount Currockbilly "at an elevation of 4,000 ft (1,200 m)" in the Budawang Range.

== Distribution and habitat ==
Budawangs bush-pea grows in swamp heath on sandstone and is only known from four populations in the Budawang Range.

== Conservation status ==
This pultenaea is classified as "vulnerable" under the Australian Government Environment Protection and Biodiversity Conservation Act 1999 and the New South Wales Government Biodiversity Conservation Act 2016. The main threats to the species include inappropriate fire regimes, understorey clearing and road widening and maintenance.
