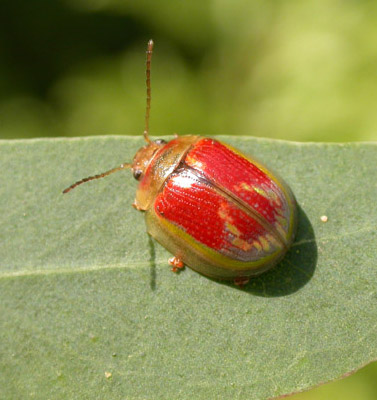

Scientific classification
- Kingdom: Animalia
- Phylum: Arthropoda
- Class: Insecta
- Order: Coleoptera
- Suborder: Polyphaga
- Infraorder: Cucujiformia
- Family: Chrysomelidae
- Genus: Paropsisterna
- Species: P. selmani

Binomial name
- Paropsisterna selmani Reid & de Little, 2013

= Paropsisterna selmani =

Species of beetle

Paropsisterna selmani, the Tasmanian eucalyptus beetle, is a species of leaf beetle native to Tasmania which has been inadvertently introduced to the Republic of Ireland and United Kingdom. It is the first eucalyptus-feeding chrysomelid known to have become established in Europe.

== Description ==
Paropsisterna selmani first came to scientific attention in 2007 when beetles were found attacking cultivated Eucalyptus species in County Kerry, Ireland, and in 2012 a single adult was photographed in a garden in London. It was realised that these were identical to a pest species on Eucalyptus nitens plantations in Tasmania, which had been tentatively identified as Paropsisterna gloriosa by entomologist Brian Selman of University of Newcastle upon Tyne. Further studies showed it was in fact a new species, which was named in honour of Selman (who died in 2009). Paropsisterna is a large genus of over 120 species which are distinguished by colour patterns, which are normally lost in preserved specimens.

When first scientifically described, Paropsisterna selmani was already a pest in both Tasmania and Ireland, causing significant defoliation, and so also in Surrey in 2015. Eucalyptus species are economically important worldwide as a fast-growing source of timber, pulpwood and other products.

Paropsisterna selmani is an elliptical beetle up to 9mm long, orange to brown, generally with a yellowish ring of marks towards the tipe of the elytra. Larvae are typical chrysomelid grubs, generally orange-brown. It feeds exclusively on Eucalyptus species, preferentially on glaucous foliaged eucalypt species of the subgenus Symphyomyrtus, and particularly the plantation tree E. nitens.
