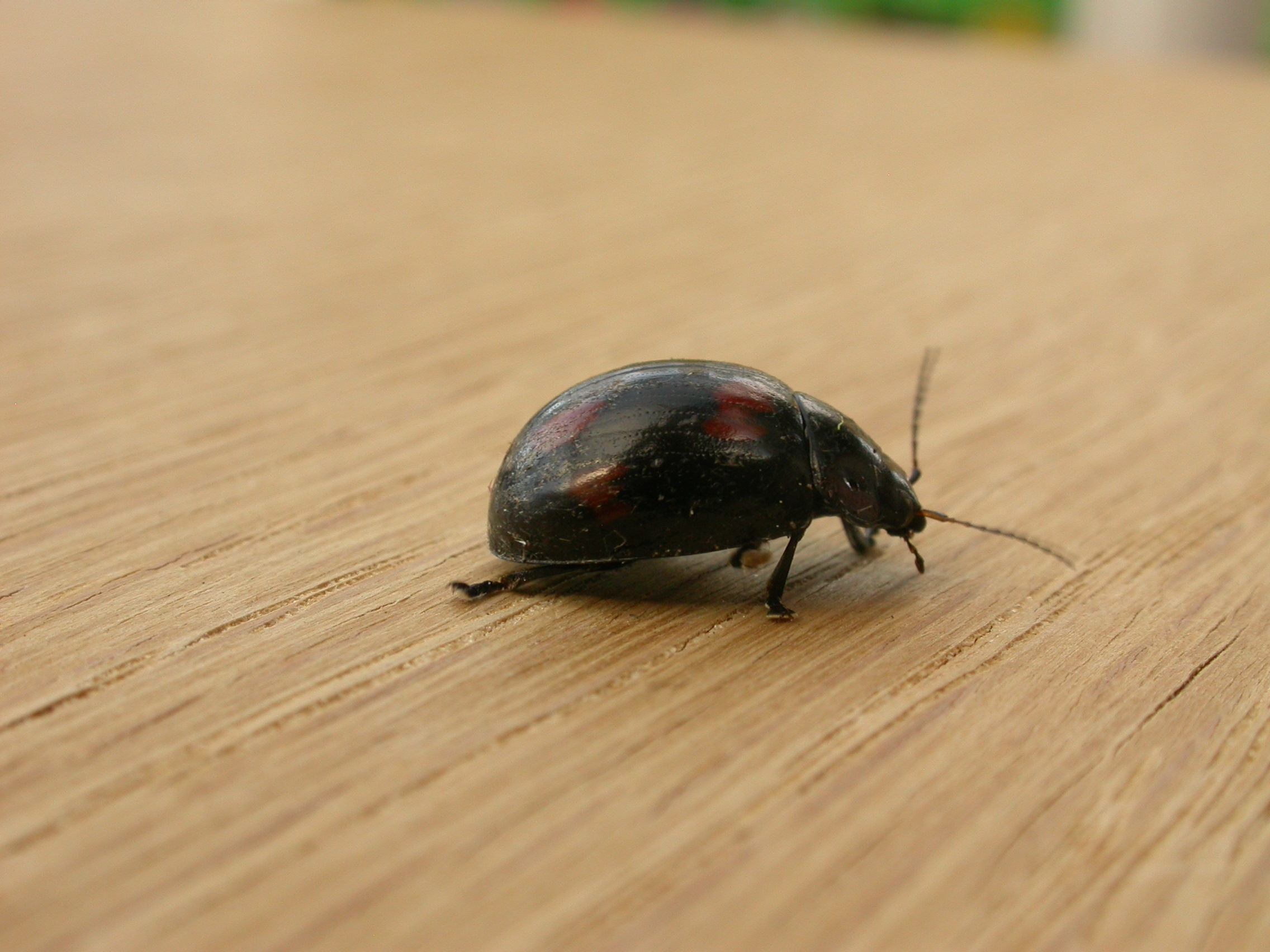

Scientific classification
- Domain: Eukaryota
- Kingdom: Animalia
- Phylum: Arthropoda
- Class: Insecta
- Order: Coleoptera
- Suborder: Polyphaga
- Infraorder: Cucujiformia
- Family: Chrysomelidae
- Genus: Paropsisterna
- Species: P. beata

Binomial name
- Paropsisterna beata (Newman, 1842)

= Paropsisterna beata =

Species of beetle

Paropsisterna beata, commonly known as the blessed leaf beetle, is a species of leaf beetle. It occurs in all states of Australia except Tasmania.

== Description ==
Paropsisterna beata is a mostly black beetle except for an orange head, orange margins on the pronotum, a narrow orange "skirt" around the elytra, and each elytron having three orange blotches. Sometimes, two of the blotches on each elytron are joined, especially in the north of the species' range. There are extremely fine puncturations and striae.

There is a subspecies, P. beata rubrosignata, in which the elytral blotches are more yellowish and the marginal colouring is thicker and more reddish.

Some other species in the genus resemble P. beata but can be distinguished by certain features: P. sexpustulata lacks the colored lateral skirt and P. octosignata has an entirely black pronotum.

== Life cycle and diet ==
As a beetle, P. beata undergoes complete metamorphosis with the four life stages of egg, larva, pupa and adult.

Like others of its genus, larvae and adults of P. beata feed on foliage of Eucalyptus. Host plants mentioned in the literature are Eucalyptus grandis and E. nitens.

Pupation takes place in leaf litter or within the soil. During winter, adults go into diapause under the loose bark of trees, in crevices in wood or in leaf litter underneath trees.

== Introduction to New Zealand ==
A large population of P. beata was detected on Eucalyptus nitens at Whitemans Valley, New Zealand in 2012. In response, insecticides were applied both aerially and on the ground, and overwintering habitat was removed by stripping loose bark from host trees. The beetle has not been detected again, suggesting it has been successfully eradicated.
