= Tasmanian oak =

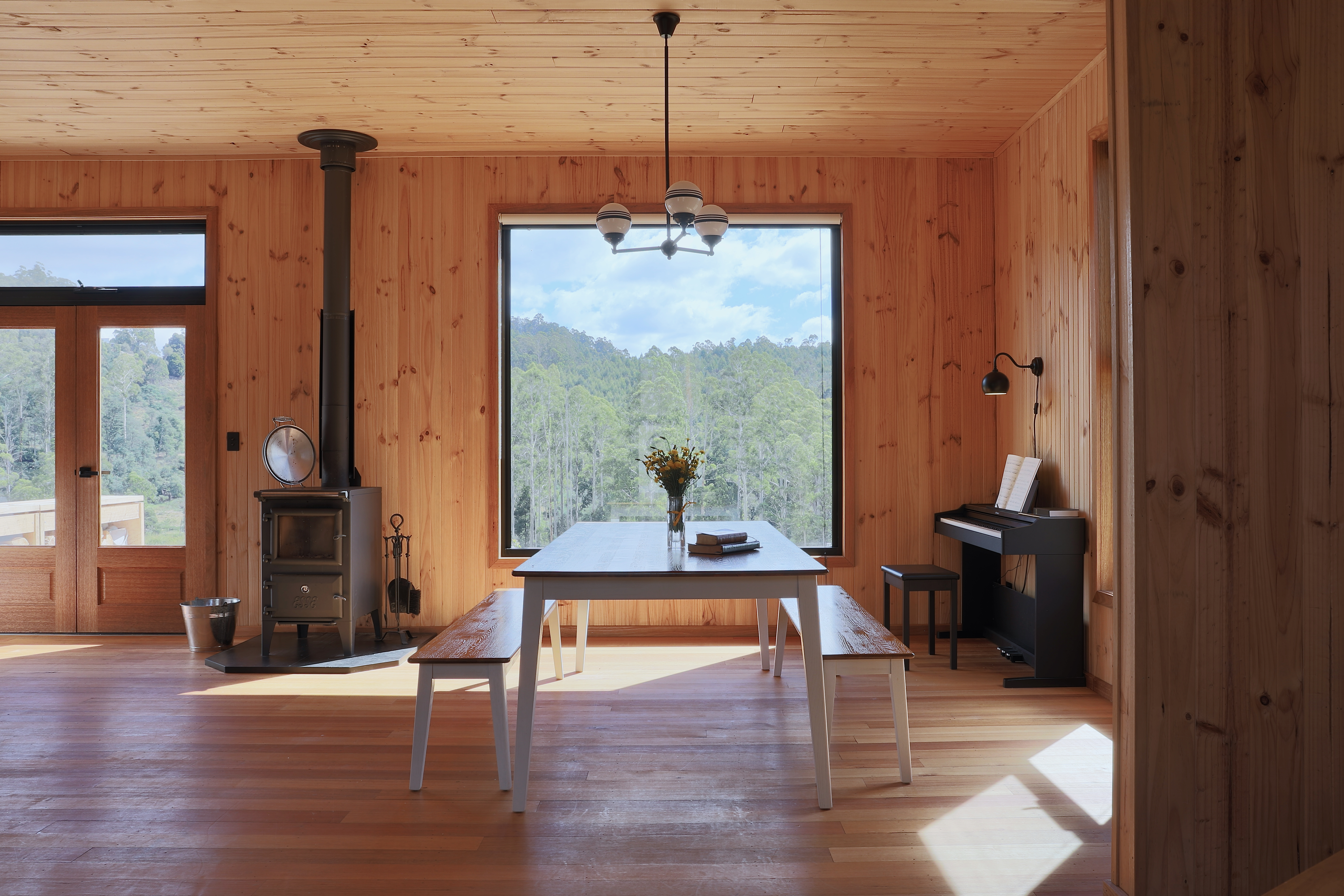
Natural Tasmanian Oak flooring, open pore, untreated, sealed with Danish oil.

Tasmanian oak is a native Australian hardwood produced by any of three trees, Eucalyptus regnans, Eucalyptus obliqua or Eucalyptus delegatensis, when it is sourced from the Australian state of Tasmania. Despite the common name "oak", none of the species are in the genus Quercus or the oak family Fagaceae.

The hardwood timber is light-coloured, ranging from straw to light reddish brown. It is used in construction, including panelling and flooring, for furniture, and also for reconstituted board and high quality paper.

When sourced from Victoria, the wood of Eucalyptus regnans and Eucalyptus delegatensis is called Victorian ash.

The species are also widely known by their common names. Eucalyptus obliqua is known as stringybark or messmate, Eucalyptus regnans is known as mountain ash, and the closely related Eucalyptus delegatensis is known as alpine ash or woollybutt.
