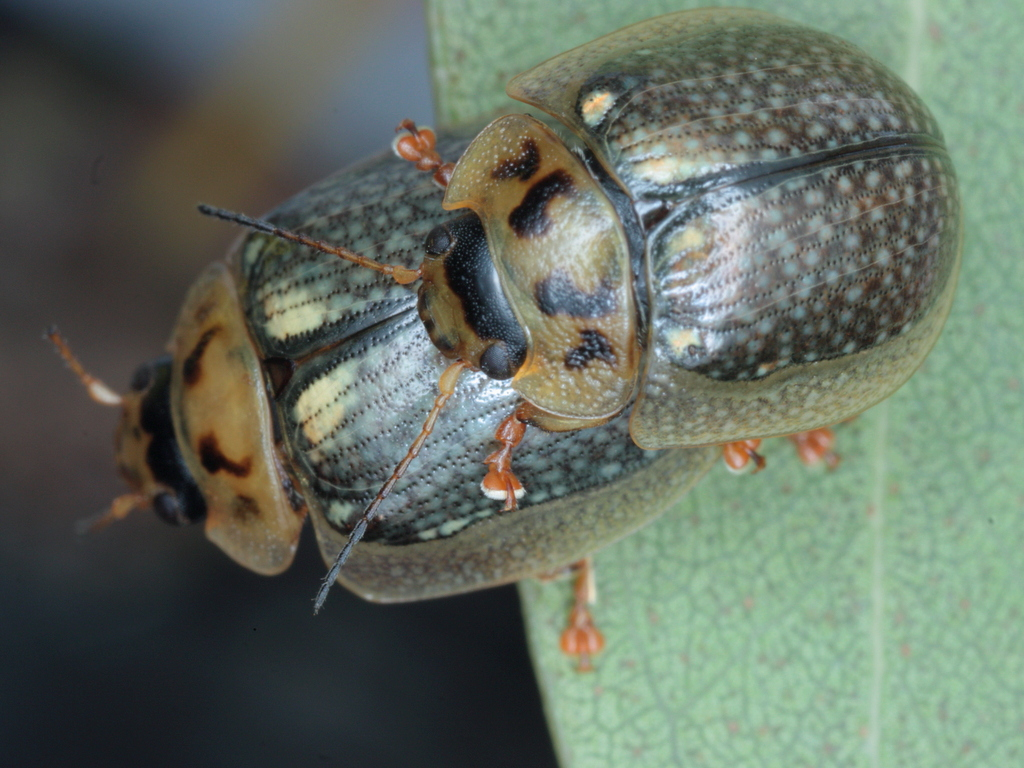

Scientific classification
- Kingdom: Animalia
- Phylum: Arthropoda
- Class: Insecta
- Order: Coleoptera
- Suborder: Polyphaga
- Infraorder: Cucujiformia
- Family: Chrysomelidae
- Genus: Paropsisterna
- Species: P. agricola

Binomial name
- Paropsisterna agricola (Chapuis, 1877)

= Paropsisterna agricola =

Species of beetle

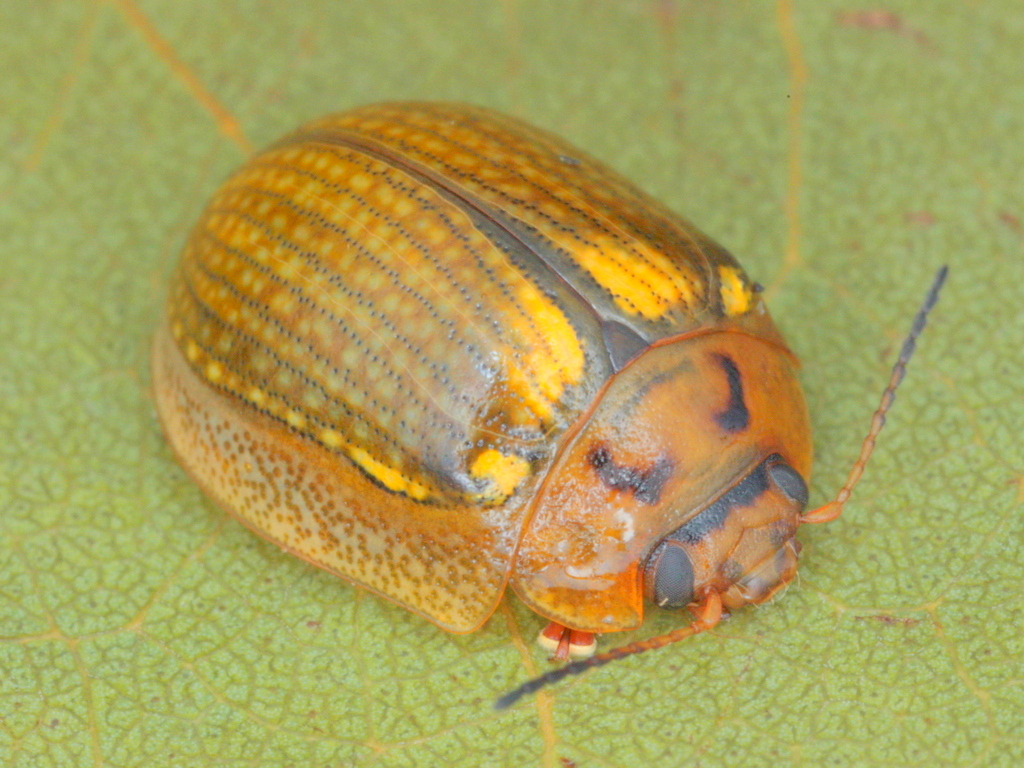
Paropsisterna agricola

Paropsisterna agricola, or southern eucalyptus leaf beetle, is a small hemispherical leaf beetle. They can vary from golden to grey. They have some black markings on the pronotum. The epipleura (skirt) is sometimes red.

This species has the ability to increase population very rapidly and can become a commercial pest to the timber industry attacking plantation forests.
