= Victorian ash =

Victorian ash can refer to the wood of either of the trees Eucalyptus regnans or Eucalyptus delegatensis, when it is sourced from the Australian state of Victoria. The same wood sourced from Tasmania is called Tasmanian oak. It is the most common (wood-based) building material used in Australia. Most furniture in Australia (up to 70%) is made of Victorian Ash.
