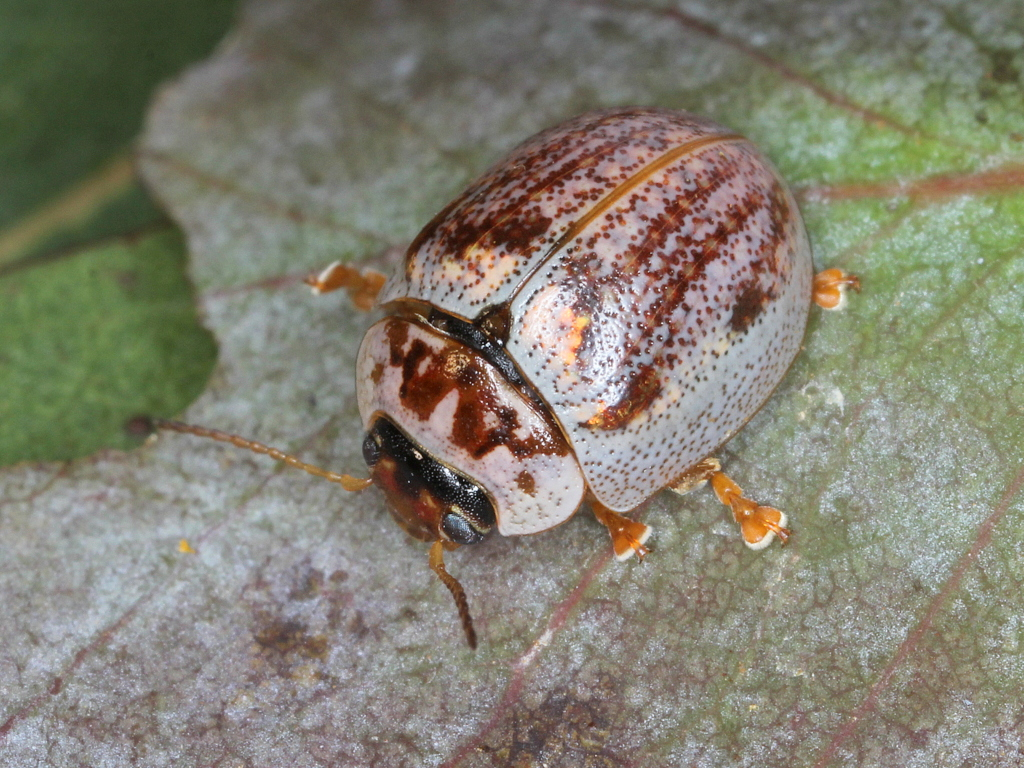

Scientific classification
- Domain: Eukaryota
- Kingdom: Animalia
- Phylum: Arthropoda
- Class: Insecta
- Order: Coleoptera
- Suborder: Polyphaga
- Infraorder: Cucujiformia
- Family: Chrysomelidae
- Genus: Paropsisterna
- Species: P. m-fuscum

Binomial name
- Paropsisterna m-fuscum (Boheman, 1859)

= Paropsisterna m-fuscum =

Species of beetle

Paropsisterna m-fuscum is a beetle commonly called a leaf beetle in the subfamily Chrysomelinae, and native to Australia. This insect can become very prolific and is a serious pest species in the forestry industry. This beetle is an invasive species and a problem on Blue Gum in California, USA. The beetles are pale, with variable brown markings on the elytra and pronotum and sometimes with bright flaring at the base of the elytra. The larvae are pale green like the leaves they eat.
