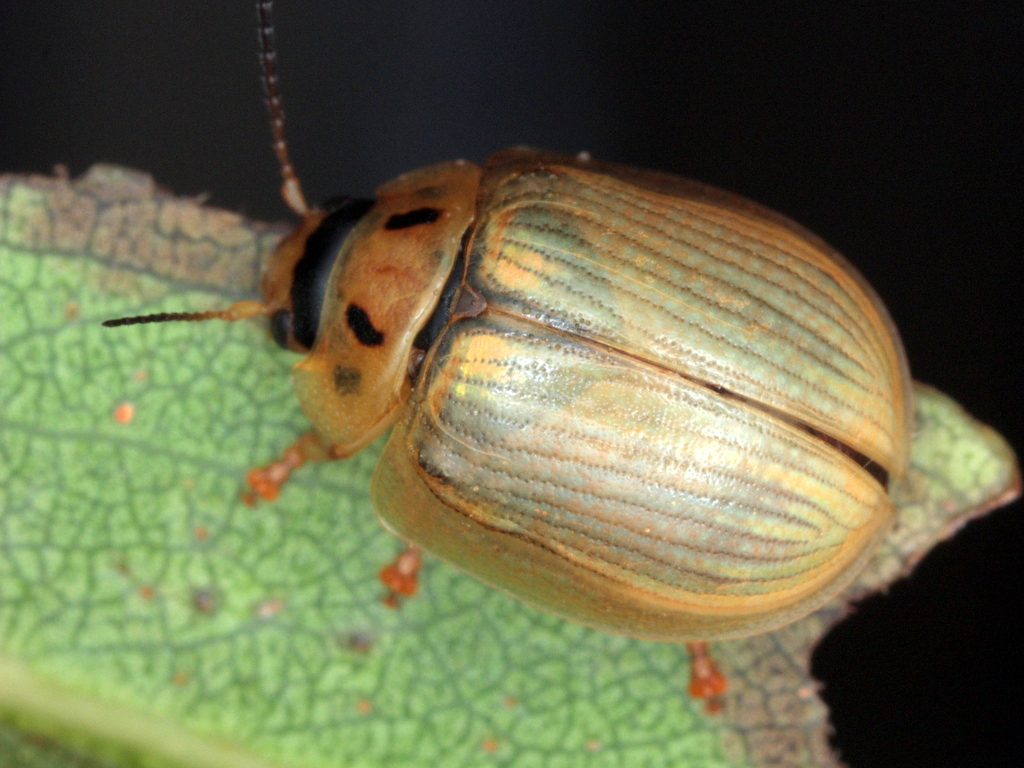

Scientific classification
- Kingdom: Animalia
- Phylum: Arthropoda
- Class: Insecta
- Order: Coleoptera
- Suborder: Polyphaga
- Infraorder: Cucujiformia
- Family: Chrysomelidae
- Genus: Paropsisterna
- Species: P. bimaculata

Binomial name
- Paropsisterna bimaculata (Olivier, 1807)

Synonyms
- Chrysophtharta bimaculata Olivier, 1807

= Paropsisterna bimaculata =

Species of beetle

Paropsisterna bimaculata is a beetle commonly called a leaf beetle in the subfamily Chrysomelinae. This insect is common in Tasmania and can be a pest in the forestry industry. Paropsisterna bimaculata will develop a red colour just before their winter hibernation. When they emerge the red slowly disappears into a pale green colouring with faint gold tessellation. This takes about a month with the males generally slightly advanced. Recently this beetle has been noticed in Victoria.
