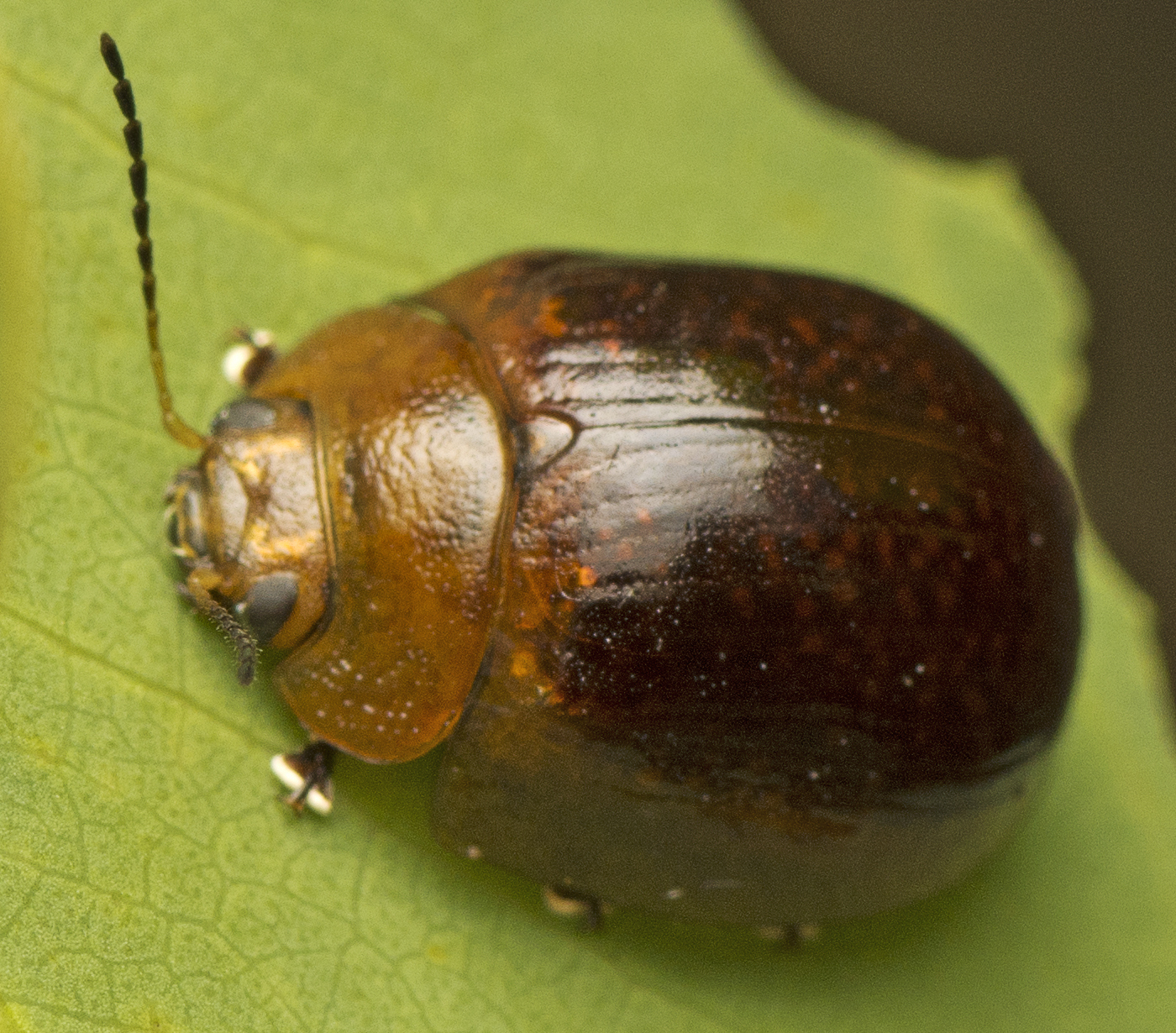

Scientific classification
- Kingdom: Animalia
- Phylum: Arthropoda
- Clade: Pancrustacea
- Class: Insecta
- Order: Coleoptera
- Suborder: Polyphaga
- Infraorder: Cucujiformia
- Family: Chrysomelidae
- Genus: Paropsisterna
- Species: P. cloelia

Binomial name
- Paropsisterna cloelia (Stål, 1860)

Synonyms
- Chrysophtharta cloelia Stål, 1860

= Paropsisterna cloelia =

Species of beetle

Paropsisterna cloelia, known as the eucalyptus leaf beetle, is a species of leaf beetle native to Australia.

== Diet ==
This beetle feeds on both juvenile and adult leaves of plants within the genus Eucalyptus.

== Description ==
Adults are less than 10mm long and dome-shaped. They are mostly orange but can be dark brown or black with an orange edge and head. Larvae are 2–12mm long and yellow-green to olive-green with dark heads; mature larvae have thin black stripes on the abdomen.
