= Acacia tessellata =

Scientific classification
- Kingdom: Plantae
- Clade: Tracheophytes
- Clade: Angiosperms
- Clade: Eudicots
- Clade: Rosids
- Order: Fabales
- Family: Fabaceae
- Subfamily: Caesalpinioideae
- Clade: Mimosoid clade
- Genus: Acacia
- Species: A. tessellata

Binomial name
- Acacia tessellata Tindale & Kodela
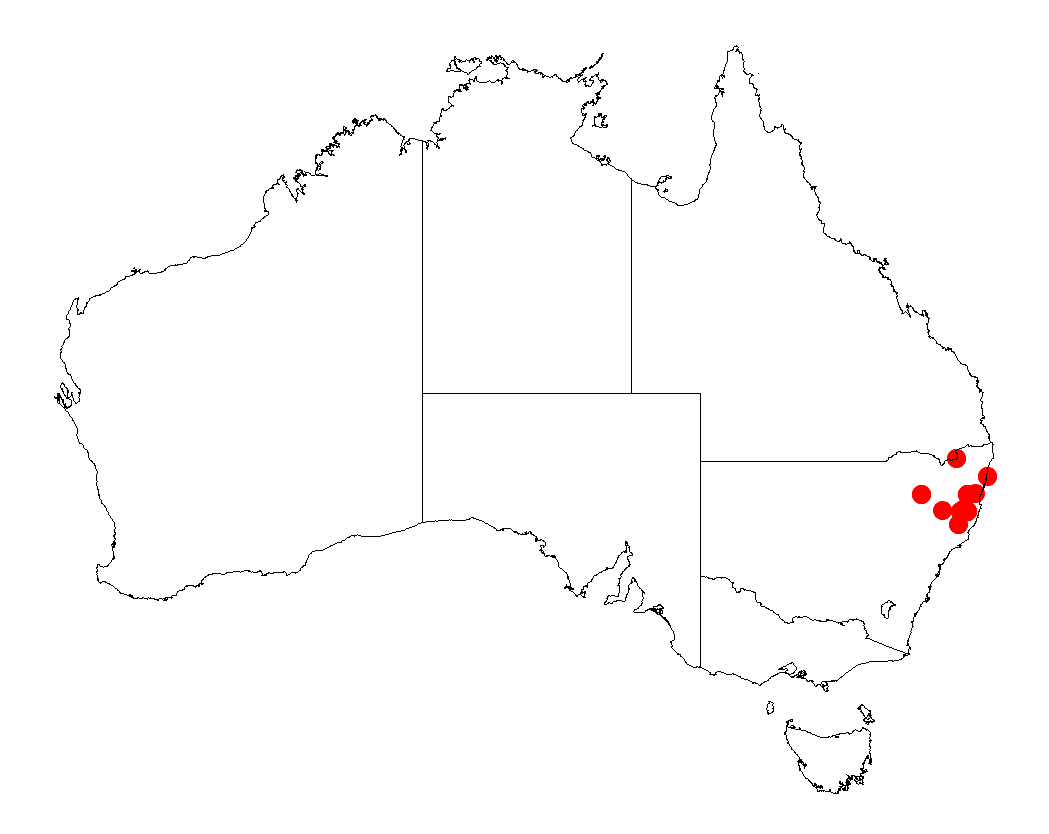
- Occurrence data from AVH

Species of legume

Acacia tessellata is a shrub or tree of the genus Acacia and the subgenus Plurinerves that is endemic to a small area of eastern Australia.

== Description ==
The tall shrub or small tree typically grows to a height of 2.5 to 15 m (8 ft 2 in to 49 ft 3 in) and has mottled grey to light brown coloured bark that is hard and tessellated with angled and prominently ridged glabrous branchlets. Like most species of Acacia it has phyllodes rather than true leaves. The glabrous and evergreen phyllodes have a linear to narrowly elliptic shape and are more or less straight with a length of 8 to 18 cm (3.1 to 7.1 in) and a width of 3 to 9 mm (0.12 to 0.35 in) with a prominent midvein and two to ten less prominent longitudinal veins. It blooms between January and February producing inflorescences that occur singly or in groups of up to three in the axils with spherical flower-heads with a diameter of 7 to 10 mm (0.28 to 0.39 in) containing 25 to 36 very pale yellow coloured flowers. Following flowering leathery and glabrous seed pods form that are flat and straight a little raised over each of the seeds and are 5 to 15 cm (2.0 to 5.9 in) in length and 4 to 6 mm (0.16 to 0.24 in) wide.

== Taxonomy ==
The species was first formally described by the botanists Mary Tindale and Peter Kodela in 1991 as a part of the work Acacia tesellata, A. cangaiensis and A. dangarensis (Fabaceae, Mimosoideae), three new species from Northern New South Wales, Australia as published in the journal Australian Systematic Botany. It was reclassified as Racosperma tessellatum in 2003 by Leslie Pedley then transferred back to genus Acacia in 2006.

== Description ==
It is found in the north east of New South Wales from the North Coast to the edge for the Northern Tablelands where it is commonly situated on exposed sites on escarpment ridges at higher altitudes as a part of wet sclerophyll forest or scrubland and along the margins of cool-temperate rainforests with a range that extends from around Werrikimbe National Park in the south where it is quite common on Mount Boss and Mount Banda Banda to Washpool National Park in the north.

== See also ==
- List of Acacia species
