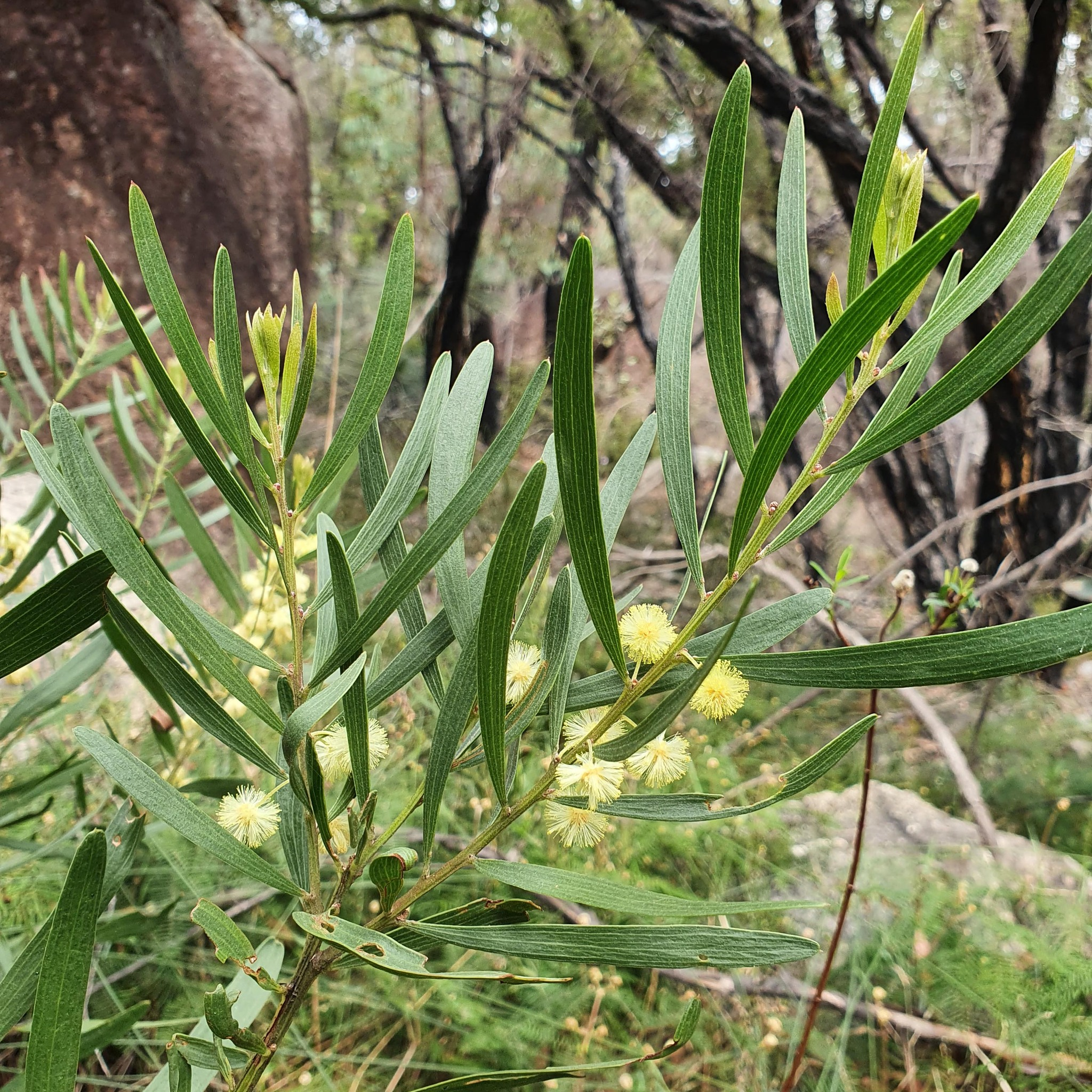
- In the Gibraltar Range National Park

Scientific classification
- Kingdom: Plantae
- Clade: Embryophytes
- Clade: Tracheophytes
- Clade: Spermatophytes
- Clade: Angiosperms
- Clade: Eudicots
- Clade: Rosids
- Order: Fabales
- Family: Fabaceae
- Subfamily: Caesalpinioideae
- Clade: Mimosoid clade
- Genus: Acacia
- Species: A. venulosa

Binomial name
- Acacia venulosa Benth.
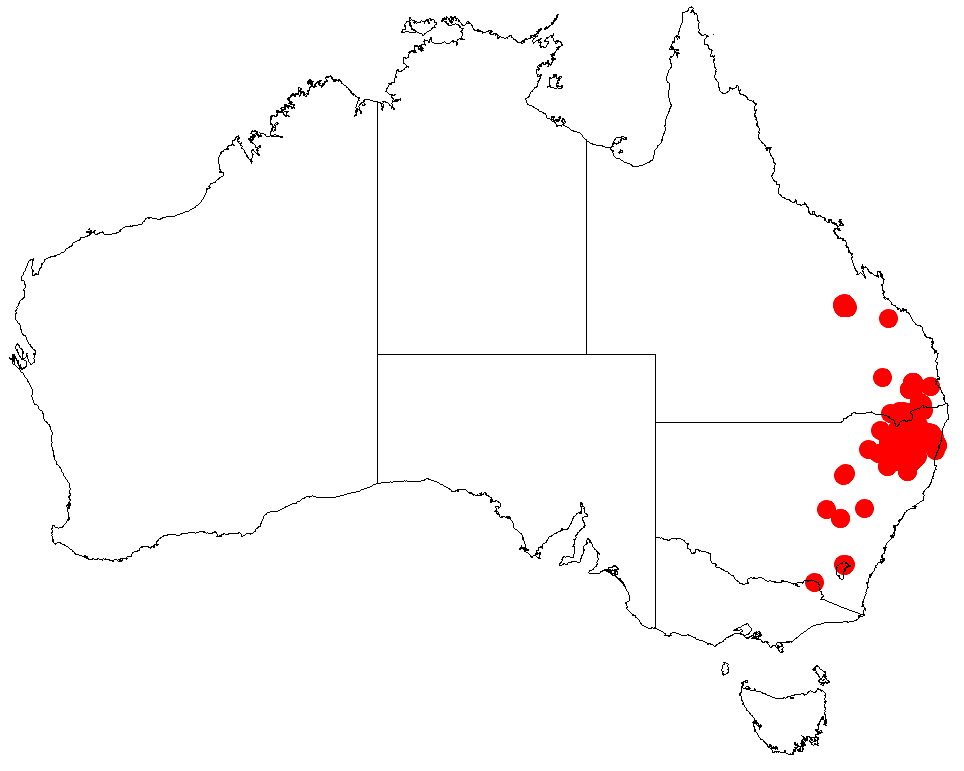
- Occurrence data from AVH

= Acacia venulosa =

Veiny wattle

Species of legume

Acacia venulosa, commonly known as veiny wattle or veined wattle, is a shrub of the genus Acacia and the subgenus Plurinerves that is endemic to an area of eastern Australia.

== Description ==
The shrub typically grows to a height of 0.5 to 3 m (1 ft 8 in to 9 ft 10 in) with angular-ribbed branchlets that are covered in red-brown to black resin-hairs. Like most species of Acacia it has phyllodes rather than true leaves. The ascending, thinly leathery and glabrous to slightly hairy phyllodes have a narrowly elliptic shape and are straight to incurved with a length of 5 to 9 cm (2.0 to 3.5 in) and a width of 4 to 15 mm (0.16 to 0.59 in). The coarsely pungent phyllodes have three main nerves with many longitudinally minor nerves in between. It blooms between June and November.

== Taxonomy ==
The species was first formally described by the botanist George Bentham in 1842 as a part of the work Notes on Mimoseae, with a synopsis of species as published in the London Journal of Botany. It was reclassified by Leslie Pedley in 1987 as Racosperma venulosum then transferred back to genus Acacia in 2006. The only other synonym is Acacia lanigera var. venulosa.

== Distribution ==
It is native to south eastern Queensland and north eastern New South Wales. In New South Wales it is found to the north of Corindi Beach and the Northern Tablelands from around Armidale and the north western slopes around Howell where it is found growing in stony and sandy soils over and around areas of granite and sandstone as a part of open Eucalyptus forests and woodlands and heathsland communities.

== Cultivation ==
The seeds of the plant are available commercially and can be used for areas requiring revegetation or as an ornamental although seeds can require pretreatment.

== See also ==
- List of Acacia species
