= William Baeuerlen =

German-born Australian botanist and explorer

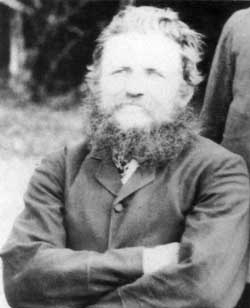
- Born: 27 October 1840; Niedernhall, Germany
- Died: 28 October 1917 (aged 77); Sydney, Australia
- Known for: Botanical collector & explorer
- Scientific career
- Fields: botany

William Baeuerlen (1840 – 1917) was a German botanical collector and explorer. He was born in Niedernhall as Leonhard Carl Wilhelm Bäuerlen. He became Ferdinand von Mueller's botanical collector in Australia from the 1880s, and later the collector for Joseph Maiden in Sydney.

Baeuerlen travelled extensively in eastern Australia, particularly in New South Wales, collecting many thousands of specimens. There are 4,404 records currently attributed to Baeuerlen. He was part of the Bonito Exploration of 1885 to New Guinea. In 1891, he published a book "Wildlfowers of New South Wales", co-authored by Gertrude Lovegrove. His name is honoured as specific epithets in several species. Such as Correa baeuerlenii, Eucalyptus baeuerlenii and Acacia baeuerlenii.

Specimens collected by Baeuerlen are cared for at the National Herbarium of Victoria (MEL), Royal Botanic Gardens Victoria.
