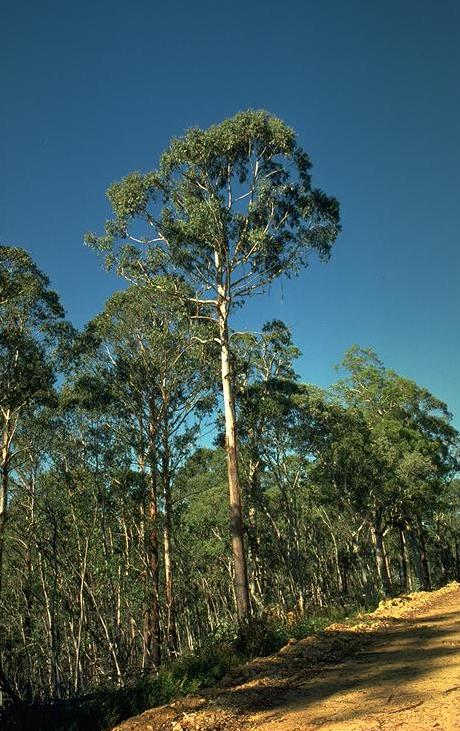
- Eucalyptus delegatensis growing between Corryong and Omeo

Conservation status
- Least Concern (IUCN 3.1)

Scientific classification
- Kingdom: Plantae
- Clade: Embryophytes
- Clade: Tracheophytes
- Clade: Spermatophytes
- Clade: Angiosperms
- Clade: Eudicots
- Clade: Rosids
- Order: Myrtales
- Family: Myrtaceae
- Genus: Eucalyptus
- Species: E. delegatensis

Binomial name
- Eucalyptus delegatensis R.T.Baker

= Eucalyptus delegatensis =

Alpine ash

Species of eucalyptus

Eucalyptus delegatensis, commonly known as alpine ash, gum-topped stringybark, white-top and in Victoria as woollybutt, is a species of tree that is endemic to southeastern Australia. It has a straight trunk with rough, fibrous to stringy bark on the lower half of the trunk, smooth white bark above, lance-shaped to curved adult leaves, flower buds in groups of between seven and fifteen, white flowers and barrel-shaped or hemispherical fruit.

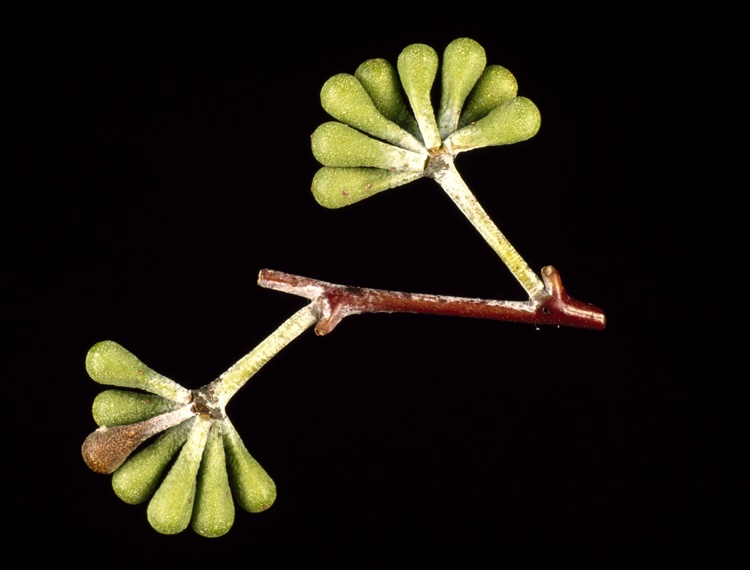
Flower buds

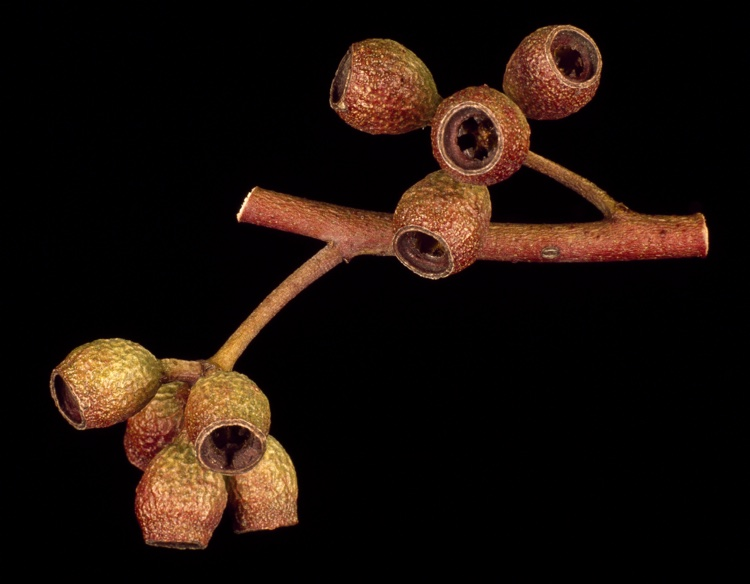
Fruit

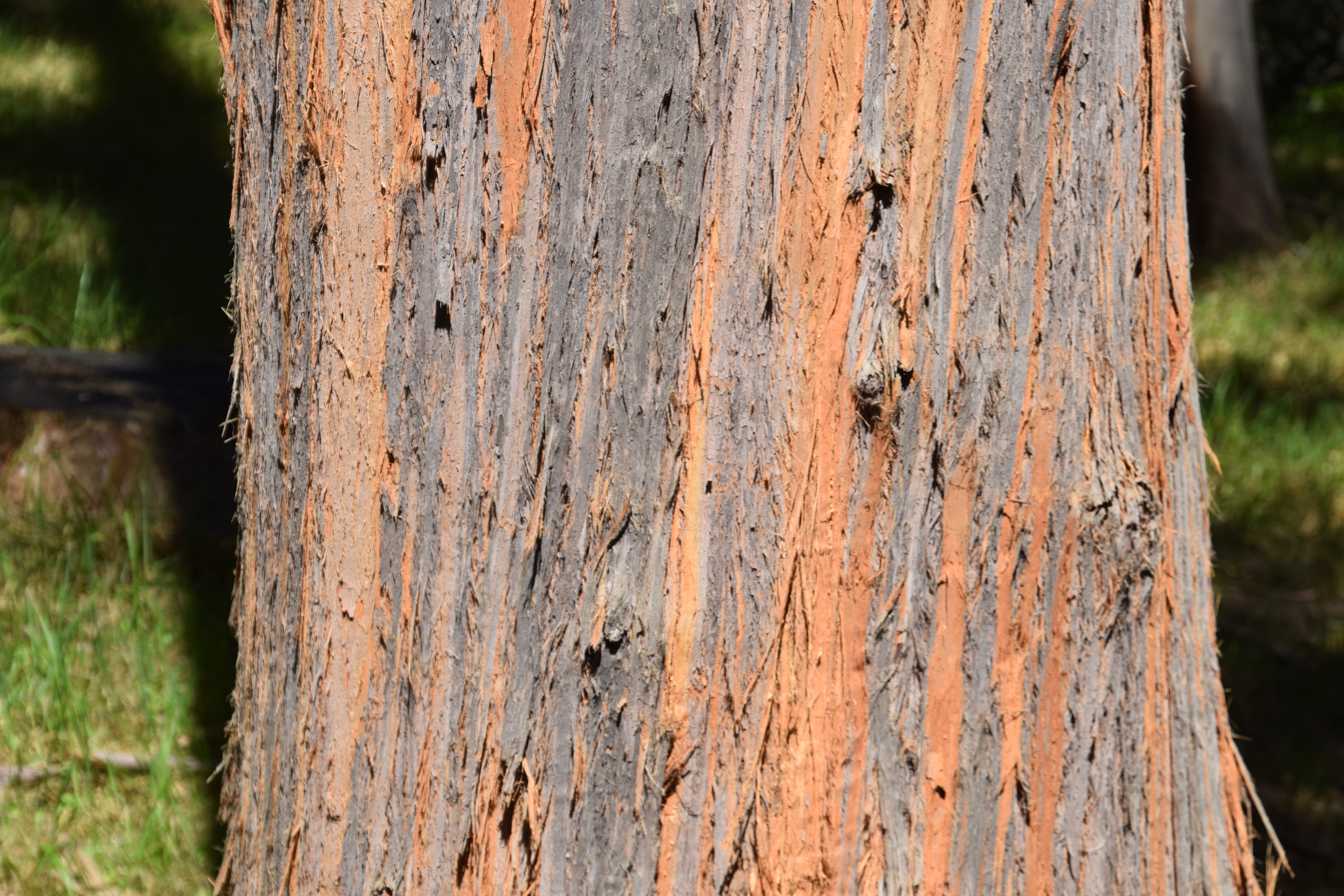
Bark

== Description ==
Eucalyptus delegatensis is a tree that typically grows to a height of 40–50 m (130–160 ft), sometimes to 90 m (300 ft), and forms a lignotuber. The bark is rough, grey to black, fibrous or stringy on the lower half of the trunk, smooth white to greyish above. Young plants and coppice regrowth have broadly lance-shaped to egg-shaped leaves 70–200 mm (2.8–7.9 in) long and 27–82 mm (1.1–3.2 in) wide. Adult leaves are lance-shaped to curved, the same glossy green to bluish green on both sides, 75–230 mm (3.0–9.1 in) long and 13–55 mm (0.51–2.17 in) wide on a petiole 10–45 mm (0.39–1.77 in) long. The flower buds are arranged in groups of between seven and fifteen in leaf axils on an unbranched peduncle 8–20 mm (0.31–0.79 in) long, the individual buds on a pedicel 3–5 mm (0.12–0.20 in) long. Mature buds are oval to club-shaped, green to yellow or red, 4–5 mm (0.16–0.20 in) long and wide with a conical or rounded operculum with a small point on the tip. Flowering occurs between December and March and the flowers are white. The fruit is a woody barrel-shaped to hemispherical capsule 6–11 mm (0.24–0.43 in) long and wide with the valves near rim level or enclosed in the fruit.

== Taxonomy and naming ==
Eucalyptus delegatensis was first formally described in 1900 by Richard Thomas Baker from a specimen collected by William Baeuerlen, (previously known as Wilhelm Bäuerlen) on "Delegate Mountain". The description was published in Proceedings of the Linnean Society of New South Wales. The specific epithet (delegatensis) refers to the type location.

In 1985 Douglas John Boland described two subspecies and the names have been accepted by the Australian Plant Census:

- Eucalyptus delegatensis R.T.Baker subsp. delegatensis that has broadly lance-shaped juvenile leaves and is found in New South Wales and Victoria;
- Eucalyptus delegatensis subsp. tasmaniensis Boland that has more or less round juvenile leaves with a short "drip-tip" and only grows in Tasmania.

== Distribution and habitat ==
Alpine ash is widespread and often dominant in grassy or wet subalpine forest, in deep fertile soil, often on slopes, and commonly forms pure stands. In New South Wales and the Australian Capital Territory it is found south from the Brindabella Range and in Victoria it occurs at altitudes between 900 and 1,500 m (3,000 and 4,900 ft) east of Mount Macedon. Subspecies tasmaniensis is endemic to Tasmania.

== See also ==
- List of Eucalyptus species
