= Styx River (Tasmania) =

River in Tasmania, Australia

Styx
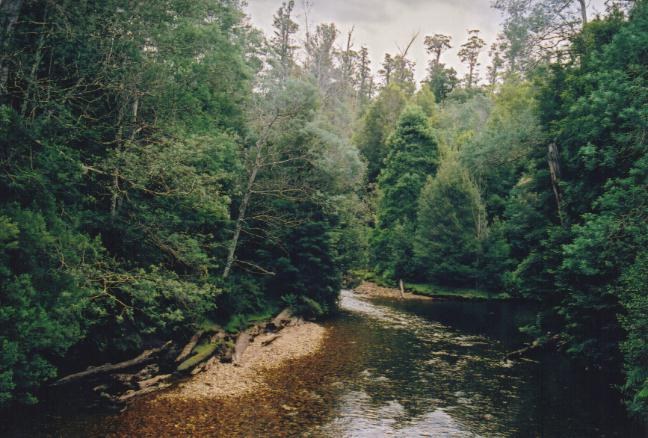
- Logged trees in the Styx Valley, as seen from Rumbly Bridge over the Styx River.

- Location of the mouth in Tasmania

Location
- Country: Australia
- State: Tasmania

Physical characteristics
- Source: Mount Mueller
  - coordinates: 42°46′12″S 146°27′00″E
  - elevation: 1,110 m (3,640 ft)
- Mouth: Confluence with River Derwent
  - location: Macquarie Plains
  - coordinates: 42°43′23″S 146°54′17″E
  - elevation: 24 m (79 ft)
- Length: 59 km (37 mi)

Basin features
- River system: River Derwent
- Tributaries
  - right: Charon Rivulet, Cliff Creek, South Styx River, Big Creek (Tasmania)

The Styx River is a perennial river in the centre of southern Tasmania, Australia. The upper reaches of the Styx River are in the Tasmanian Wilderness, south west of Maydena. The river is a popular destination for river-rafting and canoeing.

== Location and features ==
The Styx River rises below Mount Mueller at an elevation of 1,110 metres (3,640 ft) above sea level and flows generally east by north, joined by five minor tributaries, before reaching its confluence with the River Derwent near Macquarie Plains, west of New Norfolk. The river descends 1,090 metres (3,580 ft) over its 59-kilometre (37 mi) course.

The Styx Valley contains old growth forests including the tallest hardwood trees on earth, Eucalyptus regnans. The Wilderness Society and Senator Bob Brown have campaigned to save the forest from harvesting for sawn timber and woodchips. Some trees are so large they have become tourist attractions and named, including the Christmas Tree and Chapel Tree.

The first settlers in the Styx Valley arrived in 1812. The name has no classical associations; early colonial visitors noted the many fallen trees, stripped of bark and bleached by years of exposure, laying across the river and along the banks. The name came from this feature, literally, the 'river of sticks' - Sticks River. The name was changed later by a government official.

== See also ==
- List of rivers of Australia § Tasmania
