= Styx Valley =

Valley on the island of Tasmania, Australia

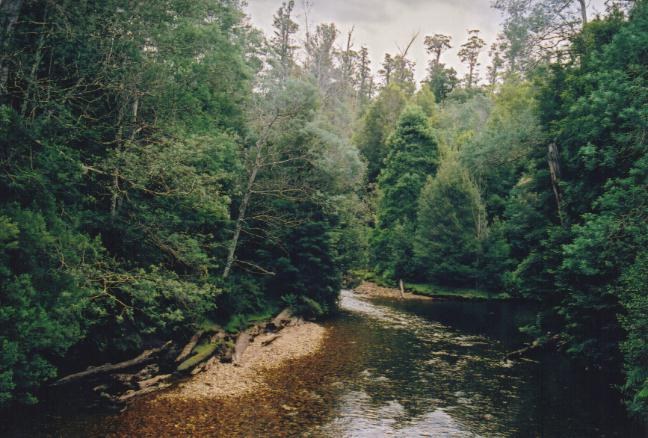
- Eucalyptus regnans surrounding the Styx River on the valley floor

- Location within Tasmania

Geography
- Location: Tasmania, Australia
- Population centers: Maydena
- Coordinates: 42.72°S 146.81°E
- Rivers: Styx River
- Interactive map of Styx Valley

The Styx Valley is a valley located adjacent to the Tasmanian Wilderness World Heritage Area in the island state of Tasmania, Australia. The Styx River is the main drainage system of the valley that lies about 100 kilometres (62 mi) northwest of Hobart, with the nearest town being Maydena.

== Location and features ==
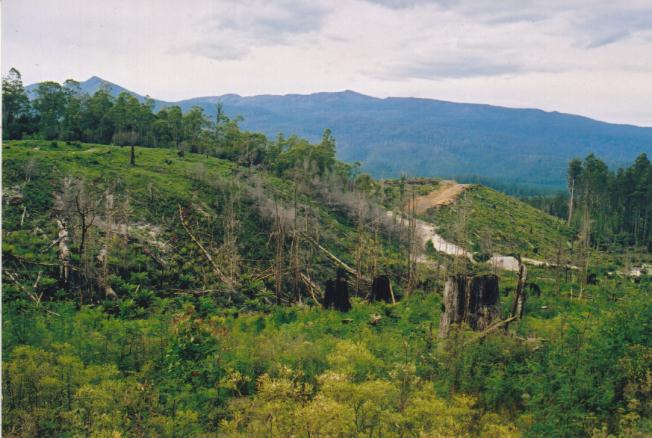
Clear-felled forest in the Styx Valley; old-growth trees to the right and pine plantations in the distance

Temperate wet eucalypt forests in the region are home to the world's tallest flowering plants, Eucalyptus regnans. Rainforest gullies are carpeted in mosses and lichens and shaded by the tree ferns Dicksonia antarctica, known locally as man-ferns, and other rainforest tree species including southern sassafras (Atherosperma moschatum), myrtle beech (Nothofagus cunninghamii) and celery-top pine (Phyllocladus aspleniifolius).

In 2002, Australia's most massive tree, nicknamed El Grande, was discovered. It died in an autumn burn in 2003.

The valley has been the site of an ongoing conflict between environmentalists, who have proposed the protection of the site as a national park, and supporters of the logging industry. One of the environmentalists' arguments, as well as the environmental benefits, was that a tourism-based economy would be more beneficial for the local economy than logging the area.

Community blockades including tree sits have been supported by Greenpeace and the Tasmanian Wilderness Society. Gandalf's Staff, an 85-metre (279 ft) tall eucalypt, holds the world record for supporting the highest tree sit platform. The campaign was successful in gaining protection for the proposed clearfell coupe containing some of the tallest trees, and protection was proposed by the Latham opposition in 2004 for an area of the northern Styx Valley containing a high conservation value old growth forest. Campaigning to fully protect the area continues, including the use of citizen science to identify threatened species and areas of significance and then apply for their protection through the use of state regulations.

== See also ==
- List of valleys of Australia § Tasmania
- Upper Florentine Valley
