= Triarius (disambiguation) =

Triarius was a Gothic nobleman and soldier.

Triarius may also refer to:

- Triarius (tree), an 86.5-metre-high Eucalyptus regnans (swamp gum tree) in Tasmania
- Triarius (beetle) is a genus of skeletonizing leaf beetles in the family Chrysomelidae
- Triarii, elements of early Roman military legions, consisting of wealthy and older men
