= El Grande (tree) =

Tree in Tasmania, Australia

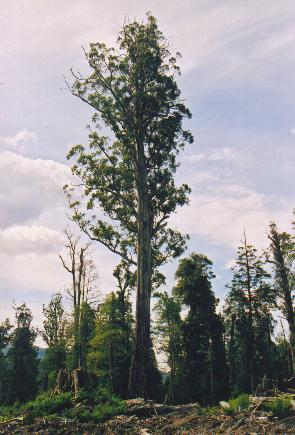
Named El Grande by the Wilderness Society.

El Grande was a massive Eucalyptus (Eucalyptus regnans) in Tasmania and Australia's largest tree. It was located on a ridge in the upper Derwent valley, adjacent to the World Heritage Area of the Florentine Valley, approximately 100 kilometres (62 mi) from Hobart. The tree stood 79 metres (259 ft) in height, had a girth of 19 metres (62 ft), and a volume of 439 cubic metres. While it was not the tallest tree in Australia, it was considered to be the largest in terms of volume, and the world's biggest-stemmed flowering plant.

Approximately 350 years old, it was burned in April 2003, and died in December 2003, as the result of catching fire in a burn-off of the debris remaining after the clear-felling of old-growth forest in the tree's immediate vicinity. Australian forestry officials admitted responsibility for killing the tree. Its hollow trunk acted like a furnace so that it was cooked from the inside.

The death of the tree, which had already been used as a symbol in the Wilderness Society's campaign against logging, brought national and international media attention. The destruction of El Grande became a symbol for the destruction of Tasmanian forests. Scrutiny intensified the use of Tasmania's forests for wood chip exportation, and the processes involved.

In the later half of 2003, Forestry Tasmania decided to remove individual names from the state's giant trees, but later relented. Other giant trees in the area of El Grande which are also protected by Forestry Tasmania's Giant Trees Policy, have since been named Centurion, which was discovered in 2008, and Triarius. Trees in the vicinity that had been named previously by the Wilderness Society include the Chapel tree and Gandalf's Staff.

== See also ==
- List of the world's most largest tree species
- List of the tallest tree species in the world
- List of individual trees
