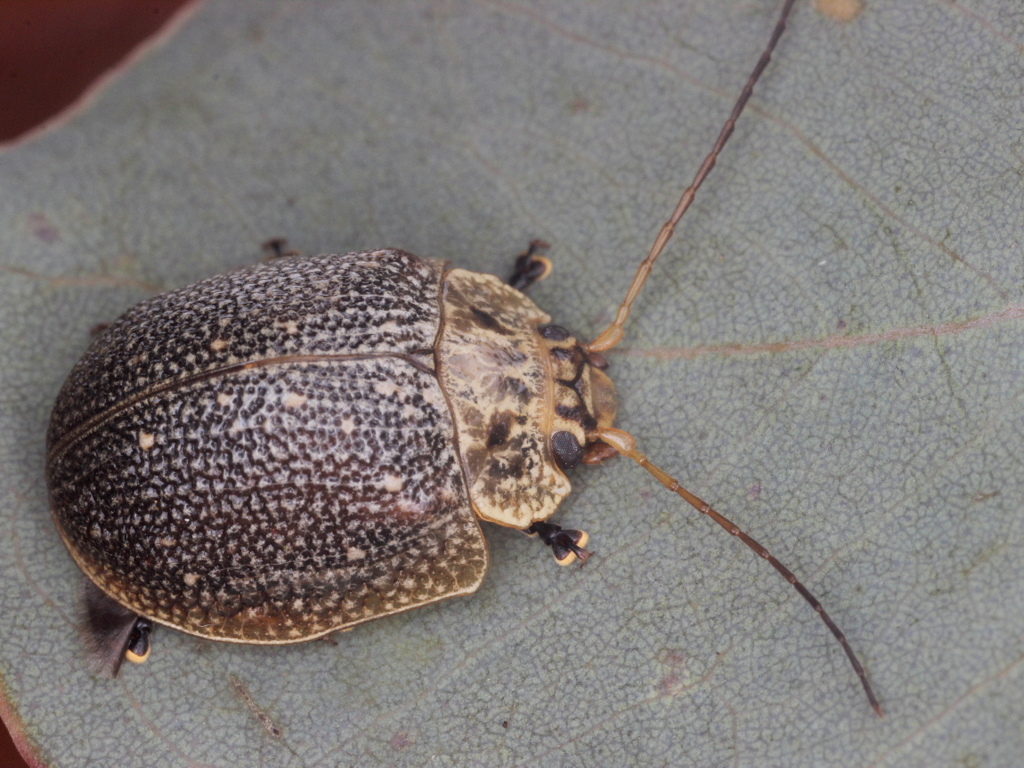
- Paropsis intermedia

Scientific classification
- Domain: Eukaryota
- Kingdom: Animalia
- Phylum: Arthropoda
- Class: Insecta
- Order: Coleoptera
- Suborder: Polyphaga
- Infraorder: Cucujiformia
- Family: Chrysomelidae
- Subfamily: Chrysomelinae
- Genus: Paropsis; Olivier, 1807

Type species
- Paropsis obsoleta Olivier, 1807

Species
- Paropsis ornata; Paropsis atomaria; See complete list in text

Synonyms
- Parona (Berg, 1895); Procris Weise, 1901 (preoccupied); Procrisina Aslam, 1968

= Paropsis =

Paropsine Leaf Beetle

Genus of beetles

Paropsis is a genus of Chrysomelidae, commonly referred to as tortoise beetles, which includes over 70 described species. Their small size, bright colours and patterns, and roughly hemispherical shape cause them to be mistaken for beetles in the family Coccinellidae (ladybirds). They are distributed across Australia, New Zealand and Papua New Guinea. Some species, Paropsis atomaria in particular, have been introduced to the United States in California with first official documented sightings in 2022. They primarily feed on Eucalyptus but there are a few that feed on Baeckea, Kunzea and Leptospermum. Species within this genus are noted as pests. For example, Paropsis charybdis is a pest of Eucalyptus in New Zealand.

== Gallery ==
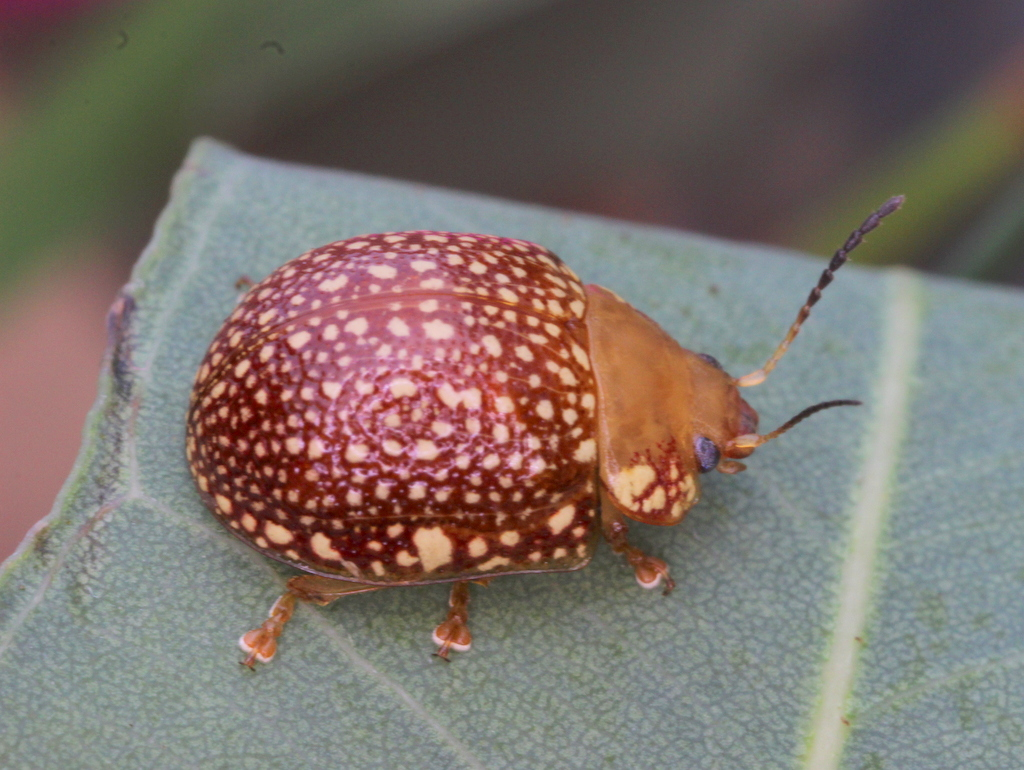
Paropsis ornata

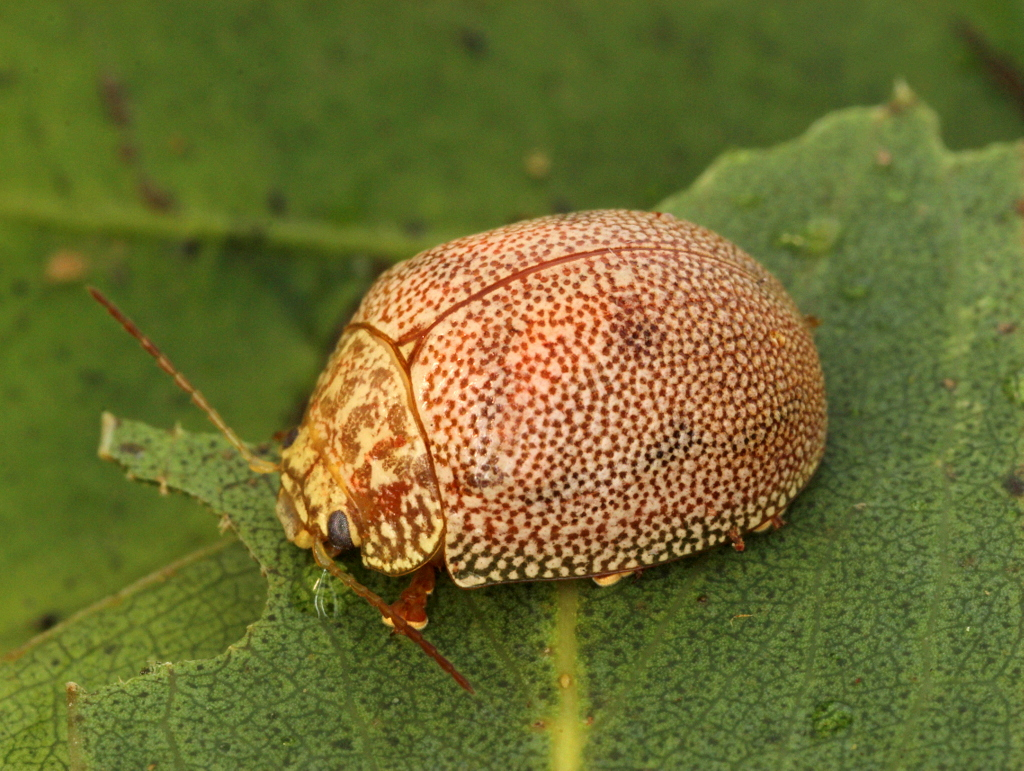
Paropsis atomaria

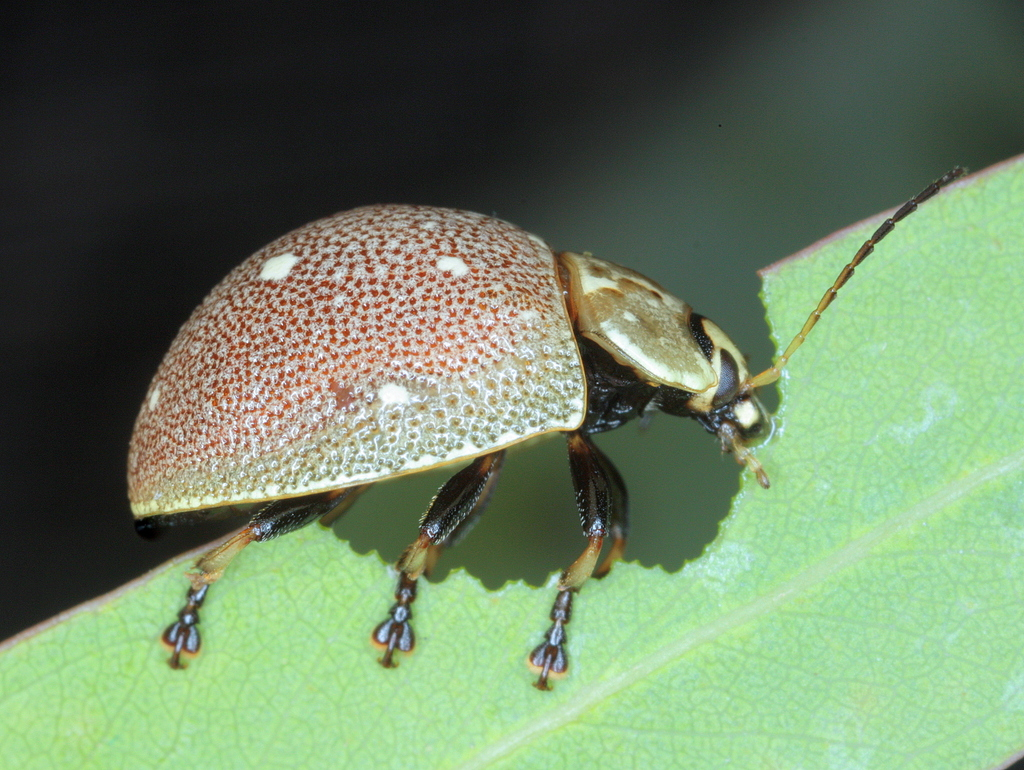
Paropsis aegrota

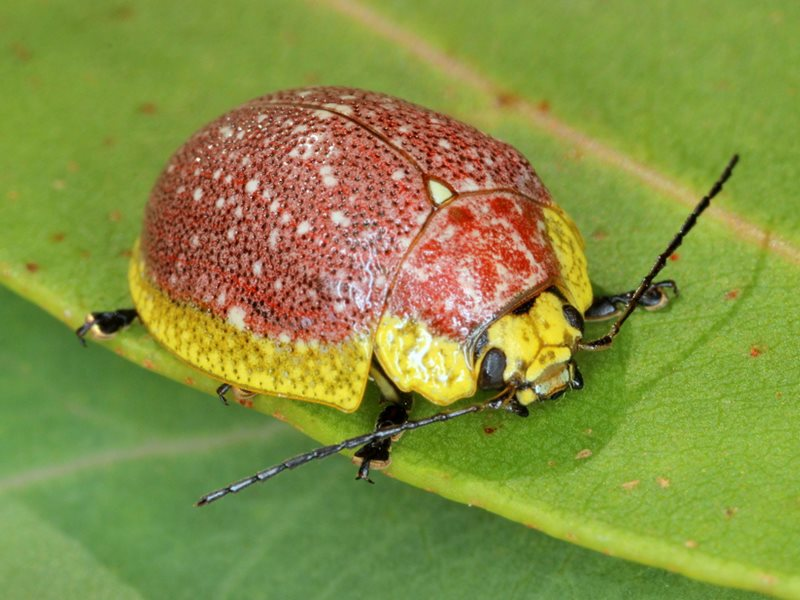
Paropsis bella

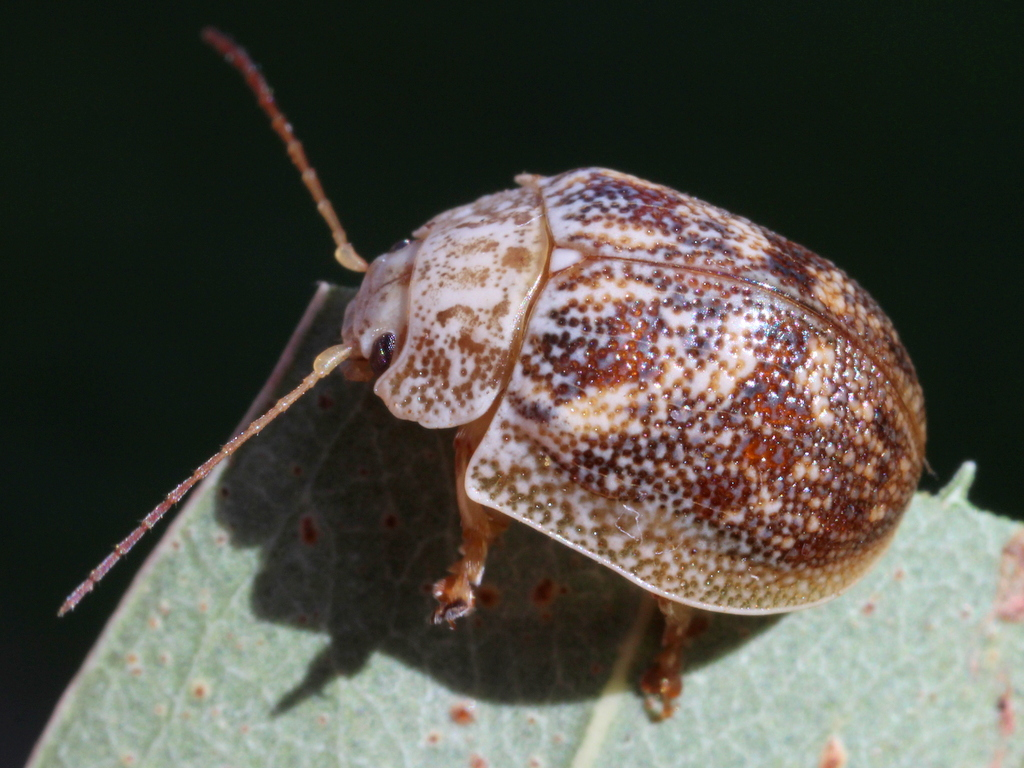
Paropsis charybdis

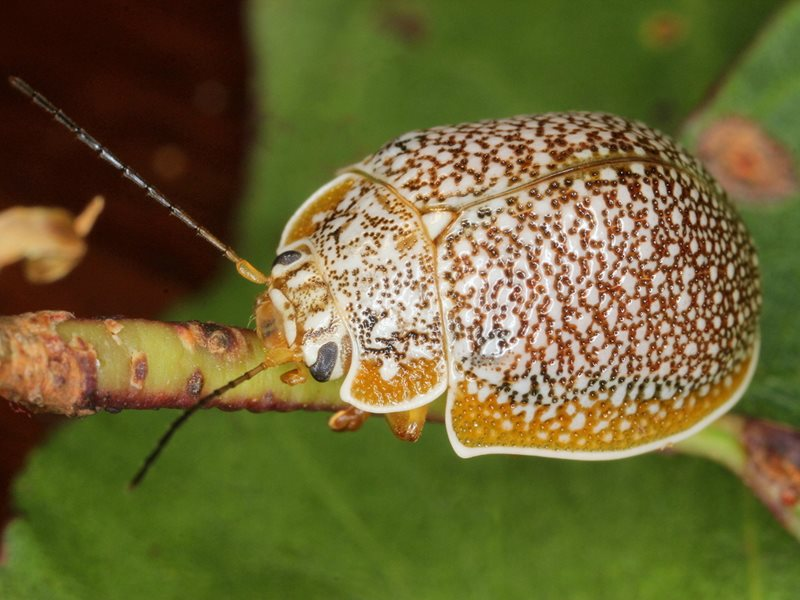
Paropsis dilatata

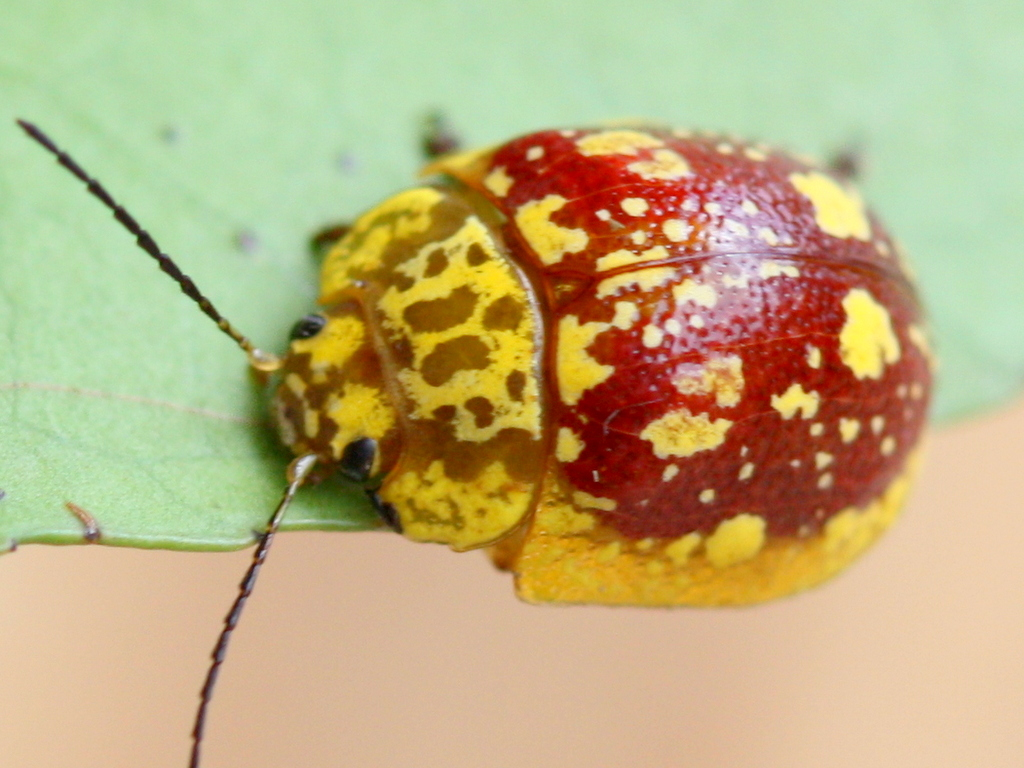
Paropsis maculata

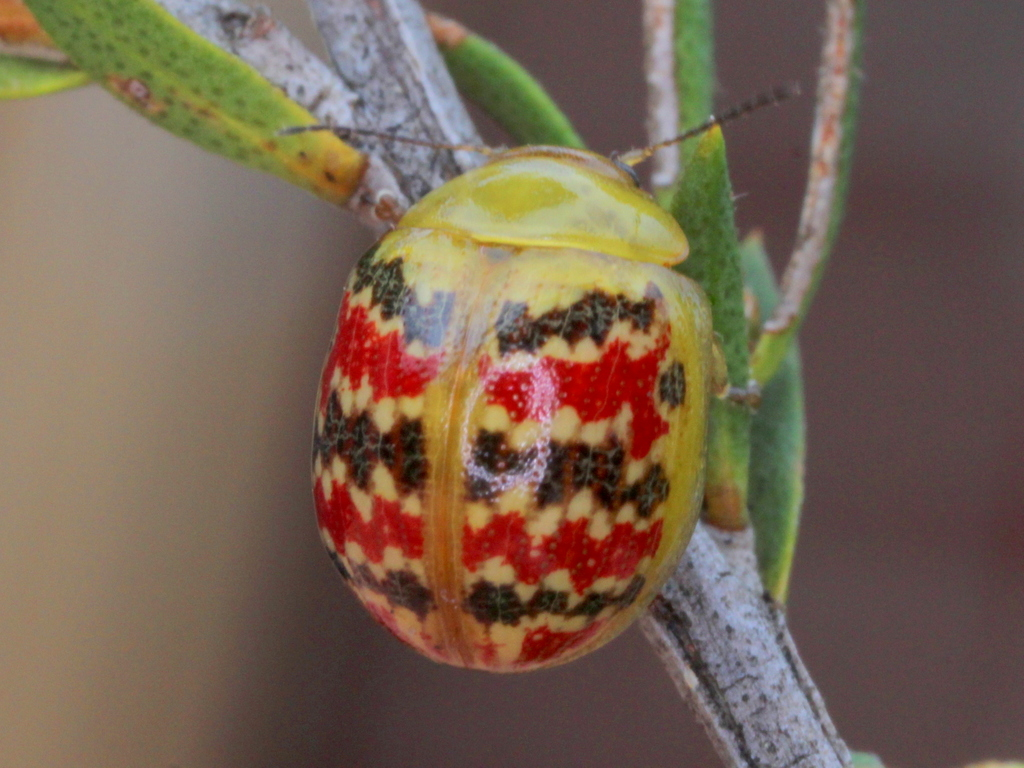
Paropsis minor

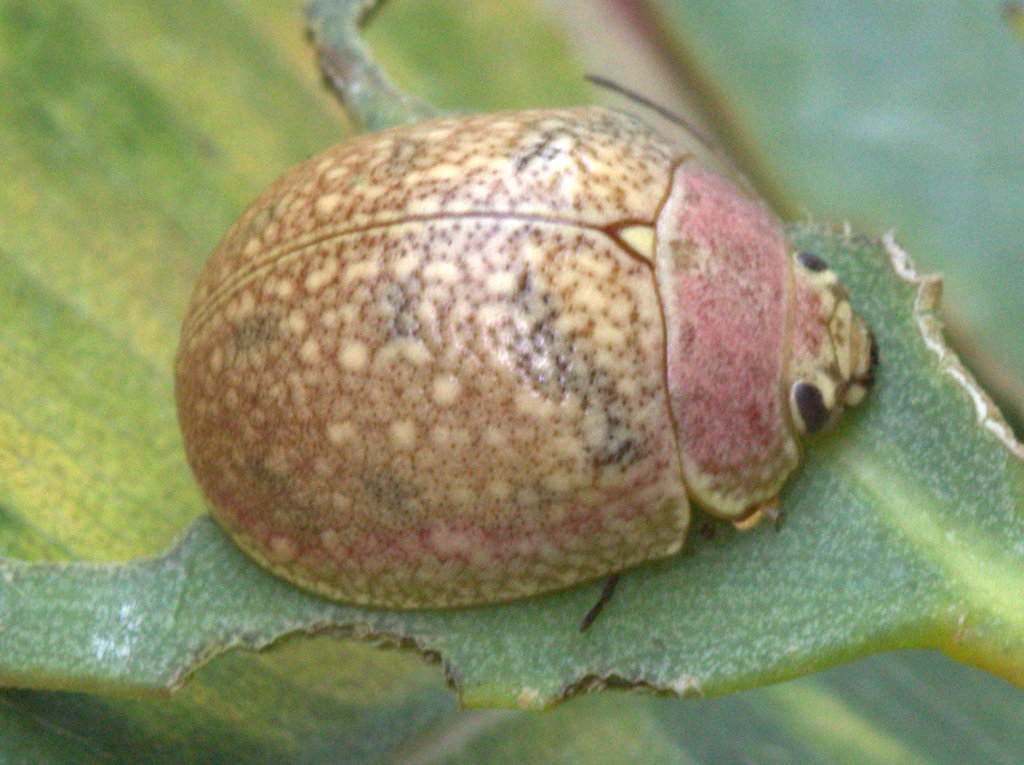
Paropsis roseola

== Species ==
- Paropsis aciculata Chapuis, 1877
- Paropsis advena Blackburn, 1894
- Paropsis aegrota Boisduval, 1835
- Paropsis affinis Blackburn, 1894
- Paropsis angusticollis Blackburn, 1894
- Paropsis aspera Chapuis, 1877
- Paropsis atomaria Olivier, 1807
- Paropsis augusta Blackburn, 1901
- Paropsis bella Blackburn, 1894
- Paropsis binbinga Daccordi, 2003
- Paropsis bivulnerata Lea, 1924
- Paropsis blandina Blackburn, 1901
- Paropsis bovilli Blackburn, 1894
- Paropsis carnosa Baly, 1866
- Paropsis cerea Blackburn, 1894
- Paropsis charybdis Stål, 1860
- Paropsis confusa Blackburn, 1890
- Paropsis convexa Blackburn, 1894
- Paropsis deboeri Selman, 1983
- Paropsis delittlei Selman, 1983
- Paropsis deserti Blackburn, 1896
- Paropsis dilatata Erichson, 1842
- Paropsis elytrura Blackburn, 1901
- Paropsis formosa Chapuis, 1877
- Paropsis geographica Baly, 1866
- Paropsis glauca Blackburn, 1894
- Paropsis hebes Weise, 1917
- Paropsis hygea Blackburn, 1901
- Paropsis inquinata Weise, 1917
- Paropsis insularis Blackburn, 1890
- Paropsis intermedia Blackburn, 1894
- Paropsis irrorata Chapuis, 1877
- Paropsis latissima Blackburn, 1894
- Paropsis latona Blackburn, 1901
- Paropsis longicornis Blackburn, 1894
- Paropsis lownei Baly, 1866
- Paropsis lutea (Marsham, 1808)
- Paropsis maculata (Marsham, 1808)
- Paropsis mandibularis Weise, 1923
- Paropsis manto Blackburn, 1901
- Paropsis marmorea Olivier, 1807
- Paropsis minor (Marsham, 1808)
- Paropsis mintha Blackburn, 1901
- Paropsis montana Blackburn, 1894
- Paropsis morbillosa Boisduval, 1835
- Paropsis mutabilis Blackburn, 1894
- Paropsis mystica Blackburn, 1894
- Paropsis obsoleta Olivier, 1807
- Paropsis omphale Blackburn, 1901
- Paropsis ornata (Marsham, 1808)
- Paropsis pantherina Fauvel, 1862
- Paropsis paphia Stål, 1860
- Paropsis parryi Baly, 1866
- Paropsis pictipennis Boheman, 1859
- Paropsis ponderosa Lea, 1924
- Paropsis porosa Erichson, 1842
- Paropsis propinqua Baly, 1866
- Paropsis quadrimaculata (Marsham, 1808)
- Paropsis roseola Baly, 1866
- Paropsis rubidipes Blackburn, 1901
- Paropsis rufitarsis Chapuis, 1877
- Paropsis rugulosa Boisduval, 1835
- Paropsis sospita Blackburn, 1901
- Paropsis tasmanica Baly, 1866
- Paropsis thyone Blackburn, 1901
- Paropsis ustulata Olivier, 1807
- Paropsis variegata Blackburn, 1894
- Paropsis variolosa (Marsham, 1808)
- Paropsis wilsoni Baly, 1866
- Paropsis yilgarnensis Blackburn, 1892
- Paropsis zietzi Blackburn, 1894
