= Sherbrooke Forest =

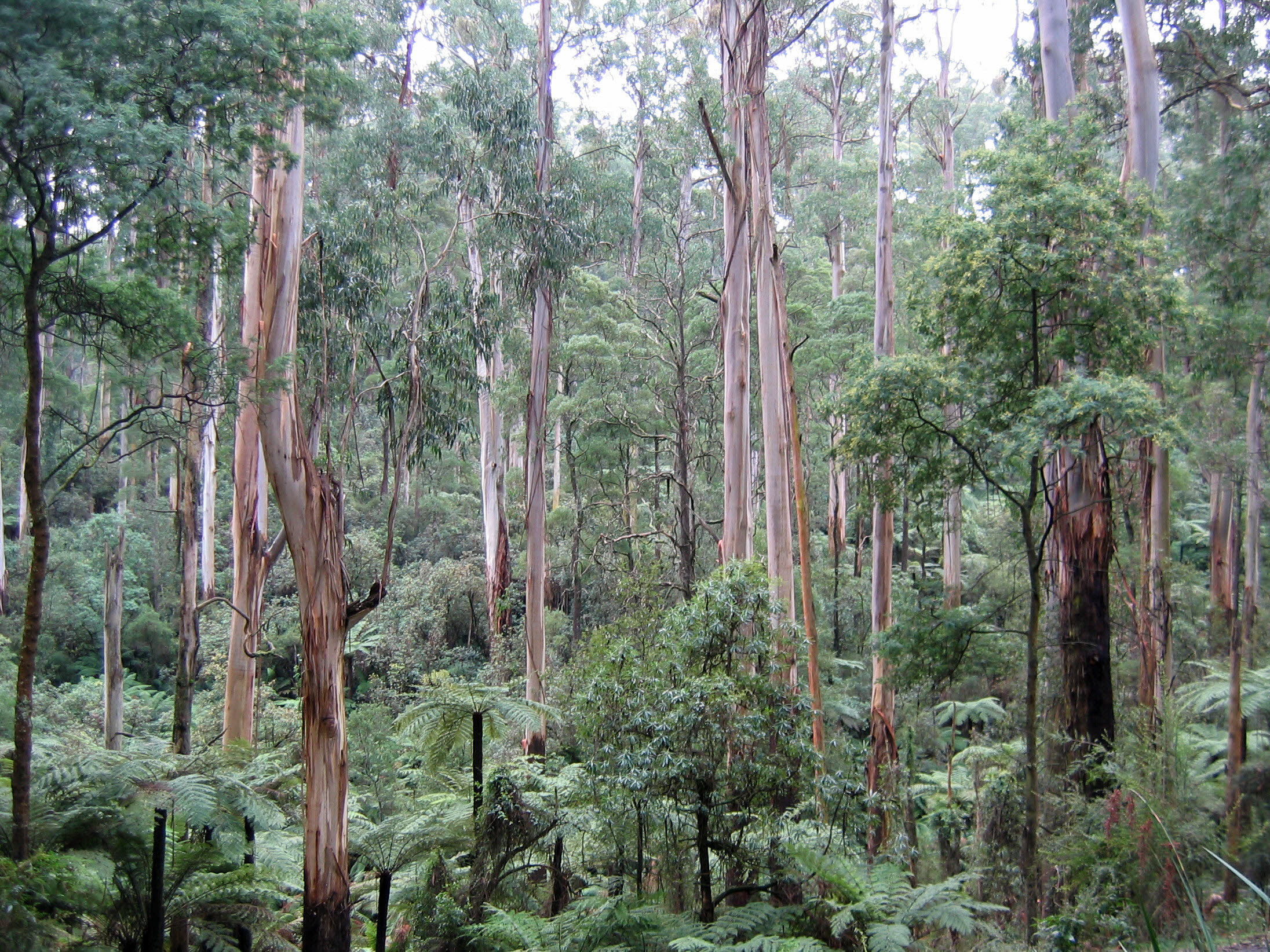
- Mountain ash (Eucalyptus regnans) trees in Sherbrooke Forest

- Location within Victoria
- Interactive map of Sherbrooke Forest

Geography
- Location: Victoria, Australia
- Coordinates: 37°53′43″S 145°21′47″E
- Elevation: 220–500 m asl

Ecology
- Dominant tree species: Mountain ash

Sherbrooke Forest is a wet sclerophyll forest within Dandenong Ranges National Park, 40 km east of Melbourne, in Victoria, Australia, close to the suburb of Belgrave. It lies within an altitude of 220–500 m ASL and is dominated by the tallest flowering plant in the world: mountain ash (Eucalyptus regnans).

== History ==
Sherbrooke Forest is situated within the historic territory of the indigenous Wurundjeri clan, of the Woiwurrung people, of the Kulin nation.

From the mid-19th century until 1930 the forest was logged. In 1958 it was gazetted as a park, and in 1987 it was merged with Doongalla Reserve and Ferntree Gully National Park to form the 32.15 km^{2} Dandenong Ranges National Park.

== Attractions ==
Grants Picnic Ground is located within the forest. This site features a kiosk, public toilets, drinking fountains, and park benches.

Sherbrooke Falls is a small waterfall that can be accessed via the walking trails.

Puffing Billy Railway runs through the southernmost edge of Sherbrooke Forest, near the Belgrave terminus.

== Fauna and flora ==
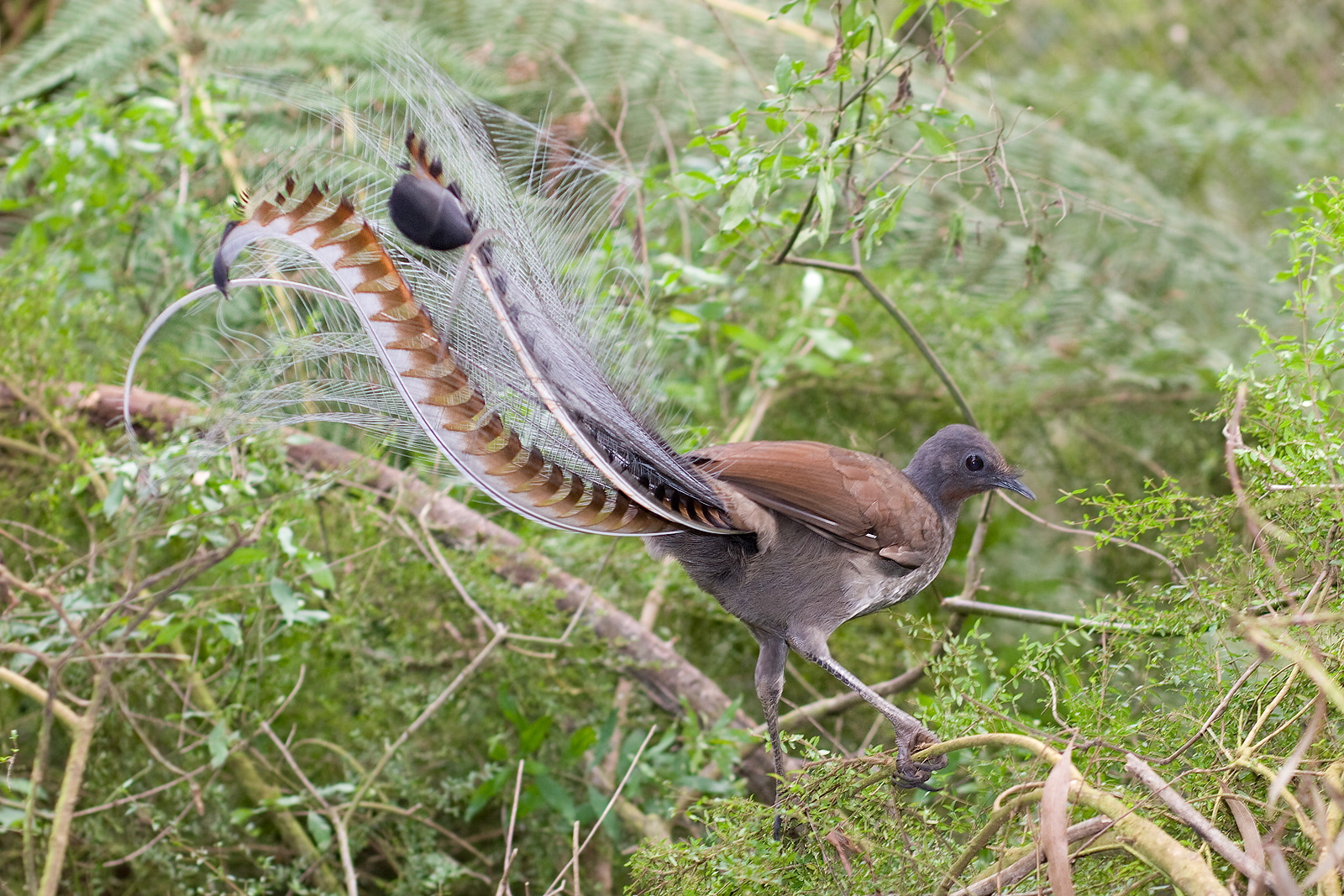
Superb lyrebird (Menura novaehollandiae)

The dominant tree species in Sherbrooke Forest is the mountain ash (Eucalyptus regnans), which is the tallest flowering plant in the world, and the second tallest plant overall, after the California redwood (Sequoia sempervirens). The understory consists of a variety of plants, including many tree ferns.

Sherbrooke Forest is famous for its population of superb lyrebirds (Menura novaehollandiae) and was an early, and still important, site for the study and conservation of this species. One of the early lyrebird researchers and sound recordists of the 1930s was Raymond Littlejohns. Another researcher who analysed lyrebird song was Konstantin Halafoff.
