= David Ashton (botanist) =

Australian botanist and ecologist (1927–2005)

David Hungerford Ashton OAM (6 July 1927 – 22 November 2005) was an Australian botanist and ecologist. He was the world expert on Eucalyptus regnans forests, claimed to be the most important timber species in Australia.

Ashton was born in Melbourne. He received his Bachelor of Science in 1949, and a PhD in 1957. He taught for thirty years at the University of Melbourne, from 1962 to 1992, influencing several generations of Victorian botanists and foresters. His professional expertise ranged from angiosperms, pteridophytes, bryophytes, lichens and fungi. He was also able to synthesise many biological problems ecologically, especially in mountain ash forests including geology, plant and animal species interactions, the effects of fire and climate, insect and seed dispersal. He wrote more than 200 scientific articles in over 20 publications.

Since 2000, 'The David Ashton Biodiversity and Ecosystems Award' has been awarded annually for the best Victorian ecological research.

He was awarded the Medal of the Order of Australia in 2001, "For service to the science of plant ecology, particularly in the areas of forest regeneration, conservation and management."
