= Raymond Littlejohns =

Raymond Trewolla Littlejohns (13 August 1893 - 22 January 1961) was an Australian accountant, amateur ornithologist and bird photographer.

== Reputation ==
Littlejohns is especially known for his efforts in photography and sound recording of the lyrebirds of Sherbrooke Forest near Melbourne, Victoria. Littlejohns joined the Royal Australasian Ornithologists Union (RAOU) in 1912 and served on its council for many years, including its presidency 1959–1960.

== Publications ==
Littlejohns was a contributor to Emu and to Walkabout and books he authored or coauthored include:

- Littlejohns, Raymond Trewolla; & Lawrence, S.A. (1920). Birds of Our Bush, or Photography for Nature-Lovers. Whitcombe & Tombs Ltd: Melbourne.
- Littlejohns, Raymond Trewolla. (1933). The Magic Voice. A story of the Australian Lyre-bird. Ramsay Publishing Pty Ltd: Melbourne.
- Littlejohns, Raymond Trewolla. (1938). The Lyre-Bird. Australia's wonder-songster. Angus & Robertson Ltd: Sydney.
- Littlejohns, Raymond Trewolla. (1947). Lyrebirds Calling from Australia. Robertson & Mullens: Melbourne.

== Death ==
Raymond Littlejohns died on 22 January 1961 in Elwood, aged 67.

== Memorial ==
Raymond Littlejohns is commemorated by the Ray T. Littlejohns Memorial Seat in Sherbrooke.
