= Konstantin Halafoff =

Russian-Australian poet and ornithologist

Konstantin Ciryl Halafoff or K. C. Halafoff (1902–1969) was a Russian white emigre and Australian poet and ornithologist interested in the musicology of bird song.

Halafoff was born in 1902 in Moscow. After the Bolshevik Revolution in Russia he served with the White Army. In 1920 he moved to Yugoslavia where he resumed his interrupted studies and graduated from Belgrade University. After the Second World War he fled to Germany where he lived until moving to Australia in 1949. He published his poetry in various Russian emigre publications in Europe and Australia; one of his contributions being an essay on musical aspects of Boris Pasternak's language, published in a Russian literary review in Munich.

Halafoff studied the complex vocalisations of superb lyrebirds in Australia, especially in Sherbrooke Forest. Articles and notes he wrote about lyrebirds and other birds that were published in the 1950s, 1960s and early 1970 include:

- 1958 – Lyrebirds of Sherbrooke. Victorian Naturalist 74(11): 157–63.
- 1958 – Sherbrooke Diary. Victorian Naturalist 75(7): 105–112.
- 1959 – A Lyrebird dancing in a pool. Emu 59: 220.
- 1959 – Musical analysis of the lyrebird's song. Victorian Naturalist 75: 169–78.
- 1959 – The range of the lyrebird's song. Victorian Naturalist 76: 121.
- 1961 – Writing down a lyrebird's song. Victorian Naturalist 77: 335–338, 359–363.
- 1961 – Notes on the lyrebird's song. Victorian Naturalist 78: 79–81.
- 1962 – A strange duet. Emu 62: 62.
- 1964 – Audiospectrographic analysis of the lyrebird's song. Victorian Naturalist 80: 304–12.
- 1968 – A survey of birds’ music. Emu 68: 21–40.
- 1970 – Notes of Lyrebird dialects. Victorian Naturalist 78: 1.

Halafoff died in 1969 in Ferntree Gully a suburb of Melbourne, aged 67.
