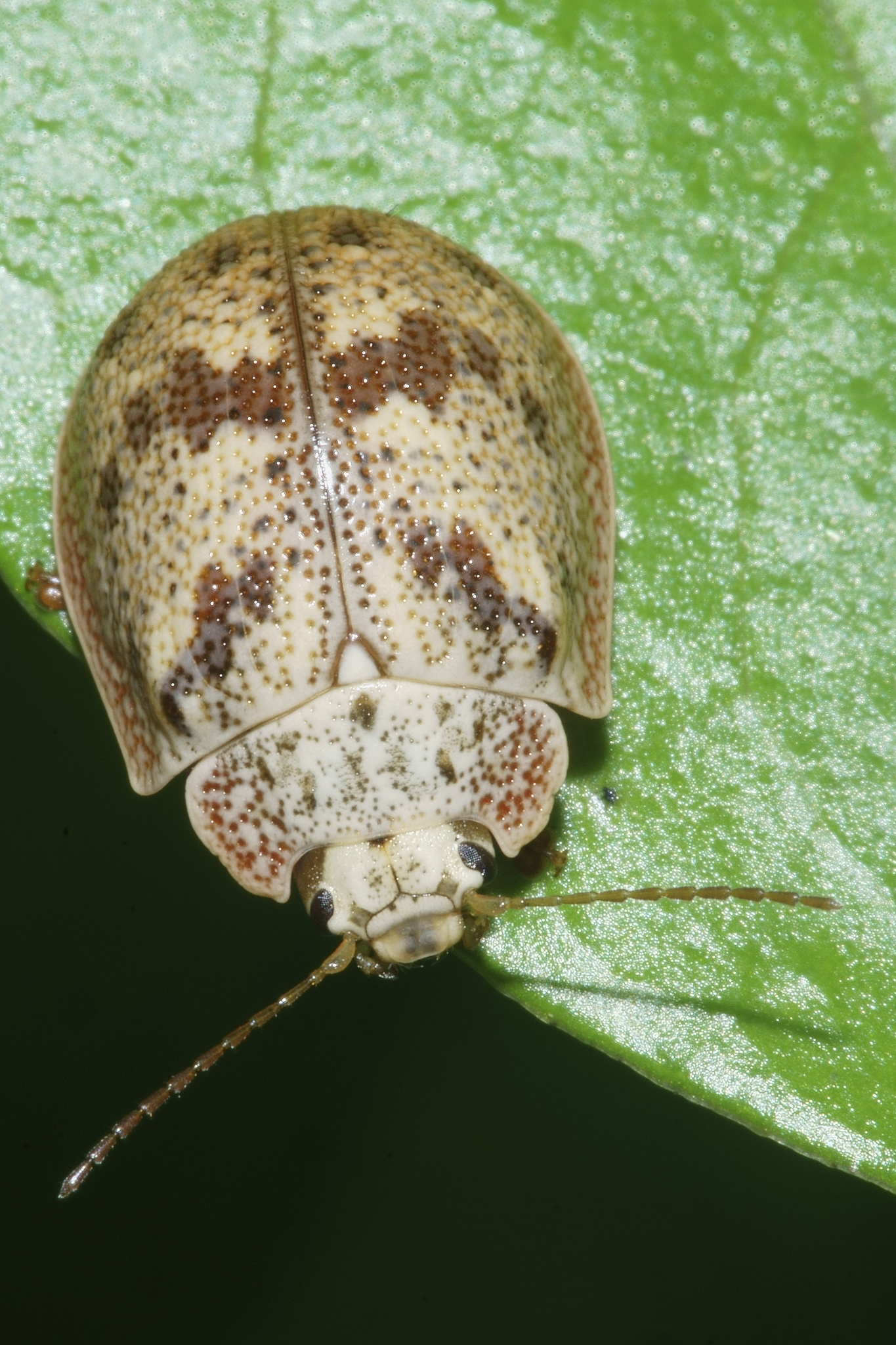
- Adult
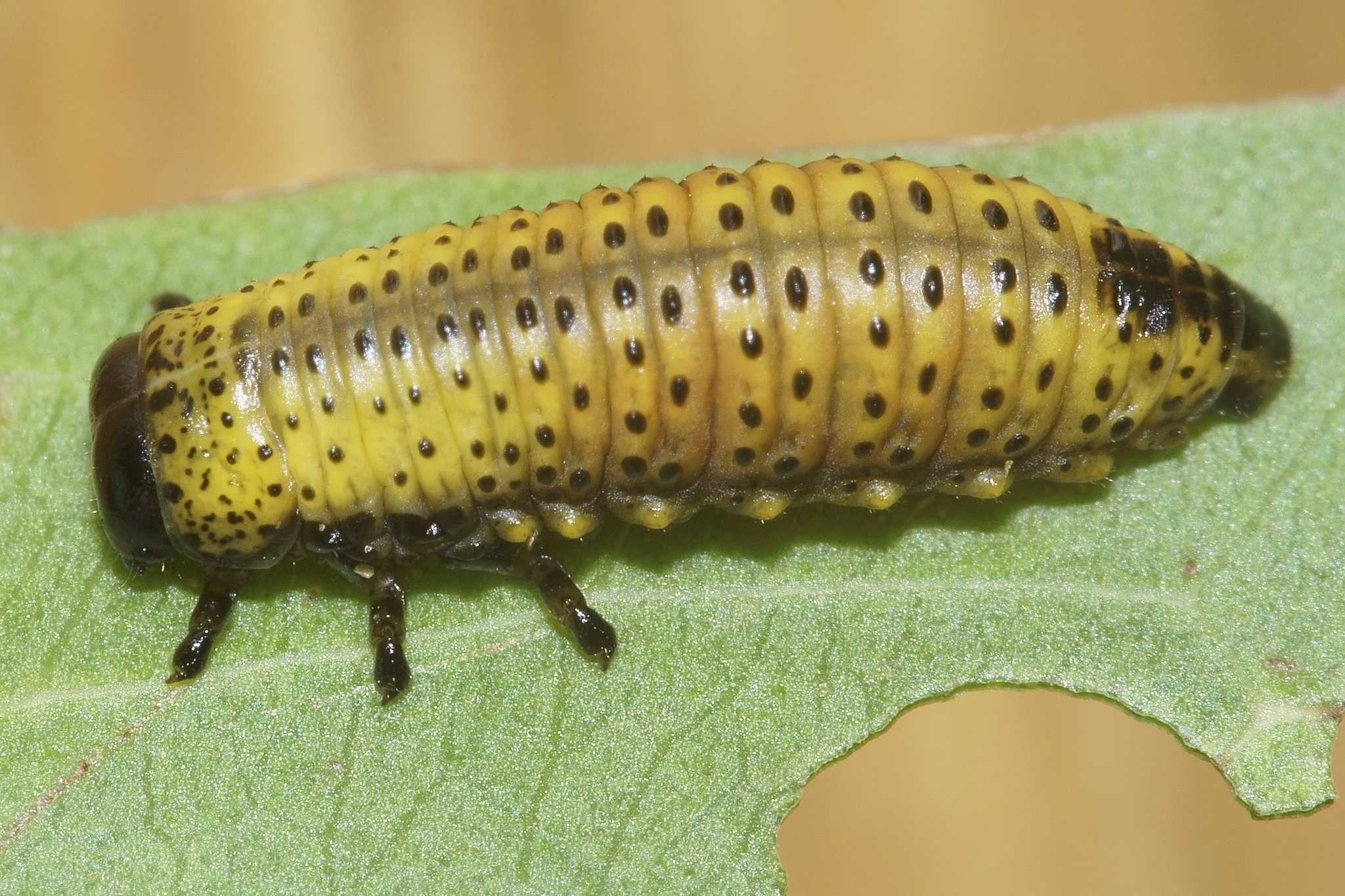
- Larva

Scientific classification
- Kingdom: Animalia
- Phylum: Arthropoda
- Class: Insecta
- Order: Coleoptera
- Suborder: Polyphaga
- Infraorder: Cucujiformia
- Family: Chrysomelidae
- Genus: Paropsis
- Species: P. charybdis

Binomial name
- Paropsis charybdis Stål, 1860

= Paropsis charybdis =

Species of beetle

Paropsis charybdis, commonly known as the Eucalyptus tortoise beetle, is a species of leaf beetle belonging to the genus Paropsis. It is considered a pest of some species of Eucalyptus.

== Description ==
Paropsis charybdis is identified by its pale creamy-white elytra upon which are three broad transverse areas of darker colouration. The under surface is yellow-brown.

== Distribution ==
Paropsis charybdis is native to Australia, but has spread to nearby New Zealand.

== Behaviour and ecology ==
=== Parasites ===
The parasitoid wasps Ennogera nassaui and Eadya paropsidis have been used as a biological control agent for P. charybdis.

== Relationship to humans ==
=== As pests ===
Paropsis charybdis is the most serious defoliator of eucalyptus in New Zealand and is particularly associated with the subgenus Symphyomyrtus. The most severely attacked species include: E. globulus, E. viminalis, E. johnstonii, E. smithii, E. grandis, E. deanei, E. guilfoylei, E. macarthurii, E. longifolia, and E. quadrangulata.
