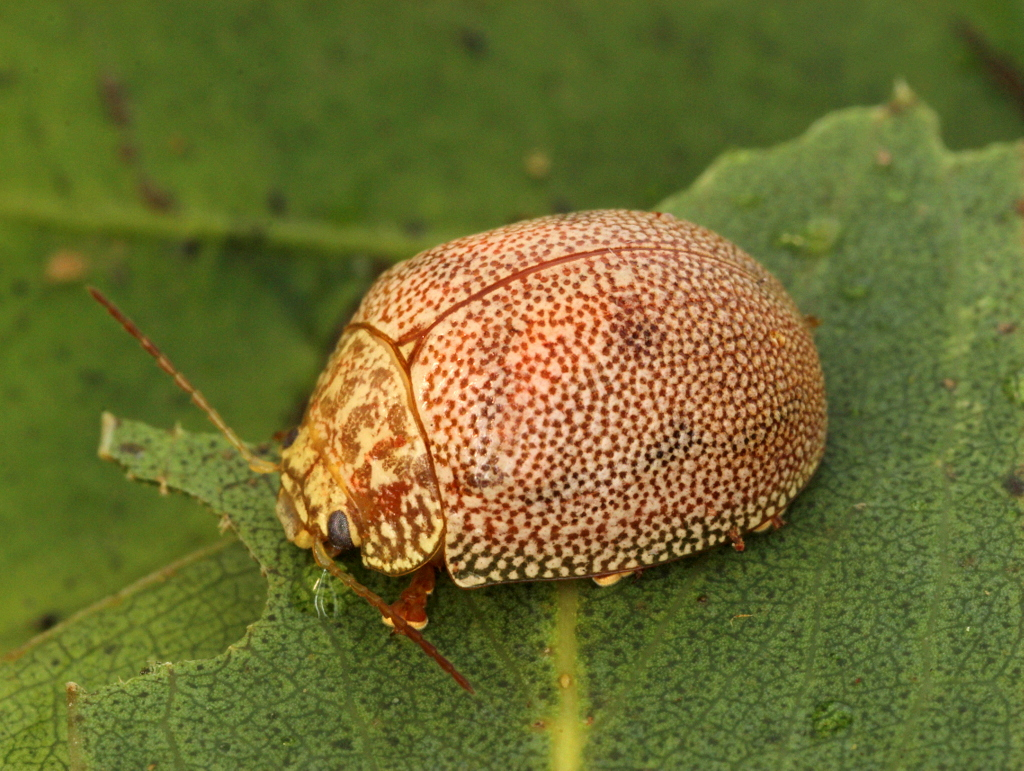
- Paropsis atomaria Olivier, 1807

Scientific classification
- Kingdom: Animalia
- Phylum: Arthropoda
- Class: Insecta
- Order: Coleoptera
- Suborder: Polyphaga
- Infraorder: Cucujiformia
- Family: Chrysomelidae
- Genus: Paropsis
- Species: P. atomaria

Binomial name
- Paropsis atomaria Olivier, 1807

= Paropsis atomaria =

Species of beetle

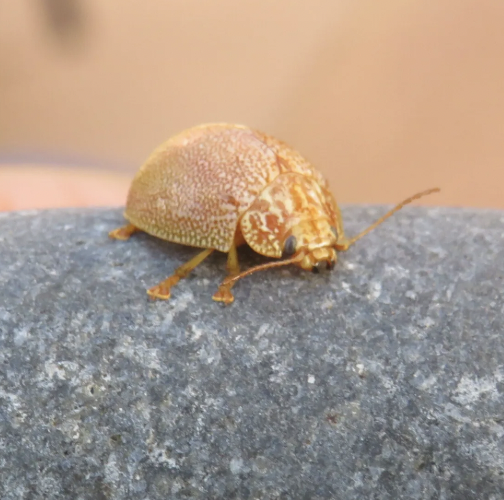

Paropsis atomaria is a common leaf beetle in the subfamily Chrysomelinae. The specific name, atomaria, translates to mean "speckled" or "freckled". This species is found across eastern Australia from Adelaide to Brisbane. P. atomaria typically produces two generations during the summer across most of its range. A female can lay up to 600 eggs, which are deposited at the tip of a leaf or twig. While not all Paropsis species are pests, P. atomaria is one of the few paropsines that may become a pest of plantation trees. This species has also been introduced to the west coast of North America.

== Gallery ==
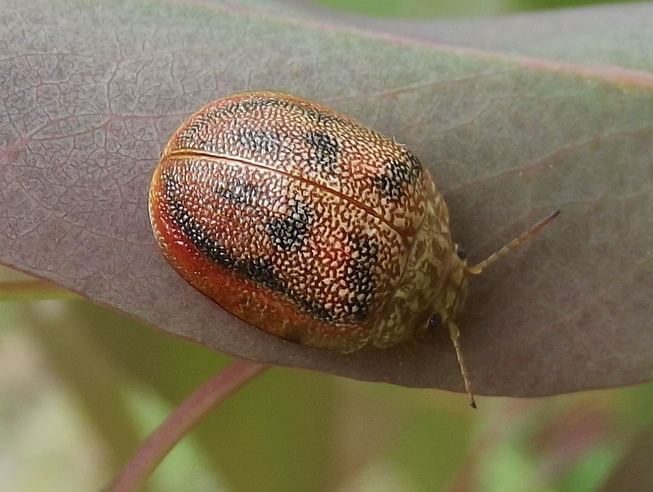
Paropsis atomaria

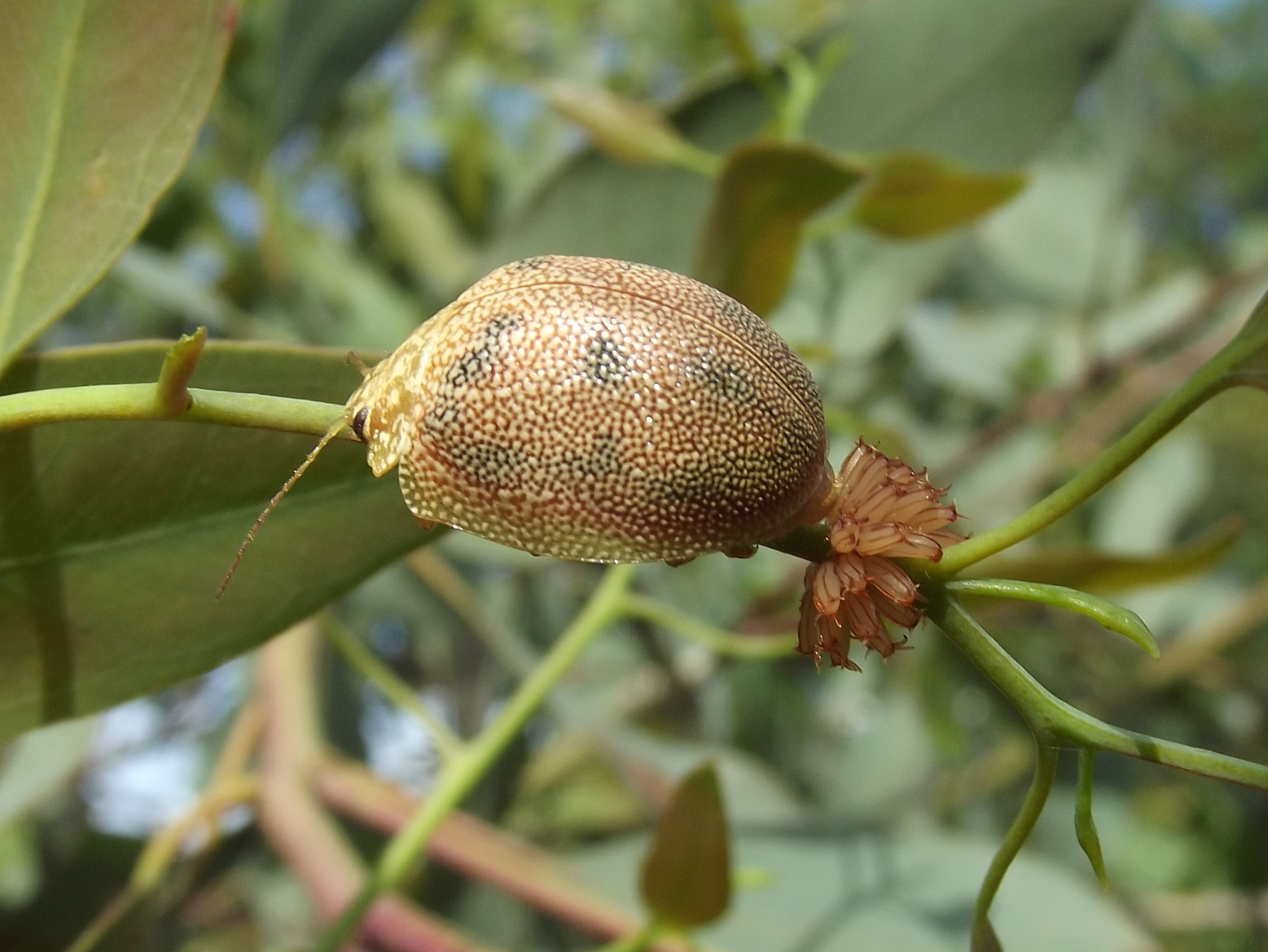
Paropsis atomaria laying eggs

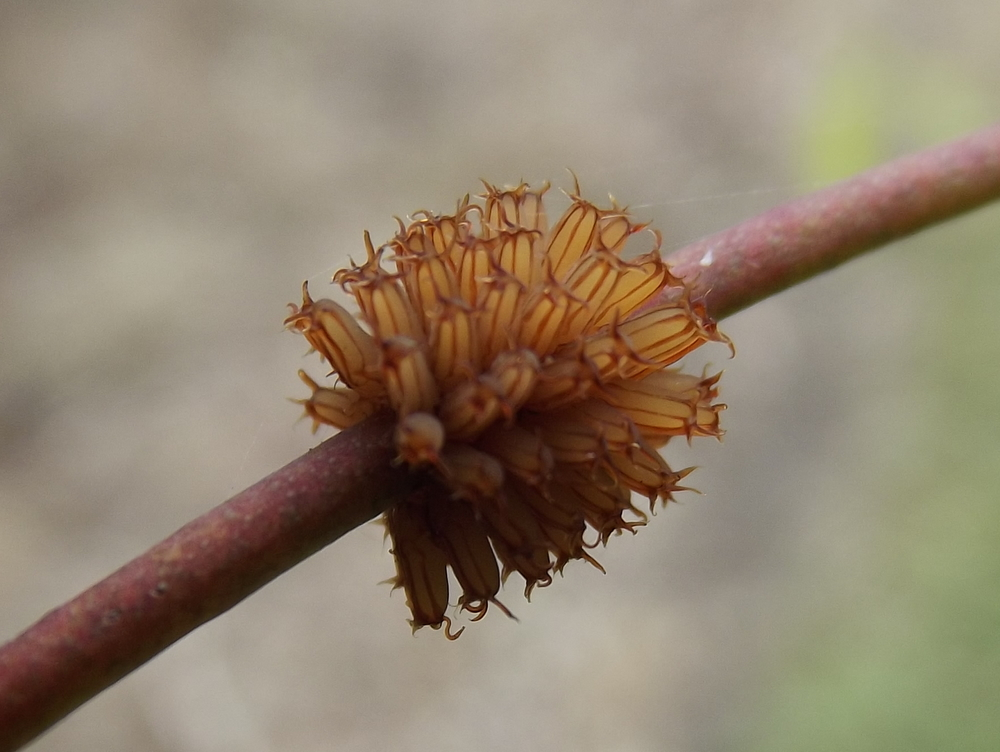
Paropsis atomaria eggs

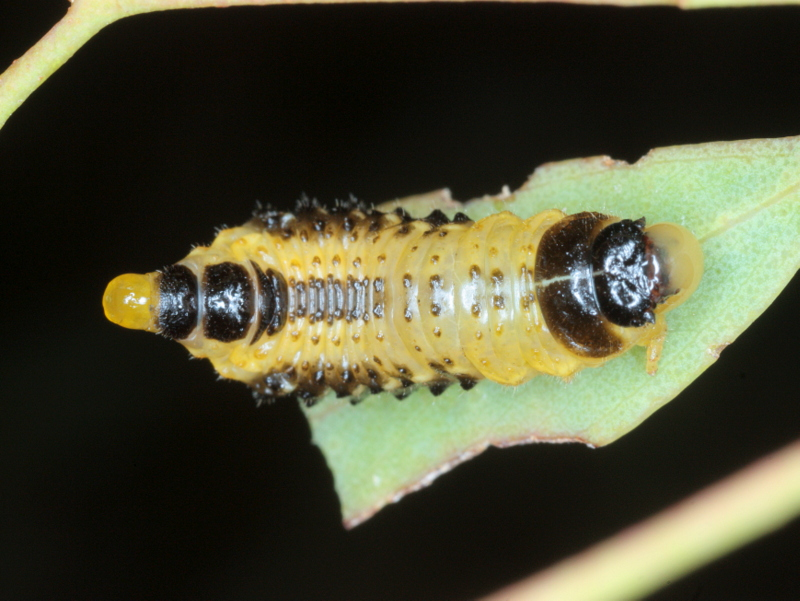
Paropsis atomaria larva
