= Centurion (tree) =

World's tallest Eucalyptus tree in Tasmania, Australia

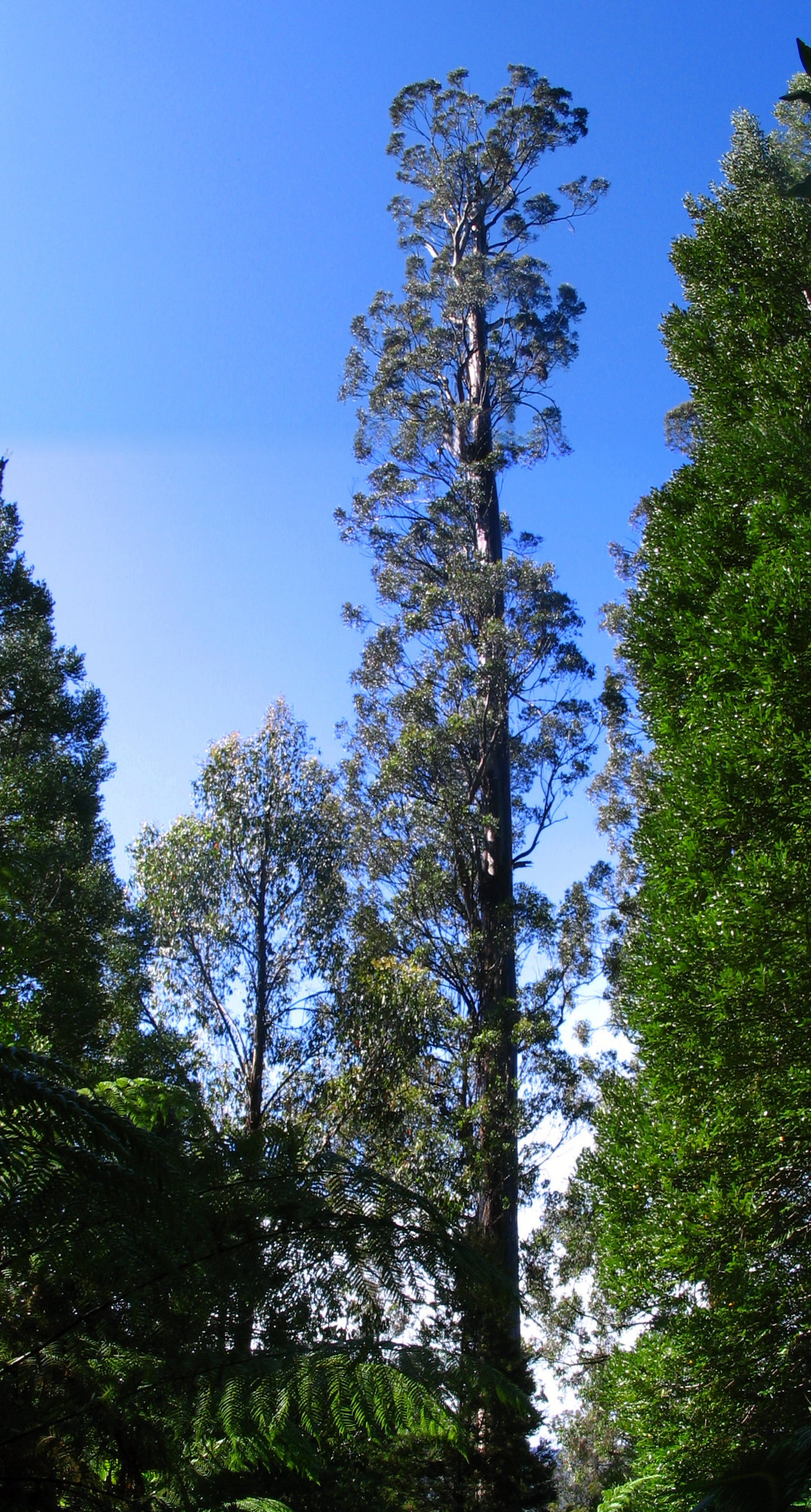
- A photo of Centurion taken in April 2009

- Location within Tasmania
- Species: Eucalyptus regnans
- Coordinates: 43°05′52″S 146°48′08″E
- Height: 96 m (315 ft)
- Diameter: 4.05 m (13.3 ft)

Centurion is the name given to a single Eucalyptus regnans tree growing in Southern Tasmania, Australia. The tree was first measured by climber-deployed tapeline at 99.6 metres (327 ft) tall in 2008, and was subsequently re-measured to be 100.5 metres (330 ft) tall by ground laser in 2018. This discovery places E. regnans as the third-tallest tree species in the world after the coast redwood and the Himalayan cypress (which is generally much shorter), and taller than both the Sitka spruce and Coastal Douglas Fir. Centurion was discovered in August 2008 by employees of Forestry Tasmania while analysing data collected by the LiDAR system used to map and assess state forest resources.

== Condition ==
Centurion grows in a small patch of very old forest surrounded by secondary forest, and it has survived logging and forest fires by coincidence. Near Centurion grew two other giant trees: the 86.5-metre-tall (284 ft) E. regnans named Triarius and The Prefect, which had a girth of 19 m until destroyed in the 2019 fires.

In February 2019, Centurion was damaged by a bushfire that devastated the surrounding area, but Centurion appears to have initially survived. A new hollow in the base was created by the fire.

== Height ==
Two post-2008 measurements indicated that the tree is growing, albeit very slowly. In January 2014 the tree was climbed; the tape-drop indicated the tree had grown to 99.82 m. However, a further tape-drop in 2016 indicated a lesser height of 99.67 m. Centurion was re-measured again by ground laser in December 2018 and was found to have possibly reached 100.5 meters in height. By 2025, largely from the 2019 Tasmanian fires, Centurion had lost 4 meters of height; it was measured at 96 meters tall, and many nearby trees had died. Centurion now ranks sixth among the world's tallest living trees.

The diameter of Centurion is 4.05 metres, its girth exceeds 12 metres, and its volume has been estimated at 268 cubic metres. The name "Centurion" was saved for the hundredth noble tree to be discovered by Forestry Tasmania and coincided with the height of the tree. Named after centurions (Roman officers), the root of the name contains centum, which in Latin means "one hundred". Centurion is alternately known as "the Bradman" as the height of the tree (at 99.82 metres) was close to the Test run average of the Australian cricketer Donald Bradman.

== See also ==
- List of individual trees
- List of tallest trees
- List of named Eucalyptus trees
