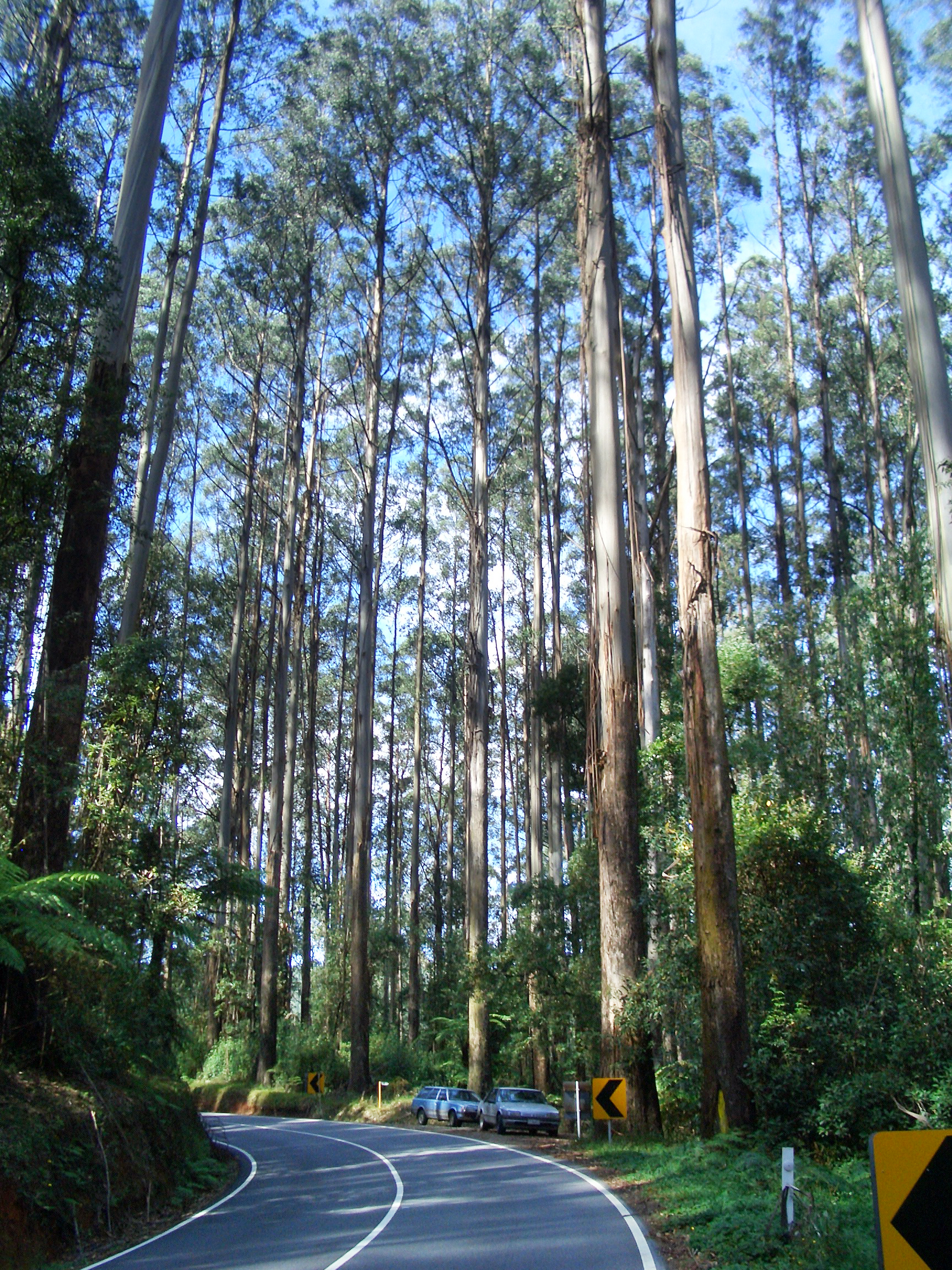
- Eucalyptus regnans on the Black Spur Range, Victoria.

Conservation status
- Least Concern (IUCN 3.1)

Scientific classification
- Kingdom: Plantae
- Clade: Tracheophytes
- Clade: Angiosperms
- Clade: Eudicots
- Clade: Rosids
- Order: Myrtales
- Family: Myrtaceae
- Genus: Eucalyptus
- Species: E. regnans

Binomial name
- Eucalyptus regnans F.Muell.

Synonyms
- Eucalyptus amygdalina var. colossea Maiden nom. inval., pro syn.; Eucalyptus amygdalina var. colossea Grimwade nom. inval., pro syn.; Eucalyptus amygdalina var. regnans F.Muell.; Eucalyptus inophloia Maiden nom. inval., pro syn.; Eucalyptus inophloia Grimwade nom. inval., pro syn.; Eucalyptus regnans F.Muell. var. regnans

= Eucalyptus regnans =

Mountain ash

Species of eucalyptus

Eucalyptus regnans, known variously as mountain ash (in Victoria), giant ash or swamp gum (in Tasmania), or stringy gum, is a species of very tall forest tree that is native to the Australian states of Tasmania and Victoria. It is a straight-trunked tree with smooth grey bark, but with a stocking of rough brown bark at the base, glossy green, lance-shaped to curved adult leaves, flower buds in groups of between nine and fifteen, white flowers, and cup-shaped or conical fruit. It is the tallest of all flowering plants; the tallest measured living specimen, named Centurion, stands 100 metres (328 feet) tall in Tasmania.

It often grows in pure stands in tall wet forest, sometimes with rainforest understorey, and in temperate, high rainfall areas with deep loam soils. A large number of the trees have been logged, including some of the tallest known. This species of eucalypt does not possess a lignotuber and is often killed by bushfire, regenerating from seed. Mature forests dominated by E. regnans have been found to store more carbon than any other forest known. The species is grown in plantations in Australia and in other countries. Along with E. obliqua and E. delegatensis it is known in the timber industry as Tasmanian oak.

== Description ==
Eucalyptus regnans is a broad-leaved, evergreen tree that typically grows to a height of 70–114 m (230–374 ft) but does not form a lignotuber. The crown is open and small in relation to the size of the rest of the tree. The trunk is straight with smooth, cream-coloured, greyish or brown bark with a stocking of more or less fibrous or flaky bark that extends up to 5–20 m (16–66 ft) at the base. The trunk typically reaches a diameter of 2.5 m (8 ft 2 in) at breast height (DBH). Young plants and coppice regrowth have glossy green, egg-shaped leaves that are held horizontally, 55–120 mm (2.2–4.7 in) long and 22–50 mm (0.87–1.97 in) wide and petiolate. Adult leaves are arranged alternately along the stems, the same shade of glossy green on both sides, lance-shaped to broadly lance-shaped or sickle-shaped, 90–230 mm (3.5–9.1 in) long and 15–50 mm (0.59–1.97 in) wide, tapering to a reddish petiole 8–25 mm (0.31–0.98 in) long. The upper and lower surfaces of the leaves are dotted with numerous tiny, circular or irregularly-shaped oil glands. Secondary leaf veins arise at an acute angle from the midvein and tertiary venation is sparse.

The flower buds are arranged in leaf axils in groups of between nine and fifteen on one or two unbranched peduncles 4–14 mm (0.16–0.55 in) long, the individual buds on pedicels 3–7 mm (0.12–0.28 in) long. Mature buds are oval, 4–7 mm (0.16–0.28 in) long and 2–4 mm (0.079–0.157 in) wide with a rounded operculum. Flowering occurs from March to May and the flowers are white. The fruit is a woody, cup-shaped or conical capsule 5–8 mm (0.20–0.31 in) long and 4–7 mm (0.16–0.28 in) wide on a pedicel 1–7 mm (0.039–0.276 in) long and usually with three valves near the level of the rim. The seeds are pyramid-shaped, 1.5–3 mm (0.059–0.118 in) long with the hilum at the end.

Seedlings have kidney shaped cotyledons, and the first two to three pairs of leaves are arranged in opposite pairs along the stem, then alternate.

== Taxonomy ==
Eucalyptus regnans was first formally described in 1871 by Victorian botanist Ferdinand von Mueller in the Annual Report of the Victorian Acclimatisation Society. He gave the specific epithet (regnans) from the Latin word meaning "ruling". Mueller noted that "[t]his species or variety, which might be called Eucalyptus regnans, represents the loftiest tree in British Territory." However, until 1882 he considered the tree to be a form or variety of the Tasmanian black peppermint (Eucalyptus amygdalina) and called it thus, not using the binomial name Eucalyptus regnans until the Systematic Census of Australian Plants in 1882, and giving it a formal diagnosis in 1888 in Volume 1 of the Key to the System of Victorian Plants, where he describes it as "stupendously tall". Von Mueller did not designate a type specimen, nor did he use the name Eucalyptus regnans on his many collections of "White Mountain Ash" at the Melbourne Herbarium. Victorian botanist Jim Willis selected a lectotype in 1967, one of the more complete collections of a specimen from the Dandenong Ranges, that von Mueller had noted was one "of the tall trees measured by Mr D. Boyle in March 1867."

Eucalyptus regnans is widely known as the mountain ash, due to the resemblance of its wood to that of the northern hemisphere ash (Fraxinus). Swamp gum is a name given to it in Tasmania, as well as stringy gum in northern Tasmania. Other common names include white mountain ash, giant ash, stringy gum, swamp gum and Tasmanian oak. Von Mueller called it the "Giant gum-tree" and "Spurious blackbutt" in his 1888 Key to the System of Victorian Plants. The timber has been known as "Tasmanian oak", because early settlers likened the strength of its wood to that of English oak (Quercus robur).

The brown barrel (Eucalyptus fastigata) is a close relative of mountain ash, with the two sharing the rare trait in eucalypts of paired inflorescences arising from axillary buds. Botanist Ian Brooker classified the two in the series Regnantes. The latter species differs in having brown fibrous bark all the way up its trunk, and was long classified as a subspecies of E. regnans. The series lies in the section Eucalyptus of the subgenus Eucalyptus within the genus Eucalyptus.

=== Population genetics ===
Genetic testing across its range of chloroplast DNA yielded 41 haplotypes, divided broadly into Victorian and Tasmanian groups, but also showing distinct profiles for some areas such as East Gippsland, and north-eastern and south-eastern Tasmania, suggesting the species had persisted in these areas during the Last Glacial Maximum and recolonised others. There was some sharing of haplotypes between populations of the Otway Ranges and north-western Tasmania, suggesting this was the most likely area for gene flow between the mainland and Tasmania in the past. Further analysis of the same chloroplast genetic markers by researchers at The Australian National University suggests that there is more natural haplotype diversity in the Central Highlands of Victoria than previously observed. More recently, next-generation sequencing of nuclear DNA identified very little population genetic structure throughout the range of the species, with a considerable proportion of the entire species genetic variation found within any given population of mountain ash. This suggests that gene flow is likely to be occurring over long distances, and that the lengthy generation times of the species has precluded the development of substantial genetic differentiation between Tasmania and the mainland. Further comparison of chloroplast and nuclear DNA markers confirmed the expectation of extensive pollen dispersal but limited seed dispersal, leading to patterns of strong differentiation in chloroplast markers and weak differentiation at nuclear markers.

Genome-wide sequencing of numerous mountain ash populations suggests that hybridisation with messmate (Eucalyptus obliqua) occurs frequently, with all populations currently studied having at least one hybrid individual present. In many cases these hybrids show no obvious morphological signs of hybridisation, although some individuals do show intermediate phenotypes in characteristics such as the oil gland density in leaves and the structure and height of rough bark on the trunk. Morphology is generally now considered to be a poor method of identifying hybrid individuals as it does not always accurately reflect the genetic makeup of an individual. A good example of this is a population of purported mountain ash on Wilson's Promontory in Victoria, which are morphologically more similar to mountain ash but genetically much more closely related to messmate. Other populations with high levels of hybridisation include those on Bruny Island and the Tasman Peninsula in Tasmania. It is not surprising that the populations with the highest level of hybridisation occur on islands, promontories and peninsulas, as these areas are likely to occur on the edge of the ecological niche of mountain ash, and the small patches of mountain ash still remaining at these sites are probably experiencing pollen swamping from the more dominant messmate trees. Hybrids between mountain ash and red stringybark (Eucalyptus macrorhyncha) have been observed in the Cathedral Range in Victoria. These trees resemble mountain ash in appearance though they lack the paired inflorescences, and have the oil composition of red stringybark.

== Distribution and habitat ==
Eucalyptus regnans occurs across a 700 km by 500 km region in the southern Australian states of Victoria and Tasmania. The species grows mostly in cool, mountainous areas that receive rainfall over 1,000 millimetres (39 in) per year. E. regnans reaches its highest elevations of about 1,100 metres (3,600 ft) ASL on the Errinundra Plateau in north-eastern Victoria, and its lowest elevations near sea-level in some southern parts of its Tasmanian distribution.

In Victoria, stands of tall trees are found in the Otway, Dandenong, Yarra and Strzelecki ranges as well as Mount Disappointment and East Gippsland. However, the distribution is much reduced. Most of the E. regnans forest across Gippsland was cleared for farmland between 1860 and 1880, and in the Otway Ranges between 1880 and 1900, while severe bushfires hit in 1851, 1898 and 1939. In Tasmania, E. regnans is found in the Huon and Derwent River valleys in the southeast of the state.

In the Otways, the species is found in wet forest in pure stands or growing in association with mountain grey gum (Eucalyptus cypellocarpa), messmate (E. obliqua) and Victorian blue gum (E. globulus subsp. bicostata). Other trees it grows with include manna gum (Eucalyptus viminalis), shining gum (E. nitens), myrtle beech (Nothofagus cunninghamii) and silver wattle (Acacia dealbata) The mountain ash-dominated forest can be interspersed with rainforest understory, with such species as southern sassafras (Atherosperma moschatum), celery-top pine (Phyllocladus aspleniifolius), leatherwood (Eucryphia lucida) and horizontal (Anodopetalum biglandulosum). The mountain ash is most suited to deep friable clay loam soils, often of volcanic origin; in areas of poorer soils, it can be confined to watercourses and valleys.

== Ecology ==
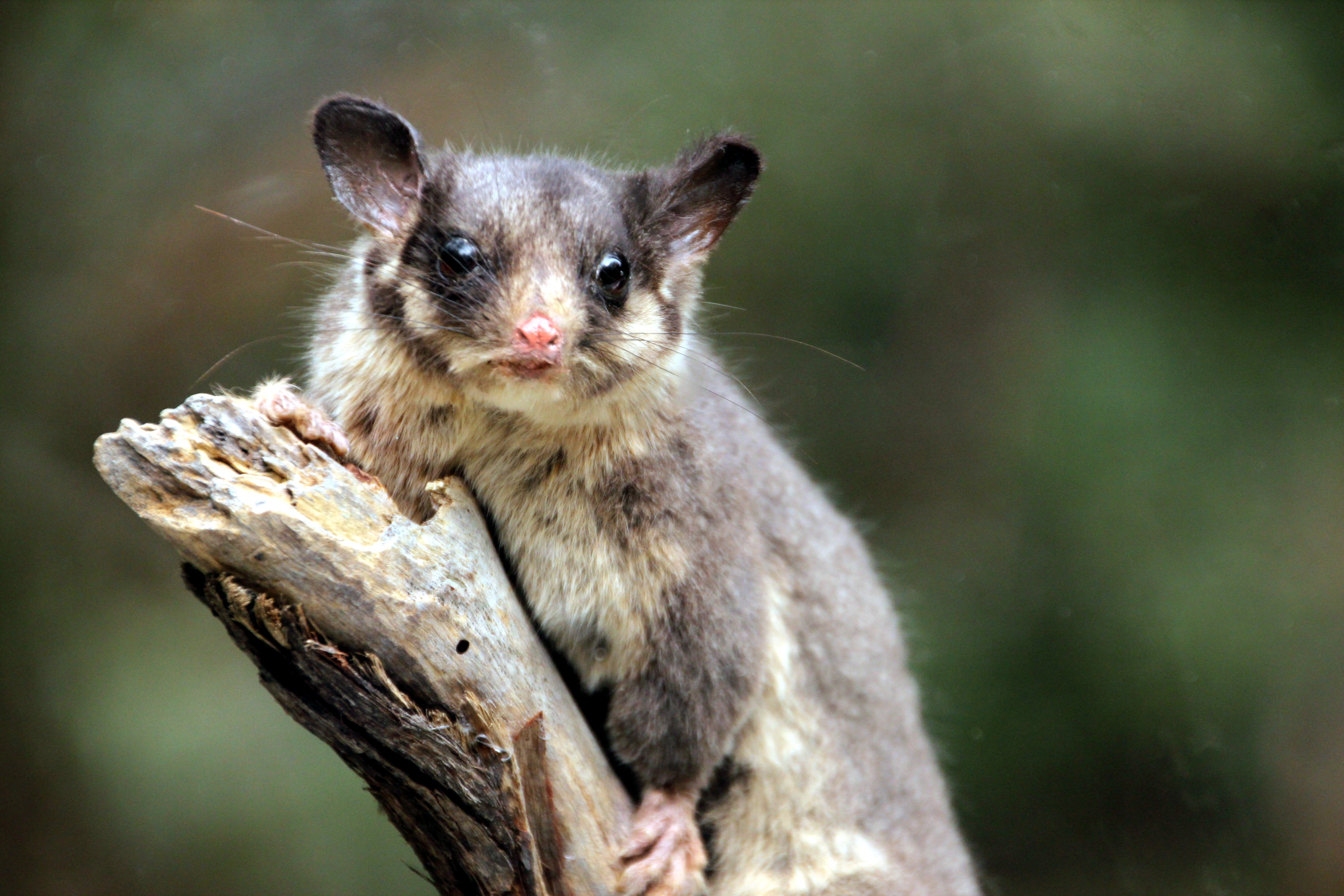
A taxidermied male Leadbeater's possum

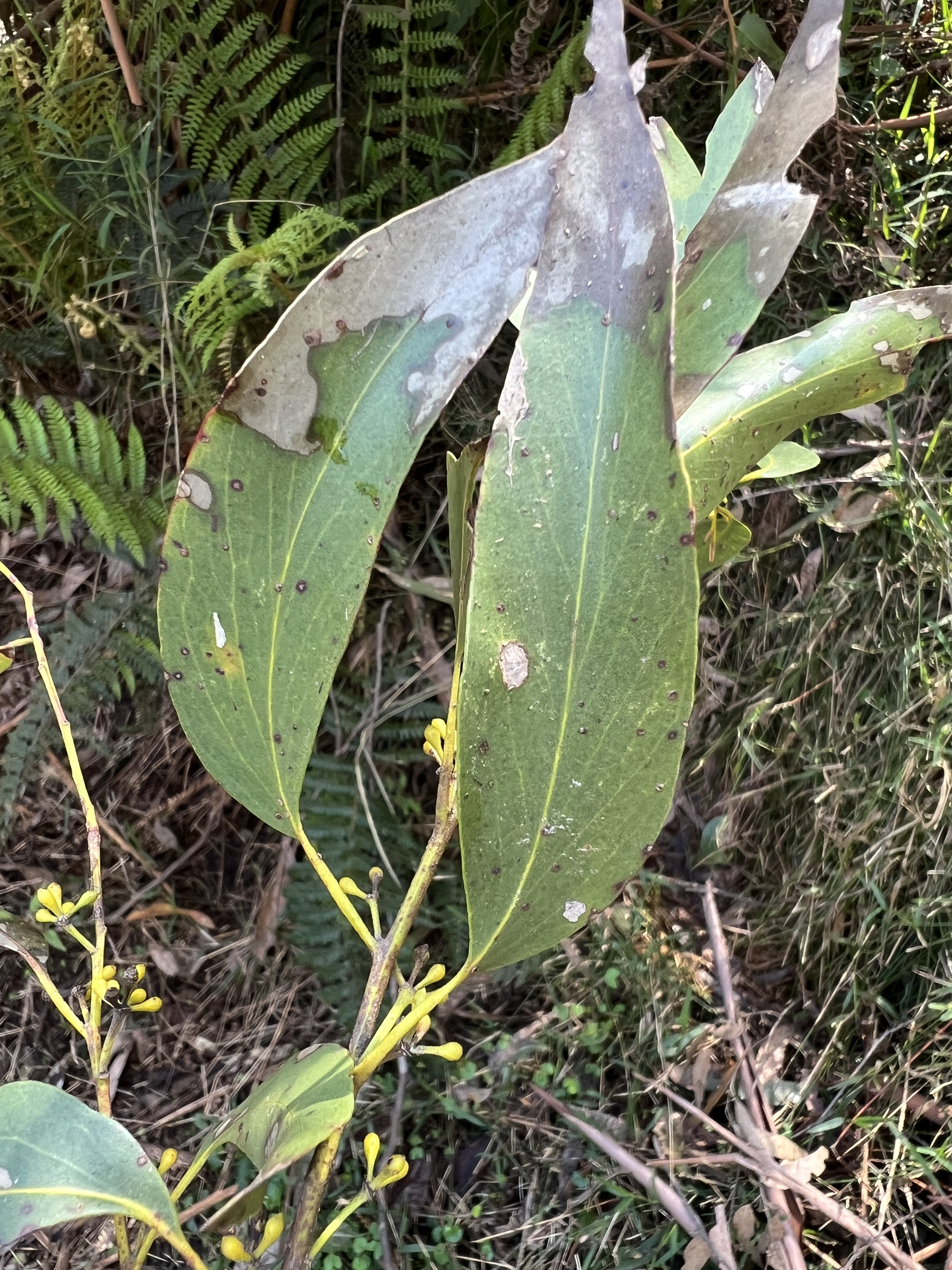
Foliage

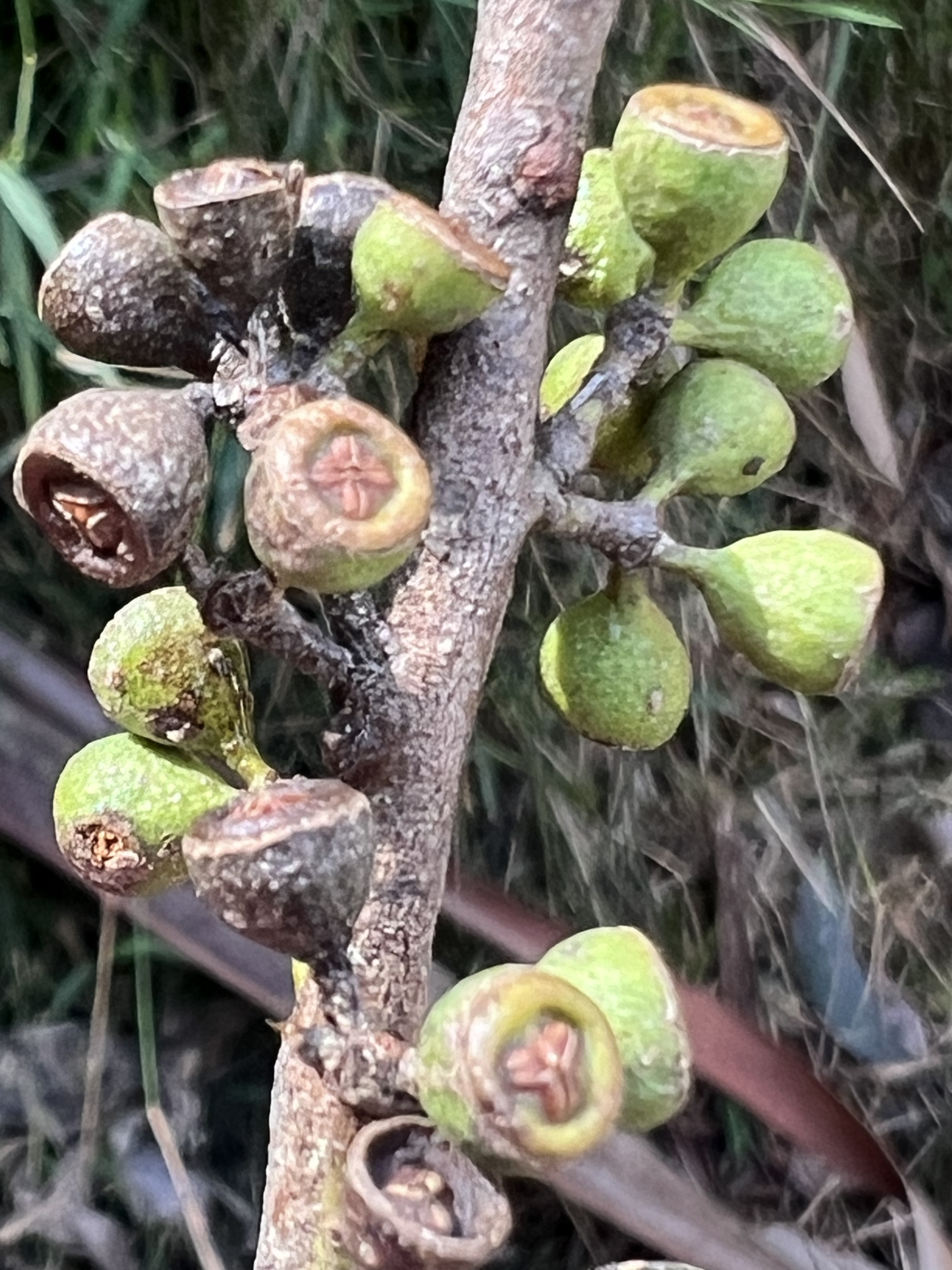
Fruit

=== Tree growth and stand development ===
Eucalyptus regnans is a very fast growing tree, with mean height growth rates in young (< 22 years old) stands ranging from 1 metre (3 ft 3 in) to 2 metres (6 ft 7 in) per year. In fact, some individuals grow at more than 2 metres (6 ft 7 in) per year for the first 20 years of their lives. However, growth rates slow with age, and eventually turn negative as old trees senesce and the tops of the canopy are damaged in high winds, lightning strikes or during fires. Mean tree height after 8 years is about 15 m, and after 22 years is about 33 m. After 50 years, trees are typically about 65 metres (213 ft) tall. In young stands (< 22 years old), mean stem diameter growth is approximately 0.8 to 2 cm per year, with half of the total stem diameter growth occurring in the first 90 years of life.

A number of environmental factors influence the growth and maturation of E. regnans, with research showing that the amount of incident solar radiation is positively associated with height and stem diameter growth, and that the amount of sunlight received is strongly negatively correlated with the level of precipitation (although all areas studied still received more than 120 centimetres (47 in) of rainfall).

In the absence of disturbance events such as high-intensity fire, individual trees can survive for hundreds of years, with the oldest known individuals identified as being 500 years old. Historically, low-frequency and high-intensity wildfires (ignited by lightning strikes) would prevent many stands from reaching this age, with fires killing mature overstorey trees and a new cohort developing from canopy-stored seedbanks. Despite this, natural variation in the spatial scale and frequency of wildfires meant that 30-60% of pre-European E. regnans forests would have been considered old growth (e.g. with living trees more than 120 years old). In addition, studies of older E. regnans forests have shown that low-intensity fires lead to the development of younger cohorts of trees without killing the parent trees, which leads to the presence of multiple age classes in old-growth forests.

As E. regnans forests mature, they start to develop characteristics that are representative of old-growth stands, such as large hollows, long strips of decorticating bark, an abundance of tree ferns and rainforest trees, buttressing at the base of E. regnans trunks, large clumps of mistletoe in the canopy, large fallen logs, and thick mats of moisture-retaining mosses.

=== Seed production, fire and regeneration ===
Eucalyptus regnans lacks a lignotuber and hence cannot recover by reshooting after intense fire. Instead, it can only regenerate by seed, and is thus termed an obligate seeder. The seeds are held firmly in woody capsules (gumnuts) until the branchlets die and the capsules dry out. Seedlings require a high level of light, much more than reaches the forest floor when there is a well-developed understorey, and so seeds are not likely to germinate or develop into saplings unless the understorey is opened up to allow light to reach the ground. As high-intensity fires tend to kill all parent trees, after fire there is a massive release of seed from drying capsules, which take advantage of the available light and the nutrients in the ash bed. Seedling densities of up to 2,500,000 per hectare (1,000,000/acre) have been recorded after a major fire. Through time there is a strong stand thinning effect and natural stem density reduction eventually leads to mature tree densities of about 30 to 40 per hectare (12 to 16/acre).

There is substantial variation in the age at which individual trees develop viable seeds, which is largely the result of growth rates, tree size, incident solar radiation, and topographic aspect. Trees as young as 7 years old may contain mature fruit capsules, although this is unusual and most trees probably start producing seeds after 11 years of age. Similarly, there is considerable variation in the rate at which stands of E. regnans develop seed crops. Tree growth rates, stand age, and topography influence the rate of development of seed crops in stands, leading to strong variation in the timing of seed crop viability, however, the mean age of reproductive viability appears to be about 21 years.

As E. regnans seeds are not stored in soil seedbanks, the regeneration of the forest depends on the presence of canopy-stored seed crops. With two or more frequent fires occurring in less than the time to stand reproductive viability, E. regnans can become locally extinct due to poor regeneration. As E. regnans is often the sole or dominant overstorey tree in many locations, this can lead to the replacement of a tall wet open forest ecosystem with a dense low wattle shrubland, which obviously has large repercussions for community composition and function. Conversely, in the complete absence of fire (for hundreds of years), the cool temperate rainforest species that live in association with E. regnans may gradually replace it in gullies or other areas where the trees succumb to age rather than fire. Thus it is clear that E. regnans forests rely on a particular frequency and intensity of fires for maintenance of the ecosystem attributes. As contemporary fire regimes have been highly modified since European occupation of Australia, there is a clear risk to E. regnans forests in many regions.

=== Ecological community ===
The majority of the endangered Leadbeater's possum population lives in mountain ash forests (Eucalyptus regnans, E. delegatensis and E. nitens) in the Central Highlands of Victoria. The possums use hollows in old trees for nesting and shelter and forage for arboreal arthropods under bark. The vegetation structure of these forests enables the possums to travel through them. Both Leadbeaters possums and yellow-bellied gliders feed on the sap from the trunks and branches. Koalas feed on the foliage, though it is not one of their preferred forage species.

Yellow-tailed black-cockatoos nest in the hollows of old trees, in contrast to the Tasmanian wedge-tailed eagle (Aquila audax fleayi) that builds its nest of large sticks at the top of the trees.

In a small area of rainforest in Yarra Ranges National Park in Victoria, nine epiphyte species were observed growing on Eucalyptus regnans, the most prevalent of these being the liverwort Bazzania adnexa.

The spur-legged phasmid (Didymuria violescens) is a leaf-eating insect that can defoliate trees during major infestations such as one experienced at Powelltown in the early 1960s. Leaves and buds are eaten by the larvae and adults of the chrysomelid leaf beetle Chrysophtharta bimaculata. Stressed trees can be damaged by the eucalyptus longhorned borer (Phoracantha semipunctata), which burrows into the trunk, which exudes a red stain. Eucalypt weevils of the genus Gonipterus commonly damage E. regnans, while the tortoise beetle (Paropsis atomaria) is a common pest of plantations.

=== Carbon storage ===
A study carried out by environmental scientist Professor Brendan Mackey of the Australian National University in 2009 identified that mountain ash forests in Victoria's Central Highlands are the best in the world at locking up carbon. Mackey and colleagues found the highest amount of carbon was contained in a forest located in the O'Shannassy River catchment, which held 1,867 tonnes per hectare (743.62 long ton/acre; 832.85 short ton/acre) of carbon. This area was a stand of unlogged mountain ash over 100 years old, which had had minimal human disturbance. They further calculated that a E. regnans-dominated forest with trees up to 250 years old and a well-established mid-storey and upper storey could store up to 2,844 tonnes per hectare (1,132.75 long ton/acre; 1,268.68 short ton/acre) of carbon.

=== Tallest specimens ===
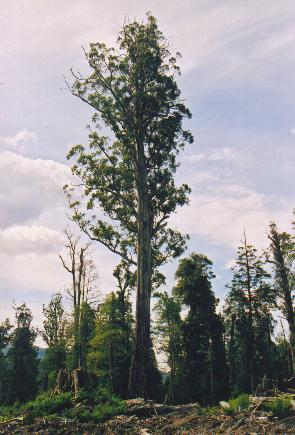
El Grande in Tasmania's Styx Valley

Eucalyptus regnans is the tallest of all flowering plants, and possibly the tallest of all plants, although no living specimens can make that claim. The tallest measured living specimen, named Centurion, stands 100.5 metres (330 feet) tall in Tasmania. Before the discovery of Centurion, the tallest known specimen was Icarus Dream, which was rediscovered in Tasmania in January, 2005 and is 97 metres (318 ft) high. It was first measured by surveyors at 98.8 metres (324 ft) in 1962 but the documentation had been lost. A total of 16 living trees in Tasmania have been reliably measured in excess of 90 metres (300 ft). The Cumberland Scenic Reserve near Cambarville, became the site of Victoria's tallest trees, in 1939, including one measured at 92 metres (302 ft) high, following the extensive Black Friday bushfires. A severe storm in 1959 blew down 13 of the trees and the tallest tree was reduced to a height of 84 metres (276 ft) after it lost part of its crown. The height of this tree was cited as 81.5 metres (267 ft) in 2002 following further storm damage in 1973. In 2000, a tree at Wallaby Catchment in Kinglake National Park was discovered to be 91.6 metres (301 ft) tall in 2000, however it perished in the Black Saturday bushfires of 2009.

Historically, the tallest individual is claimed to be the Ferguson Tree, at 132.6 metres (435 ft), found in the Watts River region of Victoria in 1871 or 1872. This record is often disputed as unreliable, despite first-hand documentary evidence of it being measured on the ground with surveyor's tape by a senior forestry official (see below). Widespread agreement exists, however, that an exceptionally tall individual was reliably measured at 112.8 metres (370 ft) by theodolite in 1880 by a surveyor, George Cornthwaite, at Thorpdale, Victoria (the tree is known both as the Cornthwaite or Thorpdale Tree). When it was felled in 1881, Cornthwaite remeasured it on the ground by chain at 114.3 metres (375 ft). The stump is commemorated with a plaque. That tree was about 1 metre (3.3 ft) shorter than Hyperion, the world's current tallest living tree, a coast redwood measuring 115.5 metres (379.1 ft).

Some individuals attain much greater diameter; the largest known being "the Bulga Stump", a charred remnant near Tarra Bulga, South Gippsland district, Victoria, which as a living tree had a DBH of 10.77 metres (35 ft 4 in), making E. regnans the third thickest species of tree after the baobab (Adansonia digitata) and the Montezuma cypress (Taxodium mucronatum). As a consequence of being both the tallest and thickest Australian trees, E. regnans is also the most massive; that title being currently held by an individual called the "Kermandie Queen" discovered 3.9 kilometres (2.4 mi) west of Geeveston, Tasmania, which measures 76.99 metres (252 ft 7 in) in height and has a diameter at breast height (DBH) of 6.88 metres (22 ft 7 in).

Al Carder notes that in 1888 a cash reward of £100 was offered there for the discovery of any tree measuring more than 400 feet (120 m). The fact that such a considerable reward was never claimed is taken as evidence that such large trees did not exist. Carder's historical research, however, revealed that the reward was offered under conditions that made it highly unlikely to be collected. First, it was made in the depths of winter and applied only for a very short time. Next, the tree had to be measured by an accredited surveyor. Since loggers had already taken the largest trees from the most accessible Victorian forests, finding very tall trees then would have demanded an arduous trek into remote wilderness and at considerable altitude. In turn, that meant that searchers also needed the services of experienced bushmen to be able to guide them and conduct an effective search. Only one expedition actually penetrated one of the strongholds of E. regnans at Mount Baw Baw but its search was rendered ineffectual by cold and snow and managed to measure only a single living tree – the New Turkey Tree: 99.4 metres (326 ft) – before appalling conditions forced a retreat, Carder notes.

Ferdinand von Mueller claimed to have personally measured one tree near the headwaters of the Yarra River at 122 metres (400 ft). Nurseryman David Boyle, claimed in 1862 to have measured a fallen tree in a deep gully in the Dandenongs at 119.5 metres (392 ft), and with a diameter at its broken tip that indicated it might have lost another eight metres (26 ft) of trunk when it broke, for 128 metres (420 ft).

Von Mueller's early records also mention two trees on the nearby Black Spur Range, one alive and measuring 128 metres (420 ft) and another fallen tree said to measure 146 metres (479 ft), but these were either based on hearsay or uncertain reliability. David Boyle also reported that a tree at Cape Otway measured 158 metres (518 ft), but this too was based on hearsay. Some claims and some reports about these tree specimen 200 metres (660 ft), or even 250 metres (820 ft), or even as much as 300 metres (980 ft) tall are also claimed and reported, but these claims and these reports are too based about hearsay also.

None, however, had been verified by direct documentation until 1982 when Ken Simpendorfer, a Special Projects Officer for the Forests Commission Victoria, directed a search of official Victorian archives. It unearthed a forgotten report from more than a century earlier, one that had not been referred to in other accounts of the species up to that time. It was written on 21 February 1872, by the Inspector of State Forests, William Ferguson, and was addressed to the Assistant Commissioner of Lands and Surveys, Clement Hodgkinson. Ferguson had been instructed to explore and inspect the watershed of the Watts River and reported trees in great number and exceptional size in areas where loggers had not yet reached. Ferguson wrote a letter to the editor in the Melbourne Age newspaper.

"Some places, where the trees are fewer and at a lower altitude, the timber is much larger in diameter, averaging from 6 to 10 feet and frequently trees to 15 feet in diameter are met with on alluvial flats near the river. These trees average about ten per acre: their size, sometimes, is enormous. Many of the trees that have fallen by decay and by bush fires measure 350 feet in length, with girth in proportion. In one instance I measured with the tape line one huge specimen that lay prostrate across a tributary of the Watts and found it to be 435 feet from the roots to the top of its trunk. At 5 feet from the ground it measures 18 feet in diameter. At the extreme end where it has broken in its fall, it (the trunk) is 3 feet in diameter. This tree has been much burnt by fire, and I fully believe that before it fell it must have been more than 500 feet high. As it now lies it forms a complete bridge across a narrow ravine" – William Ferguson, The Melbourne Age, 22 February 1872.

It is also possible that individual trees will again attain such heights. Author Bob Beale has recorded that the tallest trees in the Black Spur Range now measure about 85 metres (279 ft) but – due to major bushfires in the 1920s and 1930s – are less than 80 years old and have been growing consistently at the rate of about 1 metre (3.3 ft) a year.

=== In New Zealand ===
A Eucalyptus regnans stand in the Orokonui Ecosanctuary near Dunedin, New Zealand, where E. regnans is an introduced species, contains that country's tallest measured tree, standing 80.5 metres (264 ft) high in 2012. A Eucalyptus regnans in the urban area of Greytown was measured at 32.8 metres (108 ft) in 2011.

== Uses ==
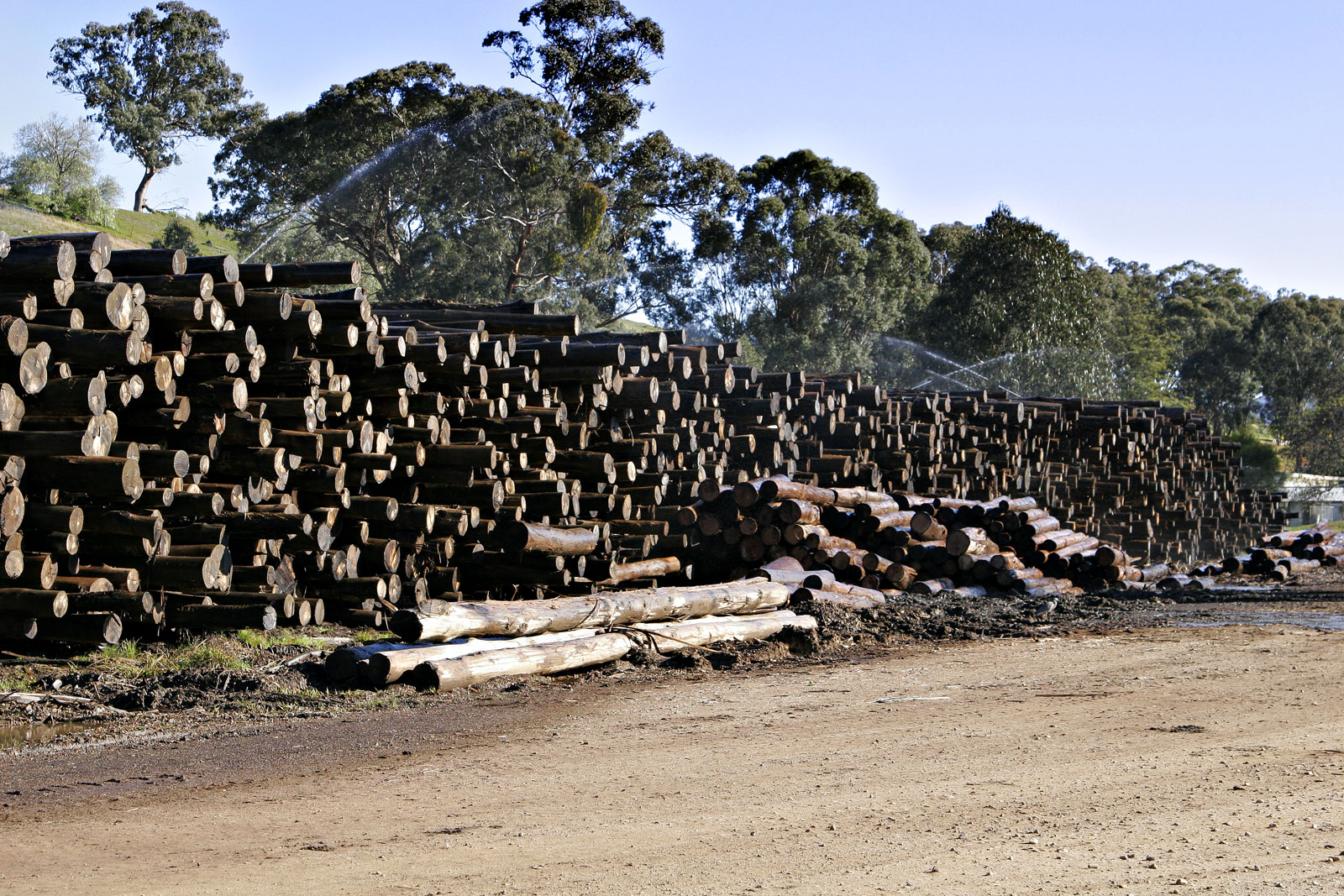
Eucalyptus regnans logs at a woodmill

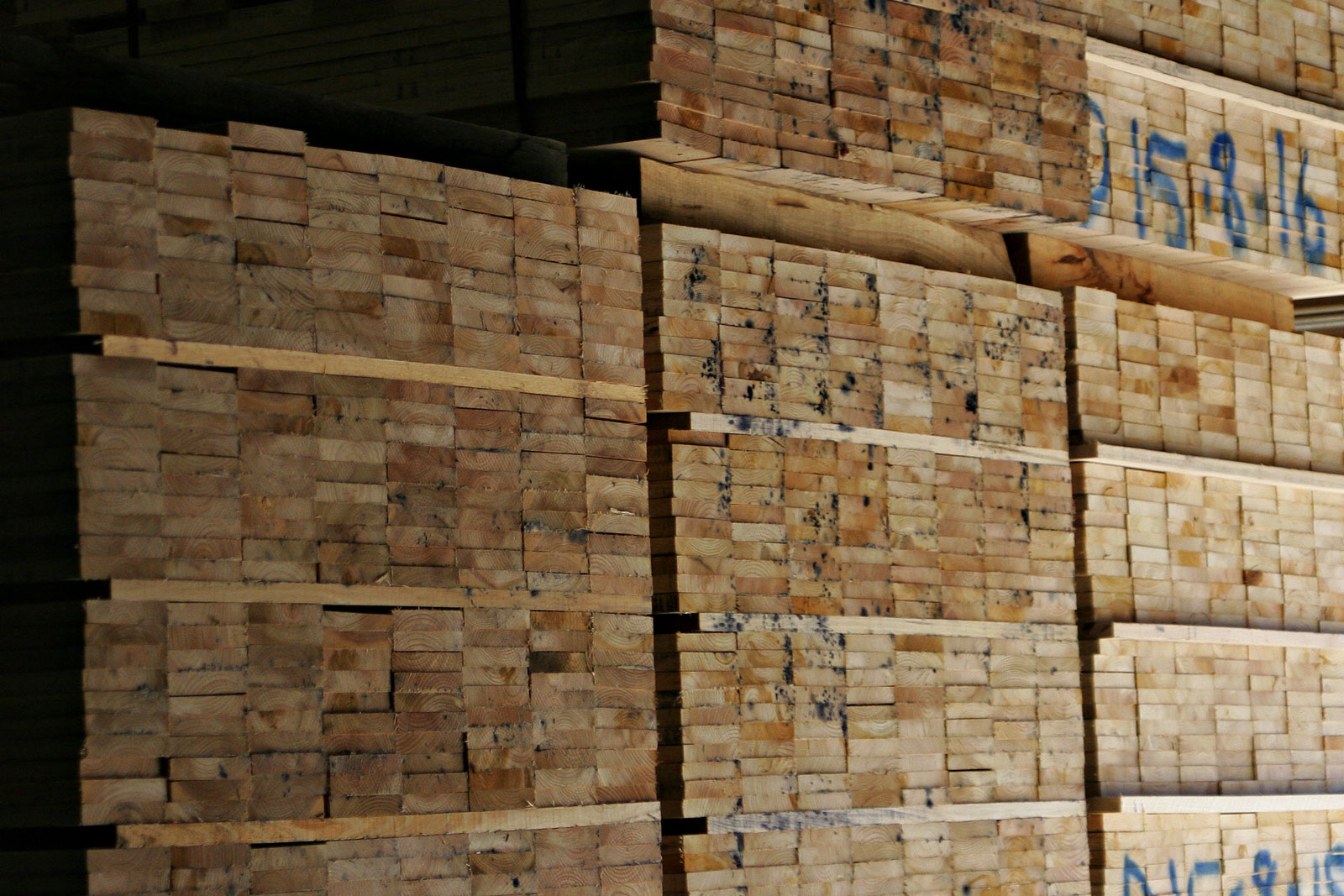
Timber from Victorian mountain ash

Mountain ash flooring, showing gum vein, fiddleback figure, typical blonde colour

Eucalyptus regnans is valued for its timber, and has been harvested in very large quantities. Aside from being logged in its natural range, it is grown in plantations in New Zealand and Chile, and to a limited extent, in South Africa and Zimbabwe. Primary uses are sawlogging and woodchipping. It was a major source of newsprint in the 20th century. Much of the present woodchip harvest is exported to Japan. While the area of natural stands with large old trees is rapidly decreasing, substantial areas of regrowth exist and it is increasingly grown in plantations, the long, straight, fast growing trunks being much more commercially valuable than the old growth timber.

It is a medium weight timber (about 680 kg/m^{3} or 1,150 lb/cu yd) and rather coarse (stringy) in texture. Gum veins are common. The wood is easy to work and the grain is straight with long, clear sections without knots. The wood works reasonably well for steam-bending. Primary uses for sawn wood are furniture, flooring (where its very pale blonde colour is highly prized), panelling, veneer, plywood, window frames, and general construction. The wood has sometimes been used for wood wool and cooperage. However, the wood needs steam reconditioning for high value applications, due to a tendency to collapse on drying. This wood is highly regarded by builders, furniture makers and architects.

Genetic comparison of logged stands and natural stands of mountain ash showed only minor differences in nuclear DNA between the two, with slightly stronger spatial genetic structure in the undisturbed treatment, higher levels of genetic differentiation in the logged treatment, and greater partitioning of genetic diversity among logged sites. However, analysis of chloroplast DNA showed more substantial differences, with higher levels of diversity in logged sites than burnt or undisturbed sites suggesting that chloroplast DNA was entering the system via the use of non-local seed in the regeneration process.

== Conservation ==
E. regnans forests are particularly susceptible to destruction by bushfire, and, to a lesser extent, timber harvesting.

Opposition to logging of wet forests by clearfelling has grown very strong in recent years (particularly opposition to woodchipping). It is a controversial debate with strong opinions both for and against timber harvesting.

Several applications have been made to Victoria's Flora and Fauna Guarantee (FFG) Scientific Advisory Committee to list mountain ash forests as an endangered vegetation community. The committee rejected an application in 2017 as being ineligible and that it did not satisfy at least one criterion set out in the Flora and Fauna Guarantee Act 1988 and its Regulations of 2011. The assessment criteria included, was there a demonstrated state of decline, has there been a reduction in distribution or has vegetation community altered markedly.

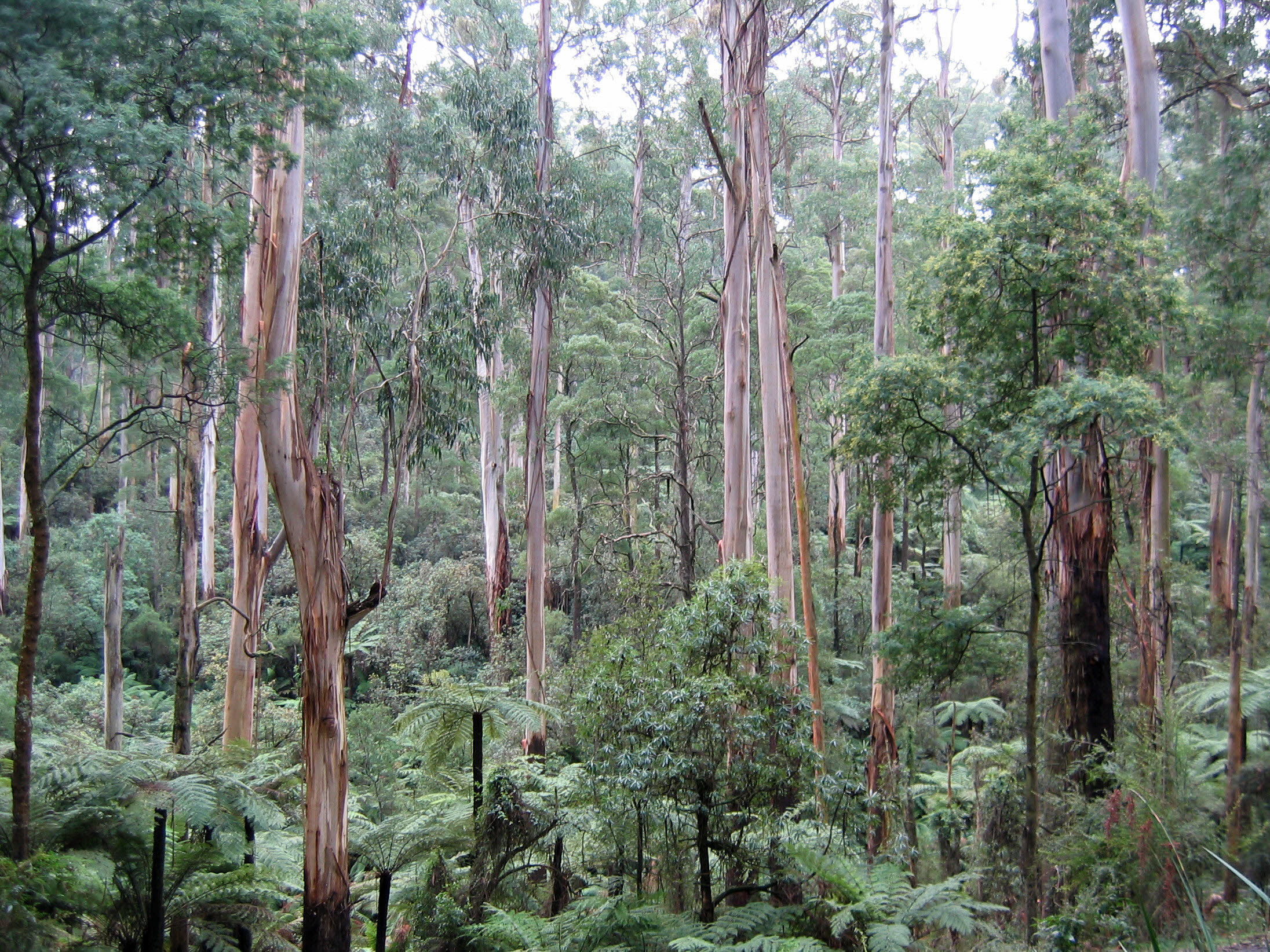
Sherbrooke Forest, Victoria

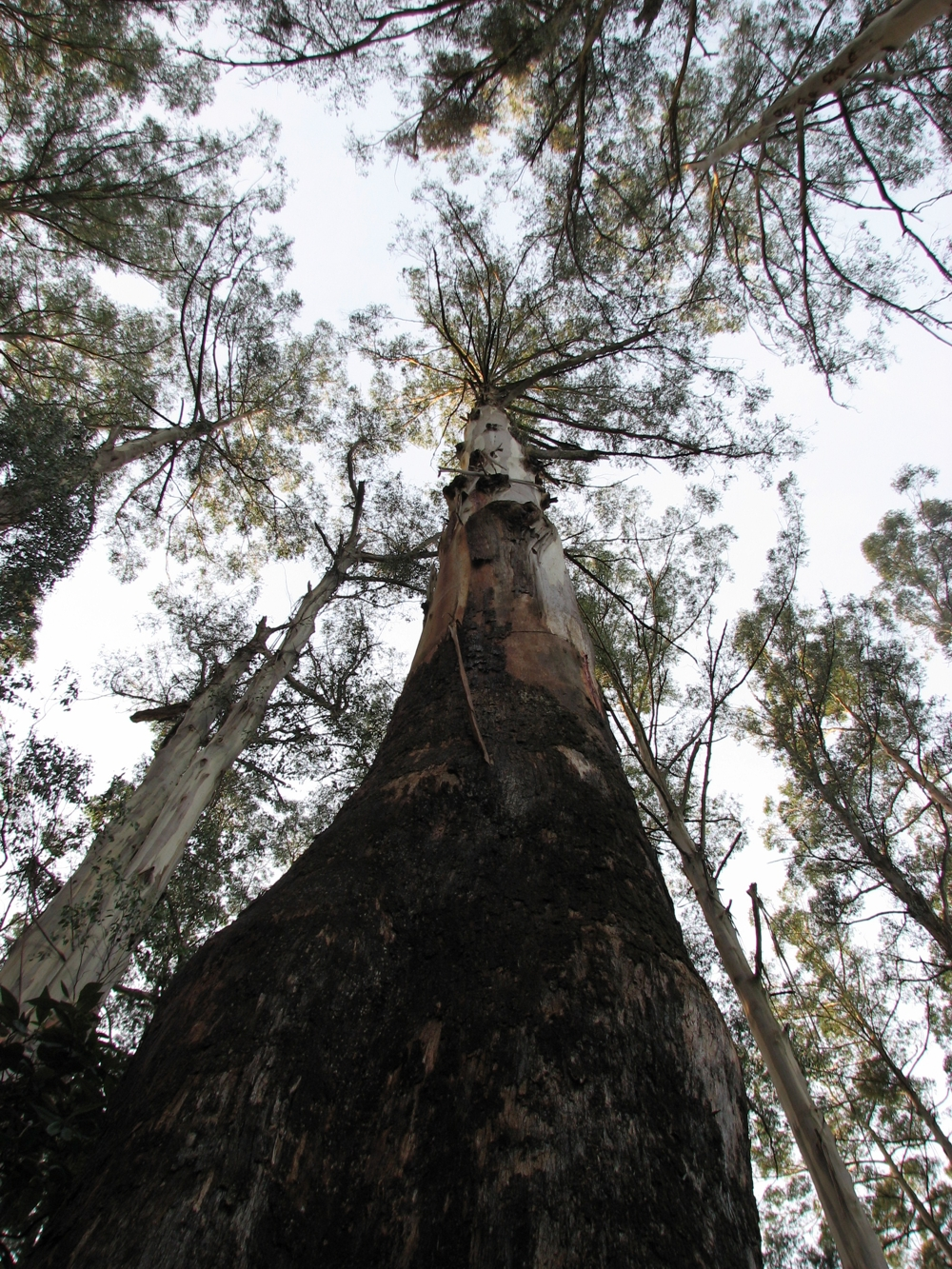
Eucalyptus regnans, Sherbrooke Forest

Studies conducted by Murray Cunningham and David Ashton found that the re-growth habit of Eucalyptus regnans requires high light conditions, and the high nutrients contained in the ash layer. These conditions are found typically following a high intensity wildfire, which are an infrequent, yet periodic feature of mountain ash forests. For this reason clearfelling – with the complete removal of all trees, followed by a high intensity fire and seeding – is used by the timber industry and forest scientists to ensure regeneration of harvested areas because it mimics the conditions found after high intensity wildfire.

Melbourne's forested water catchment areas, which provides water requiring little treatment, are composed of large areas E. regnans forest. The management of 157,000 hectares of Melbourne's forested water catchments were vested in the Melbourne and Metropolitan Board of Works (MMBW) in 1891 with a closed catchment policy where timber harvesting and public access was not permitted. These areas are now included in the Yarra Ranges National Park. There has been a long running political campaign to add more areas to create the Great Forest National Park.

Water yields from catchments fall significantly for 20 to 40 years if trees are killed by bushfire or timber harvesting. The MMBW began research into forest cover on water supplies as early as 1948. In the early 1960s they set up a new series of paired catchment experiments in wet mountain forests near Healesville to measure the long term impacts of timber harvesting and bushfire on water quality and quantity. It took another 10 years for the results to emerge more clearly. It was found that while timber harvesting had an impact, the most dramatic threat to stream flows remained catastrophic bushfires like those on Black Friday in 1939 or Black Saturday in 2009.

In 2018, some researchers concluded that Mountain Ash forests in Victoria represent collapsing ecosystems. They coined the term 'hidden collapse' meaning an ecosystem that gives a superficial appearance of being intact but has lost key elements. At their research sites they found that between 1997 and 2011, up to 50% of large old-cavity trees (trees with big holes that serve as nest sites for animals and birds) had been lost and there had also been a significant decline in the numbers of birds and tree dwelling marsupials such as possums and gliders. They identified fast and slow drivers of change: fire, logging, and climate change, and indicated that Mountain Ash forests would be replaced with Acacia-dominated woodlands.

Logging Eucalyptus regnans in Tasmania

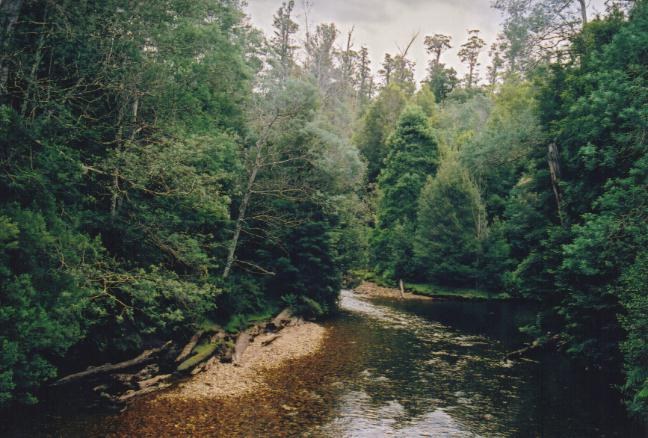
The Styx River in Tasmania runs through a forest of Eucalyptus regnans, myrtle beech and tree ferns. The mountain ash rise high above the forest.

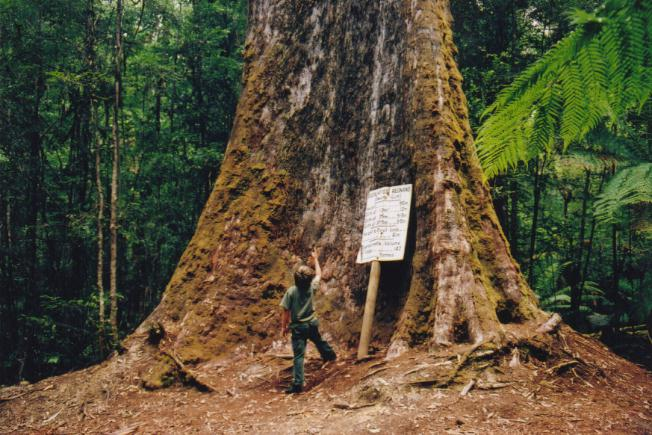
"The Big Tree" (previously thought to be the tallest remaining), is about 15 metres (49 ft) around the base. The sign at its base states its dimensions and the tonnage of timber that could potentially be cut from it. A few such trees of extreme size have been recorded by Forestry Tasmania as worthy of preservation.

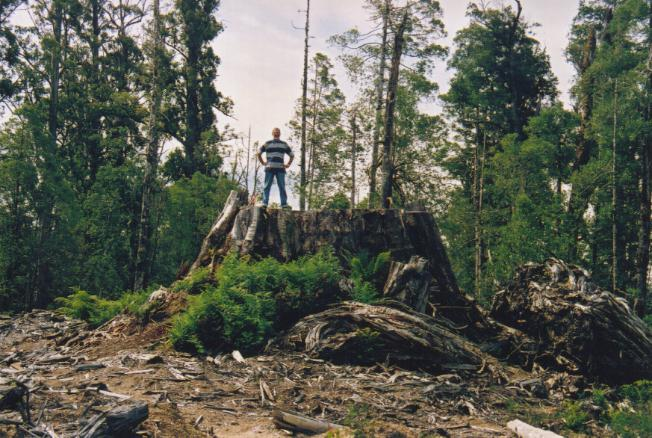
The stump of one of the largest Eucalyptus regnans to be logged in Tasmania. The man is 1.86 m (6 ft 1 in).

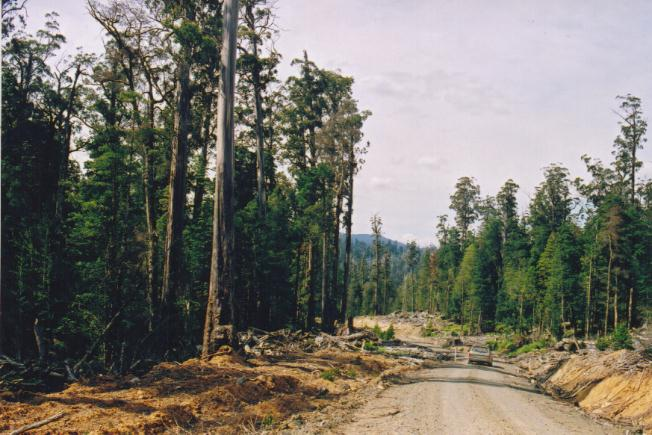
A very tall mountain ash by a logging road. Trees that have been identified as above the permissible height for logging are left isolated when the forest around them is logged. If reduced in height by storm, the tree becomes loggable.

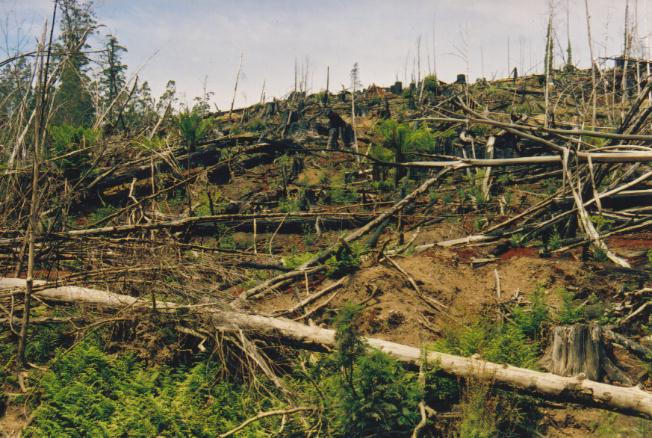
Clearfelled old-growth forest of Eucalyptus regnans near the Styx Valley in southern Tasmania, prior to bull-dozing and burning.

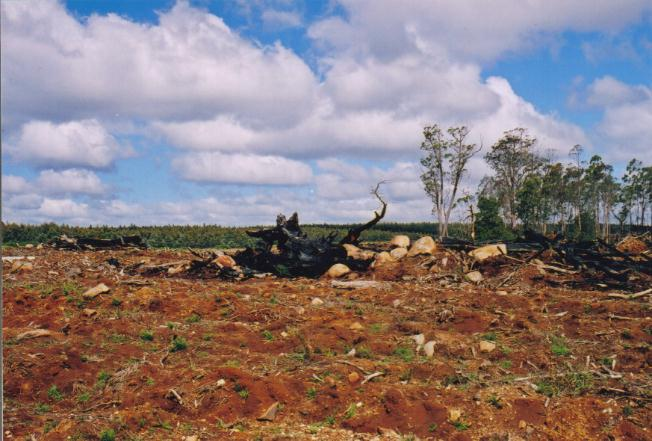
Eucalyptus regnans forest replaced by Pinus radiata plantation

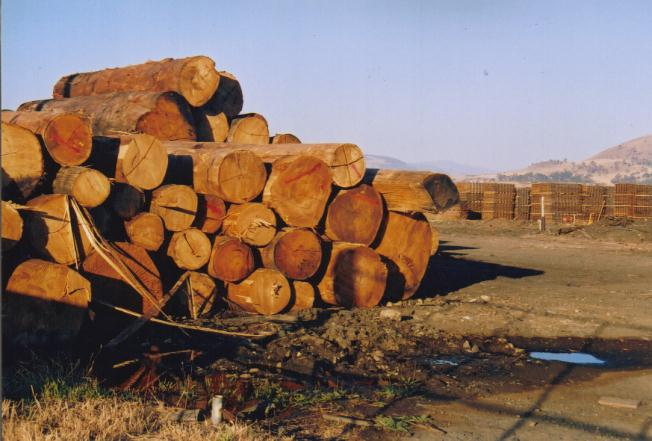
Mountain ash logs. Older trees are often hollow and are only suitable for woodchip.

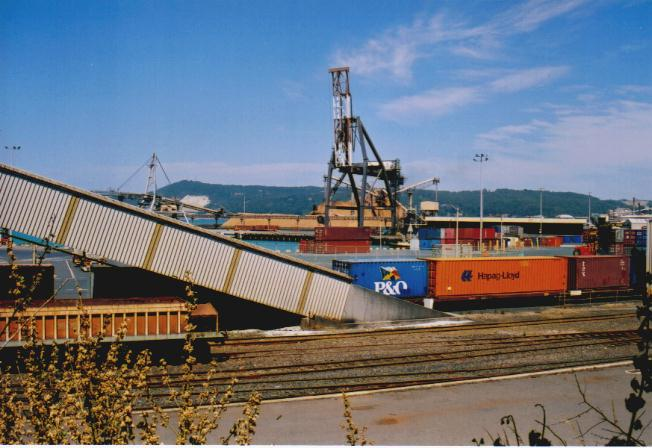
High grade woodchip for the papermills of Japan being exported from Burnie in 2001

== Use in horticulture ==
Eucalyptus regnans is too large for the majority of gardens, but may be suitable for parks. Propagation is from seed, with the best germination rates being obtained by refrigerating for three weeks before sowing. Seed may be stored for several years if refrigerated and kept dry. Seedlings are grown in containers but are more prone to damping off than other eucalypts; they are highly susceptible to Phytophthora cinnamomi and P. nicotianae. Young plants are generally planted out once they are 8 or 9 months old. These are at risk of being eaten by grazing rabbits, wallabies and possums, which can destroy young plantations in severe cases.

American horticulturist and entrepreneur Ellwood Cooper noted its rapid growth but demanding soil requirements in his 1876 work Forest Culture and Eucalyptus Trees. Eucalyptus regnans requires fertile soil with good drainage and annual rainfall of 1,000 millimetres (39 in) spread over the year, and has poor tolerance to temperatures below −7 °C (19 °F) or drought.

Outside Australia, plantations have been successfully established in New Zealand, South Africa, Kenya, and Tanzania.

== See also ==
- For other trees named mountain ash, see Mountain ash
- The world´s tallest tree species
