= Triarius (tree) =

Tree in Tasmania, Australia

Coordinates: 43.07725°S 146.76871°E

The Triarius, a tree, is a very large Eucalyptus regnans that is located in southern Tasmania, Australia. In 2010 the tree was estimated to be 86.5 metres (284 ft) tall, its diameter was 3.9 metres (13 ft), and the volume of the trunk was 219 cubic metres (7,700 cu ft).

The tree was discovered in August 2008 by employees of Forestry Tasmania while analysing the data collected by LiDAR system used in mapping and assessment of state forest resources. The tree was discovered located in secondary forest and survived logging and forest fires by a lucky coincidence. Next to the Triarius, south-east from it there grows the highest known eucalypt in the world - the 100.5-metre (330 ft) tall E. regnans named Centurion.

In 2019 Triarius suffered major fire damage in the January 2019 bush fires. While not reduced in height many of the branches and leaves dropped off and its survival was uncertain months later.
