= Derwent Valley Football Association =

Australian rules football league

- Most recent season or competition: 1954
- Sport: Australian rules football
- Founded: 1904
- First season: 1904
- Folded: 1954
- No. of teams: 4 (1954), 18 (historical)
- Country: Australia
- Last champion: Hamilton (1954)
- Most titles: Hamilton, Upper Derwent (3)
- Related competitions: Tyenna FA

The Derwent Valley Football Association was a minor Australian rules football competition based in the Derwent Valley of southern Tasmania.

== History ==
The first incarnation of the Derwent Valley Football Association was formed in 1904, when New Norfolk, Railway and Upper Derwent established an association to allow for regular competition. Upper Derwent won the first premiership, however the deciding game against Railway was marred by poor behaviour from both teams and a lack of respect towards the umpires show by Railway.

The DVFA appears to have lapsed after its initial season, and the competition would not reappear until 1920 when New Norfolk, Upper Derwent, Molesworth and Plenty re-established it. This era of the competition featured a constantly changing line-up of clubs. Upper Derwent left after 1920 and the 1922 season saw Plenty and New Norfolk replaced by Lachlan and New Norfolk's B grade side. The DVFA did not form in 1923 but returned in 1924 with Westerway, Plenty and Upper Derwent competing. After this season the competition lapsed again and would not return for a decade.

1934 saw the DVFA re-formed as basically a continuation of the Lower Derwent Football Association. LDFA clubs Lachlan, Molesworth and Lower Derwent were joined by Upper Derwent. Rosegarland played in 1936 and 1937, while Plenty played in 1935 and 1938. 1937 saw Bothwell and Ouse join the competition, which was re-named the Southern Country Football Association, although this name would only last one season. Molesworth, Plenty and Lachlan departed to re-form the Lower Derwent FA in 1939, which left the competition with only 3 clubs. The DVFA would go into recess after the 1940 season due to WWII.

The competition was re-formed in 1946 with Hamilton, New Norfolk Rovers, Upper Derwent and Plenty competing. The line-up of clubs changed yearly during the late 1940s, with Butlers Gorge joining and New Norfolk Rovers leaving in 1947, while ANM played one season in 1948. The biggest change occurred in 1949 when the decision was made to merge the Tyenna Football Association with the DVFA, leading to the creation of an 8-club competition. By 1952 Butlers Gorge had merged with Ouse and Westerway and Upper Derwent Juniors both departed, leaving only 5 clubs in the DVFA. The Tyenna FA was re-formed in 1952 and the departure of clubs from the DVFA to the TFA eventually saw its demise after the 1954 season, which saw Bronte Park and Ouse move to the Tyenna FA while Hamilton and Upper Derwent joined the Southern Districts FA.

== Clubs ==
=== Final ===
Club	Colours	Nickname	Home Ground	Former League	Est.	Years in DVFA	DVFA Senior Premierships		Fate
Club	Colours	Nickname	Home Ground	Former League	Est.	Years in DVFA	Total	Years	Fate
Bronte Park			Bronte Park Football Ground, Bronte Park	–	1949	1949-1954	2	1951, 1953	Joined Tyenna FA in 1955
Hamilton	(1946-?)(?-1954)	Rabbits	Hamilton Showgrounds, Hamilton	TFA	1886	1946-1954	3	1947, 1950, 1954	Joined Southern Districts FA in 1955
Ouse (Butlers Gorge-Ouse 1951-53)	(1937-40)(1951-53)(1949-50, 1954)	Magpies	Ouse Football Ground, Ouse	SCJFA, TFA	1935	1937-1940, 1949-1954	2	1937, 1939	Joined Tyenna FA in 1955
Upper Derwent	(1904)(?-1954)		Bushy Park Recreation Ground, Bushy Park	SCFA, SDFA	1904	1904, 1920, 1924, 1934-1940, 1946-1947, 1953-1954	3	1904, 1936, 1946	Played in Southern Districts FA between 1948-52, returned there in 1955

=== Former ===
Club	Colours	Nickname	Home Ground	Former League	Est.	Years in DVFA	DVFA Senior Premierships		Fate
Club	Colours	Nickname	Home Ground	Former League	Est.	Years in DVFA	Total	Years	Fate
ANM			Boyer Oval, New Norfolk	–	1947	1948	0	-	Joined Southern Districts FA in 1949
Bothwell		Rabbits	Bothwell Recreation Reserve, Bothwell	SCJFA	1880	1937-1940	2	1938, 1940	Joined Southern Districts FA in 1946
Butlers Gorge	(1947-49)(1950)		Butlers Gorge Recreation Ground, Butlers Gorge	–	1947	1947-1950	1	1949	Merged with Ouse to form Butlers Gorge-Ouse in 1951.
Lachlan	(1922)(?-1953)	Tigers	Lachlan Park Oval, New Norfolk	LDFA	1920	1922, 1934-1938, 1949-1953	2	1922, 1952	Unaffiliated between 1923-26, joined Lower Derwent FA in 1927. Returned to Lower Derwent FA in 1939. Moved to Tyenna FA in 1954.
Lower Derwent			Boyer Oval, New Norfolk	LDFA	1930	1934-1935	1	1934	Folded after 1935 season
Molesworth	(1920-22)(1934-38)		Molesworth Football Ground, Molesworth	LDFA	1920	1920-1922, 1934-1938	2	1921, 1935	Entered recess after 1922 season. Withdrew partway through 1938 season, joined Lower Derwent FA in 1939.
New Norfolk			Boyer Oval, New Norfolk	–	1878	1904, 1920-1921	1	1920	Left league after 1921 season, formed Southern Country FA in 1923
New Norfolk B			Boyer Oval, New Norfolk	–	1878	1922	0	-	1923 unknown, formed New Norfolk JFA in 1924
New Norfolk Rovers			Boyer Oval, New Norfolk	–	1940	1940, 1946	0	-	Folded after 1946 season
Plenty	(?-1938)(?-1952)		Plenty Football Ground, Plenty	LDFA	1920	1920-1921, 1924, 1934-1935, 1938, 1946-1952	1	1948	Recess in 1936-37. Withdrew partway through 1938 season, joined Lower Derwent FA in 1939. Joined Tyenna FA in 1953.
Railway			Boyer Oval, New Norfolk	–		1904	0	-	Folded
Rosegarland			Rosegarland Football Ground, Rosegarland	–	1936	1936-1937	0	-	Merged with Plenty in 1938
Upper Derwent Juniors			Bushy Park Recreation Ground, Bushy Park	TFA	1904	1949-1951	0	-	Left league
Westerway			Ellendale Football Ground, Ellendale	RFA	1920	1924, 1949-1951	1	1924	Moved to Forest Hill Cup FA in 1925. Re-joined Tyenna FA in 1952 as Ellendale.

== Premierships ==
Year	Premier	Score	Runners-up	Notes
1904	Upper Derwent		Railway	
1905-19	DVFA in recess			
1920	New Norfolk	7.5 (47) - 5.6 (36)	Molesworth	
1921	Molesworth			
1922	Lachlan		New Norfolk B	
1923	?			
1924	Westerway	6.10 (46) - 5.5 (35)	Upper Derwent	
1925-33	DVFA in recess			
1934	Lower Derwent	8.13 (61) - 3.7 (25)	Plenty	
1935	Molesworth	10.14 (74) - 6.9 (45)	Upper Derwent	
1936	Upper Derwent	6.9 (45) - 3.4 (22)	Lachlan	
1937	Ouse	15.12 (102) - 11.14 (80)	Upper Derwent	
1938	Bothwell	8.9 (57) - 6.14 (50)	Upper Derwent	
1939	Ouse	4.8 (32) - 3.8 (26)	Upper Derwent	
1940	Bothwell	12.20 (92) - 10.11 (71)	Ouse	
1941-45	DVFA in recess - WWII			
1946	Upper Derwent	9.13 (67) - 5.9 (39)	New Norfolk Rovers	
1947	Hamilton	6.8 (44) - 5.8 (38)	Upper Derwent	
1948	Plenty	7.4 (46) - 6.9 (45)	Hamilton	
1949	Butlers Gorge	18.20 (128) - 10.8 (68)	Hamilton	
1950	Hamilton	11.10 (76) - 8.6 (54)	Plenty	
1951	Bronte Park		Hamilton	
1952	Lachlan	10.8 (68) - 7.9 (51)	Hamilton	
1953	Bronte Park	9.18 (72) - 7.6 (48)	Hamilton	
1954	Hamilton	10.7 (67) - 7.9 (51)	Upper Derwent	
