= Tyenna Football Association =

Australian rules football league

- Most recent season or competition: 1958
- Sport: Australian rules football
- Founded: 1921
- First season: 1921
- Folded: 1958
- No. of teams: 4 (1958), 11 (historical)
- Country: Australia
- Last champion: Maydena (1958)
- Most titles: Westerway/Ellendale (5)
- Related competitions: Derwent Valley FA

The Tyenna Football Association was a minor Australian rules football competition based in the Derwent Valley of southern Tasmania.

== History ==
The competition began as the Russell Football Association in 1921, with competing clubs being Tyenna, Ellendale, and Westerway. The Russell FA ran until 1924, when it went into recess. The competition would be re-formed in 1925 as the Forest Hill Cup Football Association, with Fitzgerald, Upper Derwent Juniors, National Park and Westerway competing. This iteration would last until the end of the 1927 season.

The Tyenna FA name would be first adopted when the competition re-formed in 1930. After this season it entered recess again, before re-forming in 1937 with Fitzgerald, National Park and Westerway competing. The 1939 season saw an unprecedented 4 games required to decide the premier. Fitzgerald won the final against Ellendale, who as minor premier were entitled to challenge Fitzgerald to a Grand Final a week later to decide the premiership. This grand final was drawn, as was a subsequent replay. Ellendale's profligacy in front of goal saw them with a score of 1.19 at the end of the third quarter of the replay but they stormed home with 4.5 in the final quarter to tie the game and force a second replay. This subsequent game saw Ellendale edge out Fitzgerald by 1 point to finally claim the premiership. The TFA went into recess in 1941 due to WWII.

The TFA was re-formed in 1945 with Hamilton, Upper Derwent and National Park competing. Hamilton and Upper Derwent both left the Association a year later and were replaced by Ellendale, Lachlan and Upper Derwent's junior side. In 1949 it was decided to merge the TFA into the Derwent Valley FA to create a stronger association, which saw the TFA enter recess for the next 3 seasons. The formation of the Maydena club in 1952 saw the competition re-formed. The new competition began to overtake the DVFA, bringing Plenty and Lachlan over in 1953 and 1954 respectively before taking in Bronte Park and Ouse after the DVFA folded after the 1954 season. This momentum was not to last, however. Dwindling player numbers saw the competition reduced to 4 clubs by 1958. At the end of this season Plenty folded, while Ouse merged with Wayatinah and along with Maydena joined the Southern Districts Football Association.

== Clubs ==
=== Final ===
Club	Colours	Nickname	Home Ground	Former League	Est.	Years in TFA	TFA Senior Premierships		Fate
Club	Colours	Nickname	Home Ground	Former League	Est.	Years in TFA	Total	Years	Fate
Maydena		Bulldogs	Maydena Sports Ground, Maydena	–	1952	1952-1958	2	1957, 1958	Moved to Southern Districts FA in 1959
Plenty			Plenty Football Ground, Plenty	DVFA	1920	1953-1958	2	1954, 1956	Folded after 1958 season
Ouse	(1941)(1955-58)	Magpies	Ouse Football Ground, Ouse	DVFA	1935	1941, 1955-1958	0	-	Merged with Wayatinah to form Ouse-Wayatinah in Southern Districts FA in 1959
Wayatinah			Wayatinah Football Ground, Wayatinah	–	1956	1956-1958	0	-	Merged with Ouse to form Ouse-Wayatinah in Southern Districts FA in 1959

=== Former ===
Club	Colours	Nickname	Home Ground	Former League	Est.	Years in TFA	TFA Senior Premierships		Fate
Club	Colours	Nickname	Home Ground	Former League	Est.	Years in TFA	Total	Years	Fate
Bronte Park			Bronte Park Football Ground, Bronte Park	DVFA	1949	1955-1956	0	-	Folded after 1956 season
Ellendale (original)			Ellendale Football Ground, Ellendale	–	1920	1921-1923	0	-	Folded after 1923 season
Fitzgerald (Tyenna 1921-23, 1926-27)	Dark with light trim		Tyenna Football Ground, Tyenna	–	1920	1921-1923, 1925-1927, 1930, 1937-1940	4	1921, 1922, 1930, 1937	Did not re-form after WWII
Hamilton	(1940-41)(1945)	Rabbits	Hamilton Showgrounds, Hamilton	–	1886	1940-1941, 1945	2	1940, 1941	Moved to Derwent Valley FA in 1946
Keamaree			Keamaree Football Ground, Bushy Park	–	1954	1954	0	-	Folded after 1954 season
Lachlan		Tigers	Lachlan Park Oval, New Norfolk	DVFA	1920	1946-1948, 1954-?	2	1947, 1948	Played in Derwent Valley FA between 1949-53. Entered recess at unknown date after 1954.
Molesworth			Molesworth Football Ground, Molesworth	DVFA	1920	1953-?	2	1953, 1955	Folded at unknown date after 1955 season
National Park		Robins	National Park Football Ground, National Park	–	1920s	1922-1923, 1925-1927, 1930, 1937-1941, 1945-1948	1	1925	Folded after 1948 season
Upper Derwent			Bushy Park Recreation Ground, Bushy Park	DVFA	1904	1945	1	1945	Moved to Derwent Valley FA in 1946
Upper Derwent Juniors			Bushy Park Recreation Ground, Bushy Park	–	1904	1925-1927, 1930, 1938-1939, 1946-1948	0	-	Moved to Derwent Valley FA in 1949
Westerway (Ellendale 1939-48, 1952-53)	(1939)(?-1954)		Ellendale Football Ground, Ellendale	DVFA, SCJFA	1920	1921-1923, 1925-1927, 1937-1941, 1946-1948, 1952-1954	5	1923, 1938, 1939, 1946, 1952	Played in Derwent Valley FA in 1924 and between 1949-51. Folded after 1954 season

== Premierships ==
Year	Premier	Score	Runners-up	Notes
Russell FA (1921-23)
1921	Tyenna	5.6 (36) - 4.5 (29)	Westerway	
1922	Tyenna			
1923	Westerway		Tyenna	
1924	Recess			
Forest Hill Cup FA (1925-27)
1925	National Park			
1926				
1927				
1928-29	Recess			
Tyenna FA (1930-58)
1930	Fitzgerald	5.12 (42) - 4.5 (29)	National Park	
1931-36	Recess			
1937	Fitzgerald	Margin 5 points	Westerway	
1938	Westerway	8.9 (57) - 4.6 (30)	Fitzgerald	
1939	Ellendale	6.11 (47) - 6.11 (47)	Fitzgerald	Drawn grand final
1939	Ellendale	5.24 (54) - 7.12 (54)	Fitzgerald	Drawn replay
1939	Ellendale	9.10 (64) - 8.15 (63)	Fitzgerald	Second replay
1940	Hamilton	8.15 (63) - 8.9 (57)	Ellendale	
1941	Hamilton		Ouse	
1941-45	Recess - WWII			
1945	Upper Derwent	10.17 (77) - 4.7 (31)	Hamilton	
1946	Ellendale		Upper Derwent Juniors	
1947	Lachlan	5.12 (42) - 4.15 (39)	Ellendale	
1948	Lachlan	7.7 (49) - 6.6 (42)	Ellendale	
1949-51	Recess			
1952	Ellendale	Margin 2 points	Maydena	
1953	Molesworth	11.6 (72) - 5.8 (38)	Plenty	
1954	Plenty	5.12 (42) - 3.7 (25)	Lachlan	
1955	Molesworth	10.10 (70) - 8.11 (59)	Bronte Park	
1956	Plenty	6.7 (43) - 5.6 (36)	Maydena	
1957	Maydena	12.17 (89) - 7.8 (50)	Wayatinah	
1958	Maydena	7.10 (52) - 6.9 (45)	Wayatinah	
