= Southern Districts Football Association =

Australian rules football league

Southern District Football Association
- Most recent season or competition: 1970
- Sport: Australian rules football
- Founded: 1924
- First season: 1924
- Folded: 1970
- No. of teams: 4 (1970), 24 (historical)
- Country: Australia
- Last champion: Bothwell (1970)
- Most titles: Bothwell (12)
- Related competitions: South East District FA

The Southern Districts Football Association was an Australian rules football competition based in southern Tasmania.

== History ==
The competition began as the Glenorchy Suburban Football Association, founded in 1924. In its early years the competition catered to clubs located in Glenorchy and the surrounding Hobart suburbs, with teams including Claremont, Moonah, Montrose, Derwent Rovers, Lenah Valley and Glenorchy Flyers participating. The competition underwent a shift from a suburban association to a district-based system in the early 1930s as many of the suburban clubs departed and strong regional clubs such as Bridgewater and Bellerive were admitted. After New Norfolk were admitted in 1934 the competition was renamed the Southern Districts Football Association. Glenorchy dominated the 1930s, winning 5 premierships, but left the association for a year in 1938 as the club felt it was being unfairly treated at committee meetings. The SDFA went into recess in 1941 due to WWII.

The competition re-formed in 1945 with 3 clubs - Bridgewater, Bellerive and New Norfolk. 1946 saw Bothwell join for the first time and Bellerive change its name to Clarence. Both Clarence and New Norfolk accepted invitations to join the Tasmanian Football League in 1947 and were replaced with Glenorchy and Bagdad-Mangalore Rovers. Bothwell won 6 premierships in 7 years between 1947 and 1953. After the competition was reduced to 3 clubs before the 1953 season following the departure of Upper Derwent three new clubs were admitted to bolster numbers - Forcett and South Hobart from the Clarence Sub-District FA and the newly-formed Brighton club. These three clubs would only participate for a brief period. Forcett left South Hobart went into recess during the 1954 season due to injuries and "other influences", Forcett left for the East Coast Football Association after 1955 and Brighton folded after the 1956 season. Glenorchy also departed after the 1956 season, merging with New Town in order to join the TFL.

Many of the smaller leagues in the Derwent Valley began to collapse in the 1950s which saw Hamilton and Upper Derwent join from the Derwent Valley FA in 1955 and Maydena and Ouse-Wayatinah from the Tyenna FA in 1959. The SDFA's days became numbered in the late 1960s. Hamilton folded after the 1966 season and Bridgewater moved to the TAFL Southern Division in 1968. After the 1970 season it was decided that the four remaining clubs join the South East District Football Association the following year.

== Clubs ==
=== Final ===
Club	Colours	Nickname	Home Ground	Former League	Est.	Years in SDFA	SDFA Senior Premierships		Fate
Club	Colours	Nickname	Home Ground	Former League	Est.	Years in SDFA	Total	Years	Fate
Bothwell	(1952)(?-1970)	Rabbits	Bothwell Recreation Reserve, Bothwell	DVFA	1880	1946-1970	12	1947, 1948, 1949, 1951, 1952, 1953, 1954, 1958, 1963, 1964, 1968, 1970	Moved to South East District FA in 1952
Maydena-Westerway	(1959-?)(?-1970)	Bulldogs	Maydena Sports Ground, Maydena	TFA	1952	1959-1964, 1966–1970	0	-	Recess in 1965. Moved to South East District FA in 1971
Ouse (Ouse-Wayatinah 1959-61)		Magpies	Ouse Football Ground, Ouse	TFA	1935	1959-1970	1	1967	Moved to South East District FA in 1952
Upper Derwent			Gretna Football Ground, Gretna	DVFA	1904	1948-1952, 1955–1970	3	1961, 1962, 1969	Played in Derwent Valley FA in 1953–54. Moved to South East District FA in 1971

=== Former ===
Club	Colours	Nickname	Home Ground	Former League	Est.	Years in SDFA	SDFA Senior Premierships		Fate
Club	Colours	Nickname	Home Ground	Former League	Est.	Years in SDFA	Total	Years	Fate
ANM			Boyer Oval, New Norfolk	DVFA	1947	1949	0	-	Folded after 1949 season
Bridgewater		Swans	Weily Park Oval, Bridgewater	BFA	1885	1932-1967	3	1938, 1957, 1966	Moved to TAFL Southern Division in 1968
Brighton			Unknown ground in Brighton	–	1953	1953-1956	0	-	Folded after 1956 season
Claremont			Cadbury Oval, Claremont	C&SFA	1924	1924-1926, 1931–1933, 1938	0	-	Left league after 1926 and 1933 seasons. Entered recess after 1938 season, re-formed in TAFL Southern Division in 1948
Clarence (Bellerive 1933-40)	(?-1940)(1946–47)	Roos	Bellerive Oval, Bellerive	SEFA	1885	1933-1946	3	1937, 1940, 1946	Moved to TFL in 1947
Derwent Rovers	Dark and light hoops			–	1927	1928, 1930–1931	1	1928	Unaffiliated in 1929. Folded after 1931 season
Forcett			Forcett Recreation Ground, Forcett	CSDFA	1884	1953-1955	0	-	Moved to East Coast FA in 1956
Glenorchy		Rovers	KGV Oval, Glenorchy	TFLJ	1919	1924, 1930–1937, 1939–1940, 1947–1956	9	1930, 1931, 1933, 1934, 1935, 1936, 1950, 1955, 1956	Moved to TFL Juniors in 1925. Recess in 1938 and 1946. Merged with New Town to form Glenorchy District in TFL in 1957.
Glenorchy Flyers			Glenorchy Oval, Glenorchy	–	1925	1925-1926	1	1925	Moved to Southern Country FA in 1927
Glenorchy Homing Club		Homers	Glenorchy Oval, Glenorchy	–	1923	1924	0	-	Folded
Glenorchy Seconds			Glenorchy Oval, Glenorchy	–	1919	1926, 1928 (check)	0	-	Played in GSFA while seniors played in TFL Juniors.
Granton			Granton Football Ground, Granton	–	1929	1931	0	-	Folded after 1931 season
Hamilton		Rabbits	Hamilton Showgrounds, Hamilton	TFA	1886	1955-1966	3	1959, 1960, 1965	Folded after 1966 season
Lenah Valley				–	1924	1925	0	-	Moved to Hobart Central FA in 1926
Mangalore (Bagdad-Mangalore Rovers 1947-49)		Robins	Pontville Oval, Pontville	SEDFA	1885	1947-1951	0	-	Returned to South East District FA in 1952
Moonah			Unknown ground in Moonah	–	1914	1925-1926, 1928	0	-	Left league after 1928 season.
Montrose			Montrose Recreation Ground, Montrose	–	1930	1930-1936	1	1932	Folded to allow Glenorchy to field a reserves side in 1937.
New Norfolk	(?-1940)(1945-46)		Boyer Oval, New Norfolk	SCFA	1878	1934-1946	2	1939, 1945	Moved to TFL in 1947
Oatlands		Swans	Oatlands Oval, Oatlands	MFA	1897	1948	0	-	Returned to Midlands FA in 1949
Richmond		Blues	Richmond War Memorial Oval, Richmond	RFA	1878	1937-1938	0	-	Entered recess after 1938 season, re-formed without affiliating in 1940.
South Hobart			Unknown ground in South Hobart	CSDFA	1891	1953-?	0	-	Most likely folded after 1954 season, which they did not complete.

== Premierships ==
Year	Premier	Score	Runners-up	Notes
1924	?			
1925	Glenorchy Flyers			
1926	?			
1927	No competition			
1928	Derwent Rovers			
1929	No competition			
1930	Glenorchy	8.13 (61) - 8.9 (57)	Derwent Rovers	
1931	Glenorchy			
1932	Montrose			
1933	Glenorchy	7.9 (51) - 6.10 (46)	Montrose	
1934	Glenorchy	13.5 (83) - 4.9 (33)	New Norfolk	
1935	Glenorchy	14.13 (97) - 10.12 (72)	Montrose	
1936	Glenorchy	6.3 (39) - 4.11 (35)	Bellerive	
1937	Bellerive	12.9 (81) - 10.6 (66)	Bridgewater	
1938	Bridgewater	15.13 (103) - 11.15 (81)	Bellerive	
1939	New Norfolk	14.9 (93) - 12.12 (84)	Bellerive	
1940	Bellerive	11.9 (75) - 7.17 (59)	Glenorchy	
1941-44	SDFA in recess (WWII)			
1945	New Norfolk	12.12 (84) - 1.5 (11)	Clarence	
1946	Clarence	11.9 (75) - 8.10 (58)	Bothwell	
1947	Bothwell	8.8 (56) - 7.11 (53)	Glenorchy	
1948	Bothwell	12.8 (80) - 6.7 (43)	Bridgewater	
1949	Bothwell	9.8 (62) - 9.4 (58)	Glenorchy	
1950	Glenorchy	9.12 (66) - 9.6 (60)	Bothwell	
1951	Bothwell	10.18 (78) - 4.6 (30)	Glenorchy	
1952	Bothwell	10.16 (76) - 5.6 (36)	Bridgewater	
1953	Bothwell	15.12 (102) - 9.12 (66)	Glenorchy	
1954	Bothwell	9.13 (67) - 2.7 (19)	Glenorchy	
1955	Glenorchy	12.16 (88) - 12.10 (82)	Bothwell	
1956	Glenorchy	14.12 (96) - 8.5 (53)	Upper Derwent	
1957	Bridgewater	15.16 (106) - 9.11 (65)	Hamilton	
1958	Bothwell	12.14 (86) - 10.22 (82)	Hamilton	
1959	Hamilton	13.9 (87) - 5.9 (39)	Upper Derwent	
1960	Hamilton	14.9 (93) - 13.14 (92)	Upper Derwent	
1961	Upper Derwent	15.15 (105) - 6.9 (45)	Bothwell	
1962	Upper Derwent	8.6 (54) - 6.7 (43)	Maydena	
1963	Bothwell	13.20 (98) - 8.10 (58)	Hamilton	
1964	Bothwell	7.7 (49) - 6.4 (40)	Maydena	
1965	Hamilton	13.15 (93) - 10.14 (74)	Bothwell	
1966	Bridgewater	10.7 (67) - 6.15 (51)	Maydena	
1967	Ouse	13.14 (92) - 8.12 (60)	Bothwell	
1968	Bothwell	10.8 (68) - 8.9 (57)	Ouse	
1969	Upper Derwent	16.15 (111) - 8.9 (57)	Ouse	
1970	Bothwell	11.6 (72) - 7.8 (50)	Upper Derwent	
