= Derwent Valley, Tasmania =

Valley in Tasmania, Australia

Derwent Valley
- Valley of Love
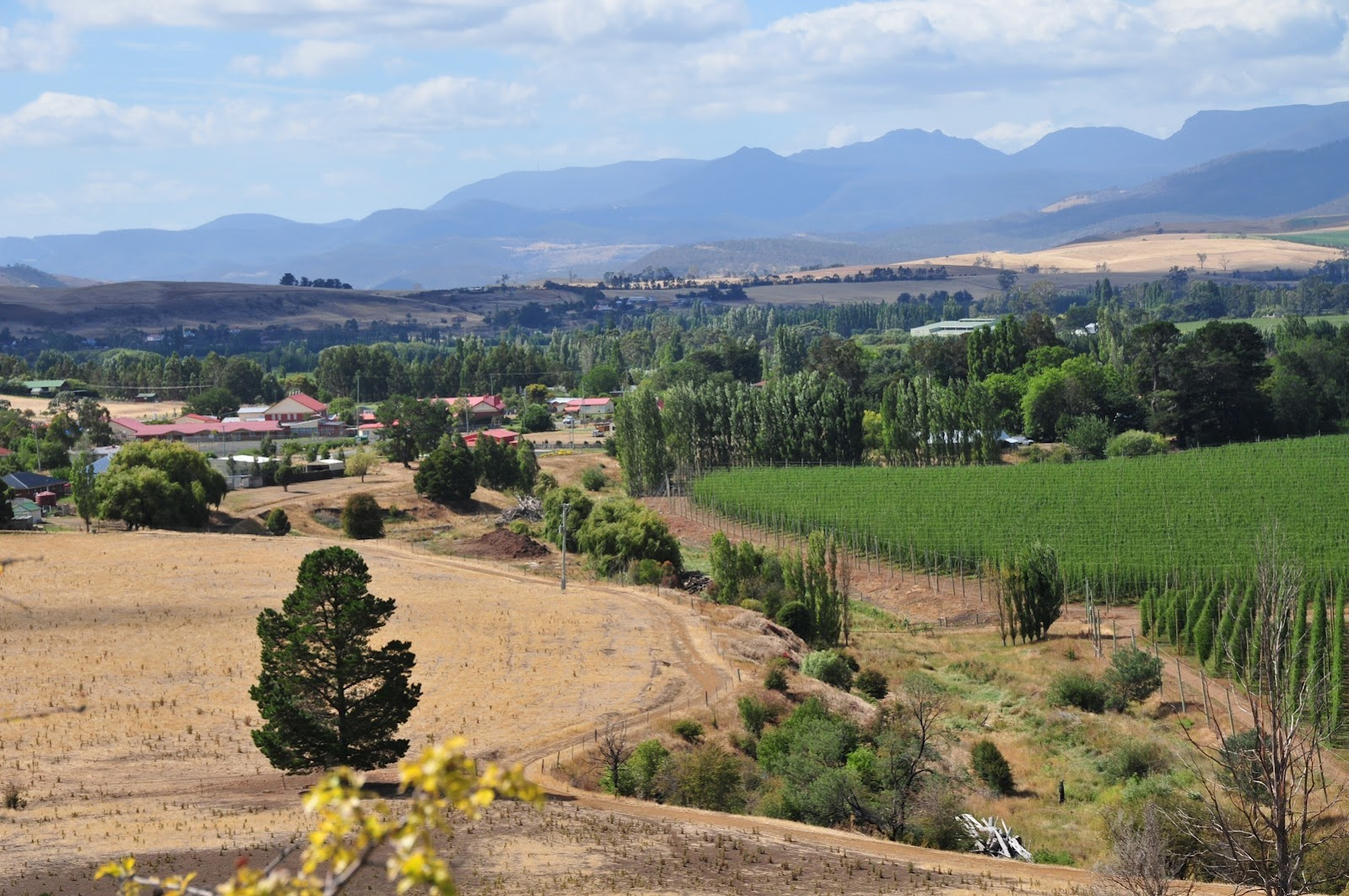
- Derwent Valley vistas from the Lyell Highway, 2009

- Location within Tasmania
- Area: 4,111 km^{2} (1,587 sq mi)

Geography
- Location: Tasmania, Australia
- Population centers: New Norfolk, Bushy Park, Maydena and Strathgordon
- Coordinates: 42°48′11.17″S 146°32′38.55″E
- Rivers: River Derwent, Plenty River
- Interactive map of Derwent Valley

The Derwent Valley is a river valley and geographic area located in southern Tasmania, Australia. The largest town is New Norfolk, with other smaller towns spread across the area. The Derwent Valley area had a population of 10,942 in 2021. Commencing at Lake St Clair and spanning 239 kilometres (149 mi) to the state capital of Hobart, the River Derwent receives contributions from numerous tributaries and plays a role in Tasmania's intricate hydroelectric system at certain points. Renowned for its agricultural output, the Derwent Valley was initially settled by British colonists during the 1800s. Prior to colonisation, the area was inhabited by the Leenowwenne peoples of the Big River district.

== Economy ==
The economy of the Derwent Valley is diverse, with a blend of agriculture (specifically horticulture and viticulture), tourism, small businesses, and local industries contributing to the region's economic activities.

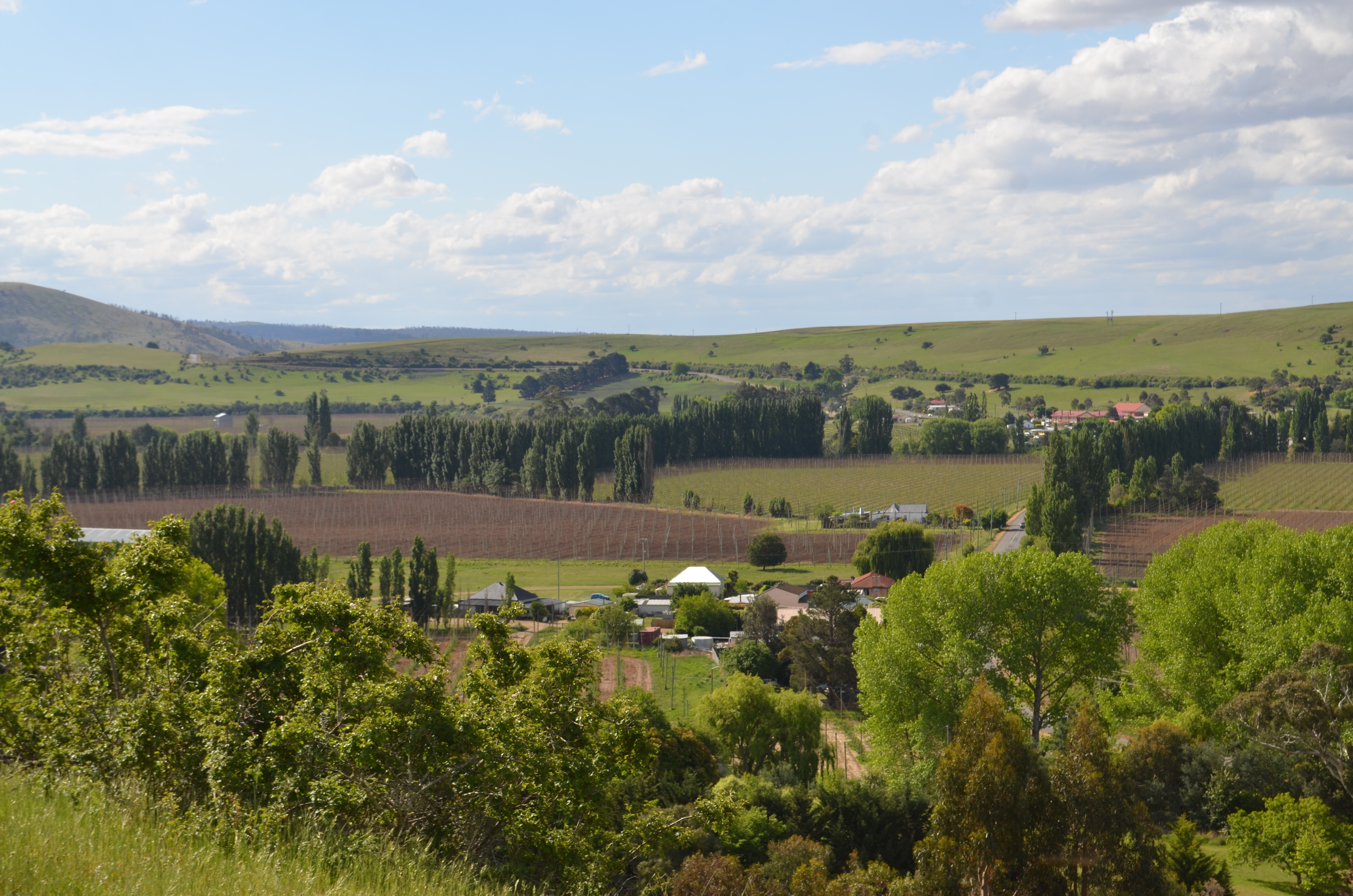
Bushy Park in 2014

The hop industry in the Derwent Valley has held considerable importance as a primary sector and for many years was the most successful hop growing area in the Southern Hemisphere. Beginning in 1849, the Shoobridge family played a pivotal role in advancing the prosperity and development of hop cultivation in the Derwent Valley. Records indicate the initial mention of hops in Tasmania's agricultural reports in 1854. For an impressive span of 65 years, the Shoobridge family diligently farmed the Bushy Park properties, dedicating the majority of this time to consistent hop production. This sustained effort resulted in Bushy Park becoming renowned as the most prosperous hop-growing region in the southern hemisphere.

The valley is renowned for its fertile soils and favorable climate, making it an ideal area for agriculture. The region produces a variety of agricultural products, including fruits like apples, cherries, berries, and stone fruits, as well as vegetables. Many farms in the Derwent Valley engage in horticulture and orcharding, contributing significantly to Tasmania's agricultural output. There are thriving trout and salmon fish hatcheries, exemplified by the Salmon Ponds, founded in 1864 with the aim of introducing salmon to the region. While the initial salmon introduction didn't succeed as anticipated, focus shifted to trout, also imported from England. This hatchery served as the cornerstone for trout hatcheries across Australia and New Zealand. Presently, the Salmon Ponds continue to supply trout stock for Tasmania's lakes and rivers.

The picturesque landscapes and historical significance of the Derwent Valley attract tourists. Visitors are drawn to the region's natural beauty, heritage sites, and outdoor recreational activities. Tourism-related businesses such as accommodations, restaurants, local markets, and adventure tourism activities play a role in the local economy. The Derwent Valley hosts Mount Field National Park, among Australia's oldest preserved natural landscapes. This park shelters distinctive Tasmanian wildlife and plants, including rare native species and some of the globe's tallest trees. It boasts lakes, snow-covered peaks in winter, and breathtaking waterfalls like Lady Barron Falls, Horseshoe Falls, and Russell Falls. Visitors can engage in various activities such as hiking, nocturnal glow worm tours, skiing, spelunking, and camping within the park's bounds.

Historically, the Derwent Valley has been involved in forestry and timber-related activities. While this sector has undergone changes over the years, forestry remains a part of the region's economy.

== History ==
The area was first settled by Europeans in the early 1800s. The Derwent Valley Railway opened on the 1 September 1887.

== Media ==
The Derwent Valley hosts The Derwent Valley Gazette, a weekly local newspaper, and the New Norfolk and Derwent Valley News, an online new resource. Edge Radio is the local youth radio station and New Norfolk is the headquarters of TYGA FM, a community radio station.

== See also ==
- List of valleys of Australia § Tasmania

== Sources ==
- "Investment Prospectus" (PDF), Derwent Valley Council, 2020, archived from the original (PDF) on 31 October 2023
- "Derwent Valley Inventory of Tourism Assets Summary Report" (PDF), Derwent Valley Council, 2018, archived from the original (PDF) on 17 November 2023
- Bester, Damian; Derwent Valley (Tas.). Council (2008), The Derwent Valley : from Federation to Millennium Volume II, Derwent Valley Council Historical Information Centre, ISBN 978-1-876391-03-4
- Kiernan, K (1 January 1991), Glacial history of the upper Derwent Valley, Tasmania
- Paul Davies Pty Ltd (1997), Derwent Valley hop industry survey : final report, Dept. of Environment and Land Management
