= Uxbridge, Tasmania =

Uxbridge
- Town
- Coordinates: 42°45′30″S 146°52′32″E
- Country: Australia
- State: Tasmania
- Region: South-east
- LGA: Derwent Valley
- Location: 27 km (17 mi) W of New Norfolk

Government
  - State electorate: Lyons
  - Federal division: Lyons

Population
  - Total: 40 (SAL 2021)
- Postcode: 7140
Localities around Uxbridge
Styx	Bushy Park	Bushy Park
Styx	Uxbridge	Moogara
Styx	Moogara	Moogara

Uxbridge is a rural locality in the local government area (LGA) of Derwent Valley in the South-east LGA region of Tasmania. The locality is about 27 kilometres (17 mi) west of the town of New Norfolk. It is a populated place in the West Coast subregion of Tasmania, with postal code 7140.

Uxbridge is located in a rural section of Tasmania in the Derwent Valley, to the west of New Norfolk, southwest off the A 10 Highway, and east of the Mount Field National Park, at an approximate elevation of 514 metres (1,686 ft).

== History ==
Uxbridge was gazetted as a locality in 1976. It is believed to be named for a town in England. The name was first used for the parish, and by 1884 had been applied to the locality. A post office opened in 1887 and closed in 1966.

The 2016 census recorded a population of 26 for the state suburb of Uxbridge. At the 2021 census, the population had increased to 40.

== Geography ==
Most of the boundaries are survey lines or ridge lines. The Styx River forms a small part of the western boundary.

== Road infrastructure ==
Route C610 (Uxbridge Road / Moogara Road) runs through the north-east corner.
