= Black Hills, Tasmania =

Black Hills
- Town
- Coordinates: 42°42′59″S 147°01′15″E
- Country: Australia
- State: Tasmania
- Region: Central, South-east
- LGA: Southern Midlands, Derwent Valley
- Location: 12 km (7.5 mi) N of New Norfolk

Government
  - State electorate: Lyons
  - Federal division: Lyons

Population
  - Total: 179 (2016 census)
- Postcode: 7140
Localities around Black Hills
Gretna	Gretna, Broadmarsh	Broadmarsh
Rosegarland, Gretna, Hayes	Black Hills	Broadmarsh, Magra
Hayes	Hayes, Lawitta	Magra

Black Hills is a rural locality in the local government areas (LGA) of Southern Midlands and Derwent Valley in the Central and South-east LGA regions of Tasmania. The locality is about 12 kilometres (7.5 mi) north of the town of New Norfolk. The 2016 census recorded a population of 179 for the state suburb of Black Hills.

== History ==
Black Hills was gazetted as a locality in 1968. It was previously known as Oberlin.

== Geography ==
Many of the boundaries of the locality consist of survey lines.

== Road infrastructure ==
Route C184 (Black Hills Road) passes through from south-east to south-west.
