= Glenfern, Tasmania =

Glenfern
- Town
- Coordinates: 42°48′39″S 146°59′55″E
- Country: Australia
- State: Tasmania
- Region: South-east
- LGA: Derwent Valley
- Location: 10 km (6.2 mi) SW of New Norfolk

Government
  - State electorate: Lyons
  - Federal division: Lyons

Population
  - Total: 189 (2016 census)
- Postcode: 7140
Localities around Glenfern
| Plenty | Plenty | New Norfolk, Lawitta |
| Mount Lloyd, Moogara | Glenfern | New Norfolk, Lachlan |
| Mount Lloyd, Moogara | Mount Lloyd, Wellington Park | Lachlan |

Glenfern is a rural locality in the local government area (LGA) of Derwent Valley in the South-east LGA region of Tasmania. The locality is about 10 kilometres (6.2 mi) south-west of the town of New Norfolk. The 2016 census recorded a population of 189 for the state suburb of Glenfern.

== History ==
Glenfern was gazetted as a locality in 1976. It was previously known as Glen Fern.

== Geography ==
The Plenty River forms the western boundary. A small portion of the northern boundary abuts the Derwent River.

== Road infrastructure ==
Route C610 (Glenfern Road / Plenty Valley Road) runs through from north-east to north-west.
