= Collinsvale =

- Suburb
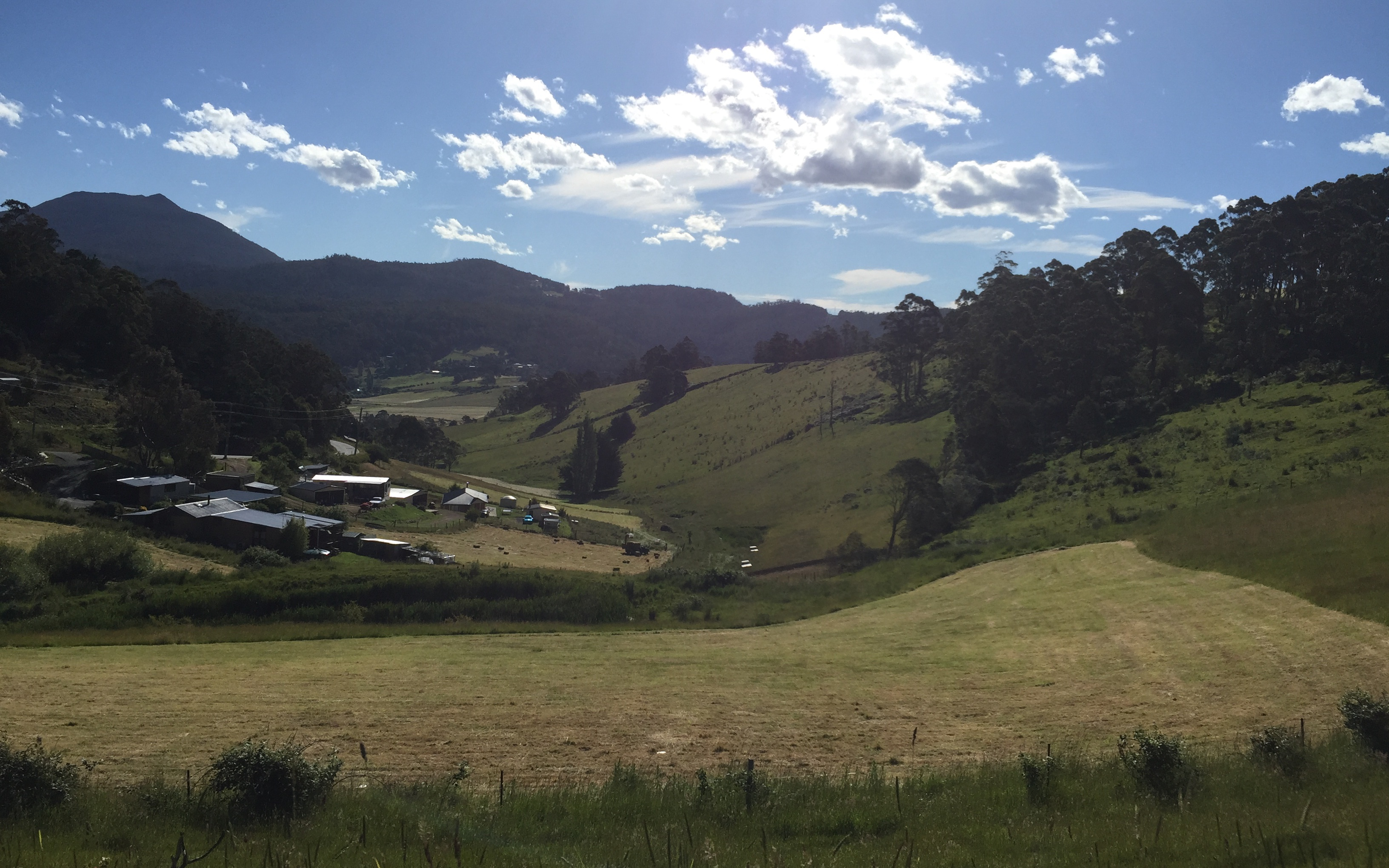

- Interactive map of Collinsvale
- Coordinates: 42°50′34″S 147°11′21″E
- Country: Australia
- State: Tasmania
- Region: South-east, Hobart
- City: Hobart
- LGA: City of Glenorchy (75%), Derwent Valley Council (25%)
- Location: 11 km (6.8 mi) W of Glenorchy
- Established: 1881

Government
  - State electorates: Clark; Lyons
  - Federal divisions: Clark; Lyons

Area
  - Total: 19.6 km^{2} (7.6 sq mi)

Population
  - Total: 631 (SAL 2021)
  - Density: 31.3/km^{2} (81/sq mi)
- Postcode: 7012
Suburbs around Collinsvale
Molesworth	Glenlusk	Chigwell
Molesworth	Collinsvale	Glenorchy
Wellington Park	Wellington Park	Wellington Park

Collinsvale, formerly known as Bismarck (German: [ˈbɪsmaʁk] BISS-mark), is a rural residential locality in the local government areas (LGA) of Glenorchy (75%) and Derwent Valley (25%) in the south-east of Tasmania. The locality is about 11 kilometres (6.8 mi) west of the town of Glenorchy. The 2016 census recorded a population of 630 for the state suburb of Collinsvale.

Collinsvale has been known to snow.

== History ==
Collinsvale was gazetted as a locality in 1961. The area was originally known as Sorell Creek, and was inhabited mostly by British settlers in the mid-nineteenth century.

=== Arrival of the Lutherans ===
In 1870, the arrival of the first immigrant ships to Hobart saw a large influx of German and Danish migrants who settled in the area, attracted by the cheap land and an abundance of clean water.

The settlement was proclaimed a town in 1881, and was named Bismarck after Otto von Bismarck, the then-Chancellor of Germany. "The name Bismarck had been given to the place out of compliment to the German settlers."

The Lutheran Church was very slow to establish in Tasmania. Due to the lack of a stabilising Lutheran presence, some of the Germans in Bismarck ended up joining the American fundamentalists, the Seventh Day Adventists, who arrived in the region in 1889. A Lutheran church was finally opened in Hobart on 11 August 1871 and remains active today but none was ever built in Bismarck. This led to a fracturing of the community and a loss of its German identity.

=== Change of name ===
At the start of the First World War, Bismarck was renamed Collinsvale after a jingoistic letter-writing campaign. (David Collins had been the Tasmanian colony's first governor.)

This name change had been opposed by "a number of Bismarck residents...[who] presented a lengthy petition setting forth reasons against the proposed name change." Opposing a previous petition that had instigated the called for the change, "Councillor G H Voss said [his] deputation, which comprised himself, Misters Alfred Totenhöfer, H J Smith, Levi Newman, Walter Neilsen, W Brockman, Fred Gall, and F and H Fehlberg was composed entirely of residents in the postal area of Bismarck... The petition he had to present contained 120 names of settlers residing in the postal area... The petition opposed the proposal to alter the name on personal grounds, and the petitioners were practically all of Tasmanian birth, including descendants of the Danish and German settlers who had really founded the settlement... On general grounds it was urged that the change of name would create bad feeling amongst settlers who had hitherto dwelt in amity together... Mr Voss said that the produce of Bismarck would compare with any in the State and their [agricultural] shows had won a good reputation.

Referring to a statement made by a speaker of the previous deputation that the produce of the district might be prejudiced owing to its place of origin, Mr Voss contended that there was no foundation in that argument. On the contrary it would be a serious thing if the name were changed seeing that the produce of Bismarck had an excellent reputation and always fetched top prices.

The petitioners were not infatuated with the name of Bismarck as such and did not base their case on the fact that it had been borne by a German statesman but the name was a reasonable one and was not difficult to pronounce like so many German names. The settlers of Bismarck all spoke the British language and they had no differences on racial matters... Bismarck produce was branded with the name of the grower and the settlement and he had never heard of any objection on account of the name. As a tourist resort the name was an attraction and if the name were changed the traffic would suffer. Bismarck Shows had been famous for the quality of the produce exhibited... The deputation desired to retain a name under which they had built up a reputation for good produce." As they predicted, the town's reputation never recovered. "Collinsvale" was never to develop the reputation for quality produce that Bismarck had established and the area went into decline.

This name change marked the beginning of the persecution of Tasmanians of German descent, who were the largest non-British national group in the local population. In one case Gustav Weindorfer was accused of being a German spy and using his chalet at Cradle Mountain as a radio station to contact German ships. He was expelled from the Ulverstone Club and his dog was poisoned."

== Geography ==
Most of the boundaries are survey lines.

== Road infrastructure ==
Route C615 (Molesworth Road / Glenlusk Road) passes to the north. From there, Collinsvale Road provides access to the locality.

== See also ==
- German Australian
- Danish Australian
- Australian place names changed from German names
- Ethnic Germans
- Germans Abroad
- History of the Lutheran Church of Australia
