= Macquarie Plains, Tasmania =

Macquarie Plains
- Town
- Coordinates: 42°43′01″S 146°55′01″E
- Country: Australia
- State: Tasmania
- Region: South-east
- LGA: Derwent Valley
- Location: 17 km (11 mi) NW of New Norfolk

Government
  - State electorate: Lyons
  - Federal division: Lyons

Population
  - Total: 44 (2016 census)
- Postcode: 7140
Localities around Macquarie Plains
Glenora	Glenora, Gretna	Rosegarland, Gretna
Bushy Park, Glenora	Macquarie Plains	Rosegarland, Plenty
Bushy Park	Bushy Park, Plenty	Plenty

Macquarie Plains is a rural locality in the local government area of Derwent Valley in the South-east region of Tasmania. The locality is about 17 kilometres (11 mi) north-west of the town of New Norfolk. The 2016 census recorded a population of 44 for the state suburb of Macquarie Plains.

== History ==
Macquarie Plains was gazetted as a locality in 1959. The locality was named in honour of New South Wales Governor Lachlan Macquarie.

== Geography ==
The Derwent River forms most of the western boundary, all of the southern, and part of the eastern. It also flows through the central western section from north to south. The Derwent Valley rail line passes through from south-east to west.

== Road infrastructure ==
The B61 route (Gordon River Road) enters from the north-east and runs through to the west, where it exits.
