= Hayes, Tasmania =

Hayes
- Town
- Coordinates: 42°45′44″S 147°0′49″E
- Country: Australia
- State: Tasmania
- Region: South-east
- LGA: Derwent Valley Council
- Location: 6 km (3.7 mi) NW of New Norfolk

Government
  - State electorate: Lyons
  - Federal division: Lyons

Population
  - Total: 110 (2016 census)
- Postcode: 7140
Localities around Hayes
Rosegarland	Black Hills	Black Hills
Rosegarland	Hayes	Lawitta
Plenty	Plenty	New Norfolk

Hayes is a rural locality in the local government area (LGA) of Derwent Valley in the South-east LGA region of Tasmania. The locality is about 6 kilometres (3.7 mi) north-west of the town of New Norfolk. The 2016 census recorded a population of 110 for the state suburb of Hayes.

== History ==
Hayes was gazetted as a locality in 1970.

== Geography ==
The River Derwent forms the south-western boundary, and Johnnys Creek forms part of the eastern before flowing through to the Derwent.

== Road infrastructure ==
Route A10 (Lyell Highway) runs through from south-east to south-west.
