= Sorell Creek, Tasmania =

Locality in Tasmania, Australia

Sorell Creek Tasmania
- Coordinates: 42°46′39″S 147°07′26″E
- Population: 89 (2016 census)
- Postcode(s): 7140
- Location: 6 km (4 mi) E of New Norfolk
- LGA(s): Derwent Valley
- Region: South-east
- State electorate(s): Lyons
- Federal division(s): Lyons
Localities around Sorell Creek:
New Norfolk	Boyer	Granton
New Norfolk	Sorell Creek	Granton
Lachlan	Malbina, Molesworth	Molesworth

Sorell Creek is a rural residential locality in the local government area of Derwent Valley in the South-east region of Tasmania. It is located about 6 kilometres (3.7 mi) east of the town of New Norfolk. The 2016 census determined a population of 89 for the state suburb of Sorell Creek.

== History ==
Sorell Creek was gazetted as a locality in 1970.

== Geography ==
The Derwent River forms the northern boundary. Sorell Creek (the watercourse) forms part of the southern boundary before flowing through to the north.

== Road infrastructure ==
The Lyell Highway (A10) enters from the east and runs through to the west, where it exits. Route C615 (Molesworth Road) starts at an intersection with A10 and runs south until it exits.
