= Moogara =

- Town
- Coordinates: 42°47′S 146°54′E
- Country: Australia
- State: Tasmania
- Region: South-east
- LGA: Derwent Valley
- Location: 14 km (8.7 mi) W of New Norfolk

Government
  - State electorate: Lyons
  - Federal division: Lyons

Population
  - Total: 49 (2016 census)
- Postcode: 7140
Localities around Moogara
Uxbridge, Bushy Park	Bushy Park	Plenty
Uxbridge, Styx	Moogara	Glenfern, Mount Lloyd
Lonnavale	Lonnavale	Mount Lloyd

Moogara is a rural locality in the local government area (LGA) of Derwent Valley in the South-east LGA region of Tasmania. The locality is about 14 kilometres (8.7 mi) west of the town of New Norfolk. The 2016 census recorded a population of 49 for the state suburb of Moogara.

== Geography ==
It is situated approximately 37 kilometres (23 mi) from Hobart (direct line), Moogara used to be a bustling hamlet with 100 families, some of which had up to 16 children, it had its own school, general store, saw mills and farms. While Moogara's population is not as high as it once was, it is still home to several families some of which are direct descendants of those who originally settled in the area. The Plenty River forms much of the eastern boundary.

== History ==
Moogara is a confirmed locality.

It was named by Barney McGuire. He named it Moogara as it is Aboriginal for "Journey of one day" as it took him this long to walk from Plenty to select his property.

Moogara's hub was the post office, which began business on 11 November 1911 under Mrs H. Simco. On 1 September 1924 it was taken over by Amos McGuire; it was run by the McGuire family until it closed on 31 January 1970. Emma Townsend (née McGuire) was the last postmistress; Emma and husband Norman lived where the old post office was located until 1999.

== Road infrastructure ==
Route C610 (Moogara Road) passes through from north-east to north-west.

== Climate ==
Climate data for Moogara
Month	Jan	Feb	Mar	Apr	May	Jun	Jul	Aug	Sep	Oct	Nov	Dec	Year
Record high °C (°F)	34.5 (94.1)	33.7 (92.7)	32.5 (90.5)	26.0 (78.8)	21.0 (69.8)	15.2 (59.4)	14.5 (58.1)	19.0 (66.2)	22.0 (71.6)	28.0 (82.4)	29.0 (84.2)	33.0 (91.4)	34.5 (94.1)
Mean daily maximum °C (°F)	19.6 (67.3)	19.8 (67.6)	17.2 (63.0)	13.8 (56.8)	11.2 (52.2)	9.0 (48.2)	8.5 (47.3)	9.6 (49.3)	11.3 (52.3)	13.4 (56.1)	15.5 (59.9)	17.5 (63.5)	13.9 (57.0)
Mean daily minimum °C (°F)	8.4 (47.1)	8.6 (47.5)	7.0 (44.6)	5.3 (41.5)	4.2 (39.6)	2.5 (36.5)	2.2 (36.0)	2.3 (36.1)	3.2 (37.8)	4.2 (39.6)	5.4 (41.7)	6.9 (44.4)	5.0 (41.0)
Record low °C (°F)	0.8 (33.4)	0.5 (32.9)	−1.5 (29.3)	−2.0 (28.4)	−2.5 (27.5)	−3.8 (25.2)	−3.7 (25.3)	−3.0 (26.6)	−3.0 (26.6)	−2.3 (27.9)	−1.7 (28.9)	−1.2 (29.8)	−3.8 (25.2)
Average precipitation mm (inches)	50.3 (1.98)	50.7 (2.00)	48.7 (1.92)	57.2 (2.25)	60.4 (2.38)	66.9 (2.63)	75.0 (2.95)	102.5 (4.04)	92.1 (3.63)	84.9 (3.34)	68.3 (2.69)	63.4 (2.50)	847.4 (33.36)
Average precipitation days	13.1	11.4	15.1	16.9	19.9	19.6	22.6	22.2	21.3	20.2	16.5	15.4	214.2
Average afternoon relative humidity (%)	55	56	60	68	76	79	77	72	67	63	61	57	66
Source: Bureau of Meteorology
