= Malbina, Tasmania =

Malbina Tasmania
- Coordinates: 42°47′13″S 147°07′06″E
- Population: 67 (2016 census)
- Postcode(s): 7140
- Location: 6 km (4 mi) E of New Norfolk
- LGA(s): Derwent Valley
- Region: South-east
- State electorate(s): Lyons
- Federal division(s): Lyons
Localities around Malbina:
Sorell Creek	Sorell Creek	Sorell Creek
Sorell Creek	Malbina	Sorell Creek
Molesworth	Molesworth	Molesworth

Malbina is a rural locality in the local government area (LGA) of Derwent Valley in the South-east LGA region of Tasmania. The locality is about 6 kilometres (3.7 mi) east of the town of New Norfolk. The 2016 census recorded a population of 67 for the state suburb of Malbina.

== History ==
Malbina was gazetted as a locality in 1970.

The locality was originally called Molesworth, but was changed to avoid confusion with other places. Malbina is believed to be an Aboriginal word for “drake”.

== Geography ==
Sorell Creek forms the northern and eastern boundaries.

== Road infrastructure ==
Route C615 (Molesworth Road) runs through from north to south.
