= Mount Lloyd, Tasmania =

Mount Lloyd Tasmania
- Coordinates: 42°49′52″S 146°56′47″E
- Population: 55 (2016 census)
- Postcode(s): 7140
- Location: 16 km (10 mi) SW of New Norfolk
- LGA(s): Derwent Valley
- Region: South-east
- State electorate(s): Lyons
- Federal division(s): Lyons
Localities around Mount Lloyd:
Moogara	Glenfern	Glenfern
Moogara	Mount Lloyd	Glenfern, Wellington Park, Judbury
Lonnavale	Judbury	Judbury

Mount Lloyd is a rural locality in the local government area (LGA) of Derwent Valley in the South-east LGA region of Tasmania. The locality is about 16 kilometres (9.9 mi) south-west of the town of New Norfolk. The 2016 census recorded a population of 55 for the state suburb of Mount Lloyd.

== History ==
Mount Lloyd was gazetted as a locality in 1976.

== Geography ==
The Plenty River forms part of the western boundary.

== Road infrastructure ==
Route C610 (Plenty Valley Road) passes to the north. From there, the Plenty Link and Glenfern Road provide access to the locality.
