= TYGA FM =

Coordinates: 42°46′58″S 147°03′34″E

Tyga FM
New Norfolk, Tasmania; Australia
- Broadcast area: Derwent Valley
- Frequency: 98.9 MHz FM

Programming
- Language: English
- Format: Community Radio

Links
- Website: www.tygafm.org.au

TYGA FM (call sign: 7TYG) is a community radio station located in New Norfolk, Tasmania, Australia, broadcasting on 98.9 MHz.

== History ==
TYGA FM is a community radio station operated by Derwent Valley Community Radio Inc and began transmitting on Monday, 14 December 2009, at 10:00 am. The station moved to the New Norfolk High School's Science & Language Centre in a purpose-built facility in 2012. In 2020, the station moved to its current home in the former court house at 1 Circle Street, New Norfolk. TYGA FM aims to provide a community radio service to residents of the Derwent Valley and Southern Central Highlands. The station now provides a wide variety of different programs hosted by a variety of presenters and broadcasts 24 hours a day, 7 days a week.
