= Judbury, Tasmania =

Judbury
- Town
- Coordinates: 42°59′27″S 146°55′11″E
- Country: Australia
- State: Tasmania
- Region: South-east
- LGA: Huon Valley
- Location: 16 km (9.9 mi) NW of Huonville

Government
  - State electorate: Franklin
  - Federal division: Franklin

Population
  - Total: 392 (2016 census)
- Postcode: 7109
Localities around Judbury
Mount Lloyd	Wellington Park	Wellington Park
Mount Lloyd, Lonnavale	Judbury	Crabtree, Lucaston, Ranelagh
Geeveston	Glen Huon, Geeveston	Glen Huon

Judbury is a rural residential locality in the local government area of Huon Valley in the South-east region of Tasmania. It is located about 16 kilometres (9.9 mi) north-west of the town of Huonville. The 2016 census recorded a population of 392 for the state suburb of Judbury.

== History ==
Judbury is a confirmed suburb/locality. Previously known as Judds Creek after the first settler (in 1855) John Cane Judd, the current name has been in use since 1924.

== Geography ==
The Huon River forms most of the south-western boundary, before flowing through and forming part of the south-eastern boundary. The Russell River forms a small part of the south-western boundary before it empties into The Huon River.

== Road infrastructure ==
The C619 route (Glen Huon Road) enters from the south-east, crosses to the north side of the Huon River and enters the village. Here it turns south-east as North Huon Road and continues to the eastern boundary, where it exits.
