= Glenlusk =

Glenlusk Hobart, Tasmania
- Coordinates: 42°49′26″S 147°12′3″E
- Population: 200 (2016 census)
- Postcode(s): 7012
- Location: 8 km (5 mi) W of Glenorchy
- LGA(s): City of Glenorchy (94%), Derwent Valley Council (6%)
- Region: South-east, Hobart
- State electorate(s): Clark
- Federal division(s): Clark
Suburbs around Glenlusk:
Molesworth	Claremont	Chigwell
Collinsvale	Glenlusk	Berriedale, Collinsvale
Collinsvale	Collinsvale	Collinsvale

Glenlusk is a rural locality in the local government areas (LGA) of Derwent Valley (6%) and Glenorchy (94%) in the South-east and Hobart LGA regions of Tasmania. The locality is about 8 kilometres (5.0 mi) west of the town of Glenorchy. The 2016 census recorded a population of 200 for the state suburb of Glenlusk. It is a semi-rural suburb of Hobart. It is west of Chigwell.

== History ==
Glenlusk was gazetted as a locality in 1961.

== Geography ==
Sorell Creek forms part of the western boundary. Most of the boundaries are survey lines or ridge lines.

== Road infrastructure ==
Route C615 (Glenlusk Road / Molesworth Road) runs through from east to west after following the eastern boundary for a short distance.
