= Lachlan, Tasmania =

Lachlan
- Town
- Coordinates: 42°50′03″S 147°02′46″E
- Country: Australia
- State: Tasmania
- Region: South-east
- LGA: Derwent Valley
- Location: 8 km (5.0 mi) S of New Norfolk

Government
  - State electorate: Lyons
  - Federal division: Lyons

Population
  - Total: 841 (2016 census)
- Postcode: 7140
Localities around Lachlan
Glenfern	New Norfolk	Sorell Creek
Glenfern	Lachlan	Molesworth
Wellington Park	Wellington Park	Wellington Park

Lachlan is a rural residential locality in the local government area of Derwent Valley in the South-east region of Tasmania. It is located about 8 kilometres (5.0 mi) south of the town of New Norfolk. The 2016 census determined a population of 841 for the state suburb of Lachlan.

== History ==
Lachlan is a confirmed suburb/locality.

== Geography ==
The boundaries of the locality are almost all survey lines. The Lachlan River flows through from south to north.

== Road infrastructure ==
The C613 route (Lachlan Road) enters from the north and runs to the centre of the locality, where it ends.
