= Blair Street Bridge =

Bridge over the River Derwent in New Norfolk, Tasmania, Australia

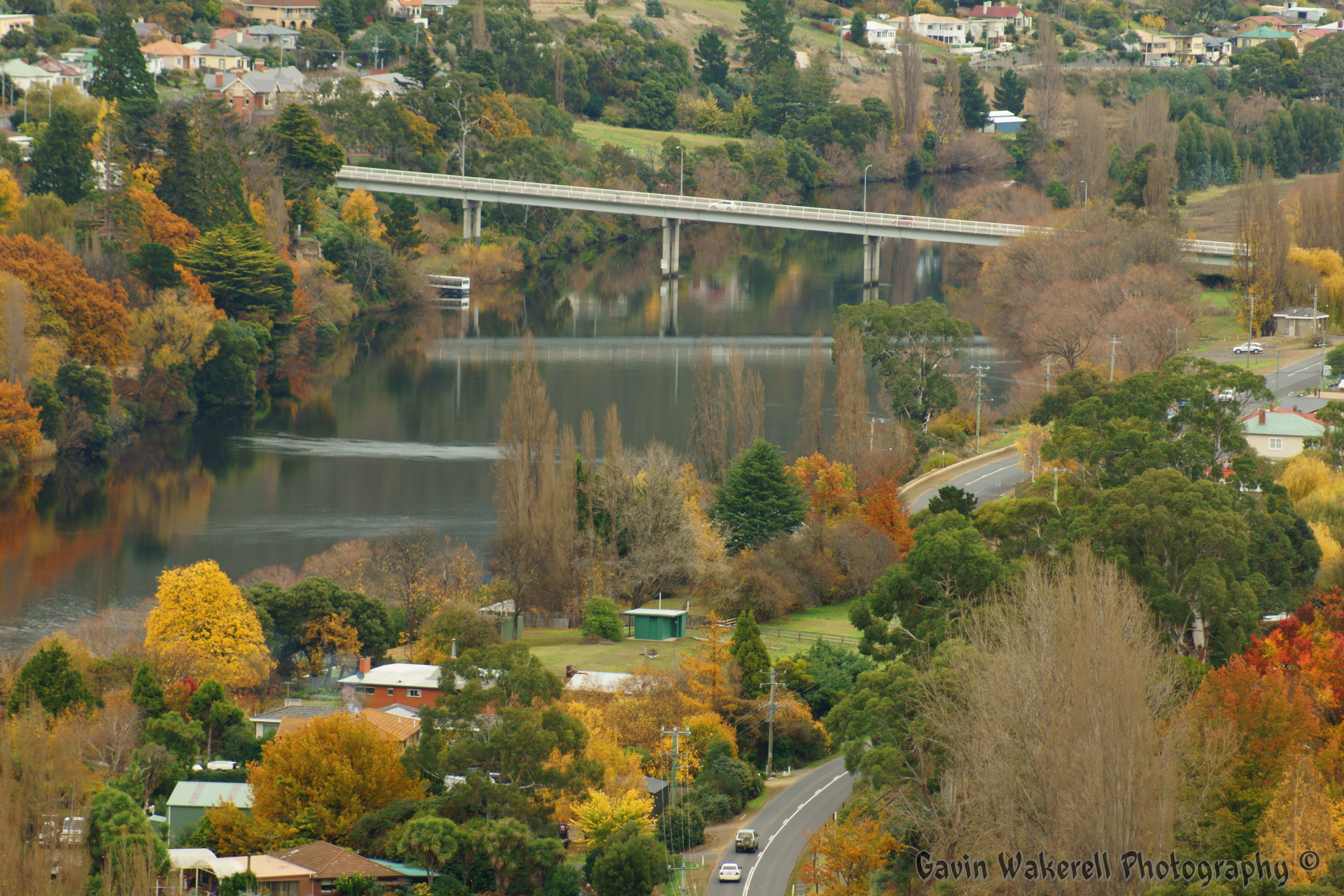
- Coordinates: 42°46′44.68″S 147°3′24.03″E
- Carries: Lyell Highway
- Crosses: River Derwent
- Locale: New Norfolk
- Other name: New Norfolk Bridge
- Maintained by: Building Tasmania
- Followed by: Bridgewater Bridge

Characteristics
- Design: Concrete and steel girder bridge
- Total length: 200 metres (650 ft)
- Width: 12 metres (41 ft)
- Height: 4.6 metres (15 ft)
- Longest span: 35 metres (116 ft)
- No. of spans: 6
- Piers in water: 5
- Clearance below: 4.6 metres (15 ft)
- No. of lanes: 2

History
- Construction start: 1971
- Opened: 1974
- Replaces: Bridge Street Bridge (c. 1930-1974)

Location
- Interactive map of Blair Street Bridge

The Blair Street Bridge is a concrete and steel girder bridge carrying the Lyell Highway through the township of New Norfolk across the River Derwent in Tasmania, Australia. Serving as a vital transportation link in the township's infrastructure, the bridge features a single carriageway with separated shared-use pathways on both sides. Completed in 1974, it is the fourth bridge to be constructed at New Norfolk, with the development aimed at withstanding valley floods before the establishment of the Meadowbank weirs. (Note: The River Derwent severely flooded at New Norfolk on Saturday 23 April 1960. It was estimated this flood approximated a once in fifty year flood with a flow of 120,000 cusecs.)

== History ==
Generally known as the "New Norfolk Bridge", similarly placed bridges at New Norfolk have a rich history dating back to the early 19th century. The first wooden bridge constructed across the River Derwent at Bridge Street, near the contemporary Blair Street Bridge was completed in 1834. This bridge was a pivotal development, connecting New Norfolk with the surrounding regions for the first time, facilitating transportation and trade. It was built under the direction of Assistant Surveyor General William Sharland, who owned the 1825 property known as Woodbridge. A toll was collected for crossing the bridge, which was eventually abolished in July, 1880.

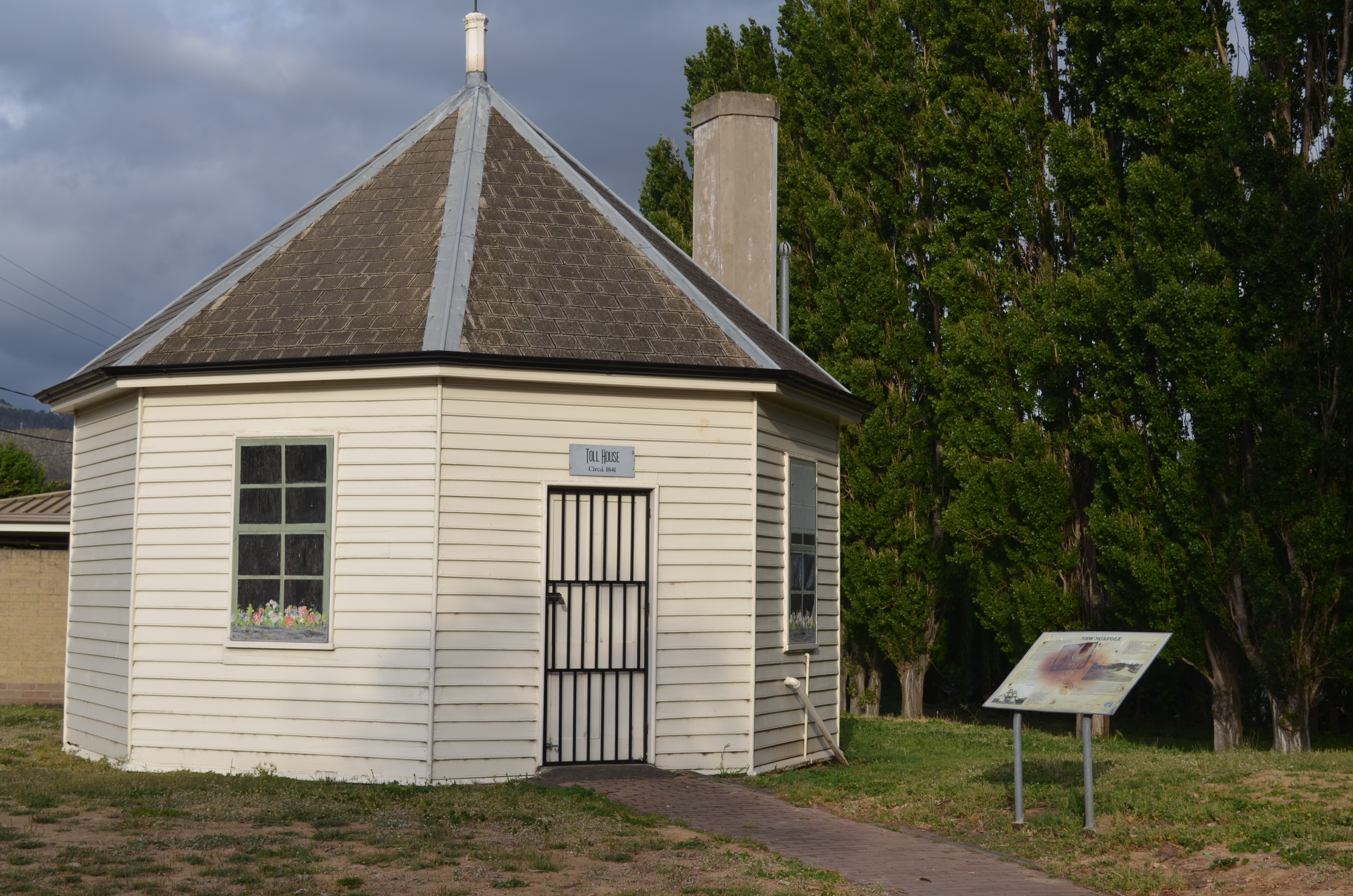
Constructed in 1841, the Toll House collected tolls until 1880.

The River Derwent is highly susceptible to flooding and over time, subsequent bridges in 1880 and 1931 were built near the same location. The remnants of the first three bridges, including materials from the original 1834 structure and the later Victorian dressed-sandstone of the second bridge, can still be observed near Woodbridge at the end of Bridge Street.

Before the construction of the Blair Street Bridge, the town of New Norfolk relied on an aging steel and concrete bridge built in 1931 to facilitate transportation across the River Derwent. However, this bridge had become increasingly inadequate to meet the growing demands of modern traffic, characterised by substandard strength, limited width, and a load limit of 15 tonnes (15 long tons; 17 short tons) imposed in 1966. Recognising the need for a more robust and efficient river crossing, plans were set in motion for the construction of a new bridge.

=== Construction ===
Construction began in August 1971 and finished within two and a half years at a cost of A$900,000. Timber falsework aided river pier access during construction. Foundations use spread footings for abutments and driven piles for piers, ensuring stability and minimising settlement risks. Design emphasises longitudinal and lateral stability for resilience against flooding and adverse weather. Aesthetic features, like minimalist balustrading and lighting, enhance the bridge's modernist appeal. Hydraulic engineers evaluated factors such as river flow rates, water levels, and floodplain characteristics to determine the bridge's susceptibility to inundation during periods of high water.

To minimise the risk of flooding impacting the bridge and its approaches, several design features were incorporated into the Blair Street Bridge project. These included raising the bridge deck to a predetermined elevation above anticipated flood levels, providing sufficient clearance for floodwaters to pass underneath without causing structural damage. Additionally, the bridge's abutments and piers were reinforced to withstand the hydraulic forces exerted by floodwaters.

The completed Blair Street Bridge measures 200 metres (650 ft) with six spans, each 35 metres (116 ft) long over the river. It features reinforced concrete slabs for stability and steel girders fabricated by Russell Allport & Co in Moonah. The bridge design includes a 4.74% graded slope, easing to a 3% vertical curve on Montagu Street, ensuring resilience to heavy loads and adverse weather.

== Significance ==
The completion of the Blair Street Bridge represented a significant upgrade in the town's infrastructure. The taller and reinforced concrete bridge successfully overcame the challenges posed by the river's tendency to flood.

== Sources ==
- New bridge over the Derwent River at New Norfolk, Department of Public Works Tasmania, 1970
