= Rosegarland, Tasmania =

Rosegarland Tasmania
- Coordinates: 42°42′28″S 146°56′45″E
- Population: 75 (2016 census)
- Postcode(s): 7140
- Location: 15 km (9 mi) NW of New Norfolk
- LGA(s): Derwent Valley
- Region: South-east
- State electorate(s): Lyons
- Federal division(s): Lyons
Localities around Rosegarland:
Macquarie Plains	Gretna	Black Hills
Macquarie Plains	Rosegarland	Black Hills, Hayes
Macquarie Plains	Plenty	Plenty

Rosegarland is a rural residential locality in the local government area of Derwent Valley in the South-east region of Tasmania. It is located about 15 kilometres (9.3 mi) north-west of the town of New Norfolk. The 2016 census determined a population of 75 for the state suburb of Rosegarland.

== History ==
Rosegarland was gazetted as a locality in 1959. Rose Garland was the name of property in the district in 1854, and the 'Rosegarland Inn' existed in 1877.

== Geography ==
The Derwent River forms the southern boundary.

== Road infrastructure ==
The Lyell Highway (A10) enters from the south-east and runs through to the north-west, where it exits. Route B61 (Gordon River Road) starts at an intersection with A10 on the northern boundary and runs away to the south-west.
