= Lawitta =

- Town
- Coordinates: 42°45′53″S 147°02′17″E
- Country: Australia
- State: Tasmania
- Region: South-east
- LGA: Derwent Valley
- Location: 4 km (2.5 mi) NW of New Norfolk

Government
  - State electorate: Lyons
  - Federal division: Lyons

Population
  - Total: 232 (2016 census)
- Postcode: 7140
Localities around Lawitta
Hayes	Magra, Black Hills	New Norfolk, Magra
Hayes	Lawitta	New Norfolk
New Norfolk, Glenfern	New Norfolk	New Norfolk

Lawitta is a rural locality in the local government area (LGA) of Derwent Valley in the South-east LGA region of Tasmania. The locality is about 4 kilometres (2.5 mi) north-west of the town of New Norfolk. The 2016 census recorded a population of 232 for the state suburb of Lawitta.

== History ==
Lawitta was gazetted as a locality in 1970.

== Geography ==
The Derwent River forms the south-western boundary. The Derwent Valley Railway line follows the southern and south-western boundaries.

== Road infrastructure ==
Route A10 (Lyell Highway) runs through from south-east to south-west.
