= Wellington Park, Tasmania =

Wellington Park
- Town
- Coordinates: 42°53′58″S 147°13′05″E
- Country: Australia
- State: Tasmania
- Region: South-east, Hobart
- LGA: Derwent Valley, Hobart, Glenorchy, Kingborough, Huon Valley
- Location: 20 km (12 mi) W of Hobart CBD

Government
  - State electorate: Lyons, Franklin, Clark
  - Federal division: Lyons, Franklin, Clark, Denison

Population
  - Total: 0 (SAL 2016)
- Postcode: 7054
Localities around Wellington Park
| Mount Lloyd | Lachlan, Molesworth, Collinsvale, Glenfern | Montrose |
| Mount Lloyd | Wellington Park | Glenorchy, Lenah Valley, South Hobart, Fern Tree |
| Mount Lloyd | Longley, Lower Longley, Mountain River, Crabtree, Judbury | Neika |

Wellington Park is a rural locality in the local government areas of Derwent Valley, Hobart, Glenorchy, Huon Valley and Kingborough in the South-east and Hobart regions of Tasmania. It is located about 20 kilometres (12 mi) west of the Hobart CBD.

== History ==
Wellington Park is a confirmed suburb/locality.

Both the 2016 census and 2021 census determined a population of nil for the state suburb of Wellington Park.

== Geography ==
Almost all of the boundaries consist of survey lines. Mount Wellington is within the locality.

== Road infrastructure ==
The C616 route (Pinnacle Road) enters from the east and follows a winding route to the summit of Mount Wellington, where it ends.
