= Plenty, Tasmania =

Plenty
- Town
- Coordinates: 42°44′26″S 146°57′09″E
- Country: Australia
- State: Tasmania
- Region: South-east
- LGA: Derwent Valley Council
- Location: 9 km (5.6 mi) NW of New Norfolk

Government
  - State electorate: Lyons
  - Federal division: Lyons

Population
  - Total: 93 (2016 census)
- Postcode: 7140
Localities around Plenty
Macquarie Plains	Rosegarland, Hayes	Lawitta
Bushy Park	Plenty	Lawitta
Moogara	Glenfern, Moogara	New Norfolk

Plenty is a rural locality in the local government area (LGA) of Derwent Valley in the South-east LGA region of Tasmania. The locality is about 9 kilometres (5.6 mi) north-west of the town of New Norfolk. The 2016 census recorded a population of 93 for the state suburb of Plenty. It is a small locality and the name of a tributary river on the south side of the River Derwent in the Derwent Valley.

Formerly the location of hop growing, and fishing for salmon trout (brown trout), it is now notable for the Salmon Ponds (the original 1864 Plenty river fish hatchery) and the Tasmanian Museum of Trout Fishing.

== History ==
Plenty was gazetted as a locality in 1959. River Plenty Post Office opened on 27 March 1869, was renamed Plenty in 1895 and closed in 1956. The town is notable as it was the location of the first introductions of brown trout outside their native range when in 1864, 300 of 1500 brown trout eggs from the River Itchen survived a four-month voyage from Falmouth, Cornwall to Melbourne on the sailing ship Norfolk. By 1866, 171 young brown trout were surviving in a Plenty river hatchery. Thirty-eight young trout were released in the river in 1866. By 1868, the Plenty River hosted a self-sustaining population of brown trout which became a brood source for continued introduction of brown trout into Australian and New Zealand rivers.

Atlantic salmon, although successfully reared in the Plenty river hatchery and introduced at the same time under the sponsorship of the Acclimatization Society of Victoria, failed to establish themselves in Tasmania or Australia.

== 2020 river contamination ==
In 2020, hazardous substances from local composting business Jenkins Hire were allegedly dumped into the nearby Plenty River, resulting in the death of over 100,000 fish. The company produces compost by mixing waste discarded from the Boyer Mill, the salmon farming industry, and treated sewage sludge from TasWater. Improper accumulation of waste without adequate drying can produce noxious leachate, contaminating surrounding soils. The company was consequently charged with intentional or reckless environmental pollution and improper storage of controlled waste with a foreseeable risk of environmental escape.

== Geography ==
The River Derwent forms the north-western and northern boundaries. The Plenty River forms a small part of the southern boundary before flowing through to the north.

== Road infrastructure ==
Route B62 (Glenora Road) runs through from north-east to west.

== Notes and references ==
- Dimmick, Leonard W. (2004) Fishes and men: the Jones family of Plenty, Tasmania Glenorchy, Tas. L.W. Dimmick. ISBN 0-9578153-2-8
