= Lonnavale, Tasmania =

Lonnavale Tasmania
- Coordinates: 42°57′55″S 146°50′39″E
- Population: 92 (2016 census)
- Postcode(s): 7109
- Location: 23 km (14 mi) W of Huonville
- LGA(s): Huon Valley
- Region: South-east
- State electorate(s): Franklin
- Federal division(s): Franklin
Localities around Lonnavale:
Southwest	Southwest, Moogara	Judbury, Mount Lloyd
Southwest	Lonnavale	Judbury
Southwest	Southwest	Judbury

Lonnavale is a rural locality in the local government area (LGA) of Huon Valley in the South-east LGA region of Tasmania. The locality is about 23 kilometres (14 mi) west of the town of Huonville. The 2016 census recorded a population of 92 for the state suburb of Lonnavale.

== History ==
Lonnavale was gazetted as a locality in 1976. “Lonna” is believed to be an Aboriginal word meaning “windpipe and stone”.

== Geography ==
The Huon River forms the south-eastern boundary.

== Road infrastructure ==
Route C619 (Glen Huon Road) passes to the east. From there, Lonnavale Road provides access to the locality.
