= Gretna, Tasmania =

Gretna
- Town
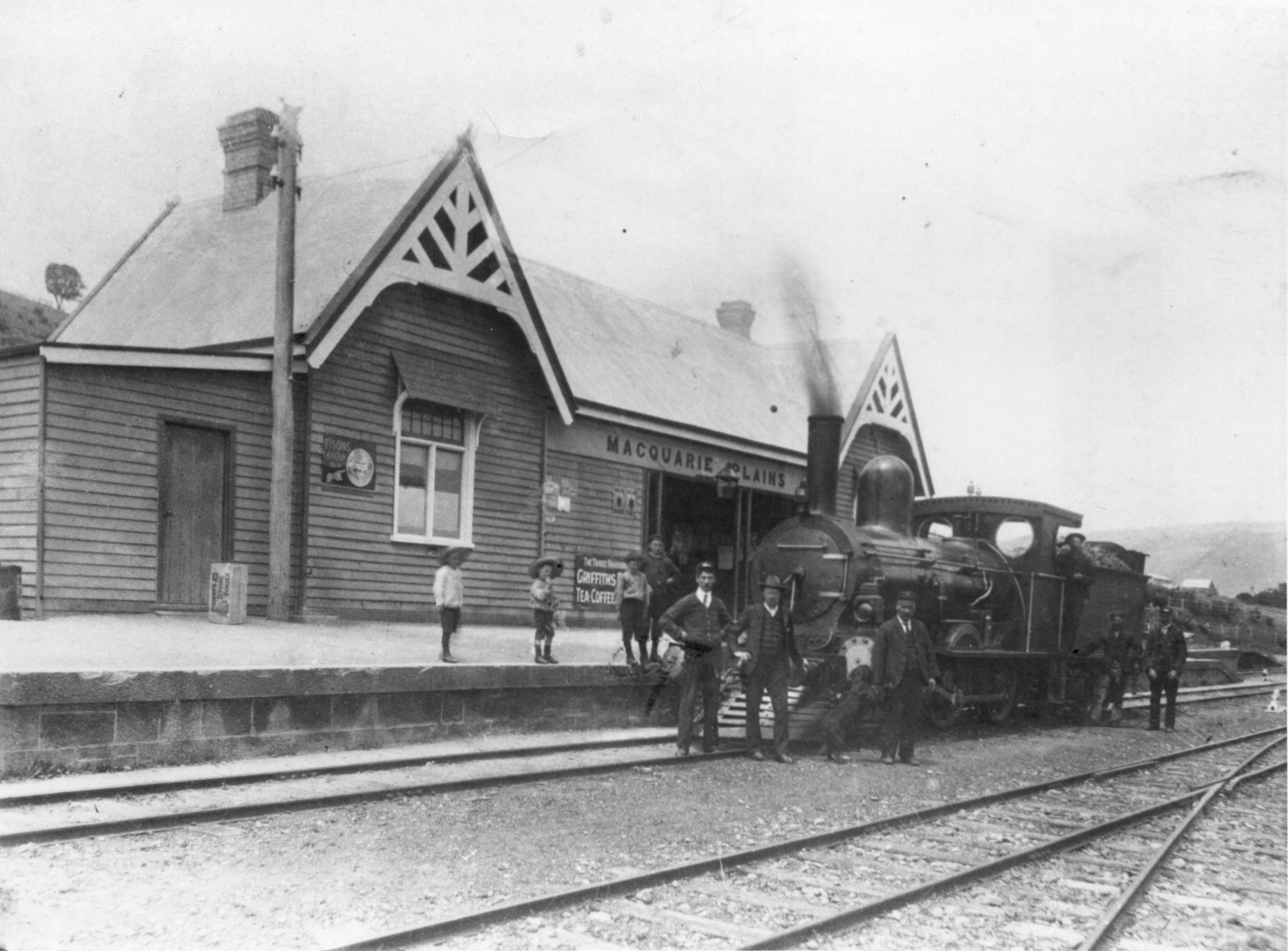
- B class locomotive at Macquarie Plains station

- Coordinates: 42°39′30″S 146°58′00″E
- Country: Australia
- State: Tasmania
- Region: Central, South-east
- LGA: Central Highlands, Derwent Valley
- Location: 20 km (12 mi) SE of Hamilton

Government
  - State electorate: Lyons
  - Federal division: Lyons

Population
  - Total: 211 (2016 census)
- Postcode: 7140
Localities around Gretna
Hamilton	Hamilton, Pelham	Elderslie
Meadowbank	Gretna	Elderslie, Broadmarsh, Black Hills
Glenora	Rosegarland, Macquarie Plains, Glenora	Black Hills

Gretna is a rural locality in the local government areas (LGA) of Central Highlands and Derwent Valley in the Central and South-east LGA regions of Tasmania. The locality is about 20 kilometres (12 mi) south-east of the town of Hamilton. The 2016 census recorded a population of 211 for the state suburb of Gretna. It was formerly known as Stony Hut Plains, though the Gretna post office was known as Macquarie Plains for many years. It has a postcode of 7140.

== History ==
Gretna was gazetted as a locality in 1959.

Macquarie Plains Post Office opened in 1932 and was renamed Gretna in 1907.

== Geography ==
The River Derwent forms the south-western and part of the southern boundaries of the locality. The A10 route (Lyell Highway) passes through from south to north-west, and two minor numbered routes branch from it. The C181 route (Marked Tree Road) runs north through the locality to meet the B110 route (Hollow Tree Road) in the locality of Hollow Tree, and the C183 route (Bluff Road) runs north-east to Elderslie.

== Landmarks ==
Gretna is the location of three heritage listed locations, all of which were listed on the Register of the National Estate before its removal and along with 5 other properties are on the Tasmanian Heritage Register to this day.

- St Mary the Virgin Anglican Church, the local church built in 1848.
- Glenelg House, designed by Henry Hunter and finished in 1878, built for the Downie family.
- Clarendon House, built by William Borrodaile Wilson in 1821.
