= Derwent Valley Council =

- Local government area
- Interactive map of Derwent Valley Council
- Coordinates: 42.8129°S 146.4227°E
- Country: Australia
- State: Tasmania
- Region: Upper River Derwent region
- Established: 2 April 1994
- Council seat: New Norfolk

Government
  - Mayor: Michelle Dracoulis
  - State electorate: Lyons
  - Federal division: Lyons

Area
  - Total: 4,108 km^{2} (1,586 sq mi)

Population
  - Total: 10,290 (2018)
  - Density: 2.5049/km^{2} (6.488/sq mi)
- Website: Derwent Valley Council
LGAs around Derwent Valley Council
| West Coast | Central Highlands | Southern Midlands |
| West Coast | Derwent Valley Council | Glenorchy |
| West Coast | Huon Valley | Kingborough |

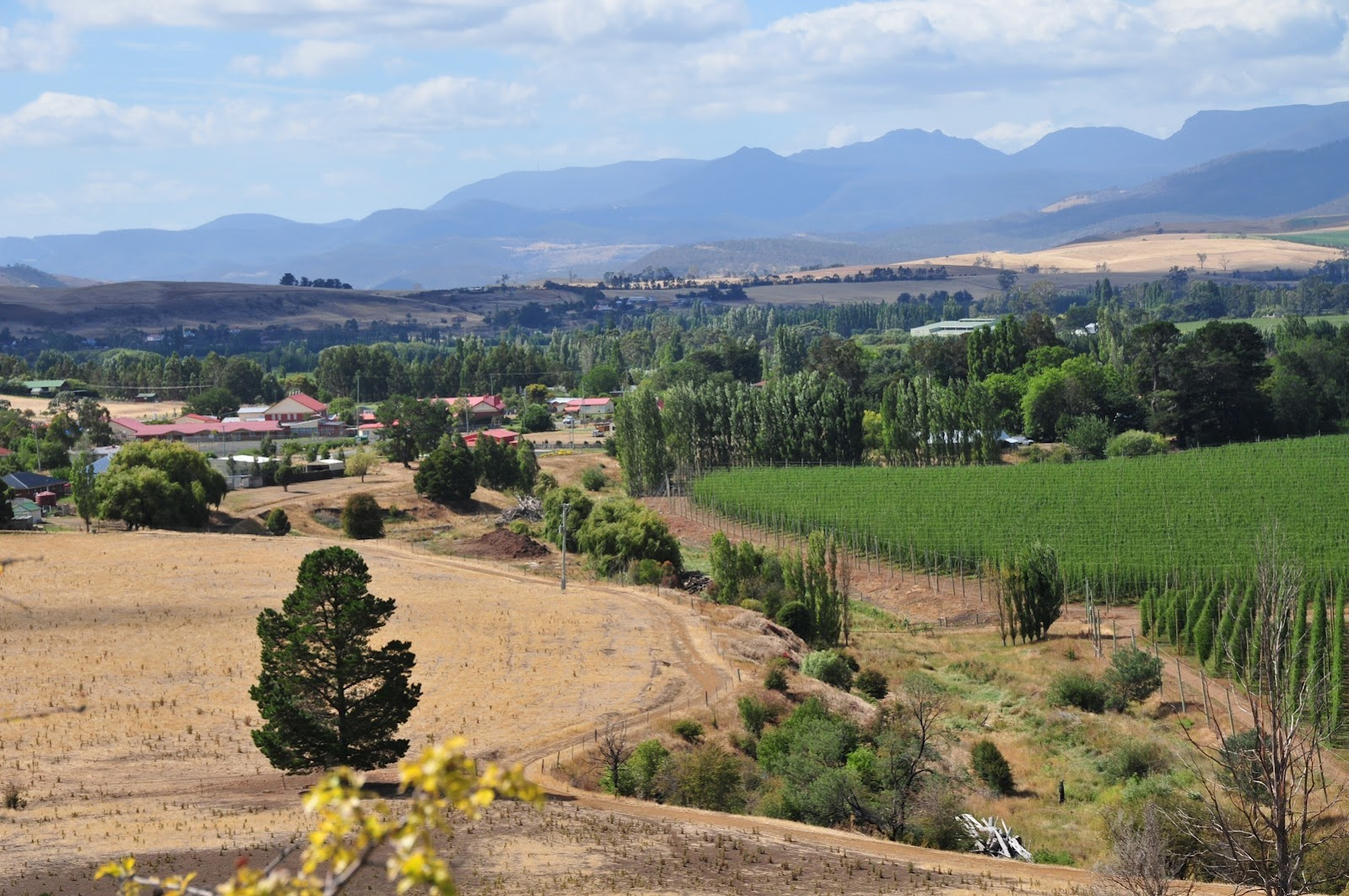
View over the Derwent Valley towards Hobart

Derwent Valley Council is a local government body situated in southern-central Tasmania, west of Hobart. Derwent Valley is classified as a rural local government area and has a population of 10,290, it includes the localities of Bushy Park, Maydena and Strathgordon, with New Norfolk the major, principal town.

== History and attributes ==
Derwent Valley was established on 2 April 1994, it was previously known as the New Norfolk Municipal Council. Derwent Valley is classified as rural, agricultural and large (RAL) under the Australian Classification of Local Governments.

The Tarn Shelf within Mount Field National Park is located within the region and is an area of significant botanic interest.

== Council ==
=== Current composition ===
The current logo replaced an older logo that depicted an oast house (a kiln for drying hops), trees and a roll of paper which are representative of major industries in the municipality.

The current Council was elected in 2022:

| Name | Position | Party affiliation |
|---|---|---|
| Michelle Dracoulis | Mayor/Councillor | Independent Labor |
| Luke Browning | Deputy Mayor/Councillor | Independent |
| Jessica Cosgrove | Councillor | Independent |
| Justin Derksen | Councillor | Independent Liberal |
| Matt Hill | Councillor | Independent |
| Peter Binny | Councillor | Independent Liberal |
| Phillip Bingley | Councillor | Independent |
| Sara Lowe | Councillor | Independent |

=== 2022 election results ===
2022 Tasmanian local elections: Derwent Valley
| Party | Candidate | Votes | % | ±% |
|---|---|---|---|---|
| Independent Labor | Michelle Dracoulis (elected) | 1,508 | 23.51 | |
| Independent | Luke Browning (elected) | 780 | 12.16 | |
| Independent | Jessica Cosgrove (elected) | 462 | 7.20 | |
| Independent Liberal | Peter Binny (elected) | 456 | 7.11 | |
| Independent | Phillip Bingley (elected) | 401 | 6.25 | |
| Independent Liberal | Justin Derksen (elected) | 397 | 6.19 | |
| Independent | Matt Hill (elected) | 334 | 5.21 | |
| Independent | James Graham | 302 | 4.71 | |
| Independent | Phillip Bigg | 295 | 4.60 | |
| Independent | Sara Lowe (elected) | 293 | 4.57 | |
| Greens | Heather Chaplin | 250 | 3.90 | |
| Independent | Wayne Shoobridge | 209 | 3.26 | |
| Independent | Brody Wiggins | 169 | 2.63 | |
| Independent | Natasha Woods | 138 | 2.15 | |
| Independent Labor | Deb Carnes | 122 | 1.90 | |
| Independent Labor | Liz Virtue | 121 | 1.89 | |
| Independent Labor | Brett Maryniak | 117 | 1.82 | |
| Independent | Eve Nelson | 60 | 0.94 | |
| Total formal votes | | 6,414 | 95.92 | |
| Informal votes | | 273 | 4.08 | |
| Turnout | | 6,687 | 80.10 | |
Party total votes
| Independent | | 3,443 | 53.68 | |
| Independent Labor | | 1,868 | 29.12 | |
| Independent Liberal | | 853 | 13.30 | |
| Greens | | 250 | 3.90 | |

== Localities ==
- Black Hills (part)
- Boyer (part)
- Broadmarsh (part)
- Bushy Park
- Claremont (part)
- Collinsvale (part)
- Fitzgerald
- Florentine (part)
- Glenfern
- Glenlusk (part)
- Glenora
- Granton (part)
- Gretna (part)
- Hayes
- Karanja
- Lachlan
- Lawitta
- Macquarie Plains
- Magra (part)
- Malbina
- Maydena
- Molesworth
- Moogara
- Mount Field (part)
- Mount Lloyd
- National Park (part)
- New Norfolk
- Plenty
- Rosegarland
- Sorell Creek
- Strathgordon
- Styx
- Tyenna
- Uxbridge
- Wellington Park (part)
- Westerway (part)

=== Not in above list ===
- Southwest (part)

== See also ==
- List of local government areas of Tasmania
