= Chigwell, Tasmania =

Chigwell
- Suburb
- Interactive map of Chigwell
- Coordinates: 42°48′40″S 147°14′32″E
- Country: Australia
- State: Tasmania
- Region: Hobart
- City: Hobart
- LGA: Glenorchy
- Location: 6 km (3.7 mi) NW of Glenorchy

Government
  - State electorate: Clark
  - Federal division: Clark

Population
  - Total: 2,050 (SAL 2021)
- Postcode: 7011
Suburbs around Chigwell
Claremont	Claremont	Claremont
Glenlusk	Chigwell	Berriedale
Glenlusk	Berriedale	Rosetta

Chigwell is a residential locality in the local government area (LGA) of Glenorchy in Greater Hobart, Tasmania. The locality is about 6 kilometres (3.7 mi) north-west of the town of Glenorchy.

It is a suburb in the 'northern suburbs' area of Hobart. The suburb is situated between the suburbs of Berriedale, Claremont and Glenlusk. The suburb shares its border with Berriedale along the Brooker Highway and the streets north of Berriedale Rd. Until the late 1990s, the suburb boundary was closer to the main road.

The suburb shares with adjacent suburbs a range of older houses and properties.

The area was originally made up of public housing, however much of the public housing stock has now been sold to private owners. The suburb is considered as a middle class socio-economic area, typical of many of the suburbs within Glenorchy City Council.

Chigwell primary school had its name changed to the Mt Faulkner primary school.

It is the location of the Metro Claremont home ground.

The word "Chigga" (a synonym of "bogan") appears to be a reference to the suburb.

== History ==
Chigwell was gazetted as a locality in 1956.

== Geography ==
Most of the boundaries are survey lines.

== Road infrastructure ==
National Route 1 (Brooker Highway) runs along the eastern boundary.
