= Molesworth, Tasmania =

Molesworth
- Town
- Coordinates: 42°48′28″S 147°08′55″E
- Country: Australia
- State: Tasmania
- Region: South-east
- LGA: Derwent Valley
- Location: 10 km (6.2 mi) SE of New Norfolk

Government
  - State electorate: Lyons
  - Federal division: Lyons

Population
  - Total: 633 (2016 census)
- Postcode: 7140
Localities around Molesworth
Lachlan	Sorell Creek, Malbina	Claremont
Lachlan	Molesworth	Glenlusk
Wellington Park	Wellington Park	Collinsvale

Molesworth is a rural residential locality in the local government area of Derwent Valley in the South-east region of Tasmania. It is located about 10 kilometres (6.2 mi) south-east of the town of New Norfolk. The 2016 census determined a population of 633 for the state suburb of Molesworth.

== History ==
Molesworth was gazetted as a locality in 1970.

== Geography ==
The boundaries of the locality are almost all survey lines.

== Road infrastructure ==
The C615 route (Molesworth Road) enters from the north-west and runs through to the south-east, where it exits.
