= Bushy Park, Tasmania =

Bushy Park Tasmania
- Coordinates: 42°42′49″S 146°53′31″E
- Population: 126 (2016 census)
- Postcode(s): 7140
- Location: 19 km (12 mi) NW of New Norfolk
- LGA(s): Derwent Valley
- Region: South-east
- State electorate(s): Lyons
- Federal division(s): Lyons
Localities around Bushy Park:
Westerway	Glenora	Glenora
Westerway	Bushy Park	Macquarie Plains
Uxbridge	Moogara, Uxbridge	Moogara

Bushy Park is a rural locality and town in the local government area of Derwent Valley in the South-east region of Tasmania. It is located about 19 kilometres (12 mi) north-west of the town of New Norfolk. The 2016 census determined a population of 126 for the state suburb of Bushy Park.

== History ==
Bushy Park was gazetted as a locality in 1959.

== Geography ==
The Styx River forms the western, northern and north-eastern boundaries, where it flows into the Derwent River, which then forms much of the eastern boundary.

== Road infrastructure ==
The B61 route (Gordon River Road) enters from the east and runs through via the town to the north, where it exits. Route B62 (Glenora Road) starts at an intersection with B62 and runs south and south-east until it exits. Route C610 (Uxbridge Road) starts at an intersection with B62 and runs south-west and south until it exits.

== Climate ==
Climate data for Bushy Park Estates
Month	Jan	Feb	Mar	Apr	May	Jun	Jul	Aug	Sep	Oct	Nov	Dec	Year
Record high °C (°F)	40.3 (104.5)	39.3 (102.7)	38.6 (101.5)	31.9 (89.4)	25.6 (78.1)	20.0 (68.0)	20.0 (68.0)	23.7 (74.7)	29.5 (85.1)	33.5 (92.3)	35.7 (96.3)	39.7 (103.5)	40.3 (104.5)
Mean daily maximum °C (°F)	24.1 (75.4)	24.0 (75.2)	21.9 (71.4)	18.0 (64.4)	14.4 (57.9)	11.4 (52.5)	11.3 (52.3)	13.2 (55.8)	15.5 (59.9)	17.8 (64.0)	20.0 (68.0)	22.2 (72.0)	17.8 (64.0)
Mean daily minimum °C (°F)	10.1 (50.2)	10.0 (50.0)	8.5 (47.3)	6.2 (43.2)	4.0 (39.2)	2.1 (35.8)	1.5 (34.7)	2.3 (36.1)	3.9 (39.0)	5.8 (42.4)	7.6 (45.7)	9.1 (48.4)	5.9 (42.6)
Record low °C (°F)	0.2 (32.4)	0.0 (32.0)	−1.8 (28.8)	−4.4 (24.1)	−6.0 (21.2)	−6.7 (19.9)	−5.5 (22.1)	−5.5 (22.1)	−3.7 (25.3)	−2.9 (26.8)	−1.3 (29.7)	−1.2 (29.8)	−6.7 (19.9)
Average precipitation mm (inches)	40.5 (1.59)	34.2 (1.35)	38.8 (1.53)	45.8 (1.80)	45.6 (1.80)	47.9 (1.89)	49.8 (1.96)	54.4 (2.14)	53.6 (2.11)	57.1 (2.25)	52.1 (2.05)	50.3 (1.98)	570.7 (22.47)
Average precipitation days	9.2	8.2	10.0	11.6	13.4	13.6	15.1	15.9	15.3	15.6	13.1	12.0	153.0
Average afternoon relative humidity (%)	43	46	49	57	65	72	70	61	55	53	51	45	56
