= New Norfolk =

Town in the Derwent Valley, Tasmania

New Norfolk Wulawali (Southeast Tasmanian)
- Town
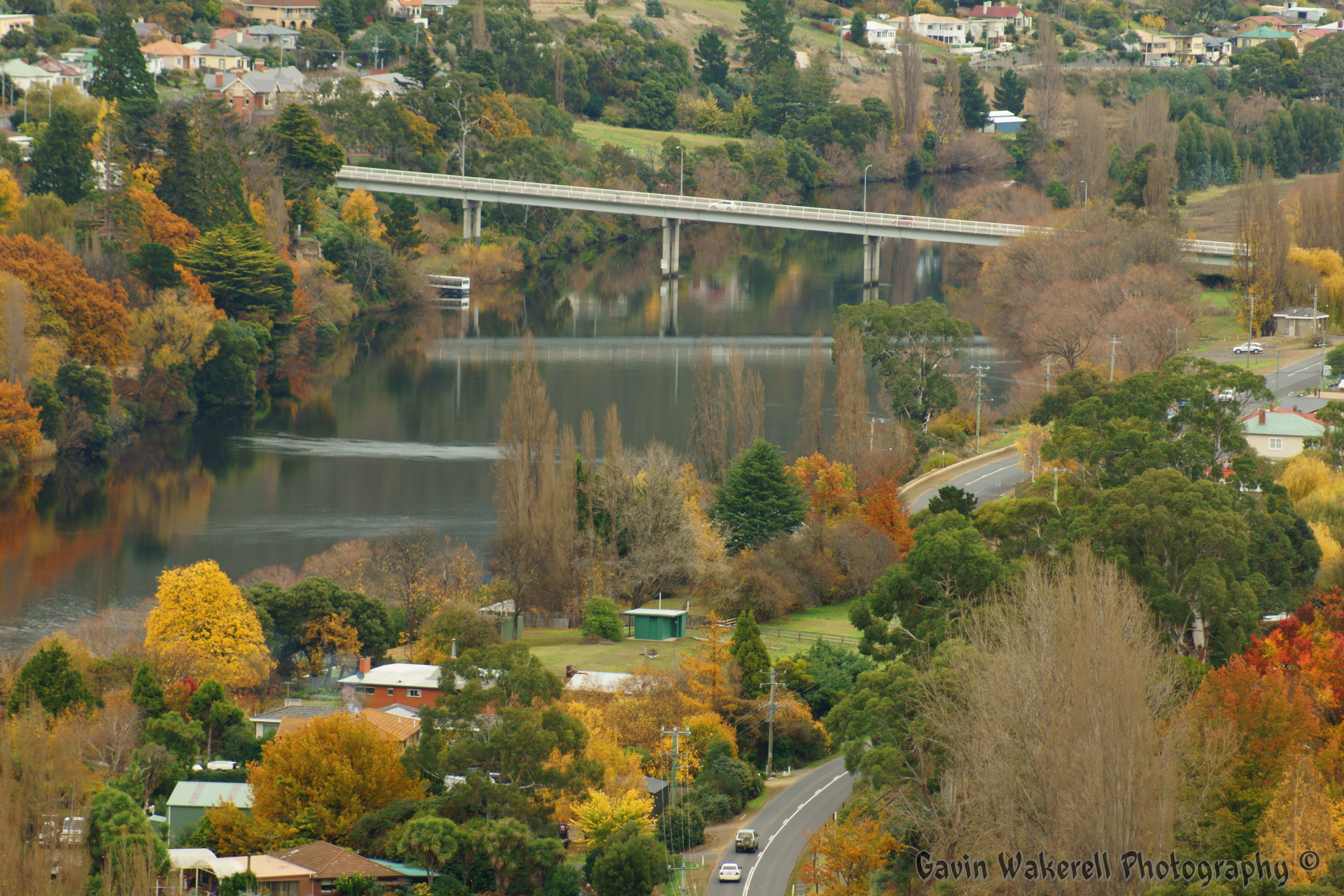
- New Norfolk's Blair Street Bridge and River Derwent in autumn, 2012

- Coordinates: 42°46′58″S 147°03′34″E
- Country: Australia
- State: Tasmania
- LGA: Derwent Valley Council
- Location: 32 km (20 mi) from Hobart; 38 km (24 mi) from Hamilton; 213 km (132 mi) from Queenstown
- Established: 1807

Government
  - State electorate: Lyons
  - Federal division: Lyons

Population
  - Total: 6,153 (2021 census)
- Postcode: 7140
- Mean max temp: 17.3 °C (63.1 °F)
- Mean min temp: 6.6 °C (43.9 °F)
- Annual rainfall: 551.1 mm (21.70 in)

New Norfolk (/njuːˈnɔːfək/ nyoo-NOR-fək; Leenowwenne/palawa kani: Wulawali) is a riverside town located on the River Derwent in southeastern Tasmania, Australia. Established in 1807, it is Tasmania’s fourth-oldest European settlement and ranks as the twelfth oldest in Australia. Initially founded by evacuees from Norfolk Island, New Norfolk has a population of 6,153 as of 2021 and serves as the main township of the Derwent Valley region. It lies 32 kilometres (20 mi) northwest of Hobart, along the Lyell Highway, and is encompassed within the Greater Hobart statistical area.

Historically, New Norfolk’s economy has been shaped by agriculture, especially hop farming, and the timber industry. Boyer Mill, a major paper producer, is now the sole manufacturer of newsprint, magazine, and book paper in Australia. Recent years have seen significant development in the area, including the $500 million residential and community project, The Mills.

Tourism has also grown as a key industry, with visitors attracted to the town's natural beauty and colonial heritage. Notable landmarks include St. Matthews Anglican Church, Tasmania’s oldest, and The Bush Inn, one of Australia’s oldest continuously operating hotels. Nearby attractions include the Salmon Ponds, established in 1861, which is the oldest trout hatchery in the Southern Hemisphere.

In August 2024, shipbuilder Incat announced plans to expand to a new site in Boyer to build battery-electric ferries, including the world’s largest electric ferry. This project is expected to create up to 1,000 jobs over the next decade, with construction beginning in 2026.

== History ==
The Leenowwenne people, among five Aboriginal tribes in the Big River district, inhabited the area that is present-day New Norfolk.

In 1793, explorer John Hayes led the first European exploration of the New Norfolk area, navigating the River Derwent aboard the Duke of Clarence and the Duchess of Bengal. When the river became too shallow for his vessels, Hayes rowed to a spot just upstream from the present site of New Norfolk.

=== Resettlement of Norfolk Islanders ===
Following the closure of the penal settlement on Norfolk Island, almost half the population of Norfolk Islanders were relocated to Van Diemen's Land. Between 29 November 1807 and 2 October 1808, 544 soldiers, convicts and free settlers were relocated to the settlement of present-day New Norfolk. Many of the free Norfolk Islanders were from farming families, offered land grants in Tasmania as compensation for their relocation.

The climate was colder than sub-tropical Norfolk Island, which proved a challenge for the hardy pioneers during the first few years, but eventually the district became self-supporting. In 1825 the original name of the town, Elizabeth Town, was changed to New Norfolk in honour of their former home.

Many founding folk were "First Fleeters", transferred from Sydney to Norfolk Island when it was settled just a few weeks after Sydney. Ten First Fleeters are buried in the Methodist Chapel at Lawitta, New Norfolk. Notable is Betty King, née Elizabeth Thackery, a first fleet convict girl who married at New Norfolk on 28 January 1810. The headstone on Betty's well-tended grave reads, "The first white woman to set foot in Australia" from the First Fleet at Sydney Cove. She is also believed to be the last surviving First Fleeter, male or female, when she died at 89 years of age on 7 August 1856. Her husband was Marine Private Samuel King of the First Marine Regiment, another First Fleeter who arrived aboard the warship "Sirius". Sam King was the last male "First Fleeter" to survive until 21 October 1849, aged 86 years. Nine other First Fleeters were Ellen Guy (née Wainright), James Bryan Cullen, William Dempsey, William Edmunds, William Foyle, Abraham Hand, Stephen Martin, John Ruglass, and Edward Westlake.

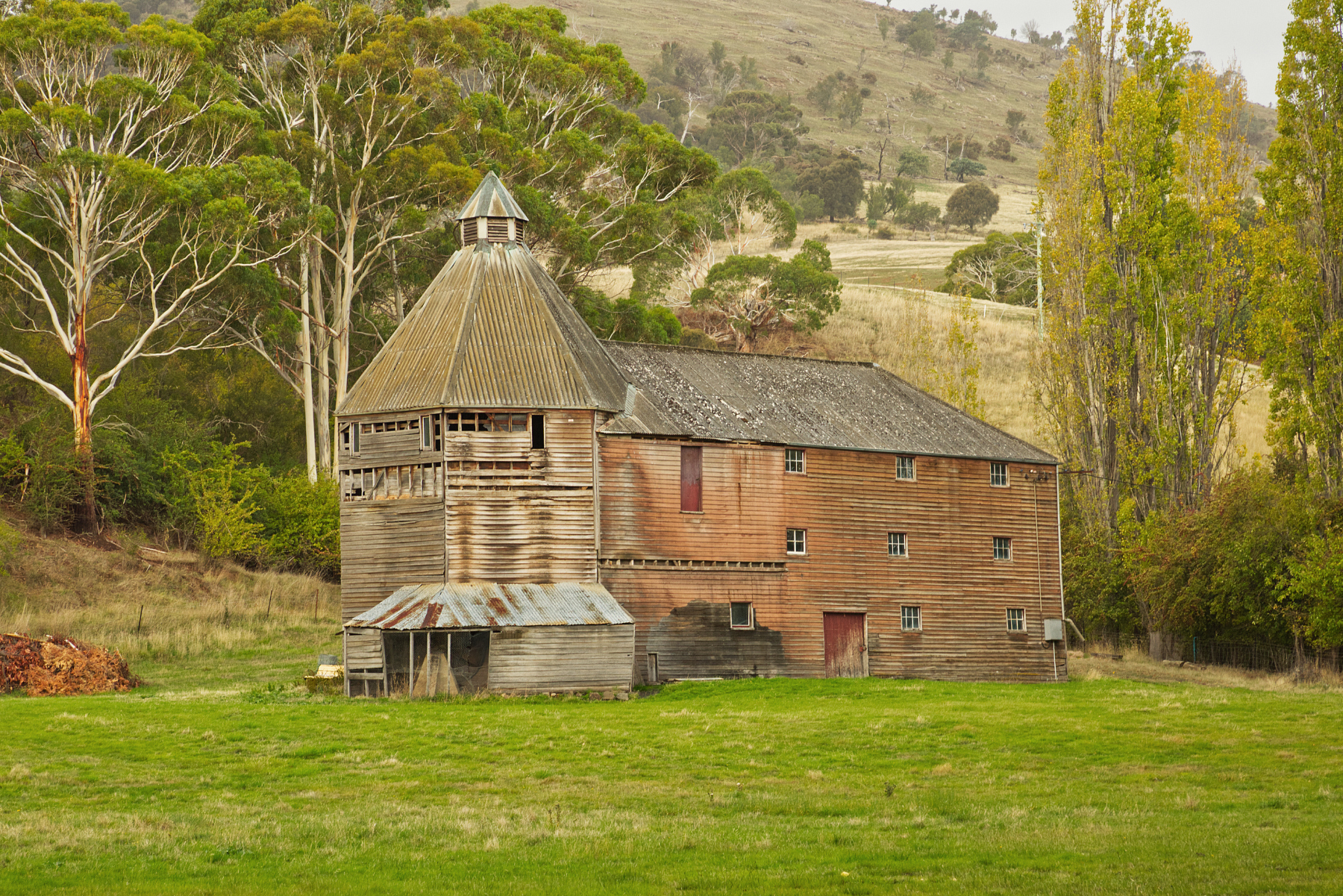
A former oast house used for the kilning of hops

The pioneers were successful farmers of the rich land around the town. Initially cattle and sheep were predominant, with some cropping as land was cleared. Hop plants were introduced in 1846, and became an important crop. A number of hop drying kilns or oast houses remain in the area including those at Glen Derwent (built by Cullen) and Valleyfield.

=== The Mapleys in New Norfolk ===
Richard Mapley (born 1810) of Great Linford moved to Tasmania in 1845, with his wife Fanny and children Joseph, Joshua, Jane, Sarah, Fanny, Mary Anne, Hannah and Thomas joining him in 1849.

They initially settled in Hobart, before moving to New Norwalk/Lachlan up the Derwent River 20 miles from Hobart. New Norfolk, the 3d. planned settlement in Tasmania, had been established in the early 1810's, also known as "The Hills" because of its hills, valleys and gentle streams. The stream "Thames" was renamed "Lachlan" after Governor Macquarie. Richard died there 2 years later in 1851, but his children populated the area to the extent that Mapley Road in Lachlan, 4 km. south of New Norfolk, is named after the early families.

=== First road in Van Diemen's Land ===
In March 1818, former convict Denis McCarty proposed the construction of a road connecting Hobart Town and New Norfolk to Lieutenant Governor Sorell. This initiative aimed to open up the valley district and facilitate swifter responses to bushranger activities. Initially, McCarty suggested rebuilding a 16-foot (4.9 m) carriage road from New Town to Austins Ferry, extending it to New Norfolk in exchange for a 2,000-acre (810 ha) land grant. McCarty sought compensation for the 546 pounds worth of goods lost during bushranger raids by securing the road construction contract. To undertake the project, he requested 15 convicts on government provisions for a year, eight bullocks with a cart, a sleeping tent, and road-making tools.

Although McCarty's initial offer was declined, Sorell later reconsidered and invited McCarty to submit a quote for a 24-foot (7.3 m) wide carriage road from Hobart Town to Austin's Ferry and a 16-foot (4.9 m) carriage road to the Falls in New Norfolk. Despite the absence of a formal contract, McCarty proceeded with three additional convicts and 500 imperial gallons (2,300 L; 600 US gal) of duty-free rum as compensation for the extra labor. The Hobart Town Gazette observed, 'On Wednesday last, Mr. Dennis McCarty commenced the undertaking, under an agreement with the Government, of opening a road from Hobart Town (via New-town and Austin's farm) to New Norfolk. As this road includes communication with the populous village of New-town and forms the initial ten miles (to the ferry) of the principal road to Port Dalrymple, it is expected to greatly benefit the settlement'.

By June 1819, McCarty reported the completion of the road and sought his reward. In response, Governor Sorell appointed a committee of officers, including Major Thomas Bell, Engineer and Inspector of Public Works, Thomas Archer, and George W. Evans, Deputy Surveyor, to survey and assess the road. The committee found the road in poor condition, lacking adequate drainage and culverts, containing numerous tree stumps, and featuring poorly constructed bridges deemed 'impassable for cattle or carts and even dangerous for single horses'.

=== Willow Court ===
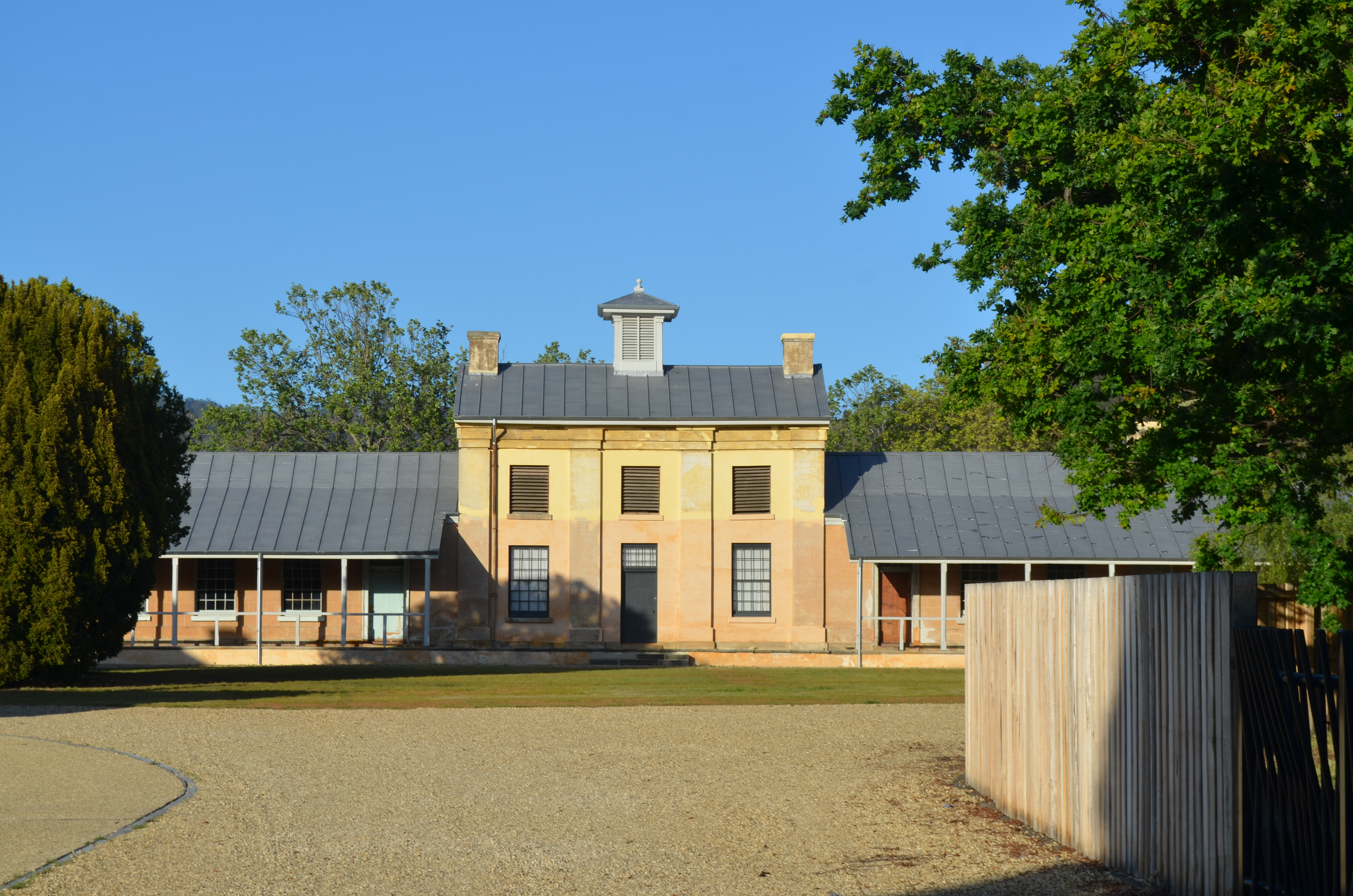
Willow Court in 2014

Willow Court, a notable site in New Norfolk, was established in 1827 by Governor George Arthur as an extension of the New Norfolk Asylum, making it one of Australia’s oldest mental health institutions. Initially constructed to house convicts deemed mentally ill, the facility later expanded its role to care for individuals with mental and intellectual disabilities.

The Willow Court compound played a significant role in Australia's mental health care system for over 170 years until its closure in 2000. The site has a complex history, marked by changing attitudes toward mental health care. Conditions at Willow Court, particularly in its earlier years, were often harsh, with patients subjected to outdated and inhumane treatments.

Situated outside the town's centre, Willow Court is bound by Humphrey Street to the west, George Street to the north, and the Avenue, as well as the southern-flowing Lachlan River, a branch of the River Derwent. The site features 23 buildings and landscape elements across approximately 18 hectares (44 acres). Architecturally, the site features a range of historical buildings, including the Barracks (the original building), which has been preserved. The complex also has later additions built in various architectural styles reflecting the evolving function of the institution. Willow Court operates as a large antiques centre and is home to the 2024 Gourmet Traveller Australian Restaurant of the Year award winner The Agrarian Kitchen Eatery and Cooking School, founded by Rodney Dunn and Severine Demanet. The Agrarian Kitchen establishment encompasses original buildings with a purpose built wing that houses the cooking school and transformed acres of walled yards from the asylum into a lush kitchen garden. Willow Court is regarded as a heritage site, with ongoing efforts to preserve and redevelop parts of it for tourism, community use, and historical interpretation.

The site’s history evokes mixed reactions, as it is a reminder of the darker aspects of mental health treatment but also offers a rich cultural and historical resource. Willow Court is also rumoured to be haunted, and its past has made it a focal point for ghost tours and paranormal investigations.

=== Terence MacManus ===
For some years after 1848, New Norfolk was the place of exile of the Irish nationalist leader Terence MacManus. His cottage "Kilburn Grange" still stands. Later he was joined by his fellow Irish rebel, William Smith O'Brien, who lived at Elwin's Hotel (now known as Glen Derwent).

=== Derwent Valley Railway ===
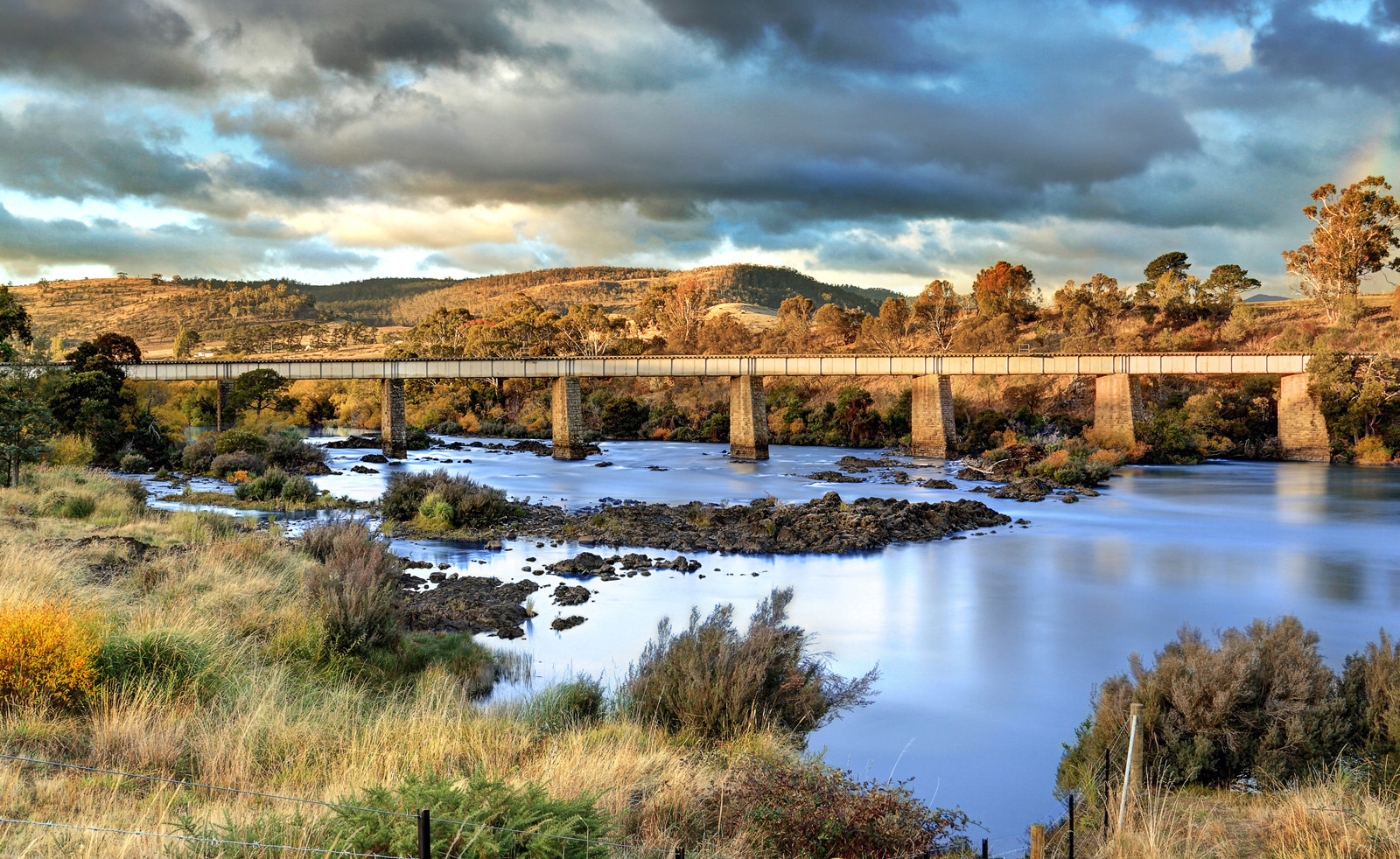
Railway bridge near New Norfolk

The Derwent Valley Railway, a heritage narrow-gauge railway based in New Norfolk, Tasmania, was originally opened by Tasmanian Government Railways in 1887. The line, initially 18 km from Bridgewater to New Norfolk, was extended multiple times, eventually reaching 74 km to Kallista by 1936, primarily serving rural and logging areas. Traffic increased significantly in 1940 with the opening of the Boyer paper mill.

After sections of the line began closing in the mid-20th century, floods in 1995 led to the line’s closure beyond New Norfolk. The Derwent Valley Railway Preservation Society, formed in 1990, reopened parts of the line for heritage passenger trains until 2005, when Pacific National halted operations. The society is currently negotiating to restore tourist train services.

=== Plaza Theatre ===
In 1932, Mrs. R. M. Hall built the Plaza Theatre on the corner of High and Charles Streets, New Norfolk, for £A2,200. Her late husband, Mr. P. Hall, had initiated regular film screenings in the area 24 years earlier. After his death, Mrs. Hall continued the business, introducing sound films. Designed by Hobart architects Rodway and Butler, the brick theatre featured a cantilever verandah and replaced a fifty-year-old wooden structure. The theatre was officially opened by Mr. T. Andrews on 9 December 1932.

Originally seating 500 to 600 people, including 165 in the gallery, the theatre's raked floor provided clear views of the stage, and it was equipped with advanced sound and cinematograph technology. Renovations in 1940 increased seating capacity to 650, but by 1971, it was reduced to 250, with only balcony seating in use. In March 1986, a new projection box was added, along with a side entrance to the auditorium, while the rear stalls and foyer were converted for retail use. By 2016, the building had become a Terry White Chemist.

=== Boyer Mill ===
The Boyer Mill, established at nearby Boyer, is a significant industrial site that has played a major role in the region's economy since its opening in 1941. The mill primarily produces newsprint and other publication-grade paper. It is notable for being the first mill in the southern hemisphere to manufacture paper from plantation-grown radiata pine, which marked a shift towards using more sustainable, locally sourced raw materials.

Boyer's establishment contributed to Tasmania’s industrial growth and provided employment opportunities for the surrounding communities. Over the decades, it has adapted to changes in the paper industry, including modernisation efforts to improve efficiency and environmental sustainability. The mill has been integral in supplying paper for newspapers across Australia and the Asia-Pacific region.

Despite challenges posed by the decline in print media, Boyer continues to operate, focusing on innovation and maintaining its role as a key economic driver in the Derwent Valley. The mill also plays a part in the region's broader vision to develop new industries, such as renewable energy and advanced manufacturing, to ensure long-term sustainability.

== Tourism ==
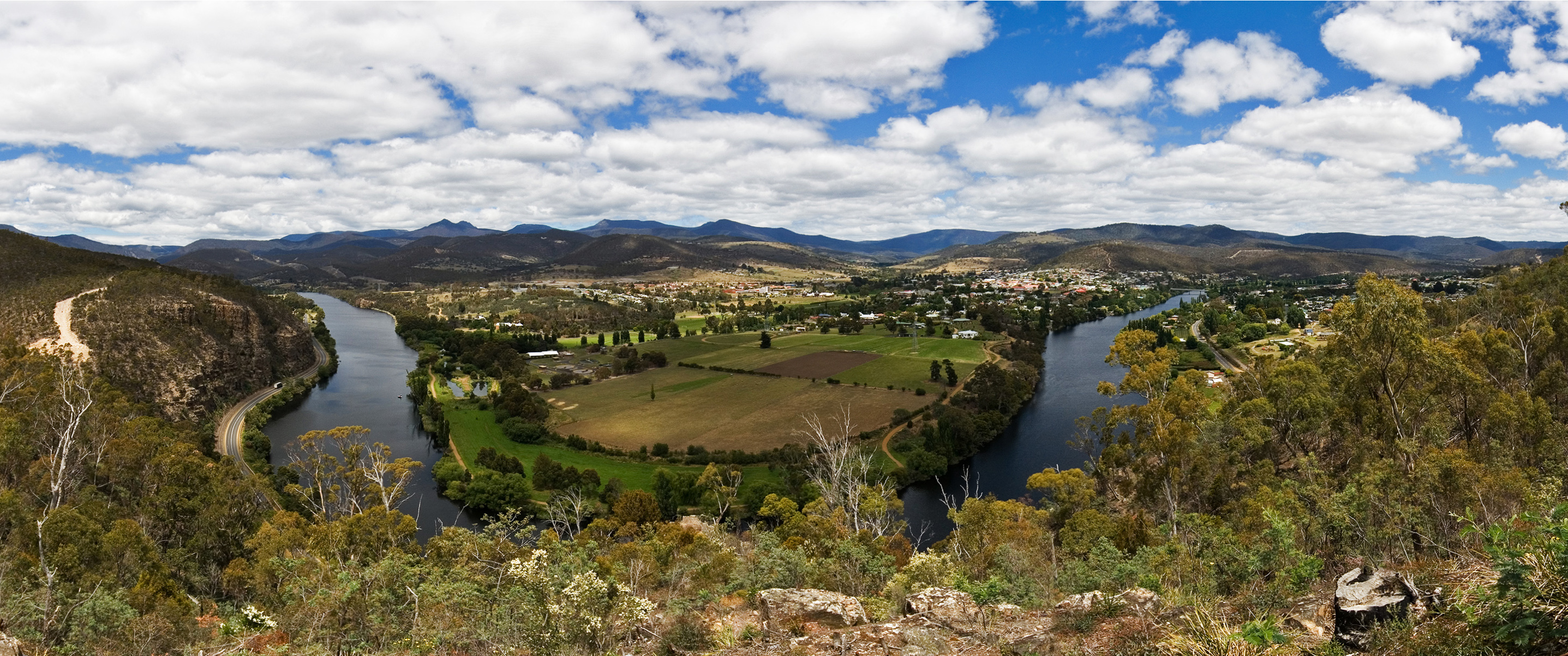
New Norfolk from Pulpit Rock lookout

New Norfolk is a central tourism hub in the upper Derwent Valley, offering easy access to nearby attractions like Mount Field, Lake Pedder, Strathgordon, Gordon Dam hydroelectric site, and the South West Wilderness. The town's Tourist Information Centre, staffed by volunteers, is located on Circle Street, adjacent to the Council Chambers.

In 2021, New Norfolk won the "Top Tourism Town" award from the Tourism Industry Council Tasmania, spotlighting its reputation as a growing destination. The town is also known for its premium wine and produce, with The Agrarian Kitchen being named Restaurant of the Year at the 2024 Gourmet Traveller Restaurant Awards—the first Tasmanian venue to receive the honour in the event’s 45-year history.

Historical properties like Glen Derwent and Tynwald have been repurposed as bed-and-breakfast accommodations, tea rooms, restaurants, and wedding venues, adding to the town's appeal. Notable historic residences, such as Glen Derwent, Stanton, and Valleyfield, remain intact and contribute to the town’s charm. Woodbridge on the Derwent, a heritage-listed Georgian mansion built in 1825, now operates as a luxury hotel, attracting international guests despite its location near a busy highway. The mansion was originally constructed by convicts for Captain Roadknight, the first Constable of what was then Elizabeth Town, before passing to William Sharland, the assistant surveyor of Van Diemen's Land. Sharland built the first wooden bridge across the Derwent near Woodbridge, with the original Tollhouse by the Blair Street Bridge still standing as a historical reminder.

New Norfolk is also known as the self-proclaimed "antiques capital of Tasmania," with numerous antique shops, including a large complex in the historic Willow Court precinct. This blend of natural beauty, history, and premium offerings has made New Norfolk a growing centre of tourism in Tasmania.

== Demographics ==
Historical population
Year	Pop.	±%
2001	5,009	—
2006	5,230	+4.4%
2011	5,543	+6.0%
2016	5,834	+5.2%
2021	6,153	+5.5%
Source: Australian Bureau of Statistics census data.

New Norfolk’s demographics highlight its status as a typical Tasmanian regional town, with a predominantly older, working-class population engaged in traditional industries, and a relatively affordable cost of living compared to Hobart.

New Norfolk’s urban centre had a population of approximately 6,153 at the 2021 census. Including the surrounding suburbs and rural areas, classified as Statistical Areas Level 2 (SA2s), the broader population representing the greater community totals 7,293 residents. The majority of residents are of English (41.1%) and Australian (36.2%) ancestry. 6.2% of New Norfolk’s population identifies as Aboriginal Australians or Torres Strait Islander. Nationally, this figure was 3.2%, meaning New Norfolk has a higher proportion of Indigenous residents compared to the Australian average, which reflects broader regional trends where Indigenous populations tend to be more concentrated in certain rural and regional areas than in major cities.

Nearly half (47.6%) report no religious affiliation, while Anglicanism remains a common religion (16.5%). The median age in New Norfolk is 40, higher than the national median of 38, indicating a generally older population. A significant portion of the population is over 55 years, reflecting a trend common in many regional Tasmanian towns.

In the 2021 Census, New Norfolk's median weekly household income was $1,107. This figure is lower than the national median of $1,746, reflecting the town's regional economy, where incomes tend to be lower compared to urban centres. The lower income levels are likely influenced by the dominant local industries, including agriculture, forestry, and retail, which typically offer lower wages than professional and technical fields more common in cities. New Norfolk's unemployment rate sat at 6.8%, which is slightly higher than the national unemployment rate of 5.1%.

Home ownership rates in New Norfolk are higher than in major cities, with affordable property prices attracting families and retirees. The median house price is considerably lower than in Hobart, making it an attractive option for those seeking more affordable living conditions. The town has several local schools providing primary and secondary education, but there is a tendency for students to commute to Hobart for higher education or more specialised schooling.

== Climate ==
New Norfolk is the warmest area of Tasmania during summer afternoons and has a cool temperate oceanic climate that is classified as Cfb under Köppen Climate Classification.

Climate data for New Norfolk, 1965-1983
Month	Jan	Feb	Mar	Apr	May	Jun	Jul	Aug	Sep	Oct	Nov	Dec	Year
Record high °C (°F)	39.4 (102.9)	39.4 (102.9)	37.8 (100.0)	29.0 (84.2)	23.8 (74.8)	19.6 (67.3)	20.0 (68.0)	23.1 (73.6)	27.6 (81.7)	31.1 (88.0)	36.1 (97.0)	37.2 (99.0)	39.4 (102.9)
Mean daily maximum °C (°F)	25.2 (77.4)	25.0 (77.0)	22.2 (72.0)	18.3 (64.9)	14.2 (57.6)	11.0 (51.8)	9.9 (49.8)	10.9 (51.6)	14.5 (58.1)	17.6 (63.7)	19.3 (66.7)	22.7 (72.9)	17.3 (63.1)
Mean daily minimum °C (°F)	10.8 (51.4)	11.3 (52.3)	9.5 (49.1)	7.0 (44.6)	4.4 (39.9)	2.1 (35.8)	1.3 (34.3)	2.2 (36.0)	4.5 (40.1)	6.2 (43.2)	8.2 (46.8)	9.8 (49.6)	6.6 (43.9)
Record low °C (°F)	−1.2 (29.8)	2.0 (35.6)	0.3 (32.5)	−1.0 (30.2)	−3.4 (25.9)	−5.7 (21.7)	−4.0 (24.8)	−2.8 (27.0)	−3.0 (26.6)	−1.5 (29.3)	0.0 (32.0)	1.2 (34.2)	−5.7 (21.7)
Average precipitation mm (inches)	39.8 (1.57)	34.6 (1.36)	38.7 (1.52)	47.6 (1.87)	44.0 (1.73)	48.6 (1.91)	48.4 (1.91)	46.6 (1.83)	49.0 (1.93)	55.0 (2.17)	47.2 (1.86)	49.6 (1.95)	551.1 (21.70)
Average precipitation days	8.0	6.8	8.8	10.1	11.1	12.0	13.0	13.9	13.2	13.8	12.0	10.8	133.5

== Access ==
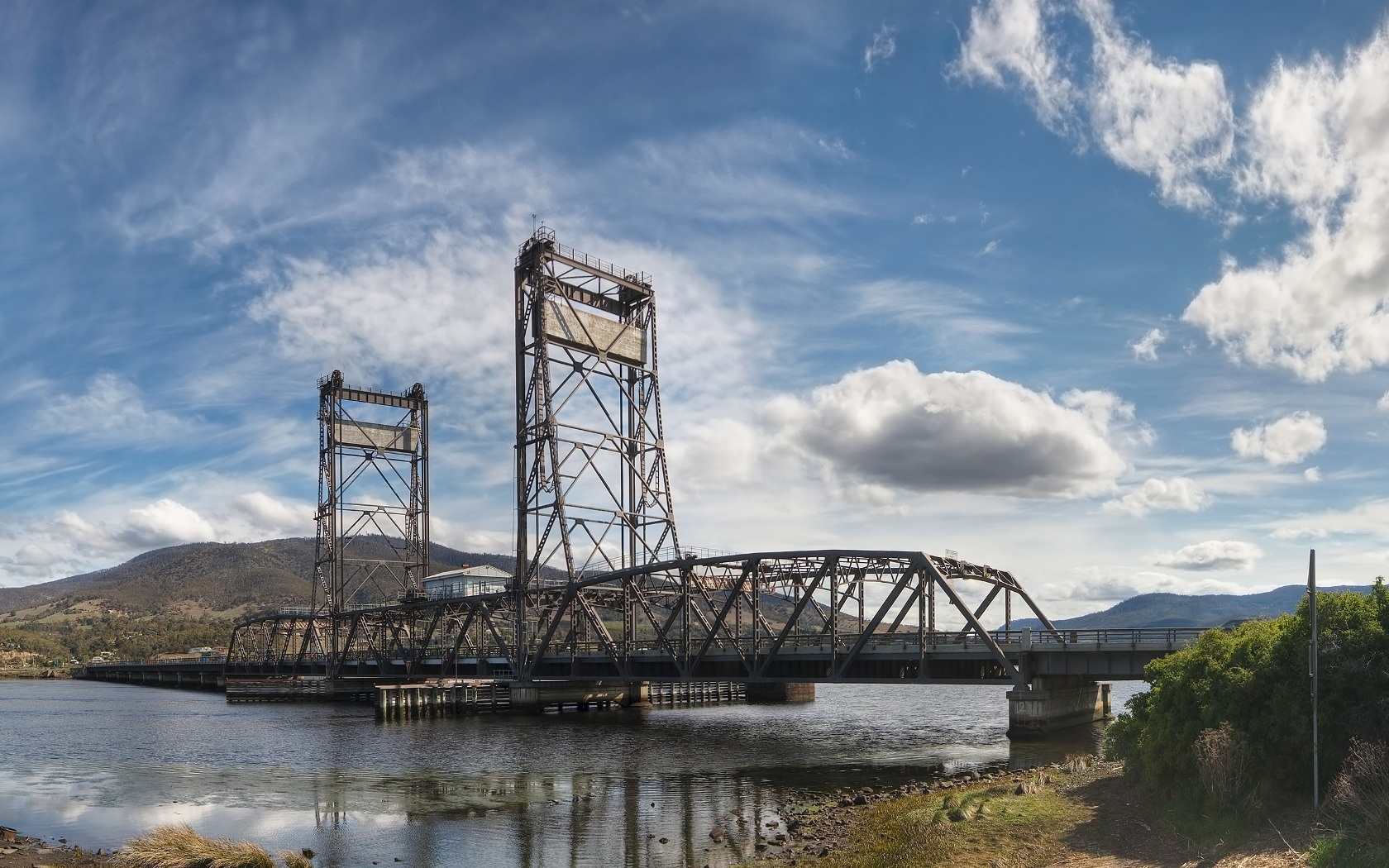
The Bridgewater Bridge was regularly lifted until 1984

New Norfolk is situated on the Lyell Highway, the primary east-west route in southern Tasmania, connecting Hobart to Strahan on the West Coast. As the sole major east-west highway in southern Tasmania, the Lyell Highway plays a central role in linking New Norfolk with other parts of the island. The town is approximately 55 kilometres (34 mi) from Hobart Airport and well-connected with regular bus routes operated by Metro Tasmania.

Historically, New Norfolk was served by passenger rail, freight rail and barge services along the River Derwent. The town was a key point on the Tasmanian Government Railways network, with the former branch line extending from the Main Line at Boyer to New Norfolk. The Bridgewater Bridge served as an important transportation marker, routinely used by the Australian Newsprint Mills to transport paper via water on barges to Hobart until 1984, when river transportation ceased.

In 2025, a new Bridgewater Bridge was completed, with a clearance height of 16 m (52.5 ft) - allowing marine traffic to flow freely from Hobart to New Norfolk for the first time in 170 years.

== See also ==
- Derwent Valley Council
- Derwent Valley Railway (Tasmania)
- New Norfolk District Football Club
- New Norfolk High School
- Norfolk Island
- Royal Derwent Hospital

== Sources ==
- Curtain, G.F. (1968), Relative events and a salute to the builder of the Hobart-New Norfolk road begun by Dennis McCarty, National Trust of Australia (Tasmania).
- Cowburn, Joe; Cox, Rita (1985), New Norfolk's history and achievements, New Norfolk Council's Bicentennial Community Committee, ISBN 1862523037
- Thompson, J. (2004), A Road in Van Diemen's Land, Department of Infrastructure, Energy and Resources, Tasmania.
- Von Stieglitz, K. R. (1961), A history of New Norfolk and the Derwent Valley
