= Railway accidents in Tasmania =

List of railway accidents in Tasmania

The rail transport in the island state of Tasmania, Australia has had many train accidents since its historic opening in 1871. The following is a list of train related accidents that have occurred on Tasmania's rail network.

== Fatal accidents ==
=== Campbell Town, 1874 ===
On 17 October 1874, a stonemason aged about 35 years was fatally injured when he was struck by the step of a ballast engine fracturing his skull. The man was asleep on the railway line approximately 4.8 km (3 miles) from Campbell Town and presumably raised his head as the truck passed him. The man who was originally from Alloa in Scotland died from his injuries in the Campbell Town hospital seven days later.

=== Campania, 1875 ===
On 20 January 1875 at 11:00am, a 25 year old workman received severe injuries to his legs when a train engine with nine trucks and a tender laden with rails and sleepers lost control and ran off the rails on the Main Line about 3.2 km (2 miles) from Campania. It was the man's first day of employment on the railways. The other men on the trucks jumped clear of the train except for the injured man who was in the tender filled with rails and another man in the rear truck who was uninjured. Four other men were injured as a result of the accident. The engine brakes failed as the train was travelling down an incline. The man died from blood poisoning as a result of his injuries 67 days later.

=== Campania, 1875 ===
On 23 March 1875, a railway employee aged about 44 years was killed while acting as a guard on a train travelling on the Main Line from the Jordan River to Campania. The train was loaded with ballast when the engine lost control whilst descending on an inclined curve due to grease being on the rails. A coupling bar broke spilling ballast into the tracks causing the wagons to run off the line. The man was thrown from the second last wagon and killed.

=== Campania, 1875 ===
On 13 April 1875, an inspector of the permanent way was killed when he was thrown from a wagon that toppled over a bank and was crushed. The train of six wagons laden with sleepers had left Bridgewater for Campania. The brakes were applied prior to descending an incline near Campania but the brakes failed to act due to the dampness of the rails and the train derailed when rushing around a sharp curve. The train guard was also thrown out but received only minor injuries. This was the third fatality to occur in the same location in three months. Both the inspector and train guard were on the train involved in the first of those fatal accidents on 20 January 1875.

=== Rosetta, 1877 ===
On 31 March 1877 at 8:15am, a woman aged about 60 years was killed when she was struck by the cow-catcher of the express train as it approached Rosetta Cottage crossing near O’Brien's Bridge. The woman was carried along the rails and thrown off the track. The express was travelling on the Main Line from Hobart when the accident occurred.

=== Rhyndaston, 1877 ===
On 9 April 1877, a man was killed when he fell from a trolley that he was operating on the Main Line at Flat Top.

=== Montrose, 1877 ===
On 10 November 1877, a woman aged about 65 years was killed when she was struck by a train on the Main Line sometime in the evening. The woman was last seen alive when she got out of the Hobart train at O’Brien's Bridge station at 5:20pm very much under the influence of drink. Her body was discovered at 8:30am the following day 160 m (170 yards) from the station.

=== Hobart, 1878 ===
On 13 February 1878 at approximately 5:00pm, a 14-year-old boy was fatally injured when he was run over after falling onto the rail tracks between two wagons that were being pulled by a train on the Main Line. The boy was returning to Hobart from the first day of the Elwick races seated in an open wagon. The accident occurred on the approach to the Hobart railway station near the slaughter yards. The boy claimed to have been pushed off the wagon by a man although it was highly likely that he was bumped by another passenger when the train suddenly jerked coming into the station. The boy was transferred to the General Hospital but died from his injuries very soon after arrival.

=== Brighton, 1878 ===
On 7 August 1878 at approximately 6:00pm, a gauger from Brighton Plains employed on the Main Line Railway was seriously injured while in charge of a trolley on the Main Line approximately 280 m (14 chains) from Jordan Bridge. The man and two other railway employees were returning home on the trolley down an incline when a wooden sleeper that was being carried fell and caught in the front wheel of the trolley. The two front wheels and axle separated from the body of the truck, the man was thrown onto the rails, and the flange of a trolley wheel passed over his abdomen. The man died from peritonitis at approximately 5:00pm the following day.

=== Evandale, 1878 ===
On 19 September 1878, a coachbuilder from Launceston was fatally injured while attempting to jump on the express train to Hobart at the Evandale station while it was starting in motion. The man was thrown off his feet by the motion of the train and fell between the carriages. The wheels of two carriages and a van passed over him severing his legs. The man died from his injuries 20 minutes later.

=== Launceston, 1878 ===
On 19 December 1878 at approximately 8:10am, a 28 year old engine cleaner was killed while cleaning the mail train from Hobart Town at the Launceston station on the Main Line. The man was in the pit of the turntable under the engine coupling it with the tender. The man then attempted to exit the pit by crawling out between the hind wheel of the engine and the front wheel of the tender when the engine suddenly moved backwards crushing him on the iron rail.

=== Exton, 1885 ===
On 6 April 1885 at approximately 7:16pm, an overseer aged about 48 years and his horse were killed by the Launceston to Deloraine down train midway between Exton and Deloraine. It was surmised that the man fell asleep on the horse while drunk and that by some unknown means the horse entered the railway gates, and while walking uncontrolled along the Launceston & Western Railway line was overtaken by the train and run over.

=== Deloraine, 1886 ===
On 17 March 1886 at approximately 8:49am, a 73-year-old man from Arms-of-Creek was killed when he was run over by a train travelling along the Western Railway from the Mersey. The man was heading towards the river bank when he crossed the railway line about 180 m (200 yards) from the Roman Catholic church in Deloraine.

=== Brighton, 1886 ===
On 29 June 1886 at 10:27pm, a special excursion train on the Main Line returning with visitors that attended the opening ceremony of the Fingal Railway ran off the rails while turning the six chain curves between Campania and Brighton. Train driver John Bradshaw and fireman Joseph Rogers were killed when they were thrown from the engine and the tender landed upon them. Among the injured passengers were the Tasmanian Premier, Dr. James W. Agnew, the Attorney-General John S. Dodds, and the Treasurer William H. Burgess.

=== Avoca, 1886 ===
On 13 July 1886 at approximately 3:35pm, the company manager of the Fingal Line was killed when a ballast engine with a long string of trucks ran off the rails at the points on the Fingal side of the Avoca train station. It was supposed that the man slipped while jumping off the engine and the wheel of the truck passed over his head killing him instantly. Another man and his wife who were in an overturned truck were also injured. There were approximately 40 people on the train at the time but no one else was injured.

=== Bridgewater, 1886 ===
On 22 July 1886, an express train on the Main Line from Launceston to Hobart overturned whilst crossing the viaduct at Bridgewater after the unsecured swing bridge opened. The accident resulted in the drowning deaths of fireman William Shaw and second class passenger Daniel Turner.

=== Perth, 1887 ===
On 23 June 1887 at approximately 7:00am, the body of a middle aged man was found in a table drain alongside the railway line at Jordan's Cutting 0.80 km (0.5 miles) on the Evandale side of Perth. It was surmised that the man was struck in the head by the cow-catcher of the 4:30pm up train, dragged a short distance, and then thrown into the drain.

=== Launceston, 1888 ===
On 19 January 1888 at approximately 4:50pm, a 12-year-old boy was killed when he was run over by a ballast train leaving the Launceston & Western Line railway station on the Scottsdale line near Evans's soap works in Launceston. The boy was in the company of two other boys when he attempted to run across the line when the trucks struck him.

=== Perth, 1888 ===
On 30 January 1888 at approximately 1:30pm, a porter aged about 19 years was killed while unhooking some wagons at the Perth railway station. The young man had got under the buffer before the train from Launceston had come to a complete standstill and he was either knocked down or fell on to the rails and was run over.

=== Antill Ponds, 1888 ===
On 4 September 1888, a young ganger from Glenorchy was killed on the Main Line south of Antill Ponds. The man had walked up the line towards Tin Dish to examine the fishplates and bolts which connect the rails when a train came around a curve and he was struck on the head by the cow-catcher. It was surmised that the man must have been stooping down screwing up a nut when the collision occurred. The wind was blowing very hard at the time and this may account for his not hearing the noise of the train.

=== Upper Piper, 1889 ===
On 27 February 1889, a 16-year-old boy employed as a guard on the train from Launceston to the entrance of the tunnel was killed on the Scottsdale railway line when he fell off a truck load of gravel from the moving train in the yard of the Upper Piper station. The trucks of the train had passed over his leg and he was severely injured. He was transported to the Launceston terminus by train and then by stretcher to the hospital where he died from his injuries. It was supposed that the boy had fallen between the trucks while attempting to lift the brakes.

=== Formby, 1889 ===
On 13 April 1889, a man was killed when he was knocked down and injured by a railway truck near the Formby railway station.

=== Macquarie Plains, 1889 ===
On 2 November 1889, a railway labourer from Glenora employed on the Derwent Valley line was discovered badly injured after being run over by a light engine and tender travelling from Glenora to Macquarie Plains. The man was walking home along the line in a state of intoxication when one of his boot heels jammed between the main rail and the wooden check rail near the No. 3 Bridge. The man's foot was severed above the ankle. He was conveyed by a trolley to the New Norfolk Cottage Hospital for treatment before dying from his injuries en route to the Hobart Hospital the following morning.

=== South Bridgewater, 1890 ===
On 30 July 1890, the guard on the down midland train was seriously injured in a shunting accident at South Bridgewater. Two trucks were being shunted from the down midland when the guard put his hand on one of the trucks. His foot became caught in the stop and the block turned him around. It was supposed that man was attempting to jump on the moving train at the time. The guard died from his injuries shortly after midnight the following day.

=== Risdon, 1891 ===
On 10 March 1891 at approximately 10:30am, a man aged about 38 years was killed by the ordinary train from Hobart at the Risdon railway station. The man was attempting to board the train from the platform while it was in motion and fell on to the rails between the carriages with the wheels passing over his body.

=== Hobart, 1891 ===
On 27 April 1891 at approximately 3:00pm, a ballast pit employee received internal injuries in a shunting accident at Hobart railway station. The man had positioned himself between two of the trucks to couple them when the engine returned sending the trucks together jamming the man between the buffers. The man died from his injuries in hospital two days later.

=== Strahan, 1891 ===
On 1 June 1891 at 2:00pm, a man from Ross received fatal injuries when an engine travelling to Strahan with three trucks containing passengers ran off the line injuring five men. The accident occurred at the 14 Mile Peg between Strahan and the Henty River. The man died from his injuries three hours later.

=== Evandale, 1892 ===
On 30 March 1892 at approximately 10:00am, a railway porter was killed while shunting a goods train at the Evandale Junction railway station. The man fell over on the rails after linking up a coupling that was hanging down. He tried two or three times to get back up but got caught in the points by his arm and the wheels of the truck passed over his head.

=== Deloraine, 1893 ===
On 29 May 1893, a young man was killed when he was run over by the Mole Creek train while attempting to cross the railway line near the cattle guards at the racecourse crossing in Deloraine. The man's body was located under the tender.

=== York Plains, 1897 ===
On 16 September 1897, the body of an old man aged approximately 80 years old was found by a gang repairing the railway line at the top of the York Plains incline. It was assumed that the man had been killed by the up mail train while sleeping on the rails. The man had been in the habit of trespassing on the railway line and had been frequently turned away by the permanent waymen.

=== Rhyndaston, 1898 ===
On 20 August 1898, a man was run over and killed by the mail train at Rhyndaston while it was being shunted. The man had been lying between the rails at the time and was found to be under the influence of liquor. The man was a competent bushman who had previously been engaged by Tasmanian Government Railways cutting sleepers on the Scottsdale line.

=== Zeehan, 1899 ===
On 16 May 1899 at 7:15am, the North-East Dundas tram engine boiler exploded within 55 m (60 yards) of the Wilson Street waiting room in the Zeehan railway station yard killing engine driver David Biddelph and fireman Thomas Marra. The engine was completely wrecked and the first truck of the train smashed in the front. No passengers were hurt in the incident.

=== Conara, 1899 ===
On 7 July 1899, a 37-year-old man was killed when he exited a railway carriage on the opposite side of the platform at Conara railway station and was run over by the Launceston to Hobart mail train upon which he was travelling. The man was found to be under the influence of liquor at the time.

=== Rosebery, 1899 ===
On 13 July 1899 at approximately 3:00pm, a man aged about 50 years employed by the Emu Bay Railway works was run over by a ballast engine and killed while working in a ballast pit at Brookville between Rosebery and the Pieman. The man had only started to work for the company on the afternoon of the accident.

=== Queenstown, 1900 ===
On 26 November 1900 at approximately 3:00pm, a 19-year-old man was knocked down and killed on the Mount Lyell Railway by the mixed train near Paice's Railway Hotel. The man had come to Queenstown via Strahan that day looking for work and was walking along the railway line in South Queenstown when the train overtook him.

=== Queenstown, 1901 ===
On 5 October 1901, an 18-year-old man from New Norfolk was critically injured on the Mount Lyell Railway in Queenstown. The man was watching the final football match of the season for the junior association's premiership when an engine and several trucks came from the direction of the smelters. He either did not notice its approach or was neglectful of it until it was too late. In endeavouring to escape from the train he tripped and fell. The empty trucks passed over both of his legs before the train was brought to a standstill. The man was conveyed to the hospital where both of his legs were amputated but he died during the second amputation.

=== Queenstown, 1901 ===
On 22 October 1901 at approximately 2:00am, an employee of the Mount Lyell Company aged about 35 years was run over by the flux train on the railway line between the flux quarries and the smelter near Queenstown. The man was on his way home to his residence on the Strahan Road near the smelters at the time of the accident. It was presumed that the man fell across the track.

=== Westbury, 1903 ===
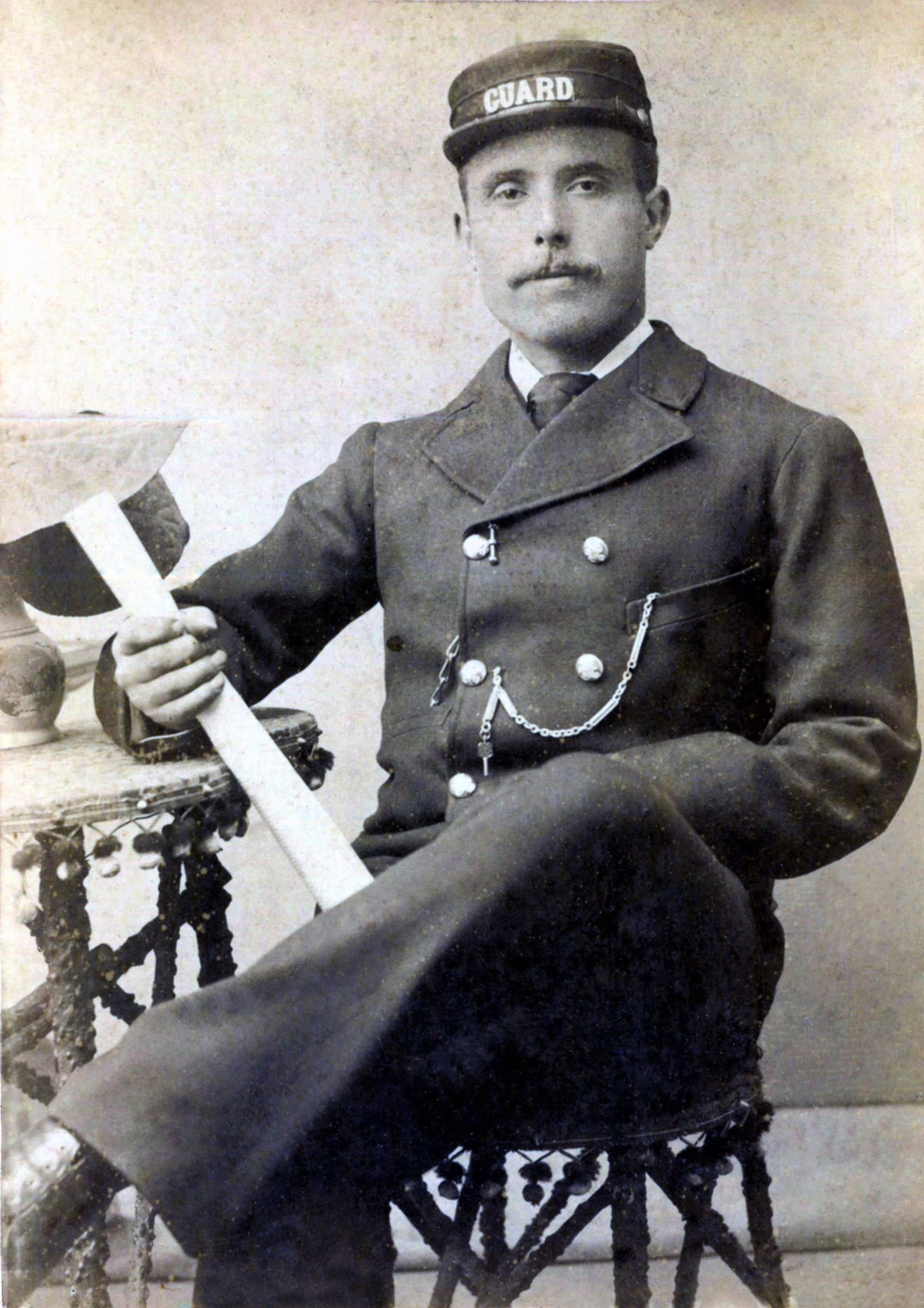
Railway guard Stephen Kitchen Clarke.

On 29 March 1903, 34 year old Stephen Kitchen Clarke, railway guard on the 5pm train from Launceston to Deloraine, died at the Launceston General Hospital after being struck by the gate post at Mantack's Crossing and knocked from the train on the Western Railway between Westbury and Exton the previous evening.

=== Gormanston, 1903 ===
On 6 September 1903, two employees of the Mount Lyell Company aged 28 and 24 years were killed on the haulage line. The men were coming up the line in an empty truck on the mine side of the haulage when a bolster truck loaded with three tons of firewood that was standing on the top of the haulage station got away and travelled down the line dashing into the truck in which the men were riding.

=== New Town, 1904 ===
On 29 February 1904 at approximately 10:10pm, a 75-year-old woman was killed when she was run down walking across the railway bridge over Risdon Road in New Town by the Hobart to Glenorchy train as it pulled out of New Town station. The woman had left her home in Elizabeth Street at about 7:00pm with the intention of paying her fortnightly dues to the friendly society's fund. When she did not return home, her son went to look for her and had only left the police station a few minutes before the police arrived with the news of her death. It was presumed that the woman was suffering from dementia.

=== Karoola, 1904 ===
On 25 May 1904, an 85-year-old man was fatally injured when he was knocked down near Karoola by a train running from Launceston to Scottsdale. The man who was walking along the train line was quite deaf and did not hear the whistle of the approaching train. He was caught by the cow-catcher and thrown off the line. The man died from his injuries while being transferred to Launceston.

=== Gormanston, 1905 ===
On 18 February 1905, an employee of the Mount Lyell Company from Bowral, New South Wales was killed on the haulage line. The man was riding on a loaded truck when a rope broke causing him to fall from the truck onto the tracks where he was struck in the head by a passing truck.

=== Kelly Basin, 1905 ===
On 25 April 1905 at approximately 4:30pm, a ganger aged about 60 years from County Cork employed by the North Mount Lyell Railway was killed 4.0 km (2.5 miles) from Kelly Basin when the trolley he and four other gangers were riding on collided with a special train travelling from Pillinger to Linda.

=== Hobart, 1907 ===
On 1 February 1907 at approximately 11:53pm, a 29 year old bluejacket from the HMS Pioneer was killed by the incoming Glenorchy train near the man-of-war steps at the Domain in Hobart. The man having already crossed the railway tracks to make his way back to his ship via a landing boat unexpectedly returned to the railway line where he was hit by the train. The man was a native of Darlington, England.

=== Zeehan, 1907 ===
On 1 April 1907 at approximately 10:00pm, the body of a man was found deceased on the railway line about 3.2 km (2 miles) from Zeehan in the direction of the racecourse. It was presumed that the man was knocked down and killed by the train from Dundas.

=== Bridgewater, 1908 ===
On 1 June 1908, the body of 32-year-old man was found on the railway line at the Wallace Street crossing at the northern end of the Bridgewater Junction railway station. It was assumed that the man was clipped by the mail train although the driver of the train did not notice anything unusual when travelling through the crossing.

=== Rhyndaston, 1908 ===
On 13 October 1908 at approximately 3:00pm, a woman aged about 50 years on holiday from Tunbridge and an 8-year-old girl were killed in the Rhyndaston Tunnel when they were struck down by the Parliamentary express train. The woman and the girl were walking through the tunnel at the time of the accident and presumably were not aware that the express was due to pass through the tunnel earlier than usual that day.

=== Queenstown, 1910 ===
On 11 July 1910 between 8:00am and 9:00am, a 51 year old miner from Switzerland employed at the North Mount Lyell Mine was run down on the North Mount Lyell Railway by a locomotive returning to the mine with a load of empty trucks. The man had finished night shift at the mine and was making his way home to Queenstown along the train line. Close to where the accident occurred there was a sharp curve on the line and a fierce gale was blowing at the time. It was surmised that the man neither saw nor heard the train coming.

=== Bridgewater, 1914 ===
On 27 March 1914 at approximately 7:40pm, a 30-year-old man from Broadmarsh was killed and his wife seriously injured at a level crossing above the North Bridgewater railway station when his four-wheeled vehicle being driven by two horses collided with the Brighton to Hobart train. The man's wife who sustained broken ribs in the accident was holding their 27 month old daughter at the time. The child was unharmed.

=== Tea Tree, 1914 ===
On 9 December 1914 at 6:40pm, a 25-year-old woman was killed when her horse drawn buggy collided with the Launceston to Hobart express at Russell's level crossing (formerly known as the Willows) on the Main Line 1.21 km (0.75 miles) on the Campania side of the Tea Tree station. The buggy contained three other people, only one of whom was slightly injured. All of the occupants of the buggy were thrown out on impact with the deceased striking a telegraph pole and dying from her injuries on the way to hospital.

=== Lynchford, 1914 ===
On 25 December 1914 at approximately 2:00am, the body of a man aged about 50 years from Ballarat was discovered on the railway line 1.6 km (1 mile) from Lynchford station on the Queenstown side. It was concluded that the man who was under the influence of alcohol at the time had been lying down near the railway line when he was struck by a locomotive on the Mount Lyell Railway the previous evening.

=== Hobart, 1915 ===
On 26 March 1915, a 21 year old railway porter was fatally injured when he slipped from a moving locomotive in an attempt shut the door of a passing carriage at the Hobart railway station. The carriage door struck the man in the head, threw him against the axle-box of the bogey and then back against the carriage. He died later that day in the General Hospital without regaining consciousness. The man had been working on the railway extension to the Ocean Pier and was returning to the station on the footboard of the engine when the accident occurred.

=== St Leonards, 1915 ===
On 13 September 1915 at approximately 5:00pm, the body of an unidentified man aged about 58 years was discovered on the railway line near St Leonards. He was evidently struck by the 5:00pm train from Deloraine. The man had left Launceston on the 2:40pm train and was later seen wandering along the line near St Leonards.

=== Campania, 1916 ===
On 15 February 1916 at approximately 4:00pm, a train driver and six passengers were killed and twenty nine seriously injured when the express from Launceston to Hobart, with 200 passengers on board, was derailed 3.2 km (2 miles) north of Campania. The engine jumped the rails, and dragged after it the three front carriages. The carriage nearest the engine was smashed to pieces.

The train was rounding a curve, but a fairly easy one, as compared to some of the curves higher up the line. According to the statements of passengers, the speed was not very great, and no one seems to have any idea how the accident occurred.

=== Hobart, 1916 ===
On 13 March 1916 at approximately 9:44pm, a 27-year-old man from Hobart was critically injured at the Macquarie Street railway crossing when he crossed the tracks in front of a Hobart bound train running after a woman. The man's leg was caught by the cow-catcher and he was dragged 14 m (15 yards) along the line. The man died from his injuries at the Hobart General Hospital the following evening.

=== Campbell Town, 1916 ===
On 3 June 1916 at approximately 7:39am, a 56 year old railway line repairer was travelling along the train line on a tricycle when he was run down by a conditional night goods train running three hours late from Hobart to Launceston and killed instantly. The accident occurred 1.6 km (1 mile) north of the Campbell Town station. The man's wife witnessed the accident and tried to attract the attention of the engine driver.

=== Rosebery, 1917 ===
On 25 May 1917, a 43 year old railway ganger was killed when the rail motor on which he and five other fettlers were travelling on the Emu Bay Railway line was dashed into the train travelling in the opposite direction from Zeehan to Burnie. The three men on the back seat of the motor were thrown clear of the line and escaped with minor injuries. The three men on the front seat sustained broken bones and internal injuries. The accident occurred about a mile on the Pieman side of the Primrose Siding near the Pieman bridge. The men were returning to their homes at Rosebery from Tullah when the accident occurred.

=== Brighton, 1917 ===
On 1 November 1917, a 24 year old railway porter was killed instantly at Brighton Junction while shunting the trucks of the midland train. The man was in between the buffers of two wagons and gave the signal for the train to proceed but his feet became caught in the check rail. The man was thrown down and the wheel severed his head, leg, and an arm from the body which was mangled.

=== Zeehan, 1917 ===
On 27 December 1917 at approximately 12:00pm, a 26-year-old man employed by the Tasmanian Government Railways was seriously injured in a shunting accident at the Zeehan rail yards. The man miscalculated the distance between the double and single buffers and was severely crushed in the lower portion of his body. The man died from his injuries six days later.

=== Winnaleah, 1918 ===
On 24 May 1918, a German labourer was killed on the railway construction works at Winnaleah. The man was riding on ballast trucks on a train that had stopped to pick up two trucks of timber. The coupling chains parted causing the loaded trucks to heavily strike the stationary vehicles. The man lost his balance and fell under the moving truck, the wheels of which passed over his body killing him instantly.

=== York Plains, 1918 ===
On 9 August 1918 at 8:20am, the body of a 51 year old farmer was discovered on the western side of the railway line near his residence at York Plains about 180 m (200 yards) south of the 62 mile peg. It was assumed that the man slipped on the end of a sleeper and fell in front of a train as it passed during the night. The man was in the habit of walking along the railway line and might have been affected by alcohol at the time.

=== Devonport, 1918 ===
On 14 September 1918, a 38-year-old man was killed instantly while discharging limestone trucks at Devonport. The man was leaning across the railway line to unblock a choked limestone hopper when the guard's van from the train that had arrived from the Melrose quarry ran down the line, striking the trucks and sending the wheels of one of the trucks across the man's body.

=== Hobart, 1918 ===
On 6 October 1918 at approximately 6:50am, a man was killed in the Hobart railway station yard when a carriage and the guard's van of the mail train ran over him during a shunting operation.

=== Smithton, 1918 ===
On 20 December 1918 at approximately 2:30pm, a 27 year old schoolmaster from Marrawah was killed instantly and four others injured, one seriously, when a large tree fell on their tarpaulin covered carriage at 9 Mile. The train was travelling from 17 Mile to Smithton on the Marrawah Tramway. The train was at a standstill taking on water when the accident occurred. A 2-year-old girl died that night from her injuries.

=== Moonah, 1919 ===
On 8 March 1919 at approximately 7:28pm, a 58-year-old man from Deloraine was killed on the level crossing at the Moonah railway station. The man's 59 year old wife and 38-year-old daughter-in-law were critically injured. The party had waited at the crossing for a horse train to pass when they stepped in front of a second train entering the station from the opposite direction. The man fell under the wheels of the engine and was killed instantly. The accident occurred in front of the man's son who was on the other side of the crossing and tried to warn them of the danger.

=== Hobart, 1920 ===
On 25 May 1920 at approximately 3:25pm, an 80-year-old woman from Perth was knocked down and killed while crossing the railway at the Botanical Gardens by a train from Hobart bound for the Risdon Zinc Works. The woman who was in the company of another elderly lady was walking in the direction of the Derwent River from the Botanical Gardens when she stepped in front of the train.

=== Burnie, 1921 ===
On 10 July 1921, a 38-year-old man from South Burnie employed by the Emu Bay Railway as an engine driver and fireman was badly injured while transporting a load of old railway sleepers for firewood on a trolley about 1.6 km (1 mile) from Burnie on the rail line. The trolley lost control and left the rails causing the load of sleepers to be thrown forward on top of the man. Another man on the trolley escaped with minor injuries. The man died from his injuries two days later at the Launceston Hospital.

=== Moonah, 1921 ===
On 2 December 1921 at approximately 11:00am, a 50 year old carpenter from Derwent Park received serious injuries when the motor lorry he was a passenger in collided with the Midland mixed train at the Albert Road level crossing in Moonah. The man was thrown from the motor lorry and dragged for a distance of about 9.1 m (30 feet). The driver of the motor lorry was also injured. The man died from his injuries in the Hobart General Hospital nineteen days later.

=== Gormanston, 1921 ===
On 17 December 1921 at approximately 4:30pm, a worker aged about 45 years employed at the Mount Lyell Company was killed when he was caught by an ore truck on the haulage line and carried along until he collided with the projecting timber of one of the ore bins. The man had finished work for the day and was standing on the line waiting to catch the workers' train back to Queenstown when the accident occurred.

=== Devonport, 1921 ===
On 31 December 1921 at approximately 11:00pm, a fireman from the ship SS Koranui aged about 33 years was killed by a goods train from Launceston near the signal box at the wharf crossing in Devonport. The man who was under the influence of liquor at the time was dragged 9.4 m (31 feet) along the line by the train. Broken pieces of a glass bottle were discovered on the train's cow-catcher.

=== Launceston, 1922 ===
On 28 June 1922 at approximately 2:30pm, a fireman employed by the Tasmanian Government Railways was crushed between moving rail trucks and a sand bin while shunting at the Launceston railway yards. The man died from his injuries in the Launceston Public Hospital five days later.

=== Deloraine, 1922 ===
On 28 November 1922 at approximately 4:15pm, a permanent way employee of Tasmanian Government Railways aged about 63 years was killed when a goods train from Launceston engaged in shunting operations ran over him in the shunting yard at the Deloraine railway station.

=== Smithton, 1923 ===
On 30 October 1923, a 69-year-old man from Shipton Bellinger was knocked down and seriously injured by the Irishtown-Smithton train at Pulbeena Siding near Smithton. The man who was very deaf was proceeding to the siding to collect a parcel. The approaching train sounded its whistle and the man left the line only to suddenly return as he apparently did not hear the whistle.

=== Deloraine, 1924 ===
On 26 February 1924 at approximately 4:50pm, an old man was seriously injured when he was struck by the coast train from Launceston at the level crossing opposite the Deloraine Hotel and was carried 59 m (65 yards) on the cow-catcher before the locomotive could be stopped. The man was conveyed to the Launceston Public Hospital with broken bones and his wooden leg had been smashed. The man was very deaf which may have been the cause of the accident. The man died from his injuries early the following day.

=== Campbell Town, 1924 ===
On 28 February 1924 at 1:00am, a 24 year old train guard was shunting stock trucks on the down mail train near the cattle ramp at the Campbell Town railway station when he became jammed between the ramp and the trucks and was severely crushed. The guard was conveyed to the Campbell Town Hospital in a critical condition. The man died from his injuries sixteen days later.

=== Devonport, 1924 ===
On 4 April 1924 at 10:20am, a 42 year old train guard was killed while shunting trucks at the Devonport railway yards. The man went between trucks for coupling purposes while train was in motion. He slipped and fell while attempting to vault over the buffers and was struck by a truck that rolled over him several times.

=== Bridgewater, 1924 ===
On 14 April 1924 at approximately 5:00pm, a 40-year-old man from Tunnack was fatally injured on the Main Line between Brighton Junction and Bridgewater Junction when he rode his motorcycle with a sidecar into the R class locomotive hauling the express from Launceston. The man died from his injuries early the next day at the Hobart Public Hospital.

=== Burnie, 1924 ===
On 2 October 1924 at approximately 12:00am, a 49 year old waterside worker from Deloraine was killed on the Ocean wharf at Burnie when he was crushed between the buffers of two railway trucks. The man was working unsupervised on the wharf assisting with the discharging of coal from the steamship Kamo when the accident occurred.

=== Launceston, 1924 ===
On 25 October 1924 at approximately 2:20pm, a man riding a two stroke motorcycle was struck by the boat express train on the Charles Street railway bridge crossing in Launceston. The man was crossing the bridge from the city in the direction of Invermay and was not looking in the direction of the approaching train when he crossed in front of it. The train was travelling from the Launceston railway station to King's Wharf at the time of the incident. The man died from his injuries in the Launceston Public Hospital early the following morning.

=== Glenorchy, 1925 ===
On 22 January 1925 at approximately 12:00pm, a 39 year old labourer from Moonah was seriously injured when he was overtaken and knocked down by the 12:10pm train from Hobart. The man was walking along the railway line between Moonah and Derwent Park with another man when a train from the Zinc Works came into view. The whistle from the Zinc Works train drowned out the sounds of the approaching Hobart train on the other line which quickly overtook them. The other man jumped to safety down an embankment. The man died from his injuries in the Public Hospital the following morning.

=== Moonah, 1925 ===
On 15 June 1925, a man aged about 55 years from Lutana was killed when he was struck by the 6:30am train from Hobart at the abattoir level crossing in Moonah. The man died from his injuries at the Public Hospital two hours later.

=== Cornwall, 1925 ===
On 27 November 1925, a man was fatally crushed between two rail trucks near the screens at the Cornwall coal mine. The accident was caused by a defective truck brake. The man had emigrated from England with his wife and three children and had only been in Tasmania for about a fortnight prior to the accident.

=== Hobart, 1926 ===
On 17 March 1926, a 37 year old shunter from West Hobart was killed when he was crushed between the buffers of two heavy trucks in the Hobart goods yard. The man was adjusting a stop block, a piece of wood fixed across one rail of the truck to prevent traffic over that section of rail, when he was caught between the buffers of the two trucks that arrived unexpectedly. The man was taken to the Public Hospital but died within an hour and a half of his admission.

=== Berriedale, 1927 ===
On 17 December 1927 at approximately 10:00am, a 45 year old milk vendor was driving his lorry over a private rail crossing north of Berriedale when he was struck by the rail motor travelling from Oatlands to Hobart. The man was thrown to the ground and died later the same day at the public hospital. The man was accompanied by his young son who was uninjured.

=== Hobart, 1928 ===
On 13 August 1928 at approximately 4:30pm, a 63 year old acting locomotive foreman was knocked down by a locomotive at the Hobart railway yards by an engine that was being transferred from the incoming to the outgoing line. The engine was in the process of moving onto the turntable and jammed the man between the trailing brake-rod and the wheel. The man died from his injuries on the way to hospital.

=== Ulverstone, 1928 ===
On 7 September 1928, the rail motor travelling to Burnie collided with a service car at the Reibey Street level crossing. The service car was en route to Launceston with five passengers who were all severely bruised and shaken. The force of the impact caused the vehicle to be thrown clear of the line and driven against a picket fence. One of the passengers, a 59-year-old woman, died from her injuries four days later.

=== Tea Tree, 1929 ===
On 23 January 1929, a 24-year-old man from Bagdad was killed and his father rendered unconscious when their motor-caravan collided with the Launceston evening service train at the Tea Tree railway station.

=== Queenstown, 1929 ===
On 2 November 1929, a 29 year old worker from the Comstock mines was seriously injured when a bolster returning to Queenstown overturned on the Comstock rail line. About 25 men were travelling on the bolster on the down grade when the truck overturned while rounding a curve. A number of men were pinned beneath the truck and had to be extricated by those who were only slightly hurt. Thirteen other men were injured in the accident. The man died from his injuries in the Queenstown Hospital five days later.

=== Burnie, 1930 ===
On 1 January 1930 at 12:30pm, a 33-year-old man, his 23 year old wife, and their four month old son were killed with four other people injured when the vehicle of a travelling pantomime company collided with a Launceston bound train at the Wivenhoe railway station level crossing. A fourth passenger died twenty days later from his injuries.

=== Spreyton, 1930 ===
On 15 March 1930, a 19-year-old man and his 8-year-old sister were killed when the Launceston to Wynyard passenger train collided with their single-seater Essex car at a Spreyton level crossing as they were returning from a trip to Latrobe.

=== Rosetta, 1930 ===
On 25 June 1930, the body of a 64-year-old man was discovered at the bottom of a culvert over which the rails travel 27 m (30 yards) on the Hobart side of the Rosetta station. The body was discovered by the crew of a train returning to Hobart from the Cadbury factory at Claremont. The man had embarked on the 5:25pm train from Hobart the previous day with the intention of returning to his cottage in Berriedale but had failed to arrive. It was surmised that the man mistook the Rosetta station for the Berriedale station and fell from the carriage after existing from the side where there was not a railway platform. The man had come into violent contact with the concrete superstructure of the culvert before falling into it.

=== Hobart, 1930 ===
On 31 July 1930 at approximately 6:20pm, a 62-year-old man from Triabunna was killed when he was struck by a train passing through the cutting opposite Government House, Hobart. The man was walking on the lines at the time of the accident.

=== Launceston, 1930 ===
On 7 October 1930 at approximately 8:45am, a 37 year old shunter employed at the Launceston railway station was killed while shunting a truck onto the Shell's private siding near the evaporating works. The man apparently fell from a buffer on which he was riding and the rear wheels of a 30-ton oil truck passed over his body.

=== Western Junction, 1931 ===
On 28 July 1931, a 45-year-old man from Launceston fell out from a carriage on the evening train from Hobart to Launceston at Western Junction. He was returning to Launceston after visiting friends at Evandale. He died from his injuries at the Launceston Public Hospital the following day.

=== Leith, 1931 ===
On 5 October 1931, a Launceston man of approximately 40 years of age collided with the evening passenger train from Launceston on his motorcycle at the Leith crossing near the bridge over the Forth River. He died from his injuries two days later.

=== Tyenna, 1932 ===
On 9 February 1932 at approximately 7:15pm, an 8-year-old boy was killed when he was crushed beneath the wheels of a railway truck in the railway siding yard at Tyenna. The boy was playing with two other boys and riding on the buffer when he slipped off into the middle of the railway track. He attempted to get out of the way but was only half way over one of the rails when the front wheel of the truck caught him and ran him over.

=== Rocherlea, 1932 ===
On 28 March 1932 at 9:30am, a 67-year-old man was killed when he was struck by a train travelling from Scottsdale to Launceston 1.21 km (0.75 miles) on the Scottsdale side of Rocherlea. The man who was deaf was a wood cutter out gathering mushrooms and was walking along the sleepers between the railway line when the cow-catcher of the engine caught his foot. Evidently the man did not hear the whistle of the approaching train.

=== Moonah, 1932 ===
On 26 April 1932 at approximately 5:11pm, a 64-year-old woman was killed when she was run down by a Sentinel-Cammell steam wagon travelling from Hobart to Launceston on the railway crossing on the northern side of the Moonah railway station. The woman had disembarked from the train at the station and is believed to have mistaken the front of the wagon for the rear of a train travelling in the opposite direction when crossing the tracks.

=== Bridgewater, 1933 ===
On 14 February 1933 at approximately 3:30pm, a 10-year-old girl was fatally injured when she rode her bicycle into the path of the express train from Launceston at the crossing near the cattle yards in Dromedary Road, Bridgewater. The girl was returning home from attending school in Bridgewater when the accident occurred. Evidently the girl did not hear the train whistle on account of the wind that was blowing at the time. The girl was dragged along by the train over the cattle guards and thrown clear on the other side. She died from her injuries later that afternoon at the Hobart Public Hospital.

=== Bridgewater, 1933 ===
On 11 August 1933 at 7:00pm, a 61 year old business man from Ouse was killed when his tourer car was struck by a train travelling from Brighton to Hobart at the first level crossing to the north of Bridgewater.

=== Strahan, 1934 ===
On 9 June 1934, a 23 year old teacher from the Strahan State School fell from a train about 1.6 km (1 mile) from the Regatta Point station on the Mount Lyell Company's railway line and was killed. The woman was last seen alive in the vicinity of Lowana standing on the platform of a passenger coach at the back of the train when she apparently over-balanced over the rail. The accident occurred between Lowana Flat and Regatta Point.

=== Hobart, 1934 ===
On 15 November 1934 at approximately 12:00pm, a 36 year old Assistant Stationmaster sustained serious injuries when he slipped between a moving suburban train and the Macquarie Street platform at the Hobart railway station. The man was on duty on one of the platforms where a train was leaving for Granton. It was the man's intention to reach the Macquarie Street platform to supervise the race traffic. The man stepped onto the Granton train with the intention of alighting at the platform further down the line. His foot slipped and he fell between the moving train and the platform. He died from his injuries that night at the Hobart General Hospital. The man had been transferred from Launceston to Hobart only a few months prior to his death.

=== Doctors Rocks, 1934 ===
On 28 December 1934, a 12-year-old girl was killed and nine others injured when a passenger train bound from Burnie to Wynyard crossed a culvert at Doctors Rocks that had been undermined by flood waters and collapsed under the weight of the tender.

=== Powranna, 1935 ===
On 7 August 1935 at approximately 8:30pm, a woman received fatal injuries at a level crossing near Powranna railway station when the vehicle being driven by her husband struck a stationary truck on which was mounted a 5,000 gallon petrol tank. The truck was part of the No. 3 goods train from Launceston to Hobart on the Main Line. Her husband was not seriously injured. The woman died en route to Campbell Town Hospital.

=== Lemana Junction, 1936 ===
On 12 January 1936, a man and a woman were killed when their motorcycle collided with a steam Cammell car on its way from Burnie to Launceston at the Lemana Junction crossing. The couple were travelling towards Red Hills from Deloraine.

=== New Town, 1936 ===
On 19 May 1936, a 50 year old New Town man was seriously injured when his single-seater sedan car collided with the 9:00am passenger train to Launceston at the Cornelian Bay level crossing. A gale prevented the sound of the approaching train's whistle from reaching the driver who had his head down at the time of the collision. The man died from his injuries five days later.

=== Hobart, 1936 ===
On 2 July 1936 at approximately 10:30am, a 50 year old temporary employee of the Tasmanian Government Railways from Montrose was killed instantly when he was struck by a train pulling into Hobart railway station. The man was employed on a repair gang working on the railway line approximately 140 m (150 yards) out of the Hobart station.

=== Devonport, 1936 ===
On 1 September 1936 at approximately 1:00pm, a 65-year-old man was killed when the steam railway car from Launceston to Burnie ran into him at the level crossing near Rooke Street in Victoria Parade, Devonport while he was cycling to work. The incident was attributed to the man's deafness and inability to hear the approaching train.

=== Launceston, 1937 ===
On 8 June 1937 at approximately 6:00pm, a 25 year old railway worker sustained injuries to his right foot and knee when he was struck by a moving truck at the Launceston railway station while shunting. The man's foot became trapped at the junction of two sets of rails and a heavy truck travelled slowly onto it. The man was admitted to the General Hospital but died from his injuries thirteen days later.

=== Conara, 1937 ===
On 31 October 1937 at approximately 12:35am, a brother and sister aged 25 and 19 years respectively received fatal injuries when their sedan car crashed into a stationary goods train from Devonport on the northern Conara level crossing after attending a social at Epping. The train trucks were blocking the road at the time of the collision. The train engine driver and porter were found to be negligent in their duties resulting in the deaths and were committed to stand trial on a charge of manslaughter. The Solicitor-General later decided not to file an indictment against them.

=== Launceston, 1937 ===
On 10 November 1937 at approximately 12:00pm, a 62 year old yard foreman from Launceston was fatally injured while directing shunting operations in the Launceston railway yards. The man was standing between one set of rails directing the movements of a shunting engine on another line but was distracted studying some papers when he was struck by the tender and dragged about 7.6 m (25 feet). The man who was due to retire in a few months died in the ambulance on his way to hospital.

=== Devonport, 1938 ===
On 12 January 1938, a 9-year-old girl was fatally injured when she was crushed between two cement trucks at the Devonport wharf. The girl's mother sustained minor injuries. The mother and daughter were endeavouring to pass between two stationary trucks that were being unloaded to the steamer Nairana. The trucks were hauled along the wharf with the aid of a bull-rope attached to the ship's winch when the girl was caught between the buffers. She was rushed to the Devon Hospital but died from her injuries three hours after admission.

=== Don, 1938 ===
On 22 February 1938 at 3:30pm, a 9½ year old boy was fatally injured as the result of a collision between a motor truck and the afternoon mixed train from Burnie at Tyler's Crossing at Don. The train struck the truck behind the cabin and carried it over 91 m (100 yards) along the line. The boy died from his injuries at 7:30pm in the Devon Hospital at Latrobe.

=== Burnie, 1938 ===
On 11 March 1938 at approximately 7:20am, a 28-year-old man received fatal injuries when his face was crushed between the top of the cab of a Garrett engine and a beam running across the inside of the roof of the Emu Bay Railway's engine sheds at Burnie. The man had been engaged in firing the Garrett engines in readiness for its trip to Rosebery. He was running the engine out of the shed when he put his head through a ventilator hole in the roof of the cab to see how much coal was in the bunker. The man died from his injuries an hour and a half after admission to the Darwin Hospital in Burnie.

=== Burnie, 1938 ===
On 26 April 1938 at approximately 5:15am, a 27 year old porter from South Burnie employed by the Emu Bay Railway was killed instantly in a shunting accident when his foot became caught between the joints of two rails and he was run over by a string of trucks loaded with calcines. The man had completed coupling two trucks and was about to jump clear when his right foot became caught in the joints of the rails and he was knocked to the line. The trucks passed over his body dragging it 17 m (56 feet).

=== Ulverstone, 1938 ===
On 1 September 1938 at 11:30am, a 66 year old milk vendor was killed when his horse-drawn milk cart was struck by a train at McMahon's level crossing in Ulverstone.

=== Smithton, 1938 ===
On 6 September 1938 at 7:00am, a 60 year old train driver was killed on the Marrawah Tramway 21.7 km (13.5 miles) from Smithton when the engine he was driving named Big Ben jumped the line. The engine was hauling eleven timber trucks, one of which swung around and pinned the man against the engine. The man died from his injuries that afternoon at the Spencer Hospital in Wynyard.

=== Spreyton, 1938 ===
On 7 November 1938 at approximately 12:00pm, a 46 year old linesman employed by the Tasmanian Government Railways was killed when he was struck by a buffet train north of the Spreyton Racecourse Siding. The man was most likely killed trying to remove a wooden cross-arm from the railway line that had been used to roll a new telegraph pole across the tracks.

=== West Ulverstone, 1938 ===
On 10 December 1938, a 23-year-old man was killed and two others injured when his truck was struck by a Q class locomotive at the Helen Street level crossing in West Ulverstone. One of the injured had been a passenger on the train just a few minutes earlier and was being collected by her brother, the driver of the truck.

=== Woodbury, 1939 ===
On 7 April 1939 at 11:30am, a 62-year-old man accompanied by a 32-year-old man and his 23 year old wife were killed when their Chevrolet sedan car bound for Launceston collided violently with the southward-bound express at a level crossing at Woodbury. A 29-year-old female passenger escaped with minor injuries.

=== Launceston, 1939 ===
On 19 September 1939 at approximately 12:00am, the body of a 77-year-old man was discovered deceased on a shunting track at the Launceston railway yards. The body was found lying between the rails on the line known as the Wash Road and had been run over by a railway truck.

=== West Ulverstone, 1939 ===
On 16 October 1939 at approximately 5:40am, a 24-year-old man was killed at the West Ulverstone level crossing when his car collided with a steam rail car travelling from Burnie to Railton.

=== Newstead, 1939 ===
On 20 October 1939 at 5:30am, The body of a 79-year-old man from St Leonards was found on the railway line at Newstead. The man had been dead for several hours. It was surmised that he was run over by a train late the previous night.

=== Lemana Junction, 1939 ===
On 8 December 1939, a 28 year old Mole Creek man was killed when his motorcycle he was riding from Deloraine to Mole Creek crashed into a goods train at the Lemana Junction station crossing. He died from his injuries the following day.

=== Deloraine, 1940 ===
On 11 January 1940, a 77-year-old man from Deloraine was severely injured when he was knocked down at the Main Street crossing by a rail motor that was returning from Mole Creek to Deloraine. The man died from his injuries in the Devon Hospital at Latrobe two days later.

=== Newstead, 1940 ===
On 17 January 1940 at approximately 5:00pm, an 18-year-old man from Launceston received fatal injuries when his motorcycle collided with a steam car travelling from Launceston to Burnie at the Newstead railway crossing. It was believed the man who worked at the Waverley Mills was travelling towards the city behind a bus. The bus stopped to allow the steam car to pass but the man continued on and came into collision with the steam car. The man died from his injuries several hours later at the Launceston Public Hospital.

=== Colebrook, 1940 ===
On 7 July 1940, a 45 year old ganger from Colebrook employed by the railway branch of the Transport Commission was killed when his four-wheeled trolley left the railway line between Colebrook and Campania and fell approximately 15 m (50 feet) down an embankment. The man was patrolling a section of the line with his 15-year-old son when the accident occurred. The man's son jumped off the trolley before it left the rails.

=== Derwent Park, 1940 ===
On 16 October 1940, a 16-year-old girl from Moonah was knocked down by a train at the Derwent Park railway station while returning home from the Royal Hobart Show. The girl was crossing the line as a Hobart bound train approached and was thrown against a concrete parapet. She received injuries to her head and legs and died from her injuries at the Royal Hobart Hospital three hours later.

=== Devonport, 1940 ===
On 9 November 1940 at approximately 7:30pm, a 41-year-old man and his 10-year-old son were fatally injured when their car collided with the evening steam car travelling from Burnie to Launceston at the Fenton Street Level crossing in Devonport.

=== Glenorchy, 1941 ===
On 24 April 1941, a 42-year-old man was killed and two women aged 33 and 25 from Macquarie Plains received head injuries when the man's utility truck collided with a Cammell car at the Elwick Road level crossing.

=== Bridgewater, 1941 ===
On 4 August 1941, a 54-year-old man from Pontville was killed when his utility truck collided with an express engine at the saleyards level crossing in Bridgewater. The truck appeared to stall as it reached the train line.

=== Latrobe, 1942 ===
On 8 March 1942, the body of a man aged about 23 years from Railton was found beside the railway line about 800 m (0.5 miles) from Latrobe. It was believed he was struck by the night goods train that left Latrobe shortly after 11:00pm. The man was walking along the train line from Latrobe to Railton when the accident occurred.

=== Austins Ferry, 1943 ===
On 11 March 1943, the body of a 30-year-old man from Old Beach was found on the railway line near Austins Ferry station. It is believed that he was struck by a train which left Hobart at 10:20pm the previous evening. Police reported that it had been definitely established that the man alighted from a train which left Hobart at 10:10pm, and was seen walking along the platform at Austins Ferry after that train had left.

=== Queenstown, 1943 ===
On 16 March 1943 at approximately 1:00pm, a 17 month old girl was killed instantly when she was run over by a rail motor belonging to the Mount Lyell Company. The child was playing with her sister in front of a residence in Whitelaw Street, Queenstown. The sister ran clear in time, but the girl who was attempting to crawl over the rails was struck.

=== Hobart, 1943 ===
On 19 May 1943, a 44-year-old man from Hobart was seriously injured when he was struck by a rail motor while walking on the railway line near the slipyards by the Queens Domain. The man died at the Royal Hobart Hospital the following evening from serious back injuries.

=== Claremont, 1943 ===
On 1 September 1943 at approximately 7:40pm, a 53-year-old man and a 50-year-old woman were seriously injured in a level crossing collision near the Claremont railway station. The collision occurred at the point where the road to the Cadbury Chocolate Factory crosses the railway spur line to the factory. The car was travelling from the factory towards the Main Road and the engine was about 73 m (80 yards) off the main line travelling in the direction of the factory when the engine caught the front of the car. The woman died from her injuries in the Royal Hobart Hospital about 10pm the following evening and the man from his injuries four days later.

=== Woodbury, 1943 ===
On 4 October 1943 at 1:45pm, the 66 year old driver of a grocer's van was killed instantly when his van was struck by a goods train travelling north to Tunbridge at a Woodbury crossing.

=== Glenorchy, 1944 ===
On 3 February 1944 at approximately 5:20pm, a 27-year-old man from New Norfolk was killed instantly at the Elwick Road railway crossing when his motorcycle was struck by a Sentinel Cammel car travelling from Glenorchy towards Hobart. The locomotive struck the rear wheel of the man's motorcycle that he was riding from the direction of the Elwick Racecourse towards the Main Road. The motorcycle was thrown onto the down line.

=== Pontville, 1944 ===
On 10 February 1944 at approximately 4:15pm, a soldier was killed and two others of a party of eight were seriously injured on a level crossing at Pontville when a military motor lorry was struck by a goods train on its way from Apsley to Hobart.

=== Railton, 1944 ===
On 19 February 1944 at approximately 6:30pm, a 7-year-old boy was fatally injured when his body was crushed between the buffers of two railway trucks at Railton. The boy was playing near the railway trucks with his brother, sister, and a school mate when one of the trucks was set in motion colliding with the other one. The boy was taken to the Devon Hospital soon after the accident but died from his injuries early the following morning.

=== Zeehan, 1944 ===
On 24 November 1944 at 8:45am, a 33 year old Tasmanian Government Railways employee was killed instantly when he fell from a truck while engaged in shunting operations at the Zeehan railway yards. The man apparently fell on his head and broke his neck with his body landing clear of the railway line.

=== Macquarie Plains, 1944 ===
On 9 December 1944 at approximately 11:30am, a 37 year old police trooper was critically injured and his 9-year-old daughter killed at the station crossing on the Fenton Highway at Macquarie Plains when his motorcycle and sidecar collided with a diesel rail car travelling from New Norfolk. Another girl, a friend of the man's daughter aged 8, was seriously injured in the crash. Both girls were riding in the sidecar. The man was riding his motorcycle from his home at Macquarie Plains in the direction of National Park at the time of the accident. The man later died at the Royal Hobart Hospital as a result of his injuries. The man was survived by a son, daughter and wife who was approximately 8 months pregnant at the time of the accident.

=== Seabrook, 1944 ===
On 25 December 1944 at approximately 12:30pm, a 22 month old girl was killed instantly when she was struck by a train travelling towards Burnie at Seabrook near Wynyard. The girl was sitting on the line near the Seabrook Siding. The driver of the train did not have sufficient time to avoid the tragedy.

=== Latrobe, 1945 ===
On 20 July 1945 at 9:50am, a 38-year-old man died from injuries received when his single-seater car collided with a Launceston-bound goods train at the Gilbert Street level crossing in Latrobe.

=== Tarleton, 1945 ===
On 26 December 1945, a 20-year-old man from Western Creek was killed when his motorcycle collided with a train at the level crossing near Ballahoo.

=== Ulverstone, 1946 ===
On 5 February 1946 at approximately 8:15pm, a 70-year-old man from West Ulverstone was walking along a railway bridge spanning the Leven River at Ulverstone when he was struck by the Launceston to Wynyard goods train and thrown into the river. The man's body was located six days later 6.4 km (4 miles) upstream at Lobster Creek.

=== Avoca, 1946 ===
On 16 March 1946 at 9:15am, a goods train hauling twenty trucks of coal and timber crashed through an embankment weakened by flooding 16 km (10 miles) east of Avoca killing the 41 year old driver from Conara. The engine toppled on its right side pinning the driver down by the reversing lever. The fireman and three passengers escaped without injury. Fifteen trucks came to rest telescoped together in the culvert.

=== Glenorchy, 1946 ===
On 27 May 1946 at approximately 6:50am, a 16-year-old girl was killed when she was run over by a train bound for Montrose at the Glenorchy railway station. The girl was crossing the railway line at a foot crossing at the end of the platform to catch a train to her work in Hobart. Her body was carried about 46 m (50 yards) by the train before it stopped.

=== Wynyard, 1946 ===
On 17 October 1946 at 12:30pm, a 66-year-old man from Wynyard was killed when his horse-drawn sledge was struck at the Frederick Street crossing in Wynyard by a train travelling in reverse from Wynyard to the ballast pit at Flowerdale.

=== Austins Ferry, 1947 ===
On 13 January 1947, an 18 month old girl was seriously injured when she was struck by the 7:58am train from Boyer to Hobart at Austins Ferry. The train rounded a turn 180 m (200 yards) from Austins Ferry when the driver saw the child in the middle of the track about 18 m (20 yards) away. He immediately applied the brakes but could not stop the train before it had passed over her. The child died from her injuries in the Royal Hobart Hospital the following morning.

=== Devonport, 1947 ===
On 17 March 1947, a 61-year-old man was killed on the railway line near the roundhouse in Devonport. It was presumed that the man was walking along the line and was struck by an incoming goods train that arrived after 10:00pm. The man's body was found by two railway employees at 1:00am the following morning when they were coupling trucks for shunting.

=== Glenorchy, 1947 ===
On 18 July 1947, a 24-year-old man from Glenorchy was fatally injured when he was struck by a train near the Elwick Road crossing at Glenorchy. It was believed that the man was walking along the railway track south of the crossing and after jumping from one line to the other to avoid an oncoming train when he was struck by a train coming from Derwent Park. He died shortly after admission to the Royal Hobart Hospital.

=== Stanley, 1947 ===
On 6 September 1947 at approximately 8:30am, a 21 year old railway porter from Rocky Cape was killed almost instantly during the process of shunting at Stanley. The man was walking backwards coupling one group of trucks to another when the heel of his boot got caught in the points and he was run over by the wheels of the truck.

=== Lalla, 1947 ===
On 6 December 1947 at approximately 5:45pm, a 26-year-old man was riding a motorcycle from Lilydale towards Karoola when he collided with a rail motor at the Lalla level crossing. The man died from his injuries at the Launceston General Hospital.

=== Devonport, 1948 ===
On 19 January 1948 at 6:35pm, a 68-year-old man was killed instantly when we was struck by the workers' train from Burnie. The train was passing between Fenton Street and the Esplanade in Devonport when the man stepped back from a fence into the path of the train. The man was very deaf which may have been the cause of the accident.

=== West Wynyard, 1948 ===
On 11 February 1948, a man was killed when his car was struck at a West Wynyard crossing by an Australian Standard Garrett engine travelling from Stanley to Wynyard.

=== Hobart, 1948 ===
On 2 March 1948, a 34 year old signalman from West Hobart was killed instantly when he was dragged 41 m (45 yards) after stepping into the path of the 3:40pm train for Risdon in the Hobart railyards. The man who was about to go on duty had stepped down from the signal box onto the line in front of the oncoming train.

=== Burnie, 1948 ===
On 5 June 1948 at 2:27pm, an 87-year-old man from Upper Natone was killed when he was struck by a diesel train from Launceston to Smithton. The man who was hard of hearing, was walking along the stretch of railway line between Mount and Alexander Streets in Burnie when he was overtaken by the train that was in the process of gathering speed after leaving the Burnie station. The man was dragged along the line for 27 m (30 yards).

=== Scottsdale, 1948 ===
On 9 August 1948 at approximately 12:30pm, a 45-year-old man from South Springfield received fatal injuries when he was thrown into a cattle guard after the vehicle he was a passenger in collided with a train travelling from Herrick to Scottsdale. The accident occurred at a level crossing in Ellenor Street, Scottsdale when the train rammed the truck being driven by the man's son against a fence near the cattle guard. The man and his son were both thrown into the guard. The man's son suffered only abrasions and shock but the man died soon after being taken to the Scottsdale Hospital.

=== Newstead, 1948 ===
On 9 August 1948 at approximately 4:00pm, a 53-year-old man was killed when two railway tricycles collided and derailed between the Killafaddy and Newstead railway stations. The tricycles were travelling towards Newstead and crashed while crossing a culvert. One of the wheels of the tricycle struck the man in the head killing him instantly.

=== Hobart, 1948 ===
On 19 August 1948, an 18-year-old man from Brighton was killed when he was struck by the engine of a northbound train about 16 m (18 yards) on the southern side of the Regatta Ground level crossing in the Queens Domain, Hobart. It was not established at what time the accident occurred, or how many trains had passed over his body before it was discovered.

=== Lietinna, 1948 ===
On 16 October 1948, a 19 month old boy was struck by a rail motor proceeding from Scottsdale to Launceston 1.6 km (1 mile) on the Launceston side of Lietinna. The boy died from his injuries later that day at the Memorial Hospital in Scottsdale.

=== Glenorchy, 1949 ===
On 14 May 1949 at 1:00pm, a man in a car was struck by a train at the Elwick Road level crossing by a train travelling to Elwick Racecourse. The car door was opened by the impact of the crash causing the man to be thrown out where he possibly struck a fence post. He died later that afternoon in the Royal Hobart Hospital.

=== Newstead, 1950 ===
On 24 June 1950, a man with an estimated age between 30 and 35 years was killed instantly when he was struck by a train near the Newstead railway crossing. The man's head was severed and his body flung 37 m (40 yards) by the impact.

=== New Norfolk, 1950 ===
On 6 July 1950 at approximately 5:30pm, a 22 year old porter from New Norfolk received critical injuries when a log train ran over him while he was shunting in the yards of Australian Newsprint Mills The man was working at the rear of a log train near the log gantry when the train moved backwards and knocked him down. He was dragged from under the train by the station master. The man died from his injuries in the Royal Hobart Hospital four days later.

=== New Norfolk, 1950 ===
On 24 October 1950 at approximately 12:00am, the body of a 23 year old Czechoslovak migrant was found on the Derwent Valley railway line parallel with the Main Boyer Road about 1.6 km (1 mile) from New Norfolk after the Hobart to New Norfolk rail motor had passed. At approximately 10:45pm the man had taken two fellow migrants on his motorcycle to Boyer where they were working. It was after the man left Boyer that his body was found on the side of the line. It was believed that the man was struck by a diesel rail car after being involved in a motorcycle mishap and began walking along the railway line to New Norfolk.

=== Lemana Junction, 1951 ===
On 7 January 1951 at 10:45am, a 22-year-old man travelling from Lemana to Deloraine in a late model tourer was killed when he collided with a special passenger train at a level crossing approximately 1.6 km (1 mile) from Lemana Junction. The accident occurred during a heavy rainstorm.

=== Parattah, 1951 ===
On 15 January 1951 at approximately 3:00pm, a 22 year old railway employee was killed instantly on the Parattah-Oatlands line about 2.4 km (1.5 miles) from Parattah. The man was riding on one of two flat-topped railway trucks being pushed by a diesel engine when he slipped and fell onto the rails. Both trucks and the engine passed over him.

=== Moonah, 1951 ===
On 15 June 1951 at approximately 5:25pm, a 19-year-old man from Moonah was killed when he was struck by a Risdon Zinc Works train at Moonah railway station as it made its way to Hobart. The man who was slightly deaf had returned to Moonah from his place of work in Hobart on another train and was crossing the tracks when the accident occurred.

=== Quoiba, 1951 ===
On 16 June 1951 at approximately 2:10am, a 38-year-old man from Launceston was killed when he was run over by a train travelling from the direction of Latrobe. The man's body was found near a railway crossing on a road joining the Bass Highway and the Old Coast Road in Quoiba. The man had left the Metropole Guest House in Devonport on his bicycle at 11:45pm to work at a quarry in Spreyton.

=== Ulverstone, 1951 ===
On 26 September 1951, a 78-year-old man from Sulphur Creek and his 26-year-old granddaughter from Latrobe were killed when the car in which they were travelling in the direction of Devonport struck a diesel rail-car at the Reibey Street crossing in Ulverstone.

=== Perth, 1951 ===
On 4 October 1951 at 4:59pm, a 23-year-old man and a 32-year-old woman from Deloraine were killed when their old model touring car collided with a diesel electric special goods train travelling from Railton to Launceston at a level crossing on the Perth-Carrick road near the cemetery.

=== Colebrook, 1951 ===
On 27 October 1951, a train driver and fireman were killed when the leading diesel electric locomotive of a heavily laden freight train travelling from Hobart to Launceston left the track and plunged over an embankment near Colebrook taking the second locomotive and more than twenty trucks with it. Three passengers and the guard escaped from the wreck with only minor injuries.

=== Derwent Park, 1951 ===
On 11 December 1951 at 11:13am, a 58-year-old man from Moonah died soon after being knocked down at a pedestrian crossing by a diesel electric locomotive from Hobart that was pulling into the Derwent Park station.

=== Parattah, 1952 ===
On 29 March 1952 at 11:54am, a boy aged 4 years and 9 months was killed when a Launceston-bound diesel train struck him after he wandered onto the permanent way near Parattah station. The boy was the son of a railway employee.

=== Devonport, 1952 ===
On 3 April 1952 at approximately 12:00pm, a 67-year-old man was killed when he was knocked down by a shunter engine hauling trucks at the crossing on the wharf approach opposite the entrance from the Esplanade in Devonport. It is believed that the man was walking from the wharf in the direction of the Esplanade when the accident occurred with the train as it was proceeding towards the Caltex Siding.

=== Berriedale, 1952 ===
On 7 April 1952, a 79-year-old woman was seriously injured when she was knocked down by a train travelling to Hobart while crossing the railway line at the Berriedale station. The woman died from her injuries in the Royal Hobart Hospital four days later.

=== Campania, 1952 ===
On 22 April 1952 at 3:50am, a goods train was almost completely derailed near Campania after it failed to negotiate a bend at high speed. The guard's van was the only part of the train to remain on the rails. The 44 year old train driver from Parattah was critically injured after being imprisoned in the wrecked cabin of the leading diesel-electric locomotive. Two other members of the crew escaped with cuts. Sheep and cattle being transported to the Derwent Park abattoirs were killed in the crash. The train driver succumbed to his injuries the following day at the Royal Hobart Hospital.

=== Ulverstone, 1952 ===
On 29 May 1952, a 73-year-old man from Ulverstone was killed instantly when he was run over by the 11:30am goods train from Launceston at the Jermyn Street crossing in Ulverstone. The man who was hard of hearing and short sighted was carried by the train for approximately 55 m (60 yards).

=== Launceston, 1952 ===
On 22 August 1952, a 3-year-old boy died on his way to hospital after being crushed between the buffers of two trucks in the Launceston railway coal yards near the North Esk rowing shed. A motor truck was pushing an empty railway truck towards the tar tap when the two trucks came together causing the fatality.

=== Newstead, 1952 ===
On 9 November 1952, a 9-year-old boy was killed while playing on or near a stationary railway truck beside the railway line near Newstead railway station. It was surmised that the boy fell from the truck and struck his head while playing.

=== Scottsdale, 1952 ===
On 15 December 1952, a 20-year-old man from Bridport was killed when his motorcycle collided with a train travelling from Herrick at the King Street level crossing near the Scottsdale station.

=== Ulverstone, 1953 ===
On 11 February 1953 at approximately 1:10pm, a 50-year-old man from Ulverstone was killed when he was hit by an Ulverstone-bound goods train 180 m (200 yards) on the Burnie side of Picnic Point. It is believed that the man was walking along the train line towards Burnie at the time.

=== Cornwall, 1953 ===
On 18 May 1953, a 10-year-old boy on holiday from Launceston was struck and killed by a train near the Cornwall coal mine. The boy was playing when he ran across the track and was struck by a train that was backing down the line to transport coal from the mine.

=== Tarleton, 1953 ===
On 20 December 1953 at 12:30pm, a 23-year-old woman and her 3-year-old son from Cooee were killed when the car in which they were passengers collided with a special Launceston to Wynyard diesel passenger train at the Ballahoo level crossing near Latrobe. The woman's father-in-law, the driver of the car, was admitted to hospital suffering concussion and multiple abrasions.

=== Ulverstone, 1954 ===
On 15 May 1954 at approximately 12:00pm, an 18 year old farmer from Pine Road, Penguin was killed when his motorcycle collided with a goods train at the West Ulverstone level crossing.

=== Campbell Town, 1954 ===
On 10 September 1954, a 39-year-old man from Bicheno and his 13-year-old daughter were killed with three others wounded when their car was struck and dragged by a diesel locomotive at a Campbell Town level crossing.

=== Mowbray, 1956 ===
On 5 October 1956 at approximately 1:00pm, a 9-year-old boy was fatally injured when a guard's van crashed into a small ganger's car that he was travelling in towards Rocherlea. The guard's van rolled unattended for about 4.43 km (2.75 miles) from a siding at Rocherlea and collided with the ganger's car about 270 m (300 yards) north of the Remount Street crossing in Mowbray. The boy's father and uncle were who were also travelling in the ganger's car were thrown clear at the point of impact. The boy died shortly after 5:00pm in the Launceston General Hospital.

=== Burnie, 1958 ===
On 10 May 1958 shortly before 10:30am, a 22 year old part-time taxi driver from Montello was killed as a result of his taxi colliding with a diesel goods train at the Smith Street railway crossing near the south-east corner of the Wivenhoe Showgrounds. The car had turned off the Bass Highway and was being driven up Smith Street at the time of the accident.

=== Tunbridge, 1961 ===
On 27 April 1961 at approximately 1:00pm, a 73-year-old woman from Sandy Bay received fatal injuries when the late model German sedan being driven by her 74 year old husband was struck by a goods train travelling towards Hobart. The car was being driven towards Launceston when it stalled at a level crossing on the Midland Highway at the southern end of Tunbridge. The woman died from her injuries at the Launceston General Hospital later that afternoon.

=== Montrose, 1961 ===
On 24 September 1961 at approximately 3:00pm, a 72-year-old woman from Brighton was struck by a train at the Riverway Road level crossing in Montrose. The woman rushed in front of the Brighton-bound passenger train which had stopped at the Glenorchy station when the side of the engine struck her, carried her across to the other side of the railway track, and pushed her about 7.0 m (23 feet). The woman died from her injuries at the Royal Hobart Hospital later that afternoon.

=== Glenorchy, 1961 ===
On 25 October 1961, a 25-year-old man from Glenorchy was killed instantly when a Hobart bound train crashed into his car at the Wrights Avenue level crossing in Glenorchy. The man was in the process of leaving his workplace at W.A. McKay's timber yard when his car stalled on the level crossing.

=== National Park, 1961 ===
On 12 December 1961 at approximately 4:30pm, an 84-year-old man from National Park was killed instantly at Hollydene Siding near National Park when he was struck from behind by a diesel engine hauling sixteen empty log trucks to Maydena. The man was deaf and most likely did not hear the train's approaching siren as he was walking along the railway track.

=== Strahan, 1962 ===
On 18 April 1962 at approximately 3:20pm, a 42 year old waterside worker was fatally injured when he was crushed between a railway truck and the platform of the Mount Lyell Company's cargo shed at Regatta Point in Strahan. The man was employed in unloading coke from the Union Steamship Company's Kumalla when the accident occurred.

=== Chigwell, 1962 ===
On 31 October 1962, two 14 year old Claremont High School girls were killed instantly and a 13-year-old girl fatally wounded when a heavy diesel electric railway engine bound for Hobart struck them at Chigwell after the passenger train from Claremont had pulled clear of the station on another line. The 13-year-old girl died from her injuries at the Royal Hospital that night.

=== Hagley, 1963 ===
On 16 April 1963 at approximately 12:30pm, a 44-year-old woman from Dynnyrne was killed instantly when the Tasman Limited passenger train travelling from Wynyard to Hobart ploughed into her small panel van at a level crossing on a straight stretch of the Bass Highway between Hagley and Westbury. The car was being driven towards Westbury and was in the middle of the level crossing at the time of impact.

=== Glenorchy, 1963 ===
On 18 June 1963, a 9-year-old girl from Goodwood was killed when she was struck by the third or fourth carriage of the Hobart-Bridgewater suburban passenger train at the Grove Road level crossing in Glenorchy. The girl was walking home down Grove Road at the time of the accident. She was carried 22 m (71 feet) along the line before being thrown clear.

=== Glenorchy, 1965 ===
On 22 March 1965, a 4-year-old boy was killed instantly when he was hit by a northbound diesel-electric train travelling to Cadbury's Chocolate Factory on the Wrights Avenue level crossing in Glenorchy. The boy and a four-year-old girl were playing with an 18 L (4 imperial gallons) jam tin on the crossing by filling it with wet gravel from council road repairs. The boy who was sitting on the jam tin at the time of the collision was dragged 18 m (60 feet) along the track by the train.

=== Derwent Park, 1966 ===
On 23 December 1966 at approximately 10:00am, a 65-year-old man and his 56 year old wife from Melbourne were killed when a train travelling from Parattah to Hobart ploughed into their station wagon at the Lampton Avenue level crossing in Derwent Park. The train carried the station wagon approximately 140 m (150 yards) past the level crossing.

=== Moonah, 1967 ===
On 4 April 1967, a 48-year-old male pedestrian from Moonah was killed when he either stepped or fell in front of a north-bound diesel train at the Sunderland Street railway crossing in Moonah. He was flung 24 m (26 yards) from the point of impact to the side of the tracks.

=== Launceston, 1967 ===
On 18 December 1967 at approximately 4:00pm, a 27-year-old man from Invermay was killed instantly at the Hoblers Bridge Road railway level crossing in Launceston when the vehicle he was travelling in was hit side-on by a single 56 ton diesel locomotive travelling from Deloraine to St Leonards. One of the train's front buffers penetrated the passenger side window of the vehicle, impaling the car, and proceeded to carry the car 0.80 km (0.5 miles) along the line towards Launceston. The train driver was unable to apply the brakes because the impact had severed the locomotive's brake pipe. The other occupant of the car, also a 27-year-old man from Invermay, received head and back injuries.

=== Launceston, 1970 ===
On 26 January 1970, a 26-year-old man was killed and his 24 year old wife seriously injured when his sedan ran into the side of the Launceston to Hobart passenger train at Hobler's Bridge Road railway level crossing. The man's wife died six days later.

=== Austins Ferry, 1970 ===
On 14 May 1970 at 3:55pm, a 14-year-old boy from New Town who was a passenger on a train travelling to Hobart was killed when his head struck the iron frame of an overhead traffic bridge at Austins Ferry. The boy had leaned an arm's length out of the doorway of the train but did not see the bridge. The train was returning from a school holiday excursion trip to National Park when the accident occurred.

=== Highclere, 1970 ===
On 28 May 1970 at 7:30am, a 59 year old railway fettler from Hampshire was critically injured in a head-on collision between a fettler's truck travelling from Highclere towards Burnie and an empty ore train on the Emu Bay Railway line that was proceeding from Burnie to Rosebery to load concentrates. Three other men on the ganger's truck jumped clear just before the collision and were not injured. The fettler died in the Burnie division of the North-Western General Hospital three hours after the accident.

=== Hagley, 1971 ===
On 11 February 1971 at approximately 6:00pm, a 47-year-old woman from Deloraine was killed and her 55 year old husband seriously injured with leg and head injuries when their late model sedan travelling towards Deloraine collided with a Launceston bound goods train. The car was carried 180 m (200 yards) along the track wrapped around the front of the train's leading engine. The vehicle that was being driven by the man came into collision with the train at the Hagley-Westbury railway crossing on the Bass Highway.

=== Glenorchy, 1971 ===
On 25 February 1971 at 7:15pm, a young male cyclist aged about 10 years who was riding his pushbike from Main Road, Glenorchy towards the Brooker Highway died after a level crossing smash in Grove Road. He was hit by the front of a southbound train after passing behind the northbound Cadbury's Chocolate Factory train. The boy was admitted to the Royal Hobart Hospital in a critical condition and died three hours later.

=== Wynyard, 1972 ===
On 25 January 1972 at 5:30am, a 25 year old invalid pensioner from Wynyard was killed when his Valiant station wagon collided with a stationary train at the Goldie Street level crossing in Wynyard. The man was killed 660 metres from where his father was killed in a similar level crossing accident on 17 October 1946.

=== Lilydale, 1972 ===
On 10 May 1972 at approximately 3:00pm, four railway workmen died when a goods train hauling 90 tons of superphosphate from Launceston to Lilydale ploughed into their motorised trolley near Lilydale on the Launceston-Scottsdale line. The workmen were engaged in an operation laying railway sleepers and were in the process of returning to Launceston when the accident occurred. Another two men dived to safety from the trolley seconds before the collision and escaped with only minor injuries.

=== Burnie, 1973 ===
On 16 August 1973 at approximately 7:30pm, a 33-year-old man was killed instantly when his car collided with a Launceston bound goods train at the Corcellis Street level crossing in Wivenhoe. The man's car was travelling south along Corcellis Street and was pushed along the railway track for about 400 m (0.25 miles) before the train stopped. The force of the impact almost ripped the entire roof off the car.

=== Western Junction, 1979 ===
On 9 November 1979 at approximately 1:52am, a 20 year old Australian National employee from Perth was killed instantly when he was crushed between two carriages at Western Junction railway station. The man was coupling the two carriages when a small shunting engine hit the back of one of the carriages trapping him.

=== Burnie, 1983 ===
On 19 July 1983 at 11:25am, a 3-year-old boy from Heybridge was killed and his 5-year-old brother critically injured when an east bound railway engine hit the sedan being driven by their father at a railway level crossing in Wivenhoe. The impact tore off the vehicle's roof and hurled the car onto a gravel bank near the crossing. The parents of the boys escaped with only minor injuries. The 5-year-old boy died from his injuries five days later at the Royal Hobart Hospital.

=== Burnie, 1986 ===
On 16 January 1986 at approximately 12:30pm, a 59 year old truck driver from Devonport was killed when his semi-trailer collided with a goods train just east of the narrow Emu River rail bridge in River Road, Wivenhoe. After slicing through the semi-trailer, two of the three engines pulling the Burnie bound train, four cement wagons and another loaded with fertiliser plunged off the rail bridge into the Emu River. Two pipelines that take fuel across the bridge from the Burnie wharf to storage tanks on the eastern bank of the river were ruptured by falling wagons. The bodies of the train driver, aged 48, and the fireman, aged 36, both from Devonport, were recovered from the submerged cabin of the train by police divers the following day.

=== Calder, 1987 ===
On 29 April 1987 at 5:20pm, a 12-year-old boy from Wynyard was fatally injured when the truck he was a passenger in was struck by a train in Fosters Lane, off Ballast Pit Road, Calder. The boy died on arrival at the Burnie Division of the North-West General Hospital. The boy's 42-year-old father was admitted with broken ribs and concussion.

=== Conara Junction, 1992 ===
On 7 December 1992, a chartered south-bound minibus collided with the front of a north-bound coal train on a level crossing at Conara Junction on the Midland Highway. The bus was transporting six adults and nine teenagers from George Town High School on a four-day excursion to the south of the state. A woman died at the Royal Hobart Hospital from her injuries and fourteen others were injured, two seriously.

=== Granton, 1998 ===
On 22 July 1998 at approximately 6:45pm, a 39-year-old woman from Hobart was killed and her 11-year-old daughter critically injured when their four-wheel drive Toyota LandCruiser was struck by a northbound goods train while turning right into a long driveway in Old Main Road beside the Derwent River at Granton.

=== Launceston, 2006 ===
On 4 September 2006, a 51 year old Pacific National employee was killed when a wagon he was inspecting was shunted from the other end and pinned him. Pacific National admitted that it failed to provide a safe work system when the man died at its East Tamar maintenance depot railyards.

=== Spreyton, 2010 ===
On 26 September 2010, a teenage boy was killed when his all-terrain vehicle collided with a train on a private road. The boy failed to stop at a stop sign on a private driveway and rode into the path of a train carrying cement at Spreyton, just south of Devonport. He was thrown under the train and died instantly.

=== Longford, 2012 ===
On 5 May 2012 at approximately 1:30pm, a 68-year-old man was killed instantly when he drove onto the level crossing over Wilmores Lane near Longford and was hit by a train.

=== Claremont, 2014 ===
On 5 June 2014 at approximately 9:30am, a 62-year-old woman walking her dog was struck by a train at the level crossing on Box Hill Road in Claremont. The woman was struck by the front right corner of the train in the vicinity of its lower head lamp. The TasRail train consisted of a lead engine, locomotive and fifteen loaded wagons. The woman was conveyed to the Royal Hobart Hospital where she died from her injuries that evening.

=== Evandale, 2022 ===
On 20 July 2022, workers were conducting track maintenance on the South Line when a track-mounted excavator toppled onto its side while lifting a rail maintenance trailer on Evandale Road, Evandale. The vehicle's operator was fatally injured, and another worker sustained minor injuries.

=== Burnie, 2023 ===
On 26 June 2023, a 36-year-old man from the west coast of Tasmania was hit and killed by a train on the railway track near Marine Terrace in Burnie. The man was located deceased on a section of the track below the Bass Highway near the port facilities. The man had climbed a fence to reach a restricted part of the railway and suspected he had been hiding near a carriage when he was struck. The train was being unloaded at the time and the driver was unaware of the incident.

== Non-fatal accidents ==
=== Coal Mine Creek, 1877 ===
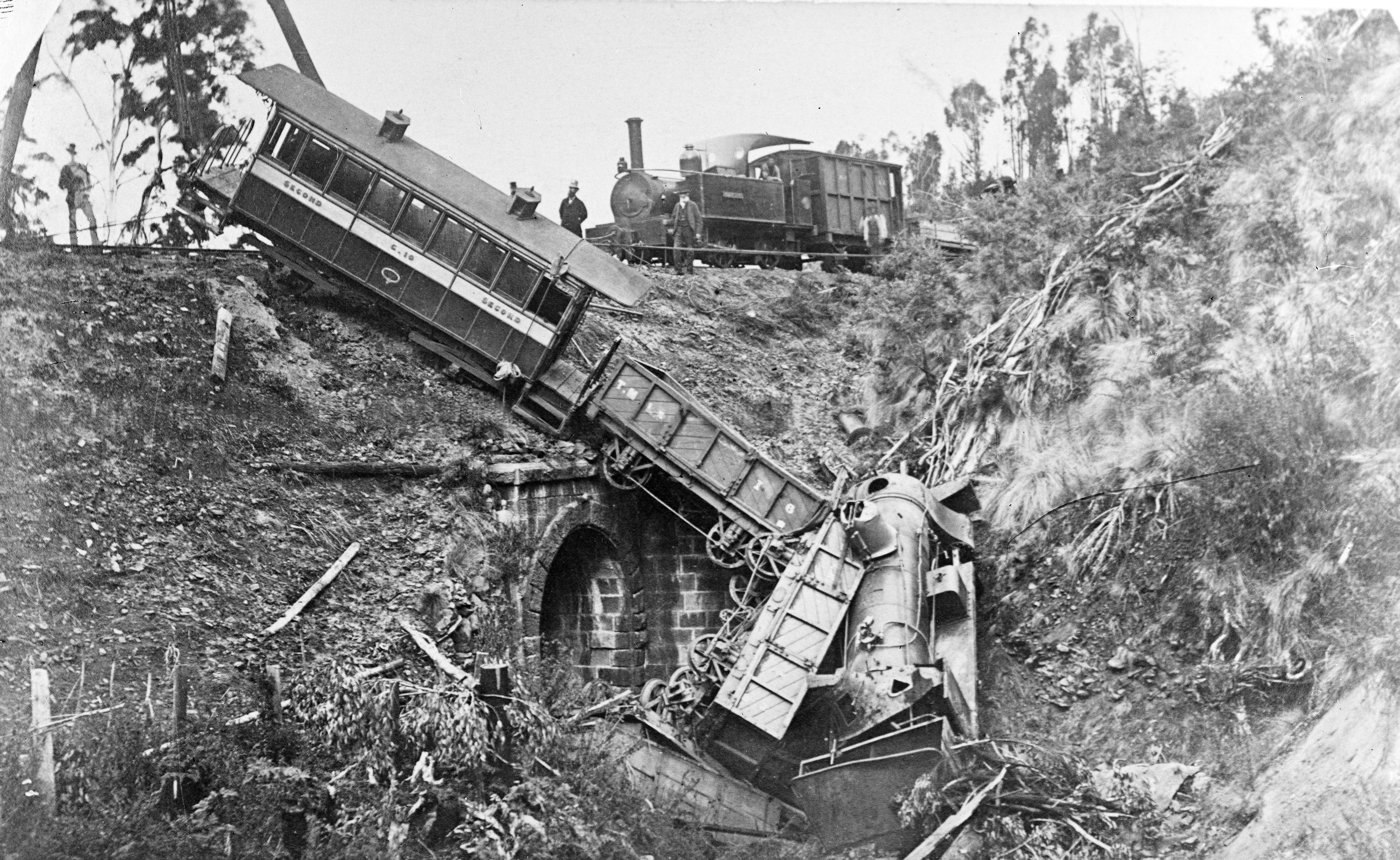
The Coal Mine Creek rail accident, 1877.

On 24 April 1877, the ordinary train was travelling on the Main Line from Launceston to Hobart when a defective rail gave way under the engine while crossing an embankment known as the Coal Mine Creek between Jerusalem and Flat Top Tunnel. The engine fell over the embankment into the gully below dragging several trucks with it. The engine driver and fireman fell under the engine and were seriously injured. There were fifteen passengers on the train at the time with only one of them severely hurt. All of the passenger carriages remained on the rails. This was the worst accident to occur since the line was opened.

=== Horseshoe Bridge, 1893 ===
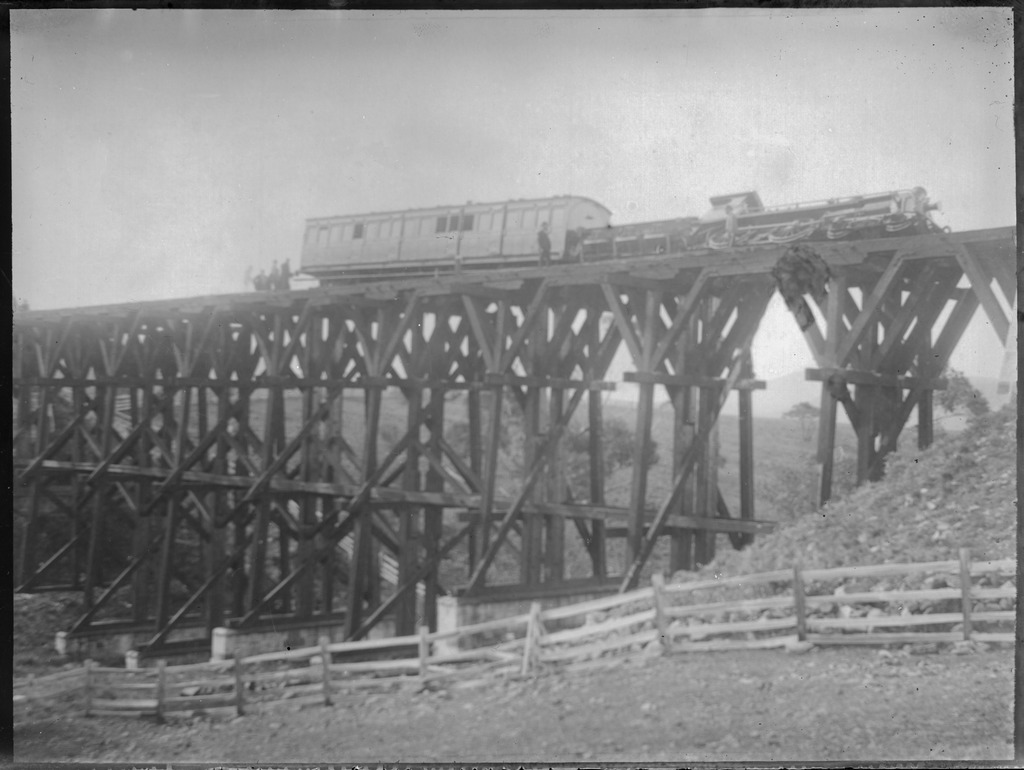
View of the train accident on the Horseshoe Bridge, 1893.

On 20 September 1893 at approximately 8:00pm, the Launceston to Hobart express train on the Main Line derailed due to sabotage on the Horseshoe Bridge that spanned Ironstone Gully, a 20 m (65 feet) chasm, 0.40 km (0.25 miles) south of Brighton Junction station. Bolts had been intentionally removed from the fishplates with sleepers, logs and other obstructions laid across the tracks. The engine rolled over onto its left side and the first carriage was knocked off the rails. There were sixty passengers on board and no reported injuries. Charles Briggs, a labourer residing at Pontville, was charged twice with attempting to wreck the express train. He was eventually released by order of the attorney-general after a majority of jurors found in favour of an acquittal. The saboteur(s) were never identified.

=== Powranna, 1940 ===
On 15 February 1940 at 4:20am, a goods train travelling from Hobart to Launceston derailed after being lifted from the rails by a metal fragment dropped between the main and guard rails on top of a bolt that joined the two. The accident occurred at Walter's Siding, 0.80 km (0.5 miles) on the Hobart side of Powranna station. The engine slewed off the permanent way, plunged across a ditch and came to rest with its cow-catcher buried in an onion bed on the far side not 18 m (20 yards) from a house occupied by three people. Eight wagons were smashed. The three members of the train crew escaped with only minor injuries but some of the livestock being transported were killed.

=== Rekuna, 1946 ===
On 15 October 1946 at approximately 8:00am, the No. 9 goods train was carrying out a shunting operation at Rekuna between Tea Tree and Campania. The front portion of it was detached and steamed to the siding to pick up two railway "camps" and a truck of material for Tea Tree. Returning to the main line it shunted the main section of the train, which commenced to run down the grade before it could be coupled up. A guard attempted to bring it to a stop by applying some of the hand brakes, but the trucks gathered momentum so quickly that he was forced to jump off. The runaway section ran down the grade towards Campania when eight of the trucks, some containing cattle, were derailed and strewn along the line. The rest ran through Campania station at a very fast rate, up an incline then back down the track until they halted in a hollow near the Campania station. Eighteen cattle destined for sale at the Hobart abattoirs were killed or had to be destroyed.

=== Campania, 1947 ===
On 1 November 1947, the engine and tender of the Launceston to Hobart express derailed and turned over approximately 3.2 km (2 miles) on the Hobart side of Campania station. The front coach in which twelve people were travelling was dragged off the line while three carriages and the van remained on the rails. There were about fifty people on the train at the time and no one was injured.

=== Colebrook, 1950 ===
On 11 March 1950 at 9:53pm, a Q class locomotive, three empty petrol wagons and six trucks plunged over a culvert and down an embankment on the approach to Corrigan's Creek, 2.01 km (1.25 miles) north of Colebrook. The guard's van and the last truck stayed on the rails. The driver was trapped in the overturned locomotive and the fireman and his brother who were also on the locomotive were injured. The train guard and a lone passenger were uninjured.

=== Myalla, 1952 ===
On 10 May 1952 at approximately 10:45am, twenty four trucks and the guard's van of a goods train travelling from Stanley to Wynyard were derailed near Myalla. The trucks were not badly damaged and none overturned.

=== Ross, 1957 ===
On 5 December 1957 at approximately 3:30am, twelve trucks of a goods train travelling to Launceston derailed north of the Kermode Siding south of Ross. It is believed recent rain on the clay affected the permanent way and caused the crash. There were no injuries.

=== Burnie, 1970 ===
On 5 December 1970 at approximately 5:45pm, the lead engine of the Tasman Limited travelling from Hobart to Burnie collided with a semi-trailer leaving the North-West Acid Plant at a level crossing on River Road, Wivenhoe. The engine plunged down a steep embankment and into the Emu River where it lay partially submerged for 25 hours. The only casualty was the driver who suffered slight facial lacerations.

=== Quoiba, 1971 ===
On 25 February 1971 at approximately 1:30pm, a 46-year-old man from Burnie driving a semi-trailer hauling several tons of pulp wood logs was struck by a Launceston-bound goods train at the Durkins Road crossing in Quoiba. On impact the train ripped the trailer from the prime mover and carried it about 9.1 m (10 yards) along the railway track.

=== Moonah, 1971 ===
On 25 February 1971 at approximately 5:30pm, a man from Moonah and his two young sons narrowly escaped death when their late model station wagon was struck by a Cadbury's train travelling towards Hobart at the Albert Road level crossing in Moonah. The man did not see the flashing signals as the late evening sun was shining on them. The train clipped the rear of his vehicle.

=== Clarendon, 1977 ===
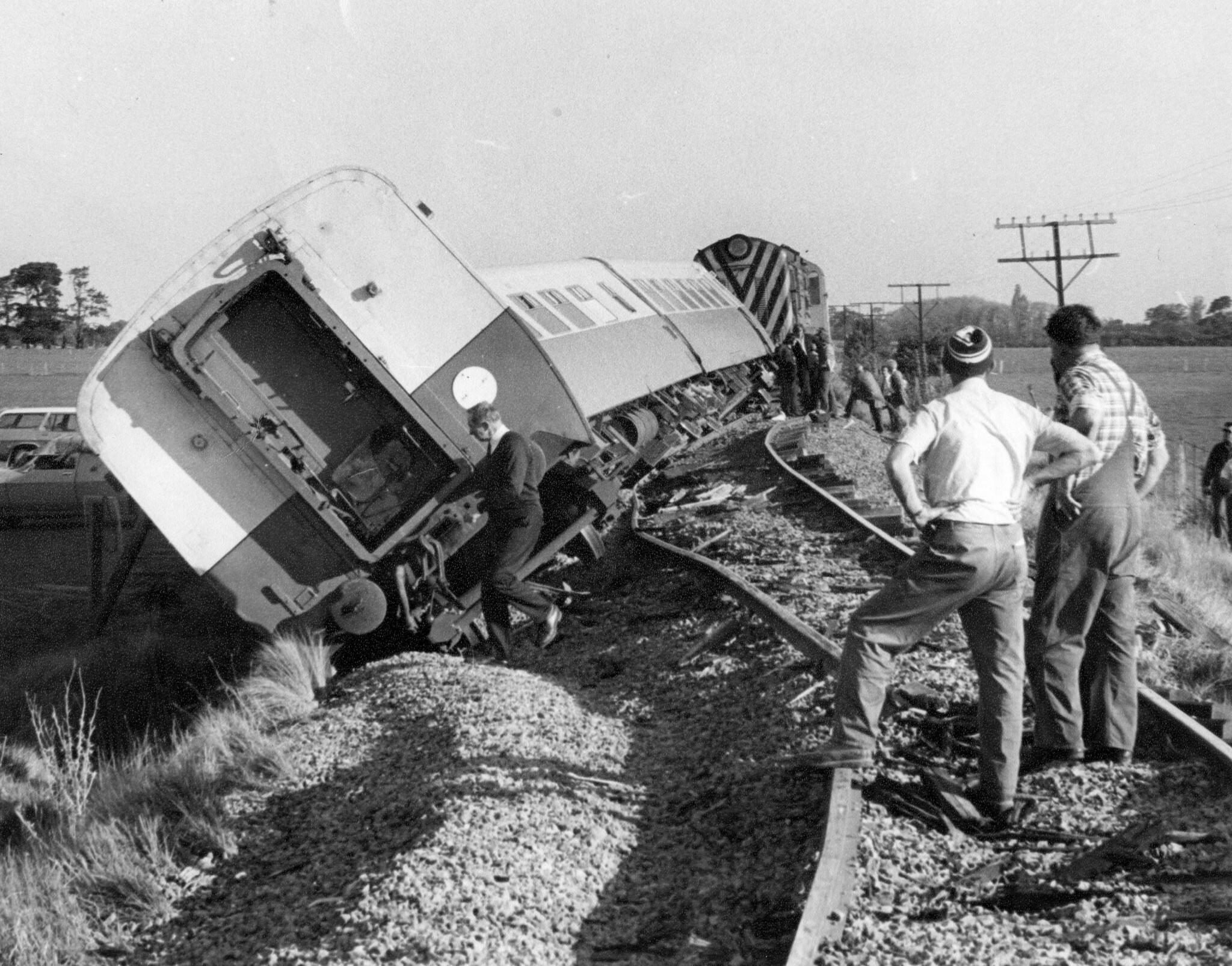
Derailment of south-bound Tasman Limited between Evandale and Clarendon on the Main Line, 24 October 1977

On 24 October 1977 at approximately 2:15pm, the Hobart-bound Tasman Limited passenger train jumped the rails and derailed on the Main Line near Clarendon. There were thirty five passengers on board when two carriages and the guard's van came off the rails and ploughed down an embankment approximately ten minutes after leaving Western Junction. Three passengers were injured.

=== Spreyton, 1987 ===
On 17 July 1987 at approximately 2:30pm, a 19-year-old man from Devonport collided with a train in his early model Land Rover on the Kelcey Tier Road level crossing in Spreyton. The vehicle was being driven towards Devonport and the train was bound for Launceston with a load of empty clay containers.

=== Powranna, 1989 ===
On 28 September 1989 at approximately 6:30am, a truck fully laden with woodchips collided with a coal train travelling from Burnie to Fingal at a level crossing near the Symmons Plains Raceway on the Midland Highway at Powranna. No one was injured in the collision. The accident occurred in heavy fog and due to the flashing lights at the level crossing not operating at the time of the collision.

=== Evandale, 1989 ===
On 6 December 1989 at approximately 8:00am, a woman from Evandale and her daughter had a lucky escape from injury when their car clipped the rear end of a train in Trafalgar Lane near Evandale.

=== Wynyard, 1989 ===
On 20 December 1989 at approximately 1:00pm, a bus driver from Wilmot stalled his bus on a crossing at the entrance to Burnie Airport and was hit by train laden with logs resulting in the front of the bus being sheared off. The driver had just driven a party of twenty Camberwell Grammar schoolboys and their four escorts safely from the Cradle Mountain National Park to catch a plane back to Melbourne from the Burnie Airport. There were no injuries.

=== Colebrook, 1990 ===
On 14 March 1990 at approximately 8:20pm, a young mother, her 6-year-old son, 2-year-old daughter, and a grandmother escaped with only minor injuries when their car crashed into a goods train at a level crossing near Colebrook.

=== Western Junction, 1999 ===
On 1 November 1999 at 12:15pm, a southbound train carrying paper to Boyer collided head-on with a northbound train carrying coal to Railton west of Western Junction about 500 metres from the road crossing near Launceston Airport. It is believed that both train drivers jumped clear of their cabins just prior to the collision. There were no injuries.

=== Devonport, 2018 ===
On 21 September 2018, a train driver was using remote control equipment (RCE) to control and position a TasRail train so that it could be loaded with cement powder at a siding in Railton when the train did not respond to the commands and started to move. The runaway train, which was on a downhill grade, continued to roll away, leaving the siding and entering the main line towards Devonport.

The train travelled through ten active and three passive public level crossings, beneath a highway overpass, and through five sets of points, mostly at speeds greater than the maximum track speed. It reached a maximum recorded speed of 87.5 km/h.

About 23 minutes after the train rolled away from Railton, it collided with a concrete footing and surrounding fences at the end of the silo siding in the Devonport rail yard. The derailment caused significant damage to the train's locomotive and seven wagons, as well as damage to the end of the siding and fences. Fence debris struck two pedestrians who had been walking in the area, resulting in minor injuries to both.

== See also ==
- List of rail accidents
- Tasmanian Government Railways
- Rail transport in Tasmania
- Tasman Limited
- TasRail
- Rail transport in Australia
