= Florentine Junction =

Railway station in Tasmania, Australia

Coordinates: 42.761°S 146.599°E

Florentine Junction, also known as Pillinger's Creek, Risby's Junction, Florentine Rail Yard and Florentine Depot, is the terminus of the Derwent Valley Railway, a 3’ 6” narrow gauge railway that operates from New Norfolk in Tasmania, Australia. The station opened in 1936 but closed in the mid twentieth century when the railway beyond Kallista was closed.

== History ==
The Derwent Valley Railway reached Kallista on 2 July 1936, and shortly afterwards the 8 km extension to Florentine was opened. The track was used exclusively by Australian Newsprint Mills, running Tasmanian Government Railways stock. The station was used to load logs felled in the Tyenna Valley and a loading yard was built to store the Eucalyptus regnans, Eucalyptus globulus and Eucalyptus obliqua that were used primarily to supply the newsprint mill at Maydena. When road transport replaced rail, the line became uneconomical to run and repair and when Australian Newsprint Mills closed their Maydena depot in 1990, the log loading yard at Florentine was sold. The last documented rail journey to Florentine was in April 1993, when two Y locomotives, Y1 and Y5, hauled a special test train to be loaded with silica sand.

== Railtrack Riders ==
Florentine Junction is currently used by Railtrack Riders, a tourist initiative of the Maydena Community Association Inc. and which hopes to give visitors an insight into Tasmania's forestry and its railway heritage. Passengers pedal open railway carts for 2.4 km from Maydena to a purpose-built turntable at Florentine Junction which repositions the carts for the return journey. At Florentine, there is also a small museum with historic forestry displays and other historical information.

== Last Living Thylacine ==
Working with local bushman Albert Harris, renowned ‘tiger hunter’ Elias Churchill trapped a living thylacine close to Florentine Junction in 1933. Churchill built a trapping hut near to the track leading to the osmiridium mining town of Adamsfield. The thylacine was chained at the hut before being loaded onto horseback and carried to the railhead at Fitzgerald where it was taken to Beaumaris Zoo.
