= Styx, Tasmania =

Styx Tasmania
- Coordinates: 42°47′32″S 146°41′20″E
- Population: nil (2016 census)
- Postcode(s): 7140
- Location: 53 km (33 mi) W of New Norfolk
- LGA(s): Derwent Valley
- Region: South-east
- State electorate(s): Lyons
- Federal division(s): Lyons
Localities around Styx:
National Park	Fitzgerald, Maydena, Tyenna	Westerway
Southwest	Styx	Uxbridge
Southwest	Southwest	Moogara

Styx is a rural locality in the local government area (LGA) of Derwent Valley in the South-east LGA region of Tasmania. The locality is about 53 kilometres (33 mi) west of the town of New Norfolk. The 2016 census recorded a population of nil for the state suburb of Styx.

== History ==
Styx is a confirmed locality.

== Geography ==
The Styx River rises in the west of the locality and flows through to the east.

== Road infrastructure ==
Route B61 (Gordon River Road) passes to the north. From there, Styx Road provides access to the locality.
