= Derwent Valley Railway (Tasmania) =

Heritage railway in Tasmania, Australia

- TGR H2 under overhaul at New Norfolk on the 15th of August 2026

Overview
- Status: In use
- Owner: Government of Tasmania
- Termini: Bridgewater; Kallista

Service
- Type: Heavy rail
- Operator: TasRail

History
- Opened: September 1, 1887

Technical
- Track gauge: 3 ft 6 in (1,067 mm)

The Derwent Valley Railway is an inoperational heritage railway in Tasmania, Australia. Its base is in New Norfolk. It is 3' 6" narrow gauge.

== History ==
Tasmanian Government Railways opened the Derwent Valley Line in 1887. Initially, it ran from the junction at Bridgewater, on the main north–south Hobart to Devonport line, to New Norfolk, a distance of 18 kilometres. It was extended to 29 km at Plenty in 1887, and then to 41 km at Glenora in 1888. It closely follows the course of the River Derwent for the first 39 km as far as Macquarie Plains, and crosses the river at three different points.

The following years saw a number of plans to extend the line further up the Derwent Valley or to connect it to the west coast. Finally, twenty one years later, in 1909, it was extended along the Tyenna River, another 8 km to what is now Westerway. In 1917 another extension was added to extend the railway to Fitzgerald (66 km), and a final extension was opened in 1936 to Kallista, 74 km from Bridgewater. The last extension replaced an earlier wooden tramway on the same alignment. The primary usage of the line was to provide a service to the rural areas and the logging areas around Kallista. In 1940 there was a significant increase in log traffic along most of the line with the opening of a paper mill at Boyer, 14 km from Bridgewater. This increased traffic resulted in the construction of two deviations and additional facilities at a number of stations.

Sometime later, parts of the railway began to close. Firstly, the logging branches around Kallista, and then the section from Kallista to Florentine Junction were closed. In 1995, TasRail completely closed the line beyond New Norfolk after floods and heavy rain substantially damaged the track.

== Restoration ==
In 1990, Derwent Valley Railway Preservation Society was formed. It purchased the assets of the Tasmanian Locomotive Company, who had been operating excursion trains on the line. The Society established its operating base at New Norfolk, although initially operating out of the Hobart suburb of Claremont. It continued operating passenger trains on the line to Maydena. The Derwent Valley Line was closed beyond New Norfolk in 1995, and so the Society operated to other destinations. Although the line remained under Tasrail ownership, in 1999 the line was reopened by the society to Hayes, then in 2000 to Westerway and then to National Park in 2003 (37 km from New Norfolk). The society now trades as Derwent Valley Railway Inc. The Society now has 11 locomotives (4 steam, 4 diesel-electric, 1 diesel-hydraulic and 2 diesel-mechanical), 9 carriages, and 11 wagons.

Two of Tasrail's freight services regularly used the section from Bridgewater to the Norske Skog paper mill at Boyer, carrying paper to Burnie for export, and the other supplying the plant with coal and timber from the north of the state.

== The present ==
In October 2005, Pacific National, who had taken over commercial running of the TasRail network, closed the Derwent Valley Line west of New Norfolk. This effectively stopped the running of the heritage railway. In May 2006, Pacific National came to a new agreement with the Tasmanian Government which included returning all tracks and rail lands to government ownership.

Derwent Valley Railway Inc. are currently in negotiations to regain access to the Derwent Valley Line with a view to restoring it to operation for tourist trains.

The Derwent Valley Railway is currently restoring a short section of their line in the New Norfolk yards between Black River Road and Third Avenue, with plans to restore the line around 3km towards Boyer once trains are running in the yard, with hopes to one day run trains much furthur up the line to Westerway and National Park.

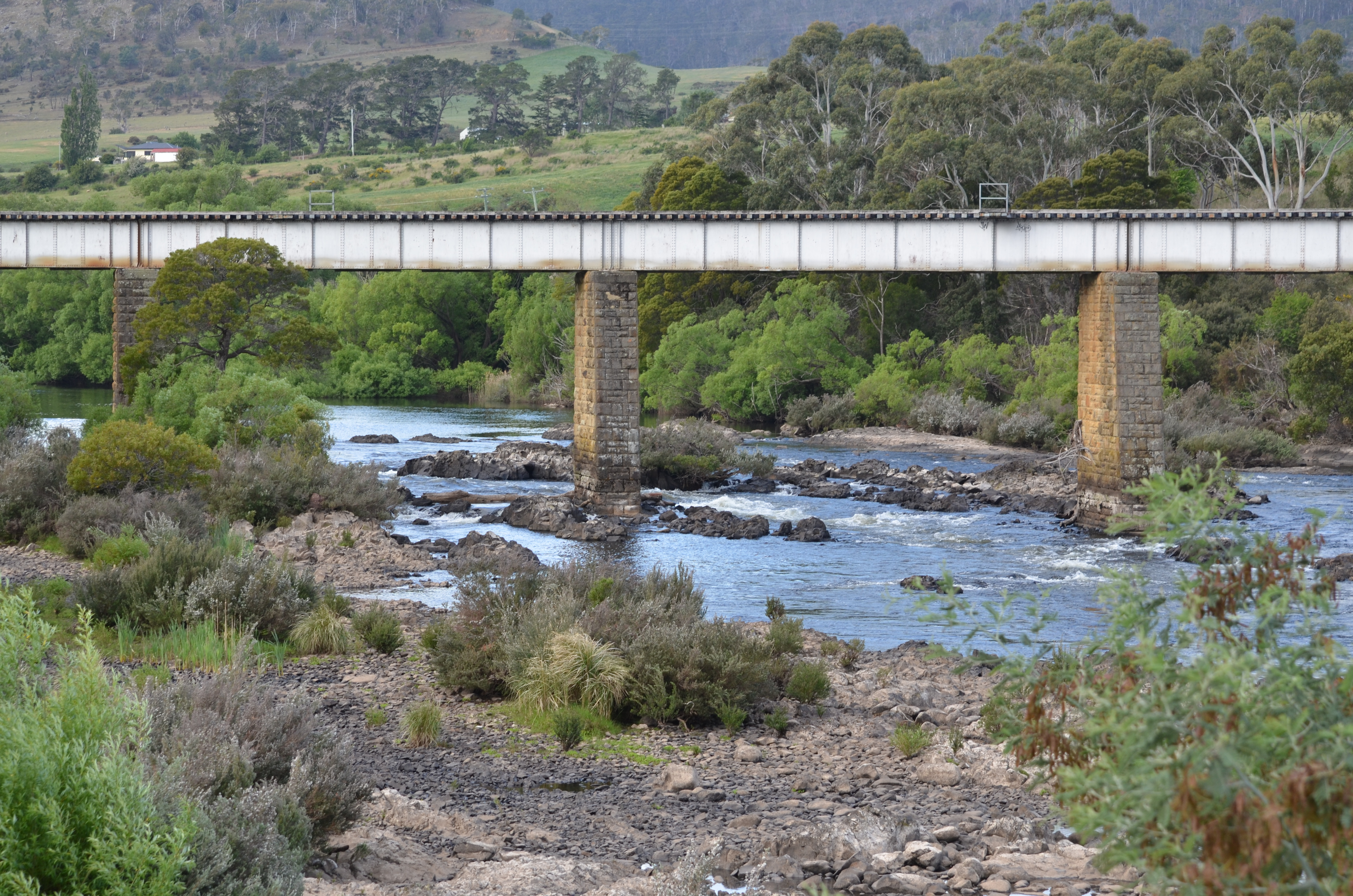
A railway bridge on the Derwent Valley Railway

== See also ==
- Rail transport in Tasmania
