= Westerway railway station =

Railway station in Tasmania, Australia

Coordinates: 42.6824°S 146.7842°E

Westerway Railway Station is a railway station in the settlement of Westerway on the Derwent Valley Railway in Tasmania, Australia. The station was built in 1909 after the track was extended from Glenore.

The station was the starting point for the pack horse journey to the Adamsfield osmiridium mine. As the timber industry became more important to the area, sawmills were built and the railway was used to transport logs to Boyer and Hobart. By the 1990s, alternative transportation made the continued use of the railway unprofitable and by 1995, no trains ran beyond New Norfolk. However, the Derwent Valley Railway was, until recently, used by tourists to visit the area.

The Westerway station building has been restored by volunteers at the Derwent Valley Railway.
