= Westerway, Tasmania =

Locality in Tasmania, Australia

Westerway
- Town
- Coordinates: 42°41′S 146°47′E
- Country: Australia
- State: Tasmania
- Region: Central, South-east
- LGA: Central Highlands, Derwent Valley
- Location: 65 km (40 mi) NW of Hobart; 29 km (18 mi) NW of New Norfolk; 20 km (12 mi) NE of Maydena

Government
  - State electorate: Lyons
  - Federal division: Lyons

Population
  - Total: 225 (2016 census)
- Postcode: 7140
Localities around Westerway
Fentonbury	Fentonbury, Meadowbank	Meadowbank
National Park, Fentonbury	Westerway	Glenora, Bushy Park, Meadowbank
National Park, Styx	Styx, Uxbridge	Uxbridge

Westerway is a rural locality in the local government areas (LGA) of Central Highlands and Derwent Valley in the Central and South-east LGA regions of Tasmania. The locality is about 29 kilometres (18 mi) north-west of the town of New Norfolk. The 2016 census recorded a population of 225 for the state suburb of Westerway.

== History ==
Westerway was originally known as Russell or Russelldale and was named after surgeon J J Russell, one of the party who discovered a set of waterfalls 3 km from Fenton Forest. (These are not the present day Russell Falls.) The Derwent Valley Railway line reached the town in 1909. Russell Post Office opened on 1 October 1910 and was renamed Westerway in 1919.

Due to confusion between the town of Russell and Russell Falls further up the road, the town's name was changed in 1919 to Westerway. It was named by, and after, W H Westerway (1851–1930), the main resident of the town who was responsible for many developments in the area. He built an accommodation house and store where Coniston siding is now, owned the Coffee Palace at Glenora and started a livery business driving tourists to Russell Falls.

Westerway School opened in 1920 with thirty-six students. From 1920 to 1960 there was a bakery and, from 1947 to 1970, a police station. At the time of the 1934 bushfires, the original Westerway Hall became a temporary hospital and in 1939 a recruitment office for enlistees. That hall was pulled down and rebuilt in 1940. The present hall replaced the 1940 hall after it burnt down.

Westerway railway station was important as it was the starting point for the pack horse journey to the long abandoned Adamsfield osmiridium mine. As the timber industry became more important to the area, a sawmill was built and the number of timber mills in the area increased and the train line was used to transport logs to Boyer and Hobart. The Derwent Valley Railway was, until recently, used by tourists to visit the area.

Westerway was gazetted as a locality in 1959.

== Geography ==
The Tyenna River flows through from west to east.

== Road infrastructure ==
Route B91 (Gordon River Road) passes through from east to west. Route C608 (Ellendale Road) starts at an intersection with B91 and runs north-west until it exits.
