= Fitzgerald, Tasmania =

Fitzgerald Tasmania
- Coordinates: 42°45′13″S 146°39′44″E
- Population: 38 (2016 census)
- Postcode(s): 7140
- Location: 47 km (29 mi) W of New Norfolk
- LGA(s): Derwent Valley
- Region: South-east
- State electorate(s): Lyons
- Federal division(s): Lyons
Localities around Fitzgerald:
Tyenna	Tyenna	Tyenna
Maydena	Fitzgerald	Tyenna
Styx	Styx	Styx

Fitzgerald is a rural locality in the local government area (LGA) of Derwent Valley in the South-east LGA region of Tasmania. The locality is about 47 kilometres (29 mi) west of the town of New Norfolk. The 2016 census recorded a population of 38 for the state suburb of Fitzgerald.

== History ==
Fitzgerald was gazetted as a locality in 1959.

== Geography ==
The Tyenna River forms the north-western boundary.

== Road infrastructure ==
Route B61 (Gordon River Road) runs through from north-east to north-west.
