= Florentine, Tasmania =

Florentine Tasmania
- Coordinates: 42°35′02″S 146°28′31″E
- Population: nil (2016 census)
- Postcode(s): 7140
- Location: 81 km (50 mi) NW of New Norfolk
- LGA(s): Central Highlands, Derwent Valley
- Region: Central, South-east
- State electorate(s): Lyons
- Federal division(s): Lyons
Localities around Florentine:
Southwest	Wayatinah	Ouse
Southwest	Florentine	Ouse, Ellendale, Mount Field, Maydena
Southwest	Southwest	Southwest

Florentine is a rural locality in the local government areas of Central Highlands and Derwent Valley in the Central and South-east regions of Tasmania. It is located about 81 kilometres (50 mi) north-west of the town of New Norfolk. The 2016 census determined a population of nil for the state suburb of Florentine.

== History ==
Florentine is a confirmed suburb/locality.

== Geography ==
The Florentine River flows through from south-west to north.

== Road infrastructure ==
The B61 route (Gordon River Road) passes through the south-east corner. Route C607 (Scotts Peak Dam Road) starts at an intersection with B61 on the southern boundary and runs away to the south.
