= Fentonbury, Tasmania =

Fentonbury Tasmania
- Coordinates: 42°39′10″S 146°45′38″E
- Population: 71 (2016 census)
- Postcode(s): 7140
- Location: 28 km (17 mi) S of Hamilton
- LGA(s): Central Highlands
- Region: Central
- State electorate(s): Lyons
- Federal division(s): Lyons
Localities around Fentonbury:
Ellendale	Ellendale	Meadowbank
Ellendale	Fentonbury	Westerway
National Park	Westerway, National Park	Westerway

Fentonbury is a rural locality in the local government area (LGA) of Central Highlands in the Central LGA region of Tasmania. The locality is about 28 kilometres (17 mi) south of the town of Hamilton. The 2016 census recorded a population of 71 for the state suburb of Fentonbury.

== History ==
Fentonbury was gazetted as a locality in 1959. The name is believed to come from a settler named Michael Fenton in the district in 1830.

== Geography ==
Almost all the boundaries are survey lines.

== Road infrastructure ==
Route C608 (Ellendale Road) runs through from north-west to south-east.
