= Mount Field, Tasmania =

Mount Field Tasmania
- Coordinates: 42°39′57″S 146°35′07″E
- Population: 3 (2016 census)
- Postcode(s): 7140
- Location: 38 km (24 mi) NW of New Norfolk
- LGA(s): Central Highlands, Derwent Valley
- Region: Central, South-east
- State electorate(s): Lyons
- Federal division(s): Lyons
Localities around Mount Field:
Florentine	Florentine	Ellendale
Florentine	Mount Field	National Park
Maydena	Maydena	Tyenna

Mount Field is a rural locality in the local government areas of Central Highlands and Derwent Valley in the Central and South-east regions of Tasmania. It is located about 38 kilometres (24 mi) north-west of the town of New Norfolk. The 2016 census determined a population of 3 for the state suburb of Mount Field.

== History ==
Mount Field is a confirmed suburb/locality.

== Etymology ==
It is believed that the locality was named for Mount Field National Park, which was named for Judge Barron Field, who visited Tasmania as an itinerant judge in 1819 and 1821.

== Geography ==
The locality is almost wholly contained within Mount Field National Park.

== Road infrastructure ==
The C609 route (Lake Dobson Road) enters from the east and runs generally west to Lake Dobson, where it terminates.
