= Ernie Bond =

Ernie or Ernest Bond may refer to:

- Ernie Bond (bushman) (1891–1962), Tasmanian bushman who lived at Gordonvale
- Ernie Bond (footballer) (1929–2025), English footballer
- Ernie Bond (politician) (1897–1984), Australian politician
- Ernest Radcliffe Bond (1919–2003), British police officer and soldier
