= Ellendale, Tasmania =

Ellendale Tasmania
- Coordinates: 42°37′S 146°43′E
- Population: 241 (2016 census)
- Postcode(s): 7140
- Location: 22 km (14 mi) SW of Hamilton
- LGA(s): Central Highlands Council
- Region: Central
- County: Australia
- State electorate(s): Lyons
- Federal division(s): Lyons
Localities around Ellendale:
Florentine	Ouse	Hamilton
Florentine	Ellendale	Meadowbank
Mount Field	National Park, Mount Field	Fentonbury

Ellendale is a rural locality in the local government area (LGA) of Central Highlands in the Central LGA region of Tasmania. The locality is about 22 kilometres (14 mi) south-west of the town of Hamilton. The 2016 census recorded a population of 241 for the state suburb of Ellendale. It is a village in Tasmania 75 kilometres from Hobart in the Derwent Valley.

== History ==
Ellendale was gazetted as a locality in 1959. The locality was named for the wife of Nicholas John Brown, who was the Minister for Lands and Works when it was surveyed.

Ellendale Post Office opened on 16 April 1880.

== Geography ==
The River Derwent (Meadowbank Lake) forms part of the north-eastern boundary, while the Broad River forms the north-western. The Jones River flows through from south to north.

== Road infrastructure ==
Route C608 (Ellendale Road) runs through from north to south-east.
