= Ernie Bond (bushman) =

Ernie Bond, an osmiridium miner and bushman, who was sometimes called the Prince of Rasselas in reference to Samuel Johnson's book Rasselas, lived for 17 years at Gordonvale, his home in the Vale of Rasselas, Tasmania.

== Early life ==
Ernest Bond was born in Hobart, Tasmania, on 26 July 1891 to Frank Bond (1856–1931) and his wife, Sarah Emma Cowburn. His father was a bark-mill owner, property developer, and a politician, first in the House of Assembly (1903–1906) and the Legislative Council (1909–1921).

== Adamsfield and the beginnings of Gordonvale ==
In September 1927, Bond began working a mining lease at Adamsfield where he sought osmiridium. After seven years as a miner, in March 1934 he ventured into the Vale of Rasselas accompanied by Paddy Hartnett and eventually purchased 81 hectares of land at a place he named Gordonvale, 14 km north of Adamsfield. A homestead was built and part of the land was cleared for fruit and vegetable gardens. He grazed sheep (unsuccessfully), had cows for milk and butter, and kept bees for honey. In 1937 he began selling vegetables and jars of preserved fruit to the shops at Adamsfield. At times, he employed as many as six men to help with the work.

Dad had a Vacola bottling outfit, and would preserve hundreds of bottles of raspberries, strawberries, gooseberries and blackcurrants. Then he’d carry them over to Adamsfield to sell, and he’d also make wonderful pies.

== Gordonvale Buildings ==
With the help of Paddy Hartnett and Bill Powell, Bond erected the homestead at Gordonvale in two months, practically all the timber being split from one big tree. The building consisted of two bedrooms and a living room. The other two huts ("Office" and "Love Nest") were built by Bond as time permitted, sometime after 1940.

== Access across the Gordon River ==
Until a footbridge was built over the Gordon River in 1936, all food and gear had to be man-packed in from Fitzgerald via the Adamsfield Track. The bridge was destroyed by fire in February 1950, and was subsequently replaced by a flying fox. The flying fox is no longer operational, though its remains are still on the southern bank of the Gordon River.

== Visits by bushwalkers ==
Bushwalkers were rare visitors to Gordonvale until after World War 2. Keith Lancaster describes one such visit at Christmas, 1947:

The route varied little until Gordonvale came in sight with its… subsidiary huts and cultivation. The couple of fences were soon left behind and, with a feeling of hope and interest at my reception, I was rapping on the door intent upon making the hermit’s acquaintance.
Any doubts as to the outcome of my intrusion were soon dispelled as this hefty, bearded six-footer welcomed me inside and poured forth his unstinted hospitality. Imagine my delight at being pressed to the table for the evening meal in company with his other guests, the Steane family, and how I responded to the tasty mutton and vegetables he packed before me… Sensing my delight and amazement at the excellence of the fare, Ern Bond’s grey eyes twinkled and his face wreathed under the pointed beard as he remarked, "Yes, we do ourselves fairly well here".

== Leaving Gordonvale ==
The loss of the bridge over the Gordon effectively severed Bond's access to supplies, and because of his age (Bond was now in his sixties), carrying in supplies was no longer an option. He left Gordonvale in February 1952 with all his livestock – except for a bull which refused to cross the Gordon River.

Another reason for Bond's decision to leave Gordonvale was described in The Tasmanian Tramp:

Ernie Bond, host to may hundreds of walkers at his homestead "Gordonvale" in the Vale of Rasselas, has left his valley to live near Hobart at Austins Ferry on the Derwent. A period of ill-health in the winter of 1951 indicated to him that it would not be wise to continue with his hermit's existence. In the summer and early autumn of 1952, members from our club and the Launceston Walking Club assisted Ernie by packing out his personal goods to the Florentine.

Upon leaving Gordonvale, Bond gave a joint five-year lease to the Hobart Walking Club and the Launceston Walking Club. The clubs were to be responsible for the maintenance of the homestead buildings.

After Gordonvale, Bond conducted a fruit stall at Austins Ferry (a suburb of Hobart), and died at St. John's Park, an aged-care facility, on 1 May 1962, aged 70. His diaries are held by LINC Tasmania.

== Nature Reserve ==
Gordonvale was purchased by the Tasmanian Land Conservancy in 2013 as a permanent nature reserve.

== Sources ==
- http://bushwalk.com/forum/viewtopic.php?f=3&t=6252&p=82579#p82579
- Tasmania 40° South, Issue No. 18: The Prince of the Rasselas, Ken McKracken; Ernie Bond, legendary bushman of the South-West.
