= Meadowbank, Tasmania =

Meadowbank
- Town
- Coordinates: 42°38′07″S 146°50′54″E
- Country: Australia
- State: Tasmania
- Region: Central
- LGA: Central Highlands
- Location: 37 km (23 mi) S of Hamilton

Government
  - State electorate: Lyons
  - Federal division: Lyons

Population
  - Total: 10 (2016 census)
- Postcode: 7140
Localities around Meadowbank
Ellendale	Hamilton	Hamilton
Fentonbury	Meadowbank	Gretna
Westerway	Glenora	Gretna

Meadowbank is a rural locality in the local government area of Central Highlands in the Central region of Tasmania. The locality is about 37 kilometres (23 mi) south of the town of Hamilton. The 2016 census recorded a population of 10 for the state suburb of Meadowbank.

== History ==
Meadowbank was gazetted as a locality in 1966. The name was that of a property granted to an early settler.

== Geography ==
The River Derwent forms the eastern boundary. The Meadowbank Dam and Meadowbank Power Station are on this section of the river, and the water impounded by the dam is named Meadowbank Lake.
