= Adamsfield =

Locality in Tasmania, Australia

Coordinates: 42°44′S 146°19′E

Adamsfield is a locality in Tasmania, Australia, where osmiridium was discovered in 1925.

The name of Adam River Field or Adam's River Field preceded that of Adamsfield. Alluvial mining resulted in one of the world's largest sources of osmium and iridium metal at the time of activity in the 1920s. Florentine Post Office opened on 1 November 1925. It was renamed "Adamsfield" the next month and closed in 1960.
