= National Park, Tasmania =

National Park Tasmania
- Coordinates: 42°41′20″S 146°42′44″E
- Population: 73 (2016 census)
- Postcode(s): 7140
- Location: 38 km (24 mi) NW of New Norfolk
- LGA(s): Central Highlands, Derwent Valley
- Region: Central, South-east
- State electorate(s): Lyons
- Federal division(s): Lyons
Localities around National Park:
Ellendale	Ellendale	Westerway
Mount Field, Tyenna	National Park	Styx
Maydena	Styx	Styx

National Park is a rural locality in the local government areas of Central Highlands and Derwent Valley in the Central and South-east regions of Tasmania. It is located about 38 kilometres (24 mi) north-west of the town of New Norfolk. The 2016 census determined a population of 73 for the state suburb of National Park. National Park is the closest locality to Mount Field National Park.

== History ==
National Park was gazetted as a locality in 1959.

== Geography ==
The Tyenna River enters from the west and flows through to the north-east.

== Road infrastructure ==
The B61 route (Gordon River Road) enters from the north-east and runs through to the west, following the river, until it exits. Route C609 (Lake Dobson Road) starts at an intersection with B61 and exits to the north-west.
