= Australian Newsprint Mills =

Former Australian newsprint manufacturer

- Industry: Manufacturing
- Founded: 1938
- Number of locations: 2
- Products: Newsprint

Australian Newsprint Mills (ANM) was an Australian newsprint manufacturer.

== History ==
Australian Newsprint Mills was established in 1938 to build a newsprint manufacturing plant adjacent to the River Derwent at Boyer, Tasmania. Its founding chairman was Keith Murdoch. The plant opened in February 1941.

In August 1972, John Fairfax purchased News Limited's shareholding. By 1978, the major shareholders were the Herald & Weekly Times with 46% and John Fairfax with 35%. In August 1981 a second plant opened in Albury, New South Wales.

In March 1988 Fletcher Challenge purchased John Fairfax's 50% shareholding. The company was sold to Norske Skog in April 2000.
