= Tyenna, Tasmania =

Tyenna Tasmania
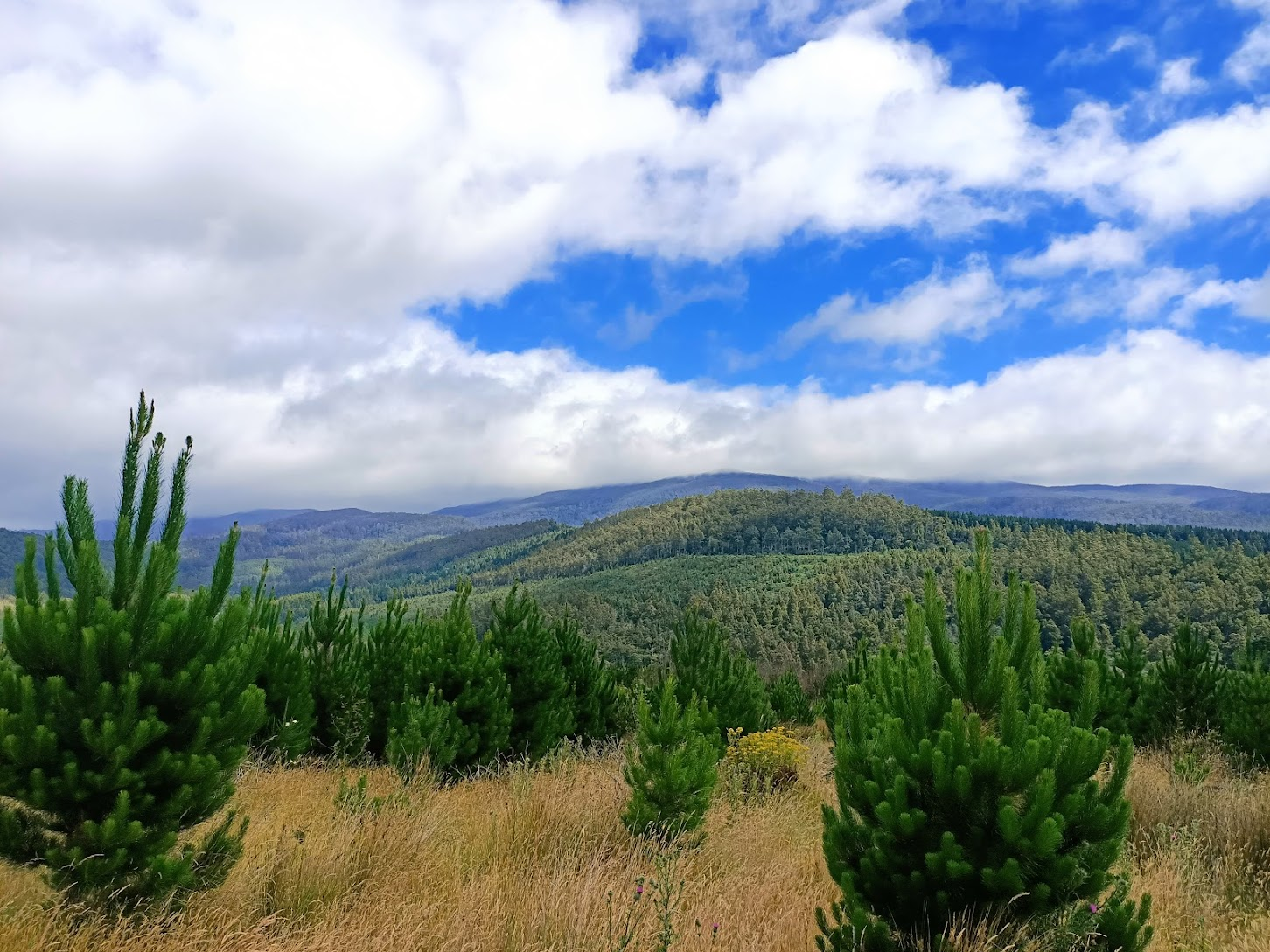
- View towards Mount Field over a Pinus radiata plantation.

- Coordinates: 42°44′S 146°40′E
- Population: 43 (2016 census)
- Postcode(s): 7140
- Location: 81 km (50 mi) W of Hobart; 44 km (27 mi) W of New Norfolk; 15 km (9 mi) NE of Maydena
- LGA(s): Derwent Valley Council
- Region: South-east
- State electorate(s): Lyons
- Federal division(s): Lyons
Localities around Tyenna:
Mount Field	Mount Field	National Park
Mount Field	Tyenna	National Park
Maydena	Maydena, Fitzgerald	National Park

Tyenna is a rural locality in the local government area (LGA) of Derwent Valley in the South-east LGA region of Tasmania. The locality is about 44 kilometres (27 mi) west of the town of New Norfolk. The 2016 census recorded a population of 43 for the state suburb of Tyenna. It is a settlement on the Tyenna River in Tasmania, located 81 kilometres (50 mi) west of the state capital, Hobart and is currently but a remnant of a once thriving rural community.

== History ==
Tyenna was gazetted as a locality in 1959. The name is believed to be an Aboriginal word for “bandicoot”. Tyenna was mentioned as early as 1896, when Mr. T. Stephens presented a paper to the Royal Society of Tasmania on possible land routes to the west coast of the island.

Many settlers had already settled and started to clear the heavy forest in the area when it was officially gazetted as a town in 1918. Early timber fellers established sawmills in the area. The mills were reliant on the Tyenna River and Marriots Falls Creek for steam power. Before the establishment of the towns of Fitzgerald and Maydena it was the resupply base for Adamsfield for osmiridium miners travelling McCullum's Track. At its peak it boasted at least two hotels, two dance halls, a combined shop and post-office, a school, cricket ground, a blacksmith's shop, sawmills and Millars Timber and Trading Company. During the 1930s hops were grown along the river, processed in oast houses and sent on the rail to Hobart. Raspberries, currants and other produce also went by rail to Hobart.

Tyenna Post Office opened on 1 August 1893 and closed in 1957.

Bushfires have since claimed much of old Tyenna, but there are still many small holdings along the main road. In spring, these farms are ablaze with Vansion daffodils that have naturalised.

== Geography ==
Most of the boundaries are survey lines or ridge lines.

== Road infrastructure ==
Route B61 (Gordon River Road) runs through from north-east to south-east.
