= Osmiridium =

Alloy of iridium and osmium

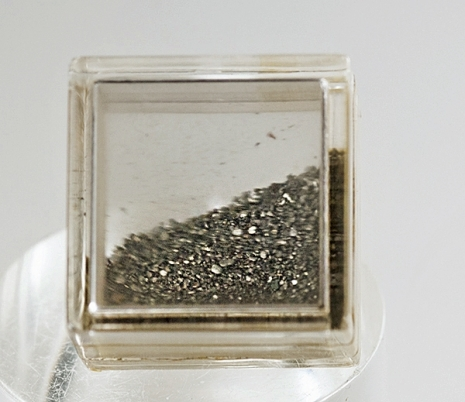
Osmiridium-564562

Osmiridium and iridosmine are natural alloys of the elements osmium and iridium, with traces of other platinum-group metals.

Osmiridium has been defined as containing a higher proportion of iridium, with iridosmine containing more osmium. However, as the content of the natural Os-Ir alloys varies considerably, the constituent percentages of specimens often reflects the reverse situation of osmiridium describing specimens containing a higher proportion of osmium and iridosmine specimens containing more iridium.

== Nomenclature ==
In 1963, M. H. Hey proposed using iridosmine for hexagonal specimens with 32% < Os < 80%, osmiridium for cubic specimens with Os < 32% and native osmium for specimens Os > 80% (the would-be mineral native iridium of >80% purity was not known at that time).

In 1973, Harris and Cabri defined the following names for Os-Ir-Ru alloys: ruthenosmiridium was applied to cubic Os-Ir-Ru alloys, where Ir < 80% of (Os+Ir+Ru) and Ru > 10% of (Os+Ir+Ru) with no single other element >10% of the total; Rutheniridosmine was applied to cubic Os-Ir-Ru alloys, where Os < 80% of (Os+Ir+Ru) and Ru is 10–80% of (Os+Ir+Ru) with no single other element >10% of the total; the Ru-Os alloys be known as ruthenian osmium (>50% Os), osmian ruthenium (>50% Ru); the Ru-Ir alloys be known as iridian ruthenium and ruthenian iridium where the boundary between them is defined by the alloy's miscibility gap (a minimum 57% Ir for ruthenian iridium and a minimum of 55% Ru for iridian ruthenium).

The nomenclature of Os-Ir-Ru alloys were revised again by Harris and Cabri in 1991. Afterwards, only four names were applied to minerals whose compositions lie within the ternary Os-Ir-Ru system: osmium (native osmium) for all hexagonal alloys with Os the major element; iridium (native iridium) for all cubic alloys with iridium the major element; rutheniridosmine for all hexagonal alloys with Ir the major element; and ruthenium (native ruthenium) for all hexagonal alloys with Ru the major element. The mineral names iridosmine, osmiridium, rutheniridosmium, ruthenian osmium, osmian ruthenium, ruthenium iridium and iridian ruthenium were proposed to be retired.

== Related compounds ==
Natural alloys also occur in the systems Ir-Os-Rh, Os-Ir-Pt, Ru-Ir-Pt, Ir-Ru-Rh and Pd-Ir-Pt. Names used in these systems have included platiniridium (or platinian iridium) and iridrhodruthenium. However, there is no universally accepted method of plotting these compositions and their names, especially in the ternary systems.

== Properties ==
The properties of all these alloys generally fall between those of the members, but hardness is greater than the individual constituents.

== Occurrence ==
Os-Ir alloys are very rare, but can be found in mines of other platinum-group metals. One very productive mine was operated at Adamsfield near Tyenna in Tasmania during the Second World War with the ore shipped out by railway from Maydena. The total osmiridium production for 1940 to 1945 for the whole of Tasmania was 34.7 kg. The site of the mine is now totally reclaimed by dense natural bush. It was once one of the world's major producers of this rare metal, and the osmiridium was mostly found in shallow alluvial workings.

== Isolation ==
It can be isolated by adding a piece to aqua regia, which has the ability to dissolve gold and platinum but not osmiridium. It occurs naturally as small, extremely hard, flat metallic grains with hexagonal crystal structure.
