= Maydena =

Locality in Tasmania, Australia

Maydena Tasmania
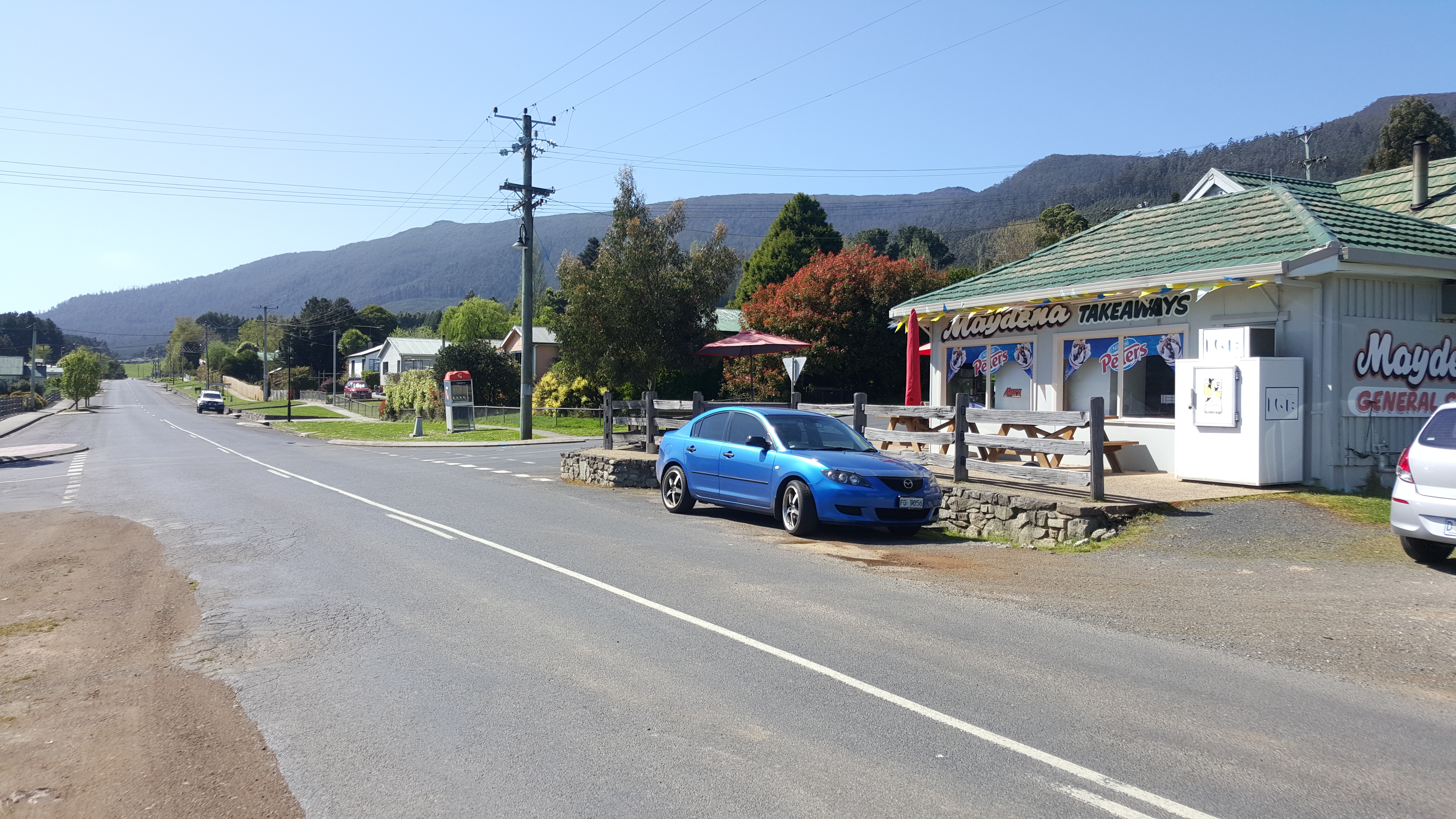
- Looking east on main road

- Coordinates: 42°45′19″S 146°37′36″E
- Population: 198 (2021 census)
- Postcode(s): 7140
- Elevation: 281 m (922 ft)
- Location: 87 km (54 mi) W of Hobart; 52 km (32 mi) W of New Norfolk
- LGA(s): Derwent Valley Council
- State electorate(s): Lyons
- Federal division(s): Lyons
Mean max temp	Mean min temp	Annual rainfall
16.1 °C; 61 °F	5.2 °C; 41 °F	1,201.5 mm 47.3 in

Maydena is a locality in Tasmania, Australia, alongside the River Tyenna.

Maydena is on the Gordon River Road, south west of New Norfolk, through the Bushy Park Hop Fields, turn left at Westerway, past Mount Field National Park and Russell Falls, through Tyenna and Fitzgerald townships and then up to Maydena itself. Gordon River Road continues to Lake Pedder, Lake Gordon and Strathgordon, in the Southwest National Park of Tasmania. Maydena was formerly called Junee and was a small settlement that provided access to Adamsfield Osmiridium mining in the early 1900s. In 1947–1950 Australian Newsprint Mills built 100 houses for the workers of the forestry operations of Australian Newsprint Mill to provide timber for the production of newsprint at their newsprint Mill in Boyer, Tasmania.

At the 1954 Census Maydena had a population of 518 with a further 60 at the Maydena Newsprint Camp. At the 2021 census, Maydena had a population of 198.

Maydena's state primary school and a community online centre have now been closed.

== History ==
The 3 ft 6 in (1,067 mm) gauge railway line in Maydena was once used for hauling timber and osmiridium ore, as well as a way point for Hydro Tasmania to build the Gordon River Road to Strathgordon and the construction of the Lake Gordon Dam for the Gordon Power Station, the largest in Tasmania. The railway ceased operation in 1991 and a portion of the disused rail track is now being used by a pedal powered 'Railtrack Riders' tourist attraction. Maydena Post Office opened on 1 May 1944.

=== Maydena Bike Park ===
The Maydena Bike Park (MBP) is a gravity-focused Mountain bike park. The park was originally conceptualized in 2008, before officially opening on 26 January 2018. The park encircles the southern side of the township, and has been able to successfully restore and re-use some buildings like the old School.

Owned and operated by Dirt Art, the Park is now one of the largest employers and a significant driver of tourism to the area. In addition to recreational riding, MBP also hosts events ranging from social Friday-evening Downhill through summer to invite only, internationally viewed flagship events such as RedBull Hardline.

== Climate ==
Maydena has a cool, rainy oceanic climate (Köppen Cfb). Some winter nights drop below freezing, the average winter daytime temperatures average between 8 °C (46.4 °F) and 15 °C (59 °F). The summer is mild with temperatures averaging around 5 °C (41 °F) to 12 °C (53.6 °F) at night rising to 15 °C (59 °F) to 28 °C (82.4 °F) during the day. Rainfall averaged 1,187.9 millimetres (46.77 in) annually and an average of 219.3 days of rainfall.

During the period 1992 to 2020, Maydena's record high of 38.2 °C (100.8 °F) was recorded on 31 January 2020, and the record low of −4.2 °C (24.4 °F) was recorded on 6 June 2006.

Climate data for Maydena Post Office (281 m AMSL)
Month	Jan	Feb	Mar	Apr	May	Jun	Jul	Aug	Sep	Oct	Nov	Dec	Year
Record high °C (°F)	38.2 (100.8)	35.9 (96.6)	37.3 (99.1)	30.1 (86.2)	25.3 (77.5)	18.9 (66.0)	17.9 (64.2)	22.1 (71.8)	26.9 (80.4)	30.0 (86.0)	33.0 (91.4)	36.3 (97.3)	38.2 (100.8)
Mean daily maximum °C (°F)	22.3 (72.1)	22.1 (71.8)	19.6 (67.3)	16.0 (60.8)	13.0 (55.4)	10.8 (51.4)	10.6 (51.1)	11.9 (53.4)	13.7 (56.7)	15.8 (60.4)	18.0 (64.4)	19.8 (67.6)	16.1 (61.0)
Daily mean °C (°F)	15.6 (60.1)	15.6 (60.1)	13.5 (56.3)	10.8 (51.4)	8.8 (47.8)	6.8 (44.2)	6.4 (43.5)	7.2 (45.0)	8.6 (47.5)	10.2 (50.4)	12.3 (54.1)	13.7 (56.7)	10.8 (51.4)
Mean daily minimum °C (°F)	9.1 (48.4)	8.8 (47.8)	7.2 (45.0)	5.6 (42.1)	4.3 (39.7)	2.7 (36.9)	2.3 (36.1)	2.5 (36.5)	3.5 (38.3)	4.7 (40.5)	6.5 (43.7)	7.8 (46.0)	5.4 (41.7)
Record low °C (°F)	−0.4 (31.3)	−1.0 (30.2)	−3.9 (25.0)	−1.8 (28.8)	−3.4 (25.9)	−4.2 (24.4)	−3.7 (25.3)	−3.8 (25.2)	−3.4 (25.9)	−3.2 (26.2)	−1.5 (29.3)	−0.6 (30.9)	−4.2 (24.4)
Average precipitation mm (inches)	58.9 (2.32)	62.2 (2.45)	71.1 (2.80)	80.3 (3.16)	102.5 (4.04)	97.1 (3.82)	121.9 (4.80)	151.3 (5.96)	129.9 (5.11)	114.8 (4.52)	91.1 (3.59)	86.2 (3.39)	1,168.6 (46.01)
Average precipitation days (≥ 0.2 mm)	12.4	11.3	15.4	16.8	20.3	19.1	22.1	23.0	21.1	19.2	15.8	15.6	212.1
Average rainy days (≥ 1 mm)	9.0	8.5	10.8	11.9	13.4	12.7	15.6	16.9	16.3	15.0	12.1	12.0	154.2
Average afternoon relative humidity (%)	55	55	61	69	75	81	78	71	66	61	59	59	66
