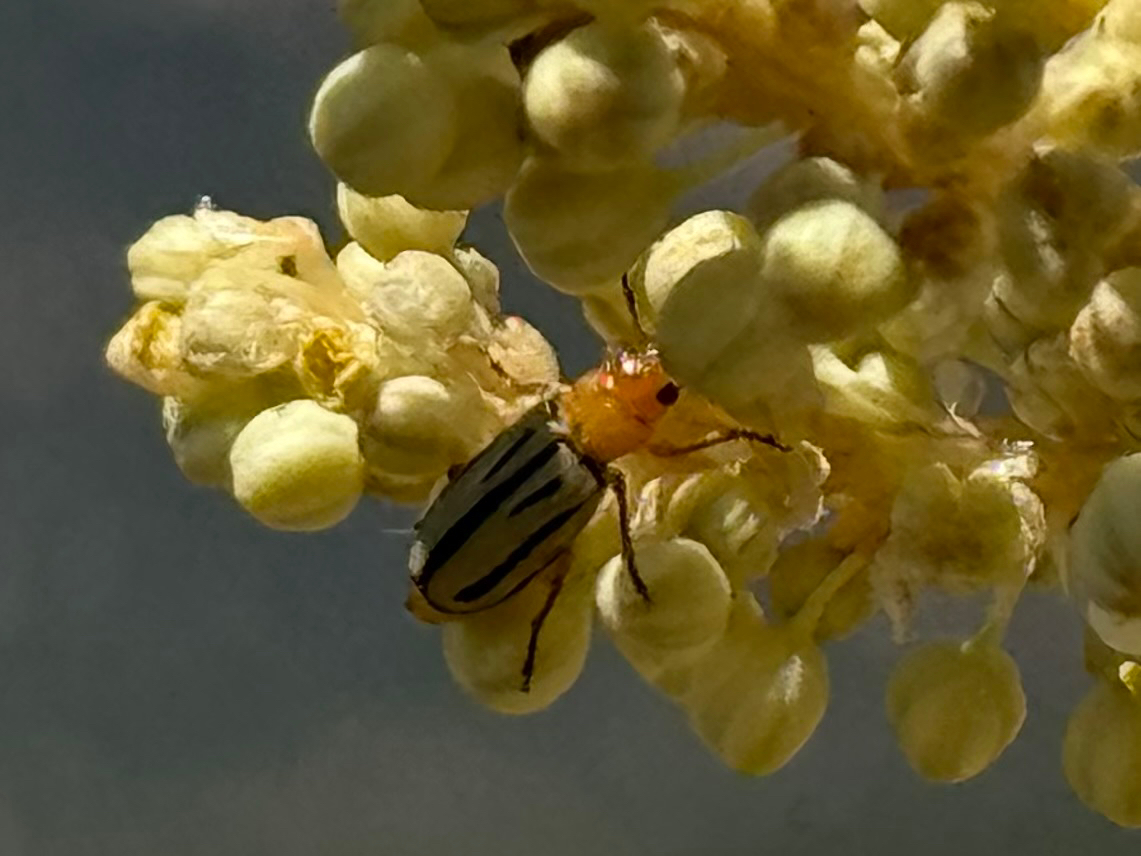
- Triarius trivittatus

Scientific classification
- Kingdom: Animalia
- Phylum: Arthropoda
- Clade: Pancrustacea
- Class: Insecta
- Order: Coleoptera
- Suborder: Polyphaga
- Infraorder: Cucujiformia
- Family: Chrysomelidae
- Subfamily: Galerucinae
- Tribe: Luperini
- Genus: Triarius; Jacoby, 1887

= Triarius (beetle) =

Genus of beetles

Triarius is a genus of skeletonizing leaf beetles in the family Chrysomelidae. There are about seven described species in Triarius. They are found in North America and Mexico.

== Species ==
These seven species belong to the genus Triarius:

- Triarius lividus (J. L. LeConte, 1884)
- Triarius melanolomatus (Blake, 1942)
- Triarius nigroflavus E. Riley, S. Clark & Gilbert, 2001
- Triarius pini
- Triarius texanus Clark & Anderson, 2019
- Triarius trivittatus Horn, 1893
- Triarius vittipennis (Horn, 1893)
