= Triariodes admiratio =

Scientific classification
- Kingdom: Animalia
- Phylum: Arthropoda
- Clade: Pancrustacea
- Class: Insecta
- Order: Coleoptera
- Suborder: Polyphaga
- Infraorder: Cucujiformia
- Family: Chrysomelidae
- Genus: Triariodes
- Species: T. admiratio

Binomial name
- Triariodes admiratio Clark & Anderson, 2019

Species of beetle

Triariodes admiratio is a species of beetle of the family Chrysomelidae. It is found in Mexico (Aguascalientes).
