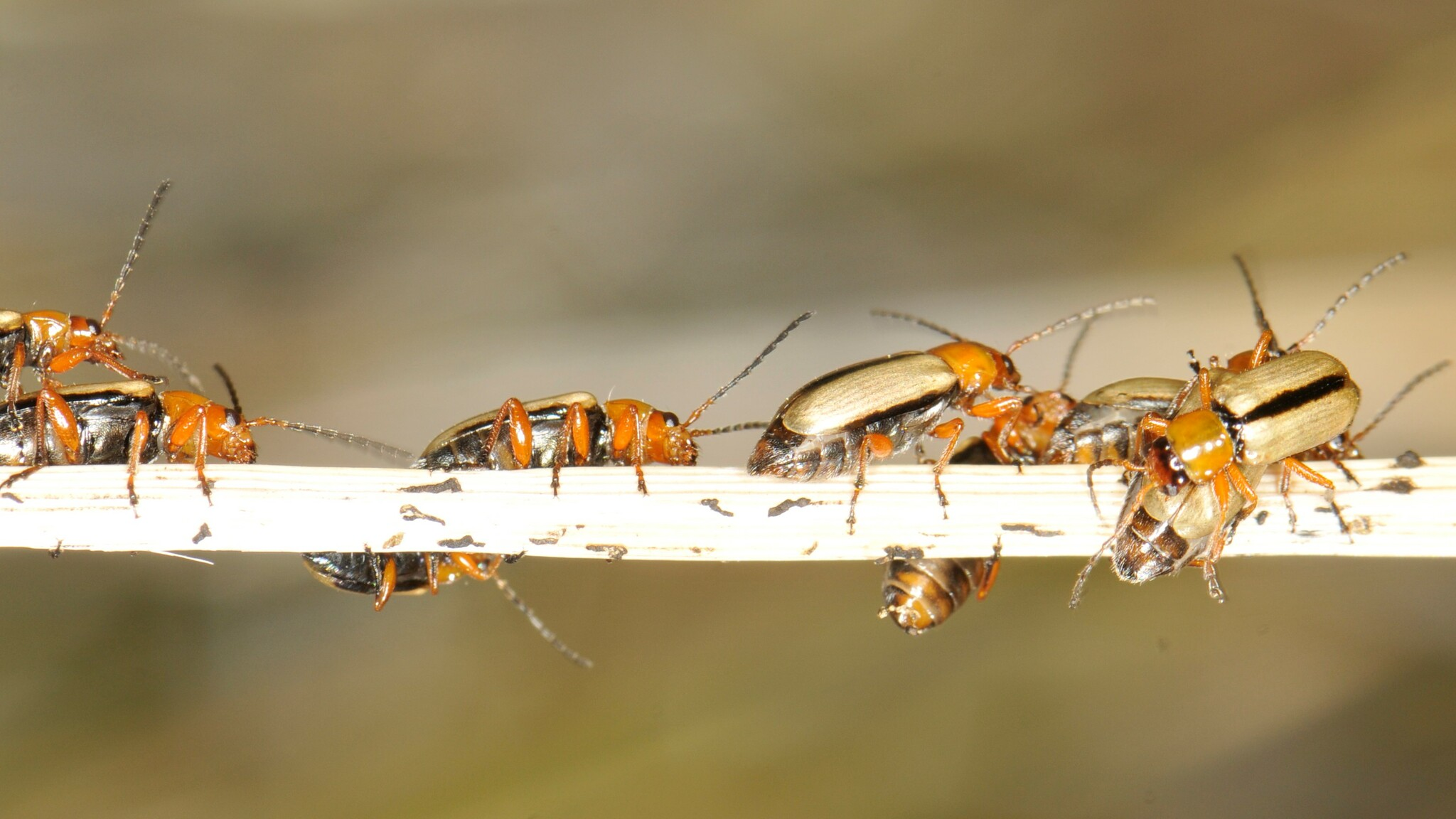

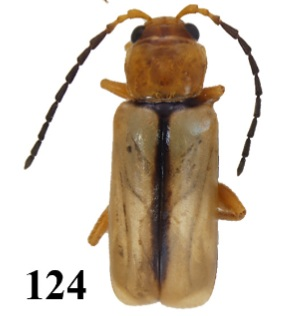

Scientific classification
- Kingdom: Animalia
- Phylum: Arthropoda
- Clade: Pancrustacea
- Class: Insecta
- Order: Coleoptera
- Suborder: Polyphaga
- Infraorder: Cucujiformia
- Family: Chrysomelidae
- Genus: Triarius
- Species: T. lividus

Binomial name
- Triarius lividus (J. L. LeConte, 1884)

Synonyms
- Phyllobrotica livida J. L. LeConte 1884

= Triarius lividus =

Species of beetle

Triarius lividus is a species of skeletonizing leaf beetle or flea beetle in the family Chrysomelidae. It is found in Central America and North America, from Arizona to western Texas.
