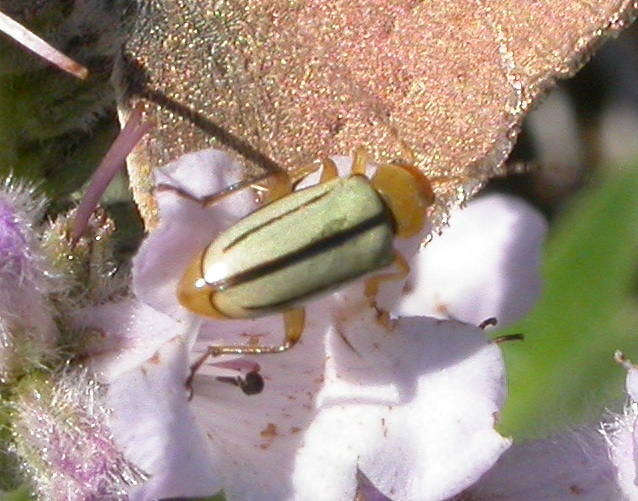

Scientific classification
- Kingdom: Animalia
- Phylum: Arthropoda
- Clade: Pancrustacea
- Class: Insecta
- Order: Coleoptera
- Suborder: Polyphaga
- Infraorder: Cucujiformia
- Family: Chrysomelidae
- Subfamily: Galerucinae
- Tribe: Luperini
- Genus: Triarius
- Species: T. melanolomatus

Binomial name
- Triarius melanolomatus (Blake, 1942)

= Triarius melanolomatus =

Species of beetle

Triarius melanolomatus is a species of skeletonizing leaf beetle in the family Chrysomelidae. It is found in North America.
