= Triariodes =

Scientific classification
- Kingdom: Animalia
- Phylum: Arthropoda
- Clade: Pancrustacea
- Class: Insecta
- Order: Coleoptera
- Suborder: Polyphaga
- Infraorder: Cucujiformia
- Family: Chrysomelidae
- Tribe: Luperini
- Subtribe: Luperina
- Genus: Triariodes; Clark & Anderson, 2019

Genus of leaf beetles

Triariodes is a genus of beetles belonging to the family Chrysomelidae.

== Species ==
- Triariodes admiratio Clark & Anderson, 2019
- Triariodes segonku Clark & Anderson, 2019
- Triariodes vittipennis (Horn, 1893)
