= Triarius nigroflavus =

Scientific classification
- Kingdom: Animalia
- Phylum: Arthropoda
- Clade: Pancrustacea
- Class: Insecta
- Order: Coleoptera
- Suborder: Polyphaga
- Infraorder: Cucujiformia
- Family: Chrysomelidae
- Subfamily: Galerucinae
- Tribe: Luperini
- Genus: Triarius
- Species: T. nigroflavus

Binomial name
- Triarius nigroflavus E. Riley, S. Clark & Gilbert, 2001

Species of beetle

Triarius nigroflavus is a species of skeletonizing leaf beetle in the family Chrysomelidae. It is found in North America.
