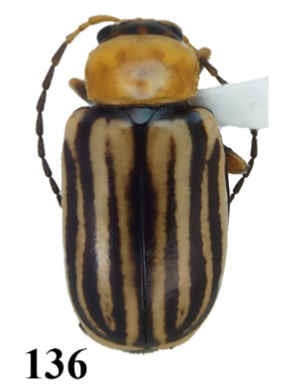

Scientific classification
- Kingdom: Animalia
- Phylum: Arthropoda
- Clade: Pancrustacea
- Class: Insecta
- Order: Coleoptera
- Suborder: Polyphaga
- Infraorder: Cucujiformia
- Family: Chrysomelidae
- Tribe: Luperini
- Subtribe: Luperina
- Genus: Triariodes
- Species: T. vittipennis

Binomial name
- Triariodes vittipennis (Horn, 1893)

Synonyms
- Malacosoma vittipenne Horn, 1893; Triarius vittipennis

= Triariodes vittipennis =

Species of beetle

Triariodes vittipennis is a species of skeletonizing leaf beetle in the family Chrysomelidae. It is found in North America, from New Mexico to central Texas.
