= Huon Valley =

Valley in Tasmania, Australia

- Apple Valley, Golden Valley, Huon
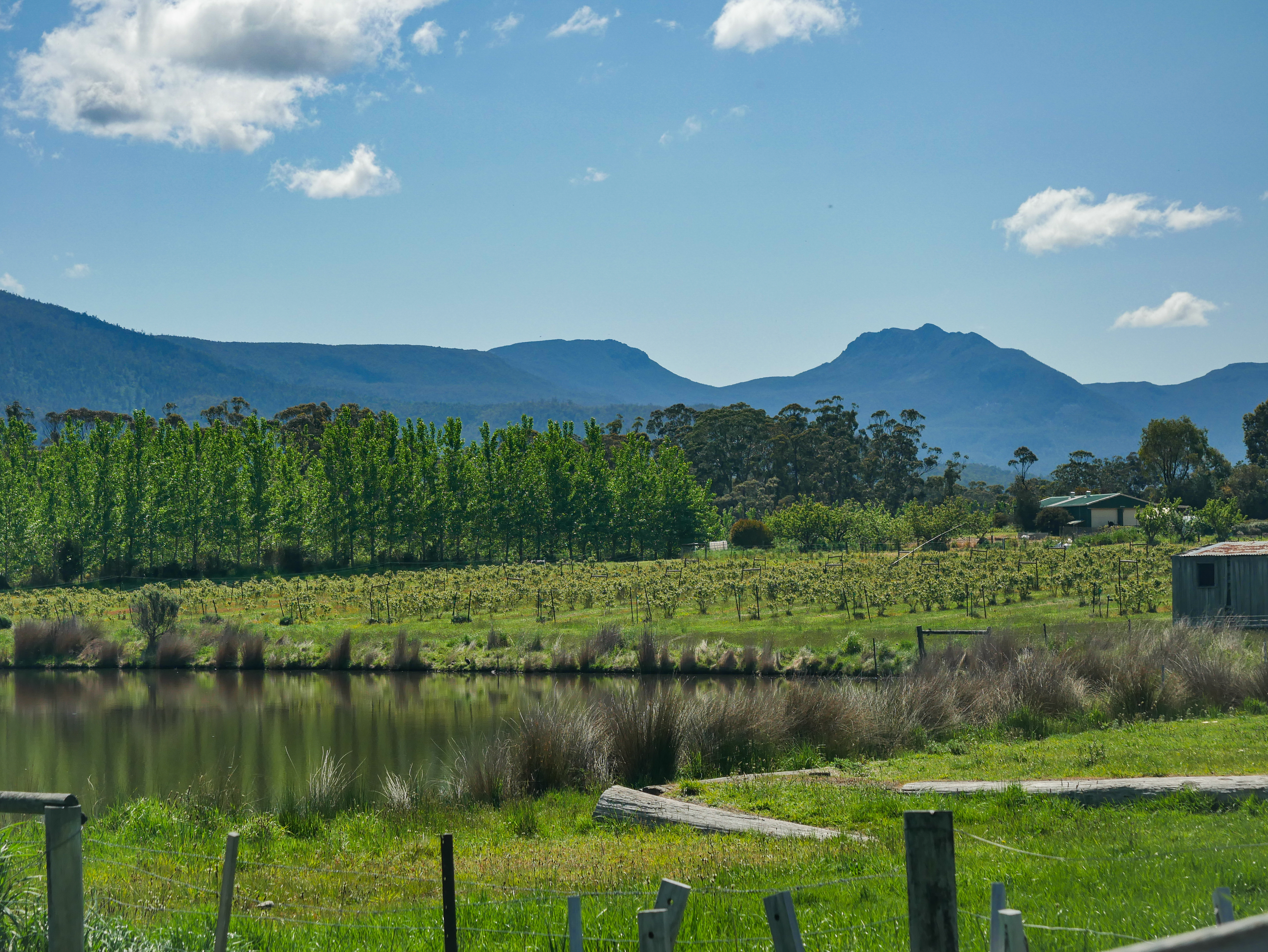
- Sleeping Beauty vista in the Huon Valley

- Location within Tasmania
- Area: 5,500 km^{2} (2,100 sq mi)

Geography
- Location: Tasmania, Australia
- Population centers: Huonville, Geeveston, Franklin, Cygnet, Southport
- Coordinates: 43.12°S 147.16°E
- Rivers: Huon River, Arve River
- Interactive map of Huon Valley

The Huon Valley, often shortened to the Huon, is a rural region and river valley in southern Tasmania, Australia. Centred on the lower reaches of the Huon River, its commercial hub is Huonville, with smaller settlements lining the river and its tributaries.

Historically renowned for its apple orchards, the valley's economy today also includes high-value cherry production, extensive salmon aquaculture centred on Port Huon, and a growing visitor economy. The valley's apple heritage is celebrated through events such as the Huon Valley Mid-Winter Festival and local “Apple Queen” traditions.

Administratively, the region is governed by the Huon Valley Council, which encompasses a population of 19,454 as of 2024.

== Geography ==
Defined by the Huon River, the Huon Valley has a catchment area spanning approximately 3,800 km^{2} (1,500 sq mi). The Arve River, one of the Huon River's main tributaries, also passes through the valley. Surrounding landscapes include rolling hills, temperate forests, and mountain ranges, with parts of the Southwest National Park and the Tasmanian Wilderness World Heritage Area forming the western boundary.

The commercial hub is Huonville, located 38 km (24 mi) by road south of the Hobart, typically a 30–40 minute drive from the central business district. Other notable towns include Geeveston, a traditional forestry centre and gateway to the Tahune Airwalk, and Cygnet, known for its arts and cultural community. Smaller settlements, including Franklin, Dover, and Southport, line the river and coastal inlets.

While the term Huon Valley usually refers to the natural valley of the Huon River, it also lends its name to the Huon Valley Council, a local government area that covers 5,507 km^{2} (2,126 sq mi). The council area extends south from Huonville to Southport, the southernmost permanent settlement in Australia, a distance of 59 km (37 mi) (about one hour's drive). This administrative boundary includes a number of hinterland districts and coastal areas beyond the river valley proper.

== History ==
=== Palawa history ===
The Huon Valley lies within the traditional lands of the Mellukerdee, who maintained kinship and language ties with the neighbouring Muwinina of the Hobart area, the Nuenonne of Bruny Island, and the Lyluequonny of Recherche Bay. These groups were interconnected through seasonal access, resource use, trade, and ceremony, and are sometimes collectively described in contemporary scholarship as forming part of the South-East nations. (Note: Earlier ethnographic works by George Augustus Robinson, Henry Ling Roth and N. J. B. Plomley referred to these groups as "tribes". In contemporary scholarship and community usage the preferred terms are "nations" or "peoples", which emphasise sovereignty and identity. The collective designation "South-East" is itself a modern scholarly construct rather than a term historically used by the peoples concerned.)

Before British colonisation the Huon Valley was covered in dense temperate rainforest, with the Huon River and its tributaries lined by towering hardwoods and stands of Huon pine (Lagarostrobos franklinii). The river flats and wetlands around areas such as the Egg Islands provided important resources for the Mellukerdee people. A traditional food of the Mellukerdee is laccocephalum mylittae, an underground fungus which forms a large subterranean body possessing a white, starchy interior and nutty flavour, which can be eaten raw or roasted. Known to colonists as "native bread", in 1922 a specimen weighing 28 lb (13 kg) was unearthed at Cradoc and later exhibited in Franklin.

=== British settlement ===
The valley was first settled by Europeans in the early 1820s. At that time the area was heavily forested, and settlers relied on river transport to obtain supplies and convey produce to Hobart. Early activity focused on timber splitting and the cultivation of potatoes, which were traded with Hobart in exchange for flour, sugar, salted meat and clothing. Small water-powered flour mills were later established, although wheat growing declined due to the moist climate and competition from mainland suppliers.

=== Early industries ===
Huon pine was first scientifically recorded in 1818 by botanist Allan Cunningham, who observed extensive stands of the species at Macquarie Harbour, while large logs were also reported drifting into the lower Huon River and D'Entrecasteaux Channel, indicating its abundance in the south of the island. The extensive stands of Huon pine along the Huon River were among the first used to cut the valuable timber for colonial shipbuilding and construction. Today, the species is featured on the Huon's riverbanks of the Tahune AirWalk near Geeveston.

Shipbuilding flourished in the 1860s and 1870s, supported by the demand for Huon pine, although the stands of the species were rapidly depleted. Blue gum and other hardwoods continued to sustain the timber trade, particularly in the manufacture of fruit cases. By the early 20th century the Huon was producing more than half of Tasmania's apple crop, with direct interstate shipments leaving from Port Huon and Cygnet. However, limited diversification left the Huon more economically vulnerable than other parts of Tasmania, with heavy reliance on the international export of timber and apples making it vulnerable to trade fluctuations arising from global events.

Alongside fruit growing, a range of secondary industries developed. These included berry pulping, fruit drying, wood-wool manufacture, and carbide production at Electrona. Hops were also cultivated at Ranelagh. Coal and mineral deposits were prospected in areas such as Catamaran and Strathblane, with varying degrees of commercial success. Scenic attractions including the Hartz Mountains and Hastings Caves contributed to the valley's reputation as a tourist destination from the early 20th century.

=== Apple Valley ===
Orchardist Thomas Judd planted the first apple trees in 1843, marking the beginning of the region's apple-growing industry. Other early orchardists included Silas Parsons and William Barnett at Franklin, and William Geeves at Geeveston, who in 1851 planted imported varieties such as Ribston Pippin, Blenheim Orange and Scarlet Pearmain. By the late 19th century extensive orchards lined much of the Huon River, and the district developed a reputation for apples of distinctive flavour and storability.

The Huon Valley later became known as Tasmania's "Apple Valley", and by the mid-20th century it was one of the most important apple-producing areas in Australia, with much of its produce exported internationally. While Tasmanian apple production has since declined, it remains a culturally significant industry, along with contemporary cherry, berry, and stone fruit farming.

== Economy ==
The Huon Valley has a diverse economy, with major industries including agriculture, aquaculture, forestry, and tourism. Agriculture, particularly apple growing, remains central to the valley's identity, with 83% of Tasmanian apples originating from the area.

The valley is also home to Tasmania's largest salmon farming operations, with Huon Aquaculture and Tassal having significant facilities in the region.

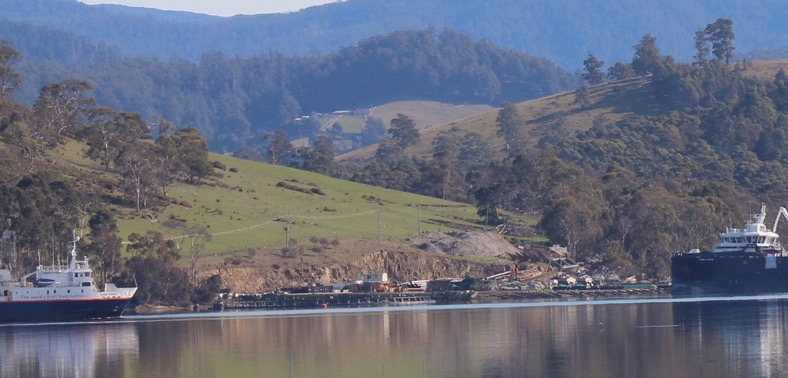
Large Salmon Farming Vessels at Whale Point Processing Facility

Salmon farming is a major economic contributor, though it has also raised environmental concerns in recent years.

The tourism industry is growing, with visitors attracted to the natural beauty of the region, the Tahune Airwalk, and the Huon River. Eco-tourism activities such as hiking, river cruises, and wildlife tours are becoming increasingly popular. Approximately 25% of Tasmania's tourists visit the Huon Valley.

In 2020, the gross regional product of the Huon Valley was estimated at $0.71 billion, with the largest employment sectors being agriculture, forestry, aquaculture, healthcare, and retail.

== Etymology ==
The Huon Valley, along with its local government authority, several towns, the Huon River, and the Huon pine, were named after Jean-Michel Huon de Kermadec, a French Navy officer and explorer who visited Tasmania as part of Bruni d'Entrecasteaux's expedition in the 1790s.

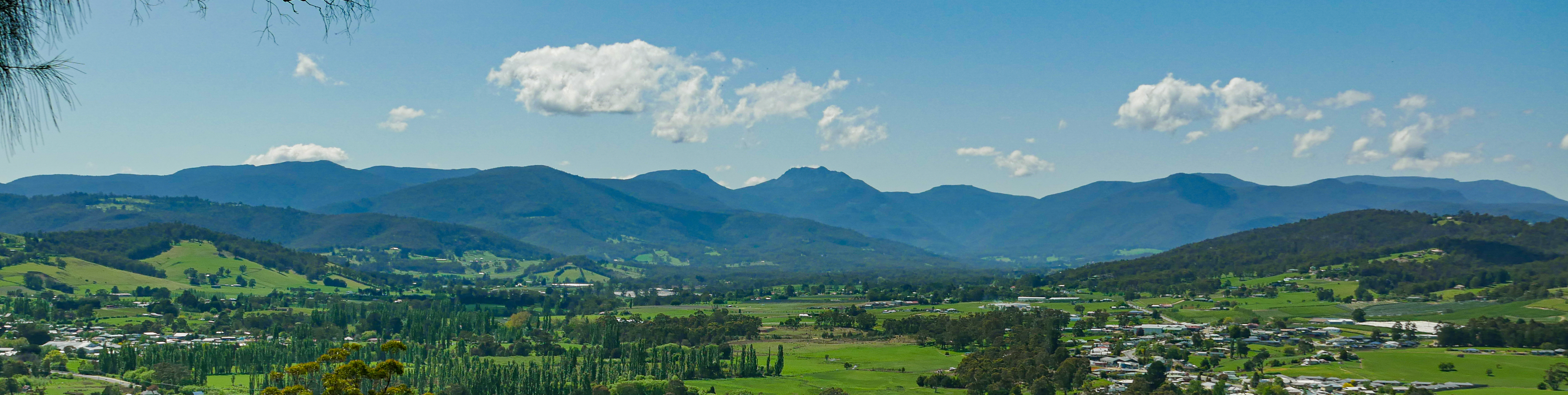
Huon Valley panorama from Scenic Hill

== Governance ==
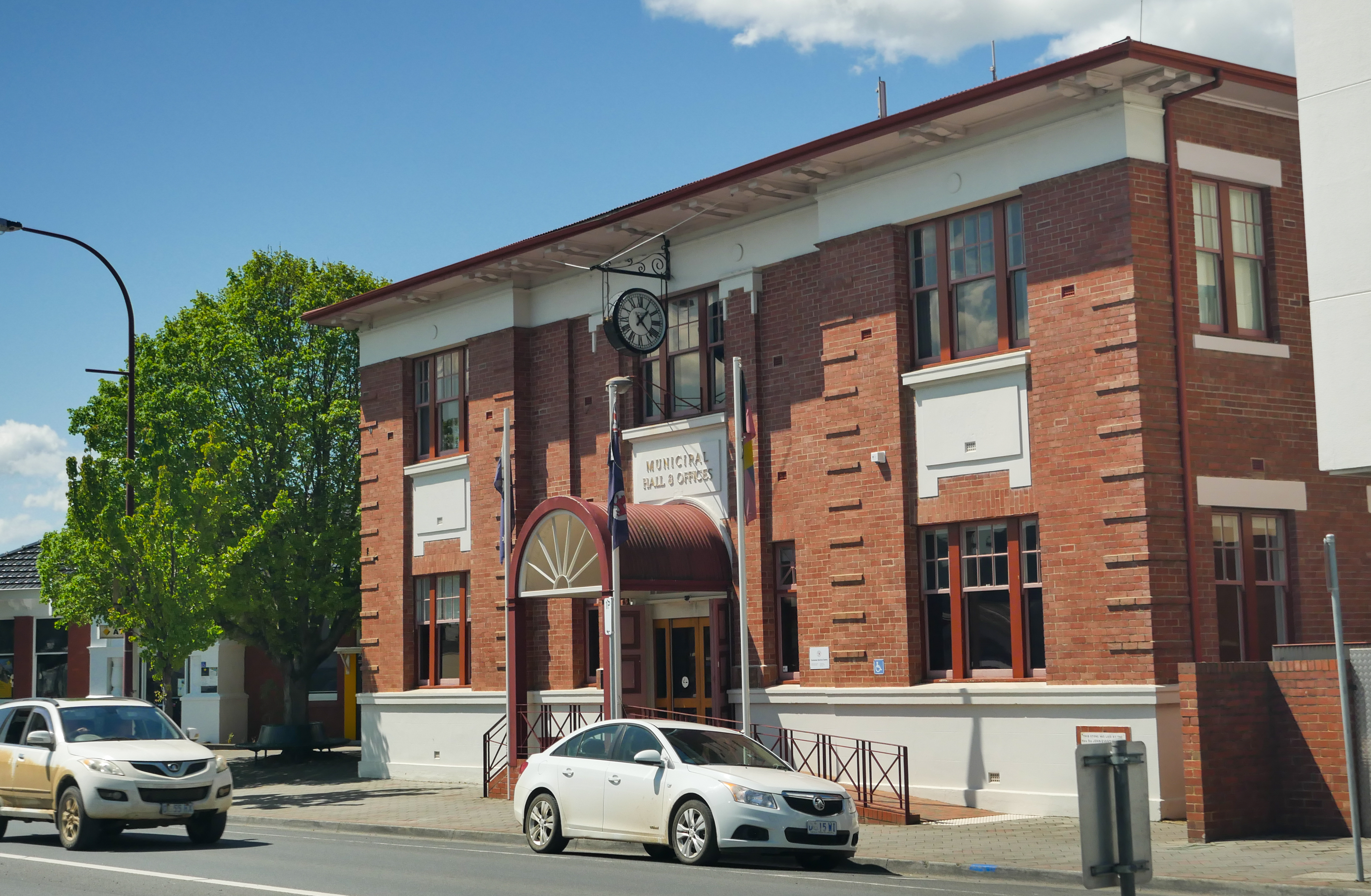
Huonville Municipal Hall and Offices

The Huon Valley is governed by the Huon Valley Council, a local government area formed in 1993 through the merger of the municipalities of Port Cygnet, Esperance, and Huon. Spanning an area of 5,507 km^{2} (2,126 sq mi), the council administers the greater region, including overseeing local services and planning.

The valley falls within the Commonwealth Division of Franklin and the Tasmanian House of Assembly State Division of Franklin.

== Media ==
The Huon Valley is served by several local media outlets. Tasmanian Times is an independent online platform for news, stories and digital media of all categories about the island of Tasmania. The Huon News is a weekly newspaper providing news and events coverage, while Cygnet & Channel Classifieds is a small newsletter serving local communities. The valley is also home to radio stations such as Pulse FM Kingborough and Huon and Huon & Kingston FM, a community radio station based in Geeveston. Historically, the region was served by the Huon Times, which ceased publication in 1942.

== See also ==
- Tasmanian apples
- List of valleys of Australia § Tasmania
