= Waterloo, Tasmania =

Waterloo Tasmania
- Coordinates: 43°12′32″S 146°58′01″E
- Population: 104 (SAL 2021)
- Postcode(s): 7109
- Location: 28 km (17 mi) SW of Huonville
- LGA(s): Huon Valley
- Region: South-east
- State electorate(s): Franklin
- Federal division(s): Franklin
Localities around Waterloo:
Geeveston	Cairns Bay	Huon River
Geeveston	Waterloo	Surges Bay
Geeveston	Geeveston, Surges Bay	Surges Bay

Waterloo is a rural locality in the local government area (LGA) of Huon Valley in the South-east LGA region of Tasmania. The locality is about 28 kilometres (17 mi) south-west of the town of Huonville.

== History ==
Waterloo was gazetted as a locality in 1965.

The 2016 census recorded a population of 92 for the state suburb of Waterloo. At the 2021 census, the population had increased to 104.

== Geography ==
The waters of the Huon River estuary form the north-eastern boundary.

== Road infrastructure ==
Route A6 (Huon Highway) runs through from north-west to north-east.
