= Strathblane, Tasmania =

Strathblane Tasmania
- Coordinates: 43°20′24″S 146°58′34″E
- Population: 125 (2016 census)
- Postcode(s): 7109
- Location: 48 km (30 mi) S of Huonville
- LGA(s): Huon Valley
- Region: South-east
- State electorate(s): Franklin
- Federal division(s): Franklin
Localities around Strathblane:
Raminea	Port Esperance, Raminea	D'Entrecasteaux Channel
Southwest	Strathblane	D'Entrecasteaux Channel
Hastings	Southport, Hastings	D'Entrecasteaux Channel

Strathblane is a rural locality in the local government area (LGA) of Huon Valley in the South-east LGA region of Tasmania. The locality is about 48 kilometres (30 mi) south of the town of Huonville. The 2016 census recorded a population of 125 for the state suburb of Strathblane.

== History ==
Strathblane was gazetted as a locality in 1966.

== Geography ==
The waters of the D'Entrecasteaux Channel form the eastern boundary, and Port Espérance part of the northern.

== Road infrastructure ==
Route A6 (Huon Highway) runs through from north to south.
