= Cairns Bay, Tasmania =

Cairns Bay
- Town
- Coordinates: 43°11′14″S 146°57′40″E
- Country: Australia
- State: Tasmania
- Region: South-east
- LGA: Huon Valley
- Location: 25 km (16 mi) SW of Huonville

Government
  - State electorate: Franklin
  - Federal division: Franklin

Population
  - Total: 76 (2016 census)
- Postcode: 7116
Localities around Cairns Bay
Geeveston	Port Huon	Port Huon
Geeveston	Cairns Bay	Huon River
Geeveston	Waterloo	Waterloo

Cairns Bay is a rural locality in the local government area (LGA) of Huon Valley in the South-east LGA region of Tasmania. The locality is about 25 kilometres (16 mi) south-west of the town of Huonville. The 2016 census recorded a population of 76 for the state suburb of Cairns Bay.

== History ==
Cairns Bay was gazetted as a locality in 1965.

== Geography ==
The waters of the Huon River estuary form the eastern boundary.

== Road infrastructure ==
Route C634 (Scotts Road) runs through from north-west to south.
