= Raminea, Tasmania =

Raminea Tasmania
- Coordinates: 43°19′31″S 146°57′56″E
- Population: 47 (2016 census)
- Postcode(s): 7109
- Location: 47 km (29 mi) S of Huonville
- LGA(s): Huon Valley
- Region: South-east
- State electorate(s): Franklin
- Federal division(s): Franklin
Localities around Raminea:
Southwest	Dover	Dover
Southwest	Raminea	Dover
Southwest	Strathblane	Strathblane

Raminea is a rural locality in the local government area (LGA) of Huon Valley in the South-east LGA region of Tasmania. The locality is about 47 kilometres (29 mi) south of the town of Huonville. The 2016 census recorded a population of 47 for the state suburb of Raminea.

== History ==
Raminea was gazetted as a locality in 1966. The name is believed to be an Aboriginal word for what is now called “Port Espérance”, the bay at the mouth of the Espérance River.

== Geography ==
Almost all of the boundaries are ridgelines. The Espérance River flows through from north-west to south-east.

== Road infrastructure ==
Route A6 (Huon Highway) passes through the south-east corner of the locality.
