= Hastings, Tasmania =

Hastings
- Town
- Coordinates: 43°25′24″S 146°56′17″E
- Country: Australia
- State: Tasmania
- Region: South-east
- LGA: Huon Valley
- Location: 62 km (39 mi) SW of Huonville

Government
  - State electorate: Franklin
  - Federal division: Franklin

Population
  - Total: 44 (2016 census)
- Postcode: 7109
Localities around Hastings
Southwest	Strathblane	Southport, Strathblane
Southwest	Hastings	Southport
Lune River	Lune River	Southport

Hastings is a rural locality in the local government area of Huon Valley in the South-east region of Tasmania. It is located about 62 kilometres (39 mi) south-west of the town of Huonville. The 2016 census recorded a population of 44 for the state suburb of Hastings.

== History ==
Hastings was gazetted as a locality in 1966.

== Geography ==
The southern boundary is formed by Mesa Creek, Lune River, and the shores of Hastings Bay. Hastings Caves State Reserve is in the north-west of the locality.

=== Climate ===
Climate data for Hastings Chalet (35 m AMSL; BOM 1945-present)
Month	Jan	Feb	Mar	Apr	May	Jun	Jul	Aug	Sep	Oct	Nov	Dec	Year
Record high °C (°F)	38.7 (101.7)	38.9 (102.0)	35.1 (95.2)	29.6 (85.3)	23.0 (73.4)	20.3 (68.5)	19.6 (67.3)	22.0 (71.6)	30.2 (86.4)	31.1 (88.0)	35.0 (95.0)	35.7 (96.3)	38.9 (102.0)
Mean daily maximum °C (°F)	20.4 (68.7)	20.5 (68.9)	19.0 (66.2)	16.7 (62.1)	13.7 (56.7)	11.8 (53.2)	11.2 (52.2)	12.4 (54.3)	13.8 (56.8)	15.9 (60.6)	17.3 (63.1)	18.8 (65.8)	16.0 (60.8)
Mean daily minimum °C (°F)	9.1 (48.4)	9.2 (48.6)	8.4 (47.1)	7.1 (44.8)	5.1 (41.2)	3.4 (38.1)	2.6 (36.7)	3.2 (37.8)	4.4 (39.9)	5.7 (42.3)	7.0 (44.6)	8.4 (47.1)	6.1 (43.0)
Record low °C (°F)	1.0 (33.8)	1.0 (33.8)	0.4 (32.7)	−0.7 (30.7)	−2.9 (26.8)	−5 (23)	−5 (23)	−5 (23)	−2.2 (28.0)	−2.2 (28.0)	−0.1 (31.8)	1.1 (34.0)	−5 (23)
Average rainfall mm (inches)	73.1 (2.88)	69.2 (2.72)	86.2 (3.39)	107.4 (4.23)	125.8 (4.95)	132.4 (5.21)	147.5 (5.81)	154.6 (6.09)	134.1 (5.28)	134.4 (5.29)	108.6 (4.28)	102.6 (4.04)	1,380.2 (54.34)
Average rainy days (≥ 0.2 mm)	12.8	11.9	14.4	16.7	18.6	18.5	20.9	21.1	19.9	19.6	17.0	15.7	207.1

== Road infrastructure ==
The C635 route (Hastings Caves Road) enters from the east and runs generally west and north-west until it reaches the Hastings Caves State Reserve, where it ends.
