= Port Huon, Tasmania =

Port Huon Tasmania
- Coordinates: 43°09′18″S 146°56′48″E
- Population: 428 (2016 census)
- Postcode(s): 7116
- Location: 22 km (14 mi) SW of Huonville
- LGA(s): Huon Valley
- Region: South-east
- State electorate(s): Franklin
- Federal division(s): Franklin
Localities around Port Huon:
Geeveston	Geeveston, Castle Forbes Bay	Huon River
Geeveston	Port Huon	Huon River
Geeveston	Cairns Bay, Geeveston	Cairns Bay

Port Huon is a rural locality in the local government area (LGA) of Huon Valley in the South-east LGA region of Tasmania. The locality is about 22 kilometres (14 mi) south-west of the town of Huonville. The 2016 census recorded a population of 428 for the state suburb of Port Huon.

== History ==
Port Huon was gazetted as a locality in 1965.

== Geography ==
The waters of the Huon River estuary form the eastern boundary.

== Road infrastructure ==
Route A6 (Huon Highway) runs through from north-east to south-west.
