= Glen Huon =

- Town
- Coordinates: 43°01′50″S 146°57′37″E
- Country: Australia
- State: Tasmania
- Region: South-east
- LGA: Huon Valley
- Location: 10 km (6.2 mi) W of Huonville

Government
  - State electorate: Franklin
  - Federal division: Franklin

Population
  - Total: 742 (SAL 2021)
- Postcode: 7109
Localities around Glen Huon
Judbury	Ranelagh, Judbury	Ranelagh
Judbury	Glen Huon	Franklin, Huonville
Geeveston	Franklin, Geeveston	Franklin

Glen Huon is a rural residential locality in the local government area of Huon Valley in the South-east region of Tasmania. It is located about 10 kilometres (6 mi) west of the town of Huonville. The 2021 census recorded a population of 742 for the locality of Glen Huon.

== History ==
Glen Huon was gazetted as a locality in 1965. Upper Huon Post Office opened on 1 August 1907. It was renamed Wybalerma in 1910 and Glen Huon in 1911.

== Geography ==
The Huon River forms the northern boundary.

== Road infrastructure ==
The C619 route (Glen Huon Road) enters from the north-west and runs along the Huon River to the north-east, where it exits.

== Notable people ==
- John Haeny (1941–2023) – American music producer and sound designer known for his work with The Doors and Jim Morrison, as well as his sound design for Twin Peaks. From 2003 until his death in 2023 Haeny operated Sunny Hills Studios on his 10-acre (4.0 ha) property on Sunny Hills Road, just outside Glen Huon.
