= Huon Highway =

Highway in Tasmania, Australia

Huon Highway Tasmania
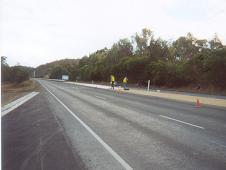
- The Huon Highway at Sandfly

General information
- Type: Highway
- Length: 116 km (72 mi)
- Route number(s): A6; Kingston to Southport
- Former route number: State Route 1

Major junctions
- North end: Southern Outlet Kingston, Tasmania
- Sandfly Road; Channel Highway
- South end: Kingfish Beach Road; Lady Bay Road; Southport, Tasmania

Location(s)
- Major settlements: Sandfly, Grove, Huonville, Franklin, Port Huon, Geeveston, Dover

Highway system
- Highways in Australia; National Highway • Freeways in Australia; Highways in Tasmania

The Huon Highway is a major highway in southern Tasmania, Australia, forming part of route A6. It runs approximately 116 kilometres (72 mi) from Kingston to Southport, making it the southernmost sealed highway in Australia. The route connects Hobart with the Huon Valley, serving as the primary road corridor through several towns including Huonville, Franklin, Geeveston, and Dover.

== Route ==
The highway begins at the junction with the Southern Outlet at Kingston and travels southwest through Sandfly, Grove, and Huonville. It continues along the eastern side of the Huon River through Franklin and Port Huon, passes through Geeveston and Dover, and terminates near Southport at Lady Bay Road.

Traffic is heaviest between Kingston and Huonville, with lower volumes in more remote southern sections.

== History and alignment changes ==
The original Huon Highway alignment followed what is now designated as B64 (Huon Road), a narrow and winding route around Mount Wellington.

Major upgrades began in the 1960s, including the construction of the Southern Outlet in 1968 to improve access between Hobart and Kingston. Subsequent realignments bypassed winding sections near Grove, Port Huon, and Dover.

== Recent upgrades ==
=== Kingston Bypass ===
The Kingston Bypass opened in 2011 to divert highway traffic around Kingston's central business district. The 2.8 km dual carriageway was jointly funded by the state and federal governments at a cost of $41 million.

It includes grade-separated interchanges, noise barriers, and shared pedestrian and cycling infrastructure. The bypass connects the Southern Outlet to the Huon Highway at Huntingfield.

=== Summerleas Road intersection ===
In 2016, a grade-separated interchange was constructed where the Huon Highway intersects with Summerleas Road. This followed years of crash data showing 48 collisions from 2005 to 2015.

The $21.2 million project added new roundabouts, safety barriers, lighting, and cycling infrastructure. Work was completed in 2018.

=== Huon Link Road ===
Opened in March 2025, the Huon Link Road is a bypass around central Huonville designed to reduce congestion on Main Street. It connects Orchard Avenue and the Huon Highway to Flood Road, providing a more direct route for traffic to and from Cygnet.

Construction began in 2023, with flood mitigation works and bridge upgrades included in the $29 million joint state-federal funding package. Minor landscaping and road works continued into mid-2025.

== Future planning ==
As of 2025, the Tasmanian Government is continuing to plan safety and capacity improvements along the Huon Highway corridor, including:

- Intersection upgrades at Ranelagh and Franklin
- Additional overtaking lanes between Huonville and Dover
- Drainage and pavement upgrades in flood-prone areas
- Improved integration with public transport services

These priorities align with the Department of State Growth’s broader Southern Transport Strategy.

== Major intersections ==
- A6 Southern Outlet (Kingston)
- B68 Channel Highway
- B64 Sandfly Road (to Longley and Fern Tree)
- C632 Arve Road (to Tahune Airwalk)
- C635 Esperance Coast Road (via Dover)

== See also ==
- Highways in Australia
- List of highways in Tasmania
