= Egg Islands =

Islands in Huon River, South Tasmania

Coordinates: 43°04′43″S 147°01′31″E

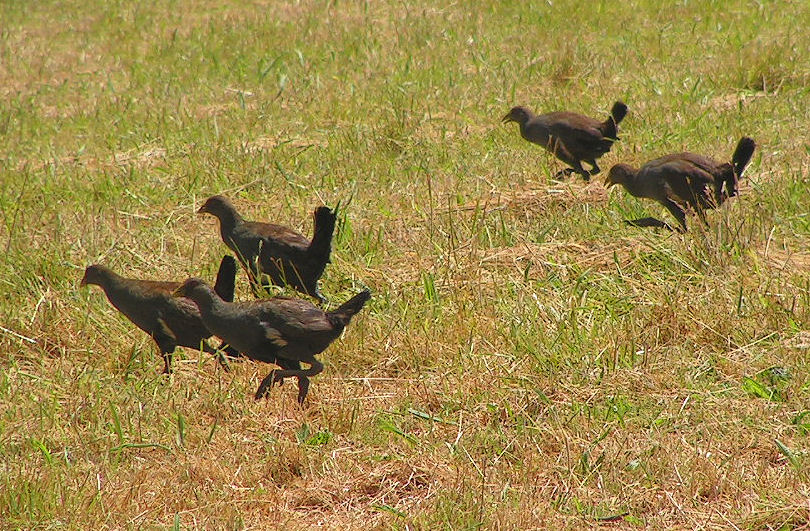
The Egg Islands are an important site for Tasmanian nativehens

The Egg Islands are a small group of low-lying estuarine islands in the tidal lower reaches of the Huon River of south-east Tasmania, Australia. They face the town of Franklin which lies on the western bank of the river.

== Birds ==
The islands have been identified as a 317 ha Important Bird Area because they support a small population of the Australasian bittern, one of the last refuges for this endangered species in the state. Swift parrots occasionally visit the islands which are also home to large numbers of the endemic Tasmanian nativehens and yellow wattlebirds.
