= Franklin, Tasmania =

Franklin
- Town
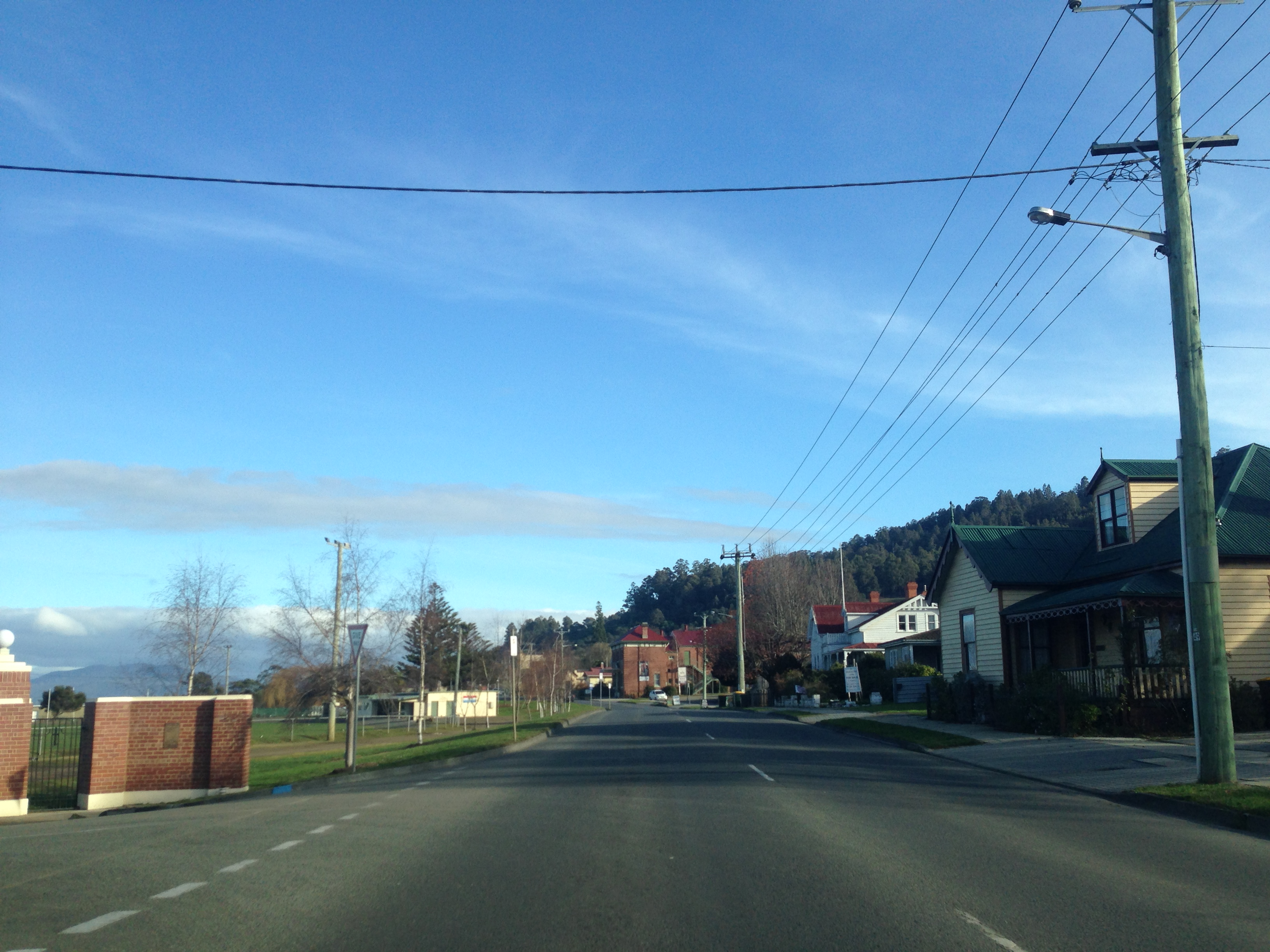
- View down the main street, Franklin

- Coordinates: 43°05′S 147°01′E
- Country: Australia
- State: Tasmania
- LGA: Huon Valley Council
- Location: 7.5 km (4.7 mi) from Huonville; 14.6 km (9.1 mi) from Geeveston; 23.3 km (14.5 mi) from Cygnet; 45.1 km (28.0 mi) from Hobart
- Established: 1836 (first land grant)

Government
  - State electorate: Franklin
  - Federal division: Franklin
- Elevation: 13 m (43 ft)

Population
  - Total: 444 (2021 census)
- Time zone: UTC+10 (AEST)
  - Summer (DST): UTC+11 (AEDT)
- Postcode: 7113
- Gazetted: 1866 (town proclaimed)

Franklin is a historic riverside town in the Huon Valley, Tasmania. Located on the western bank of the Huon River about 45 km (28 mi) south-west of Hobart, the Huon Highway links Franklin with Tasmania’s southernmost communities. It lies within the jurisdiction of the Huon Valley Council local government area.

With informal settlement commencing in 1822, Franklin is considered the oldest township in the Huon Valley. The valley’s early prosperity rested on river transport that carried timber and apples to Hobart and, later, to Port Huon. Franklin remained the district’s principal settlement until stalled foreshore reclamation works and the rise of neighbouring Huonville shifted commerce upstream. Today the town maintains its boat building heritage with through the Wooden Boat Centre, a school and museum dedicated to traditional wooden-boat construction, and agricultural traditions through cideries and roadside stalls selling locally grown apples and pears.

At the 2021 census, the locality of Franklin recorded a population of 444, while the surrounding rural district supports roughly 1,000 residents. Census data show a markedly older demographic: the median age is 64 years and women comprise 55 % of the population, underlining Franklin’s appeal as a compact, retirement-oriented community.

== History ==
=== Palawa history ===
Franklin is located on the traditional lands of the Mellukerdee people, who utilised the coastal zone and hinterland throughout the year. The route now known as Walpole Lane was traditionally used to travel between the foreshore and surrounding hills.

=== British settlement ===
The earliest known European inhabitant was an absconding convict called "Martin", reported to have arrived in 1822. British colonists first reached what is now Franklin after a pack-horse track was opened through the Huon Valley in 1829, while its first sanctioned landholder was John Price, who bought an acreage in 1836. Lady Jane Franklin purchased adjoining land two years later and sought to foster a class of small, self-reliant farmers by renting modest lots to distressed settlers.

Lady Jane is widely credited with establishing "the settlement" in 1838, and the locality was formally renamed Franklin in her honour in 1850. Her husband, Sir John Franklin, then Lieutenant-Governor of Van Diemen’s Land, actively championed its early development.

By mid-century the township already supported a church, a school and a postal service. When Franklin was proclaimed a town in 1866 its population eclipsed neighbouring settlements, and residents could sample Spooners Brewery ale at the Lady Franklin Hotel or attend lectures at the Mechanics’ Institute, opened in 1860.

A mixed economy of forestry, agriculture and small-scale horticulture underpinned the town’s growth, while its position on the Huon River brought significant prosperity during the late nineteenth and early twentieth centuries. The presence of a Magistrate’s Court and Police Station secured Franklin’s role as the Huon’s administrative hub, and industries such as timber milling, boatbuilding, apple and berry production supported a lively retail sector.

Postal services charted the town’s changing identity: the Huon Post Office opened on 31 August 1848, became Franklin-Huon in 1853 and finally Franklin in 1878.

=== Decline and resurgence ===
Settlement initially clustered on the river’s western bank beside what is now the Huon Highway. Limited foreshore reclamation in the 1920s enabled some growth to the east, but most buildings followed the river in a narrow ribbon to retain water access. Construction of the highway reinforced this linear pattern, and modern planning schemes now direct fresh development back to the landward side of the road. Combined with improved roads and the rise of nearby Huonville, when foreshore reclamation works stalled, Franklin’s expansion slowed markedly. Better road links and the collapse of the Tasmanian apple and soft-fruit markets gradually eroded Franklin’s prosperity. Community resolve endured, however, evident in projects such as the restoration of the Palais Theatre, revegetation of Prices Creek and reconstruction of the town wharf.

The reclaimed foreshore remains Franklin’s social heart, accommodating rowing regattas, cricket, riverside walks and informal camping.

In 1992 the former Department of Environment and Planning, with National Trust of Australia (Tasmania) support, declared Franklin a Historic Town. Several sites are also listed on the (now-closed) Register of the National Estate.

Tourism (particularly the Wooden Boat Centre’s traditional boat-building school) has recently reinvigorated the township.

== Economy ==
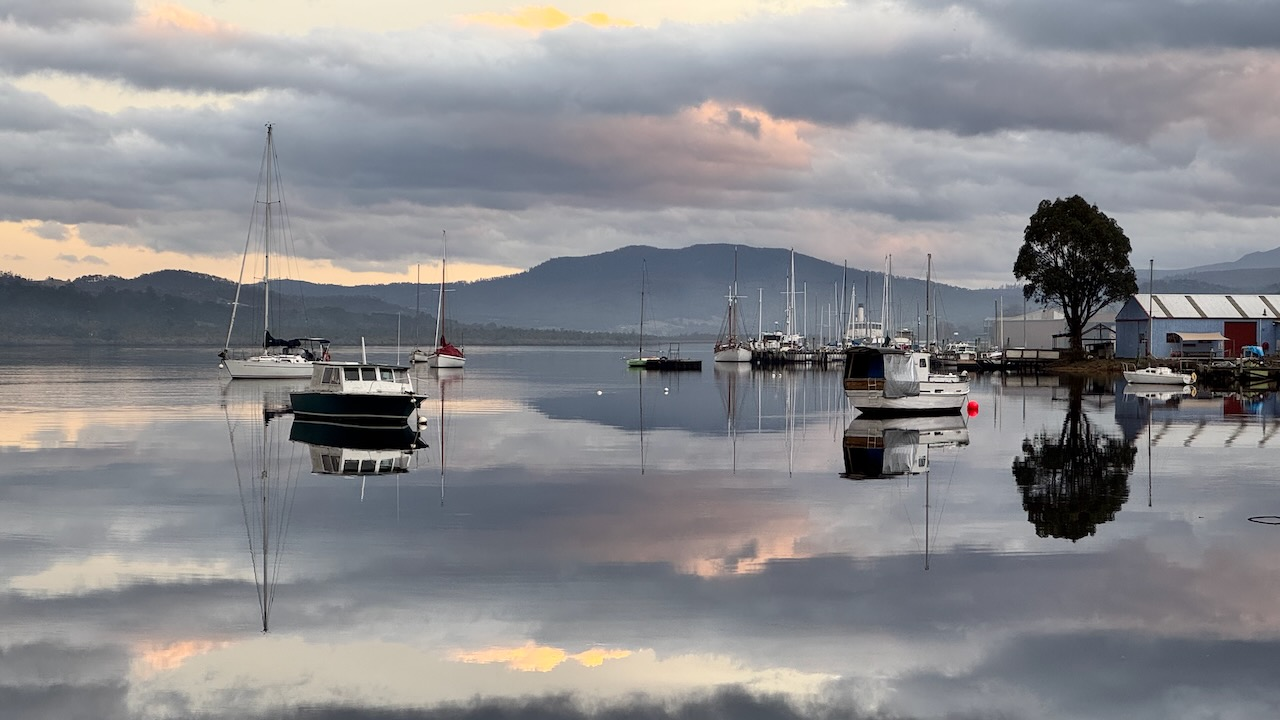
Boats on the Huon River at Franklin

Franklin's economy is centred on agriculture, including orchards, vineyards, and small-scale farms. The town supports a range of commercial ventures such as cafés, restaurants, galleries, pubs, the post office, Franklin Evaporators, a takeaway shop, a service station, and a regional newspaper and printery.

The Wooden Boat Centre is a focal point for Franklin's wooden boatbuilding tradition, offering courses and workshops.

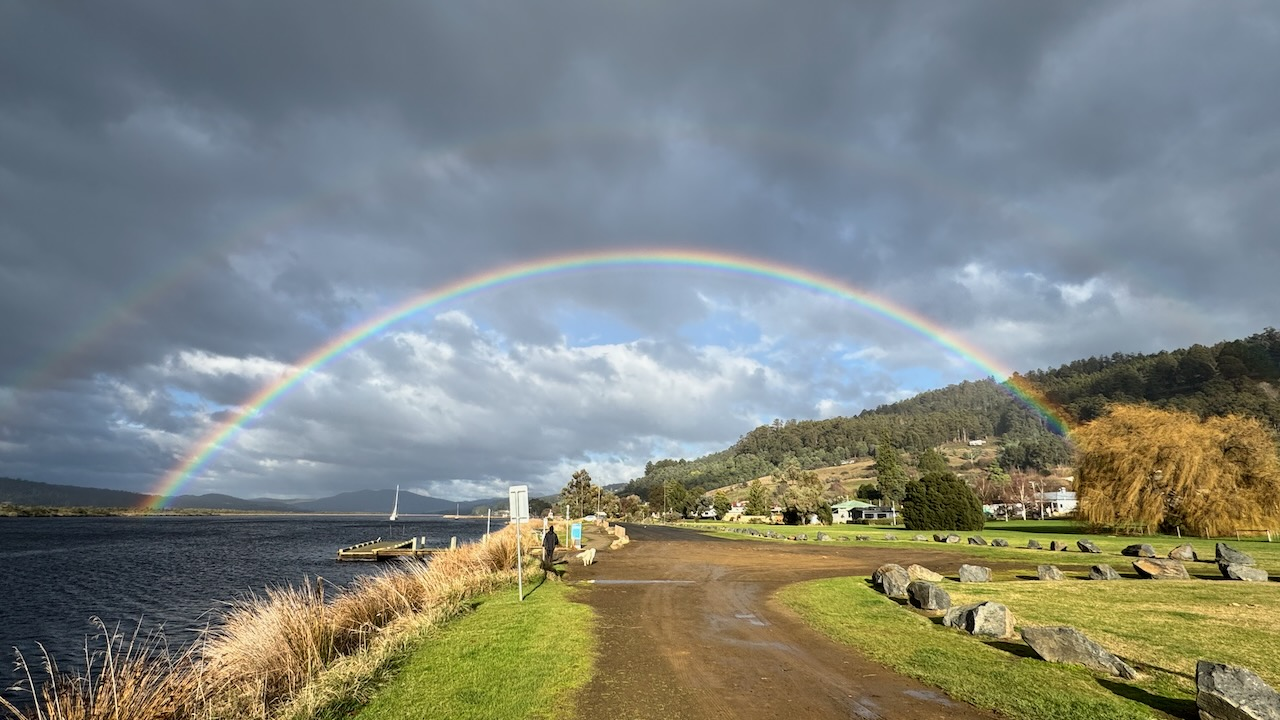
Double rainbow at Franklin

Tourism remains a significant industry, with attractions including river cruises, historic buildings, artisanal food producers, and the natural environment of the Huon River.

== Community and culture ==
Franklin hosts a number of annual events, including regattas on the Huon River and community markets showcasing local produce and crafts. The Palais Theatre functions as a community arts venue, hosting concerts, film screenings, and performances.

Franklin Primary School educates children from Kindergarten to Year 6, serving families from Franklin and surrounding areas.

== Heritage and notable buildings ==
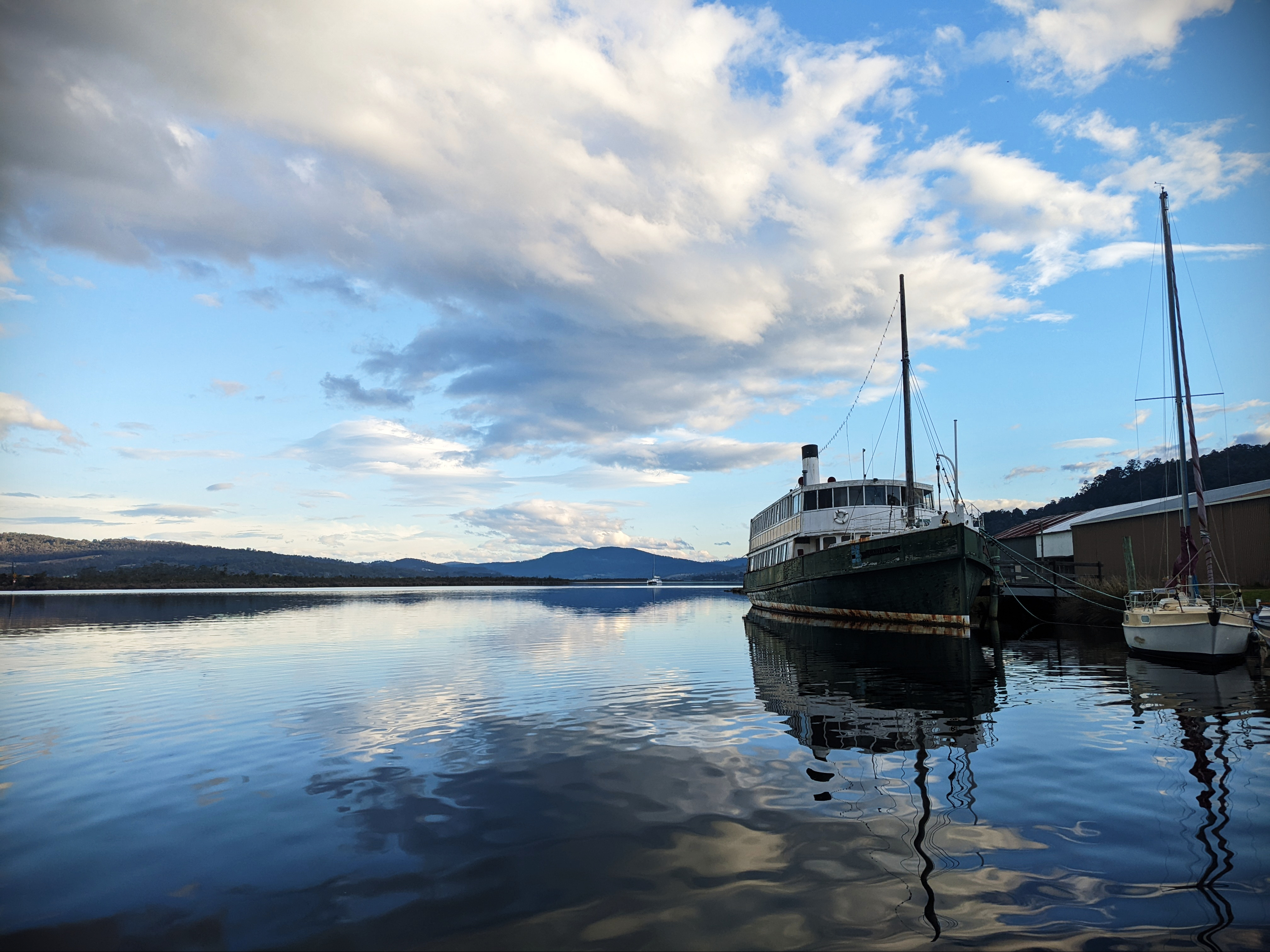
MV Cartela moored at the Wooden Boat Centre

Significant heritage-listed sites in Franklin include:

- The former Franklin Court House, now operating as a café
- The restored Palais Theatre (circa 1911, formerly the town hall)
- The Wooden Boat Centre, celebrating Tasmania's maritime craftsmanship
- The restored Commercial Bank of Australia (built 1920 decommissioned in 1976)
- The historic steamship MV Cartela, long moored at the Wooden Boat Centre, is one of Tasmania's oldest surviving vessels. In February 2025, the Cartela partially sank at its moorings, prompting ongoing efforts to develop a recovery and restoration plan.

== Transport ==
Franklin is accessible via the Huon Highway (A6), which links the town to Hobart and other centres in the Huon Valley. Regular bus services connect Franklin with Hobart and Geeveston, operated by Tassielink Transit.

== Governance ==
Franklin falls within the jurisdiction of the Huon Valley Council local government area. At the state level, it is part of the electoral division of Franklin, and federally, it also belongs to the Division of Franklin.

== Climate ==
Franklin has a cool oceanic climate (Köppen: Cfb), characterised by mild summers, cool, wet winters and consistent rainfall throughout the year. The nearest weather station at Grove (BoM site 094029) records average daily maxima from 21.6 °C (70.9 °F) in January to 11.4 °C (52.5 °F) in July, and average daily minima from 10.0 °C (50.0 °F) in February to 2.6 °C (36.7 °F) in July.

Mean annual precipitation is approximately 875 millimetres (34.4 in), spread across 161 days, with peak rainfall occurring during winter and early spring. The region experiences moderate humidity, cool morning dew points in winter, and relatively low sunshine hours compared to northern Tasmania. Recorded temperature extremes at Grove have ranged from 37.2 °C (99.0 °F) on 31 January 1968 to −4.9 °C (23.2 °F) on 30 July 1997.

Climate data for Grove (BoM site 094029, 43°02′S 147°01′E, 62 m AMSL)
| Month | Jan | Feb | Mar | Apr | May | Jun | Jul | Aug | Sep | Oct | Nov | Dec | Year |
|---|---|---|---|---|---|---|---|---|---|---|---|---|---|
| Record high °C | 37.2 | — | — | — | — | — | — | — | — | — | — | — | 37.2 |
| Mean daily maximum °C | 21.6 | 21.3 | 19.4 | 16.0 | 13.0 | 11.6 | 11.4 | 12.2 | 14.0 | 16.2 | 18.2 | 20.2 | 16.3 |
| Mean daily minimum °C | 10.1 | 10.0 | 8.8 | 6.4 | 4.5 | 3.1 | 2.6 | 3.1 | 4.2 | 5.7 | 7.4 | 8.9 | 6.2 |
| Record low °C | — | — | — | — | — | — | −4.9 | — | — | — | — | — | −4.9 |
| Average precipitation mm | 47.5 | 40.4 | 53.1 | 61.3 | 80.2 | 87.6 | 97.5 | 96.8 | 88.2 | 70.6 | 69.9 | 82.1 | 875.2 |
| Record high °F | 99.0 | — | — | — | — | — | — | — | — | — | — | — | 99.0 |
| Mean daily maximum °F | 70.9 | 70.3 | 66.9 | 60.8 | 55.4 | 52.9 | 52.5 | 54.0 | 57.2 | 61.2 | 64.8 | 68.4 | 61.3 |
| Mean daily minimum °F | 50.2 | 50.0 | 47.8 | 43.5 | 40.1 | 37.6 | 36.7 | 37.6 | 39.6 | 42.3 | 45.3 | 48.0 | 43.2 |
| Record low °F | — | — | — | — | — | — | 23.2 | — | — | — | — | — | 23.2 |
| Average precipitation inches | 1.87 | 1.59 | 2.09 | 2.41 | 3.16 | 3.45 | 3.84 | 3.81 | 3.47 | 2.78 | 2.75 | 3.23 | 34.46 |
| Average precipitation days | 11.6 | 10.4 | 12.9 | 13.8 | 14.7 | 14.9 | 15.2 | 15.5 | 14.4 | 13.2 | 11.9 | 12.5 | 161 |
Source: Bureau of Meteorology (1971–2023 normals)

== Notable people ==
=== Foundational figures ===
- Lady Jane Franklin – Explorer, social reformer, and philanthropist. Instrumental in establishing the Huon Settlement and for whom the town is named.
- Sir John Franklin – British Royal Navy officer, Arctic explorer, and Lieutenant-Governor of Van Diemen's Land (1837–1843).

=== Politicians ===
Several individuals born in Franklin went on to hold state and federal political office across Australia:

- James Bayley (1882–1968) – Former member of the Australian House of Representatives (1917–1931) representing the Nationalist Party, later a state MP in Queensland for the Country and Progressive National Party (1933–1935).
- Percy Bayley (1879–1942) – Member of the Queensland Legislative Assembly for Pittsworth from 1915 to 1920.
- Meg Brown – Politician elected in 2024 to the Tasmanian House of Assembly for the Labor Party in the seat of Franklin.
- Irene Longman (1877–1964) – Community advocate and the first woman elected to the Parliament of Queensland, serving in the Queensland Legislative Assembly for Bulimba (1929–1932) as a Country and Progressive National Party member.

=== Trade unionists and activists ===
- Clarrie O'Shea (1905–1988) – Australian trade union leader and communist, best known for his 1969 jailing during a major national strike over penal powers in industrial law. Born in Franklin.

== See also ==
- Huon River
- Huon Valley Council

== Sources ==
- Ryan, Lyndall (1996). The Aboriginal Tasmanians (2nd ed.). St Leonards, New South Wales: Allen & Unwin. ISBN 9781863739658 – via National Library of Australia.
- Inspiring Place Pty Ltd (July 2003). Franklin Township Plan (PDF) (Report). Hobart, Tasmania: Huon Valley Council – via Trove.
- Ely, Richard (1989). The History of the Huon, Channel, Bruny Island Region: Printed Sources. Historical Bibliographies of Tasmania. Vol. 1. Hobart: Centre for Tasmanian Historical Studies, Department of History, University of Tasmania. ISBN 9780859014076 – via National Library of Australia.
