= Castle Forbes Bay =

Coordinates: 43°08′04″S 146°58′31″E

Castle Forbes Bay Tasmania
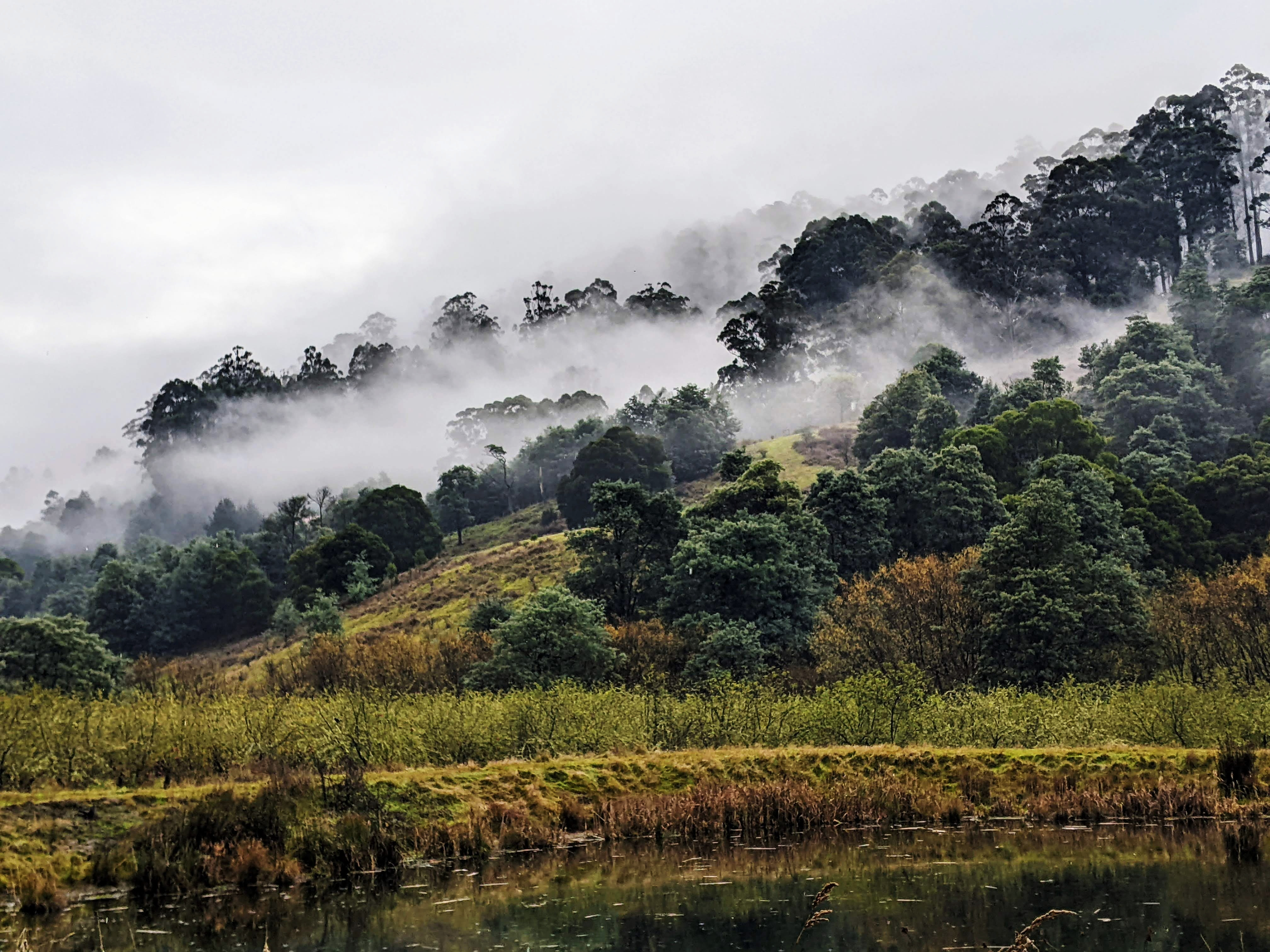
- Fog-bound mountains at Castle Forbes Bay
- Population: 159
- Postcode(s): 7116
- LGA(s): Huon Valley Council
- Region: Huon Valley

Castle Forbes Bay is a small locality in the Huon Valley, Tasmania. It is part of the Huon Valley Council. Located on the shore of the Huon River, it is a primary agricultural region and was historically a center of apple growing. Apples would be shipped from the waterfront at Castle Forbes Bay to Hobart, for export. Castle Forbes Bay's landscape is still shaped by apple orchards, though many of them are now disused or empty of trees. A large number of pickers huts, garages and apple packings dot the scenery, considered the possibly best preserved orcharding landscape in Australia.

The township was named for the ship the Castle Forbes, which in 1836 mistakenly entered the Huon River instead of the Derwent River, and was forced to unload passengers at the bay after being unable to continue onwards.

A small cemetery, now unused and maintained by Castle Forbes Bay Landcare, is located in the locality. A town hall was built in 1914 but is no longer standing.
