= Garry Cowmeadow =

Australian cricketer (born 1954)

Personal information
- Full name: Garry John Cowmeadow
- Born: 21 August 1954 (age 72); Huonville, Tasmania, Australia
- Batting: Left-handed
- Bowling: Right-arm fast-medium

Domestic team information
- Years: Team
- 1976/77–1978/79: Tasmania

Career statistics
Competition	First-class	List A
Matches	13	8
Runs scored	199	11
Batting average	13.26	2.75
100s/50s	0/0	0/0
Top score	41	8
Balls bowled	2,159	457
Wickets	29	15
Bowling average	40.31	17.26
5 wickets in innings	0	0
10 wickets in match	0	0
Best bowling	4/35	4/22
Catches/stumpings	5/–	2/–
- Source: CricketArchive, 16 August 2010

Garry John Cowmeadow (born 21 August 1954) is a former cricketer who played for Tasmania from 1976 to 1979.

Cowmeadow was born at Huonville, Tasmania and was a useful medium-fast bowler with a good economy rate, who proved well suited to the one-day game. He was a member of the Tasmanian team which played in the state's first ever Sheffield Shield match in 1977, and in the 1978–79 Gillette Cup winning side.

He also played three games of Australian rules football in the Victorian Football League for South Melbourne in 1975.
