= Tahune AirWalk =

Elevated walking track in Tasmania, Australia

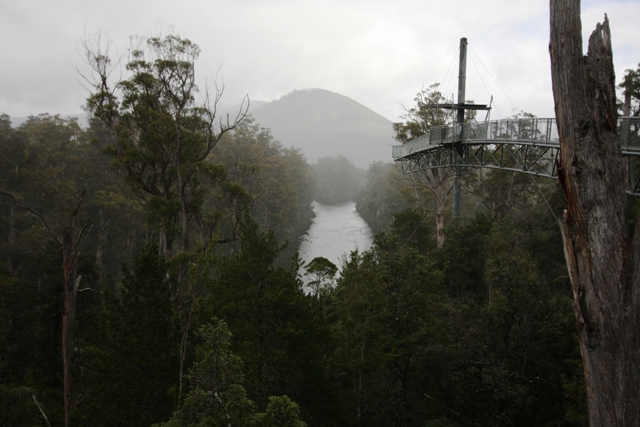
- The cantilever bridge on the Tahune Forest AirWalk
- Coordinates: 43°05′42″S 146°43′30″E
- Carries: Pedestrians
- Crosses: Huon River; Picton River
- Locale: Geeveston, Tasmania, Australia
- Owner: Ken Stronach
- Website: tahuneairwalk.com.au

Characteristics
- Design: Canopy walkway
- Material: Steel
- Total length: 620 metres (2,030 ft)
- Height: 50 metres (160 ft)

History
- Opened: 1 July 2001

Location
- Interactive map of Tahune AirWalk

The Tahune AirWalk is a steel canopy walkway located in the Tahune Forest area 29 km from Geeveston and sits over the banks of the Huon River in the Huon Valley of southern Tasmania, Australia.

== Location and features ==
The walkway is located approximately 70 kilometres (43 mi) south of Tasmania's capital city Hobart. The treetop walk overlooks the Huon and Picton Rivers joining in the far distance. The Tahune Airwalk site offers three walks onsite plus the Cable Eagle Hang Gliding.

The footbridge is a level steel structure with a steel walkway that is suspended over the treetops, as high as 50 metres (160 ft) in places. The footbridge is 620 metres (2,030 ft) long, with 1.6 kilometres (0.99 mi) of access paths to the bridge and 112 steps to climb to the peak. Transport is provided to the start of the AirWalk for those with walking difficulties. The visitor centre has a fully licensed cafe and is open on a daily basis. Plus browse through the extensive range of exclusive souvenirs. The site has WIFI available at the visitor centre.

== Ecology, flora and fauna ==
The airwalk is situated in a wet sclerophyll forest which contains many rainforest elements, including Myrtle Beech, Sassafrass, and Leatherwood trees. The broader region contains a mosaic of wet and dry sclerophyll forest types, as well as rainforest in undisturbed areas. Notable plant species include Eucalyptus Regnans and Eucalyptus Obliqua which may be seen as tall, dominant canopy trees.

== Gallery ==
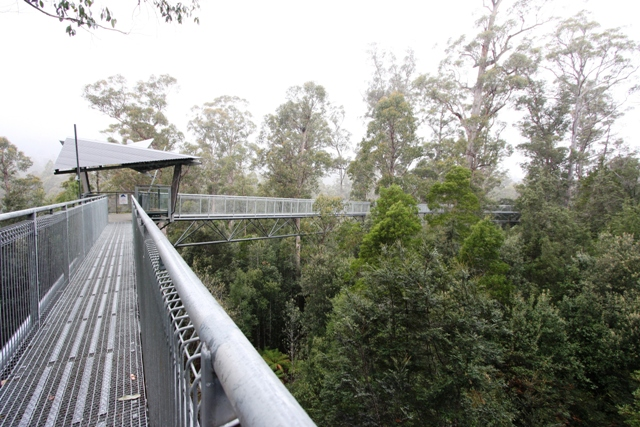
View from the Tahune Forest AirWalk.

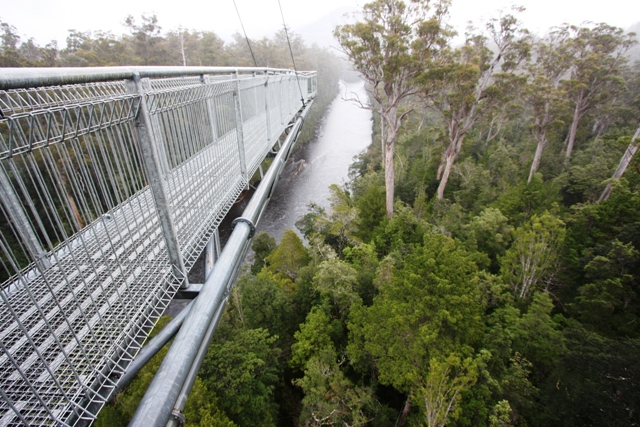
View from the cantilever bridge on the Tahune Forest AirWalk.

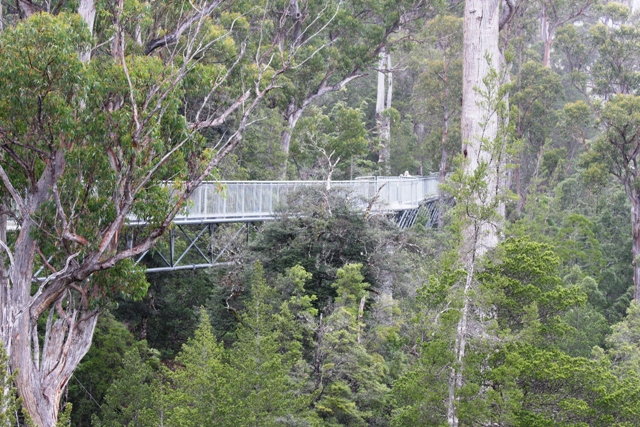
View of the Tahune Forest AirWalk gantry winding through the trees.

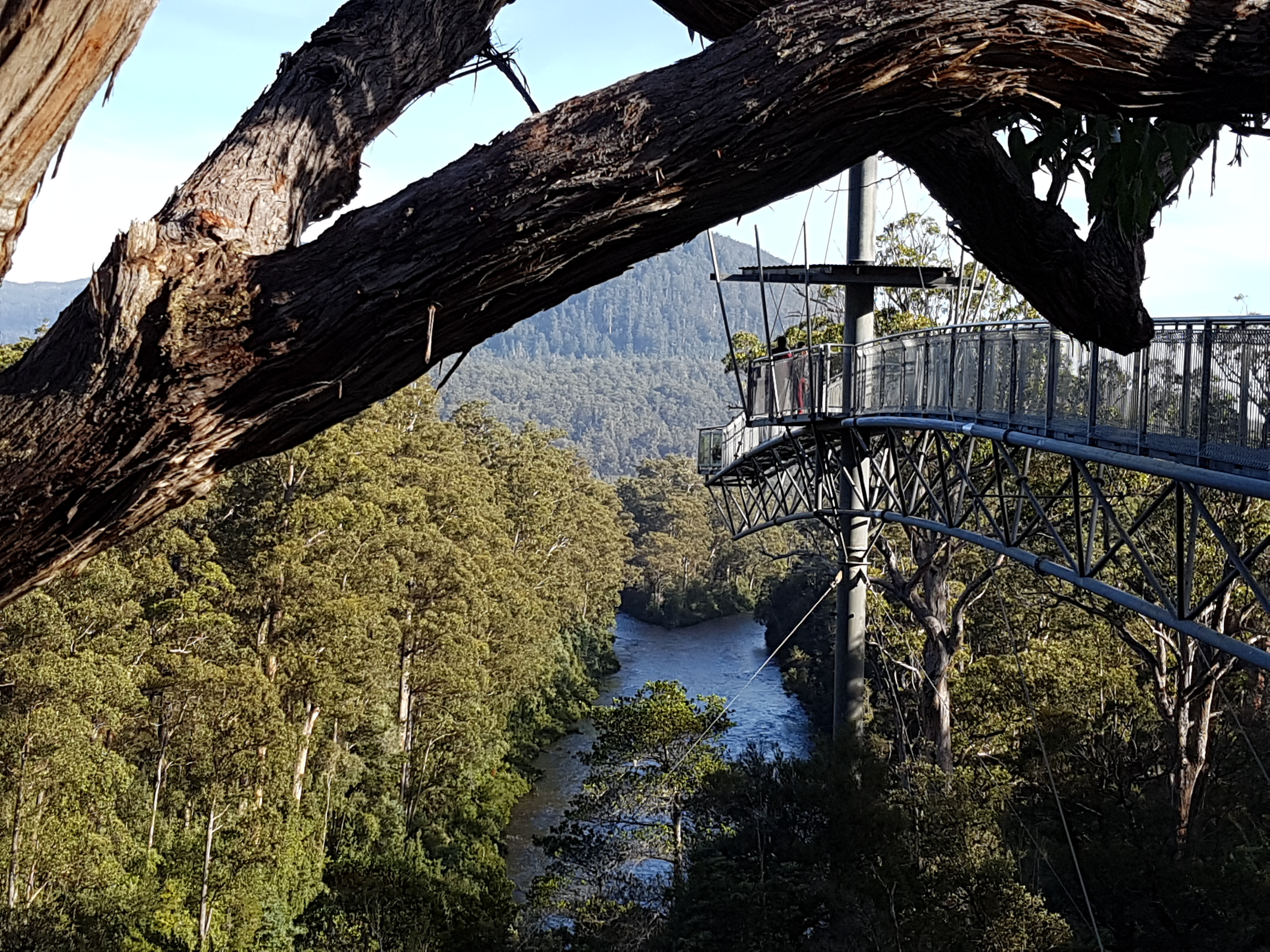

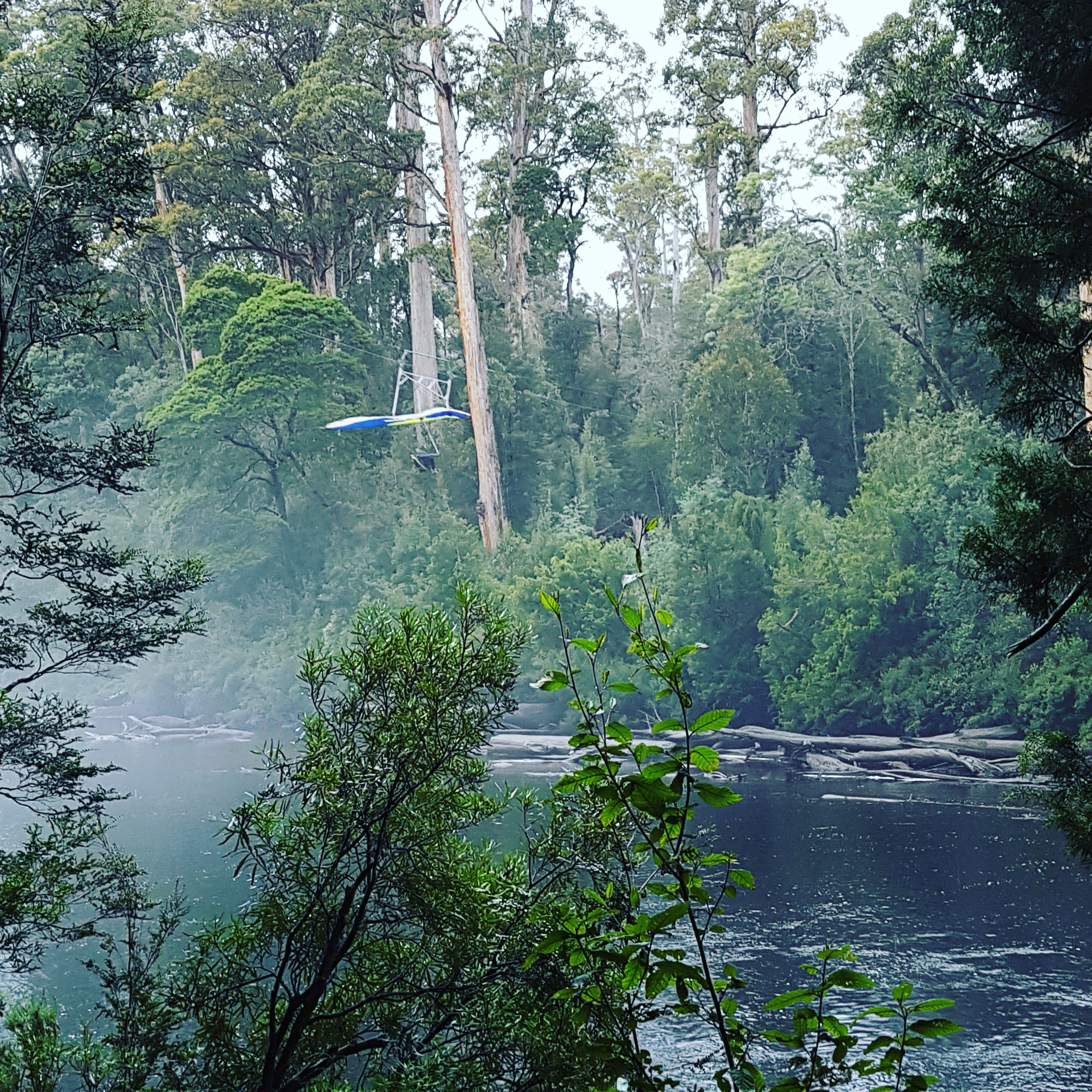
Cable Eagle Hang Gliding

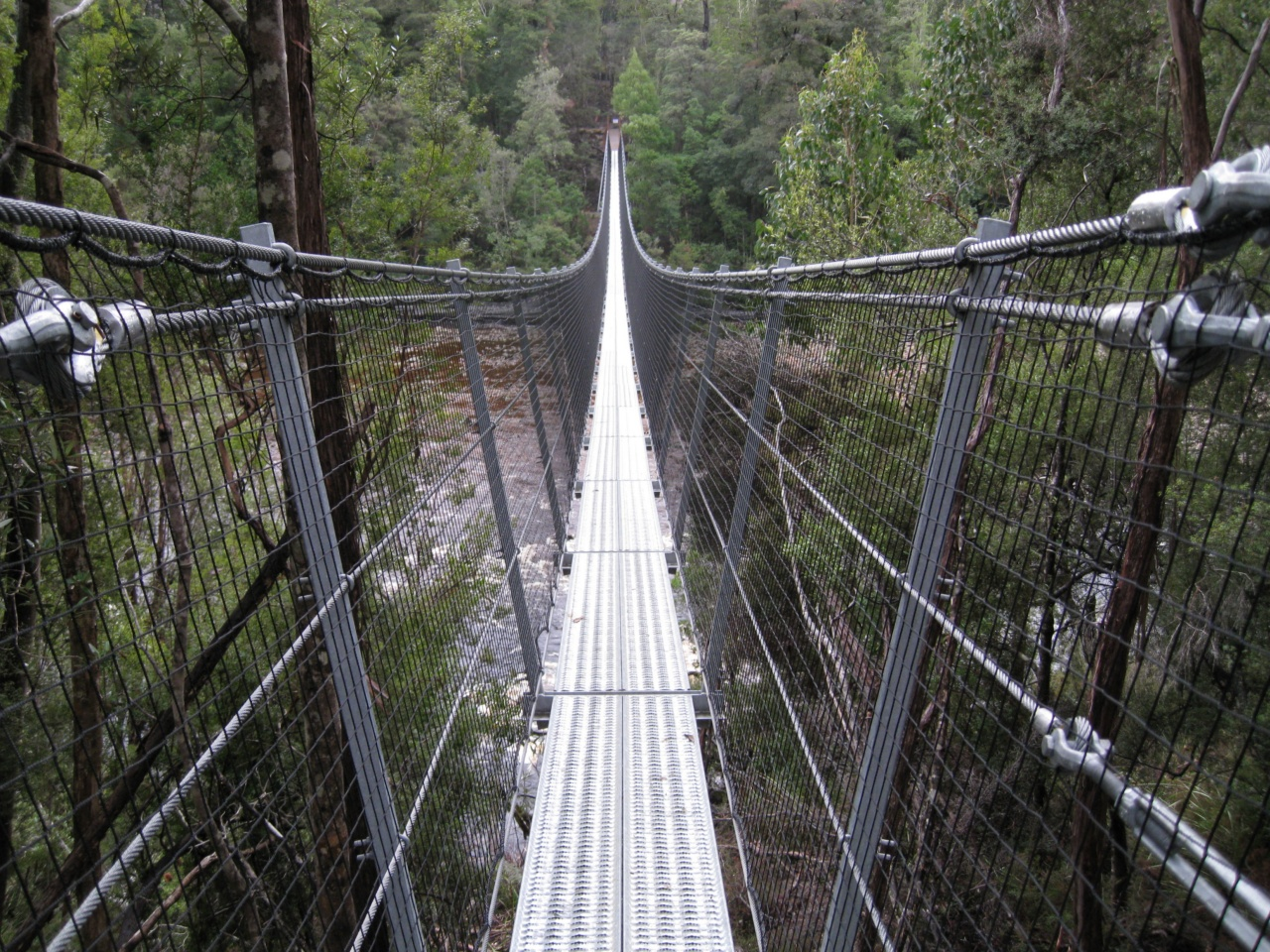
Swinging Bridge

== See also ==
- Geeveston
