= MV Cartela =

Transport vessel in Tasmania, Australia

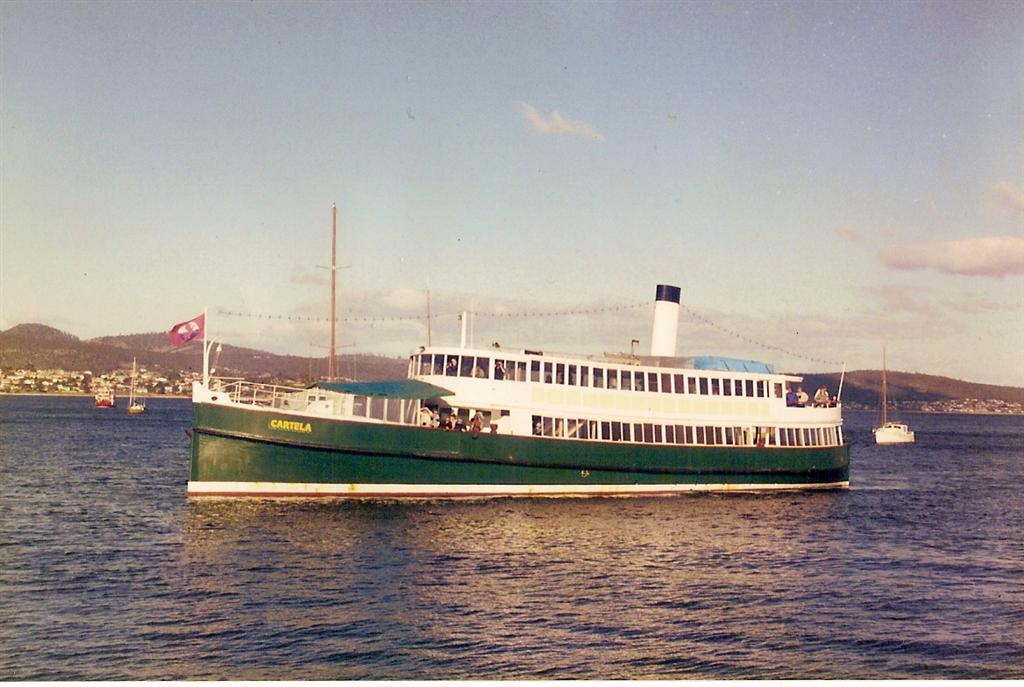
- MV Cartela about 1995

History
- Name: MV Cartela
- Builder: Purdon & Featherstone
- Launched: 1912
- Identification: IMO number: 5065160

General characteristics
- Tonnage: 194 long tons (197 t)
- Length: 123 ft (37 m)
- Beam: 25 ft (7.6 m)
- Draught: 8 ft 6 in (2.59 m)

MV Cartela is an excursion vessel operating on the River Derwent in Hobart, Tasmania, Australia. It is Australia's oldest continuously licensed passenger vessel, although there are several older vessels still in service that have been restored after lengthy periods in dereliction.

The Cartela is a motor vessel of 194 long tons (197 t) gross, 77 long tons (78 t) net register, and is 123 feet (37 m) in overall length (111 feet (34 m) keel).

== History ==
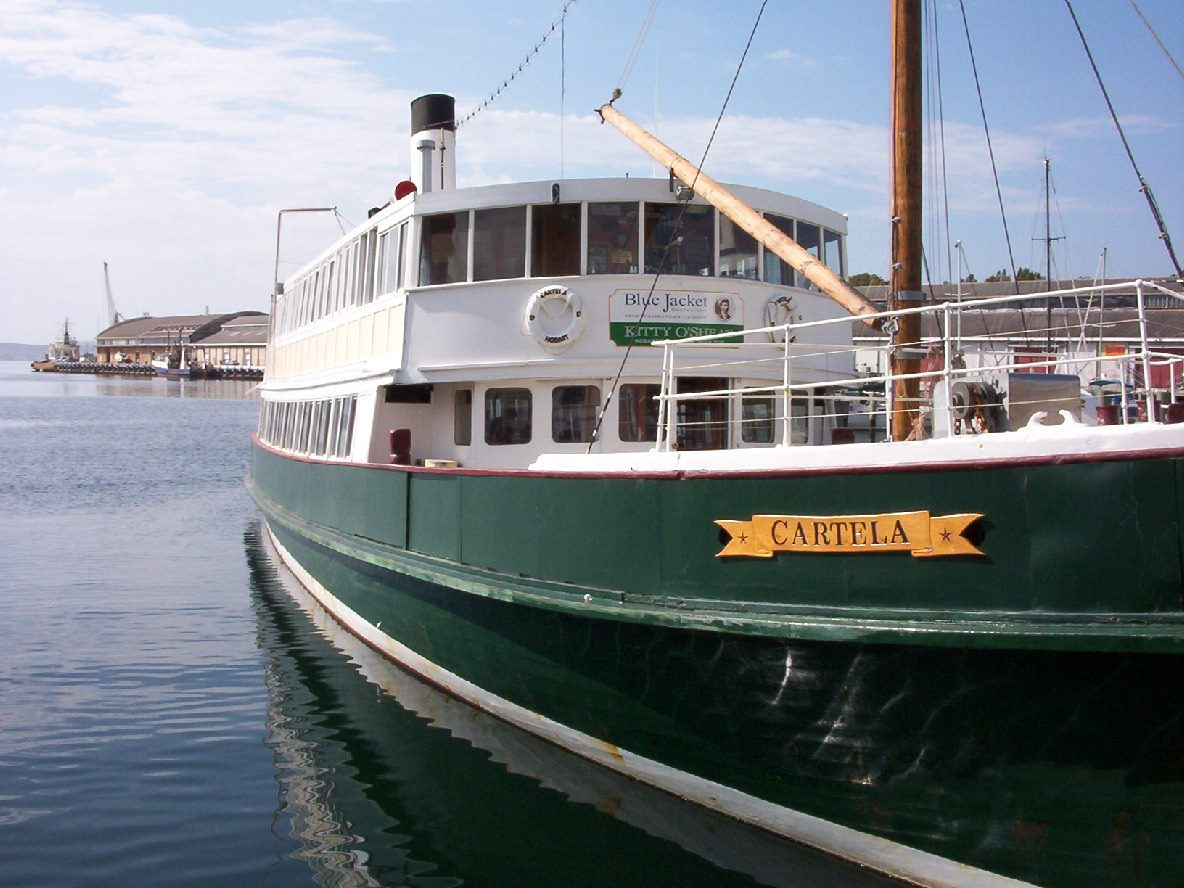
Cartela at Hobart in February 2003

The Cartela was built in 1912 at Battery Point, Hobart, by Purdon & Featherstone for the Huon Channel and Peninsula Steamship Company. It was designed to operate as a cargo and passenger vessel in the coastal and riverine trades south and south-east of the city. The Cartela was primarily constructed to replace an earlier vessel, the Awittaka, that had recently been sold to the Solomon Islands Government, and was specially designed to be the fastest vessel in the premier excursion trade. That was achieved by fitting the vessel with a powerful triple-expansion steam engine (500 indicated horsepower (370 kW)), and a large-capacity boiler that allowed lengthy periods of operation at maximum speed without losing pressure – a problem faced by both its predecessor and chief rival the 152-long-ton (154 t) Togo. Cartela and Togo regularly competed in an unofficial race held on Christmas Day until 1931, and both won five races each. In 1926, the two vessels collided off Battery Point and the Togo was forced aground. Because the vessels had passed out of state-controlled harbour waters into federally controlled coastal waters during the course of the race, a Royal Commission was held into whether the Marine Board of Hobart was entitled to hold an inquiry.

At the outbreak of World War I, Cartela was requisitioned by the Royal Australian Navy for use as an examination vessel. protecting the port of Hobart. Most of Cartela's service until after World War II involved operating passenger and cargo services between Hobart, the Tasman Peninsula, and ports on the D'Entrecasteaux Channel, with a proportion of excursion activities up and down the River Derwent. It occasionally performed other duties, including a voyage across Bass Strait to Melbourne during a seamen's strike in 1919, and acting as a tug, before dedicated tug-boats were employed in Hobart after World War II. One significant tow was the rescue of the dismasted barque Inverness-shire, a vessel more than ten times its size, from Storm Bay to Hobart in 1915. A legal case arising from that event is still occasionally cited as a reference regarding the legal distinction between "towage" and "salvage".

Improved road services connecting outlying regions of south-eastern Tasmania brought an end to commercial river steamer services, so by the 1950s, the vessel was almost exclusively engaged in excursion work around Hobart for new owners Roche Brothers In 1958, Cartela was extensively altered, being converted from a steamship to a motor vessel. In 1975, following the Tasman Bridge disaster, it was fitted with more powerful engines for use as a ferry.

Cartela is now owned by the SteamShip Cartela Trust. In recognition of it being one of the very few timber vessels that has remained in continuous commercial service for a century, in 2016 it was announced that it would undergo a complete renovation and be returned to steam power. That would including the refurbishment of the original Plenty & Son steam engine. The trust received A$1,000,000 in state government funding in 2023, but in February 2025 the vessel had partially sunk at its berth in Franklin. It was successfully refloated on the 25th March.

== Engines ==
=== First engine ===
Cartela's first engine was a reciprocating triple-expansion steam engine built by Plenty & Son, Newbury, England. It had three cylinders, powering a four-bladed propeller 4 feet 6 inches (1.37 m) in diameter. 500 indicated horsepower (370 kW). The engine was used from 1912 to 1958. Coal bunker capacity was 20 long tons (20 t).

=== Second engine ===
Cartela's second engine was a Vivian 8-cylinder diesel engine 160 horsepower (120 kW) (@ 600RPM), powering a single propeller 57 inches (1,400 mm) by 48 inches (1,200 mm). The engine was used until 1975.

=== Third engine ===
Cartela's third engine was installed to give it the speed provided by its original steam engine. It was a 6-cylinder turbocharged Caterpillar diesel engine, producing 365 horsepower (272 kW) (@ 1800RPM). Fuel tank capacity was 1,800 litres.
