= Huon Valley Council =

- Local government area
- Interactive map of Huon Valley Council
- Coordinates: 43.2546°S 146.5895°E
- Country: Australia
- State: Tasmania
- Region: Huonville, Huon Valley, and Macquarie Island
- Established: 2 April 1993
- Council seat: Huonville

Government
  - Mayor: Sally Doyle
  - State electorate: Franklin
  - Federal division: Franklin

Area
  - Total: 5,507 km^{2} (2,126 sq mi)

Population
  - Total: 19,454 (2024)
  - Density: 3.5326/km^{2} (9.1494/sq mi)
- Website: Huon Valley Council
LGAs around Huon Valley Council
Derwent Valley	Derwent Valley	Glenorchy
West Coast	Huon Valley Council	Kingborough
Indian Ocean	Indian Ocean	Pacific Ocean

Huon Valley Council is a local government body in Tasmania, covering most of the south of the state. Huon Valley is classified as a rural local government area and has a population of 19,454. Towns and localities of the region include Cygnet, Dover, Franklin, Geeveston, Southport and the largest principal town, Huonville.

== History and attributes ==
In 1993 the municipalities of Esperance, Huon and Port Cygnet were amalgamated to form the Huon Valley Council. The Council handles such local administration as is required for the uninhabited Macquarie Island, which is located some 1400 km southeast of Tasmania proper, having previously been under the aegis of Esperance Municipality.

=== Demographics ===
Huon Valley is classified as rural, agricultural and very large under the Australian Classification of Local Governments.

The townships in the south east region of Tasmania that experienced the largest growth over the decade ending June 2011 were Huonville, Franklin (where the population was up by 1,300 people) and Cygnet (up by 440).

== Council ==
Council members as elected in 2022 elections.

Party	Councillor	Position
Independent	Sally Doyle	Mayor
Tasmanian Labor	Toby Thorpe	Deputy Mayor
Independent	Debbie Armstrong	Councillor
Tasmanian Greens	Paul Gibson	Councillor
Independent	David O'Neill	Councillor
Independent	Mark Jessop	Councillor
Independent	Cathy Temby	Councillor
Independent	Andrew Burgess	Councillor
Tasmanian Greens	Lukas Mrosek	Councillor

== 2016 Council misconduct and removal from office ==
In 2016 the entire Huon Valley Council was removed from council by the state Minister for Local Government after a long period of gross dysfunction and misconduct. The municipality was subsequently put under controlled of a Commissioner; former Glenorchy mayor and Elwick MLC Adriana Taylor, until new elections were held over a three-week period concluding on 30 October 2018.

== Localities ==
- Abels Bay
- Bishop and Clerk Islets
- Brooks Bay
- Cairns Bay
- Castle Forbes Bay
- Charlotte Cove
- Crabtree
- Cradoc
- Cygnet
- Deep Bay
- Dover
- Eggs and Bacon Bay
- Franklin
- Garden Island Creek
- Gardners Bay
- Geeveston
- Glaziers Bay
- Glen Huon
- Glendevie
- Grove
- Hastings
- Huonville
- Ida Bay
- Judbury
- Lonnavale
- Lower Longley
- Lower Wattle Grove
- Lucaston
- Lune River
- Lymington
- Macquarie Island
- Mountain River
- Nicholls Rivulet
- Pelverata
- Petcheys Bay
- Police Point
- Port Huon
- Raminea
- Randalls Bay
- Ranelagh
- Recherche
- Southport
- Southport Lagoon
- Southwest
- Strathblane
- Surges Bay
- Surveyors Bay
- Upper Woodstock
- Verona Sands
- Waterloo
- Wattle Grove
- Woodstock

== See also ==
- Local government areas of Tasmania
