= Ranelagh, Tasmania =

Ranelagh
- Suburb
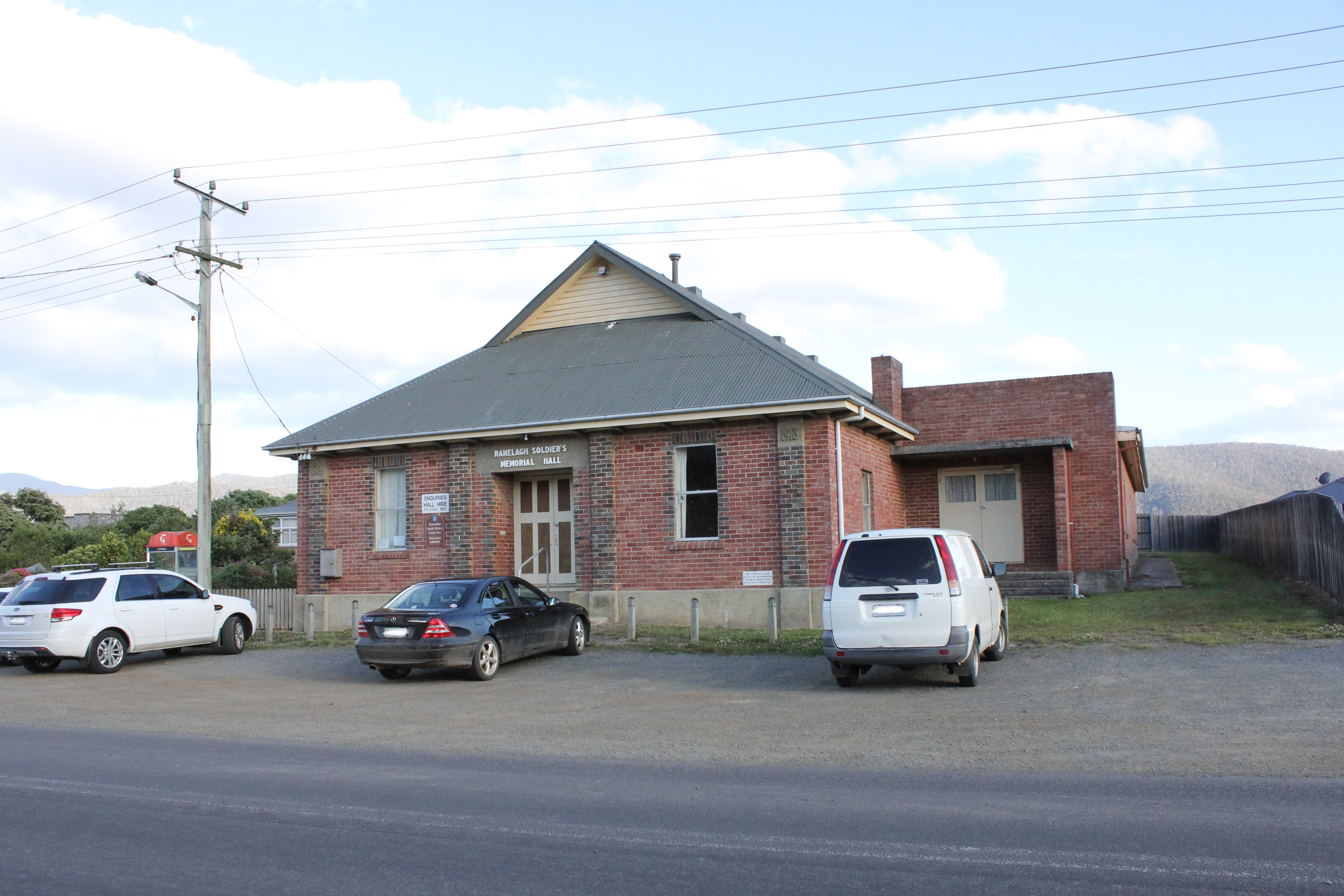
- Ranelagh Soldiers Memorial Hall

- Coordinates: 43°01′S 147°02′E
- Country: Australia
- State: Tasmania
- LGA: Huon Valley Council

Government
  - State electorate: Franklin
  - Federal division: Franklin

Population
  - Total: 1,484 (2021 census)
- Postcode: 7109
Suburbs around Ranelagh
Mountain River	Lucaston	Crabtree
Judbury	Ranelagh	Grove
Glen Huon	Huonville	Huonville

Ranelagh is a semi-rural township in the Huon Valley of Tasmania, Australia. It is a satellite town located directly adjacent to Huonville. Formerly an agricultural area, Ranelagh is now a tourist destination and residential locality for commuters working in surrounding regions. At the 2021 census, Ranelagh had a population of 1,484.

The town is best known for the Ranelagh Showgrounds, which host the annual Huon Show and the Taste of the Huon festival, both major tourism events for the Huon Valley region.

== Etymology ==
Ranelagh previously shared the name Victoria with neighbouring Huonville. Huonville was renamed in 1891 when it was officially gazetted as a town.

== Features ==
Ranelagh is centered around Marguerite Street and Wilmot Road. Marguerite Street includes the Ranelagh Soldiers Memorial Hall (opened in 1924), the Summer Kitchen Bakery, the Ranelagh General Store, and the Ranelagh Showgrounds located on the corner of Marguerite Street and Ranelagh Road.

Wilmot Road features the heritage-listed Clifton estate (formerly operated as Matilda's of Ranelagh), St Mary of the Cross Catholic Church, and St James Anglican Church with its associated cemetery. The locality is also home to the Jimmy Watson Memorial Trophy-winning Home Hill Winery and the Huon Bush Retreats eco-tourism accommodation.
