= Dover, Tasmania =

Dover
- Town
- Coordinates: 43°18′S 147°1′E
- Country: Australia
- State: Tasmania
- LGA: Huon Valley Council

Government
  - State electorate: Franklin
  - Federal division: Franklin
- Elevation: 17 m (56 ft)

Population
  - Total: 923 (2021 census)
- Postcode: 7117
- Mean max temp: 16.6 °C (61.9 °F)
- Mean min temp: 6.9 °C (44.4 °F)
- Annual rainfall: 872.9 mm (34.37 in)

Dover is the southernmost town of its size in Australia, on the western shore of Port Esperance.

At the 2021 census Dover had a population of 923, of whom 288 were aged under 40 years. 118 residents (including 59 of the 288 residents aged under 40 years) identified as 'Aboriginal' and/or 'Torres Strait Islander.' 83% of residents were born in Australia, 6% in the United Kingdom, 2% in New Zealand and about 1% each in China, Canada, Korea, the USA, Ireland and Nepal. 197 residents were employed, including 54% in Agriculture, Forestry and Fishing, 6% each in construction, retail and health care/ social assistance, and 5% each in public administration and professional services.

== Etymology ==
The word Dover, first recorded in its Latinised form of Portus Dubris, derives from the Brythonic word for waters (dwfr in Middle Welsh). The same element is present in the name of a French commune (Douvres) and in Modern Welsh (Dofr).

== History ==
The Dover area was first inhabited by the Lyluequonny people, who were studied in detail by the French naturalists on the d'Entrecasteaux expedition in 1793.

A convict probation station the Dover Convict Probation Station was established in the 1840s, and was in use between 1844 and 1848. The Dover Museum and Gallery reports that convicts were accommodated on Hope Island or sent to Southport, and that at one time swimming was prohibited in Port Esperance due to the danger posed by sharks attracted by whaling activities.

The place name of Blubber Head, at the northern entrance to Port Esperance, indicates that shore-based bay whaling activity may have taken place here in the 19th century.

Port Esperance Post Office, which opened on 6 February 1856, was renamed "Dover" in 1895.

In 2013, the Dover Hotel pub/tavern was engulfed by fire and destroyed.

Club activities of the Port Esperance Sailing Club are documented as dating to 1858 – when a regatta was held – and may date back further. Fire destroyed the club building on the night of 23 April 2020. Community response from across Tasmania, as well as beyond, led to the building of a new clubhouse, which ultimately opened on 17 March 2024. While the basic building is usable and many of the traditional community activities resumed, the cost impacts of COVID-19 mean that a number of the club's new facilities are yet to be used.

== Climate ==
Dover has a marine climate (Cfb) with consistently cool, damp winters and relatively dry summers. Due to its far-southern latitude and location more exposed than Hobart, snow occurs to beach level on an average of 2.3 days per year, with temperatures notably cooler than those of the capital and a pronounced winter rainfall peak. The highest recorded temperature in Dover was 40.1 °C (104.2 °F) in March 2019, more than 20 °C above the mean daily maximum for March.

Climate data for Dover (1990–2024, rainfall to 1901); 20 m AMSL; 43.33° S, 147.00° E
Month	Jan	Feb	Mar	Apr	May	Jun	Jul	Aug	Sep	Oct	Nov	Dec	Year
Record high °C (°F)	39.6 (103.3)	37.4 (99.3)	40.1 (104.2)	30.9 (87.6)	25.2 (77.4)	19.2 (66.6)	19.8 (67.6)	22.6 (72.7)	27.7 (81.9)	31.9 (89.4)	34.2 (93.6)	38.0 (100.4)	40.1 (104.2)
Mean daily maximum °C (°F)	21.2 (70.2)	20.9 (69.6)	19.5 (67.1)	17.0 (62.6)	14.6 (58.3)	12.6 (54.7)	12.3 (54.1)	13.1 (55.6)	14.8 (58.6)	16.4 (61.5)	17.9 (64.2)	19.4 (66.9)	16.6 (62.0)
Mean daily minimum °C (°F)	10.5 (50.9)	10.2 (50.4)	9.0 (48.2)	7.2 (45.0)	5.7 (42.3)	3.9 (39.0)	3.6 (38.5)	3.9 (39.0)	5.0 (41.0)	6.3 (43.3)	7.9 (46.2)	9.1 (48.4)	6.9 (44.4)
Record low °C (°F)	3.1 (37.6)	2.6 (36.7)	1.9 (35.4)	−2.0 (28.4)	−1.5 (29.3)	−2.0 (28.4)	−3.4 (25.9)	−1.8 (28.8)	−2.1 (28.2)	−0.5 (31.1)	0.8 (33.4)	1.7 (35.1)	−3.4 (25.9)
Average precipitation mm (inches)	52.1 (2.05)	50.0 (1.97)	62.4 (2.46)	65.7 (2.59)	72.7 (2.86)	79.3 (3.12)	87.6 (3.45)	91.9 (3.62)	83.5 (3.29)	86.2 (3.39)	71.1 (2.80)	69.9 (2.75)	872.9 (34.37)
Average rainy days (≥ 0.2 mm)	11.6	10.8	13.0	14.4	16.1	16.0	18.7	18.3	17.5	17.5	15.4	14.3	183.6
Average afternoon relative humidity (%)	59	60	61	66	69	73	71	66	63	62	62	59	64
