= Cygnet, Tasmania =

Cygnet
- Town
- Coordinates: 43°09′S 147°04′E
- Country: Australia
- State: Tasmania
- LGA: Huon Valley Council
- Location: 56 km (35 mi) SW of Hobart; 18 km (11 mi) S of Huonville

Government
  - State electorate: Franklin
  - Federal division: Franklin

Population
  - Total: 4,802 (2021 census)
- Postcode: 7112
- Mean max temp: 16.8 °C (62.2 °F)
- Mean min temp: 6.0 °C (42.8 °F)
- Annual rainfall: 892 mm (35.1 in)

Cygnet (/sɪɡnət/; SIG-nət) is a town in the Huon Valley, south of Huonville, Tasmania.

== History ==
The Indigenous people occupied a large territory in South East Tasmania, including Cygnet, Hobart and Bruny Island. Tasmanian leader & elder, Wooraddy, came from Bruny Island. The bay was named Port des Cygnes (Port of Swans) by French navigator Bruni D'Entrecasteaux in 1793, because he observed a large number of black swans in the area.

The first European settler in the district was William Nichols in 1834. Nichols received a grant for three hundred and twenty acres of land on the north side of Port Cygnet in 1829. After the land had been cleared and accommodation built, Nichols moved his family to this property. At the time the property was only accessible by a walking track from Browns River or up the river by boat.

His grandson, John Wilson, established a shipbuilding business at what was now known as Port Cygnet. Until the end of the 1850s, timber was the main source of income as land was cleared. Timber was exported from the area for firewood, house building and fence palings.

In 1840 the township of Port Cygnet was surveyed. Land was advertised for sale to the public in 1848. The Post Office opened on 1 January 1854. The town was known as Port Cygnet until 1895, Lovett until 1915 and then Cygnet. In 2021 the television series " Deadloch " was filmed here

== Facilities ==
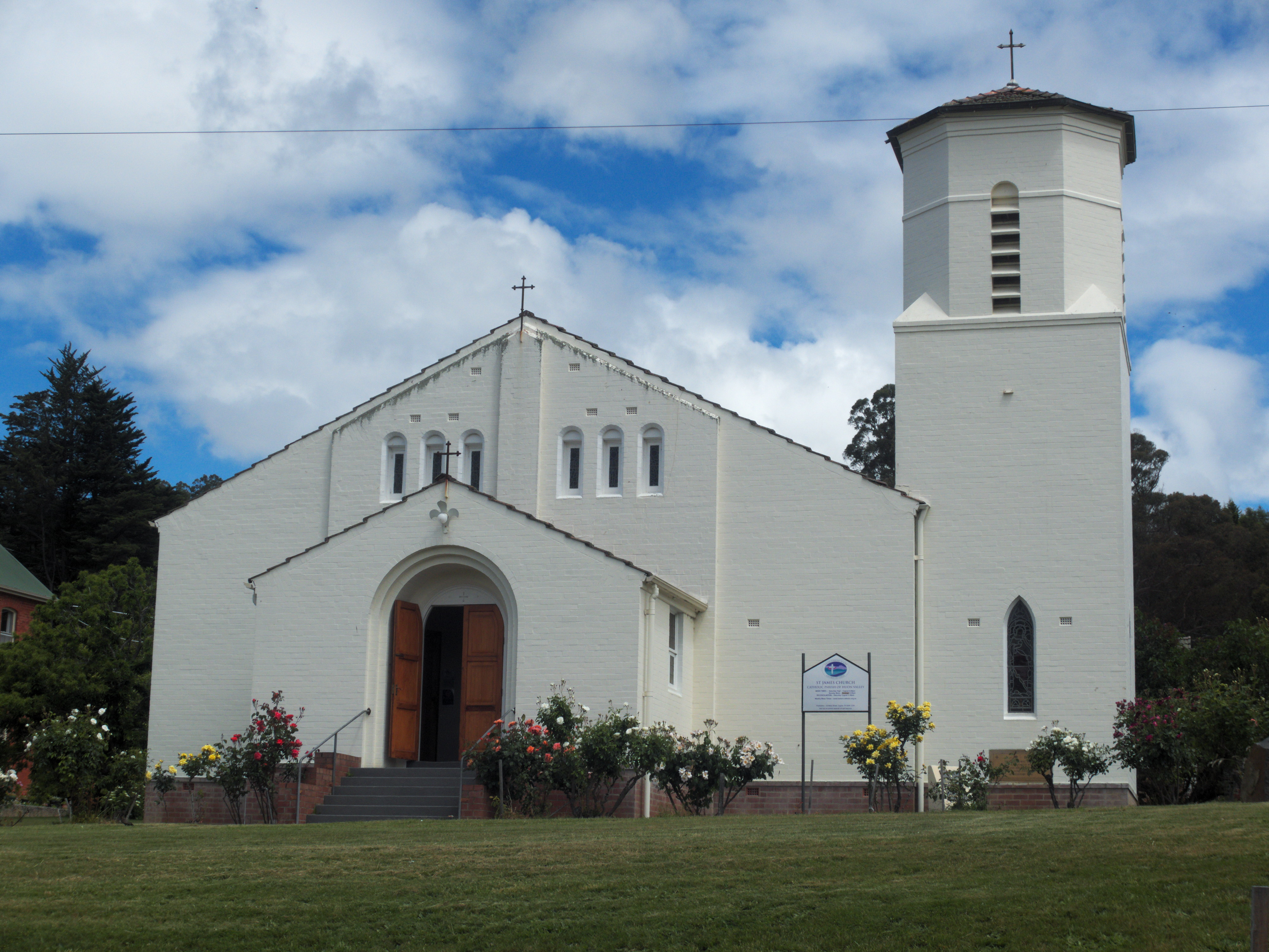
St James Church

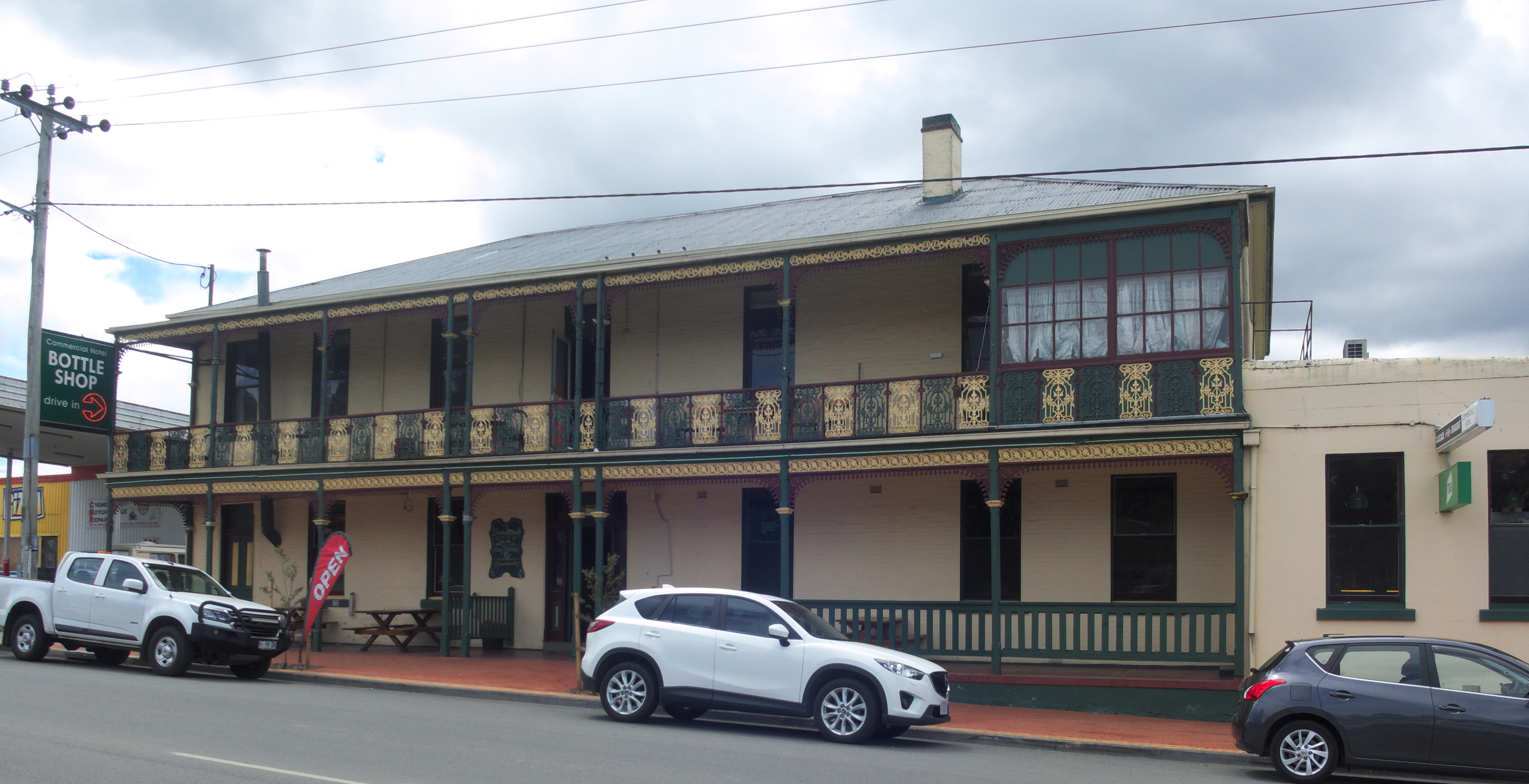
Commercial Hotel

There are two pubs, three bottle shops, one RSL club, two petrol stations (one with an ATM), a Bendigo Bank, Catholic and Anglican churches, three cafe/restaurants, a hardware store, three doctor's clinics, a couple of backpackers hostels, a bookshop, newsagent, two hairdressing salons, two butchers, takeaway food shop, organic grocer and various other clothing and special interest stores including a local cider makers bar and cellar door. There are also several art studios, a furniture & homewares store, a print workshop with an old printing press, a library linked to the collection of the State Library of Tasmania, a children's toy library and a museum.

Cygnet is popular amongst artists, musicians, craftspeople and creative types and the home of the annual Cygnet Folk Festival, Cygnet Folk Festival [1] which occurs in early January and attracts people from mainland Australia and the world. Festival musicians are billeted with locals.

Other events in Cygnet include the Harvest Festival, film festivals (e.g. "Bollywood Film Festival"), annual art exhibitions , dances and numerous other social gatherings. Cygnet is also home to the annual "Cygnet Cup" a snail race held in November.

The local area also supports a farming population and there are many second homes, sometimes known as "shacks" in Tasmania. About a mile south of the town centre is Port Cygnet (home of the Port Cygnet Yacht Club), with road and walking access to Cygnet. Cygnet and surrounding suburbs have access to the D'Entrecasteaux Channel on one side and the Huon River on the other.

Cygnet is in the Huon Valley Council municipality.

Increasing numbers of people and families are moving to Tasmania and the Huon Valley. Cygnet, like other towns within the Huon Valley and Tasmania, have seen an increase in property sales to foreign and interstate buyers. Many retirees are moving also.

== Notable residents ==
Peter Wright (MI5 officer), the author of Spycatcher, lived here from 1976 until his death in 1995.
