= Huonville =

- Town
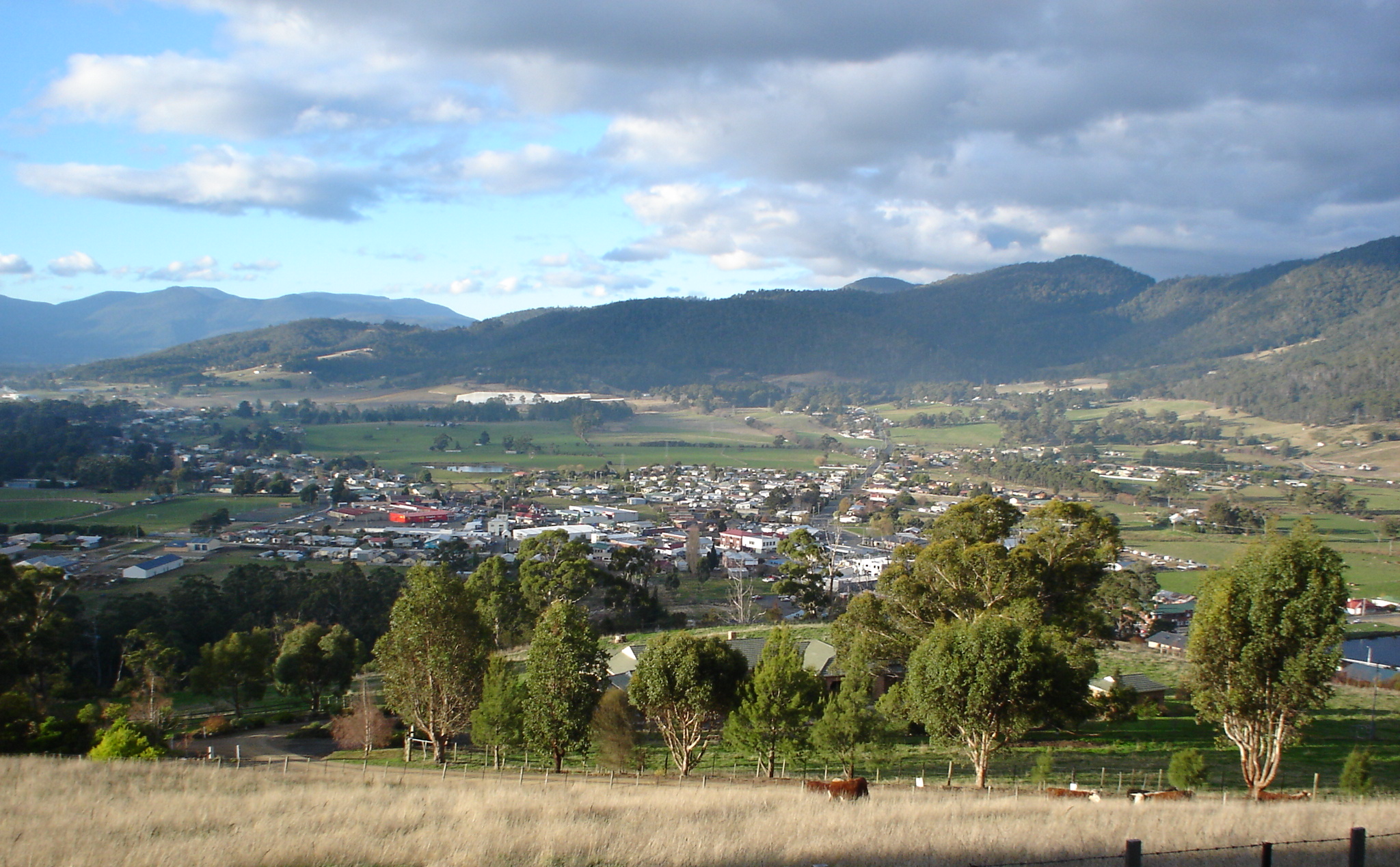
- Huonville township from Scenic Hill

- Coordinates: 43°01′50″S 147°02′55″E
- Country: Australia
- State: Tasmania
- LGA: Huon Valley Council
- Location: 17 km (11 mi) from Cygnet; 22 km (14 mi) from Geeveston; 38 km (24 mi) from Hobart
- Established: 1891

Government
  - State electorate: Franklin
  - Federal division: Franklin

Population
  - Total: 3,002 (2021 census)
- Time zone: UTC+10 (AEST)
  - Summer (DST): UTC+11 (AEDT)
- Postcode: 7109
- Mean max temp: 17.1 °C (62.8 °F)
- Mean min temp: 5.8 °C (42.4 °F)
- Annual rainfall: 744.7 mm (29.32 in)

Huonville (/ˈhjuːɒnvɪl/) HYOO-on-vil is a town located on the banks of the Huon River in the Huon Valley, in the south-east of Tasmania, Australia. It serves as the administrative centre of the Huon Valley Council and is the largest town in the Huon Valley region. Situated approximately 38 kilometres south of the state capital, Hobart, Huonville acts as a gateway to Tasmania’s wilderness areas and the Southwest National Park.

The town is historically significant for its role in Tasmania's apple-growing industry, earning the Huon Valley the nickname "Golden Valley" due to its production of Golden Delicious apples. While the apple industry has declined, Huonville remains an important agricultural hub, now also known for aquaculture, including salmon farming, and for tourism. As the most centrally located township in the Huon Valley, Huonville serves as a hub for visitors exploring the region’s scenic landscapes, artisanal food and drink, and outdoor activities such as hiking, kayaking, and fishing.

Huonville has a population of 3,002 according to the 2021 census. It is known for its proximity to the Huon Highway, which connects the town to nearby communities and Hobart, making it a central regional township for transport and trade. The township has historically faced environmental challenges, including vulnerability to floods and bushfires, which have affected the town in recent years. Despite these challenges, Huonville continues to thrive as a hub for eco-tourism and sustainable agriculture, preserving its rural heritage while adapting to modern economic and environmental conditions.

== History ==
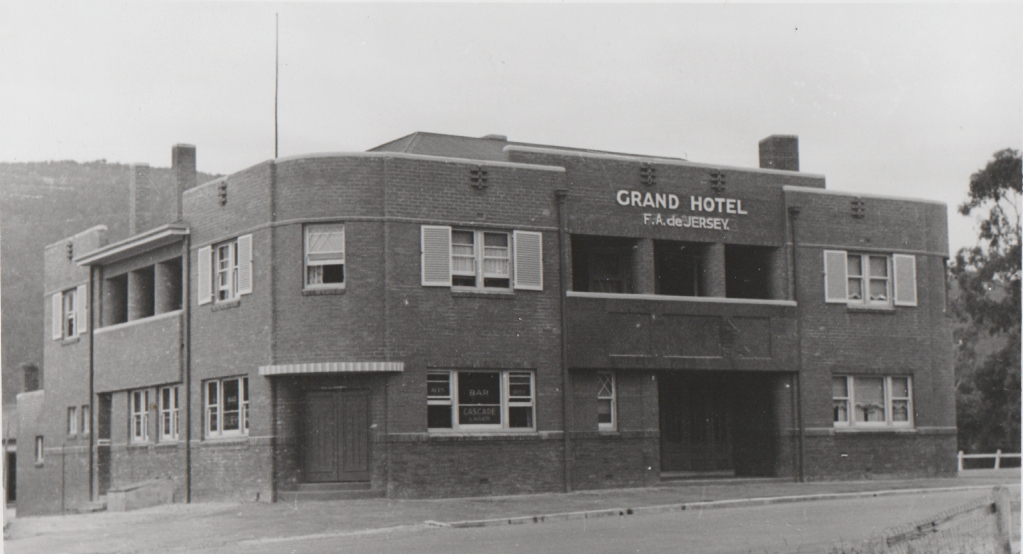
Grand Hotel, Huonville, 1940s

Before European settlement, the area now known as Huonville and the surrounding Huon Valley was home to the Mellukerdee people, one of the First Nations groups of southern Tasmania. Greatly residing along the banks of the Huon River, the Mellukerdee people's connection to the land and waterway formed an integral part of their daily life, relying on its rich resources for fishing, hunting, and cultural practices. European colonisation, beginning in the early 19th century, severely disrupted the Mellukerdee way of life, and many were displaced from their lands as British settlers established farming and logging operations in the valley.

European exploration of the Huon River began in 1792, led by Admiral Bruni d'Entrecasteaux during his expedition to search for the missing French explorer Jean-François de Galaup, comte de La Pérouse. The river was named by d'Entrecasteaux in honour of his second-in-command, Captain Jean-Michel Huon de Kermadec. Settlement in the region began in the 1840s, with William and Thomas Walton among the first settlers to establish farms in the fertile valley.

Huonville, initially a smaller settlement, grew around the key bridge crossing the Huon River, which made it a strategic location for transport and trade. While the nearby township of Ranelagh was initially planned as the central settlement, Huonville developed into a bustling centre of the Huon Valley and was officially declared a town in 1891.

=== Apple production ===
By the late 19th century, apple growing became the dominant agricultural activity in the Huon Valley. The region’s fertile soils and temperate climate were ideal for growing apples, and Huonville played a central role in processing and distributing the fruit. Throughout the 20th century, the valley became known as the "Apple Bowl of Tasmania", with apples being one of Tasmania’s key exports. At its peak, Huonville and the surrounding areas produced 83% of Tasmania’s apples, and the industry was so prominent that Tasmania earned the nickname "The Apple Isle".

Apple production reached its height in the mid-20th century, when apples were exported globally, particularly to the United Kingdom. However, the industry began to decline in the latter half of the century due to a combination of factors, including changing global trade policies, competition from other apple-producing regions, and a reduction in demand from traditional markets.

Despite the decline, apple orchards remain an important part of the Huon Valley's economy, and Huonville continues to celebrate its apple-growing heritage. The town hosts the annual Huon Valley Mid-Winter Festival, which includes a traditional “wassailing” ceremony to bless the apple trees, and it has become a centre for boutique cider production in Tasmania.

The town has also faced environmental challenges, including record floods in 2016 and significant bushfires in 2019, which have highlighted the region’s vulnerability to the effects of climate change.

== Economy ==
Huonville remains an important hub for agriculture in the Huon Valley, with the apple industry still playing a key role, alongside other fruit crops such as cherries and berries. However, aquaculture, especially salmon farming, has become a major industry in the region. Huon Aquaculture, one of Tasmania's largest salmon producers, operates farms in the nearby Huon River and d'Entrecasteaux Channel.

The town is also emerging as a destination for tourism, particularly for visitors seeking artisan food and wine, as well as outdoor activities such as hiking, kayaking, and fishing. Huonville is situated on the edge of Tasmania's wilderness, making it a popular stop for visitors exploring the region's national parks.

== Demographics ==
Historical population
Year	Pop.	±%
2001	1,598	—
2006	1,705	+6.7%
2011	1,741	+2.1%
2016	2,714	+55.9%
2021	3,002	+10.6%
Source: Australian Bureau of Statistics census data.

Huonville's demographics reflect its role as a rural hub for the surrounding agricultural areas. The town has experienced modest population growth in recent years, with the population reaching 3,002 at the 2021 census. Including the surrounding rural areas, classified as Statistical Areas Level 2 (SA2s), the broader population totals 4,579 residents.

The majority of Huonville's residents are of Australian (61.3%) and English (24.7%) ancestry. 7.1% of the population identifies as Aboriginal Australians or Torres Strait Islander, a figure higher than the national average of 3.2%. This trend is common in many regional Tasmanian towns, where Indigenous populations are often more concentrated in rural and regional areas than in major cities.

Nearly half (46.8%) of the population reported no religious affiliation in 2021, while Anglicanism was the most common religion (18.4%). The median age in Huonville was 45 years, significantly higher than the national median of 38, reflecting the older population common in Tasmania’s rural towns.

In 2021, Huonville’s median weekly household income was $1,135, lower than the national median of $1,746, reflecting its rural economy, which is heavily reliant on agriculture, forestry, and aquaculture. These industries tend to offer lower wages compared to urban centres. The town’s unemployment rate was 7.2%, slightly higher than the national average of 6.6%.

Huonville has a higher rate of home ownership compared to larger cities, with more affordable property prices attracting families, retirees, and those seeking a rural lifestyle. Its proximity to Hobart, just 38 km to the north, makes it a popular choice for commuters seeking more affordable living conditions while remaining within reach of the capital city.

== Climate ==
Huonville has a temperate oceanic climate (Köppen: Cfb), with cool, wet winters and mild, dry summers. The average maximum temperature ranges from 22.4 °C (72.3 °F) in February to 11.8 °C (53.2 °F) in July, while the average minimum temperatures range from 9.4 °C (48.9 °F) in summer to 2.0 °C (35.6 °F) in winter.

Huonville receives an annual average rainfall of 744.7 millimetres (29.32 in), which is relatively evenly distributed throughout the year. Extreme temperatures have ranged from 40.4 °C (104.7 °F) in January 2009 to −7.5 °C (18.5 °F) in June 1972.

Climate data for Huonville (42º58'48"S, 147º04'48"E, 63 m AMSL) (1952–2010 normals and extremes)
Month	Jan	Feb	Mar	Apr	May	Jun	Jul	Aug	Sep	Oct	Nov	Dec	Year
Record high °C (°F)	40.4 (104.7)	39.7 (103.5)	37.3 (99.1)	31.7 (89.1)	25.1 (77.2)	21.0 (69.8)	19.7 (67.5)	23.6 (74.5)	28.6 (83.5)	32.2 (90.0)	36.6 (97.9)	37.2 (99.0)	40.4 (104.7)
Mean daily maximum °C (°F)	22.3 (72.1)	22.4 (72.3)	20.5 (68.9)	17.6 (63.7)	14.5 (58.1)	12.1 (53.8)	11.8 (53.2)	13.0 (55.4)	14.9 (58.8)	16.9 (62.4)	18.5 (65.3)	20.3 (68.5)	17.1 (62.7)
Mean daily minimum °C (°F)	9.4 (48.9)	9.4 (48.9)	8.0 (46.4)	6.2 (43.2)	4.3 (39.7)	2.4 (36.3)	2.0 (35.6)	2.7 (36.9)	4.1 (39.4)	5.7 (42.3)	7.1 (44.8)	8.6 (47.5)	5.8 (42.5)
Record low °C (°F)	0.3 (32.5)	−0.6 (30.9)	−1.7 (28.9)	−3.4 (25.9)	−5.5 (22.1)	−7.5 (18.5)	−5.6 (21.9)	−4.6 (23.7)	−5.7 (21.7)	−3.2 (26.2)	−1.8 (28.8)	−1.4 (29.5)	−7.5 (18.5)
Average precipitation mm (inches)	46.6 (1.83)	47.1 (1.85)	48.3 (1.90)	60.7 (2.39)	58.6 (2.31)	61.4 (2.42)	71.9 (2.83)	78.0 (3.07)	74.7 (2.94)	69.1 (2.72)	65.7 (2.59)	62.4 (2.46)	744.7 (29.32)
Average precipitation days (≥ 0.2 mm)	10.3	9.0	10.8	12.8	14.3	14.4	16.3	16.2	16.1	16.0	14.5	12.7	163.4
Average afternoon relative humidity (%)	53	53	56	60	67	71	68	63	59	58	58	56	60
Average dew point °C (°F)	9.6 (49.3)	10.2 (50.4)	9.2 (48.6)	7.9 (46.2)	6.8 (44.2)	5.3 (41.5)	4.7 (40.5)	4.5 (40.1)	5.1 (41.2)	6.4 (43.5)	7.9 (46.2)	8.8 (47.8)	7.2 (45.0)
Mean monthly sunshine hours	238.7	209.1	179.8	144.0	114.7	93.0	111.6	139.5	159.0	198.4	204.0	220.1	2,011.9
Percentage possible sunshine	52	54	47	44	38	34	38	43	45	48	47	46	45
Source: Bureau of Meteorology (1952–2010 normals and extremes)

== Access ==
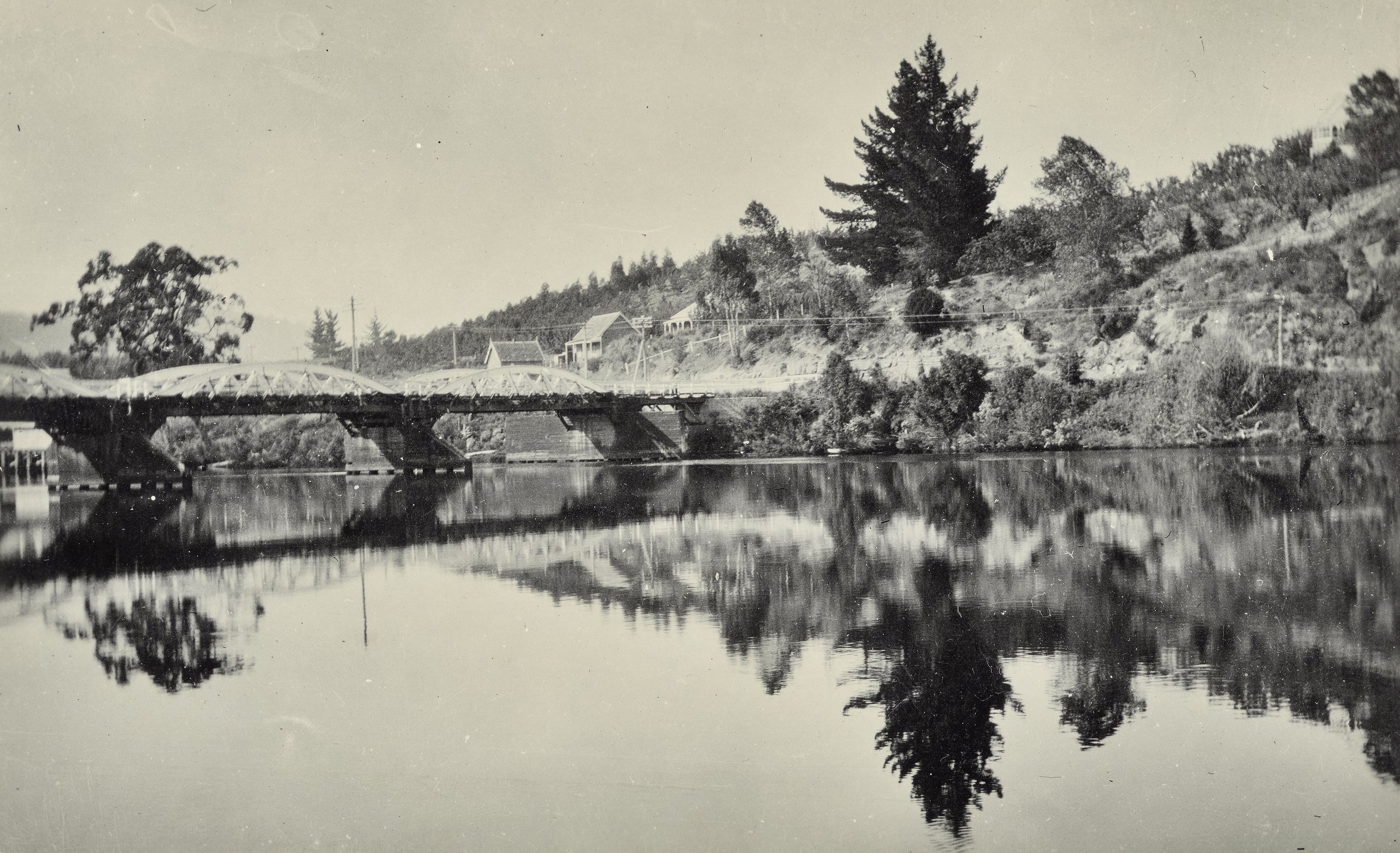
Huonville Bridge in the 1910s

Huonville is located approximately 38 km (24 mi) south of Hobart, accessible via the Huon Highway, which runs through the town and connects it with surrounding settlements including Franklin, Geeveston and Southport.

The Huon River is crossed at Huonville by a steel and concrete bridge completed in 1959. The bridge is the only major road crossing of the river in the area and links the town to western localities such as Judbury and Glen Huon.

Several secondary roads branch from the highway, providing access to towns such as Cygnet and Ranelagh.

Bus services operated by Tassielink Transit and Calows Coaches run between Huonville and Hobart, catering to commuters, students, and visitors.

While cycling infrastructure is limited, the Huon Valley Council has identified active transport as a local priority, with proposals for a shared pathway linking Huonville and Franklin.

Historically, Huonville was a transport point for agricultural goods, especially apples, which were floated down the river to Hobart by barge.

== Notable people ==
=== Arts and culture ===
- Amy Sherwin (1855–1935) – soprano known as "The Tasmanian Nightingale"
- Geoffrey Proud (1946–2022) – artist; winner of the 1990 Archibald Prize and the 1975 Sulman Prize
- Deny King (1909–1991) – naturalist, ornithologist, artist and tin miner

=== Sport ===
- Garry Cowmeadow (b. 1954) – cricketer; represented Tasmania (1976–79) and played in Tasmania's first Sheffield Shield match; also briefly a VFL player with South Melbourne
