= Huon River =

River in Tasmania, Australia

Huon River Taloonne
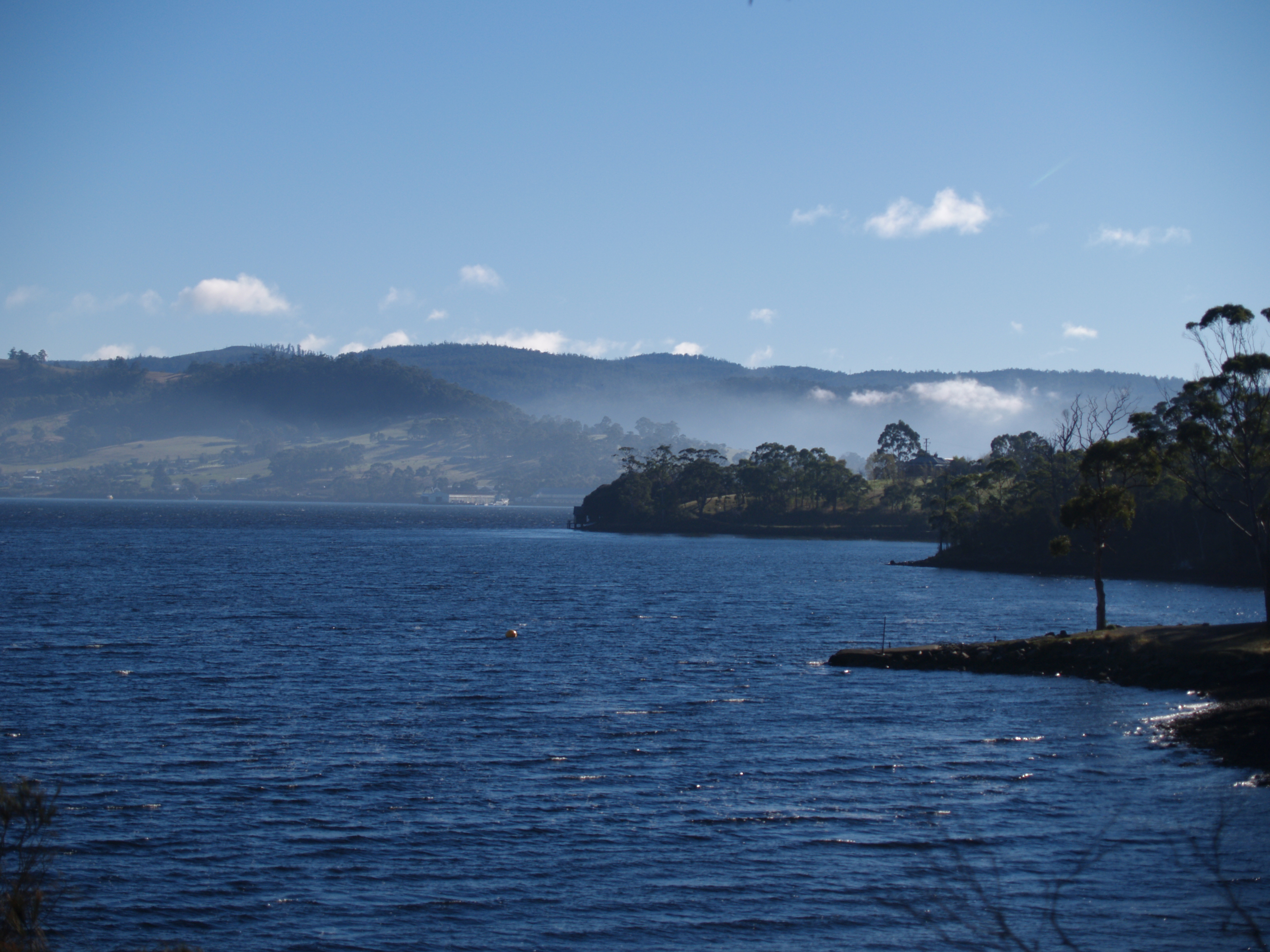
- Lower reaches of the Huon River in winter

- Location of the Huon River mouth in Tasmania
- Etymology: Jean-Michel Huon de Kermadec, a French explorer

Location
- Country: Australia
- State: Tasmania
- Region: South-west, South-east Tasmania
- Cities: Judbury, Ranelagh, Huonville, Franklin, Cygnet (Port Cygnet)

Physical characteristics
- Source: Marsden Range
  - location: Southwest National Park below Junction Hill
  - coordinates: 42°54′S 146°20′E
  - elevation: 578 m (1,896 ft)
- Mouth: D'Entrecasteaux Channel
  - location: Surveyors Bay
  - coordinates: 43°16′52″S 147°6′51″E
- Length: 174 km (108 mi)

Basin features
- Tributaries
  - left: Weld River, Russell River, Little Denison River, Mountain River
  - right: Anne River, Cracroft River, Picton River, Arve River
- National park: Southwest National Park

The Huon River is a perennial river in the south-west and south-east regions of Tasmania, Australia. At 174 kilometres (108 mi) in length, the Huon River is the fifth-longest in the state, with its course flowing east through the fertile Huon Valley and emptying into the D'Entrecasteaux Channel, before flowing into the Tasman Sea.

== Location and features ==
The Huon River rises below Junction Hill in the Southwest National Park with much of its upper catchment drawn from the Marsden Range and associated peaks including Mount Anne, Mount Bowes and Mount Wedge. The river flows generally south through the south-eastern portion of Lake Pedder and is impounded at the Scotts Peak Dam. Thereafter, the river flows generally south-east to the Tahune Airwalk. From its source to mouth, the river is joined by 26 tributaries including the Anne, Cracroft, Picton, Weld, Arve, Russell, Little Denison and Mountain rivers.

After passing through the rural township of Glen Huon the river flows down rapids to merge with the sea water and become tidal. From there it flows through Huonville, Franklin and Cygnet (Port Cygnet). When the river meets its mouth and empties into the D'Entrecasteaux Channel at Surveyors Bay where the river is more than 5 kilometres (3.1 mi) wide. In the lower reaches, the average depth of wide river is 3 metres (9.8 ft) and maximum depth is 12 metres (39 ft).

== Etymology ==
The river is named after the French Navy officer and explorer Jean-Michel Huon de Kermadec.

== See also ==
- List of rivers of Australia § Tasmania
