= Southport, Tasmania =

Southport
- Town
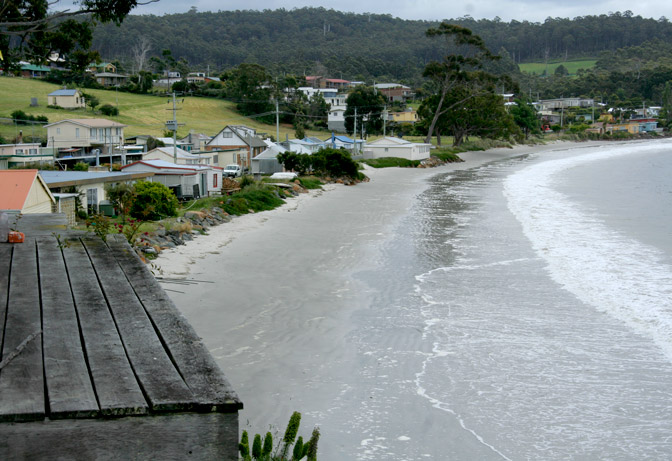
- View of coast of the township

- Coordinates: 43°25′50″S 146°58′30″E
- Country: Australia
- State: Tasmania
- LGA: Huon Valley Council
- Established: 1837

Government
  - State electorate: Franklin
  - Federal division: Franklin

Population
  - Total: 149 (2021 census)
- Postcode: 7109
- Mean max temp: 15.6 °C (60.1 °F)
- Mean min temp: 6.7 °C (44.1 °F)
- Annual rainfall: 984.6 mm (38.76 in)

Southport is a small township in far southern Tasmania; the southernmost township in Australia, Cockle Creek, is located further south, but it is not a gazetted town. The town had a population of 149 in 2021. It was settled in 1837 and grew to be the largest town south of Hobart; but a declining shipping industry slowly led to the town's shrinking population, and much of it has been destroyed by fire. Shore-based whaling took place at Southport in the 19th century.
