= Geeveston =

- Town
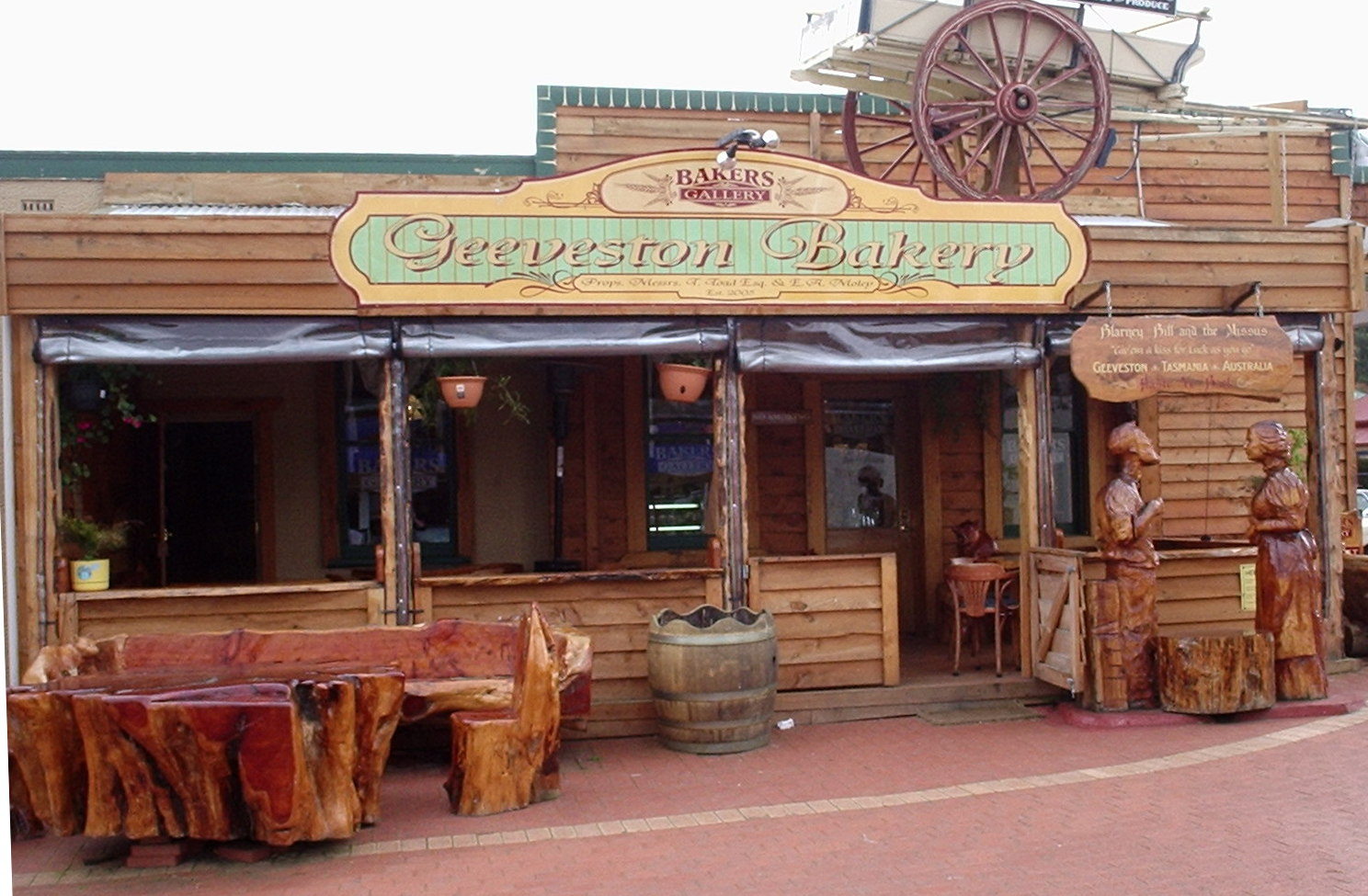
- Old Mill Geeveston Bakery with wood carvings

- Coordinates: 43°10′S 146°56′E
- Country: Australia
- State: Tasmania
- LGA: Huon Valley Council
- Location: 62 km (39 mi) SW of Hobart; 12 km (7.5 mi) W of Cygnet
- Established: 1842

Government
  - State electorate: Franklin
  - Federal division: Franklin

Area
  - Total: 60.2 km^{2} (23.2 sq mi)
- Elevation: 115 m (377 ft)

Population
  - Total: 616 (2016 census)
  - Density: 23.7/km^{2} (61/sq mi)
- Postcode: 7116

Geeveston is a small town in the south of Tasmania in Australia near the Huon River, 62 km (39 mi) south west of Hobart, making it one of Australia's southernmost towns. The town name originates William Geeves, an English settler who was given a land grant by Lady Jane Franklin in the area then known as Lightwood Bottom (after a type of timber prevalent in the area). The settlement Geeves set up was renamed Geeves Town in 1861, and the name eventually became Geeveston. Geeveston is for local government purposes included in the area of the Huon Valley Council and is part of the division of Franklin for both Australian House of Representatives and Tasmanian House of Assembly electoral purposes.

Geeveston is on the Huon Highway, and is the gateway to the Hartz Mountains National Park. It has a large apple and fruit-growing industry, and has also been highly reliant on the timber industry since the late 19th century. A pulp mill was opened in the town in 1962, and was Geeveston's largest employer until the plant closed in 1982. The Geeveston Town Hall Visitor Centre is a tourist and information centre which details the local area and tourist destinations in southern Tasmania, is located in Geeveston. From 2016–2021, the town hosted the filming of the comedy series Rosehaven.

== History ==
Geeves-Town Post Office opened on 1 June 1876 and was renamed Geeveston in 1888.

== Climate ==
Typically for southeastern Tasmania, Geeveston has a pleasant oceanic climate (Köppen Cfb) with typically warm summers and cool winters. Occasionally, very hot air from Central Australia will be driven across the region by anticyclones lying over the Tasman Sea, producing hot to sweltering conditions and extremely dangerous bushfire conditions. The rainfall is substantially heavier than Hobart as Geeveston is less shielded from the moisture-bearing westerlies by Tasmania’s southern mountains: the wettest month in a record from 1971 to 2015 has been October 1988 with 296.6 millimetres or 11.68 inches and the driest January 1999 with 4.8 millimetres or 0.19 inches. The hottest afternoon occurred on 4 January 2013 when the mercury rose to 40 °C or 104 °F, and the coldest morning 19 June 1992 which fell to −5.2 °C or 22.6 °F – 2.3 °C or 4.1 °F less cold than the absolute minimum in Alice Springs 20 degrees closer to the equator.

Climate data for Geeveston Cemetery Road (1971–2015)
Month	Jan	Feb	Mar	Apr	May	Jun	Jul	Aug	Sep	Oct	Nov	Dec	Year
Record high °C (°F)	40.0 (104.0)	36.9 (98.4)	36.8 (98.2)	29.8 (85.6)	25.0 (77.0)	20.6 (69.1)	18.9 (66.0)	23.7 (74.7)	27.7 (81.9)	31.0 (87.8)	34.0 (93.2)	37.0 (98.6)	40.0 (104.0)
Mean daily maximum °C (°F)	21.8 (71.2)	22.1 (71.8)	20.1 (68.2)	17.2 (63.0)	14.6 (58.3)	12.3 (54.1)	12.1 (53.8)	13.0 (55.4)	14.8 (58.6)	16.4 (61.5)	18.3 (64.9)	19.9 (67.8)	16.9 (62.4)
Mean daily minimum °C (°F)	10.0 (50.0)	9.9 (49.8)	8.5 (47.3)	6.3 (43.3)	4.7 (40.5)	2.4 (36.3)	2.2 (36.0)	3.0 (37.4)	4.5 (40.1)	6.0 (42.8)	7.6 (45.7)	8.7 (47.7)	6.1 (43.1)
Record low °C (°F)	0.8 (33.4)	0.1 (32.2)	−1.2 (29.8)	−2.8 (27.0)	−3.7 (25.3)	−5.2 (22.6)	−4.5 (23.9)	−4.4 (24.1)	−4.6 (23.7)	−1.4 (29.5)	0.0 (32.0)	1.0 (33.8)	−5.2 (22.6)
Average rainfall mm (inches)	57.2 (2.25)	49.2 (1.94)	54.7 (2.15)	63.6 (2.50)	73.6 (2.90)	72.4 (2.85)	92.7 (3.65)	104.6 (4.12)	93.1 (3.67)	92.2 (3.63)	69.4 (2.73)	70.5 (2.78)	893.2 (35.17)
Average rainy days	13.2	12.2	14.3	13.5	13.6	11.4	13	14.4	14.7	13.7	16	13.7	163.7
Average relative humidity (%)	73	75	77	78	80	82	80	79	76	74	75	73	77

== See also ==
- Tahune Airwalk
