= Metro Tasmania =

Tasmanian government bus operator

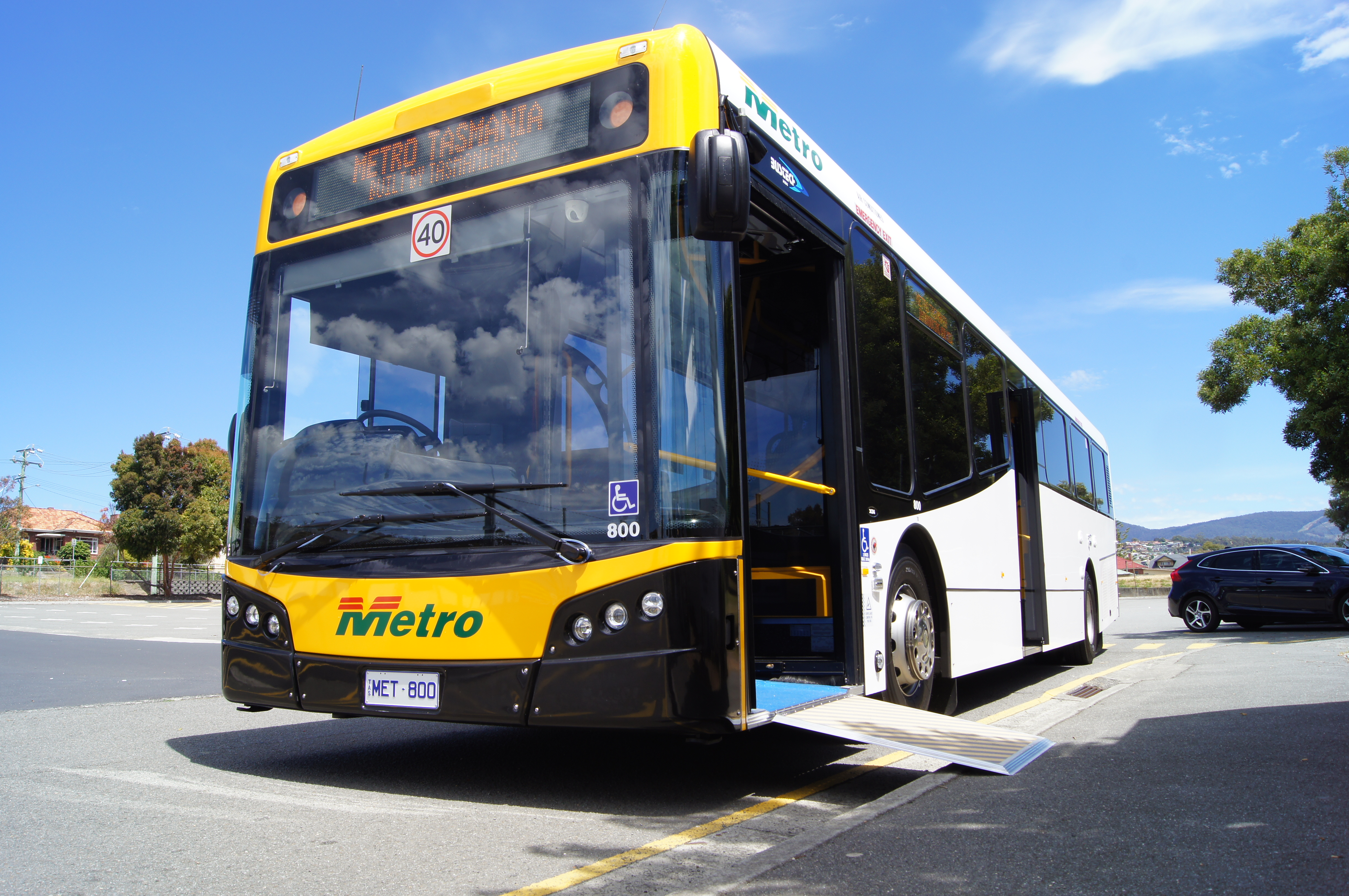
- Metro Bustech XDi in November 2017
- Formerly: Metropolitan Transport Trust
- Parent: Building Tasmania
- Founded: 1 March 1955
- Headquarters: Hobart
- Service area: Burnie; Hobart; Launceston
- Service type: Bus services
- Fleet: 235 (November 2026)
- Annual ridership: 8.93 million (2025/26)
- Chief executive: Jessica Patton
- Website: metrotas.com.au

Metro Tasmania is the largest bus operator in Tasmania, Australia with operations in Hobart, Launceston and Burnie. It is a division of Building Tasmania.

== History ==
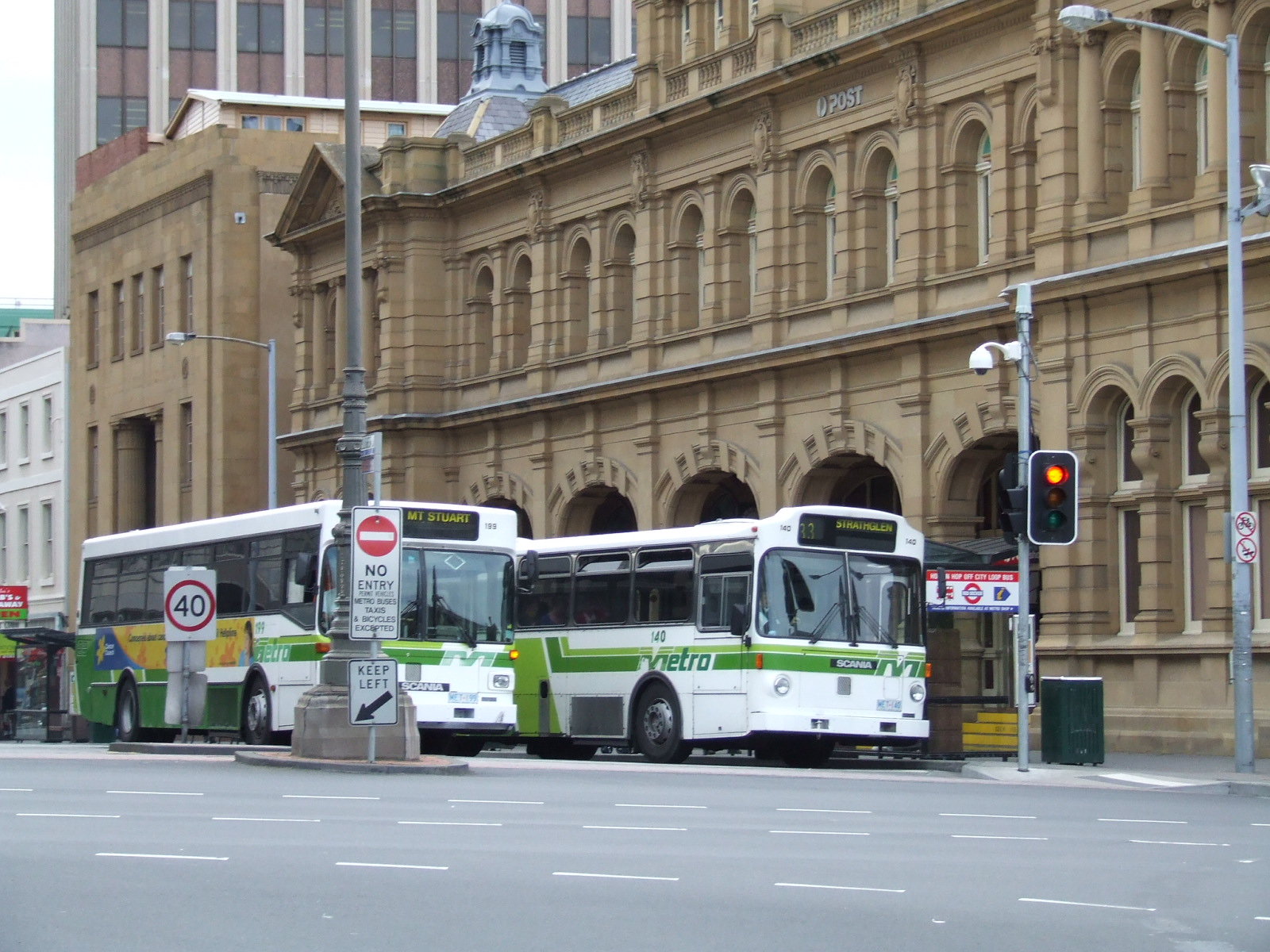
Volgren bodied Scanias in Hobart in January 2005

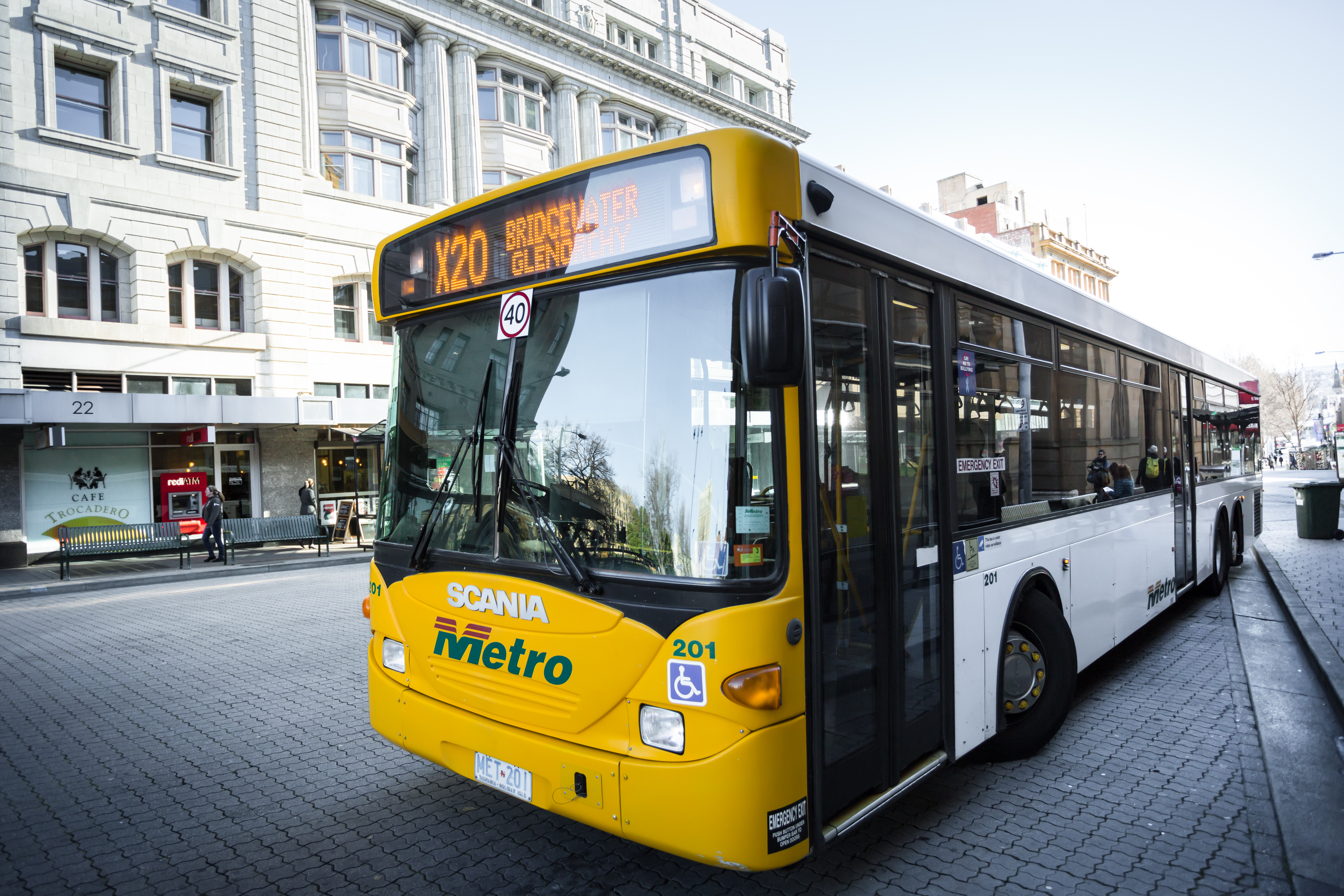
Volgren bodied Scania L94UB in Hobart in August 2017

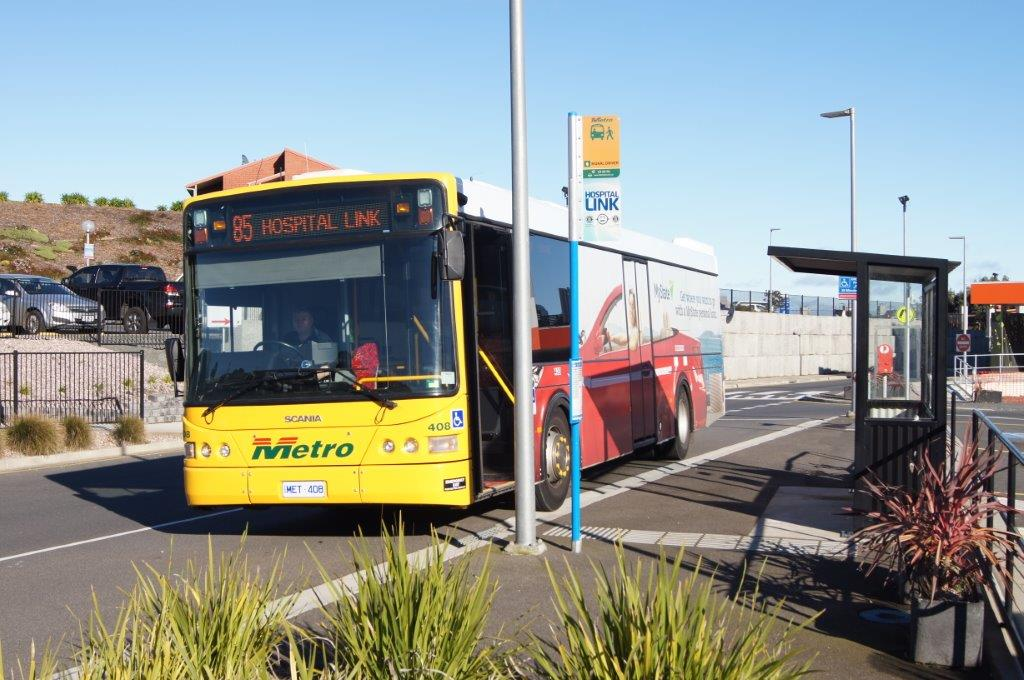
Volgren bodied Scania L94UB in Burnie in April 2021

On 1 March 1955, the Metropolitan Transport Trust (MTT) was formed by the Government of Tasmania to take over the Hobart Municipal Tramways's transport operations. On 1 July 1955, it took over the Launceston Municipal Tramways' transport operations. In December 1955, four services were acquired the from Tasmanian Transport Commission and Gray's Motor Service with 14 buses. On 30 August 1959, the MTT acquired Norton Coaches, Burnie.

On 20 October 1960, the last Hobart tram services ceased, while trolleybus services ceased in Launceston on 26 July 1968 and in Hobart on 24 November 1968.

On 1 July 1974, the MTT took over the Bridgewater and Rokeby services of Tasmanian Coach Lines and Ace Bus Services.

On 30 October 1980, the MTT took over the Hobart services of Northern Suburbs Bus Service. The MTT began using Metro as its operating name during the late 1980s when the trust was a division of the Department of Transport. The MTT was dissolved when Metro Tasmania Pty Ltd became a state-owned company in February 1998.

In May 1999, Metro purchased Hobart Coaches which operated services to New Norfolk, Richmond, Blackmans Bay and the Channel areas of Hobart. Hobart Coaches was retained as the brand name of the regional division of Metro, initially operating with separate drivers and buses at separate yards, however both the workforce and the fleet were gradually absorbed into the main operation.

Services to Kingston and Blackmans Bay became part of Metro's Hobart urban network, with Channel services operated under a separate non-urban contract. Since 1999, some of the former Hobart Coaches routes have been relinquished by Metro either for operational reasons, because contracts were sold to other operators, or due to public transport reviews undertaken by the state government. These include New Norfolk (sold to O'Driscoll Coaches), Richmond (sold to Tassielink Transit) and Cygnet.

== Operations ==
=== Hobart ===
In Hobart, Metro's network extends from Gordon in the southern Channel region, north to Brighton and east to Seven Mile Beach and Opossum Bay with major interchanges in the Hobart, Glenorchy and Rosny Park CBDs and smaller transfer points at Kingston, Howrah, Springfield and Bridgewater. Two high-frequency corridors, branded as Turn Up and Go operate between Glenorchy and Hobart via Main Road, New Town Road and Elizabeth Street, and between Howrah and Hobart via Clarence Street and Rosny Park. On these corridors a service is scheduled to depart every 10 minutes or better in each direction between 7am and 7pm on weekdays.

Hobart's bus routes are numbered according to their geographical area:

- Routes for destinations south of Hobart City are numbered in the 4-- series
- Routes for destinations north of Hobart City are numbered in the 5-- series
- Routes for destinations east of Hobart City are numbered in the 6-- series
- For express variants of routes, the first digit is replaced with an X.
- School bus routes on the western side of the River Derwent are numbered in the 2-- series, and on the east in the 3-- series. For morning services the third digit is odd, in the afternoon it is even.

Cross-town routes that either bypass Hobart City or travel through the CBD without terminating are:

- 500: Glenorchy - Hobart - Southern Outlet - Blackmans Bay
- 501: Glenorchy - Hobart - University)
- 601: Howrah - Rosny Park - Hobart - University
- 605: Howrah - Rosny Park - Glenorchy
- 694: Rosny Park - Risdon Vale - Glenorchy
- 696: Rosny Park - Risdon Vale - Otago/Old Beach - Bridgewater

Some evening and weekend services on the Glenorchy to Hobart Turn Up and Go corridor are operated to/from New Norfolk as route 722 by Kinetic Tasmania as part of a government project aimed at increasing the integration between urban and non-urban services. Since January 2019, non-urban and urban fringe services operated by private companies (Kinetic and Tassielink Transit) from destinations such as the Huon Valley, Sorell, Richmond and New Norfolk have been permitted to pick up and set down passengers travelling wholly within the Hobart urban area.

=== Launceston ===
In Launceston, the Metro network is bounded by the suburbs of Youngtown, St Leonards, Waverley, Rocherlea, North Riverside, Blackstone Heights and Hadspen. The major interchange is located in St John Street in the Launceston CBD. Two high-frequency Turn Up and Go corridors are operated. The first is between the university, Mowbray and the CBD via Invermay Road, and the second is between the CBD and Kings Meadows via the Launceston General Hospital, Wellington Street and Hobart Road.

A new public transport network for Launceston and surrounding regions was introduced on 19 January 2020. This review formed part of the Department of State Growth's program of integrating urban and non-urban bus services, and included both Metro and private operators including Kinetic Tasmania, Manions Coaches and Tassielink Transit. Private operators are now permitted to pick up and set down passengers travelling wholly within the Launceston urban area. As part of a process of reducing duplication of routes and services, Metro withdrew most of its services to North Riverside via West Tamar Road and was replaced by Manions Coaches which now includes North Riverside as part of its Legana routes.

Launceston's routes were re-numbered as part of the review in order to fit into a statewide route numbering system developed by State Growth in conjunction with Metro. The route numbers generally form a pattern according to their geographical area:

- Northern Suburbs: Rocherlea, Alanvale, Mayfield, Mowbray, University (routes 110, 115, 116, 117)
- Eastern Suburbs: Ravenswood, Waverley, St Leonards (routes 120, 121, 122, 130, 131)
- Southern & Central: South Launceston, East Launceston, Punchbowl, Newstead, Norwood, Youngtown, Kings Meadows (routes 110, 140, 141, 142, 145, 146, 147)
- Riverside & Trevallyn: (routes 150, 151, 152)
- Via Westbury Road: Hadspen, Country Club Casino, Blackstone Heights, Prospect (routes 160, 161, 162)
- Via West Launceston: Prospect Vale, Summerhill (routes 165, 167)
- School buses are numbered in the 800 series but do not follow a geographical pattern.

Metro also operates the Tiger Bus service under contract to the Launceston City Council. In the morning and afternoon peaks a commuter shuttle links the CBD with the Inveresk park & ride car park, while during the inter-peak period the bus alternates between three tourist-oriented routes known as the City Explorer, River Explorer and Gorge Explorer.

=== Burnie ===
In Burnie, Metro operates within the urban area from Chasm Creek in the east to Somerset in the west, and within suburban Burnie as far south as Shorewell Park, Downlands, Havenview and Emu Heights. Non-urban services are provided westward to Wynyard, and eastwards to Penguin and Ulverstone. A new network of services developed by the Department of State Growth for Burnie, Devonport and the north-west coast was implemented on 17 January 2021, and introduced Sunday services for the first time to these centres.

== Ticketing ==
Metro uses a smartcard ticketing system known as Greencard, alongside paper receipt-style tickets which are only purchasable with cash on the bus and Hobart-Bellerive Ferry.

Historically, Metro used paper tickets from its foundation until 1987, when a new magnetic-striped system by Crouzet was introduced in Hobart and Launceston, known initially as Metrofare. This system allowed for easier transfers across the network and an exact fare expiration time of 90 minutes. Upon the ending of this system, all ticketing equipment was sold to Adelaide Metro, who were the last remaining company in Australia using the system. Due to its smaller network and patronage, Burnie retained paper tickets and did not use Metrofare.

It was not until 2008 when a new system by Init began trials, using an electronic card to validate and purchase tickets. The Greencard system was introduced statewide during 2010, and allows for passengers to deposit a desired amount onto their cards, with the balance debited upon each trip. The Greencard system also requires validation on each boarding, and has a fare expiration of 90 minutes from the initial boarding. Unlike many other jurisdictions with electronic ticketing, passengers do not tag off at the end of their journey. Each bus has a single Greencard reader and ticket sales point, which is operated by the driver.

Fare types include Adult, Concession/Student and Child, and each are divided into Metro's system of zones based on the distance from the Hobart, Launceston and Burnie CBDs. Fares for non-urban areas such as the Channel, South Arm-Opossum Bay, Wynyard and Ulverstone are set by the Transport Commission.

In 2018, an announcement was made in regards to a new ticketing system slated to replace or upgrade the Greencard system. It will enable the use of debit/credit cards and smart devices to pay fares. In September 2024, a contract was awarded to Cubic. Leveraging off the contract between Cubic and Translink in Queensland, it is scheduled to be rolled out in 2026.

== Fleet ==
The MTT commenced operations with 43 trams, 63 trolleybuses and 17 buses in Hobart, 24 buses and 30 trolleybuses in Launceston and 16 buses in Burnie. The MTT's first purchases were AEC Regal IVs. Bedford SBs were purchased in the 1960s followed by Hino BT51s, Leyland Nationals, Volvo B58s, Volvo B10Ms, Mercedes-Benz OH1316s and Scania N113s followed. More recent purchases have been Bustechs assembled locally by Elphinstone Engineering.

In July 1996, the fleet was reregistered off government GV.1234 number plates to the MET.123 series.

As of July 2026, the fleet comprised 235 buses.

=== Preserved buses ===
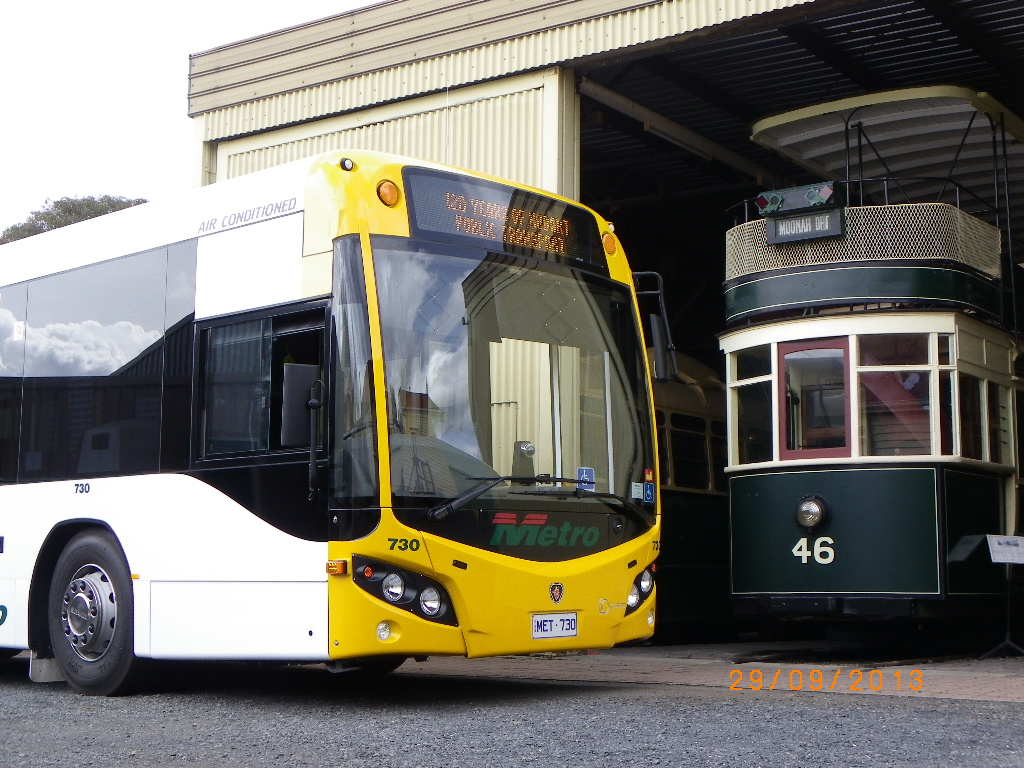
Custom Coaches bodied Scania articulated bus poses with former Hobart tram no.46 at the Tasmanian Transport Museum

Several vehicles once operated by the MTT and Metro have now been preserved by the Tasmanian Transport Museum and the Tasmanian Bus & Coach Society. These include:

- 1942 Canton trolleybus #74 - Donated by MTT in 1964 to Tasmanian Transport Museum, in full operating condition.
- 1948 AEC Regal #16 - Acquired in 1976 by Tasmanian Transport Museum, unrestored.
- 1953 BUT trolleybus #235 - Donated by MTT in 1968 to Tasmanian Transport Museum, last trolleybus to operate in Tasmania
- 1971 Bedford SB3 #249 - Donated by Metro to Tasmanian Transport Museum in 1988, in full operating condition. The last bus built by City Bodyworks Moonah
- 1975 Leyland National #601 - Donated by Metro to Tasmanian Transport Museum in 1992.
- 1980 Volvo B58 #747 - Preserved By Private Owner, being restored to original livery. First articulated bus in full service in Tasmania. Delivered as fleet number 747 (the original MTT articulated buses carried fleet numbers related to Boeing jets to signify their special status), it spent most of its time in the MTT/Metro fleet re-numbered as 702.
- 1989 Scania N113CRB #134 - Donated by Metro to Tasmanian Bus & Coach Society in 2010, in full operational condition. Minor restoration ongoing.
- 1985 Volvo B10ML articulated bus - Donated by Metro to Tasmanian Bus & Coach Society in April 2016, in full operational condition. When donated, was the oldest bus in government service in Australia. Currently being restored to original livery
- 1991 MAN 10.180HOCL "Busy Bee" midibus - Preserved by private owner. Restoration ongoing
- 1992 Scania N113CRB prototype Low Floor #200 - Purchased by Tasmanian Bus & Coach Society in March 2017, courtesy sponsorship from Scania Australia. Full restoration complete.

== Livery ==
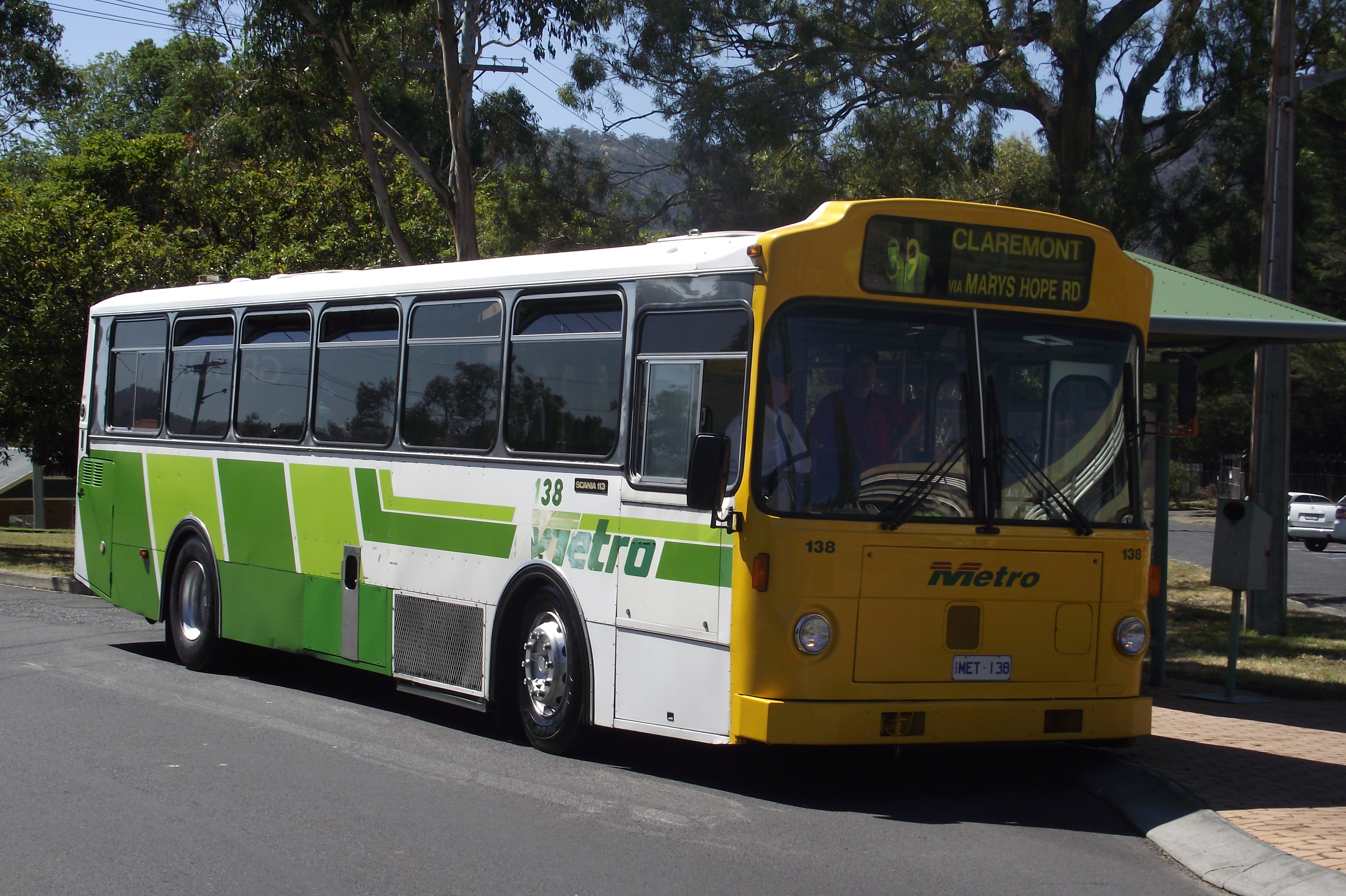
Ansair bodied Scania N113 in April 2021

The initial bus livery adopted in 1955 was the same larch green and cream carried by trams and trolleybuses. In the late 1970s a new livery of rolled gold and cream appeared, which was updated in the early 1980s with a red band below the window line and a stylised MTT logo replacing the traditional monogram. The delivery of the first buses constructed at the new Ansair factory at Kingston during 1987 coincided with a re-branding of the Trust. Although still known as the Metropolitan Transport Trust, the business began to use the name Metro in its daily operations. The new buses were rolled out in a two-tone green livery with Metro titles replacing the stylised MTT logo - at the time the buses operating in the green livery indicated that the vehicle had a passenger-operated rear door. The existing fleet retained the gold and cream through to their retirements, with the exception of the articulated buses which were gradually repainted during the 1990s.

In the early 1990s, new Metro eXpress (MX) services were introduced, and a number of Scania N112 buses and Volvo articulateds were given a livery of green and yellow on white and special MX titles. Newly delivered Scania N113 Oranas commencing with fleet number 606 carried a modified version of this livery. The Metro livery today features a corporate white body with the Metro logo, and all buses are painted with a yellow front to aid with visibility.

Buses have periodically being painted into special liveries. One of the most notable liveries was for the Busy Bee, a high-frequency service that operated for a period from the mid-1990s on the Sandy Bay & University loop in Hobart and to Invermay and Mowbray in Launceston. A number of MAN 10.180 midibuses were painted bright yellow and adorned with a cartoon bee alongside destinations that the buses travelled to. The success of the Sandy Bay service resulted in buses larger than the 30-seat midibuses being required at peak times, and a single Scania Orana was also painted in the livery.
