= Trams in Launceston =

Australian tram network

Launceston tramway network
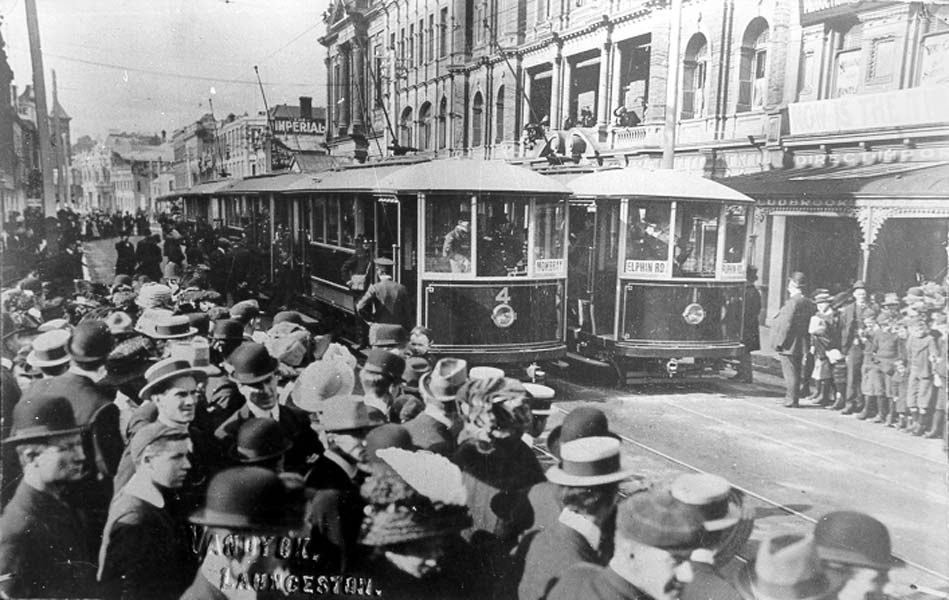
- Launceston trams in 1911

Operation
- Locale: Launceston, Tasmania
- Open: 4 August 1911
- Close: 13 December 1952
- Status: Closed
- Owner: Launceston City Council
- Operator: Launceston Municipal Tramways

Infrastructure
- Track gauge: 1,067 mm (3 ft 6 in)
- Propulsion system: Electricity
- Electrification: Overhead catenary

Statistics
- Track length (total): 13.8 miles (maximum)

The Launceston tramway network served the city of Launceston, Tasmania in Australia from 1911 until 1952.

== History ==
Launceston Municipal Tramways, a subsidiary of the Launceston City Council, began operating on three routes on 4 August 1911 from Brisbane Street in the Launceston central business district to King's Bridge (Cataract Gorge), David Street (Newstead) and McKenzie Street (Mowbray).

Further lines opened to Sandhill (South Launceston) on 27 October 1911, High Street (East Launceston) on 17 January 1914 and Cataract Hill (Hillside Crescent, West Launceston) on 15 May 1915. The King's Bridge line was extended to Trevallyn on 16 July 1912, and the Mowbray line to Racecourse (Mowbray Heights) on 26 January 1916. The King's Wharf line opened on 24 February 1919 to serve Bass Strait steamers. The Sandhill line was extended in 1929 to Carr Villa Cemetery. The Mowbray, Newstead and High Street lines were lengthened 1937, with the network reaching its maximum of 13.8 miles. The King's Wharf line closed in December 1947 when the steamer Taroona began berthing at Beauty Point because of the Tamar River silting. It had only operated on days ships berthed since 1932.

The Trevallyn trams were replaced by diesel buses in March 1947, with the rest of the network gradually replaced by trolleybuses from December 1951. The Newstead line was the last closed on 13 December 1952.

== Rolling stock ==
For the commencement of operations, 14 single-truck trams were bodied locally by J&T Gunn with Brush Electrical Engineering, Loughborough supplying the trucks. By 1927 a further 12 had been delivered. In 1930 three drop centre bogie trams were bodied at the Invermay Road depot.

Single-truck tram number 13 has been preserved by the Tasmanian Transport Museum while bogie tram number 29 is with the Launceston Tramway Museum.

== Depots ==
The original four road depot was located on Invermay Road. After the 1929 Tasmanian floods it was relocated to the corner of Howick and Wellington Streets in 1932. It remains in use as a Metro Tasmania bus depot.

== Preservation ==
Preserved Launceston Trams
Number	Location	Comments
1	Launceston Tramway Museum	Restoration
8	Launceston Tramway Museum	Static Exhibit
11	Tram Bar Launceston	Tram body used as a bar space.
13	Tasmanian Transport Museum	Static Exhibit
14	Owned by Sydney Tramway Museum. Leased to Ballarat Tramway Museum	Static Exhibit
16	Penny Royal Tramway?	Tram used to run at Pennyroyal Mill Tourist Park. Tram has moved to unknown location.
26	Launceston Tramway Museum	Static Exhibit
29	Launceston Tramway Museum	Operational
