= Westwood, Tasmania =

Westwood Tasmania
- Coordinates: 41°29′35″S 146°57′26″E
- Population: 63 (2016 census)
- Postcode(s): 7292
- Location: 26 km (16 mi) SW of Launceston
- LGA(s): Meander Valley
- Region: Launceston
- State electorate(s): Lyons
- Federal division(s): Lyons
Localities around Westwood:
Rosevale	Rosevale, Riverside	Riverside
Hagley, Selbourne	Westwood	Travellers Rest, Blackstone Heights
Hagley	Carrick	Hadspen

Westwood is a rural locality in the local government area of Meander Valley in the Launceston region of Tasmania. It is located about 26 kilometres (16 mi) south-west of the town of Launceston. The 2016 census determined a population of 63 for the state suburb of Westwood.

== History ==
The area was originally known as Summershall. Westwood was gazetted as a locality in 1968.

== Geography ==
The Meander River forms the south-western and southern boundaries, while the South Esk River forms most of the eastern boundary.

== Road infrastructure ==
The C732 route (Bridgenorth Road / Westwood Road) enters from the north and exits to the south-west. The C738 route (a continuation of Westwood Road) starts at an intersection with C732 and runs to the south-east before exiting.
