= Launceston Christian School =

Coordinates: 41.402185°S 147.090345°E

- Launceston, Tasmania; Australia

Information
- Type: Private
- Motto: In Christ, Wisdom and Knowledge
- Religious affiliation: Christian
- Established: 1976
- Principal: Dr Chris Prior
- Staff: 150
- Enrolment: 750
- Colours: Green, maroon & black
- Website: http://www.lcs.tas.edu.au/

1

Launceston Christian School (abbreviated as LCS) is a private, co-educational Christian day school located in Riverside, Launceston, Tasmania, Australia.

Established in 1976, the school provides education from Kindergarten to Year 12 and is operated by an incorporated association. Originally opened with 37 students and two teachers, the school has grown to accommodate more than 750 students. Its educational philosophy is centred on Christian teaching and the integration of a biblical worldview into its academic and pastoral programmes.

== History ==
In 1965, The Association for Christian Parent Controlled Schools (Launceston) was formed by the Reformed Church to establish Christian education in Launceston. Over the next decade, many community members donated towards the purchase of land for the proposed school with the present site finally being purchased in 1973. On the 14th of February 1976, Launceston Christian School officially opened with 37 students across Grades 1 to 5 and 2 teaching staff.

In 1978, the school introduced secondary classes progressively, with Year 10 commencing in 1981. The school subsequently developed into a Kindergarten to Year 12 institution.

The Launceston Christian School Foundation Limited was established in 1991 to support fundraising for school infrastructure and development. In 1994, it funded the construction of a house at Grindelwald, with proceeds from its sale contributing to the Foundation.

In 2011, the Foundation purchased 6.3 hectares adjoining the school's boundary, donating 4.3 hectares to the school the following year for future expansion. Towards the end of 2015, new middle and senior school buildings, an administration building, a new entrance and a senior arts studio were constructed.

== School organisation ==
The school is organised into a junior school (K–6), middle school (7–9) and senior school (10–12). The school's house system formerly consisted of two houses, Zeehan (red) and Heemskirk (green), which were later replaced by three team houses: Barrow (red), Tamar (gold) and Melaleuca (green).

Principals
Year	Name
2026-	Dr Chris Prior
2024	Stuart Kent
Jan 2016 - Feb 2023	Adrian Bosker
Jan 2004 - Dec 2015	Erik Hofsink
1990 - 1993	Alfred Crawford
	Peter Cuthbertson

== Awards ==
Launceston Christian School has a history of achieving strong results in the regional and state competitions of the National Science and Engineering Challenge, winning the Tasmanian state final on multiple occasions and progressing to the national finals as Tasmania's representative. There most recent attendance saw them awarded 3rd spot.

STEM Challenge Tasmania Finals
Year	Place
2026	1st
2025	1st
2024	2nd
2023	1st
2022	1st
2021	1st
2020	Cancelled

STEM Challenge National Finals
Year	Place
2026	3rd
2025	3rd
2024	DNQ
2023	3rd
2022	2nd
2021	Cancelled
2020	Cancelled
