= Esperance Football Association =

- Most recent season or competition: 1967
- Sport: Australian rules football
- Founded: 1922
- Folded: 1967
- No. of teams: 4 (1967), 7 (historical)
- Country: Australia
- Last champion: Dover (1967)

The Esperance Football Association was an Australian rules football competition based in southern Tasmania.

== History ==
The Esperance Football Association was formed in 1922 by the Dover, Raminea and Navvies (Ida Bay) clubs. Prior to the formation of the EFA, football in the Esperance area had mostly consisted of challenge matches against teams from the Huon region owing to the isolation and low population of the area. Records of the early years of the competition are spotty. By 1925 Southport had entered in place of Navvies. Catamaran played one season in 1927, replacing Raminea. Raminea would re-form for the 1929 season, forming a three-club core that would last for much of the competition's existence. The Association was known as the Southport Football Association in 1926, and between 1933 and 1935 was known as the Southern Football Association. Surges Bay joined in 1934 but would only last two seasons, departing after the 1935 season. The EFA entered recess in 1941 due to loss of players to World War II conscription.

The EFA re-formed in 1945 with Dover, Raminea and Southport again the participating clubs. Surges Bay returned to the competition in 1948 but again would only last two seasons before folding. Dover won four premierships in a row from 1946-1949. Glendevie joined the competition in 1952 and won the premiership in their first season. They would go on to dominate the competition over the next 10 years, winning 7 premierships between 1956 and 1963, including 5 in a row from 1956 to 1960.

By the late 1960s the EFA began to struggle as the lack of population in the region stretched the four clubs' ability to fill out their teams. A proposition was put to the Huon Football Association in late 1967 that the four clubs merge to form a combined Esperance team, based at Dover. This was rejected in the summer of 1968, and the EFA folded soon after.

== Clubs ==
=== Final ===
Club	Colours	Nickname	Home Ground	Est.	Years in EFA	Known EFA Senior Premierships		Fate
Club	Colours	Nickname	Home Ground	Est.	Years in EFA	Total	Years	Fate
Dover		Tigers	Dover Football Ground, Dover	1922	1922-1927, 1929, 1932-1951, 1953-1967	11	1932, 1936, 1938, 1946, 1947, 1948, 1949, 1955, 1961, 1966, 1967	Recess in 1952. Folded after 1967 season
Glendevie		Robins	Surges Bay Oval, Surges Bay	1950	1952-1967	8	1952, 1956, 1957, 1958, 1959, 1960, 1962, 1963	Folded after 1967 season
Raminea		Roos	Raminea Football Ground, Raminea	1922	1922-1925, 1929, 1932-1967	4	1939, 1954, 1964, 1965	Folded after 1967 season
Southport		Navies	Southport Football Ground, Southport	1909	1925-1927, 1929, 1932-1940, 1946-1966	4	1940, 1950, 1951, 1953	Folded after 1967 season

=== Former ===
Club	Colours	Nickname	Home Ground	Est.	Years in EFA	Known EFA Senior Premierships		Fate
Club	Colours	Nickname	Home Ground	Est.	Years in EFA	Total	Years	Fate
Catamaran			Located in Catamaran	1927	1927	0	-	Folded after 1927 season
Navvies			Located in Ida Bay	1922	1922	0	-	Folded after 1922 season
Surges Bay			Surges Bay Oval, Surges Bay	1934	1934-1935, 1948-1949	0	-	Recess between 1936-47. Folded after 1949 season

== Premierships ==
Year	Premier	Score	Runners-up	Notes
Esperance Football Association
1922	?			
1923	?			
1924	?			
1925	?			
Southport Football Association
1926	?		?	
Esperance Football Association
1927	?		?	
1928	EFA in recess			
1929	?		?	
1930	EFA in recess			
1931	EFA in recess			
1932	Dover		?	
Southern Football Association
1933	?		?	
1934	?		?	
1935	?		?	
Esperance Football Association
1936	Dover		Southport	
1937	?		?	
1938	Dover	11.18 (84) - 11.7 (73)	Southport	
1939	Raminea	12.9 (81) - 7.13 (54)	Dover	
1940	Southport		Dover	
1941-44	EFA in recess (WWII)			
1945				
1946	Dover	11.21 (87) - 9.9 (63)	Southport	
1947	Dover	15.19 (109) - 8.9 (57)	Southport	
1948	Dover		Southport	
1949	Dover	16.18 (114) - 12.12 (84)	Southport	
1950	Southport	12.18 (90) - 12.15 (87)	Dover	
1951	Southport	7.10 (52) - 7.10 (52)	Dover	Drawn grand final
1951	Southport	14.16 (100) - 12.8 (80)	Dover	Replay
1952	Glendevie		?	
1953	Southport	5.21 (51) - 5.15 (45)	Glendevie	
1954	Raminea	15.14 (104) - 8.9 (57)	Southport	
1955	Dover	13.10 (88) - 11.8 (74)	Glendevie	
1956	Glendevie	15.13 (103) - 13.18 (96)	Dover	
1957	Glendevie	15.14 (104) - 13.8 (86)	Southport	
1958	Glendevie	9.19 (73) - 10.12 (72)	Raminea	
1959	Glendevie	15.7 (97) - 12.23 (95)	Southport	
1960	Glendevie	13.15 (93) - 10.12 (72)	Dover	
1961	Dover	9.22 (76) - 8.12 (60)	Raminea	
1962	Glendevie	10.5 (65) - 9.10 (64)	Dover	
1963	Glendevie	21.20 (146) - 15.18 (108)	Raminea	
1964	Raminea	14.16 (100) - 7.6 (48)	Glendevie	
1965	Raminea	17.12 (114) - 12.7 (79)	Glendevie	
1966	Dover	12.15 (87) - 13.6 (84)	Glendevie	
1967	Dover	9.11 (65) - 7.15 (57)	Glendevie	
