= Travellers Rest, Tasmania =

Travellers Rest
- Suburb
- Coordinates: 41°29′59″S 147°05′56″E
- Country: Australia
- State: Tasmania
- Region: Launceston, Central
- LGA: Meander Valley, Northern Midlands
- Location: 24 km (15 mi) E of Westbury

Government
  - State electorate: Lyons
  - Federal division: Lyons

Population
  - Total: 305 (2016 census)
- Postcode: 7250
Suburbs around Travellers Rest
Westwood	Blackstone Heights	Prospect Vale
Hadspen	Travellers Rest	Prospect Vale
Longford	Longford	Longford

Travellers Rest is a rural/residential locality in the local government areas (LGA) of Meander Valley (98%) and Northern Midlands (2%) in the Launceston and Central LGA regions of Tasmania. The locality is about 24 kilometres (15 mi) east of the town of Westbury. The 2016 census recorded a population of 305 for the state suburb of Travellers Rest. It is a settled semi-rural area at the edge of Greater Launceston.

== History ==
Travellers Rest is a confirmed locality. In the 19th century the area was largely uninhabited. At the junction where the road from Launceston branches — the branches lead now and led then to Longford and Hadspen — a hotel was built in 1833 by G & T Burnett. The hotel was initially called the Travellers Rest Hotel. It burned down in March 1930 due to a hotel employee's accident; he was filling a motorcycle with petrol while holding a lit storm lantern. By 1941 only the front wall remained, a state that led to a call for its demolition. The remaining ruins were finally removed in 1990 when the site was covered by construction of the Bass Highway.

== Geography ==
The South Esk River forms the north-western boundary.

== Road infrastructure ==
National Highway 1 (Bass Highway) runs through from east to west, while Route B54 (Meander Valley Road) runs through from east to west, while Route C531 (Pateena Road) runs from north to south-west.

== Bibliography ==
- Dyer, Alan F (1990). John Dyer, 1809–1882, and his descendants: free immigrant to Van Diemen's Land, Longford Farmer, Hadspen innkeeper, Kentish pioneer. Sheffield, Tasmania: Pioneer. ISBN 0646013939.
