= Community Christian Academy =

Community Christian Academy may refer to:

- Community Christian Academy (Stuart, Florida)
- Former name of Newstead Christian School
