= Summerhill, Tasmania =

Summerhill
- Suburb
- Interactive map of Summerhill
- Coordinates: 41°28′01″S 147°07′47″E
- Country: Australia
- State: Tasmania
- Region: Launceston
- City: Launceston
- LGA: City of Launceston
- Location: 6 km (3.7 mi) S of Launceston

Government
  - State electorates: Bass; Lyons
  - Federal divisions: Bass; Lyons

Population
  - Total: 3,135 (2016 census)
- Postcode: 7250
Suburbs around Summerhill
Riverside	West Launceston	West Launceston
Blackstone Heights	Summerhill	Prospect
Prospect Vale	Prospect Vale	Prospect

Summerhill is a residential locality in the local government areas (LGA) of Launceston (96%) and Meander Valley (4%) in the Launceston LGA region of Tasmania. The locality is about 6 kilometres (3.7 mi) south of the town of Launceston. The 2016 census recorded a population of 3135 for the state suburb of Summerhill. It is a suburb of Launceston.

Summerhill is primarily a residential suburb and is home to Summerdale Primary School.

== History ==
Summerhill was gazetted as a locality in 1963.

The area was officially gazetted as "Summerdale" in 1957, but this appears to have been a mistake, as it had been known as "Summerhill" for up to a century beforehand. A regazzetting in 1963 officially named it "Summerhill". Despite this, the name of the school has not changed.

== Geography ==
The South Esk River forms the north-western boundary.

== Road infrastructure ==
National Route 1 (Midland Highway) passes to the east. From there, several roads provide access to the locality.
