= Gambling in Tasmania =

There have been a number of firsts connected to Tasmania's gambling heritage:

- First lottery in Australia through the Tattersalls company. Today, as the Tatts Group they have an almost monopoly across Australia.
- First and second legal casino in Australia through Wrest Point Casino, and Country Club Casino.
- First poker machines in a casino in Australia.

== Casino legalisation ==
On 14 December 1968, a statewide referendum was held asking voters whether they supported the granting Australia's first casino licence to Wrest Point, conditional on the proposed redevelopment of the hotel. The proposal was approved by with 56% support, and the Wrest Point Casino Licence and Development Act 1968 was subsequently passed by the Tasmanian Parliament.

=== 2018 state election ===
In 2018, the Labor state government under Rebecca White ran with the policy to not renew the licenses. This issue became a major focus of the campaign. Ultimately, Labor lost the election and changed its stance in 2024.
