= Kings Meadows High School =

School in Launceston, Tasmania, Australia

Location
- Guy Street; Kings Meadows, Launceston, Tasmania; Australia; 41°28′24″S 147°09′36″E

Information
- Type: Government comprehensive secondary school
- Established: 1960; 66 years ago
- Status: Open
- School district: Northern
- Educational authority: Department for Education, Children and Young People
- Oversight: Office of Tasmanian Assessment, Standards & Certification
- Principal: Cary Stocks
- Teaching staff: 37.6 FTE (2019)
- Years: 7–12
- Gender: Co-educational
- Enrolment: 540 (2019)
- Campus type: Regional
- Website: kingsmeadowshs.education.tas.edu.au

Kings Meadows High School is a government co-educational comprehensive secondary school located in Kings Meadows, a southern suburb of Launceston, Tasmania, Australia. Established in 1960, the school caters to approximately 550 students from Years 7 to 12. The school is administered by the Department for Education, Children and Young People.

In 2019 student enrolments were 540. The school principal is Cary Stocks.

The school services the Kings Meadows, Youngtown, and Northern Midlands area.

== See also ==
- List of schools in Tasmania
- Education in Tasmania
