= Punchbowl, Tasmania =

Punchbowl
- Suburb
- Interactive map of Punchbowl
- Coordinates: 41°27′25″S 147°9′54″E
- Country: Australia
- State: Tasmania
- Region: Launceston
- City: Launceston
- LGA: City of Launceston
- Location: 4 km (2.5 mi) SE of Launceston

Government
  - State electorate: Bass
  - Federal division: Bass

Population
  - Total: 491 (SAL 2021)
- Postcode: 7249
Suburbs around Punchbowl
| Newstead | Newstead | Newstead |
| South Launceston | Punchbowl | Norwood |
| Kings Meadows | Kings Meadows | Kings Meadows |

Punchbowl is a residential locality in the local government area (LGA) of Launceston in the Launceston LGA region of Tasmania. The locality is about 4 kilometres (2.5 mi) south-east of the town of Launceston. The 2016 census recorded a population of 463 for the state suburb of Punchbowl.

== History ==
Punchbowl was gazetted as a locality in 1963. The name was changed from "Punch Bowl" in 1999.

== Geography ==
Almost all of the boundaries are survey lines.

== Road infrastructure ==
An unnumbered route (Hobart Road) passes to the west. From there, Punchbowl Road provides access to the locality.
