= Blackstone Heights =

- Suburb
- Interactive map of Blackstone Heights
- Coordinates: 41°27′39″S 147°04′28″E
- Country: Australia
- State: Tasmania
- Region: Launceston
- City: Launceston
- LGA: Meander Valley Council
- Location: 34 km (21 mi) E of Westbury

Government
  - State electorate: Bass
  - Federal division: Bass

Population
  - Total: 1,270 (2016 census)
- Postcode: 7250
Suburbs around Blackstone Heights
Riverside	Riverside	Riverside
Riverside	Blackstone Heights	Trevallyn
Travellers Rest	Travellers Rest	Prospect Vale

Blackstone Heights is an outer suburb of Launceston sitting next to the South Esk River.

== Description ==
Blackstone Heights consists of five major roads, (Blackstone Road, Bayview Drive, Kelsy Road, Panorama Road, and Longvista Road) in a loop about 6.5–7 kilometres (4.0–4.3 mi) in total. The loop is connected by Pitcher Parade which originates from near the Country Club Casino and is the only entrance to Blackstone Heights.

== Services ==
Blackstone Heights has a supermarket. There are no schools in the suburb, with the closest schools located in the nearby suburb of Prospect. The suburb is serviced by a local bus service to and from Launceston. There is a Christian church located on Neptune Drive.

== Locality ==
Blackstone Heights is a rural/residential locality in the local government areas (LGA) of Meander Valley (97.5%) and West Tamar (2.5%) in the Launceston LGA region of Tasmania. The 2016 census recorded a population of 1270 for the state suburb of Blackstone Heights.

== Road infrastructure ==
National Route 1 (Bass Highway) passes to the south-east. From there, a series of roads provide access to the locality.
