= Lymington, Tasmania =

Lymington
- Town
- Coordinates: 43°12′05″S 147°03′32″E
- Country: Australia
- State: Tasmania
- Region: South-east
- LGA: Huon Valley
- Location: 25 km (16 mi) S of Huonville

Government
  - State electorate: Franklin
  - Federal division: Franklin

Population
  - Total: 283 (2016 census)
- Postcode: 7109
Localities around Lymington
Wattle Grove	Cygnet	Port Cygnet
Petcheys Bay, Wattle Grove	Lymington	Port Cygnet
Huon River	Huon River estuary	Port Cygnet

Lymington is a rural residential locality in the local government area of Huon Valley in the South-east region of Tasmania. It is located about 25 kilometres (16 mi) south of the town of Huonville. The 2016 census recorded a population of 283 for the state suburb of Lymington.

== History ==
Lymington was gazetted as a locality in 1971. Previously known as Copper Alley Bay, the locality is believed to be named after a borough called Lymington in Hampshire, England, a seaport and yachting centre.

== Geography ==
The shore of the Huon River estuary forms the south-western boundary and Port Cygnet the south-eastern and eastern.

== Road infrastructure ==
The C639 route (Lymington Road / Cygnet Coast Road) enters from the north-east and runs generally south and west along the shore to the south-west, where it exits. Route C646 (Forsters Rivulet Road) starts from an intersection with C639 and runs generally north-west until it exits.
