= Lower Wattle Grove =

- Town
- Coordinates: 43°09′14″S 147°00′46″E
- Country: Australia
- State: Tasmania
- Region: South-east
- LGA: Huon Valley
- Location: 19 km (12 mi) SW of Huonville

Government
  - State electorate: Franklin
  - Federal division: Franklin

Population
  - Total: 89 (2016 census)
- Postcode: 7109
Localities around Lower Wattle Grove
Huon River	Glaziers Bay	Cygnet
Huon River estuary	Lower Wattle Grove	Cygnet
Huon River	Wattle Grove	Wattle Grove, Cygnet

Lower Wattle Grove is a rural locality in the local government area of Huon Valley in the South-east region of Tasmania. It is located about 19 kilometres (12 mi) south-west of the town of Huonville. The 2016 census recorded a population of 89 for the state suburb of Lower Wattle Grove.

== History ==
Lower Wattle Grove was gazetted as a locality in 1971.

== Geography ==
The shore of the Huon River estuary forms the western boundary.

== Road infrastructure ==
The C639 route (Cygnet Coast Road) enters from the north-west and follows the Huon River to the south-west, where it exits. Route C641 (Silver Hill Road) starts at an intersection with C639 in the north-west and runs east through the locality until it exits in the north-east.
