= Wattle Grove, Tasmania =

Wattle Grove
- Town
- Coordinates: 43°10′06″S 147°00′40″E
- Country: Australia
- State: Tasmania
- Region: South-east
- LGA: Huon Valley
- Location: 21 km (13 mi) SW of Huonville

Government
  - State electorate: Franklin
  - Federal division: Franklin

Population
  - Total: 135 (SAL 2021)
- Postcode: 7109
Localities around Wattle Grove
Huon River	Lower Wattle Grove	Cygnet
Huon River estuary	Wattle Grove	Lymington, Cygnet
Huon River	Petcheys Bay	Lymington

Wattle Grove is a rural locality in the local government area of Huon Valley in the South-east region of Tasmania. It is located about 21 kilometres (13 mi) south-west of the town of Huonville.

== History ==
Wattle Grove was gazetted as a locality in 1971.

The 2016 census had a population of 117 for the state suburb of Wattle Grove. At the 2021 census, the population had increased to 135.

== Geography ==
The shore of the Huon River estuary forms the western boundary.

== Road infrastructure ==
The C639 route (Cygnet Coast Road) enters from the north-west and follows the Huon River to the south-west, where it exits. Route C640 (Wattle Grove Road) starts at an intersection with C639 in the west and runs east and north-east through the locality until it exits. Route C646 (Forsters Rivulet Road) starts at an intersection with C640 and runs east until it exits.
