= Vehicle registration plates of Tasmania =

Tasmania Australia vehicle license plates

The Australian state of Tasmania requires its residents to register their motor vehicles and display vehicle registration plates. Current regular issue plates are to the standard Australian dimensions of 372 mm (14.6 in) in length by 134 mm (5.3 in) in height, and use standard Australian serial dies.

== Issuing authorities ==
- Department of Infrastructure, Energy & Resources: 1998–2014
- Department of State Growth: 2014–2026
- Building Tasmania: 2026–present

== General series ==
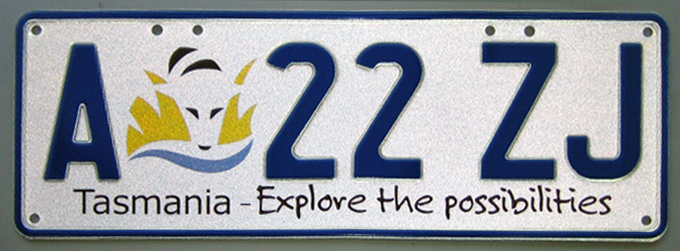
Current Tasmanian registration plate design (2008–present)

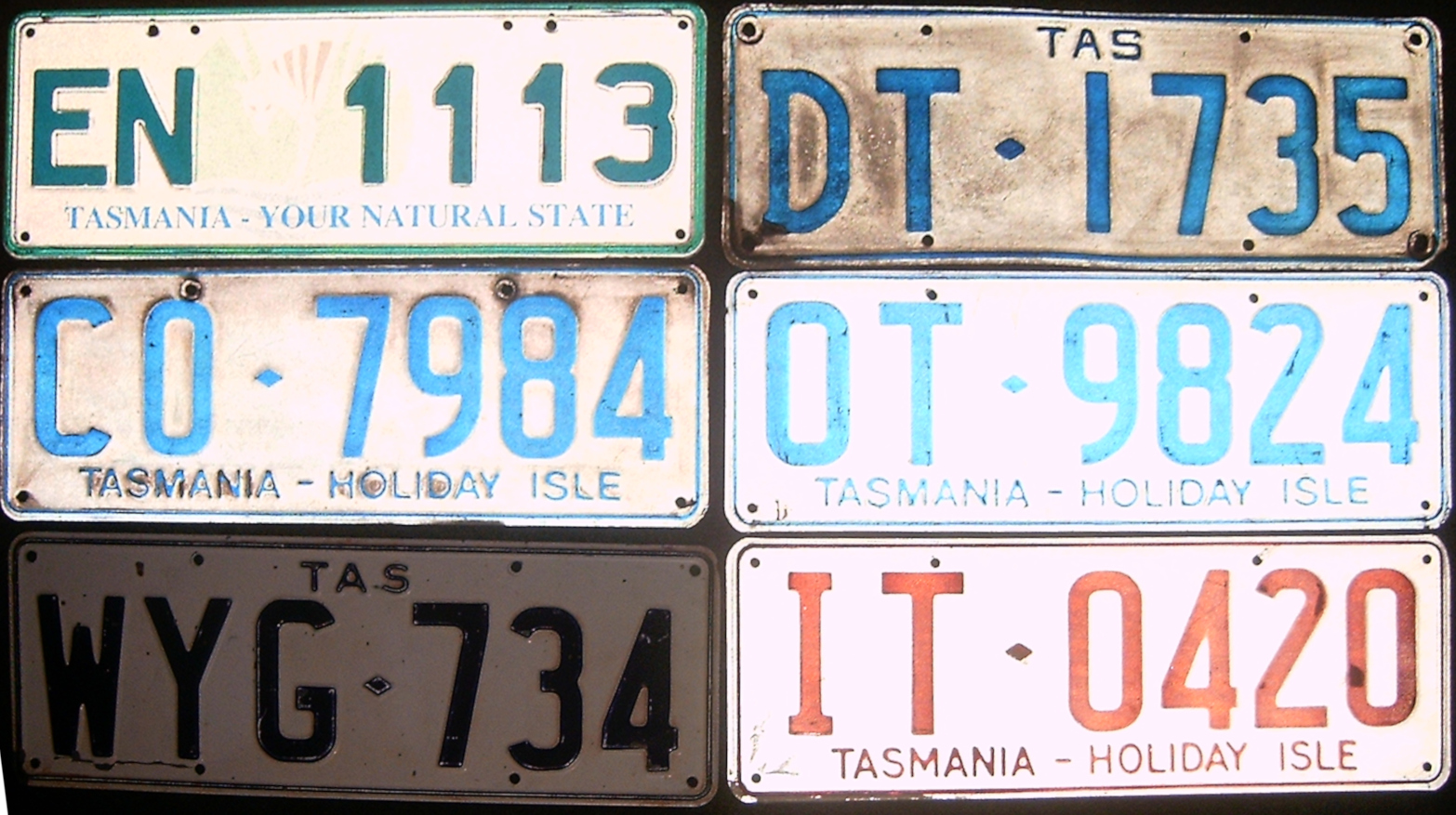
Older Tasmanian registration plates

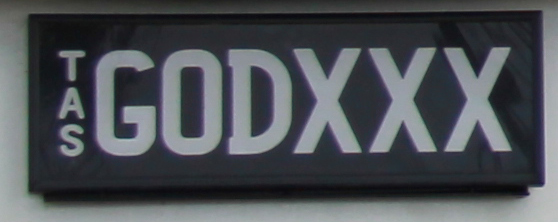
Tasmanian personalised registration plate

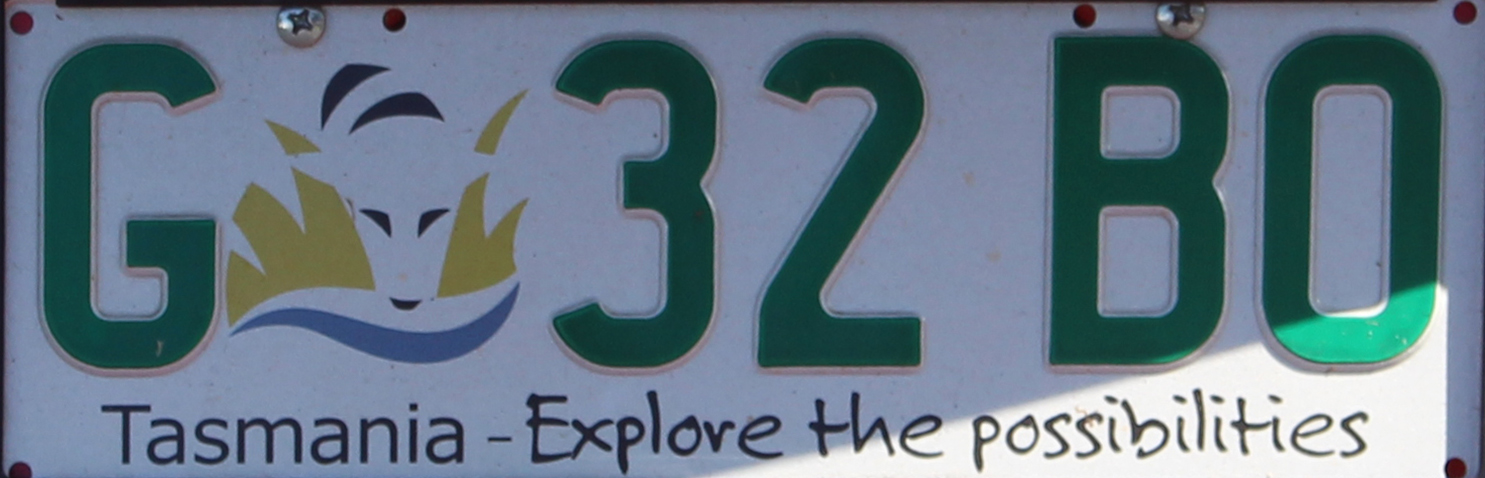
Government of Tasmania registration plate (2008-present)

Between 1930 and 1954, Tasmanian plates were issued in the format, 3 L0000, where the first numeral represented the year, and the letter the month of issue.

In 1954, the style was updated to the W-series plates that ran until 1970, The format and range was WAA·000 to WZZ·999, continuing with the month and year allocations, with the second letter representing the year, and the third letter the month. Originally, from 1954 to 1956, there was a year tab between the state identifier, for example "19 TAS 54" for 1954. This was replaced by a registration label after 1956, resulting in plate design modifications to omit the year between the state identifier.

In 1970, the W-series plates were replaced by the AA·0000 to ZB·9999 series, using just 12 different first letters (one for each month), with blue lettering on a white background. The first letters used, representing the month of registration, were: A for January, C for February, E for March, H for April, J for May, N for June, R for July, S for August, T for September, V for October, X for November and Z for December with the result that plates such as RA-nnnn (Jul) or ZA-nnnn (Dec) were likely to be issued before BA-nnnn (Jan overflow) or DA-nnnn (Feb overflow). In this series, the only second letters used for buses, cars and trucks were A and B. T was used as second letter for trailers, and X as the second letter for motorcycles. From 31 December 1971, this system was abandoned and unused combinations were issued beginning AA-nnnn through to FT-nnnn. From 1970 to 1976 these had the slogan TAS and from 1976 to 1998, Tasmania – Holiday Isle. Between 1998 and 2004, the border colour switched to turquoise with the slogan Tasmania – Your Natural State, with a coloured decal of the Tasmanian state logo in the background (a stylised thylacine prowling through reeds on a riverbank). The update started at DS 0000. In 2004, the series reverted to the original blue borders, while retaining the other 1998 revisions.

On 24 February 2008, the Government of Tasmania issued a new registration plate design in the format A 00 AA. After the first letter appears the Tasmanian state logo with the slogan Tasmania – Explore the possibilities. Tasmanian plates are manufactured by LicenSys in Brisbane.

In August 2017, when the combination F 99 ZZ was reached the G 00 AA to G 99 ZZ was skipped and the next series recommenced from H 00 AA; the G-series is reserved for Tasmanian government vehicles, the Z-series (followed by the Y-series and X-series) is reserved for trailers.

In the illustration of older Tasmanian registration plates, the three plates on the left side from top to bottom are EN-1113 (1998–2004 issue), CO-7984 (1970–1998 issue), WYG-734 (1954-1970 issue, non-reflective). The plates on the right side are domestic or semi-trailer as indicated by the second character "T". The red plate is a Tasmanian interstate plate, issued before the birth of the Federal Interstate Registration Scheme.

== TasPlates range ==
Since 2007, personalised plates are offered only through the TasPlates scheme. A wider range of coloured, prestige and themed plates are available for a one-off fee. Prior to 2007, personalised plates were offered directly through the Department of Infrastructure, Energy and Resources in previous slogan formats and colour options.

AAA-nnn, AAA-nn Motorcycles only AA-nnn

Types of plates offered are:

- Carbon Fibre
- US Style
- Tech
- Chic
- Sports and Leisure
- Tassie
- Cause
- Euro
- Euro Icon
- Prestige
- My colour
- Classic
- Colour on black
- Explorer (November 2018)
- Animals (October 2018)
- Euro Premium (July 2019 and updated December 2021)
- Statement (July 2019)
- Japanese Domestic Market and Leisure (November 2020)

Classic, Colour on black, Tech, Chic, US style, Caron Fibre styles are the same as offered in New South Wales but using different embossing dies.

Bling, graphic plates, fishing, AFL and Camouflage plates offered from 2007 was withdrawn from sale in 2017.

In 2023, seven character plates were introduced.

== Other vehicles ==
Government plates: from 1970, these plates were in the GT-nnnn or GV-nnnn formats, but in the 1990s this was replaced by the G-nnnnn format. Both of these designs featured red lettering with blue or green numbers. With the introduction of the new standard design in 2008, the format G-00-AA is used. The lettering and numbering on the plates is green instead of the standard blue.

Trailer plates: between 1970 and 2008, the format was AT-nnnn to ZT-nnnn, then it went back to issue IT-nnnn (previously allocated to interstate trucks prior to 1987), and QT-nnnn before concluding. This style was replaced in 2008 with the format Z 00 AA; instead of going forwards in combinations, trailer plates went backwards, with Y 00 AA succeeding the Z-series, followed by X 00 AA.

Tasmania Fire Service vehicles use plates in the format TFS-000, with red lettering on a white background and the TFS logo in the centre.

Members of the Consular Corps Tasmania use plates with the letters CC followed by a colour depiction of the flag of the country they represent, followed by two numbers.

Staff of the Commission for the Conservation of Antarctic Marine Living Resources enjoy certain diplomatic status and are issued with plates with the letters IC, followed by one or two numbers.

The Governor of Tasmania official cars are registered and insured, but in keeping with viceregal tradition, they display the St Edward's Crown, rather than registration plates. If the Governor is being conveyed, his or her personal flag will also be flown on the car.

Vintage and classic cars may carry special interest plates, which are black letters on white, of the format SI·nnnA. Registered owners pay a lesser amount, on condition that the cars are not used as regular transport. Since the beginning of 2018, SI series has begun to use suffix letters after reaching SI-9999. Motorcycles use nnn·SI

Metro Tasmania buses have the prefix "MET" on their registration plates, with the number thereafter being the fleet number of the bus. A typical registration plate for Metro bus number 43 would be MET·043.

== Skipped combinations ==
A-12-BC format: All series where the letters I or O occur in 4th position - "a-nn-Ia" and "a-nn-Oa". The G series is reserved for Tasmania Government. Prefix of FPxxxx format: No custom plates beginning with combination of 'FP' in the first and second positions as this series was reserved for Australian Federal Police service vehicles.

== Discontinued plates ==
- Tasplates:

- V8 Supercar plates have been removed from sale effective 22 July 2019.

- Bling, AFL, Original gold and silver lined plates, leisure and floral plates introduced in the 2000s have been withdrawn from sale in September 2017.

- Art range has been cut back to only two options after full range introduction in 2012.

- Interstate trucks: ISW·nnn from 1953 to 1970. Allocated IT·nnnn onwards from 1970 until replaced by the Federal Interstate Registration Scheme in 1987.
