= Petcheys Bay, Tasmania =

Petcheys Bay
- Town
- Coordinates: 43°11′22″S 147°01′21″E
- Country: Australia
- State: Tasmania
- Region: South-east
- LGA: Huon Valley
- Location: 26 km (16 mi) S of Huonville

Government
  - State electorate: Franklin
  - Federal division: Franklin

Population
  - Total: 194 (SAL 2021)
- Postcode: 7109
Localities around Petcheys Bay
Wattle Grove	Wattle Grove	Lymington
Wattle Grove	Petcheys Bay	Lymington
Huon River	Huon River	Lymington

Petcheys Bay is a rural locality in the local government area (LGA) of Huon Valley in the South-east LGA region of Tasmania. The locality is about 26 kilometres (16 mi) south of the town of Huonville. The 2021 census recorded a population of 194 for the locality of Petcheys Bay.

== History ==
Petcheys Bay was gazetted as a locality in 1971. It is believed to be named for William Petchey, an early settler in the area.

== Geography ==
The waters of the Huon River estuary form the southern boundary.

== Road infrastructure ==
Route C639 (Cygnet Coast Road) runs through from south-west to south-east.
