= Brooks Bay, Tasmania =

Brooks Bay
- Town
- Coordinates: 43°14′09″S 147°01′07″E
- Country: Australia
- State: Tasmania
- Region: South-east
- LGA: Huon Valley
- Location: 35 km (22 mi) S of Huonville

Government
  - State electorate: Franklin
  - Federal division: Franklin

Population
  - Total: 28 (2016 census)
- Postcode: 7116
Localities around Brooks Bay
Surges Bay	Surges Bay	Huon River
Glendevie	Brooks Bay	Huon River
Glendevie	Police Point	Police Point

Brooks Bay is a rural locality in the local government area (LGA) of Huon Valley in the South-east LGA region of Tasmania. The locality is about 35 kilometres (22 mi) south of the town of Huonville. The 2016 census recorded a population of 28 for the state suburb of Brooks Bay.

== History ==
Brooks Bay is a confirmed locality.

== Geography ==
The north-eastern boundary follows the shoreline of the Huon River estuary.

== Road infrastructure ==
Route C638 (Esperance Coast Road) runs through from north-east to south-east.
