= Glaziers Bay, Tasmania =

Glaziers Bay
- Town
- Coordinates: 43°08′19″S 147°01′11″E
- Country: Australia
- State: Tasmania
- Region: South-east
- LGA: Huon Valley
- Location: 16 km (9.9 mi) S of Huonville

Government
  - State electorate: Franklin
  - Federal division: Franklin

Population
  - Total: 93 (2016 census)
- Postcode: 7109
Localities around Glaziers Bay
| Huon River | Cradoc | Cradoc |
| Huon River | Glaziers Bay | Cygnet |
| Lower Wattle Grove | Lower Wattle Grove | Cygnet |

Glaziers Bay is a rural locality in the local government area (LGA) of Huon Valley in the South-east LGA region of Tasmania. The locality is about 16 kilometres (9.9 mi) south of the town of Huonville. The 2016 census recorded a population of 93 for the state suburb of Glaziers Bay.

== History ==
Glaziers Bay is a confirmed locality. The name "Glazier" may be a corruption of "Glacier", the surname of an early settler.

== Geography ==
The western boundary follows the shoreline of The Huon River estuary.

== Road infrastructure ==
Route B68 (Channel Highway) passes to the north-east. Route C639 (Cygnet Coast Road) runs through from north-west to south-west.
