= Glendevie, Tasmania =

Glendevie
- Town
- Coordinates: 43°14′42″S 146°59′28″E
- Country: Australia
- State: Tasmania
- Region: South-east
- LGA: Huon Valley
- Location: 33 km (21 mi) SW of Huonville

Government
  - State electorate: Franklin
  - Federal division: Franklin

Population
  - Total: 87 (2021 census)
- Postcode: 7109
Localities around Glendevie
Surges Bay	Surges Bay	Surges Bay
Raminea	Glendevie	Police Point, Brooks Bay
Raminea	Dover	Police Point

Glendevie is a rural locality in the local government area of Huon Valley in the South-east region of Tasmania. It is located about 33 kilometres (21 mi) south-west of the town of Huonville. The 2021 census recorded a population of 87 for the state suburb of Glendevie.

== History ==
Glendevie was gazetted as a locality in 1965.

== Geography ==
Most of the boundaries of the locality are survey lines.

== Road infrastructure ==
The A6 route (Huon Highway) enters from the north-east and runs through to the south-east, where it exits. Route C637 (Police Point Road) starts at an intersection with A6 and runs south-east through the locality until it exits.
