= Police Point, Tasmania =

Police Point
- Town
- Coordinates: 43°15′19″S 147°02′27″E
- Country: Australia
- State: Tasmania
- Region: South-east
- LGA: Huon Valley
- Location: 37 km (23 mi) S of Huonville

Government
  - State electorate: Franklin
  - Federal division: Franklin

Population
  - Total: 83 (2016 census)
- Postcode: 7116
Localities around Police Point
Glendevie	Brooks Bay	Huon River
Glendevie	Police Point	Huon River estuary
Dover	Surveyors Bay	Surveyors Bay

Police Point is a rural locality in the local government area of Huon Valley in the South-east region of Tasmania. It is located about 37 kilometres (23 mi) south of the town of Huonville. The 2016 census recorded a population of 83 for the state suburb of Police Point.

== History ==
Police Point was gazetted as a locality in 1971.

== Geography ==
The shore of the Huon River estuary forms the north-eastern boundary.

== Road infrastructure ==
The C638 route (Esperance Coast Road) enters from the north-east and follows the river to the south-east, where it exits. Route C637 (Police Point Road) starts at an intersection with C638 and runs south-west and north-west through the locality until it exits in the north-west.
