= Surges Bay, Tasmania =

Surges Bay
- Town
- Coordinates: 43°13′33″S 146°59′18″E
- Country: Australia
- State: Tasmania
- Region: South-east
- LGA: Huon Valley
- Location: 31 km (19 mi) SW of Huonville

Government
  - State electorate: Franklin
  - Federal division: Franklin

Population
  - Total: 127 (2016 census)
- Postcode: 7116
Localities around Surges Bay
Geeveston	Waterloo	Huon River
Raminea	Surges Bay	Huon River estuary
Raminea	Brooks Bay, Glendevie	Brooks Bay

Surges Bay is a rural locality and body of water in the local government area of Huon Valley in the South-east region of Tasmania. It is located about 31 kilometres (19 mi) south-west of the town of Huonville. The 2016 census recorded a population of 127 for the state suburb of Surges Bay.

== History ==
Surges Bay was gazetted as a locality in 1965.

== Geography ==
The shore of the Huon River estuary forms the north-eastern boundary. Surges Bay (the body of water) is an inlet of the Huon River estuary.

== Road infrastructure ==
The A6 route (Huon Highway) enters from the north-east and runs through to the south, where it exits. Route C638 (Esperance Coast Road) starts at an intersection with A6 and runs south-east through the locality until it exits in the south-east.
