= Waverley, Tasmania =

Waverley Launceston, Tasmania
- Coordinates: 41°26′04″S 147°11′25″E
- Population: 1,501 (2016 census)
- Postcode(s): 7250
- Location: 5 km (3 mi) E of Launceston
- LGA(s): City of Launceston
- Region: Launceston
- State electorate(s): Bass
- Federal division(s): Bass
Suburbs around Waverley:
Ravenswood	Ravenswood	Nunamara
Newstead	Waverley	Nunamara
St Leonards	St Leonards	Nunamara

Waverley is a rural/residential locality in the local government area (LGA) of Launceston in the Launceston LGA region of Tasmania. The locality is about 5 kilometres (3.1 mi) east of the town of Launceston. The 2016 census recorded a population of 1501 for the state suburb of Waverley. It is a suburb of Launceston.

It is an eastern suburb; the location of Waverley Woollen Mills, and the Waverley primary school.

It is the first suburb to pass through when visiting Launceston from the east coast via the Tasman Highway.

== History ==
Waverley was gazetted as a locality in 1956.

== Geography ==
Almost all of the boundaries are survey lines.

== Road infrastructure ==
Route A3 (Tasman Highway) runs through from south to west.
