= Prospect Vale, Tasmania =

Prospect Vale
- Suburb
- Interactive map of Prospect Vale
- Coordinates: 41°28′31″S 147°07′04″E
- Country: Australia
- State: Tasmania
- Region: Launceston
- City: Launceston
- LGA: Meander Valley Council
- Location: 7 km (4.3 mi) SW of Launceston

Government
  - State electorate: Lyons
  - Federal division: Lyons

Population
  - Total: 5,433 (2021 census)
- Postcode: 7250
Suburbs around Prospect Vale
Blackstone Heights	Summerhill	Summerhill
Travellers Rest	Prospect Vale	Prospect
Longford	Longford	Youngtown

Prospect Vale is a residential and rural locality in the Meander Valley region of Tasmania, Australia, approximately 7 kilometres (4.3 mi) south-west of Launceston.

The 2021 census recorded a population of 5,433 in Prospect Vale.

Prospect Vale has a shopping centre, Prospect Vale Marketplace, containing a Woolworths supermarket. An industrial park is also located within the suburb. Sporting grounds include Prospect Vale Park.

== History ==
Prospect Vale was gazetted as a locality in 1963.

The land was used by European settlers for cattle grazing and horse studs. The area was previously part of the neighbouring suburb of Prospect, which was proclaimed in 1958. Prospect Primary School was the area's first school. This school is now known as Summerdale Primary School, and is in the suburb of Summerhill.

St Patrick's College moved to its current site in the late 1950s. The Rising Sun Hotel, a two-storey building with 12 rooms, previously stood on the site. The current school buildings were constructed c. 1961 to accommodate approximately 400 students.

Molecombe Cottage, located on Molecombe Drive, is one of the area's older properties. It is permanently listed on the Tasmanian Heritage Register (entry 4838). A Meander Valley Council report identified it as the only property listed on the register within the Prospect Vale and Blackstone Heights planning area.

Further residential subdivisions were developed during the 1990s.

== Geography ==
Prospect Vale is located south-west of Launceston and borders Prospect, Summerhill, Blackstone Heights and Travellers Rest.

Much of Prospect Vale is relatively flat or gently sloping, at around 180 metres above sea level. The nearby Blackstone Hills rise to approximately 260–300 metres above sea level. East of Westbury Road, the land slopes towards a stream running through Kate Reed Reserve, which drains into Kings Meadow Rivulet.

Dolerite is common throughout the area. Clay, silt and sand are also found in eastern Prospect Vale, along Meander Valley Road and near some streams.

== Transport ==
Westbury Road (B54) is the principal road through Prospect Vale, providing connections to central Launceston and surrounding suburbs. The Bass Highway (National Highway) runs along part of the suburbs southern boundary, providing regional connections towards Devonport and north-western Tasmania. Meander Valley Road also provides access towards Hadspen and the surrounding Meander Valley region.

Public transport is provided by Metro Tasmania, with bus routes 160, 161, 162, 165 and 167 connecting Prospect Vale and surrounding suburbs with central Launceston.

Walking and cycling connections were part of the Meander Valley Council 2026–2046 structure planning process. The Pathway Network Plan in the report identified opportunities to improve links between residential neighbourhoods, commercial centres, schools and recreational facilities. Westbury Road was identified as a potential cycling route, although further investigation was required given its limited road width and use by heavy freight vehicles.

== Demographics ==
The 2001 census recorded 4,318 people in Prospect Vale on census night. The population based on residence was 4,629 at the 2006 census, 5,021 at the 2011 census, 5,067 at the 2016 census and 5,433 at the 2021 census. Between 2011 and 2021, the recorded median age rose from 42 to 48 years, while the proportion of residents aged 65 years and over increased from 20.1% to 27.6%.

Population
Characteristic	2001	2006	2011	2016	2021
Total population	4,318	4,629	5,021	5,067	5,433
By sex
Female	2,292 (53.1%)	2,494 (53.9%)	2,684 (53.5%)	2,725 (53.8%)	2,898 (53.4%)
Male	2,026 (46.9%)	2,135 (46.1%)	2,337 (46.5%)	2,344 (46.2%)	2,527 (46.6%)
By age group
0–4 years	320 (7.4%)	259 (5.6%)	275 (5.5%)	276 (5.5%)	227 (4.2%)
5–14 years	603 (14.0%)	643 (13.9%)	587 (11.7%)	524 (10.3%)	565 (10.4%)
15–24 years	482 (11.2%)	506 (10.9%)	635 (12.6%)	591 (11.7%)	547 (10.1%)
25–54 years	1,887 (43.7%)	1,895 (40.9%)	1,873 (37.3%)	1,823 (36.0%)	1,869 (34.4%)
55–64 years	371 (8.6%)	490 (10.6%)	640 (12.7%)	635 (12.5%)	726 (13.4%)
65 years and over	652 (15.1%)	834 (18.0%)	1,009 (20.1%)	1,212 (23.9%)	1,497 (27.6%)
Median age	35 years	40 years	42 years	45 years	48 years

=== Aboriginal and Torres Strait Islander people ===
The number of people identifying as Aboriginal and/or Torres Strait Islander in Prospect Vale was 68 (1.6% of the counted population) in 2001 and 162 (3.0%) in 2021.

Aboriginal and/or Torres Strait Islander identification
Census	Persons	Share of population	Change since previous census
2001	68	1.6%	—
2006	96	2.1%	+28
2011	125	2.5%	+29
2016	127	2.5%	+2
2021	162	3.0%	+35

=== Country of birth ===
In the 2021 census, Australia was the most frequently reported country of birth, followed by the United Kingdom when its constituent countries are combined. The table lists Australia and the ten largest identifiable overseas birthplaces in 2021, with corresponding counts from earlier censuses where available. The 2016 and 2021 United Kingdom totals combine England, Scotland, Wales and Northern Ireland; earlier profiles report the United Kingdom as a single category.

Country of birth (Australia and ten leading overseas birthplaces in 2021)
Country	2001	2006	2011	2016	2021	2021 share
Australia	3,681	3,929	4,372	4,269	4,551	83.8%
United Kingdom (combined)	179	201	205	191	195	3.6%
India	9	11	11	25	36	0.7%
Philippines	5	8	14	22	33	0.6%
New Zealand	18	32	39	34	32	0.6%
Netherlands	31	32	32	24	28	0.5%
China	0	0	3	13	26	0.5%
Nepal	—	—	—	0	21	0.4%
South Africa	10	11	7	15	18	0.3%
Italy	32	30	30	21	17	0.3%
Sri Lanka	6	10	17	8	17	0.3%

The largest recorded changes among these selected overseas birthplaces were as follows. The figures measure differences in census counts, not necessarily migration into or out of Prospect Vale.

Largest recorded changes among selected overseas birthplaces
Period	Largest increases	Largest decreases
2001–06	United Kingdom (+22); New Zealand (+14)	Italy (−2)
2006–11	New Zealand (+7); Sri Lanka (+7)	South Africa (−4)
2011–16	India (+14); China (+10)	United Kingdom (−14); Italy and Sri Lanka (−9 each)
2016–21	Nepal (+21); China (+13)	Italy (−4); New Zealand (−2)

=== Dwellings ===
The number of occupied private dwellings reported increased from 2,022 in 2011 to 2,345 in 2021. Separate houses remained the highest dwelling type, accounting for 79.7% of occupied private dwellings in 2021.

Dwellings
Characteristic	2001	2006	2011	2016	2021
All private dwellings	1,867	—	2,268	2,331	2,536
Occupied private dwellings	1,748	1,838	2,022	2,033	2,345
By dwelling type
Separate house	1,482 (84.8%)	1,452 (79.0%)	1,636 (80.9%)	1,623 (79.8%)	1,868 (79.7%)
Semi-detached, terrace or townhouse	229 (13.1%)	215 (11.7%)	217 (10.7%)	120 (5.9%)	147 (6.3%)
Flat or apartment	34 (1.9%)	171 (9.3%)	170 (8.4%)	287 (14.1%)	325 (13.9%)
By ownership and tenure
Owned outright	672 (38.4%)	700 (38.1%)	776 (38.4%)	768 (37.8%)	957 (40.8%)
Owned with a mortgage	564 (32.3%)	637 (34.7%)	697 (34.5%)	672 (33.1%)	732 (31.2%)
Rented	428 (24.5%)	433 (23.6%)	496 (24.5%)	526 (25.9%)	609 (26.0%)
Other tenure type	33 (1.9%)	4 (0.2%)	10 (0.5%)	8 (0.4%)	21 (0.9%)
Tenure not stated	62 (3.5%)	63 (3.4%)	44 (2.2%)	56 (2.8%)	33 (1.4%)

Notes: Percentages in brackets in the population and housing tables show the percentage of people or occupied private homes recorded in each census. Country of birth percentages are based on the total 2021 population. Some age groups have been combined from the original Australian Bureau of Statistics (ABS) figures.

The 2001 population figures count people who were in Prospect Vale on census night, while figures from 2006 onwards count people who lived there.

A dash means a figure was either not published separately or could not be confirmed, rather than being zero. The table showing the largest changes in country of birth only covers the countries listed, rather than every country. Changes to the ABS housing categories in 2021 also affect comparisons of rented and other housing arrangements.

The ABS makes small random adjustments to census figures to protect people's privacy, meaning totals can sometimes differ slightly. For example, the 2011 Basic Community Profile records 125 Aboriginal and/or Torres Strait Islander people, while the 2011 QuickStats records 124. Changes in these population figures have not been adjusted for changes in the census area.

== Local government and electoral boundaries ==
Prospect Vale is part of the Meander Valley Council local government area. The council was established in 1993 through the amalgamation of the former Westbury and Deloraine municipalities.

The suburb was previously part of the federal Division of Bass before being transferred to the Division of Lyons following Tasmania's 2017 federal electoral redistribution. The new boundaries were first used at the 2019 federal election. The redistribution placed the whole of the Meander Valley municipality within Lyons, despite objections regarding the connection between its suburban areas and Greater Launceston.

During the 2026 federal electoral redistribution, the Australian Electoral Commission proposed returning Prospect Vale and neighbouring Blackstone Heights to Bass, citing their connections with Launceston. The proposal was later revised, with both localities remaining in Lyons

== Bibliography ==
- Westbury Municipal Council (1963). Westbury Municipal centenary 1863-1963. Launceston: Telegraph Printery.
