= St Leonards, Tasmania =

St Leonards Launceston, Tasmania
- Coordinates: 41°27′30″S 147°12′3″E
- Population: 2,009 (2016 census)
- Postcode(s): 7250
- Location: 5.7 km (4 mi) from Launceston
- LGA(s): Launceston
- Region: Launceston
- State electorate(s): Bass
- Federal division(s): Bass
Suburbs around St Leonards:
Newstead	Waverley	Nunamara
Norwood	St Leonards	Nunamara
Norwood	White Hills	White Hills

St Leonards is a semi-rural residential locality in the local government area of Launceston in the Launceston region of Tasmania. It is an eastern suburb of Launceston, with a mix of residential, semi-rural and rural homes. It has schools and shops, and it is a ten-minute drive to the city. It is an alternative to city living. The 2016 census determined a population of 2009 for the state suburb of St Leonards.

== History ==
St Leonards was gazetted as a locality in 1963.

== Geography ==
The North Esk River forms the southern boundary and almost all of the western boundary.

== Road infrastructure ==
The Tasman Highway (A3) passes through a small section of the north-west of the locality, and subsequently also passes through the north-east corner. The C401 route (St Leonards Road) starts at an intersection with A3 in the north-west corner and runs south-east through the locality and town before exiting in the south-west. The C403 route is in two sections within the locality, both starting / ending in the town. The western section (Johnston Road) starts at an intersection with C401 and runs south-west before exiting. The eastern section (Abels Hill Road) starts at an intersection with C401 and runs north-east before ending at an intersection with the A3.
