= Newstead Christian School =

Location
- Newstead, Tasmania; Australia; 41.43818°S 147.16514°E; 41.43697°S 147.17337°E

Information
- Type: Christian, private school, day
- Motto: Equipped, Empowered to Serve
- Established: 1995
- Principal: Diane Hooley
- Colours: white, grey, black and maroon
- Website: http://www.ncs.tas.edu.au/

Newstead Christian School is a K–10 Christian school outside Launceston, Tasmania.
