= Prospect, Tasmania =

Prospect
- Suburb
- Interactive map of Prospect
- Coordinates: 41°28′14″S 147°08′02″E
- Country: Australia
- State: Tasmania
- Region: Launceston
- City: Launceston
- LGA: City of Launceston
- Location: 8 km (5.0 mi) S of Launceston

Government
  - State electorate: Bass
  - Federal division: Bass

Population
  - Total: 1,722 (2016 census)
- Postcode: 7250
Suburbs around Prospect
Summerhill	West Launceston	South Launceston
Prospect Vale	Prospect	Kings Meadows
Prospect Vale	Youngtown	Youngtown

Prospect is a residential locality in the local government area (LGA) of Launceston in the Launceston LGA region of Tasmania. The locality is about 8 kilometres (5.0 mi) south of the town of Launceston. The 2016 census recorded a population of 1722 for the state suburb of Prospect. It is a suburb of Launceston.

The Mount Pleasant Laboratories are Tasmanian government laboratories located in Prospect and include:

- Diagnostic Services - Researching the Tasmanian devil facial tumour disease
- Animal Health Laboratory
- Water Microbiology Laboratory
- Veterinary Pathology and Fish Microbiology
- Seed Laboratory and Certification

A sawmill, stonemason, Tasmanian Independent Retailers state distribution centre dominate the area. There are a number of restaurants and shops along Westbury Road - Prospect's main commercial corridor - including IGA. The Silverdome Complex is a multi use facility incorporating an indoor cycling track, netball courts and concert seating. The home of the Tasmanian Institute of Sport offices.

== History ==
Prospect was gazetted as a locality in 1963.

== Geography ==
The Midland Highway forms most of the eastern boundary.

== Road infrastructure ==
Westbury Road goes through the suburb centre of Prospect which there are currently remaining roundabout signs with the National Highway 1 label on it which is signage for the Bass Highway since the Bass Highway used to go through the suburb centre of Prospect. The Midland Highway runs through the north-east corner, and the Bass Highway runs through to the west.

== Sport and recreation ==
St Patrick's College, on Westbury Road, has Australian rules football and soccer grounds, gymnasiums, tennis and netball courts, and an indoor swimming pool. The John Cunningham Memorial Oval is used by the St Patrick's Old Collegians Football Club, which was established in 1931.

In July 2026, St Patrick's Old Collegians was considering playing most of its home games at Prospect Vale Park from 2028, when the club is due to enter the NTFA Premier League. The club intended to keep John Cunningham Memorial Oval as its traditional home and training ground. The proposed move would require agreement from Meander Valley Council.
