= Youngtown, Tasmania =

Suburb of Launceston, Tasmania

Youngtown
- Suburb
- Interactive map of Youngtown
- Country: Australia
- State: Tasmania
- Region: Launceston, Central
- City: Launceston
- LGA: Launceston, Northern Midlands
- Location: 6 km (3.7 mi) S of Launceston

Government
  - State electorate: Bass, Lyons
  - Federal division: Bass, Lyons

Population
  - Total: 4,053 (2016 census)
- Postcode: 7249
Suburbs around Youngtown
Prospect	Kings Meadows	Norwood
Prospect Vale	Youngtown	St Leonards
Breadalbane	Relbia	Relbia

Youngtown is a residential locality in the local government areas (LGA) of Launceston and Northern Midlands in the Launceston and Central LGA regions of Tasmania. The locality is about 6 kilometres (3.7 mi) south-east of the town of Launceston. The 2016 census has a population of 291 for the state suburb of Youngtown. It is a southern suburb of Launceston.

There is an Australian rules football ground at Youngtown, the Youngtown Oval, which is where South Launceston Football Club play their home games in the Tasmania State League. Youngtown Primary School is also located in the suburb.

== Suburb description ==
The suburb has many shops and businesses such as the Youngtown IGA, City Mission and other various shops. The suburbs boundary is followed with Kings Meadows Link, the Midland Highway and houses.

== History ==
Youngtown was gazetted as a locality in 1963.

Youngtown is also where the minor locality of Franklin Village is located which was established in 1837. Most of the historic buildings of Franklin Village are gone, and the area is incorporated into nearby Youngtown. The remaining buildings include Franklin House which was built in 1838 and St James Anglican Church built 1845.

The suburb was named after Henry Young, the first governor of Tasmania.

== Geography ==
The Midland Highway (National Highway 1) forms the south-western boundary, and the Western Railway Line much of the eastern.

== Road infrastructure ==
Route C402 (Hobart Road) passes through from north to south. Route C411 (Relbia Road) starts at an intersection with C402 and immediately exits to the south-east.
