= Riverside, Tasmania =

Riverside
- Suburb
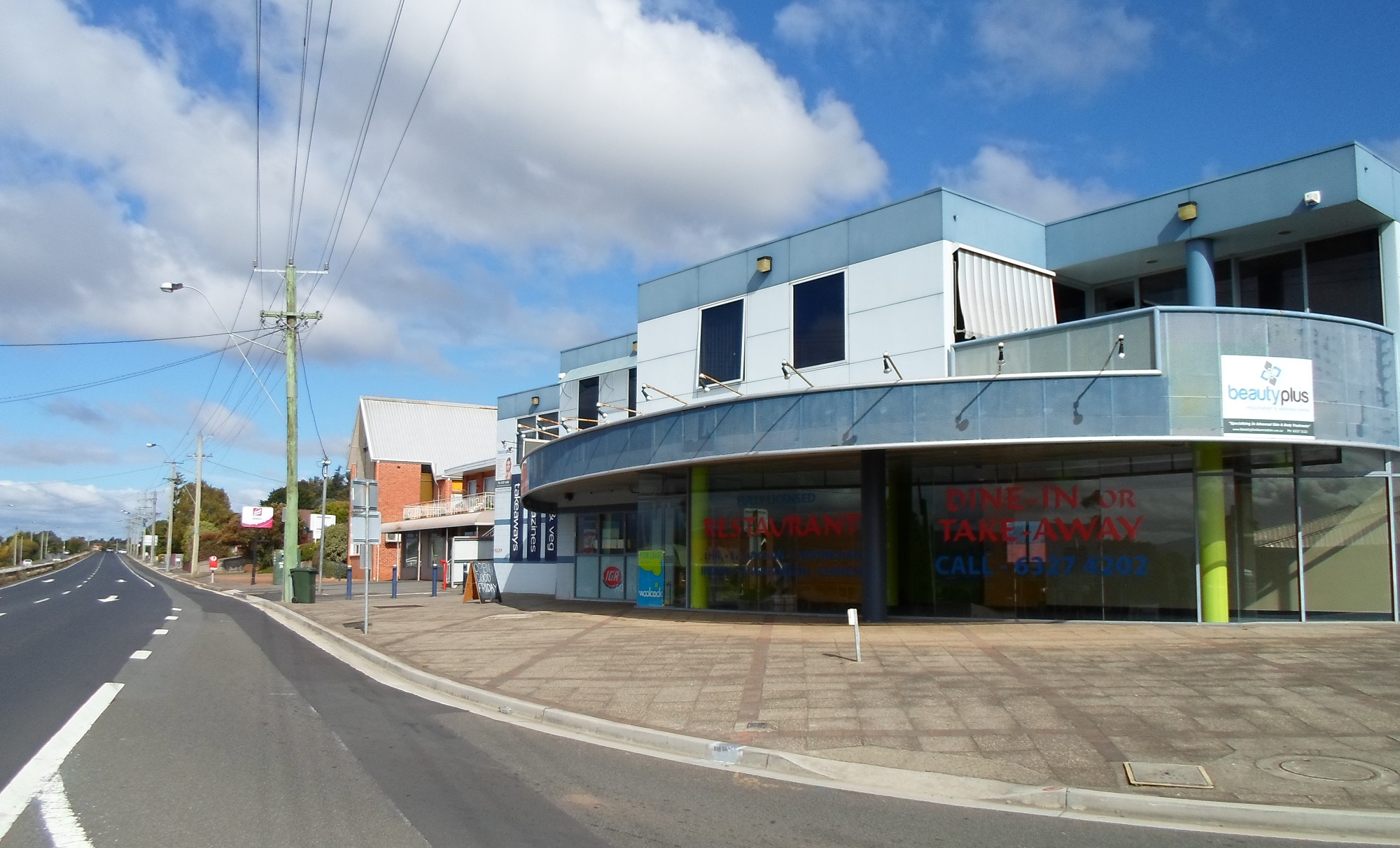
- Commercial buildings and St David's Church on the corner of Ecclestone Road, Riverside

- Interactive map of Riverside
- Coordinates: 41°25′12″S 147°06′11″E
- Country: Australia
- State: Tasmania
- Region: Launceston
- City: Launceston
- LGA: Meander Valley, West Tamar
- Location: 5 km (3.1 mi) NW of Launceston, Tasmania; 39 km (24 mi) SE of Beaconsfield

Government
  - State electorate: Lyons, Bass
  - Federal division: Lyons, Bass

Population
  - Total: 6,472 (2016 census)
- Postcode: 7250
Suburbs around Riverside
Bridgenorth	Legana	Tamar River
Rosevale, Westwood	Riverside	Tamar River
Westwood	Blackstone Heights	Trevallyn

Riverside is a rural and urban locality in the local government areas of Meander Valley and West Tamar in the Launceston region of Tasmania, Australia. The locality is about 39 kilometres (24 mi) south-east of the town of Beaconsfield. The 2016 census recorded a population of 6472 for the state suburb of Riverside. It is a residential suburb 5 kilometres (2.5 mi) north-west of the central business district of Launceston, Tasmania's second largest city. The West Tamar Highway runs through the suburb, adjoining Riverside to the West Tamar, which includes small towns such as Beaconsfield, and Beauty Point. Riverside is part of the West Tamar Council local government area. The suburb is now Launceston's largest by population, narrowly ahead of Kings Meadows. The main shopping centre opened in the 1960s and includes: a Woolworths supermarket, a bakery, a pharmacist and some local businesses.

== History ==
Riverside was gazetted as a locality in 1958. After this time, most local services opened. Many schools opened early in the 1960s, and the businesses nowadays found were established.

== Geography ==
The Tamar River forms the north-eastern boundary and part of the south-eastern. The South Esk River also forms part of the south-eastern border. The localities of North Riverside and West Riverside both sit within this area.

== Road infrastructure ==
The West Tamar Highway (A7) passes through from south-east to north-east. Route C734 (Ecclestone Road) starts at an intersection with A7 and runs south-west and west until it exits.

== Facilities ==
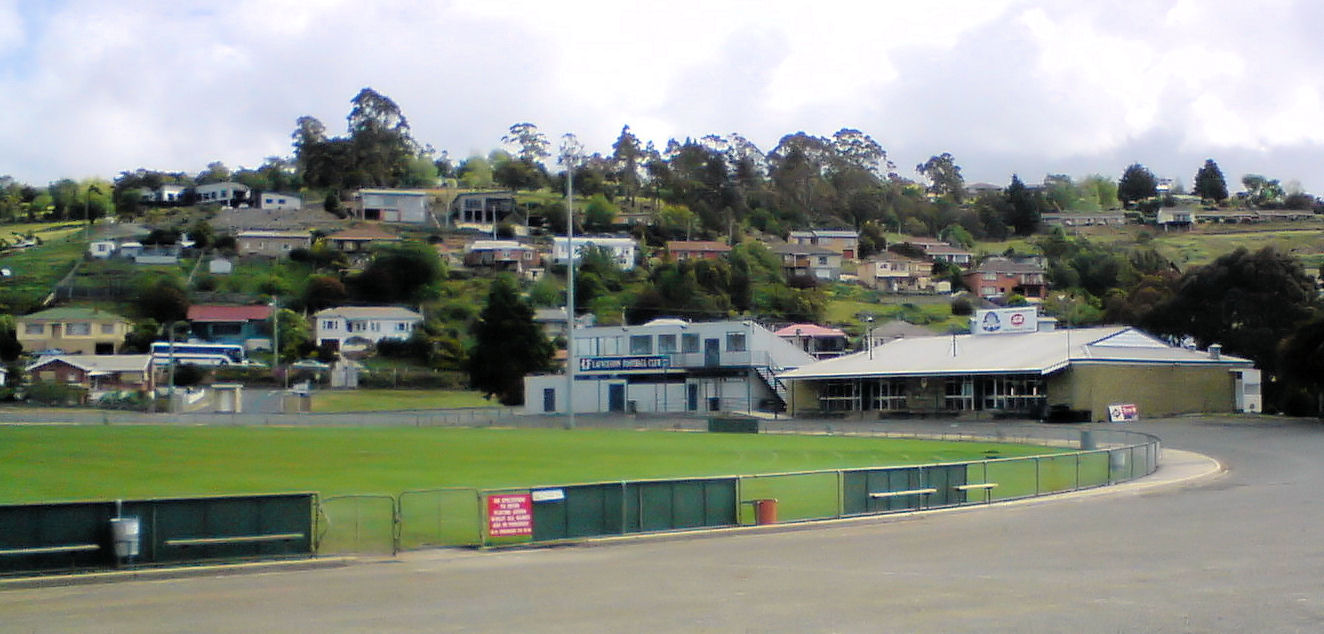
Launceston Football club, Windsor Park

There are several schools (Riverside Primary School, Riverside High School, Launceston Christian School and St Anthony's) as well as an Australian rules football ground named Windsor Park which is home to the Launceston Football Club, a soccer ground which is home to Riverside Olympic, the park also includes a cricket ground for senior players and also a junior ground used mainly by under 12 and under 14 sides, all along the course of the highway. Less than a 1 km (0.6 mi) further north there is a small complex containing a few shops including Joes IGA supermarket and St David's Church. Over the road is a restaurant, pub and bottle shop, as well as the 3.5 star Best Western Riverside motel.

Though mostly built in the 1960s, Riverside contains a wide range of buildings, with older brick and weatherboard style homes prominent along the West Tamar Highway and area's closer to the city, many of which being either Edwardian or Art Deco in style, while more modern homes are located in the western and northern areas. Few buildings in Riverside date from the 1800s, though the notable exception being Cormiston House, a former estate house from the mid-1800s, located on a large property in North Riverside

The western half of Riverside, accessed by Pomona Road, was built in the 1950s as the hydro-electric village of Marrawaylee to serve the construction of the Trevallyn Power Station. Now known as West Riverside, this minor suburb contains a single shop, the St Francis Church as well as the old hydro lodge, now modified into a private residence. The northwestern region of West Riverside has recently been the site of Riverside's most rapid urban growth, with new suburbs now connected onto Pomona Road North, Guildford Road, Tamar Rise and Balmoral Avenue.

The northern regions of the suburb, in the locality of North Riverside, have seen massive growth and are considered some of the most modern subdivisions in Launceston. As of June 2024, new constructions were being taken place in the region to the south of Cormiston Road, and to the north of New Ecclestone Road. Another majot development is associated with the new planning and construction of residential housing to the north of Cormiston Road, between the aforementioned street and Cormiston Creek. Previously considered the 'land of no life' this area has now seen major development, and creation of new streets such as Tamar Island and Rochester Courts.

The Riverside Plaza (previously Riverside Shopping Centre) opened in the 1960s.
