= Science and Engineering Challenge =

- Founded: 2000; 26 years ago Newcastle, NSW, Australia
- Type: Outreach program, non-profit
- Location: Newcastle
- Region served: Australia
- Website: www.newcastle.edu.au/challenge

The Science and Engineering Challenge (SEC) is a non-profit, STEM outreach program run throughout the schools year in Australia. The goal of the program is to challenge student’s perception of science and engineering and experience aspects of those fields that they normally would not encounter in a school environment.

The SEC focuses on inspiring students in year 10 to consider a future career in science and engineering by choosing to study science and mathematics in years 11 and 12. The SEC also includes other events such as Discovery Days and the S.M.A.R.T outreach program.

== History ==
The SEC began at the University of Newcastle as an initiative of the Faculties of Engineering and Built Environment, and Science and Information Technology. Initially, information nights were conducted aimed at giving students and parents from rural areas the opportunity to find out about careers in science and engineering. Based on the success of these information nights, the first SEC event was held on the Central Coast in the year 2000, as an activity for National Science Week. Throughout 2001, events were held around the Newcastle area and other parts of NSW.

2002 saw the first Challenge Days held outside of NSW, this took place in Canberra. Over the next three years, Challenge Days were conducted in Queensland, Tasmania, South Australia and Victoria. In 2005 the winners from each state competed at the first National Final.

In 2017 there were 110 SMART events, 49 Discovery Days for primary-aged students, and 99 Challenge Days for year 9-10 students. Overall more than 50,000 people were involved in one or more SEC programs. Almost 2,100 teachers and 3,600 other volunteers were also involved. Since 1998 over half a million people have taken part in a SEC event.

== Discovery Days ==
In 2005 the Challenge expanded yet again to include events for primary school students, called Discovery Days. These are largely the same as regular challenge events; however, the actives are simplified and typical run for a shorter period of time.

== Programs ==
1. The Little Scientists program: Train preschool teachers to incorporate STEM into their lessons
2. SMART program of science shows and workshops: Infants and Primary-aged students
3. Discovery Days: Mini-Challenge Days for students in years 5-6
4. Build a Future Days: A fascinating on-campus experience for year 7-8 students
5. Challenge Days (our premier event): National STEM competition for year 9-10 students
6. Casual work and Internships with the SEC Team
7. Teacher Professional Development: For School Teachers
