= Norwood, Tasmania =

Norwood
- Suburb
- Interactive map of Norwood
- Coordinates: 41°27′17″S 147°10′36″E
- Country: Australia
- State: Tasmania
- Region: Launceston
- City: Launceston
- LGA: City of Launceston
- Location: 5 km (3.1 mi) SE of Launceston

Government
  - State electorate: Bass
  - Federal division: Bass

Population
  - Total: 3,734 (2016 census)
- Postcode: 7250
Suburbs around Norwood
Newstead	St Leonards	St Leonards
Kings Meadows	Norwood	St Leonards
Youngtown	Youngtown	Relbia

Norwood is a residential locality in the local government area (LGA) of Launceston in the Launceston LGA region of Tasmania. The locality is about 5 kilometres (3.1 mi) south-east of the town of Launceston. The 2016 census recorded a population of 3734 for the state suburb of Norwood. It is a suburb southeast of the Launceston CBD. The minor suburb of Queechy is also included as part of Norwood. The area was opened up for development in the 1960s with considerable growth in the 1970s to 1980s and contains a mix of large, older-style family homes with patches of more modern homes, mostly in the central-eastern portion of the suburb. Norwood is located on a 60-80m high, relatively flat-topped alluvial plateau with the valley of the North Esk River to the east, the Punchbowl Reserve to the north and the Carr Villa Flora Reserve, Carr Villa Cemetery and the Kings Meadows Golf Course to the west.

== History ==
Norwood was gazetted as a locality in 1963.

== Geography ==
The North Esk River forms most of the eastern to northern boundaries.

== Road infrastructure ==
Route C403 (Quarantine Road / Johnston Road) runs through from west to east while Penquite Road provides access to the locality.

== Facilities ==
- IGA supermarket
- Primary school
- High school
- Aged care facility

== Education ==
Norwood has two public schools, Norwood Primary for years 1-6 and Queechy High for years 7-10
