= Kings Meadows =

- Suburb
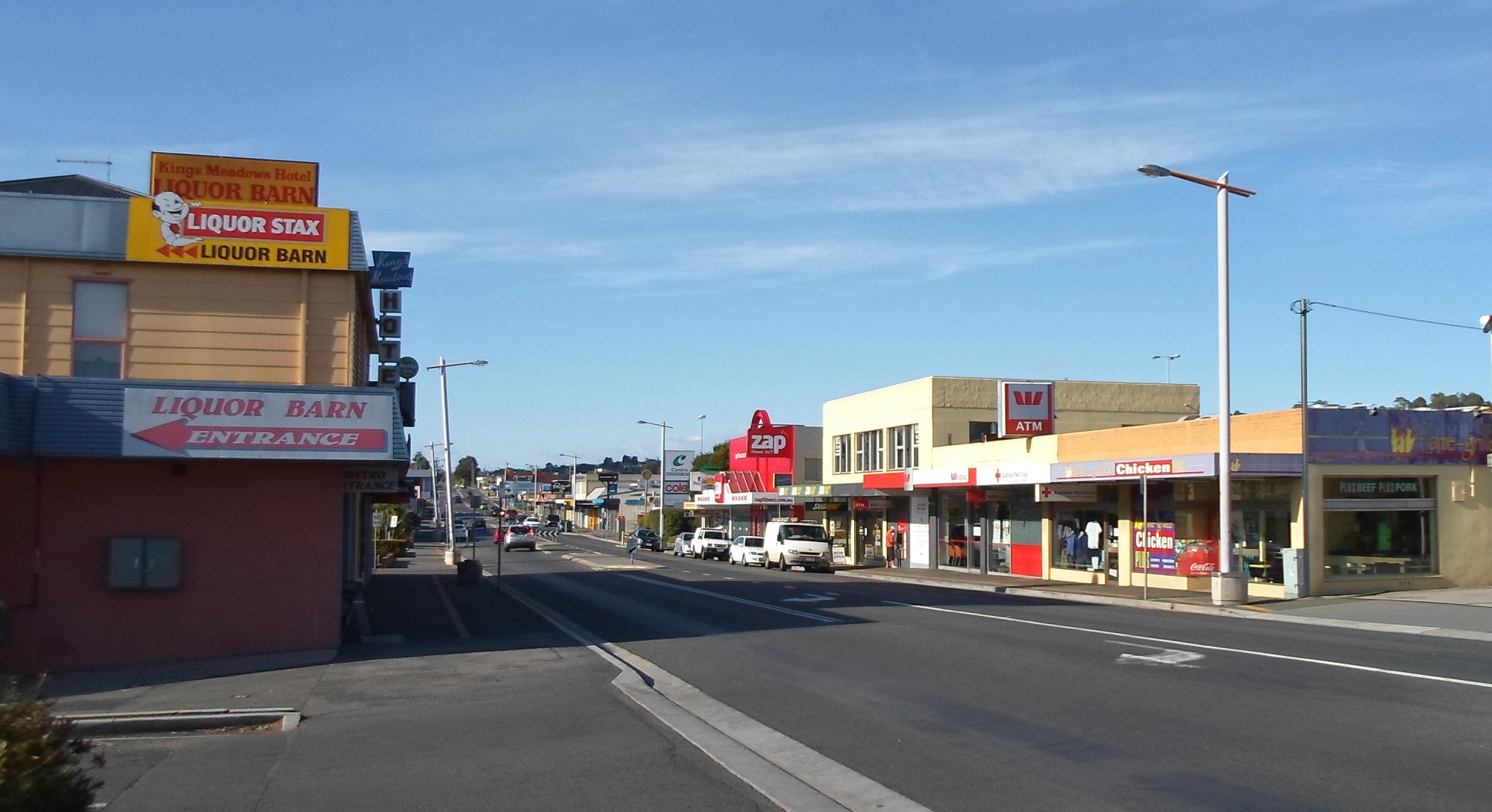
- View south down Hobart Road through Kings Meadows

- Interactive map of Kings Meadows
- Coordinates: 41°28′14″S 147°09′47″E
- Country: Australia
- State: Tasmania
- Region: Launceston
- City: Launceston
- LGA: Launceston
- Location: 5 km (3.1 mi) S of Launceston, Tasmania

Government
  - State electorate: Bass
  - Federal division: Bass

Population
  - Total: 4,359 (2021 census)
- Postcode: 7249
Suburbs around Kings Meadows
Prospect	Punchbowl, South Launceston	Norwood
Prospect	Kings Meadows	Norwood
Prospect	Youngtown	Youngtown

Kings Meadows is a residential locality in the local government area (LGA) of Launceston in the Launceston LGA region of Tasmania. The locality is about 5 kilometres (3.1 mi) south of the town of Launceston. The 2021 Australia Census recorded a population of 4359 for the state suburb of Kings Meadows. It is a suburb in the south of Launceston. Kings Meadows is located in the floor of a shallow valley, roughly 70 m above sea level, which drains NE towards the small suburb of Punchbowl. Main access to the suburb from the CBD is from Hobart Road via the minor suburb of South Launceston. Kings Meadows High School is located in this suburb.

== History ==
Kings Meadows was originally agricultural land owned by Robert Hay Marr. Marr had 600 acres in the area where he ran his farm. In 1833, the land was advertised for sale under the name "Kings Meadows". This was the first documented usage of the name. The area was then bought by Philip Oakden who leased it out in April of 1834.

Local rumor offers an alternative, but undocumented, origin story for the name; it was named after the King's Own Regiment, British troops who arrived in Tasmania in 1806. It is not established whether this is correct or whether it influence Marr's decision when naming the area.

A convict work camp was constructed at Kings Meadows, starting in August 1836 and completing in July 1837. This was part of the colonial government's Evandale to Launceston water project, which aimed to supply Launceston with fresh water from the South Esk River. The land was owned by the trustees of Elizabeth Paterson and leased to Launceston resident Anthony Best, who received £140 compensation. The camp closed by years end after the abandonment of the project. Surveys were undertaken by architect James Blackburn, surveyor William Dawson, and engineer Alexander Cheyne, who proposed converting the camp into a hospital in December of 1838.

Due to increased traffic flow through the area, a toll gate was relocated from Launceston to Hobart Town Road, Kings Meadows, next to the Sir George Arthur Inn.

Kings Meadows was gazetted as a locality in 1963.

Kings Meadows Post Office opened in 1915 and closed in 1926.

== Geography ==
The Midland Highway (National Route 1) follows most of the western boundary, and Kings Meadows Link (Route C403) follows part of the southern boundary.

== Road infrastructure ==
Route C403 (Kings Meadows Link) passes through the south-east portion of the locality from west to east.
