= East Launceston =

- Suburb
- Interactive map of East Launceston
- Coordinates: 41°26′31″S 147°09′03″E
- Country: Australia
- State: Tasmania
- Region: Launceston
- City: Launceston
- LGA: City of Launceston
- Location: 1 km (0.62 mi) E of Launceston

Government
  - State electorate: Bass
  - Federal division: Bass

Population
  - Total: 2,270 (SAL 2021)
- Postcode: 7250
Suburbs around East Launceston
Launceston	Launceston	Launceston
Launceston	East Launceston	Newstead
South Launceston	Newstead	Newstead

East Launceston is a residential locality in the local government area (LGA) of Launceston in the Launceston LGA region of Tasmania. The locality is about 1 kilometre (0.6 mi) east of the town of Launceston. The 2016 census recorded a population of 2143 for East Launceston. 78.6% of people were born in Australia and 87.3% of people spoke only English at home. The most common responses for religion were No Religion 36.8%, Anglican 20.7% and Catholic 16.2%. It is a suburb of Launceston.

== History ==
East Launceston was gazetted as a locality in 1963.

== Geography ==
Most of the boundaries are survey lines.

== Road infrastructure ==
Route A3 (Brisbane Street / Elphin Road) passes the north-western to eastern boundaries, from where various streets provide access to the locality.
