= Country Club Casino =

Casino in Launceston, Tasmania

Country Club Tasmania

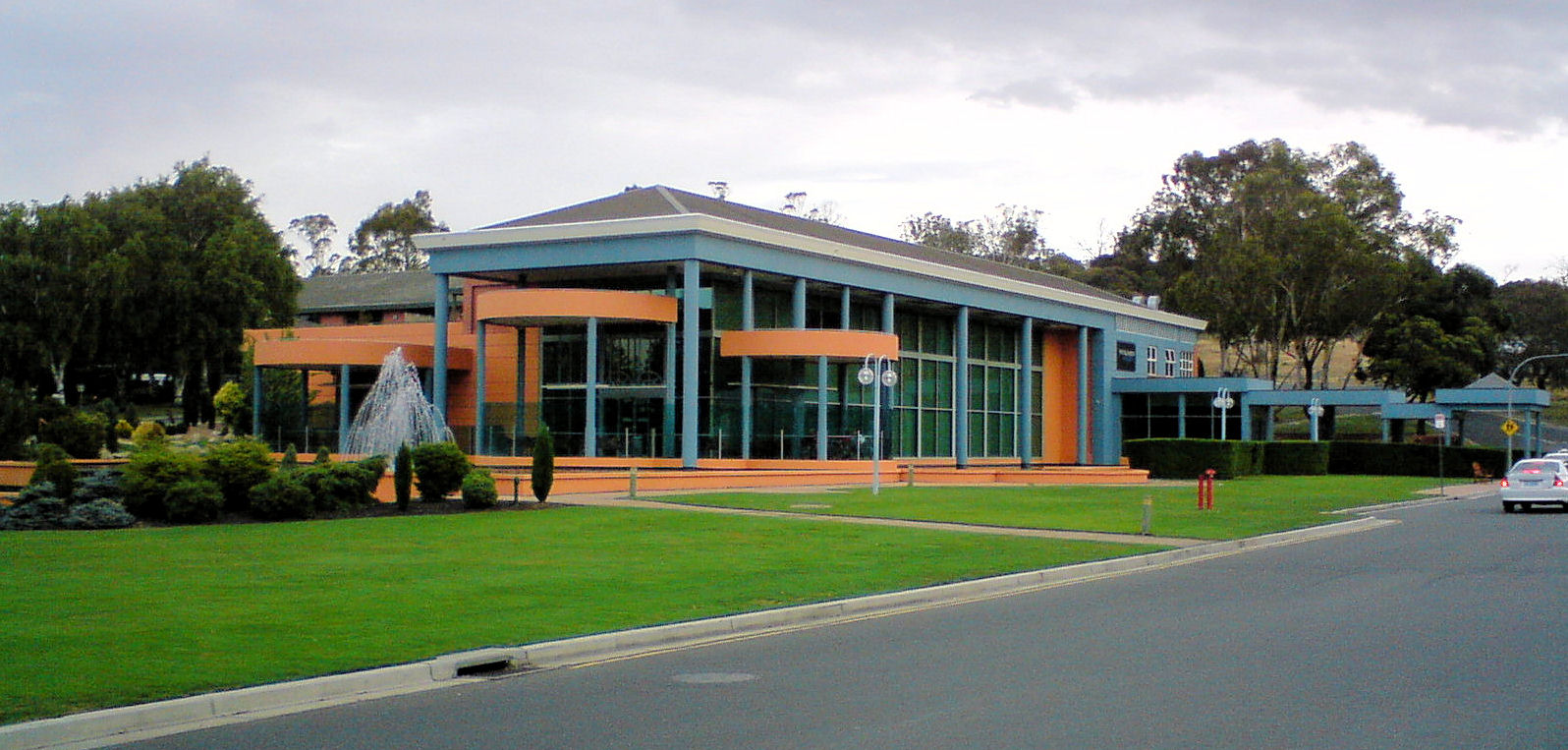
- View from the front of the casino with the Watergarden to the left and the main entrance to the right.
- Interactive map of Country Club Tasmania
- Location: Prospect Vale, Launceston, Australia; Casino Rise
- Opened: 1982
- Notable restaurants: The Watergarden
- Owner: Federal Group
- Website: Official site

In 1982, Federal Group opened the Country Club Casino and Resort. Architects modelled the style and interior design of Country Club on the stately homes of America's south. Greg Farrell senior had always admired the simple lines of the US Embassy building in Canberra and believed that the Georgian style would work well in the rural landscape of Launceston.

== Redevelopment ==
In mid-2023, Federal Group commenced a redevelopment program at Country Club Tasmania, including a project reported to involve approximately AUD $14 million to redesign and upgrade the existing golf course to championship standard. The new 18-hole course was designed by golf course architect Beau Welling, with construction involving a full reconfiguration of the course layout and playing surfaces. In parallel with the championship course redevelopment, Federal Group also commenced construction of additional golf and leisure infrastructure at the site, including a state-of-the-art mini-golf facility and a multi-storey driving range intended to expand the precinct's recreational offerings. Associated with the broader redevelopment, Federal Group initiated the staged release of up to 372 residential lots as part of the planned Country Club Estate, intended to be delivered progressively over several years adjacent to the resort and golf facilities. In late 2025, Federal Group completed the multi-storey driving range, known as The Range.
