= Trevallyn, Tasmania =

Trevallyn
- Suburb
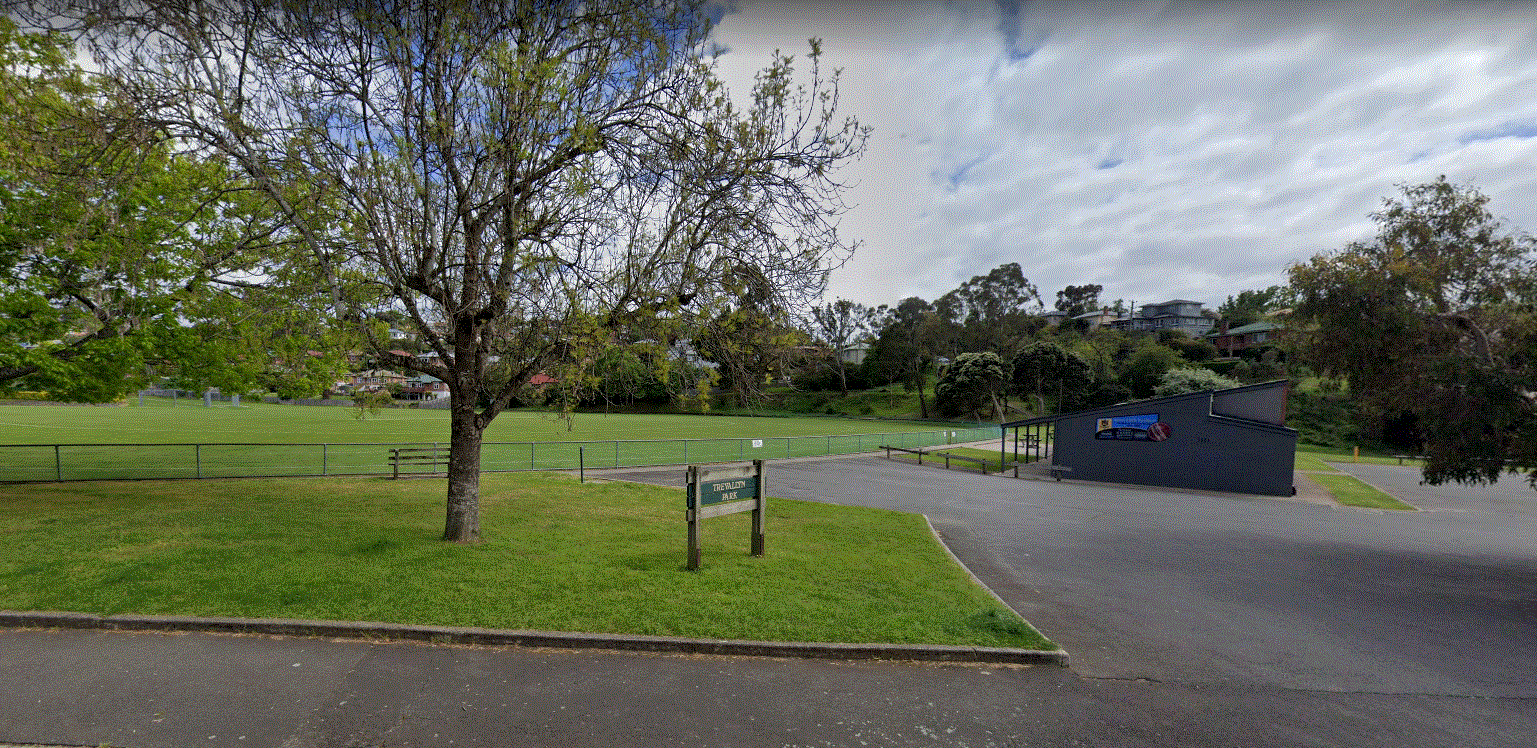
- Trevallyn Park

- Interactive map of Trevallyn
- Coordinates: 41°26′07″S 147°07′11″E
- Country: Australia
- State: Tasmania
- Region: Launceston
- City: Launceston
- LGA: West Tamar Council (75%), City of Launceston (25%)
- Location: 3 km (1.9 mi) W of Launceston
- Established: 1890s

Government
  - State electorate: Bass
  - Federal division: Bass

Population
  - Total: 4,826 (2021 census)
- Postcode: 7250
Suburbs around Trevallyn
Riverside	Riverside	Tamar River
Riverside	Trevallyn	Launceston
Riverside	Riverside	West Launceston

Trevallyn is a residential locality in the local government areas (LGAs) of Launceston (25%) and West Tamar (75%) in the Launceston LGA region of Tasmania. The locality is about 3 kilometres (1.9 mi) west of the city of Launceston. The 2021 census recorded a population of 4,826 for the state suburb of Trevallyn. It is a suburb of Launceston.

It is located on the north western part of the city (west of the Tamar River and north of the South Esk River).

== History ==
Trevallyn was gazetted as a locality in 1963.

The name of the suburb spelled backwards, Nyllavert, can be found on postal records and lists of localities; the local post office used to carry this name in the 1930s. Despite the place name no longer existing and not being officially gazetted, the name still appears in many lists and indexes of localities.

The name of the suburb could be also of Welsh origin. In that language, Trevallyn means Town of the Ax: Tref (the f sounds like a v in Welsh) means town. Allyn means Ax. It could also be simplified as Axtown. Actually, it is Cornish. Tre means town or settlement; vallyn is a mutation (common in Cornish grammar) of mellyn, meaning 'mill'. It is named after Trevallyn, Launceston, Cornwall, UK (courtesy of Professor Philip Payton, emeritus professor of Cornish and Australian Studies at the University of Exeter).

== Geography ==
The South Esk River forms the south-western and south-eastern boundaries, and the Tamar River the north-eastern.

It is the location of the Cataract Gorge and the Trevallyn Dam.

== Road infrastructure ==
Route A7 (West Tamar Road) runs through from south-east to north-east.

== Notable residents ==
Brothers Sir Benjamin Gill OAM and Sir Patrick Gill lived in Trevallyn, in Whitford Grove.

The novelist, Katharine Susannah Prichard, lived there as a child.

== Sporting clubs ==
The Trevallyn Cricket Club is based at the oval in Gorge Rd. Established in 1929, the club fields men's, women's and junior teams in the local astroturf competition. The club pavilion is named in honour of local resident, Athol Fitch.

The adjoining bowls club, Max Fry Hall and tennis courts make this area one of Launceston's premier lower grade sports precincts after York Park, and Invermay Park in the CBD, Windsor Park at Riverside and the NTCA Sporting Complex. A number of water-based sports clubs use Trevallyn Dam and the Trevallyn Nature Recreation Area is a multi-use area with horse riding, trail running and mountain bike events regularly held there.
