= West Launceston =

- Suburb
- Interactive map of West Launceston
- Coordinates: 41°27′4″S 147°7′45″E
- Country: Australia
- State: Tasmania
- Region: Launceston
- City: Launceston
- LGA: City of Launceston
- Location: 3 km (1.9 mi) SW of Launceston

Government
  - State electorate: Bass
  - Federal division: Bass

Population
  - Total: 4,212 (2016 census)
- Postcode: 7250
Suburbs around West Launceston
South Esk River	South Esk River	Launceston
South Esk River	West Launceston	South Launceston
Summerhill	Summerhill	Prospect

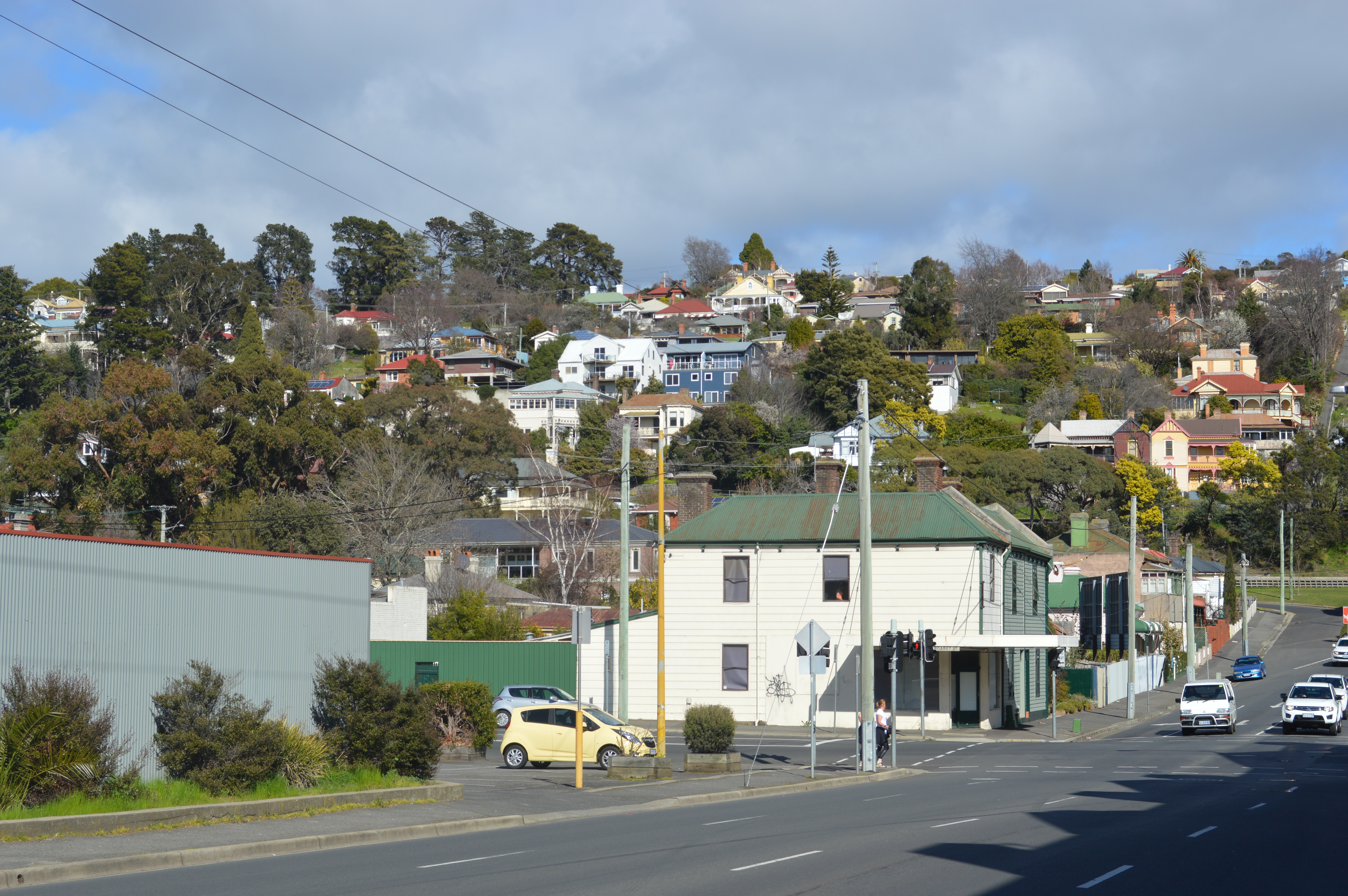
Houses in West Launceston, Tasmania

West Launceston is a residential locality in the local government area (LGA) of Launceston in the Launceston LGA region of Tasmania. The locality is about 3 kilometres (1.9 mi) south-west of the town of Launceston. The 2016 census recorded a population of 4212 for the state suburb of West Launceston. The suburb is part of the Launceston CBD and is also near Cataract Gorge.

About 2% of the population are Indigenous and 18% are foreign born. Approximately 7% of employees work in hospitals, with restaurants and education also being significant employers.

== History ==
West Launceston was gazetted as a locality in 1963.

== Geography ==
The South Esk River forms the north-western boundary.

== Road infrastructure ==
National Highway 1 (Midland Highway) passes to the east. From there, various streets provide access to the locality.
