= South Launceston =

South Launceston Launceston, Tasmania
- Coordinates: 41°27′17″S 147°08′43″E
- Population: 4,592 (2016 census)
- Postcode(s): 7249
- Location: 3 km (2 mi) S of Launceston
- LGA(s): City of Launceston
- Region: Launceston
- State electorate(s): Bass
- Federal division(s): Bass
Suburbs around South Launceston:
West Launceston	Launceston	East Launceston
West Launceston	South Launceston	Newstead
Prospect	Prospect	Kings Meadows

South Launceston is a residential locality in the local government area (LGA) of Launceston in the Launceston LGA region of Tasmania. The locality is about 3 kilometres (1.9 mi) south of the town of Launceston. The 2016 census recorded a population of 4592 for the state suburb of South Launceston. It is a suburb of Launceston, and also contains the minor suburbs of Glen Dhu and Sandhill (Five Ways).

== History ==
South Launceston is a confirmed locality. It started life as a small place called Galvin Town; by the 1890s it was included in Launceston as the suburb South Launceston. In 1906 South Launceston grew to include Sandhill.

== Geography ==
Almost all of the boundaries are survey lines.

== Road infrastructure ==
National Route 1 (Midland Highway) runs through from south-west to north.
