= Newstead, Tasmania =

Newstead
- Suburb
- Interactive map of Newstead
- Coordinates: 41°26′38″S 147°09′43″E
- Country: Australia
- State: Tasmania
- Region: Launceston
- City: Launceston
- LGA: City of Launceston
- Location: 3 km (1.9 mi) E of Launceston

Government
  - State electorate: Bass
  - Federal division: Bass

Population
  - Total: 5,617 (2021 census)
- Postcode: 7250
Suburbs around Newstead
East Launceston	East Launceston	Ravenswood
East Launceston	Newstead	Waverley
South Launceston	Punchbowl	Norwood

Newstead is a residential locality in the local government area of Launceston, Tasmania. Located approximately 3 kilometres (1.9 mi) east of the city centre, it is an inner suburb of Launceston. Schools in the area include Newstead College, Scotch Oakburn Junior School, Newstead Christian School and the Launceston Preparatory School. The 2021 census recorded a population of 5617 in the state suburb of Newstead.

== History ==
The suburb takes its name from Newstead House (10 Newstead Crescent), built around 1855 by Botanist and colonial public servant Ronald Campbell Gunn, who acquired the surrounding 300-acre estate in 1854.

During the 1860's, the area remained predominantly rural, with occupants focused on grazing and horticulture. Around 1887, land along Elphin Road between Olive and Hart streets was subdivided into quarter-acre residential blocks. The following year, the first blocks on the Newstead Estate were offered for sale. Over the next decade, residential development continued slowly, with further subdivisions along Elphin Road towards Hobbler's Bridge Road, and the establishment of St Aidan's Church of England in 1892 and Elphin Road Baptist in 1905.

In 1895, the area became more attractive to settlers when a Launceston-Newstead horse-drawn omnibus service commenced, followed by private bus operators until the opening of Launceston's electric tramway in August 1911. The tram connected Launceston City centre to David Street in Newstead before being extended in 1912. During this period, the Elphin Showgrounds became an important venue for community events, including the agricultural show by the Agricultural and Pastoral Society. In 1916, Scotch College purchase Ravenscraig in Newstead, building on and relocating by 1917.

In June 1919, the Newstead Post Office was renamed to Kawallah, reportedly to avoid confusion with another Australian locality named Newstead. However, locals did not adopt this name and Newstead was unoffically used until its reinstatement in February 1961.

After World War I, Newstead was the base of a housing scheme for returned servicemen and their families. In 1920, 36 homes began construction in Abbott, David and Malabar streets.

During the 1920s, Newstead continued to develop as a residential and recreational suburb. This included the relocation of The Northern Tasmanian Lawn Tennis Association who purchased land on Olive Street in 1925, and had constructed three tennis courts by 1926. Additionally, a Methodist church was established in 1927. In 1925, the Alexander Patent Racket Company was established and production commenced at the Wentworth st, Newstead factory in May 1926. It became Australia's first company to manufacture tennis racquets wholly within the country and were eventually distributed internationally.

Flooding periodically affected Newstead, particularly areas near the North Esk River. In July 1928, floodwaters submerged the road and railway. During the catastrophic Launceston floods of April 1929, much of the suburb was inundated. Further flooding in May 1931 saw the North Esk River rise above the railway and Hoblers Bridge.

By 1930, the suburb had seen substantial residential transformation. On Newstead Estate, Wilkinson reported that in 1914 there were 19 buildings and by 1930 there were 120.

Newstead was gazetted as a locality in 1963.

== Geography ==
The North Esk River forms most of the eastern boundary of Newstead and the land slopes towards the river's floodplain.

== Road infrastructure ==
Route A3 (Elphin Road / Hoblers Bridge Road) runs through from north-west to east.
