= Local government areas of Tasmania =

Map showing the 29 local government areas of Tasmania (border lines are approximate).

The councils of Tasmania are the 29 local administrative units of the Australian state of Tasmania. Local government areas (LGAs), more generally known as councils, are the tier of government responsible for the management of local duties such as road maintenance, town planning and waste management.

== Local government areas ==
There are 29 local government areas of Tasmania:

| Local government area | Principal town | Date established | Land area | | Demographics | | | Map |
| Local government area | Principal town | Date established | km^{2} | sq mi | Population (2022) | Density (per km^{2}) | Classification | Map |
|---|---|---|---|---|---|---|---|---|
| Break O'Day | St Helens | 1993 | 3,523.9 | 1,361 | 7,013 | 2.0 | Rural | |
| Brighton | Brighton | 1863 | 171.2 | 66 | 19,687 | 115.0 | Urban | |
| Burnie | Burnie | 1908 | 611.0 | 236 | 20,497 | 33.5 | Urban | |
| Central Coast | Ulverstone | 1993 | 933.1 | 360 | 23,360 | 25.0 | Urban | |
| Central Highlands | Hamilton | 1993 | 7,982.4 | 3,082 | 2,585 | 0.3 | Rural | |
| Circular Head | Smithton | 1907 | 4,898.0 | 1,891 | 8,383 | 1.7 | Rural | |
| Clarence | Rosny Park | 1860 | 378.0 | 146 | 63,138 | 167.0 | Urban | |
| Derwent Valley | New Norfolk | 1994 | 4,108.1 | 1,586 | 11,251 | 2.7 | Rural | |
| Devonport | Devonport | 1907 | 111.3 | 43 | 26,970 | 242.4 | Urban | |
| Dorset | Scottsdale | 1993 | 3,230.5 | 1,247 | 7,022 | 2.2 | Rural | |
| Flinders | Whitemark | 1907 | 1,996.6 | 771 | 931 | 0.5 | Rural | |
| George Town | George Town | 1907 | 653.4 | 252 | 7,281 | 11.1 | Rural | |
| Glamorgan–Spring Bay | Triabunna | 1993 | 2,591.6 | 1,001 | 5,194 | 2.0 | Rural | |
| Glenorchy | Glenorchy | 1864 | 121.1 | 47 | 51,083 | 421.6 | Urban | |
| Hobart | Hobart | 1852 | 77.9 | 30 | 56,043 | 719.5 | Urban | |
| Huon Valley | Huonville | 1993 | 5,507.4 | 2,126 | 19,221 | 3.5 | Rural | |
| Kentish | Sheffield | 1907 | 1,156.2 | 446 | 6,807 | 5.9 | Rural | |
| King Island | Currie | 1907 | 1,095.7 | 423 | 1,677 | 1.5 | Rural | |
| Kingborough | Kingston | 1907 | 720.1 | 278 | 40,979 | 56.9 | Urban | |
| Latrobe | Latrobe | 1907 | 600.5 | 232 | 12,926 | 21.5 | Rural | |
| Launceston | Launceston | 1852 | 1,413.6 | 546 | 71,980 | 50.9 | Urban | |
| Meander Valley | Westbury | 1993 | 3,330.8 | 1,286 | 21,369 | 6.4 | Rural | |
| Northern Midlands | Longford | 1993 | 5,135.3 | 1,983 | 14,143 | 2.8 | Rural | |
| Sorell | Sorell | 1862 | 583.8 | 225 | 17,430 | 29.9 | Semi-rural | |
| Southern Midlands | Oatlands | 1993 | 2,615.5 | 1,010 | 6,891 | 2.6 | Rural | |
| Tasman | Nubeena | 1907 | 660.4 | 255 | 2,671 | 4.0 | Rural | |
| Waratah–Wynyard | Wynyard | 1993 | 3,535.9 | 1,365 | 14,695 | 4.0 | Rural | |
| West Coast | Queenstown | 1993 | 9,583.5 | 3,700 | 4,358 | 0.5 | Rural | |
| West Tamar | Beaconsfield | 1993 | 691.1 | 267 | 25,955 | 37.6 | Urban | |

== Towns and suburbs of local government areas ==
Map of local government areas of Tasmania

The local government areas include the following towns and suburbs, with some towns and suburbs some spanning multiple local government areas:

=== Break O'Day Council ===
- Chain of Lagoons
- Falmouth
- Fingal
- Scamander
- St Helens
- St Marys

=== Brighton Council ===
- Bridgewater
- Brighton
- Gagebrook
- Old Beach
- Pontville
- Tea Tree

=== Central Coast Council ===
- Cuprona
- Forth
- Gawler
- Howth
- Penguin
- Sulphur Creek
- Turners Beach
- Ulverstone
- Upper Castra
- West Pine
- West Ulverstone

=== Central Highlands Council ===
- Bothwell
- Bronte Park
- Derwent Bridge
- Hamilton
- Liawenee
- Miena
- Ouse
- Tarraleah

=== Circular Head Council ===
- Black River
- Edith Creek
- Forest
- Hellyer
- Irishtown
- Marrawah
- Mawbanna
- Mengha
- Redpa
- Rocky Cape
- Smithton
- Stanley
- Wiltshire

=== City of Burnie ===
- Acton
- Brooklyn
- Camdale
- Chasm Creek
- Cooee
- Downlands
- East Cam
- East Ridgley
- Emu Heights
- Glance Creek
- Hampshire
- Havenview
- Highclere
- Hillcrest
- Montello
- Mooreville
- Natone
- Ocean Vista
- Park Grove
- Parklands
- Ridgley
- Romaine
- Round Hill
- Shorewell Park
- South Burnie
- Stowport
- Tewkesbury
- Upper Burnie
- Upper Natone
- Upper Stowport
- West Mooreville
- West Ridgley
- Wivenhoe

=== City of Clarence ===
- Acton
- Bellerive
- Cambridge
- Clarendon Vale
- Cremorne
- Geilston Bay
- Howrah
- Lauderdale
- Lindisfarne
- Mornington
- Opossum Bay
- Otago
- Richmond
- Risdon
- Risdon Vale
- Rokeby
- Rose Bay
- Rosny
- Seven Mile Beach
- South Arm
- Tranmere
- Warrane

=== City of Devonport ===
- Ambleside
- Don
- East Devonport
- Eugenana
- Miandetta
- Paloona
- Quoiba
- Spreyton
- Stony Rise
- Tugrah

=== City of Glenorchy ===
- Austins Ferry
- Berriedale
- Chigwell
- Claremont
- Collinsvale
- Derwent Park
- Dowsing Point
- Glenlusk
- Glenorchy
- Goodwood
- Granton
- Lutana
- Montrose
- Moonah
- Rosetta
- West Moonah

=== City of Hobart ===
- Battery Point
- Dynnyrne
- Fern Tree
- Glebe
- Hobart
- Lenah Valley
- Mount Nelson
- Mount Stuart
- New Town
- North Hobart
- Ridgeway
- Sandy Bay
- South Hobart
- Tolmans Hill
- West Hobart

=== City of Launceston ===
- Dilston
- East Launceston
- Invermay
- Kings Meadows
- Launceston
- Lilydale
- Mayfield
- Mowbray
- Newnham
- Newstead
- Norwood
- Punchbowl
- Ravenswood
- Relbia
- Rocherlea
- South Launceston
- St Leonards
- Summerhill
- Swan Bay
- Trevallyn
- Waverley
- West Launceston
- Windermere
- Youngtown

=== Derwent Valley Council ===
- Adamsfield
- Black Hills
- Boyer
- Bushy Park
- Feilton
- Fenton Forest
- Fitzgerald
- Glenfern
- Glenora
- Granton
- Hayes
- Karanja
- Lachlan
- Lawitta
- Macquarie Plains
- Magra
- Malbina
- Maydena
- Molesworth
- Moogara
- Mount Field
- Mount Lloyd
- National Park
- New Norfolk
- Plenty
- Rosegarland
- Sorell Creek
- Strathgordon
- Tyenna
- Upper Plenty
- Uxbridge
- Westerway

=== Dorset Council ===
- Branxholm
- Bridport
- Derby
- Scottsdale
- Winnaleah

=== Flinders Council ===
- Cape Barren Island
- Emita
- Flinders Island
- Whitemark

=== George Town Council ===
- Bell Bay
- George Town
- Mount Direction

=== Glamorgan Spring Bay Council ===
- Bicheno
- Coles Bay
- Cranbrook
- Orford
- Swansea
- Triabunna

=== Huon Valley Council ===
- Barretts Bay
- Brooks Bay
- Cairns Bay
- Castle Forbes Bay
- Charlotte Cove
- Crabtree
- Cradoc
- Cygnet
- Deep Bay
- Dover
- Eggs & Bacon Bay
- Franklin
- Garden Island Creek
- Garden Island Sands
- Gardners Bay
- Geeveston
- Glaziers Bay
- Glen Huon
- Glendevie
- Golden Valley
- Grove
- Hastings
- Huonville
- Ida Bay
- Judbury
- Lonnavale
- Lower Longley
- Lower Wattle Grove
- Lucaston
- Lune River
- Lymington
- Mountain River
- Nicholls Rivulet
- Pelverata
- Petcheys Bay
- Police Point
- Port Huon
- Raminea
- Randalls Bay
- Ranelagh
- Recherche
- Southport
- Strathblane
- Surges Bay
- Surveyors Bay
- Upper Woodstock
- Verona Sands
- Wattle Grove
- Woodstock

=== Kentish Council ===
- Acacia Hills
- Cradle Mountain
- Liena
- Mersey Forest
- Railton
- Sheffield
- Weegena

=== King Island Council ===
- Currie
- Grassy
- King Island

=== Kingborough Council ===
- Adventure Bay
- Albion Heights
- Allens Rivulet
- Alonnah
- Apollo Bay
- Barnes Bay
- Blackmans Bay
- Bonnet Hill
- Coningham
- Cradoc
- Dennes Point
- Electrona
- Gordon
- Great Bay
- Howden
- Huntingfield
- Kaoota
- Kettering
- Killora
- Kingston
- Kingston Beach
- Longley
- Lower Longley
- Lucaston
- Lunawanna
- Margate
- Neika
- North Bruny
- Oyster Cove
- Pelverata
- Sandfly
- Simpsons Bay
- South Bruny
- Snug
- Taroona
- The Lea
- Tinderbox
- Woodstock

=== Latrobe Council ===
- Harford
- Hawley Beach
- Latrobe
- Moriarty
- Port Sorell
- Sassafras
- Shearwater

=== Meander Valley Council ===
- Birralee
- Blackstone Heights
- Carrick
- Deloraine
- Dunorlan
- Hagley
- Hadspen
- Liena
- Mayberry
- Mersey Forest
- Mole Creek
- Moltema
- Montana
- Needles
- Parkham
- Prospect Vale
- Red Hills
- Weegena
- Weetah
- Westbury
- Western Creek

=== Municipality of Tasman ===
- Koonya
- Murdunna
- Nubeena
- Port Arthur

=== Northern Midlands Council ===
- Avoca
- Campbell Town
- Cressy
- Evandale
- Liffey
- Longford
- Perth

=== Sorell Council ===
- Bream Creek
- Carlton River
- Connellys Marsh
- Copping
- Dodges Ferry
- Dunalley
- Kellevie
- Lewisham
- Marion Bay
- Midway Point
- Pawleena
- Sorell
- Wattle Hill

=== Southern Midlands Council ===
- Bagdad
- Campania
- Oatlands
- Ross

=== Waratah-Wynyard Council ===
- Boat Harbour Beach
- Calder
- Mount Hicks
- Myalla
- Oldina}
- Preolenna
- Savage River
- Sisters Beach
- Somerset
- Waratah
- Wynyard

=== West Coast Council ===
- Queenstown
- Rosebery
- Strahan
- Tullah
- Zeehan

=== West Tamar Council ===
- Badger Head
- Beaconsfield
- Beauty Point
- Bridgenorth
- Deviot
- Exeter
- Flowery Gully
- Gravelly Beach
- Greens Beach
- Holwell
- Lanena
- Legana
- Loira
- Riverside
- Rosevears
- Sidmouth

== Former local government areas ==
Tasmania has had a number of former local government areas. In 1907, the 149 road trusts or town boards (LGAs) of Tasmania were reduced by mergers and amalgamations to 53 LGAs. By the time of a large scale overhaul in 1993, 46 LGAs were reduced to the present-day 29.

== See also ==
- List of localities in Tasmania
- Government of Tasmania
