= Rosny College =

Location
- 20 Bastick Street; Rosny Park, Hobart, Tasmania; Australia; 42°52′09″S 147°21′52″E

Information
- Type: Government comprehensive senior college
- Established: 1973; 53 years ago
- Status: Open
- School district: Southern
- Educational authority: Department for Education, Children and Young People
- Oversight: Office of Tasmanian Assessment, Standards & Certification
- Principal: Andrew Woodham
- Staff: 93.6 FTE (2023)
- Teaching staff: 70.5 FTE (2023)
- Years: 11–12
- Enrolment: 852.8 FTE (2023)
- Campus type: Urban area
- Website: www.rosnycollege.education.tas.edu.au

Rosny College is a government comprehensive senior secondary school located in Rosny Park, a suburb of Hobart, Tasmania, Australia. Established in 1973, the college caters for approximately 900 students in Years 11 and 12. The college is administered by the Department for Education, Children and Young People.

In 2023 student enrolments were 852.8 FTE. The college principal is Andrew Woodham.

== History ==
Rosny College was founded in 1973 to provide opportunities for post-Year 10 education in the City of Clarence and it draws the large majority of its students from associated schools on the eastern shore of the River Derwent in Hobart, including Bayview Secondary College, the Clarence, Rose Bay, and Sorell High Schools, and the Campania, Tasman, and Triabunna District Schools. The college is located close to the River Derwent and to the commercial and business centre of the district, which provide educational opportunities for its students.

== Notable alumni ==
- Asta (musician) - singer-songwriter
- Tim Paine - former captain of the Australia national cricket team
- Rebecca White - former leader of the Tasmanian Labor Party
- Saroo Brierley - author and businessman
- Richard Flanagan - author and Rhodes Scholar
- Matthew Wade - Australian cricketer
- Jack Riewoldt - former professional Australian rules footballer
- Essie Davis - actress and singer
- John Xintavelonis - actor and comedian
- Brendon Bolton - Australian rules football coach
- Bonnie Sveen - actress
- Paula Wriedt - Mayor of Kingborough and former member of the Tasmanian House of Assembly
- Daniel Sproule - former Australian field hockey player
- Sean Byrne (filmmaker) - writer/director
- Neil Triffett - creator of Emo the Musical
- Simon Palfrey - English Scholar
- Scott Goodman - swimmer
- Lisa Gormley - actress
- Lisa Hill (political scientist)- academic

== See also ==
- List of schools in Tasmania
- Education in Tasmania
