= Hellyer College =

Location
- Burnie, North-western Tasmania; Australia; 41°03′39″S 145°53′01″E

Information
- Type: Government comprehensive senior college
- Established: 1976; 50 years ago
- Status: Open
- School district: Northern
- Educational authority: Department for Education, Children and Young People
- Oversight: Office of Tasmanian Assessment, Standards & Certification
- Principal: Shane Cleaver
- Teaching staff: 51.1 FTE (2019)
- Years: 10–12
- Enrolment: 710 (2019)
- Campus type: Regional
- Colours: Maroon, navy blue
- Website: www.hellyercollege.education.tas.edu.au

Hellyer College (often stylised as hellyer college) is a government comprehensive senior secondary school located in Burnie in north-western Tasmania, Australia. Established in 1976, the college caters for approximately 630 students in Year 10, 11 and 12 and is administered by the Department for Education, Children and Young People. Hellyer College is situated on the same campus as the TAFE Tasmania (Burnie Campus).

Hellyer College is the smallest (in terms of student numbers) college in Tasmania. Hellyer's main feeding schools are Wynyard High School, Burnie High School, Parklands High School and several others stretching along the north-west. Students from the west coast in rural areas of Tasmania and King Island also attend Hellyer College and stay at the accommodation provided by the college.

In 2019 student enrolments were 710. The college principal is Shane Cleaver

== History ==
Established in 1976, it provides academic and vocational training to around 850 students from North-West Tasmania, including the West Coast, Circular Head and King Island. Hellyer College was named after Henry Hellyer, who was an explorer in north west Tasmania during the 1820s. In 2009 it became part of the Burnie Campus of the Tasmanian Academy (ex Hellyer College) and Burnie Campus of the Tasmanian Polytechnic (ex TAFE Burnie and Hellyer College).

Prior to 1990, Hellyer College catered for students wanting a university pathway (matriculation), and had between 450 and 500 students. Changes in the Australian unemployment laws and the ways in which students aged between 16-18 were able to obtain financial support meant the College began to offer a more comprehensive curriculum, including VET (Vocational Education and Training), to fit the broader range of students continuing on to years 10, 11 and 12. Because of this and the high youth unemployment rate on the North West Coast of Tasmania, the student numbers at Hellyer College grew rapidly reaching a peak of around 1000 in 1995. The College now offers a range of subjects and courses, a student support program, a range of extra-curricular activities, and strong links into the local community.

In 2018, the Autism Specific Early Learning & Care Centre located on the grounds of the Hellyer College campus relocated into the CBD of Burnie. This move resulted in Hellyer College incorporating the building into their existing campus, being renamed to "R Block". The same year, the Hellyer Regional Collective was established with the aims to streamline education on the North West coast. Schools in the collective are Hellyer College, Penguin District School, Smithton High School, King Island High School, Mountain Heights High School, Roseberry High School, Wynyard High School, Yolla District High School, Burnie High School, and Parklands High School.

2020 saw the first major renovations at the school, with the math and science facilities receiving $3.5 million in funding to refurbish the 43-year-old facilities. This including a revamp of the science labs, math classrooms, student study areas, and teacher offices. The space was officially opened in August 2020.

== Line system ==
Hellyer College uses a time tabling system called lines. There are five lines; to each line students can assign one class. On Mondays, Wednesdays and Fridays lines 1, 2 and 3 are done. On Tuesdays and Thursdays, lines 4 and 5 are done. Typically Year 10, 11 and 12 students take four subjects, leaving one free line for study.

== Notable alumni ==
- Cameron Baird VC, MG – Australian soldier, posthumously awarded the Victoria Cross for actions in Afghanistan
- Eddie Jones – head coach of the English national rugby union team since 2015; former coach of the Wallabies
- Robert Beech-Jones – Current Justice of the High Court of Australia; former Justice of the Supreme Court of New South Wales

== See also ==
- List of schools in Tasmania
- Education in Tasmania
