= Newstead College =

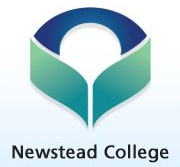

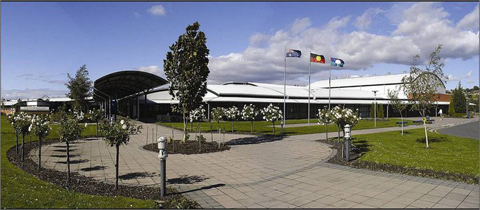
- Front of Newstead College

Location
- 30 Cypress Street; Launceston, Tasmania; Australia; 41°25′59″S 147°9′34″E

Information
- Type: Government comprehensive senior college
- Motto: Excellence, opportunity, success
- Established: 1997; 29 years ago
- Status: Open
- School district: Northern
- Educational authority: Department for Education, Children and Young People
- Oversight: Office of Tasmanian Assessment, Standards & Certification
- Principal: Dianne Freeman
- Teaching staff: 30 FTE (2023)
- Years: 10–12
- Enrolment: 400 (2023)
- Campus type: Regional urban area
- Website: newsteadcollege.education.tas.edu.au

Newstead College is a government comprehensive senior secondary school located in Newstead, a suburb of Launceston, Tasmania, Australia. Established in 1997, the college caters for approximately 500 students in Years 10, 11 and 12. The college is administered by the Department for Education, Children and Young People.

== History ==
The first intake of students to Newstead College was in 1997, However, in late 1996 high school students from around the region were shown through the college while the final work was carried out. During 1997, the College hosted various government figures who toured the College grounds and students attended many ceremonies for the College opening.

== Curriculum ==
Newstead College offers a broad range of subjects and study options. There is a wide offering of both TASC-approved subjects and VET courses. These include;

=== TASC-approved ===
- English
- Health and Physical Education
- Humanities and Social Sciences
- Languages
- Mathematics
- Science
- Technologies
- The Arts

=== VET ===
- Furniture Making
- Hairdressing
- Automotive
- Tourism
- Retail
- Business
- Hospitality

The College is well known for its music and drama programs, particularly the Rock Music Summer School which was held on campus for over ten years; that ceased in 2016, the year after the departure of music director, Roger Francis.

== Looking Glass Productions ==
Looking Glass Productions is Newstead Campus's production company which puts together and performs an annual production of professional quality in August at the Princess Theatre. Newstead now perform smaller productions in their own auditorium. Looking Glass Productions includes:

Date	Production name	Notes
2006	The Wizard of Oz	
2007	Cabaret	
2008	Cats	
2009	Jesus Christ Superstar	
2010	Dusty – The Original Pop Diva	
2011	Peter Pan: The British Musical	
2012	A Midsummer Night's Dream	
2013	Xanadu	
2014	Godspell	
2015	Pippin	
2016	The Little Mermaid	
2017	The Wizard Of Oz	
2018	Disenchanted!	
2019	Little Shop of Horrors	This marks the last year performances were held at The Princess Theatre
2020	The Addams Family	
2021	Legally Blonde	
2022	Freaky Friday	
2023	Heathers: Teen Edition	
2024	Cinderella	
2025	SIX: Teen Edition	
2026	The Lightning Thief (musical)	
2027	TBA	

== Notable alumni ==
- Todd Hodgetts OAM, an Australian shot put athlete on the autism spectrum
- Toby Nankervis, an Australian rules footballer, playing for Richmond Football Club since 2017

== See also ==
- Education in Tasmania
- List of schools in Tasmania
