= Cosgrove High School =

School in Tasmania, Australia

Location
- Glenorchy, Hobart, Tasmania; Australia; 42°50′10″S 147°16′58″E

Information
- Type: Government comprehensive junior secondary school
- Motto: Each for all
- Established: 6 February 1951; 75 years ago
- Status: Open
- School district: Southern
- Educational authority: Department for Education, Children and Young People
- Oversight: Office of Tasmanian Assessment, Standards & Certification
- Principal: Anthony Coe
- Teaching staff: 19.1 FTE (2019)
- Years: 7–10
- Gender: Co-educational
- Enrolment: 183 (2019)
- Campus type: Suburban area
- Houses: Barton; Deakin; Hughes; Parkes
- Website: cosgrovehigh.education.tas.edu.au

Cosgrove High School is a government co-educational comprehensive junior secondary school located in Glenorchy, a suburb of Hobart, Tasmania, Australia. Established in 1951 and named in honour of Sir Robert Cosgrove, the school caters for approximately 200 students from Years 7 to 10. The school is administered by the Department for Education, Children and Young People.

In 2019 student enrolments were 183. The school principal is Anthony Coe.

== History ==
Established in 1951 as the Robert Cosgrove Modern School, in 1962 the school's name was changed to the Robert Cosgrove High School, and in 1968 changed to its current name, Cosgrove High School.

In November 2020, a fire broke out in one of the buildings which hosted Year 9 and 10 students, as well as staff offices. All students were temporarily relocated to Claremont College for two weeks as repairs were being done. Two teenagers were charged with arson in response.

== Houses ==
Cosgrove High School has four houses:

- Barton, named after Edmund Barton
- Deakin, named after Alfred Deakin
- Hughes, named after Billy Hughes
- Parkes, named after Henry Parkes

== Notable alumni ==
- Scott Bacon, a former politician who represented the electorates of Denison and then Clark in the Tasmanian House of Assembly as a member of the Labor Party
- Julie Collins, federal politician representing Franklin.

== Notable staff ==
- Julie Warn

== See also ==
- List of schools in Tasmania
- Education in Tasmania
