= Devonport High School =

Location
- 91 Best Street; Devonport, Tasmania; Australia; 41°10′37″S 146°21′04″E

Information
- Type: Government comprehensive secondary school
- Status: Open
- School district: Northern
- Educational authority: Department for Education, Children and Young People
- Oversight: Office of Tasmanian Assessment, Standards & Certification
- Principal: Peter Bird
- Teaching staff: 33.9 FTE (2019)
- Years: 7–12
- Gender: Co-educational
- Enrolment: 476 (2019)
- Campus type: Regional
- Website: devonporthigh.education.tas.edu.au

Devonport High School is a government co-educational comprehensive junior secondary school located in Devonport, Tasmania, Australia. The school caters for approximately 500 students from Years 7 to 12. The school is administered by the Department for Education, Children and Young People.

In 2019 student enrolments were 476. The school principal is Peter Bird.

In March 2017, it was announced that the school was one of eighteen high schools expanded from Years 7 to 10, to cover Years 11 and 12.

== See also ==
- List of schools in Tasmania
- Education in Tasmania
