= Deloraine High School =

School in Tasmania, Australia

Location
- 24 Lansdowne Place; Deloraine, Tasmania; Australia; 41°31′44″S 146°39′32″E

Information
- Type: Government comprehensive secondary school
- Motto: Strive to excel
- Established: 1 January 1952; 74 years ago
- Status: Open
- School district: Northern
- Educational authority: Department for Education, Children and Young People
- Oversight: Office of Tasmanian Assessment, Standards & Certification
- Principal: David Lietzau
- Teaching staff: 21.7 FTE (2019)
- Years: 7–12
- Gender: Co-educational
- Enrolment: 268 (2019)
- Campus type: Regional
- Website: delorainehigh.education.tas.edu.au

Deloraine High School is a government co-educational comprehensive secondary school located in Deloraine, Tasmania, Australia. Established in 1952, the school caters for approximately 300 students from Years 7 to 12. The school is administered by the Department for Education, Children and Young People.

In 2020, student enrolments were 270. The school principal is David Lietzau.

== Description ==
In 1991, Deloraine High School had a major redevelopment costing approximately AUD$1 million and it upgraded the main core classrooms, the music classroom, and the two science labs.

In 2019, the Office of Tasmanian Assessment, Standards, and Certification reported that 55% of students achieved the Tasmanian Certificate of Education, 33% achieved an Australian Tertiary Admission Rank, and 12% attained a VET Certificate.

In 2020, the Australian Curriculum, Assessment and Reporting Authority reported that Deloraine High School reported that of the 270 students enrolled, 57% were identified as boys, 14% identified themselves as Indigenous, and 3% had a language background other than English.

== See also ==
- List of schools in Tasmania
- Education in Tasmania
