= Ogilvie High School =

Location
- 228 New Town Rd, New Town TAS 7008; New Town, Hobart, Tasmania; Australia; 42°51′20″S 147°18′0″E

Information
- Type: Government comprehensive junior secondary school
- Motto: Today
- Established: 21 July 1937 (as New Town Commercial High School)
- Status: Closed
- Closed: 2021
- School district: Southern
- Educational authority: Department for Education, Children and Young People
- Oversight: Office of Tasmanian Assessment, Standards & Certification
- Principal: Andrew Hughes
- Teaching staff: 41.9 FTE (2019)
- Years: 7-10
- Gender: Co-Education
- Enrolment: 626 (2019)
- Campus type: Suburban
- Houses: Miller; Williams; Steane; Venn; Dando
- Colours: Maroon, grey & white
- Website: ogilviehigh.education.tas.edu.au (archived)

Ogilvie High School was a government comprehensive junior secondary school, located in New Town, a suburb of Hobart, Tasmania, Australia. Established in 1937, the school caters for approximately 600 students from Years 7 to 10. The school was administered by the Department for Education, Children and Young People.

In 2019 student enrolments were 626. The school principal is Duncan Groves.

It was the only government all girls school in the state, the only other government single-sex school being New Town High School for boys. In 2004, the school was also named as one of the top ten best schools in Australia in 2004.

It was merged with New Town High School to form Hobart City High School from the 2022 school year. The Ogilvie High School site is referred to as the Ogilvie Campus of the new school.

== History ==
Established in 1937 as New Town Commercial High School, a selective co-educational school, in 1940 the school was renamed A. G. Ogilvie High School in honour of Albert Ogilvie, the Premier of Tasmania, who died in 1939. The school remained co-educational until 1963, after which it became an all girls' school.

In 2006 the School underwent renovations which provided three new drama/dance studios. The school also recently built a Student Centre, which comprised a healthy-eating cafeteria, cafe and catering and domestic kitchens as well as a student lounge. This development won first place in the Australian Institute of Architects' 2011 Tasmanian Architecture Awards, and the cafeteria was awarded silver accreditation level in the 2011 Cool Canteen Accreditation Program.

In 2012, Ogilvie High School celebrated its seventy-fifth anniversary.

In 2022, Ogilvie High School combined with New Town High School to form the co-ed Hobart City High School.

== Curricula ==
The school offered a diverse range of academic and non-academic educational programs for girls and a number of enriching optional choices including Robotics, Outdoor Education, the Arts, Sciences and Action for Social Justice.

=== Co-curricula activities ===
Ogilvie High offered a large range of sports throughout the year including badminton, basketball, hockey, outdoor soccer, indoor soccer, futsal, outdoor cricket, squash, volleyball, waterpolo, netball, rowing, rockclimbing, touch football, team sailing, table tennis and orienteering.

Students also have the opportunity to participate in events and activities such as athletics knockouts, bushwalking, football gala day, tennis coaching, school basketball championships, school gymnastics, horse trials, surf league, outdoor education, fun runs and indoor rockclimbing.

Sport badges are awarded to students who have gained significant achievements in this area. The badges are offered at three levels: gold, silver and bronze. Each level has a set of specific selection criteria that must be met for students to be eligible.

The school has sports fields and grounds, tennis and netball courts, a gymnasium and a fitness centre called Ozone, which is to the right of the gym in the Hills block.

== See also ==
- List of schools in Tasmania
- Education in Tasmania
