= Kingston High School (Tasmania) =

School in Tasmania, Australia

Location
- 6 Kingston View Drive; Kingston, Hobart, Tasmania; Australia; 42°58′14″S 147°17′16″E

Information
- Type: Government comprehensive junior secondary school
- Established: 2 December 1972; 53 years ago
- Status: Open
- School district: Southern
- Educational authority: Department for Education, Children and Young People
- Oversight: Office of Tasmanian Assessment, Standards & Certification
- Principal: Megan Bennell (Acting Principal)
- Teaching staff: 46.6 FTE (2019)
- Years: 7–10
- Gender: Co-educational
- Enrolment: 643 (2019)
- Campus type: Suburban
- Houses: Hartz; Nelson; Wellington; Mangana
- Colours: White, blue & teal
- Website: kingstonhigh.education.tas.edu.au

Kingston High School is a government co-educational comprehensive junior secondary school located in Kingston, a suburb of Hobart, Tasmania, Australia. Established in 1972, the school caters for approximately 700 students from Years 7 to 10. The school is administered by the Department for Education, Children and Young People.

In 2019 student enrolments were 643.

The school is a six-stream school, with at least six class groups for each year level at the school.

== History ==
Kingston High School was opened on 2 December 1972 by the Minister for Education, Bill Neilson. The school had an initial enrolment of 168 students, with students coming from the rural townships surrounding Kingston. In 2000 student numbers peaked at 797 students, with enrolments steadily declining over the next six years. Since 2007, numbers have been steadily growing again with the student population expected to continue to increase.

Redevelopment of the Kingston High School campus was announced in 2007 and construction commenced in May 2009. The school relocated from the old Kingston CBD campus to the Kingston View Drive campus at the beginning of the 2011 school year and was officially opened on 4 November 2011.

== See also ==
- List of schools in Tasmania
- Education in Tasmania
