= Hobart City High School =

Location
- 228 New Town Rd, New Town TAS 7008; New Town, Hobart, Tasmania; Australia; 42°51′20″S 147°18′0″E

Information
- Former names: Oglivie High School New Town High School
- Type: Government comprehensive secondary school
- Established: 1 January 2022; 4 years ago (New Town and Oglivie High School official merge) 1919; 107 years ago (New Town High School) 21 July 1937; 89 years ago (Oglivie High School)
- Status: Open
- School district: Southern
- Educational authority: Department for Education, Children and Young People
- Oversight: Office of Tasmanian Assessment, Standards & Certification
- Principal: Britany Roestenburg
- Years: 7–12
- Gender: Co-Education
- Campus type: Suburban
- Houses: Panupiri; Patrula; Layna; Tiyuratina
- Colours: Yellow, pink, blue & green
- Website: www.hobartcityhigh.education.tas.edu.au

Hobart City High School is a government co-educational high school in New Town, Hobart. Hobart City High School was formed in 2022 when Ogilvie High School and New Town High School merged. The merged schools were the last of Tasmania's single-sex public schools. Hobart City High caters for approximately 1200 students from Years 7 to 12. It is administered by the Tasmanian Department for Education, Children and Young People.

Hobart City High School has two main campuses called Oglivie and New Town to recognise the previous schools. In 2022, the school's first lead principal was Deb Day. As of 2024, the current lead principal is Britany Roestenburg.

== History ==
=== Antecedent schools ===
New Town was established in 1919 as Hobart Junior Technical College as a boys' school. It rebranded as Hobart Technical High School in 1950 and settled on New Town High School in 1961.

Oglivie was established in 1937 as New Town Commercial High School as a selective co-educational school, designed for studying commerce. Three years later, it was renamed A.G. Ogilvie High School in honour of Albert Ogilvie, the Premier of Tasmania, who died in 1939.

=== Post-merger ===
The new model for Oglivie and New Town High Schools was announced in November 2020.

The draft master plan for Hobart City High School was released in March 2022 and received over $21 million in government support.

Hobart City High School is part of a partnership with Elizabeth College, called the Hobart City Partner Schools. This collaboration is part of the school's transition to co-education and may culminate in Elizabeth College joining Hobart City High to form one school with three campuses.

== Curriculum ==
Students study five core subjects, aligning with the Australian Curriculum. These include: English, Health and Physical Education, Humanities and Social Sciences (years 7 and 8), History (years 9 and 10), Mathematics and Science. From year 8, students can also choose optional subjects, like arts, technologies and work studies. Hobart City High also offer a gifted and highly-able education program.

Hobart City High School works with Big Picture Learning Australia. Big Picture is a not-for-profit company which allows students to create a personalised learning program involving internships, individual projects and mentors.

== See also ==
- List of schools in Tasmania
- Education in Tasmania
