= Montrose Bay High School =

School in Tasmania, Australia

Location
- 865 Brooker Avenue, Glenorchy; Rosetta and Goodwood, Hobart, Tasmania; Australia; 42°49′11″S 147°15′57″E

Information
- Type: Government comprehensive secondary school
- Mottoes: Connect, innovate, educate
- Established: 2010; 16 years ago
- Status: Open
- School district: Southern
- Educational authority: Department for Education, Children and Young People
- Oversight: Office of Tasmanian Assessment, Standards & Certification
- Principal: Tim Nicholas
- Teaching staff: 46.9 FTE (2019)
- Years: 7–10
- Gender: Co-educational
- Enrolment: 625 (2019)
- Campus type: Suburban
- Houses: Austin; Dowsing; Faulkner; O'Brien
- Colours: Green, blue, & orange
- Website: montrosebayhigh.tas.edu.au

Montrose Bay High School is a government co-educational comprehensive secondary school with campuses located in Rosetta and Goodwood, northern suburbs of Hobart, Tasmania, Australia. Established in 2010, the school caters for approximately 700 students from Years 7 to 10. The school is administered by the Department for Education, Children and Young People.

In 2019 student enrolments were 625. The school principal is Pieta Langham-McKay.

Montrose Bay High was formed in 2010 through a merger of Rosetta High School and Claremont High School.

== See also ==
- List of schools in Tasmania
- Education in Tasmania
