= Reece High School =

School in Devonport, Tasmania, Australia

Location
- Devonport, Tasmania; Australia; 41°11′21″S 146°21′00″E

Information
- Type: Government comprehensive secondary school
- Motto: Realising potential
- Established: 1955; 71 years ago
- Status: Open
- School district: Northern
- Educational authority: Department for Education, Children and Young People
- Oversight: Office of Tasmanian Assessment, Standards & Certification
- Principal: Thomas Murrary
- Teaching staff: 34.4 FTE (2019)
- Years: 7–12
- Gender: Co-educational
- Enrolment: 470 (2019)
- Campus type: Regional
- Website: reecehigh.education.tas.edu.au

Reece High School is a government co-educational comprehensive secondary school located in Devonport, Tasmania, Australia. Established in 1955, the school caters for approximately 450 students from Years 7 to 12 and is administered by the Department for Education, Children and Young People.

== History ==
The school was established in 1955 and was named after Eric Reece.

=== December 2000 fire ===
The old Reece High School was destroyed by a fire in December 2000. Planning and reconstruction of a new school began soon after, however during the two years of reconstruction, students from Reece High School co-located with Devonport High School, with both schools operating independently from the one campus.

=== Re-establishment in 2003 ===
Reece High School reopened its doors to students in 2003. Classrooms were equipped with power outlets, windows and toilet facilities and attempts were made to enable wireless internet access throughout the school. Of the school's A$10 million rebuild budget, a significant portion was spent on AV equipment.

The year 7 and 8 classrooms or PLAs (Primary Learning Areas) were built in clusters of four linked by walls, so as to allow interaction between classes. These walls were more soundproof than previous walls, and stopped noise between classrooms. The other home rooms in the school were of more conventional design, but more spacious and revamped to take advantage of the school's technological renovations. All rooms in the school are lit and most have windows, unlike many other Tasmanian schools.

== Awards ==
- 2003 James D. MacConnell Award from the Council of Educational Facilities Planners International for Building Design excellence.

== See also ==
- Education in Tasmania
- List of schools in Tasmania
