= Riverside High School (Launceston) =

School in Launceston, Tasmania, Australia

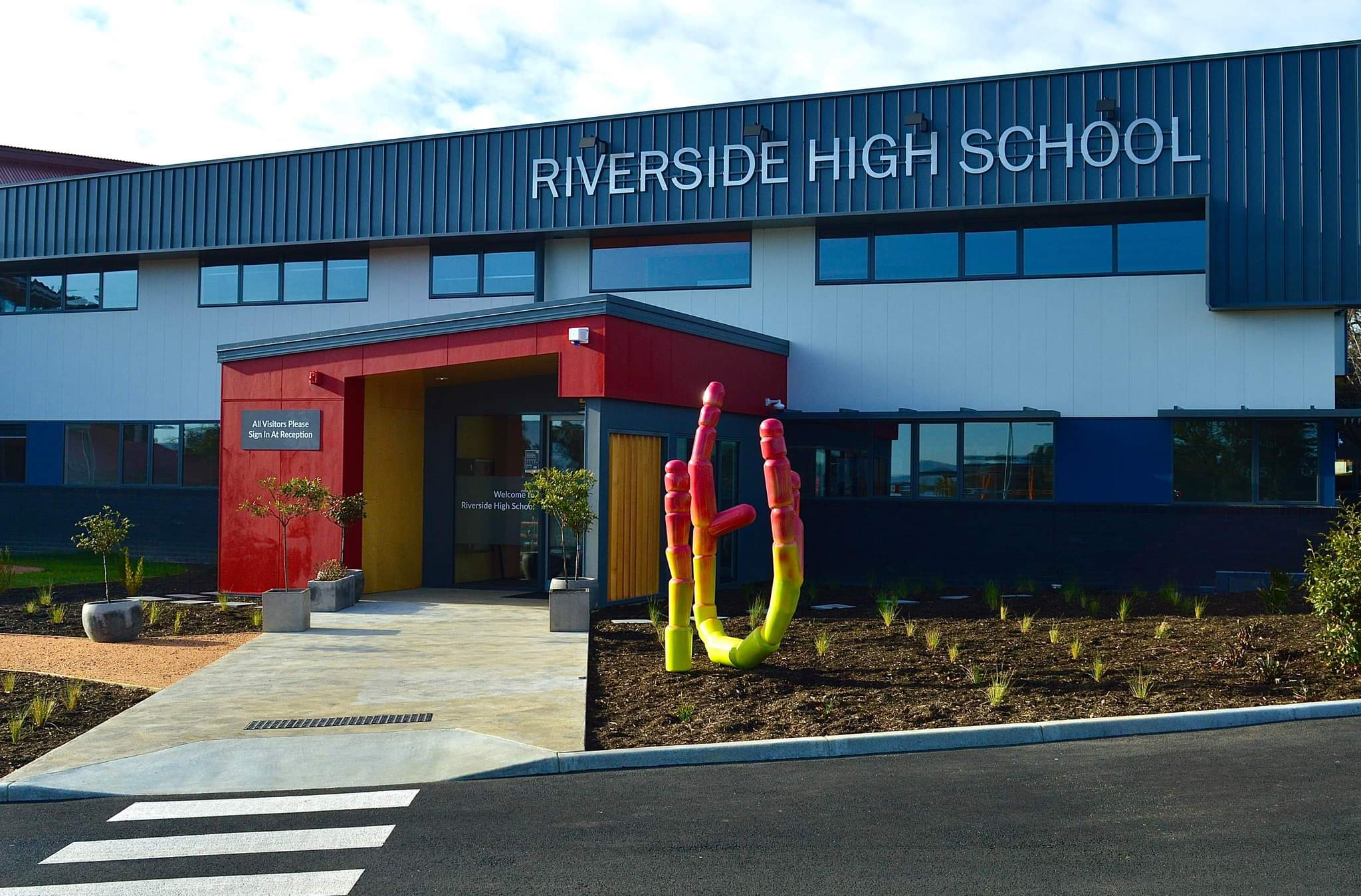
- Riverside High School, in 2020

Location
- Riverside, Launceston, Tasmania; Australia; 41°24′31″S 147°05′58″E

Information
- Type: Government comprehensive secondary school
- Motto: Latin: Quod verum meum est (All that is true is mine)
- Established: 4 February 1964; 62 years ago
- Status: Open
- School district: Northern
- Educational authority: Department for Education, Children and Young People
- Principal: Jeanna Bolton
- Teaching staff: 55.2 FTE (2022)
- Years: 7–12
- Gender: Co-educational
- Enrolment: 767 (2022)
- Campus type: Regional
- Website: riversidehigh.education.tas.edu.au

Riverside High School is a government co-educational comprehensive secondary school located in Riverside, a suburb of Launceston, Tasmania, Australia. Established in 1962, the school caters for approximately 820 students from Years 7 to 12. The school is administered by the Department for Education, Children and Young People.

In 2022 student enrolments were 767. The school principal is Jeanna Bolton.

The school's motto is Latin: Quod verum meum est, translated as "All that is true is mine".

== History ==
The Scott-Kilvert Hut in Cradle Mountain Lake St Clair National Park, Tasmania is a memorial hut dedicated to the lives of Ewen Scott and David Kilvert, a teacher and student from Riverside High School, who died due to a blizzard whilst bushwalking in 1965.

In May 2008, Riverside science teacher William Briginshaw was awarded Tasmania's Winifred Curtis Medal for his contributions to science education.

In 2019 Riverside High received an extensive $12 million dollar redevelopment which was officially opened in November 2020 by Jeremy Rockliff, Minister for Education and Training, and Tim Bullard, Secretary of Education.

== Notable alumni ==
- Rene Hidding, former Minister in the Parliament of Tasmania
- Anthony Limbrick, soccer manager
- Rachael Taylor, actress
- Jo Palmer, newsreader and member of Tasmanian Legislative Council.

== See also ==
- Education in Tasmania
- List of schools in Tasmania
