= Claremont College (Tasmania) =

Location
- Claremont, Northern Hobart, Tasmania; Australia; 42°47′43″S 147°14′59″E

Information
- Type: Government comprehensive senior college
- Established: 1990; 36 years ago
- School district: Southern
- Educational authority: Department for Education, Children and Young People
- Oversight: Office of Tasmanian Assessment, Standards & Certification
- Staff: 62.9 FTE (2023)
- Teaching staff: 35.4 FTE (2023)
- Years: 11–13
- Enrolment: 353.8 FTE (2023)
- Campus type: Suburban
- Colours: Blue and yellow
- Website: claremontcollege.education.tas.edu.au

Claremont College is a government comprehensive senior secondary school located in Claremont in the northern suburbs of Hobart, Tasmania, Australia. Established in 1990, the college caters for approximately 400 students in Years 11, 12 and optional Year 13 and is administered by the Department for Education, Children and Young People.

The college provides a full range of courses, preparing students for university, TAFE, traineeships and employment with courses delivered both on- and off-campus. The college overlooks the River Derwent, and is located approximately 15 kilometres (9.3 mi) from the Hobart central business district.

== Notable alumni ==
- Luke Butterworth, cricket player
- Dana Faletic, economist / Olympic rower
- Brett Geeves, cricket player
- Joanna Siejka, politician

== See also ==
- List of schools in Tasmania
- Education in Tasmania
