= St James Catholic College =

School in Tasmania, Australia

Coordinates: 43.163°S 147.075°E

- Cygnet, Tasmania; Australia

Information
- Type: Independent co-educational primary and secondary day school
- Motto: Let Your Light Shine
- Denomination: Roman Catholic
- Established: 1962; 64 years ago
- Principal: Joseph Sandric
- Grades: K–10
- Enrolment: c. 330
- Colours: Blue, yellow and red
- Website: www.sjcc.tas.edu.au

St James Catholic College is an independent Roman Catholic co-educational primary and secondary day school located in the Hobart suburb of Cygnet, Tasmania, Australia. The college provides a Catholic education for children from kindergarten to Year 10.

== Overview ==
In 1896, in response to the desire for Catholic education in the Cygnet area, the Sisters of St. Joseph founded St Mary's Convent School. In 1944, Lourdes Hill Agricultural College was founded by the Christian Brothers to provide secondary schooling for boys. During this time, the boys from Grade 4 were taught by the Brothers at Lourdes Hill.

In 1961, the Brothers and Sisters began to share the teaching of the secondary classes. Lourdes Hill amalgamated with St Mary's Convent School to form St. James School in 1962. The Sisters taught the lower primary boys and all the girls. In 1976, St. James School and Lourdes Hill Agricultural College became known as St. James Catholic College.

== See also ==
- List of Catholic schools in Tasmania
- Education in Tasmania
