= Huonville High School =

School in Tasmania, Australia

Location
- Huonville, Tasmania; Australia; 43°01′27″S 147°02′43″E

Information
- Type: Government comprehensive secondary school
- Motto: Forward honourably
- Established: 1940; 86 years ago as Huonville Area School
- Status: Open
- School district: Southern
- Educational authority: Department for Education, Children and Young People
- Oversight: Office of Tasmanian Assessment, Standards & Certification
- Principal: Janelle Reeves
- Teaching staff: 33.3 FTE (2019)
- Years: 7–12
- Gender: Co-educational
- Enrolment: 408 (2019)
- Campus type: Regional
- Houses: Hakea; Banksia; Grevillia
- Colours: Red, white and blue
- Website: huonvillehigh.education.tas.edu.au

Huonville High School is a government co-educational comprehensive secondary school located in Huonville, a town to the south-west of Hobart, Tasmania, Australia. Established in 1940, the school caters for approximately 400 students from Years 7 to 12. The Department for Education, Children and Young People administers the school.

In 2015, Huonville High School partnered with Dover District High School to offer year 11 courses, making them one of the first Government high schools to go to year 11. Students undertake courses at the Advanced Learning Centre or the Huon Valley Trade Training Centre.

== Description ==
The school was established in 1940 as the Huonville Area School for £12,000-£16,000. The official opening was held a year later on Friday, 31 October 1941. The school catered to students from the Huonville, Ranelagh, Lucaston, Mountain River, Franklin, and Crabtree. At that time, around half of the students were transported to the school by bus. In addition to the core curriculum, the school taught sex-segregated subjects, with the boys learning trades like metal- and woodwork, agriculture, horticulture, and barn work, while the girls were taught cookery, housework, needlework, and arts and crafts. In July 1941, the school headmaster reported that 462 students were enrolled at the school and that they had a 91% attendance rate.

In 2020, the school reported 393 total enrolments, with 21% identifying as Aboriginal or Torres Strait Islander and 2% of students with a language background other than English.

The school uniform is compulsory and consists mainly of a navy hooded jumper and a navy and white polo shirt. The exceptions for this policy are the grade 10 hoodies, the student leaders' tops, any old Huonville High School uniform item with the school logo. Also in the uniform are navy softshell jackets, v-neck jumpers, shorts, trousers and skirts. There is a summer dress for girls, a white button-up shirt, and a bucket hat available.

Huonville High School offers a range of Vocational Education and Training (VET) and Tasmanian Assessment, Standards and Certification (TASC) accredited courses for years 11 and 12 students at the Huon Valley Trade Training Centre and their Advanced Learning Centre (ALC). These courses are designed to help students achieve their Tasmanian Certificate of Education (TCE), Australian Tertiary Admission Rank (ATAR) and/or a vocational certificate. In 2019, 34 students were enrolled in years 11 and 12 at Huonville High School. Of that, 56% of students achieved a TCE and 6% achieved at ATAR. TASC also reports that 81% of students from year 10 continued to study in year 11 and 63% directly continued into year 12.

In 2017, Huonville High School competed with 14 other schools worldwide for the Global High Schools Zayed Future Energy Prize. The school sent their environmental team to Abu Dhabi to receive the award. After the event, the school's environmental group became known as the Zayed Huon Energy Futures Team (Zayed HEFT). This prize rewarded the school with a cheque for USD 130,000 (AUD 133,000). With the money from the award, the Zayed Huon Energy Futures Team installed 125 solar panels (36 kilowatts) onto Huonville High School. They also refurbished an unused building in the school to turn it into the Huon Future Energy Hub. The Energy Hub is open to the public as an example of renewable energy and serves as a base for the Zayed Team's weekly meetings.

The Zayed Team consists of students from the high school who volunteer their time and energy to create and organise events with climate change and sustainability in mind. According to the Zayed HEFT website, students at Huonville High School said climate change was their number one concern.

In May 2021, Huonville High School's Health and Physical Education team was rewarded the Dorothies encouragement award for LGBT+ inclusive practices in educational institutions.

== See also ==
- Education in Tasmania
- List of schools in Tasmania
