= Rose Bay High School =

- Rose Bay High School in 2007

Location
- Kaoota Road, Lindisfarne; Rose Bay, Hobart, Tasmania; Australia; 42°51′43″S 147°21′29″E

Information
- Type: Government comprehensive secondary school
- Established: 1961; 65 years ago
- Status: Open
- School district: Southern
- Educational authority: Department for Education, Children and Young People
- Oversight: Office of Tasmanian Assessment, Standards & Certification
- Principal: Joel Doyle
- Teaching staff: 47.5 FTE (2019)
- Years: 7–12
- Gender: Co-educational
- Enrolment: 678 (2020)
- Campus type: Suburban
- Colours: Blue, red, and white
- Website: rosebayhigh.education.tas.edu.au

Rose Bay High School is a government co-educational comprehensive secondary school located in Rose Bay, a suburb of Hobart, Tasmania, Australia. Established in 1961, the school caters for approximately 650 students from Years 7 to 12. The school is administered by the Department for Education, Children and Young People.

In 2020, student enrolments were 678. The school principal is Joel Doyle.

The school has views of the River Derwent, Mount Wellington, the city of Hobart, and the Tasman Bridge.

== History ==
=== Construction ===
In 1960, a deputation from the Clarence High School P & F Association strongly emphasised the urgent need for immediate action in the provision of additional high school accommodation on the Eastern Shore. With the co-operation of the Housing Department and the Clarence Commission negotiations were rapidly completed for the procurement of the magnificent site on which the school now stands. On 23 June 1960, the Rose Bay High School Advisory Council was formed through the P & F Associations of the three Primary Schools immediately concerned: Lindisfarne North, Lindisfarne and Montagu Bay.

On 29 July 1960, a tender was let for the first unit of the Rose Bay High School at a contract price of £43,000. The first stage of the new building consisted of eight classrooms, two of which were used for practical activities with some provision for both administrative and staff requirements.

=== Redevelopment ===
2009 saw the start of the school's second redevelopment stage to which A$4.78 million was allocated. This complemented the A$1.3 million refurbishment which was completed in 2005 and provide 'state of the art facilities' in most learning areas. The first phase began in November 2009, with the demolition of the old student toilet block at the end of B Block. The school's new Dance/Drama suite was constructed on this site.

In March 2017, the school was one of eighteen high schools expanded to cover Years 11 and 12.

Rose Bay High School gained funding from the Australian Government's Building the Education Revolution Program to build a Language Centre to provide modern facilities for the teaching of languages other than English.

== Notable past students ==
- Robert Shaw
- Jeremy Howe

== See also ==
- List of schools in Tasmania
- Education in Tasmania
