= New Norfolk High School =

School in Tasmania, Australia

Location
- 101 Blair Street; New Norfolk, Tasmania; Australia; 42°47′17″S 147°03′40″E

Information
- Type: Government comprehensive secondary school
- Motto: Straightforward and always honest
- Status: Open
- School district: Southern
- Educational authority: Department for Education, Children and Young People
- Oversight: Office of Tasmanian Assessment, Standards & Certification
- Principal: Stewart Lord
- Teaching staff: 27.1 FTE (2019)
- Years: 7–12
- Gender: Co-educational
- Enrolment: 314 (2019)
- Campus type: Regional
- Houses: Derwent; Russell; Faulkner
- Colours: Maroon, light blue, dark blue & white
- Website: newnorfolkhigh.education.tas.edu.au

New Norfolk High School is a government co-educational comprehensive secondary school located in New Norfolk, Tasmania, Australia. The school caters for approximately 350 students from Years 7 to 12 and is administered by the Department for Education, Children and Young People.

In 2019 student enrolments were 314. The school principal is Adam Potito.

== See also ==
- List of schools in Tasmania
- Education in Tasmania
