= Sorell School =

Location
- 41 Gordon Street; Sorell, Hobart, Tasmania; Australia; 42°47′10″S 147°33′40″E

Information
- Type: Government comprehensive primary and secondary school
- Motto: Respecting our past, creating our future
- Established: 1821; 205 years ago
- Status: open
- School district: Southern
- Educational authority: Department for Education, Children and Young People
- Oversight: Office of Tasmanian Assessment, Standards & Certification
- Principal: Xavier R. Brown
- Teaching staff: 64.0 FTE (2019)
- Years: K–12
- Gender: Co-educational
- Enrolment: 855 (2019)
- Campus type: Suburban
- Houses: 🟨 Davis 🟦 Bridges 🟥 Hart
- Colour: 🟦⬛️⬜️
- Website: sorell.education.tas.edu.au

Sorell School is a government co-educational comprehensive primary and secondary school located in Sorell, a suburb of Hobart, Tasmania, Australia. Established in 1821, the school caters for approximately 900 students from Years K to 12. The school is administered by the Department for Education, Children and Young People.

In 2019 student enrolments were 855. The school principal is Xavier R. Brown.

In March 2017, the school was one of eighteen high schools that were expanded to cover Years 11 and 12.

Sorell School is the oldest continually operating public school in Australia.

== See also ==
- List of schools in Tasmania
- Education in Tasmania
