= Burnie High School =

School in Tasmania, Australia

Location
- Fidler Street; Cooee, Burnie, Tasmania; Australia; 41°02′31″S 145°52′08″E

Information
- Type: Government comprehensive secondary school
- Motto: Latin: Prorsum et Semper Honeste
- Established: 1916
- Status: Open
- School district: Northern
- Educational authority: Department for Education, Children and Young People
- Oversight: Office of Tasmanian Assessment, Standards & Certification
- Principal: James Thompson
- Teaching staff: 37.3 FTE (2019)
- Years: 7–10
- Gender: Co-educational
- Enrolment: 567 (2019)
- Campus type: Regional
- Colours: Green, gold, and red
- Website: burniehigh.education.tas.edu.au

Burnie High School is a government comprehensive secondary school for boys and girls located in Cooee, a suburb of Burnie, Tasmania, Australia. Established in 1916, the school caters for approximately 600 students from Years 7 to 10. The college is administered by the Department for Education, Children and Young People.

In 2019 student enrolments were 567. The school principal is James Thompson.

== Facilities ==
In April 2007, the old, original Burnie High School building was gutted by fire. The old school had been built in 1929 and following the fire, many of its remains had to be demolished for safety reasons. The building had been due to become the new home of the Creative Paper company and the new Burnie Visitor Centre. Instead a new building was built on the site in the years following the fire.

Burnie High School is located behind Cooee Primary School in Fidler Street, Cooee. Other high schools located in the area are Parklands Wynyard High School and Marist Regional College.

In March 2017, the school was one of eighteen high schools expanded to cover Years 11 and 12.

== Productions ==
Every second year Burnie High School puts on a production. 2007's production was Gumshoe: The Spy Musical, which was also performed by Burnie High School in 1997. Other past musical productions undertaken by the school include: How the West was Warped, Sheik Rattle 'n' Roll, Zombied, Jungle Fantasy and Bats. The most recent Burnie High Production to date is 2025's "Once Upon a Time" which ran from September 11-20th 2025 at the Burnie Arts Centre.

== Notable alumni ==
- Ron Cornish – former politician who represented Braddon in the Tasmanian House of Assembly for the Liberals
- Brady Grey – Australian rules footballer
- Bryan Green – politician who represented Braddon in the Tasmanian House of Assembly for Labor
- Alastair Lynch – Australian rules footballer for Fitzroy, the Brisbane Bears, and Brisbane Lions
- Frank Neasey – Puisne Judge of the Supreme Court of Tasmania
- Ian Rist – sports shooter who won the Australian and Commonwealth Clay Target Shooting championship
- Zima Anderson, actress

== See also ==
- List of schools in Tasmania
- Education in Tasmania
