= Ulverstone Secondary College =

School in Tasmania, Australia

Location
- 38 Leven Street; Ulverstone, Tasmania; Australia; 41°09′43″S 146°10′16″E

Information
- Type: Government comprehensive secondary school
- Motto: Care, Create, Achieve
- Established: 9 February 1953; 73 years ago
- Status: Open
- School district: Northern
- Educational authority: Department for Education, Children and Young People
- Oversight: Office of Tasmanian Assessment, Standards & Certification
- Principal: Simon Dent
- Teaching staff: 45.8 FTE (2019)
- Years: 7–12
- Enrolment: 550 (2023)
- Campus type: Regional urban area
- Colours: Maroon and blue
- Website: ulverstonesc.education.tas.edu.au

Ulverstone Secondary College (formerally Ulverstone High School) is a government comprehensive secondary school located in Ulverstone, in the Central Coast region of Tasmania, Australia. Established in 1953, the school caters for approximately 600 students from Years 7 to 12. The college is administered by the Department for Education, Children and Young People.

In 2023 student enrolments were 550. The college principal is Simon Dent. The school is one of the few high schools in Tasmania to cater for hearing impaired students.

== History ==
The school was established in 1953 as it was to help the surrounding communities gain into high school. In March 2015, the school received an international entry as a collaborative team in the F1 in Schools competition held in Singapore. In March 2017, the school was one of eighteen high schools to be expanded to cover Years 11 and 12. In 2019 Ulverstone High School was officially renamed Ulverstone Secondary College to reflect the new 11/12 offering.

== See also ==
- Education in Tasmania
- List of schools in Tasmania
