= List of schools in Tasmania =

Schools in the Tasmanian public education system include 123 primary schools (Kindergarten to Grade 6), 54 high schools (Grade 7 to 12), and 8 colleges (Grade 11 and 12). The public education system is run by the Department for Education, Children and Young People.

Of the high schools, 26 are district (or district high) schools, where in rural areas the primary and high schools are located on a single campus. There are also 6 support (or special) schools, 4 early learning centres, 1 infant school and distance education.

The largest public education institute in Tasmania is the University of Tasmania, with major campuses at Newnham in Launceston and Sandy Bay in Hobart, along with a north-west centre in Burnie.

There are many non-government schools and colleges in Tasmania. Non-government schools generally have a religious affiliation, although the strength varies between schools. There are 70 registered non-government schools in Tasmania.

== Government schools ==
=== Secondary schools ===
| Name | Suburb | Opened | Notes |
|---|---|---|---|
| Bayview Secondary College | Rokeby | 1980 | Formerly Rokeby High School |
| Brooks High School | Rocherlea | 1948 | |
| Burnie High School | Cooee | 1916 | |
| Claremont College | Claremont | 1990 | Formerly Claremont Education Park |
| Clarence High School | Bellerive | 1959 | |
| Cosgrove High School | Glenorchy | 1951 | |
| Deloraine High School | Deloraine | 1952 | |
| Devonport High School | Devonport | 1916 | |
| Don College | Devonport | 1976 | |
| Elizabeth College | North Hobart | 1911 | |
| Exeter High School | Exeter | 1985 | |
| Hellyer College | Burnie | 1976 | |
| Hobart City High School | New Town | 2022 | Amalgamation of New Town High School and Ogilvie High School |
| Hobart College | Mount Nelson | 1913 | |
| Huonville High School | Huonville | 1940 | |
| Jordan River Learning Federation – Senior School | Bridgewater | 2011 | |
| Kings Meadows High School | Kings Meadows | 1960 | |
| Kingston High School | Kingston | 1972 | |
| Latrobe High School | Latrobe | 1964 | |
| Launceston Big Picture School | Invermay | 2016 | |
| Launceston College | Launceston | 1913 | |
| Montrose Bay High School | Rosetta and Goodwood | 2010 | |
| New Norfolk High School | New Norfolk | 1954 | |
| Newstead College | Launceston | 1997 | |
| Parklands High School | Romaine | 1958 | |
| Prospect High School | Prospect | 1965 | |
| Queechy High School | Norwood | 1957 | |
| Reece High School | Devonport | 1955 | |
| Riverside High School | Riverside | 1962 | |
| Rose Bay High School | Rose Bay | 1961 | |
| Rosny College | Rosny Park | 1973 | |
| Scottsdale High School | Scottsdale | 1922 | |
| Smithton High School | Smithton | 1938 | |
| Taroona High School | Taroona | 1958 | |
| Ulverstone Secondary College | Ulverstone | 1953 | |
| Wynyard High School | Wynyard | 1960 | |

=== District schools ===
| Name | Suburb | Opened | Notes |
|---|---|---|---|
| Bothwell District High School | Bothwell | 1833 | |
| Bruny Island District School | Alonnah | 1949 | |
| Campania District High School | Campania | 1886 | |
| Campbell Town District High School | Campbell Town | | |
| Cape Barren Island School | Cape Barren Island | 1890 | |
| Cressy District High School | Cressy | 1840 | |
| Dover District High School | Dover | 1919 | |
| Flinders Island District High School | Whitemark | | |
| Glenora District High School | Glenora | 1848 | |
| King Island District High School | Currie | | |
| Lilydale District High School | Lilydale | 1875 | |
| Mountain Heights School | Queenstown | 1896 | |
| Oatlands District High School | Oatlands | 1833 | |
| Ouse District School | Ouse | 1847 | |
| Penguin District School | Penguin | 2013 | |
| Port Dalrymple School | George Town | 1999 | Merger of George Town Primary School and George Town High School. |
| Rosebery District High School | Rosebery | 1899 | |
| Sheffield School | Sheffield | 1878 | |
| Sorell School | Sorell | 1821 | |
| St Helens District High School | St Helens | 1874 | |
| St Marys District High School | St Marys | 1857 | |
| Tasman District High School | Nubeena | | |
| Triabunna District High School | Triabunna | 1863 | |
| Winnaleah District High School | Winnaleah | | |
| Woodbridge School | Woodbridge | 1871 | |
| Yolla District School | Yolla | 1904 | |

=== Primary and infant schools ===
| Name | Suburb | Opened | Notes |
|---|---|---|---|
| Albuera Street Primary School | Hobart | 1847 | |
| Andrews Creek Primary School | Wesley Vale | 2013 | Merger of Moriarty and Wesley Vale Primary Schools |
| Austins Ferry Primary School | Claremont | 2011 | |
| Bagdad Primary School | Bagdad | 1867 | |
| Beaconsfield Primary School | Beaconsfield | 1883 | |
| Bellerive Primary School | Bellerive | 1842 | |
| Bicheno Primary School | Bicheno | | |
| Blackmans Bay Primary School | Blackmans Bay | | |
| Boat Harbour Primary School | Boat Harbour | 1888 | |
| Bowen Road Primary School | Moonah | 1929 | |
| Bracknell Primary School | Bracknell | 1866 | |
| Bridport Primary School | Bridport | | |
| Brighton Primary School | Brighton | 1952 | |
| Burnie Primary School | Park Grove | 1852 | |
| Cambridge Primary School | Cambridge | 1864 | |
| Campbell Street Primary School | North Hobart | 1926 | |
| Clarendon Vale Primary School | Clarendon Vale | | |
| Collinsvale Primary School | Collinsvale | 1848 | |
| Cooee Primary School | Cooee | 1915 | |
| Cygnet Primary School | Cygnet | | |
| Deloraine Primary School | Deloraine | 1847 | |
| Devonport Primary School | Devonport | 1886 | |
| Dodges Ferry Primary School | Dodges Ferry | 1988 | |
| Dunalley Primary School | Dunalley | 1885 | |
| East Derwent Primary School | Bridgewater | 2009 | Formed from the merger of Bridgewater Primary School and Green Point Primary School. Situated on the site of the old Green Point campus. |
| East Devonport Primary School | East Devonport | 1856 | |
| East Launceston Primary School | East Launceston | 1908 | |
| East Tamar Primary School | Mayfield | | |
| East Ulverstone Primary School | Ulverstone | | |
| Edith Creek Primary School | Edith Creek | 1954 | |
| Evandale Primary School | Evandale | 1834 | |
| Exeter Primary School | Exeter | 1909 | |
| Fairview Primary School | New Norfolk | 1957 | Known as New Norfolk North Primary School from 1957 until 1969. |
| Forest Primary School | Forest | 1880 | |
| Forth Primary School | Forth | 1867 | |
| Franklin Primary School | Franklin | 1860 | |
| Gagebrook Primary School | Gagebrook | | Part of The Jordan River Learning Federation (JRLF) |
| Geeveston Primary School | Geeveston | 1880 | |
| Glen Dhu Primary School | South Launceston | 1895 | |
| Glen Huon Primary School | Glen Huon | 1880 | |
| Glenorchy Primary School | Glenorchy | 1839 | |
| Goodwood Primary School | Derwent Park | 1954 | |
| Goulburn Street Primary School | West Hobart | 1887 | |
| Hagley Farm Primary School | Hagley | 1932 | |
| Havenview Primary School | Havenview | 1963 | |
| Herdsmans Cove Primary School | Herdsmans Cove | 1979 | Part of The Jordan River Learning Federation (JRLF) |
| Hillcrest Primary School | Devonport | | |
| Howrah Primary School | Howrah | 1961 | |
| Huonville Primary School | Huonville | | |
| Illawarra Primary School | Blackmans Bay | | |
| Invermay Primary School | Invermay | 1889 | |
| Kempton Primary School | Kempton | 1861 | |
| Kingston Primary School | Kingston | 1860 | |
| Lansdowne Crescent Primary School | West Hobart | 1916 | |
| Latrobe Primary School | Latrobe | 1870 | |
| Lauderdale Primary School | Lauderdale | 1965 | |
| Lenah Valley Primary School | Lenah Valley | | |
| Lindisfarne North Primary School | Geilston Bay | 1895 | |
| Lindisfarne Primary School | Lindisfarne | 1895 | |
| Longford Primary School | Longford | 1830 | |
| Margate Primary School | Margate | 1919 | |
| Miandetta Primary School | Miandetta | 1970 | |
| Mole Creek Primary School | Mole Creek | 1878 | |
| Molesworth Primary School | Molesworth | 1881 | |
| Montagu Bay Primary School | Montagu Bay | 1935 | |
| Montello Primary School | Montello | | |
| Moonah Primary School | Derwent Park | 1911 | |
| Mount Nelson Primary School | Mount Nelson | | |
| Mount Stuart Primary School | Mount Stuart | 1957 | |
| Mowbray Heights Primary School | Mowbray | 1927 | |
| Natone Primary School | Natone | 1957 | |
| New Norfolk Primary School | New Norfolk | 1860s | |
| New Town Primary School | New Town | 1860 | |
| Nixon Street Primary School | Devonport | 1959 | |
| Norwood Primary School | Norwood | | |
| Orford Primary School | Orford | 1869 | |
| Perth Primary School | Perth | 1833 | |
| Port Sorell Primary School | Port Sorell | 2013 | |
| Princes Street Primary School | Sandy Bay | 1922 | |
| Punchbowl Primary School | Newstead | | |
| Ravenswood Heights Primary School | Ravenswood | 1996 | |
| Redpa Primary School | Redpa | | |
| Riana Primary School | Riana | 1954 | |
| Richmond Primary School | Richmond | 1834 | |
| Ridgley Primary School | Ridgley | 1905 | |
| Ringarooma Primary School | Ringarooma | 1880 | |
| Risdon Vale Primary School | Risdon Vale | 1961 | |
| Riverside Primary School | Riverside | | |
| Rokeby Primary School | Rokeby | | |
| Romaine Park Primary School | Burnie | 2011 | |
| Rosetta Primary School | Rosetta | 1960 | |
| Sandy Bay Infant School | Sandy Bay | 1888 | |
| Sassafras Primary School | Sassafras | 1871 | |
| Scottsdale Primary School | Scottsdale | 1868 | |
| Smithton Primary School | Smithton | 1874 | |
| Snug Primary School | Snug | | |
| Somerset Primary School | Somerset | 1865 | |
| South Arm Primary School | South Arm | | |
| South George Town Primary School | George Town | 1967 | |
| South Hobart Primary School | South Hobart | 1847 | |
| Sprent Primary School | Sprent | 1950 | |
| Spreyton Primary School | Spreyton | 1890 | |
| Springfield Gardens Primary School | West Moonah | 1960 | |
| St Leonards Primary School | St Leonards | 1862 | |
| Stanley Primary School | Stanley | 1854 | |
| Strahan Primary School | Strahan | 1890 | |
| Summerdale Primary School | Summerhill | 1913 | |
| Swansea Primary School | Swansea | 1860 | |
| Table Cape Primary School | Wynyard | 1856 | Formerly Wynyard Primary School |
| Taroona Primary School | Taroona | 1915 | |
| Trevallyn Primary School | Launceston | 1916 | |
| Ulverstone Primary School | Ulverstone | 1870 | |
| Waimea Heights Primary School | Sandy Bay | 1953 | |
| Warrane Primary School | Warrane | | |
| Waverley Primary School | Waverley | 1956 | |
| West Launceston Primary School | West Launceston | | |
| West Ulverstone Primary School | West Ulverstone | 1959 | |
| Westbury Primary School | Westbury | 1839 | |
| Westerway Primary School | Westerway | 1920 | |
| Wilmot Primary School | Wilmot | | |
| Windermere Primary School | Claremont | 2010 | |
| Youngtown Primary School | Youngtown | 1887 | |
| Zeehan Primary School | Zeehan | 1872 | |

=== Support schools ===
| Name | Suburb | Opened | Notes |
|---|---|---|---|
| Ashley School | Deloraine | | |
| Northern Support School – Newstead Heights campus | Ravenswood | | |
| Northern Support School – St Georges campus | Ravenswood | | |
| North-Western Support School – Burnie | South Burnie | | |
| North-Western Support School – Devonport | Devonport | | |
| Southern Support School | Howrah | 1969 | Formerly Hazelwood School |

=== Early learning ===
- Early Learning Tasmania Burnie
- Early Learning Tasmania Devonport
- Early Learning Tasmania Hobart
- Early Learning Tasmania Launceston

== Non-government ==
=== Catholic schools ===
| Name | Suburb | M/F/Co-ed | Opened | Notes |
|---|---|---|---|---|
| Corpus Christi School | Bellerive | Co-ed | 1936 | |
| Dominic College | Glenorchy | Co-ed | 1973 | |
| Guilford Young College | Hobart and Glenorchy | Co-ed | 1995 | |
| Holy Rosary School | Claremont | Co-ed | 1961 | |
| Immaculate Heart of Mary Catholic School | Lenah Valley | Co-ed | 1961 | |
| John Paul II School | Rokeby | Co-ed | 1983 | |
| Larmenier Primary School | St Leonards | Co-ed | 1961 | |
| MacKillop College | Mornington | Co-ed | 1994 | |
| Marist Regional College | Burnie | Co-ed | 1972 | |
| Mount Carmel College | Sandy Bay | F | 1942 | |
| Our Lady of Lourdes School | Devonport | Co-ed | 1891 | |
| Our Lady of Mercy School | Deloraine | Co-ed | 1895 | |
| Sacred Heart College | New Town | Co-ed | 1888 | |
| Sacred Heart School | Geeveston | Co-ed | 1938 | |
| Sacred Heart School | Launceston | Co-ed | 1872 | |
| Sacred Heart School | Ulverstone | Co-ed | 1889 | |
| St Aloysius Catholic College | Kingston Beach and Huntingfield | Co-ed | 1960 | |
| St Anthony's School | Riverside | Co-ed | 1958 | |
| St Brendan-Shaw College | Devonport | Co-ed | 1981 | |
| St Brigid's School | New Norfolk | Co-ed | 1926 | |
| St Brigid's School | Wynyard | Co-ed | 1923 | |
| St Cuthbert's School | Lindisfarne | Co-ed | 1938 | |
| St Finn Barr's Catholic School | Invermay | Co-ed | 1894 | |
| St Francis Flexible Learning Centre | Chigwell | Co-ed | | Alternative |
| St James' College | Cygnet | Co-ed | 1962 | |
| St John's School | Richmond | Co-ed | 1843 | |
| St Joseph's School | Queenstown | Co-ed | 1899 | |
| St Joseph's School | Rosebery | Co-ed | 1958 | |
| St Mary's College | Hobart | F | 1868 | |
| St Patrick's College | Prospect | Co-ed | 1918 | |
| St Patrick's School | Latrobe | Co-ed | 1887 | |
| St Paul's School | Bridgewater | Co-ed | 1984 | |
| St Peter Chanel Catholic School | Smithton | Co-ed | 1979 | |
| St Therese's School | Moonah | Co-ed | 1931 | |
| St Thomas More's School | Newstead | Co-ed | 1938 | |
| St Virgil's College | Hobart and Austins Ferry | M | 1911 | |
| Star of the Sea College | George Town | Co-ed | 1957 | |
| Stella Maris School | Burnie | Co-ed | 1862 | |

=== Independent schools ===
| Name | Suburb | M/F/Co-ed | Category | Opened | Notes |
|---|---|---|---|---|---|
| Australian Christian College | Burnie, Launceston and Hobart | Co-ed | Christian | 1981 | Formerly Seabrook Christian School |
| Calvin Christian School | Kingston | Co-ed | Christian | 1962 | |
| Channel Christian School | Margate | Co-ed | Christian | 1988 | |
| Circular Head Christian School | Smithton | Co-ed | Christian | 1985 | |
| The Cottage School | Bellerive | Co-ed | Non-denominational | 1975 | |
| Devonport Christian School | Devonport | Co-ed | Christian | 1992 | |
| Eastside Lutheran College | Warrane | Co-ed | Lutheran | 1982 | |
| Emmanuel Christian School | Rokeby | Co-ed | Christian | 1979 | |
| Fahan School | Sandy Bay | F | Non-denominational | 1935 | |
| The Friends' School | North Hobart | Co-ed | Quaker | 1887 | |
| Geneva Christian College | Latrobe | Co-ed | Christian | 1967 | |
| Giant Steps Tasmania | Deloraine | Co-ed | For students with a diagnosis of Autism | | |
| Hilliard Christian School | Moonah | Co-ed | Adventist | 1900 | |
| The Hutchins School | Sandy Bay | M | Anglican | 1846 | |
| Indie School | Glenorchy and Devonport | Co-ed | Alternative | | |
| John Calvin School | Launceston | Co-ed | Christian | 1965 | |
| Lambert School | North Hobart | Co-ed | Non-denominational | 1975 | |
| Launceston Christian School | Riverside | Co-ed | Christian | 1976 | |
| Launceston Church Grammar School | Mowbray | Co-ed | Anglican | 1846 | |
| The Launceston Preparatory School | Launceston | Co-ed | Non-denominational | | |
| Leighland Christian School | Ulverstone | Co-ed | Christian | 1976 | |
| Newstead Christian School | Newstead | Co-ed | Christian | 1995 | |
| North West Christian School | Penguin | Co-ed | Adventist | 1975 | |
| Northern Christian School | Bridgewater | Co-ed | Christian | 1993 | |
| OneSchool Global | Claremont and Kings Meadows | Co-ed | Exclusive Brethren | 1993 | Formerly Oakwood School |
| Peregrine School | Nicholls Rivulet | Co-ed | Non-denominational | 2000 | |
| Scotch Oakburn College | Launceston | Co-ed | Uniting | 1979 | |
| Southern Christian College | Kingston | Co-ed | Christian | 1986 | |
| St Michael's Collegiate School | Hobart | F | Anglican | 1892 | |
| Tamar Valley Steiner School | Launceston | Co-ed | Steiner | 2016 | |
| Tarremah Steiner School | Huntingfield | Co-ed | Steiner | 1988 | |

== Closed ==
=== Government schools ===
| Name | Suburb | Type | Opened | Closed | Notes |
|---|---|---|---|---|---|
| Abbotsfield Primary School | Claremont | Primary | 1964 | 2009 | Merged into Austins Ferry Primary School and Windermere Primary School |
| Acton Primary School | Acton | Primary | | 2020 | |
| Avoca Primary School | Avoca | Primary | 1849 | 2010 | Merged into Romaine Primary School |
| Branxholm Primary School | Branxholm | Primary | | 2011 | Merged into Winnaleah District High School |
| Brent Street Primary School | Glenorchy | Primary | 1980 | 2009 | Merged with Glenorchy Primary School |
| Bridgewater High School | Bridgewater | High | 1977 | 2011 | merged into Jordan River Learning Federation |
| Bridgewater Primary School | Bridgewater | Primary | 1891 | 2010 | Merged into East Derwent Primary School and Greenpoint Primary School |
| Brooklyn Primary School | Brooklyn | Primary | | 2011 | Merged into Romaine Primary School |
| Claremont High School | Claremont | High | 1961 | 2010 | Merged into Montrose Bay High School |
| Claremont Primary School | Claremont | Primary | 1924 | 2009 | Merged into Austins Ferry Primary School and Windermere Primary School |
| Elizabeth St School | North Hobart | Primary | 1890 | 1968 | Site became Elizabeth College |
| Fingal Primary School | Fingal | Primary | 1856 | | Became a campus of Campus of St Marys District High School |
| Geilston Bay High School | Geilston Bay | High | 1972 | 2013 | Lindisfarne North Primary School moved on to site in 2015. |
| Hazlewood School | Moonah | Special | 1996 | 2010s | Moved to the Site of the former Wentworth school at Howrah and renamed "Southern Support School" |
| Inglis Primary School | Wynyard | Primary | 1856 | 2009 | Was renamed to Table Cape Primary School (Bowick Street Campus) in 1998 |
| Levendale Primary School | Levendale | Primary | | 2018 | Now used as Levendale Community Centre |
| Mayfield Primary School | Mayfield | Primary | | 2013 | Merged into East Tamar Primary School |
| Meander Primary School | Meander | Primary | 1891 | 2014 | |
| Mornington Primary School | Mornington | Primary | | 1992 | Campus now Mackillop College |
| Mt Faulkener Primary School | Chigwell | Primary | 1958 | 2010 | Formerly Chigwell Primary School, Merged into Austins Ferry Primary School and Windermere Primary School |
| Ogilvie High School | New Town | High | 1937 | 2022 | Merged into Hobart City High School |
| Newtown High School | New Town | High | 1919 | 2022 | Merged into Hobart City High School |
| Penguin High School | Penguin | High | | 2013 | Merged into Penguin District School |
| Penguin Primary School | Penguin | Primary | 1869 | 2013 | Merged into Penguin District School |
| Paloona State School | Paloona | | | 1929 | Closed in 1929 due to poor attendance caused by extensive bad weather. From 1930 students attended Melrose State School |
| Ravenswood High School | Ravenswood | High | | 1997 | |
| Rocherlea Primary School | Rocherlea | Primary | | 2013 | Merged into East Tamar Primary School |
| Roseneath Primary School | Claremont | Primary | 1970 | 2009 | Merged into Austins Ferry Primary School and Windermere Primary School |
| Rosetta High School | Rosetta | High | 1965 | 2010 | Merged into Montrose Bay High School |
| Upper Burnie Primary School | Upper Burnie | Primary | | 2010 | Merged into Romaine Primary School |
| Waratah Primary School | Waratah | Primary | | 2009 | Merged with Ridgley Primary School |
| West Somerset Primary School | Somerset | Primary | | | Merged with Somerset Primary School and remained in the same place, While Somerset Primary closed its other site in 2010. |

=== Non-government schools ===
| Name | Suburb | Category | Opened | Closed | Notes |
|---|---|---|---|---|---|
| Broadland House, Church of England Girls' Grammar School | Launceston | Anglican Girls | 1860 | 1982 | now part of Launceston Church Grammar School |
| Clemes College | New Town | Quaker | 1900 | 1946 | Now part of The Friends' School |
| Capstone College | Poatina | | 2016 | 2022 | Alternative School |
| Herrick Presbyterian Covenant School | Herrick | Presbyterian | | 2015 | |
| Holy Name College | Glenorchy | Catholic Girls | 1964 | 1973 | Merged into Dominic College |
| Horton College | Ross | Methodist Boys | 1852 | 1893 | Demolished; parts used for The Hutchins School and Scotch Oakburn College |
| Launceston Steiner School | Launceston | Steiner | | 2000s | |
| Lourdes Hill College | Cygnet | Catholic Boys | 1944 | 1962 | Now part of St James Catholic College |
| Marian College | Launceston | Catholic Girls | 1978 | 1984 | Merger of Sacred Heart and St Thomas More's; now part of St Patrick's College |
| Marist College | Burnie | Catholic Boys | 1959 | 1972 | Merged into Marist Regional College |
| Methodist Ladies College/Oakburn College | Launceston | Methodist | 1886 | 1979 | Now part of Scotch Oakburn College |
| Our Lady Help of Christians School | Launceston | Catholic | 1961 | 1988 | Now part of St Finn Barr's Catholic Primary School |
| Sacred Heart College | Launceston | Catholic Girls | 1872 | 1978 | Merged into St Patrick's College and Sacred Heart School, Launceston |
| Savio College | Glenorchy | Catholic Boys | 1946 | 1973 | Merged into Dominic College |
| Scotch College | Launceston | Presbyterian Boys | 1901 | 1979 | Merged into Scotch Oakburn College |
| Shaw College | Devonport | Catholic Girls | 1969 | 1981 | Merged into St Brendan-Shaw College |
| St Brendan's College | Devonport | Catholic Boys | 1960 | 1981 | Merged into St Brendan-Shaw College |
| St Francis Xavier's School | South Hobart | Catholic | 1965 | 1973 | |
| St John's School | Glenorchy | Catholic | 1959 | 1973 | Merged into Dominic College |
| St Joseph's College | Hobart | Catholic Girls | 1847 | 1964 | Now part of Mount Carmel College |
| St Luke's School | South Hobart | Catholic | 1863 | 1949 | |
| St Mary's School | Cygnet | Catholic Girls | 1896 | 1962 | Now part of St James Catholic College |
| St Peter's School | Hobart | Catholic Boys | 1893 | 1996 | Now part of St Virgil's College |
| St Thomas More's College | Launceston | Catholic Girls | 1938 | 1978 | Now part of St Patrick's College and St Thomas More's School |
| Stella Maris Girls College | Burnie | Catholic Girls | 1966 | 1972 | Merged into Marist Regional College |
| Tasmanian Christian Academy | Geilston Bay | Christian | | | Now part of Australian Christian College |
| Trinity College | Poatina | Christian | | 2010s | |

== See also ==
- Lists of schools in Australia
- Education in Tasmania
