= New Town High School =

Schools named New Town High School include:

- New Town High School (Maryland), Maryland, United States
- New Town High School (North Dakota), North Dakota, United States
- New Town High School (Tasmania), a former school in Tasmania, Australia

== See also ==
- Newtown High School of the Performing Arts
