= St Brendan-Shaw College =

Location
- Devonport, Tasmania; Australia; 41°09′59″S 146°20′38″E

Information
- Type: Private, day
- Motto: By faith and deed
- Denomination: Catholic
- Established: 1982
- Principal: Stuart Ralph
- Staff: 80+
- Enrolment: 690+
- Colours: Navy and blue
- Slogan: Light from Knowledge
- Affiliation: Sports Association of Tasmanian Independent Schools
- Website: www.sbsc.tas.edu.au

St Brendan-Shaw College is a co-educational Catholic college for students in Years 7–12. It is located in Devonport on the North-West Coast of Tasmania in Australia. The college has around about 700 students.

== History ==
In 1960, the Edmund Rice Christian Brothers established St Brendan's College for boys in James Street, Devonport. It was a college for boys up to Year 10.

In 1969 Shaw College, for girls, was established adjacent to St Brendan's College in Devonport. Shaw College was a Catholic Girls School established by the Sisters of St Joseph. Shaw College was named after Fr Shaw from the Roman Catholic Archdiocese of Hobart who was the first Parish Priest of Devonport. By agreement with St Brendan's College a certain degree of co-instruction was arranged at Years 9 and 10.

In 1972, by agreement of the Archdiocese, the Christian Brothers and the Sisters of St Joseph appointed one Board of Management (Devonport Regional Catholic College Board of Management) and in 1981 Br Reg Long was appointed Principal of the co-educational 'St Brendan-Shaw College'.

The college logo combines the logos of St Brendan's and Shaw Colleges, or at least elements from each. The barque of St Brendan symbolises missionary endeavour, while the 12-pointed star on the sail is taken from the Shaw badge, where it represented 'Light from Knowledge'.

Senior secondary (Year 11 and 12) classes were introduced in 1990 and the school became the regional Catholic secondary co-educational college. Today it is a co-educational college for years 7–12.

== Sport ==
St Brendan-Shaw College is a member of the Sports Association of Tasmanian Independent Schools (SATIS).

=== SATIS premierships ===
St Brendan-Shaw College has won the following SATIS premierships.

Boys:

- Basketball (2) – 2012, 2013

Girls:

- Basketball – 2017
- Netball (3) – 1996, 1999, 2000
- Rowing – 2021
- Softball (2) – 1994, 2008

== Notable alumni ==
- AFL Footballers – Grant Birchall, Jade Rawlings, Brady Rawlings, Ben Brown and Matthew Richardson.
- Cyclists – Luke Ockerby, Sam Minehan, Darryn Derrico
- Stephanie Williams – Under 17 & 19 National Champion, Australian Rowing Team member and Ohio State scholarship holder. (Rowing)
- Ben Kiely – partner at King & Wood Mallesons

== See also ==
- List of schools in Tasmania
- Education in Tasmania
- Roman Catholic Archdiocese of Hobart
- Catholic education in Australia
