= Clarence High School =

Clarence High School may refer to:

- Clarence High School (Bellerive, Tasmania), Australia
- Clarence High School (India)
- Clarence High School (Clarence, New York), United States
