= New Town High School (Tasmania) =

Location
- New Town, Hobart, Tasmania; Australia; 42°51′04″S 147°18′08″E

Information
- Type: Government comprehensive junior secondary school
- Motto: We build for the future
- Established: 1919 as Hobart Junior Technical College
- Status: Closed
- Closed: 2021
- School district: Southern
- Educational authority: Department for Education, Children and Young People
- Oversight: Office of Tasmanian Assessment, Standards & Certification
- Principal: Shane Fuller
- Teaching staff: 50.8 FTE (2019)
- Years: 7-12
- Gender: Boys (Y7-8); Co-educational (9-12)
- Enrolment: 698 (2019)
- Campus type: Suburban
- Houses: Dechaineux; Ellis; Hunter; Jarvis
- Colours: Blue and yellow
- Affiliation: Hobart City Partnership Schools
- Website: newtownhigh.tas.edu.au (archived)

New Town High School was a government comprehensive junior secondary school for boys (in Years 7 and 8) and co-educational (from Years 9 to 12). The school is located in New Town, a suburb of Hobart, Tasmania, Australia. Established in 1919, the school caters for approximately 700 students from Years 7 to 12. The school is administered by the Department for Education, Children and Young People.

In 2019 student enrolments were 698. The school principal is Shane Fuller.

It was merged with Ogilvie High School to form Hobart City High School from the 2022 school year. The New Town High School site is referred to as the New Town Campus of the new school.

== Overview ==
Established in 1919 as Hobart Junior Technical College and renamed as Hobart Technical High School in 1950, the adopted its current name, New Town High School in 1961. Together with the girls-only Ogilvie High School and co-educational Elizabeth College, New Town High School was a member of Hobart City Partnership Schools, that delivers learning to over 2,000 students across the three campuses.

== Notable alumni ==
- Neal Blewitt, academic, former politician, diplomat, and Rhodes Scholar
- Martin Bryant, the convicted mass murderer responsible for the Port Arthur massacre
- Stuart Challender, composer and conductor
- George Cole, politician and first national Leader of the Democratic Labor Party
- Ivan Dean, State Parliamentarian
- Stephen Estcourt, Puisne Judge of the Supreme Court of Tasmania
- Stuart Hamilton, public servant and Rhodes Scholar
- Peter Jones, Australian rules football player and coach
- Jim Manson, (class of 1953), Tasmanian Football Hall of Fame member and local government politician
- Nick Sherry, Senator and former Assistant Treasurer
- Roger Woolley, Australian cricketer
- Adam Coleman, Australian rugby union player
- Brad Plain, Australian rules football player (Essendon, Collingwood and North Melbourne)

== See also ==
- List of schools in Tasmania
- Education in Tasmania
