= Circular Head Christian School =

Coordinates: 40.850°S 145.118°E

- Circular Head, Tasmania; Australia

Information
- Type: Christian, independent school, co-educational, day
- Motto: All for the Glory of God
- Denomination: Christian
- Established: 1985
- Grades: K–12
- Enrolment: 370
- Website: http://www.chcs.tas.edu.au

Circular Head Christian School is an independent school in Circular Head, north-western Tasmania.

Founded in 1985 with 20 students, Circular Head Christian School serves families through the provision of Christ-centred education. It is a non- denominational Christian school that puts emphasis on Christian values. It is a co-educational K–12 school which is a member of Christian Education national. The school is governed by a board of up to nine people. The school is led by the principal, supported by the heads of each sub-school and the business manager, who leads the team of non-educational staff. The school currently has an enrolment of 370 students, which is expected to reach 400 in the near future.

Circular Head is a rural municipality of approximately 8000 people in the far north-west corner of Tasmania. The school is located on 8 hectares (20 acres) of property at 48 Nelson Street, Smithton, the principal town which has about 4200 residents. Major industries of this region include forestry, dairying and other types of farming, vegetable processing and fishing.

The school has an open enrolment policy and is evangelical in its nature. Many denominational groups are represented in the school within the board, staff and student body.

== Building the campus ==
After a year of prayer and investigation of possibilities, Circular Head Christian School began in premises owned by the local Reformed Church on the outskirts of Smithton in 1985 offering K to grade 6 education with 20 pupils. Steady growth soon resulted in this location, even with the addition of two demountable classrooms, being too small.

In 1990, after being given a generous donation of land, the school moved to our present campus in Grant Street, a 3-hectare (7.4-acre) site closer to the town centre and local bus services.

Early in 1991, the bold decision was made to establish Circular Head Christian Secondary School, beginning with grade 7 in 1992, flowing through to grade 10 over the next three years. This decision was a real step of faith because its relatively small numbers per grade level meant that it did not qualify for Commonwealth Government funding.

In 1996, the schools were merged to form a single-entity K–10 school. About this time the campus was expanded to approximately 4 hectares (9.9 acres) with the addition of new sports grounds.

In 1997 a major building program was undertaken to establish a new library complex, toilets and showers for the gymnasium, bigger staffroom and extra administration offices.

In late 1998 another building program was completed; refurbishing the technology block including a new "design in wood" workshop together with further development of the administration block.

During 2001, 4 hectares (9.9 acres) of land adjacent to its campus was purchased to give a separate horticulture teaching area and environmental study area, which also enabled a new entrance into the school campus from Nelson Street. Also a new prep classroom was added.

Late in 2002 it was necessary to build another three classrooms and common room due to continued enrolment growth and extension to grade 11 in 2003, grade 12 in 2004 to allow study areas for laptop-based learning.

The 2003–2004 summer break also allowed the school to renovate and extend its facilities. The science/cooking rooms were extended and upgraded to allow for increasing class sizes, and to stay up to date with current teaching equipment. A transportable building was purchased to allow offices for staff, a new textiles room, and a temporary drama room.

In 2004 and 2005 canopies were built over the junior and middle play/courtyards, which allowed undercover play areas in all types of weather. The science room was also refurbished during this time.

2005 also saw the extension of the gymnasium to include a permanent stage, a foyer and music room, which made the venue much more suitable to whole-school gatherings for assemblies and celebration evenings. The library block was extended by three classrooms also to accommodate the formation of middle school (grades 6–8) for the start of 2006.

Over the summer holidays of 2006–2007 the administration block and staff room were extended to almost twice the size as well as building a new prep room, junior art room and enlarging the junior extended learning areas. The horticulture building was also upgraded to classroom standard. Separate playground equipment and areas was provided for kinder, junior and middle school as well as a major refurbishment of the junior school.

In 2008 a separate building for grade 11/12 was constructed, giving individual study areas for students, two teaching areas and a common room/kitchen area.

During 2009, BER approval was gained to build a multi-purpose hall, a science centre, re-locate the library to the current gymnasium and to refurbish the old library space into an expanded area for grade 11/12.

== See also ==
- List of schools in Tasmania
- Education in Tasmania
