= Hilliard Christian School =

Location
- 32a Cheviot Road, West Moonah, Hobart, Tasmania; Australia
- Coordinates: 42°51′14″S 147°17′11″E

Information
- Type: Independent co-educational primary and secondary day school
- Motto: Nurture for today, Learning for tomorrow, Character for eternity
- Religious affiliation(s): Australian Union Conference of Seventh-day Adventists
- Denomination: Seventh-day Adventist
- Established: 1901; 124 years ago
- Principal: Elizabeth Chaplin
- Colour(s): Navy blue

Hilliard Christian School is an independent Seventh-day Adventist co-educational primary and secondary day school, located in the Hobart suburb of West Moonah, Tasmania, Australia. The school caters for students from Year K to Year 10.

The school was established in 1901 in Hobart. In 1903 Hilliard was moved to a permanent site on Warwick Street that the school occupied until April 1926.

== See also ==
- List of Seventh-day Adventist secondary schools
- Seventh-day Adventist education
- List of schools in Tasmania
