= Bayview Secondary College =

Location
- Rokeby, Hobart, Tasmania; Australia; 42°53′50″S 147°26′44″E

Information
- Former name: Rokeby High School
- Type: Government comprehensive secondary school
- Motto: Connect, inspire, achieve
- Established: 1980; 46 years ago
- Status: Open
- School district: Southern
- Educational authority: Department for Education, Children and Young People
- Oversight: Office of Tasmanian Assessment, Standards & Certification
- Principal: Gill Berriman
- Teaching staff: 26.3 FTE (2019)
- Years: 7–12
- Enrolment: 293 (2019)
- Campus type: Urban area
- Colours: Blue, red & white
- Website: bayviewsc.education.tas.edu.au

Bayview Secondary College, formerly known as Rokeby High School, is a government comprehensive secondary school located in Rokeby, a suburb of Hobart, Tasmania, Australia. Established in 1980, the school caters for approximately 300 students from Years 7 to 12. The school is administered by the Department for Education, Children and Young People. It received its current name in 2016.

In 2019 student enrolments were 293. The college principal is Gill Berriman.

== Description ==
The school enrols students from its feeder schools in the City of Clarence including primary schools located in the suburbs of Clarendon Vale, Lauderdale, Rokeby and South Arm and students from Seven Mile Beach, Cremorne, Acton and Clifton Beach.

== See also ==
- List of schools in Tasmania
- Education in Tasmania
