= Luke Ockerby =

Australian cyclist (born 1992)

Personal information
- Full name: Luke Ockerby
- Born: 17 May 1992 (age 34) Ulverstone, Tasmania, Australia

Cycling career
- Sport: Cycling
- Current team: Team Budget Forklifts
- Discipline: Road
- Role: Rider

Amateur team
- 2010: City of Burnie CC

Professional team
- 2012–: Team Budget Forklifts

Luke 'Thomas' Ockerby (born 17 May 1992) is an Australian cyclist from Ulverstone, Tasmania. Ockerby has so far won four Australian Junior Championships and many regional and interstate wheel races including the 2008 Devonport men's Wheel Race, 2009 Mersey Wheel Race and the prestigious Austral Wheel Race in 2011 and represented Australia at the 2009 Youth Olympics. Ockerby currently rides with the Tasmanian Institute of Sport (T.I.S). Also Ockerby rides off the mark of scratch in wheel races, achieving the feat at the age of 17.

== Early life ==
Ockerby was born in Launceston and lived a childhood of frequent relocations. Ockerby grew up in mainly north eastern and north western Tasmania including Launceston and Exeter. He currently resides in Ulverstone Tasmania with his family.

== Personal life ==
Ockerby attended St Brendan-Shaw College in Devonport, Tasmania. In his spare time Ockerby enjoys playing golf and mountain bike riding. In 2006 Ockerby broke his back in a mountain biking accident and made a full recovery within a year.

== 2007 ==
- Gold - National Junior Track Championships, Sprint
- Bronze - National Jnr Track Championships, TS, TT, Scratch

== 2008 ==
- Gold - Tasmanian Schoolboys Championship
- Gold - Tasmanian Road Championship
- Silver - Tasmanian Road TT Championship
- Bronze - Tasmanian Criterium Championship
- Silver - U17 National Track Championships, Scratch Race
- Bronze - U17 National Track Championships, TP, TT, IP

== 2009 ==
- Gold - U17 National Track Championships, Sprint

== 2009 ==
- Silver - U19 National Track Championships, Scratch Race, Omnium.

== 2010 ==
- Gold - U19 National Track Championships, Scratch Race

== 2011 ==
- Silver - Senior Track Championships, Omnium
