= TasTAFE =

TasTAFE is a Tasmanian tertiary education body of the Australian state-based Technical and Further Education system run by the Tasmanian Government. The main campuses are located at Hobart, Warrane, Claremont, Glenorchy, Launceston, Alanvale, Devonport and Burnie.

== Previous structures ==
TasTAFE was originally known as TAFE Tasmania and included two institutes, the Institute of TAFE Tasmania and the Drysdale Institute.

The Institute of TAFE Tasmania and Drysdale Institute were wound up in 2008 and two new bodies—the Tasmanian Polytechnic and the Skills Institute—began delivering statewide vocational education and training on 1 January 2009.

The Tasmanian Polytechnic was one of three organisations created through the Tasmania Tomorrow reforms. The other two organisations were the Tasmanian Academy and the Tasmanian Skills Institute.

The Tasmanian Polytechnic was created from the merger of Tasmanian Colleges and TAFE Tasmania, following the Tasmanian State Government's reform of post-year-10 education in 2009. This significant restructure envisaged taking place over a three-year period with the expectation of all colleges making the transition by 2011. TAFE Tasmania had been created by combining the Institutes of TAFE in Hobart (formerly Hobart Technical College, which operated from 1888 to 1994), Launceston, North West and Drysdale (Tasmania's provider of training in hospitality and tourism), with other institutions.

In the second semester of 2013, the Polytechnic was dissolved and a reformed TAFE Tasmania began operating as TasTAFE.

== See also ==
- Education in Tasmania
- Department for Education, Children and Young People
