= Penguin District School =

Location
- Penguin, Tasmania; Australia; 41.1273°S 146.0681°E

Information
- Type: Public, co-educational, secondary, day school,
- Motto: Together: We Aspire, We Strive, We Achieve.
- Principal: Mathew Perry
- Enrolment: 1280
- Campus: Suburban
- Colours: Navy blue, light blue
- Website: Penguin District School

Penguin District School is a public, co-educational high school, in Penguin, Tasmania, Australia, a town located midway between of Burnie and Ulverstone. It was created in 2013 when Penguin High School merged with Penguin Primary School. Beginning in 2019, Penguin added grade 11 and 12 classes, mainly revolving around sports-based classes. This sports focus was boosted with the opening of Dial Park, a multi-million dollar football ground sports complex on par with UTAS and Blundstone arenas. The school was first founded in the late 1800s but since then has undergone hundreds of changes including a $25 million reconstruction in 2022.

== See also ==
- List of schools in Tasmania
- Education in Tasmania
