= Leighland Christian School =

Coordinates: 41.1534°S 146.1944°E

- Ulverstone, Tasmania; Australia

Information
- Type: Christian, independent, day
- Motto: A hope filled Christian Community, pioneering personalised real-world education
- Denomination: Christian
- Established: 1976
- Principal: Natasha Mackinnon (Executive Principal)
- Enrolment: 650+ (K–12)
- Colours: Gold, black and green
- Website: leighland.tas.edu.au

Leighland Christian School is an independent, co-educational, non-denominational Christian School, situated in Tasmania, Australia.

Established in 1976, the school has two campuses, one in Burnie and one in Ulverstone. The Ulverstone campus caters for years K–12, and the Burnie campus caters for years K–6.

== History ==
On 23 September 1954 some twenty people met in the Ulverstone R.S.L. Hall with the vision of providing Christian education for their children. The meeting established an Association for Christian Education and the membership fee was fixed at $2 per year. The early members of the Association belonged to the Reformed churches on the coast. They were convinced, however that the work could not be done alone and the Association now has members from some 35 church congregations along the North West Coast. Most Christian church groups are represented.

From the start it was envisaged that the school be open to all children, regardless of social status, ethnic background, or church affiliation. Consequently, everything possible has been done to prevent the school from becoming an exclusive school accessible only to a privileged few. However, it has always been considered essential for the parents to agree with the basic Christian approach of the school.

In 1972 the Association purchased 2.5 hectares of land off Leighlands Avenue. In the same year the Penguin, Ulverstone and Devonport Associations officially pooled resources and became the Association of Christian Parent Controlled Schools on the North West Coast of Tasmania. Three years later the Association was incorporated, and in 1976 the school commenced with 36 students from Prep to Grade 6, and two staff members. It received funding under the States Grants (Schools) Act 1976.

In 1982, the school extended to secondary education with one Grade 7 class. In 1985, the first Grade 10 graduates left the school and in 1986 the first secondary class was double streamed. During 1992 the Board held discussions with the Romaine Christian School Board of Management which led to Romaine becoming a full annex of Leighland. This amalgamation was approved by the Commonwealth Government in January 1993 and Romaine became part of Leighland.

The Ulverstone and Burnie campuses have a common curriculum and share staff and resources. In November 1993, the Association purchased the Wivenhoe State School and this is now the Burnie campus of Leighland Christian School.

In 2026 the school celebrated their golden jubilee, commemorating 50 years of Christian education. Celebrations included an black-tie event at the Burnie Arts and Function Centre, looking back at the past five decades and the future to come.

== Timeline ==
- 1976 – School commenced at Ulverstone with 36 students
- 1982 – Secondary classes commence
- 1985 – First year 10 graduates
- 1986 – Double streaming of secondary classes commenced
- 1992 – Amalgamation discussions with Romaine Christian School
- 1994 – Wivenhoe campus commenced
- 1995 – Kinder class commenced at Ulverstone campus
- 1996 – Year 11 classes commenced at Ulverstone campus
- 1997 – Year 12 classes commenced at Ulverstone campus
- 2022 – Executive principal Natasha Mackinnon appointed
- 2026 - School celebrates its 50th anniversary since its commencement

== See also ==
- List of schools in Tasmania
