= Clarence High School (Bellerive, Tasmania) =

Location
- 25 Wentworth Street; Bellerive, Hobart, Tasmania; Australia; 42°52′39″S 147°23′21″E

Information
- Type: Government comprehensive junior secondary school
- Established: 1959; 67 years ago
- Status: Open
- School district: Southern
- Educational authority: Department for Education, Children and Young People
- Oversight: Office of Tasmanian Assessment, Standards & Certification
- Principal: Nick Dodd
- Teaching staff: 46.2 FTE (2021)
- Years: 7–10
- Gender: Co-educational
- Enrolment: 603 (2021)
- Campus type: Suburban
- Houses: Flynn; Gilmore; Mawson; Nightingale
- Colours: Green, white, & maroon
- Website: clarencehigh.education.tas.edu.au

Clarence High School is a government co-educational comprehensive junior secondary school located in Bellerive, a suburb of Hobart, Tasmania, Australia. Established in 1959, the school caters for approximately 600 students from Years 7 to 10. The school is administered by the Department for Education, Children and Young People.

As of July 2025, the principal of Clarence High School is Nick Dodd.

== History ==
Clarence High School was the first comprehensive state secondary school on the eastern shore of Hobart's River Derwent, opening in 1959. The school used modern and experimental ideas, and within three years of opening, it had enrolled 1100 students.

== Description ==
Clarence High School is located in Bellerive, Hobart. It caters for approximately 600 students from Years 7 to 10, and is administered by the Department for Education, Children and Young People.

The school contains a gymnasium, cricket nets, Australian rules football oval, soccer field, and a beach volleyball court.

Clarence High School has four houses: Flynn, Gilmore, Mawson, and Nightingale, named after John Flynn (1880–1951) Presbyterian minister; Dame Mary Gilmore (1865–1962), poet, writer, and social reformer; Sir Douglas Mawson (1882–1958), geologist and Antarctic explorer; and Florence Nightingale (1820–1910), the English nurse who founded the nursing profession.

Enrolment in 2021 was 603. As of July 2025, the principal of Clarence High School is Nick Dodd.

== Transport ==
Metro Tasmania operates several bus lines that run past the school, with some bus lines running into and out from the school grounds.

== See also ==
- List of schools in Tasmania
- Education in Tasmania
