= St John's Anglican Church, New Town =

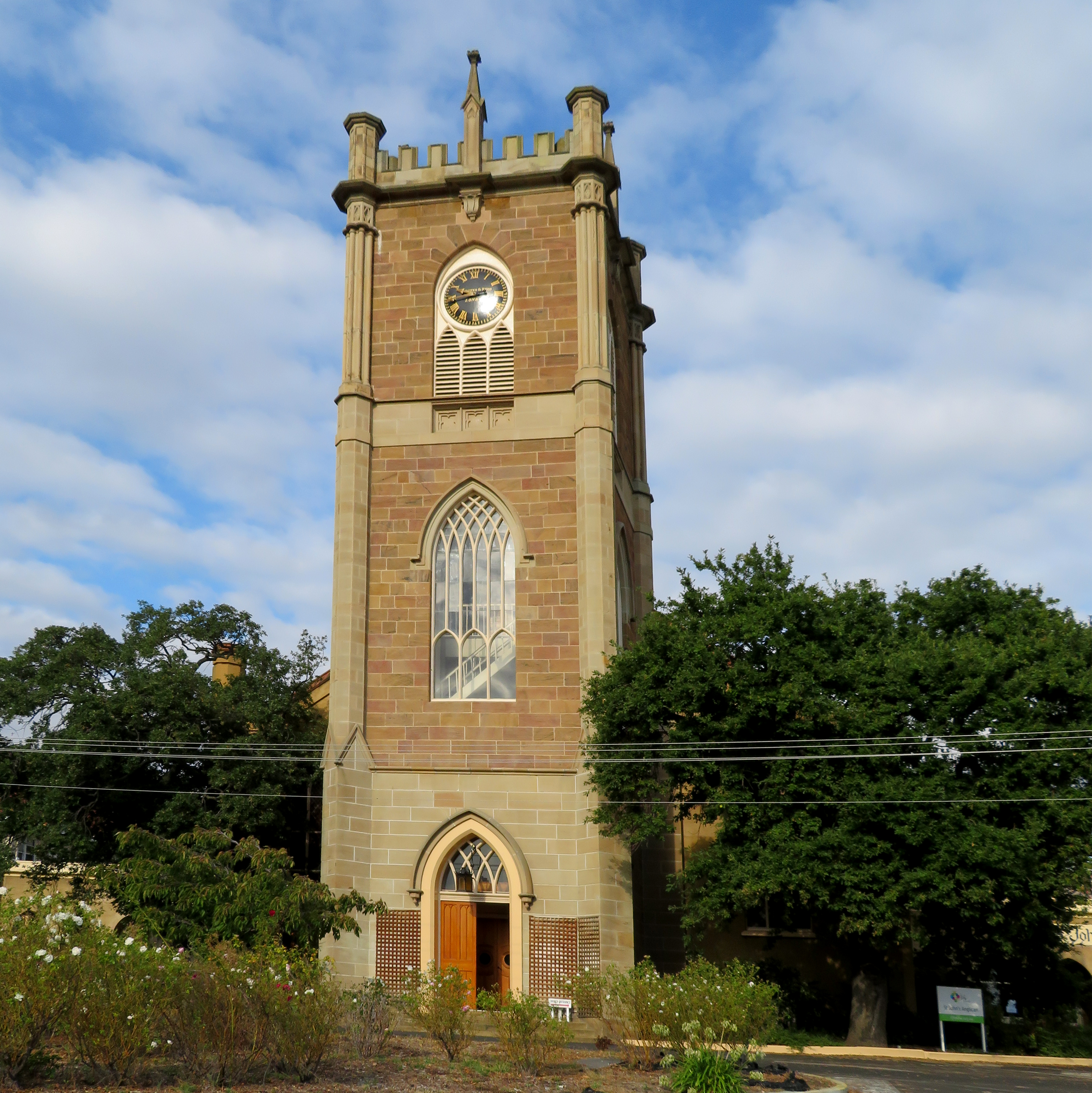
- St John's Anglican Church, New Town
- 42.8548°S 147.2971°E
- Location: 14 St John's Avenue, New Town, Tasmania
- Country: Australia
- Denomination: Anglican
- Website: lifenow.org.au

History
- Founded: 6 January 1834
- Consecrated: 29 May 1838

Architecture
- Architect: John Lee Archer
- Architectural type: Gothic Revival
- Groundbreaking: 1834
- Completed: 1835

Specifications
- Materials: Convict bricks and sandstone ?

Administration
- Diocese: Anglican Diocese of Tasmania
- Parish: St John's New Town

St John's Anglican Church is an Anglican church located in New Town, Tasmania, Australia, notable for its unbroken record of use as a parish church, from the first service on 20 December 1835 to the present day. The parish is administered by the Anglican Diocese of Tasmania.

The building was designed by the Tasmanian government civil engineer and architect, Dublin-born John Lee Archer, who had been appointed in 1826 and arrived in Hobart Town in August 1827.

The church was built by labourers and tradespeople from amongst the convicts on the island.

Since it is more than 180 years old, the church contains many features that reflect the life and times of Hobart as it developed in the 19th and 20th centuries.

== History ==
In 1830, there were plans for the construction in New Town of an orphanage and chapel (also known as the Orphan School or the Asylum). The "orphans" were children of convicts or Aboriginals and also young offenders.

The Tasmanian governor George Arthur upgraded the plan for a chapel to a parish church for the surrounding area, to be funded by donations.

As O'Neill recounts, the pleasing exterior belied the grim conditions within: "From the beginning, the Orphan School seems to have been a bleak place".

The Orphan School, designed by John Lee Archer, was situated in St John's Avenue, New Town. The parish church of St John's stood between the buildings for boys and for girls. In God's Own Country, Boyce describes this as a 'parish partnership' between the Church and government with the church designed specifically for the needs of the Asylum, convicts and free settlers. The children sat in one gallery and the convicts in the other with the settlers in the main body. Barriers and separate entrances prevented the children from seeing the convicts. Church of England clergy dominated the committee that managed the Asylum.

Convicts built the church, using raw materials such as hand-made bricks for the walls, hand-hewn stone for the tower, and timber beams cut from trees on nearby Mount Wellington. The work was sufficiently complete for the first service to be conducted 20 December 1835.

== Features ==
The exterior and interior features of the building are of architectural and historical significance, and the church and surrounding precinct is listed on the Tasmanian Heritage Register.

By the 1850s, whale oil was burned in all the lamps that lit the church. This was considered a modern and progressive technique at the time, but would not be practised in the 21st century due to whales' protection under legislation.

=== Pipe organ ===
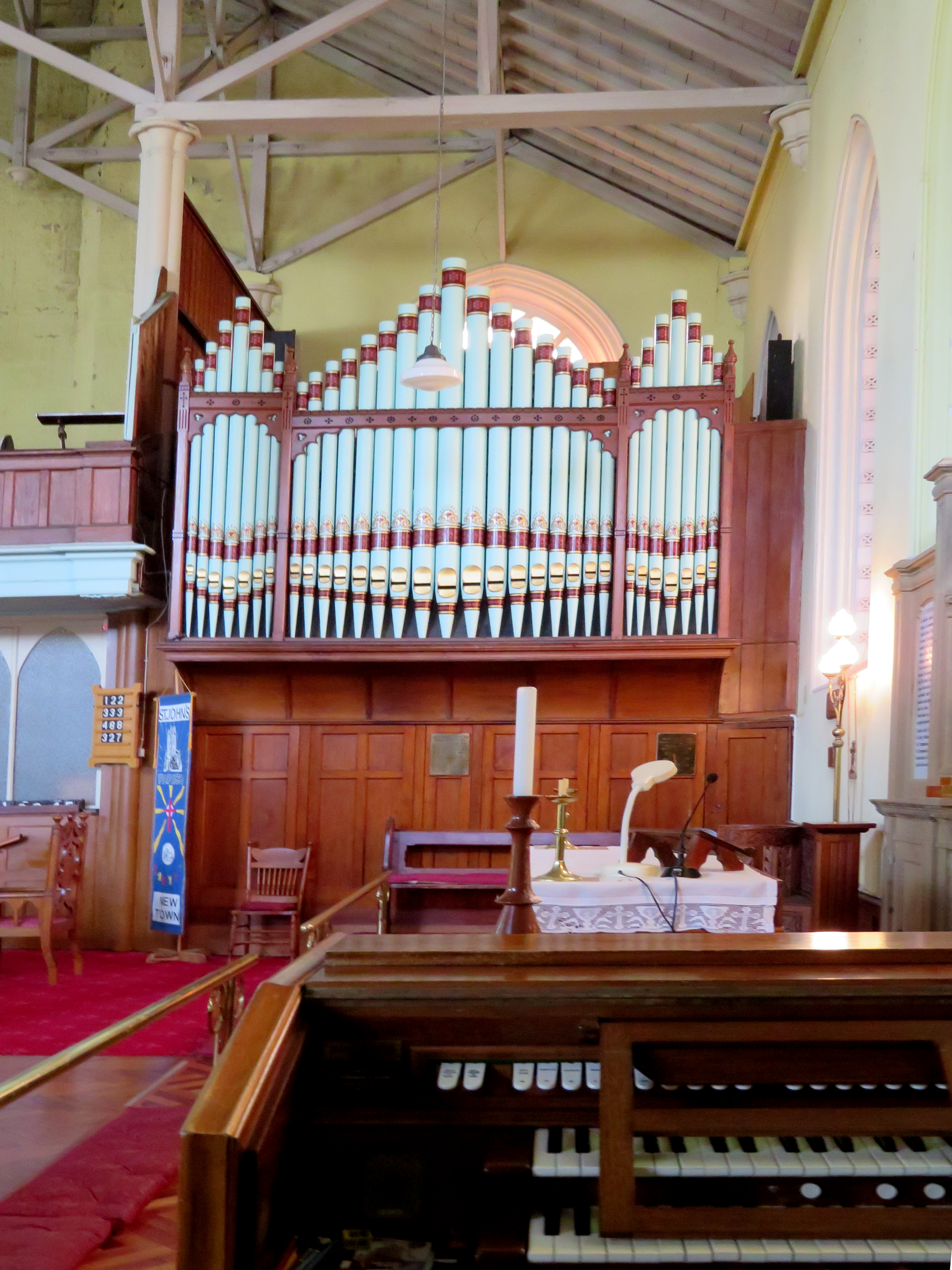
The Hill & Son Organ seen from the console, in St John's New Town

The church's organ has evolved over time, as described by John Maidment of the Organ Historical Trust of Australia:

The first organ was built by Gray & Davison, London. It had a Gothic case in stained and varnished oak, with gilt facade pipes. This organ was sold to St John's Presbyterian Church, Macquarie Street, Hobart and was replaced by a new organ built in 1901 by Geo. Fincham & Son of Melbourne. This organ was rebuilt in 1955 by Hill, Norman & Beard (Australia) Pty Ltd, of Clifton Hill, Victoria. The organ was further rebuilt in 1977-78 by Laurie Pipe Organs Pty Ltd, of Moorabbin, Victoria when some further tonal changes were made including a full-length metal Bassoon 16ft to the Pedal Organ.. At some stage, the pipe mouths have been overpainted, removing the original border decoration.

=== Clock and bell ===
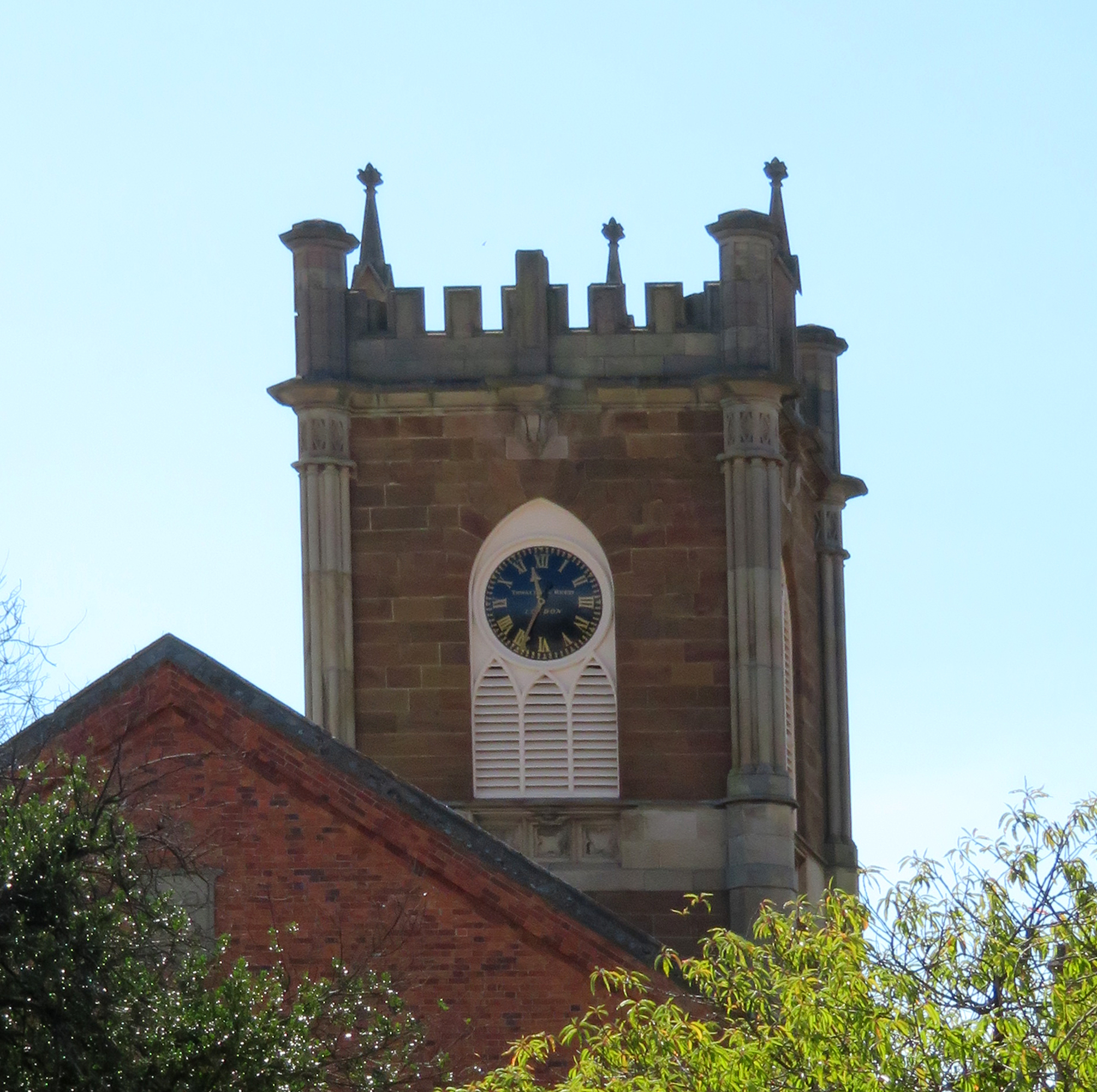
St John's Church clock, seen from Creek Road

As described by Archer's biographer, Roy Smith, "The tower of St. John's Church, New Town is carried out in freestone in a simple pointed Gothic style, with a battlemented top and with octagonal buttresses finishing as pinnacles." On all four sides, the tower exhibits a clock that still chimes the hours, although it is "older than Big Ben" according to Walters, who records that it was made in London in 1818 by Thwaites & Reed and that the clock's bell was donated as a royal gift from the English king William IV in 1834.

The original bell had to be decommissioned in 1916 because of safety considerations. It was melted down and formed into commemorative medallions. A replacement bell was installed in 1929, jointly funded by all the churches in the district, whatever their denomination.

One of several refurbishments occurred in 1978, when the clock's dial was restored to its original gold Roman figures on a black background.

=== Pulpit ===
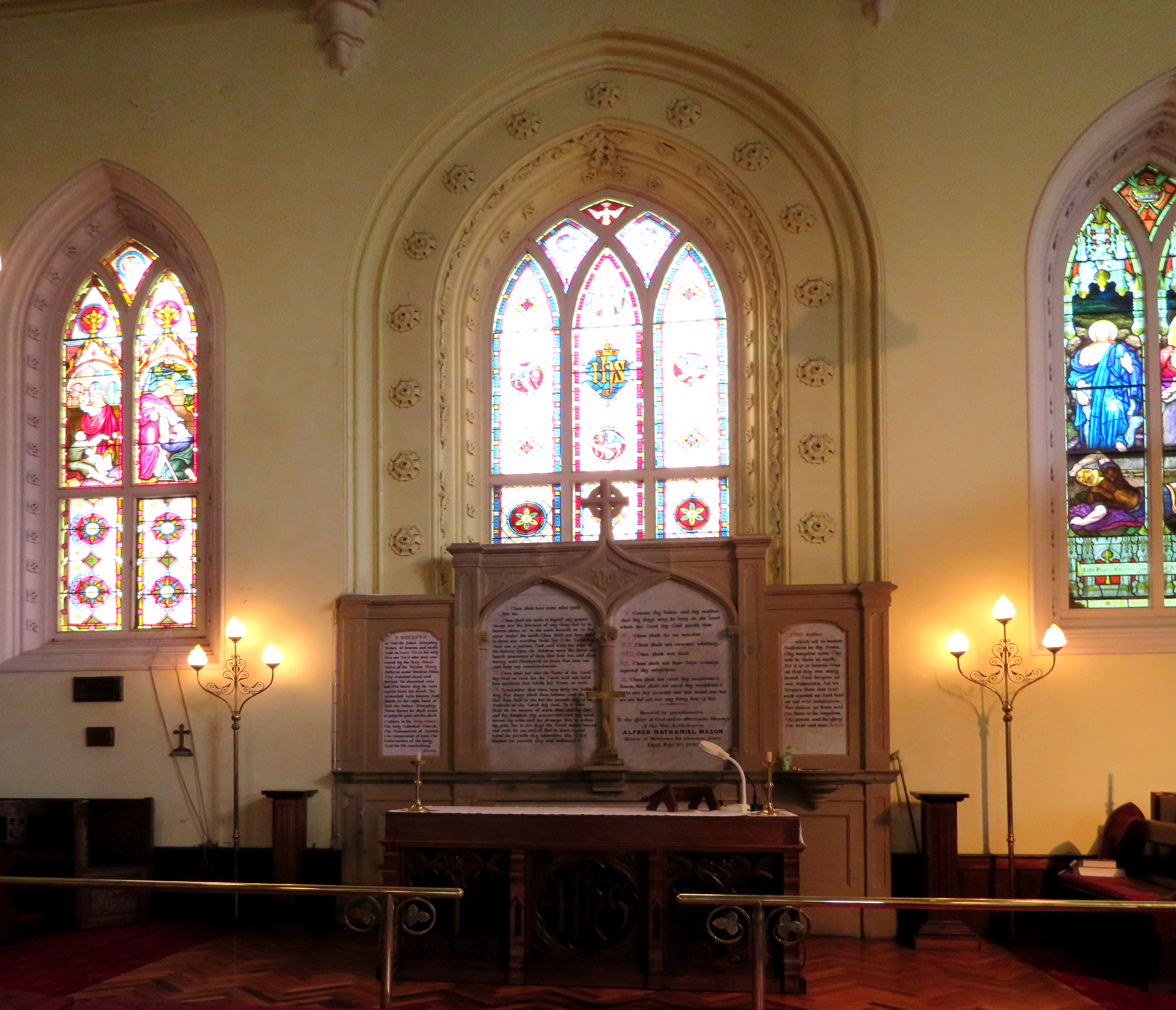
The altar in St John's New Town, also showing a sample of the many stained glass windows

Imported cedar wood was used to construct and carve the pulpit, designed to be imposing at a height of four metres (over 13 feet), with three decks. Only the top deck remains today, but a drawing of the original can be seen in the church pamphlet.

=== Pews and galleries ===
The first pews, like the pulpit, were made from imported cedar wood. They were of the high box style, arranged to face a central aisle rather than all facing the altar as the modern bench-pews do. These seats were reserved for members of the congregation who were neither orphans nor convicts. The orphans and convicts were restricted to the North Gallery and South Gallery respectively, both of which were entirely devoid of comforts, and rigorously segregated.

=== Narthex ===
A small side-chapel, the Narthex, was dedicated on 26 April 1987 to the memory of Margaret Anne Hemsley, who had been a valued parishioner active in the service of the community.

=== Catherine Latta Gallery ===
Documents and photographs about the history of the church and its congregation are stored and displayed in a room set aside for the purpose, dedicated to the memory of Catherine Latta.

=== Graveyard ===
As Whiteley records in her blog (exhibiting photographs of the church together with much historical information):

There was both an Anglican & a Catholic cemetery on site until the 1870s. Children from the orphans schools were buried here, but it was also the parish cemetery for residents of New Town. The stones were cleared in the 1960s, and many taken to Cornelian Bay.
