= Herrick Presbyterian Covenant School =

Location
- Herrick, Tasmania, Tasmania; Australia
- Coordinates: 41°6′1″S 147°52′44″E

Information
- Type: Christian, private school, day
- Principal: John Torlach
- Website: http://www.herrickschool.com/index.htm

Herrick Presbyterian Covenant School is a grade 1 through 10 Christian school in Herrick, Tasmania.

The education students receive at Herrick Presbyterian Covenant School is based on the "Word of God", as summarized in the Westminster Confession of Faith.

The school states that "Herrick Christian School seeks to provide the best in Covenant Christian education. (They) strive continually to nurture the development of the whole child consistent with the Word of God."

They also state that they aim to "prepare students to live and work for Christ sensitively, responsibly, and effectively in our society."
