= Tasmanian Certificate of Education =

Secondary school qualification in Tasmania, Australia

Tasmanian Qualifications Authority

The Tasmanian Certificate of Education (TCE) is the main credential awarded to secondary school students who successfully complete senior high school level studies (years 11 and 12 or equivalent) in Tasmania, Australia. It was introduced in 1992 to replace Tasmania's old "High School Certificate", and partially restructured for 2007.

== Patterns of Study ==
The majority of students undertake TASC-accredited courses over the final two years of school, however it is possible to undertake different study patterns over different time periods or through different teaching organisations. The last two year of high school have, for many years, been completed at Colleges (schools specialising in teaching years 11 and 12) or non-government schools. In 2017, the Minister for Education announced that all government schools would offer years 11 and 12 by 2022.

== Courses ==
Tasmanian Assessment, Standards and Certification (TASC) accredits and assesses all eligible courses. TASC also assesses all students for their Tertiary Entrance Score (TES) and presents any awards earned.

The courses offered for study within the TCE are divided into categories according to the relevant knowledge types or skills. These reflect the nature of the subject and are similar to the way universities allocate areas of study according to faculty. These are: The Arts; English; Health and Physical Education; Humanities and Social Sciences; Languages; Mathematics; Science; Technologies; UTAS - High Achiever Program; and UTAS - University Connections Program.

The High Achiever Program (HAP) allows students who specialise in available subjects to take courses and units at the University of Tasmania (UTAS). These courses can provide credit to a UTAS degree and guarantees a place in the University. Some UTAS HAP units can contribute to a student's Australian Tertiary Admissions Rank. The admissions process for entry into the HAP is selective.

The University Connections Program (UCP), formerly known as the University College Program, allows students to study university units as well as TASC courses. Unlike the HAP, the University Connections Program is accessible by any year 11 or 12 student. Some UCP units contribute to one's ATAR. Acceptance into the UCP costs but domestic students are covered by a scholarship and have their fee reduced.

All available courses can be found on TASC's website.

== Assessment ==
The Tasmanian Certificate of Education is awarded if students meet the TCE standards of participation and achievement, and the Everyday Adult standards of reading, writing and communicating in English, mathematics, and use of computers and internet. Some courses offered by TASC include the literacy, numeracy, or ICT standards in their assessment and this is how students meet the Everyday Adult standards. The participation and achievement standard is met by studying a full-time load of 120 TCE points, or 120 hours over two years, 80 of which must be at a level 2 or higher.

Subjects are offered at varying levels of difficulty, ranging from a basic understanding, through to a pre-tertiary entrance qualification. The difficulty of a subject is guided by its rating as a 1-4 or preliminary level subject. Preliminary subjects do not offer TCE points, and level 1-4 subjects have increasing levels of difficulty and requirements. Different awards are available for classes of all levels upon completion, including, Limited Achievement (LA), Preliminary Achievement (PA), Standard Achievement (SA), Commendable Achievement (CA), High Achievement (HA), and Exceptional Achievement (EA).

Achieving an ATAR requires a student to successfully complete 4-5 level 3 subjects or higher achieving an award of at least a Standard Achievement (SA). The completion of eligible subjects will result in the achievement a Tertiary Education Score (TES), which is then mapped to a corresponding ATAR.

== Award ==
Upon successful completion of a satisfactory pattern of study students are awarded the "Tasmanian Certificate of Education" (TCE) by way of a testamur. This may also come with an Australian Tertiary Admission Rank (ATAR). The ATAR score will dictate which university courses the student is eligible to apply for.

== See also ==
- List of schools in Tasmania
- University admission
- Victorian Certificate of Education
- Higher School Certificate
