= Oakwood School, Tasmania =

OneSchool Global Tasmania also known as Oakwood School is a 3–12 coeducational independent day school located in the island state of Tasmania in Australia. It is affiliated with the Plymouth Brethren Christian Church.

The school consists of two campuses;

- 41.45201°S 147.16015°E – Launceston
- 42.7987°S 147.2577°E – Hobart
