= New Town, Tasmania =

New Town
- Suburb
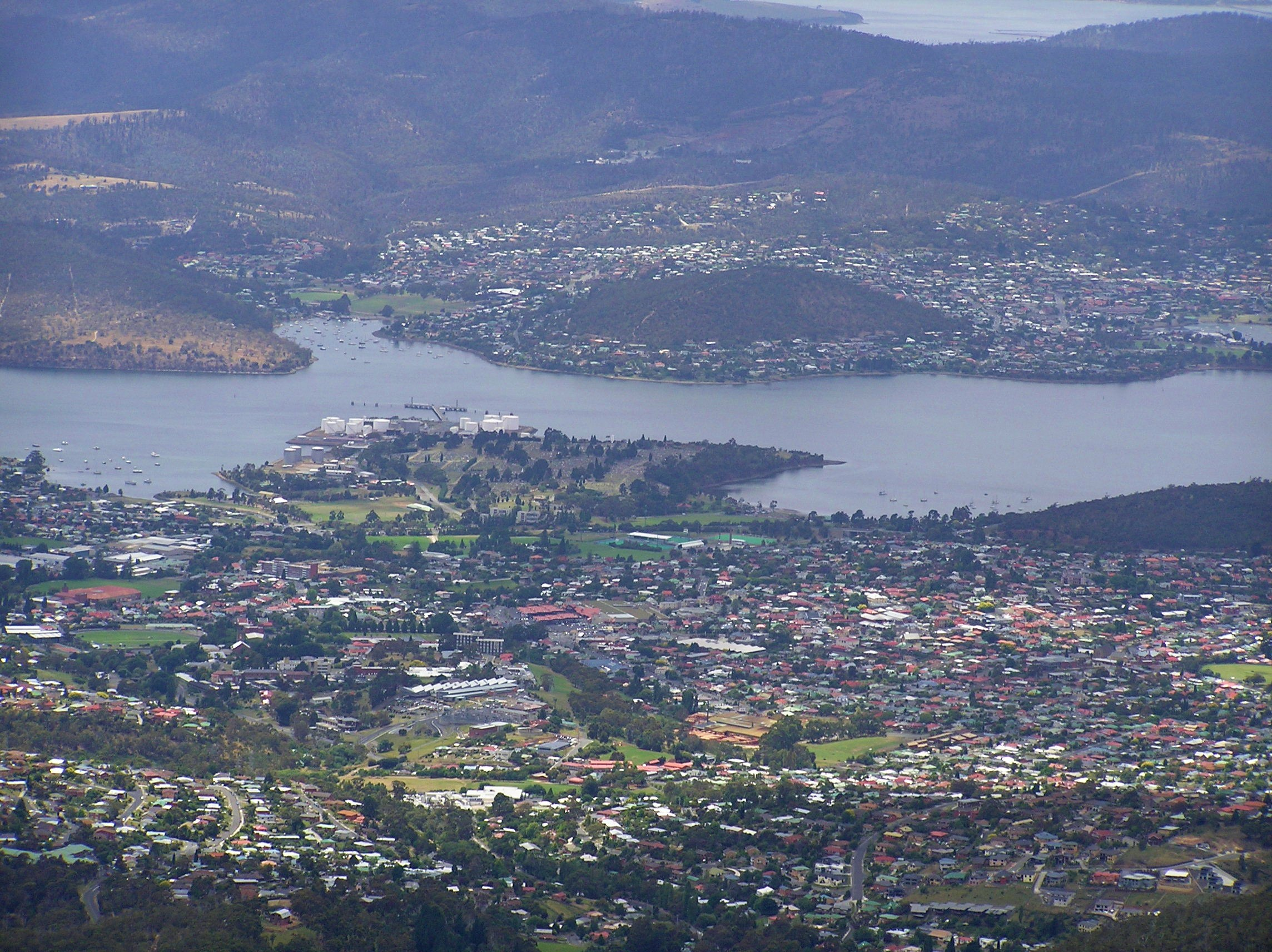
- New Town viewed from Lost World to the west. New Town Bay is on the left and Cornelian Bay is on the right behind the suburb.

- Interactive map of New Town
- Coordinates: 42°51′34″S 147°18′20″E
- Country: Australia
- State: Tasmania
- City: Hobart
- LGA: City of Hobart

Government
  - State electorate: Clark
  - Federal division: Clark

Population
  - Total: 6,781 (SAL 2021)
- Postcode: 7008
Suburbs around New Town
West Moonah	Moonah	Cornelian Bay
Lenah Valley	New Town	Queens Domain
Lenah Valley	Mount Stuart	North Hobart

New Town is a suburb of the city of Hobart, Tasmania, Australia, about 4 kilometres (2 mi) north of the central business district of Hobart. It is generally considered Hobart's oldest suburb, settled just a week after Sullivans Cove. It was historically the home of many of Hobart's wealthiest citizens, and New Town features a large number of grand residences, churches, and public buildings. The large farms were broken up following the world wars and it is now an inner city residential suburb. Many of its streets are lined with Federation style cottages. It is surrounded by the suburbs of North Hobart, Mount Stuart, Lenah Valley and Moonah, with the Queens Domain just to the south-east. Most of the locality is within the Hobart local government area, with 2.5% within Glenorchy.

== History ==
At the time of Hobart's re-settlement on the western shore of the River Derwent in 1804, the first free settlers were landed at New Town Bay a day after the military and convict landing on Hunter Island on 20/21 February. Some early buildings remain including Pitt Farm which is the second oldest farmhouse in Australia.

St John's Anglican Church in New Town has an unbroken record of use as a parish church, from the first service on 20 December 1835 up to the present. The building was designed by the Tasmanian government civil engineer and architect, John Lee Archer.

New Town Post Office opened on 1 January 1842.

Video City opened the largest video rental shop in Australia on New Town Road in 2002. The store remained a vibrant cultural institution long after the arrival of online streaming services in the 2010s. After selling its catalogue of over 30,000 video titles, the store ceased trading in 2019.

== Today ==
New Town had the only two single-sex public schools in Tasmania - Ogilvie High School for girls, and New Town High School for boys (Now combined to make "Hobart City Highschool"). There is also a third main school in New Town, the Catholic Sacred Heart College, New Town Campus, with over 1000 students. New Town Primary School is over a hundred years old. The major shopping centre is New Town Plaza, which houses a Kmart, a Coles supermarket and several smaller specialty shops.

New Town is well known for its leafy streets flanked by Colonial, Georgian, Federation, Italianate and Art Deco residences, with many large homes and mansions scattered throughout the suburb. Architects who have worked on New Town homes include Thomas Reibey Atkinson, grandson of Mary Reibey, and Henry Hunter, one of Hobart's most prominent early colonial architects.

The InterCity Cycleway passes directly through the suburb, on its course from Claremont to the city.

The main road in New Town is known as "New Town Road" and follows on from Elizabeth Street in Hobart. The road connects Hobart with the neighbouring city of Glenorchy. Other main roads in New Town are Augusta Road, which leads into Lenah Valley, and Giblin Street which becomes Forster Street and then becomes Risdon Road as it continues down towards the Brooker Highway.

== Gallery ==
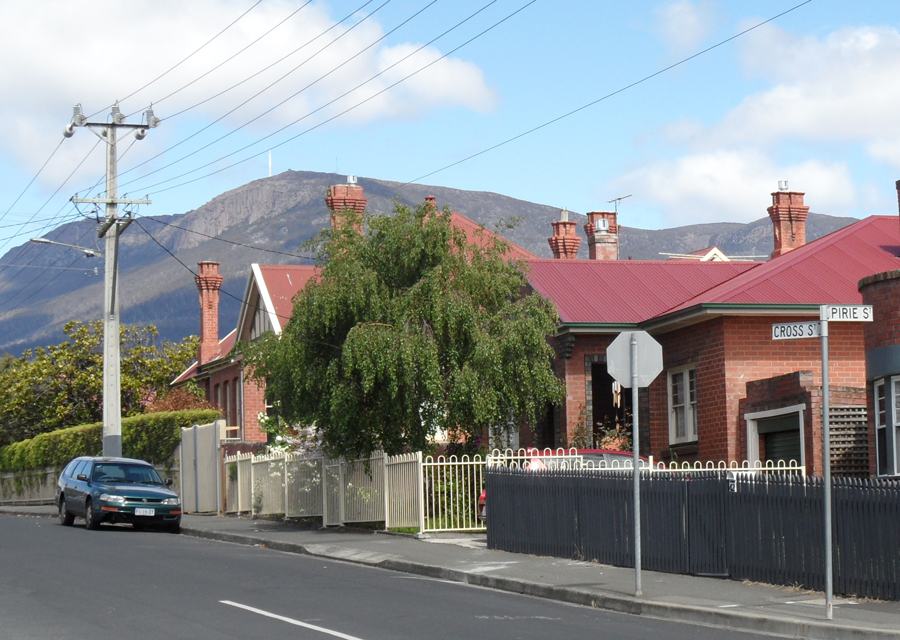
A view of Cross Street, New Town, with backdrop of Mount Wellington

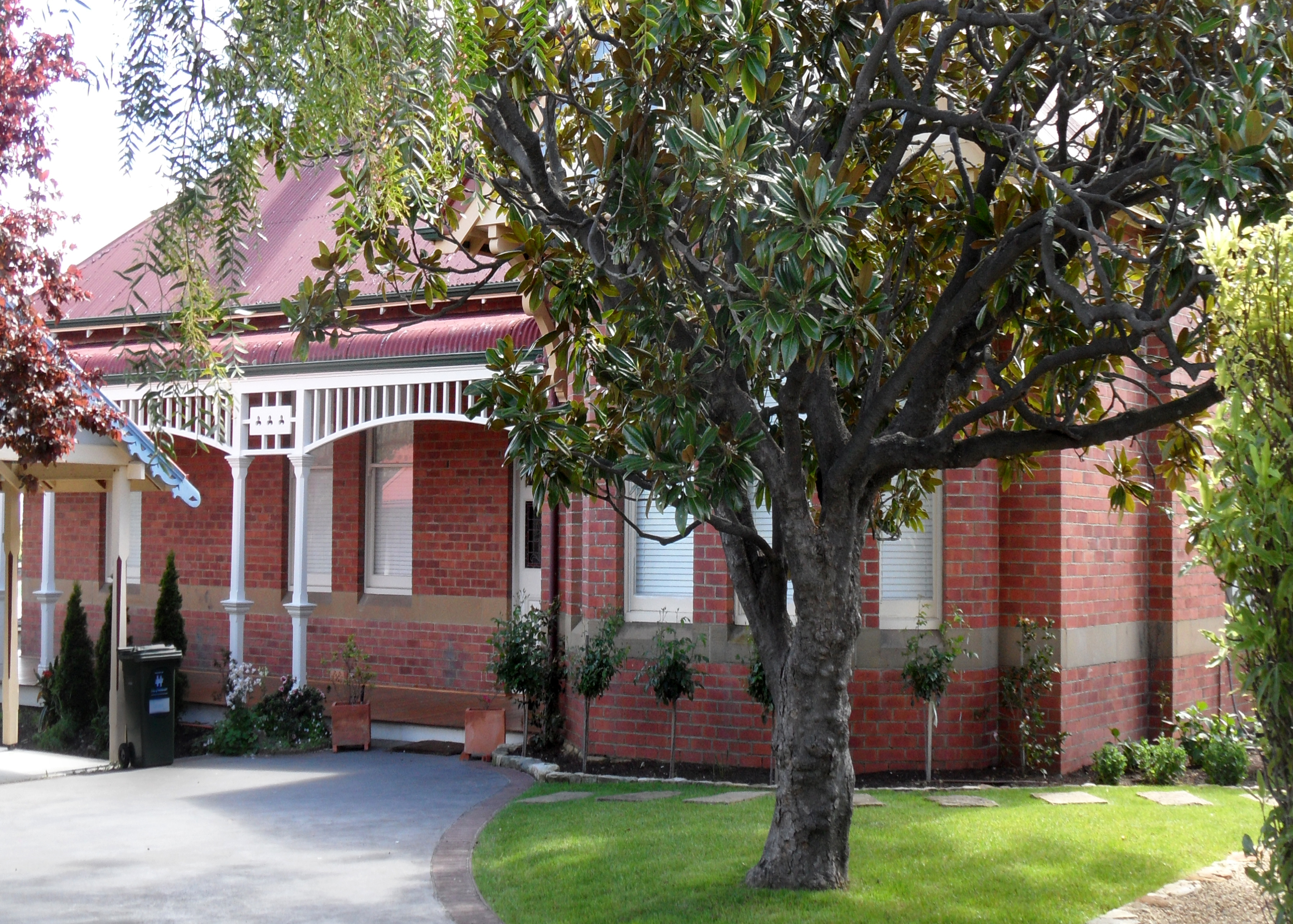
1906 Federation architecture in Cross Street, New Town

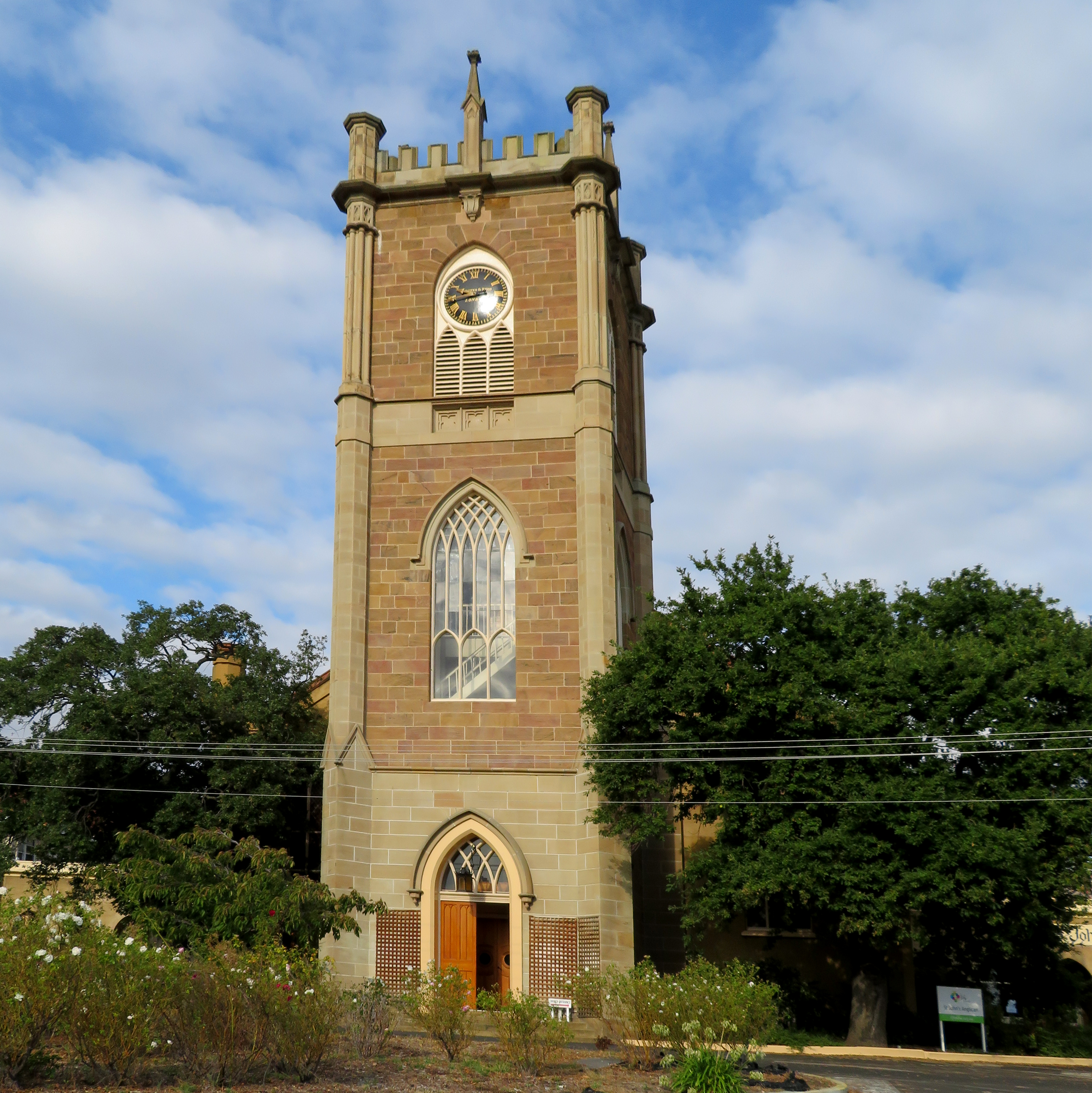
1835 St John's Anglican Church, New Town
