= Yolla District School =

Location
- Yolla; Australia
- Coordinates: 41.12356°S 145.71988°E

Information
- Type: farming and agriculture
- Established: 1904; 121 years ago
- Grades: K–12

Yolla District School is an agriculturally based high school located in the town of Yolla, Tasmania, Australia in the Waratah Wynyard municipality.

== Education ==
Yolla District School teaches from Kindergarten to Grade 12. Yolla District School specialises in farming and agriculture, though all the education is not based on these particular subjects. The uniform is mainly green. The school opened in 1904 and is still currently running. In March 2017, the school was one of eighteen to have an expansion to year 11 and 12
