= Year 11 =

School year group

Year 11 is an educational year group in schools in many countries including England and Wales, Northern Ireland, Australia and New Zealand. It is the eleventh or twelfth year of core education. For some Year 11 students it is their final year studying and may include final exams. In the US and Canada, it is referred to as tenth grade. Students in Year 11 are usually aged 14 to 15.

== Australia ==
In Australia, Year 11 is typically the twelfth year of education. Although there are slight variations between the states, most students in Year 11 are aged between sixteen and seventeen.

In New South Wales and Queensland, Year 11 is the shortest year as it only lasts three whole terms. Year 12 begins its first term where Year 11 would have its fourth.

== New Zealand ==
In New Zealand, Year 11 is the eleventh full year of compulsory education (5-year-olds usually start their first year in Year 0 until the new calendar year). Students entering Year Eleven are usually aged fifteen between 14.5 and 16, but there is no minimum age. Year 11 pupils are educated in Secondary schools or in Area schools. Year 11 was previously known as the 5th Form and for most students they are studying for NCEA Level 1 which equates to what was previously known as School Certificate.

== United Kingdom ==
=== England ===
In schools in England, Year 11 is the eleventh year after reception. It is the eleventh full year of compulsory education, with students being aged between fifteen and sixteen.

It is also the final year of Key Stage 4 in which the Secondary National Curriculum is taught and GCSE examinations are taken.

Year 11 is usually the final year of secondary school. In some schools, students may stay on in the same establishment for their sixth form education, where year groups may continue to be numbered 12 and 13. Since September 2011, further education has been compulsory.

Most state schools adopted Year 11 as the title for the final year of compulsory education in September 1990, in place of Fifth Year.

Students go on to complete further education in the forms of BTEC Diplomas, A-Levels, or completing an Apprenticeship in whatever subject they would like.

=== Wales ===
In schools in Wales Year 11 is the eleventh year after Reception. It is currently the eleventh full year of compulsory education, with students being admitted who are aged 15 on 1 September in any given academic year. It is the final year group in Key Stage 4.

=== Northern Ireland ===
In Northern Ireland Year 11 is the fourth year of Secondary education. Students in Year 11 are aged between 14 and 15. It is the first year of Key Stage 4.

=== Scotland ===
In Scotland Year 11 is known as Fourth year which is the fourth year of secondary education. Fourth year, also known as S4, is the fourth year of schooling in Scottish secondary schools. Most pupils are 15 or 16 years old at the end of S4. Fourth year students sit their National 3, 4 or 5 exams, and formerly Standard Grades. Students pick their courses for Highers to sit in Fifth year. Students aged 16 are entitled to leave school at the end of fourth year, the age of majority in Scots law.

Preceded by Year 10	Year 11; 15–16; 16–17	Succeeded by Year 12
