= Year 10 =

School year group

Year 10 is the tenth year of compulsory education in schools in many countries including England, Australia, India, Northern Ireland, New Zealand and Wales. It is the tenth or eleventh year of compulsory education. It is approximately equivalent to Ninth grade or "first year" in the US, and grade nine in Canada. It is the penultimate year of compulsory education. Children in this year are generally 14 to 15 years old.

== Bangladesh ==
In schools in Bangladesh Year 10 or Class Ten (X) is the tenth year after Kindergarten. It is the tenth full year of compulsory education, with children being admitted who are aged 15 by 1 September in any given academic year. Year 10 is usually the fourth year of Secondary school. During this year or by the end of Year 10, all qualifying students complete Secondary school.

== Australia ==
In Australia, Year 10 is the eleventh year of compulsory education. Although there are slight variations between the states, most children in Year 10 are aged between fifteen and sixteen. Year 10 is the first year of senior compulsory education in Australia. Students may elect to opt out of the education program at this point. This leaves the student without a VCE certificate (similar certificates apply in other states), and most choose to attend TAFE or enter an apprenticeship. Until 2011, students that completed Year 10 in New South Wales would obtain their School Certificate.

== New Zealand ==
In New Zealand, Year 10 is the tenth full year of compulsory education. Children entering Year 10 are usually aged between 13.5 and 15, but there is no minimum age. Year 10 pupils are educated in Secondary schools or in Area schools.

== United Kingdom ==
=== England ===
In schools in England Year 10 is the tenth year after Reception. It is the tenth full year of compulsory education, with children being aged between fourteen and fifteen. It is the first year of key stage 4 in which the secondary National Curriculum is taught and most GCSE courses are begun.

Year 10 is usually the fourth year of Secondary school and was previously called the "fourth year" or "fourth form". In some areas of England, with three-tier education it is the second- or third-year group of Secondary school.

=== Wales ===
In schools in Wales Year 10 is the tenth year after Reception. It is currently the tenth full year of compulsory education, with children being admitted who are aged 14 before 1 September in any given academic year. It is the first-year group in Key Stage 4.

=== Northern Ireland ===
In Northern Ireland, Year 10 is the tenth year of compulsory education and third year of secondary education. Children in Year 10 are usually aged between 13 and 14. It is the third and final year of Key Stage 3. It's constantly referred to as "Third Year" or "Third Form" locally in Northern Ireland.

Year 10 is significant for students as they make crucial decisions about picking their GCSE options and move on to the final stage of compulsory education, Key Stage 4.

=== Scotland ===
In schools in Scotland Year 10 is known as Third year which is the third year of secondary education. Third year, also known as S3, is the third year of schooling in Scottish secondary schools. Most pupils are 14 or 15 years old at the end of S3. Traditionally it would be the year that pupils start their Standard Grade courses. As of 2013, it is standard for schools to continue to offer a broad general education course mixed with National 3 – National 5 work. At the end of S3, pupils usually choose subjects in which they will work on in their Fourth year to sit National 3, 4 or 5. Standard Grade courses are no longer taught in Scottish secondary schools. All schools must follow the ever changing 'Curriculum for Excellence'.

== India ==
In India, Year 10 (known as Class 9 or Standard 9) is usually the tenth year of compulsory education. It is the 1st year in High School, with standard 10 or class 10 as the second and final year in high school. It is also known as Matriculation and makes the students eligible for attending Pre-University Certificate course (or popularly called PUC or class 12th) which in turn will make them eligible to attend college.

| Preceded by Year 9 | Year 10; 14–15; 15–16 | Succeeded by Year 11 |
