= Education in Tasmania =

Department for Education, Children and Young People
- Minister for Education: Jo Palmer
- Minister for Children and Youth: Roger Jaensch

General details
- Primary languages: English
- System type: State
- Compulsory education: 1868

Enrollment (2023)
- Total: 55,359.9 FTE
- Primary: 31,309.6 FTE
- Secondary: 24,050.3 FTE

Attainment
- Secondary diploma: Tasmanian Certificate of Education

The education system in Tasmania comprises the education of children from their early years, through kindergarten, primary and high school, and tertiary education in universities and vocational education and training organisations. The system is delivered by the government-run K–12 schooling system, and numerous independent schools and colleges, most of which are controlled or sponsored by religious organisations. Public education in Tasmania is managed primarily by the Department for Education, Children and Young People. The Department is responsible for all aspects of education in Tasmania including schooling, adult education, the State Library and TasTAFE, a vocational tertiary institution with many campuses around the state.

Education in Australia details a national overview of the education system.

== History ==
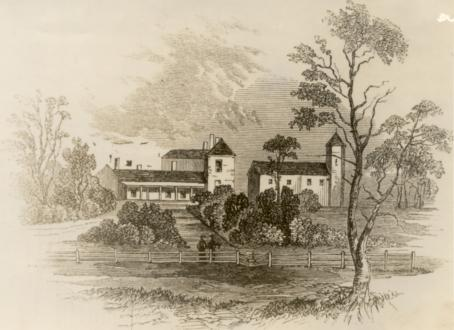
Christ College 1846-1856, Bishopsbourne

The oldest tertiary institution to be founded in Australia was the theological school Christ College in Bishopsbourne, Tasmania, in 1846. Today Christ College is a residential college of the University of Tasmania, which was founded in 1890, making the university the fourth oldest in the country.

In 1868 Tasmania became the first Australian colony to introduce compulsory education. In 1885 the Tasmanian Department of Education was founded under the Education Act 1885 (Tas), the fifth Australian colony to establish a government department with specific responsibility for education and public instruction. In 1908 school fees for compulsory education were abolished, the last Australian state to do so.

== Early childhood education ==
The Tasmanian Education Department Launching into Learning program is a free program for young children (from birth to 4 years old) and their families. It helps parents and their child get to know their local school and other families. Launching into Learning operates in all Tasmanian Government primary and district schools and Child and Family Centres.

== Primary education ==
Whereas all other Australian states have a two-tiered system for primary and secondary education, in Tasmania a three-tiered system applies covering primary, high school for students from Years 7 to 10, and colleges for students in Years 11 and 12, and in some college, an optional Year 13. Kindergarten commences for children aged from four years old on 1 January in the year of enrolment. Children who are formally identified as gifted may be eligible to start Kindergarten early – and they must be aged at least three years and six months as of 1 January in the year in which they will start. Students begin their first year of school (preparatory) in the year the child will turn six years of age. They spend seven years in primary school before progressing to secondary education, like other states.

== Secondary education ==
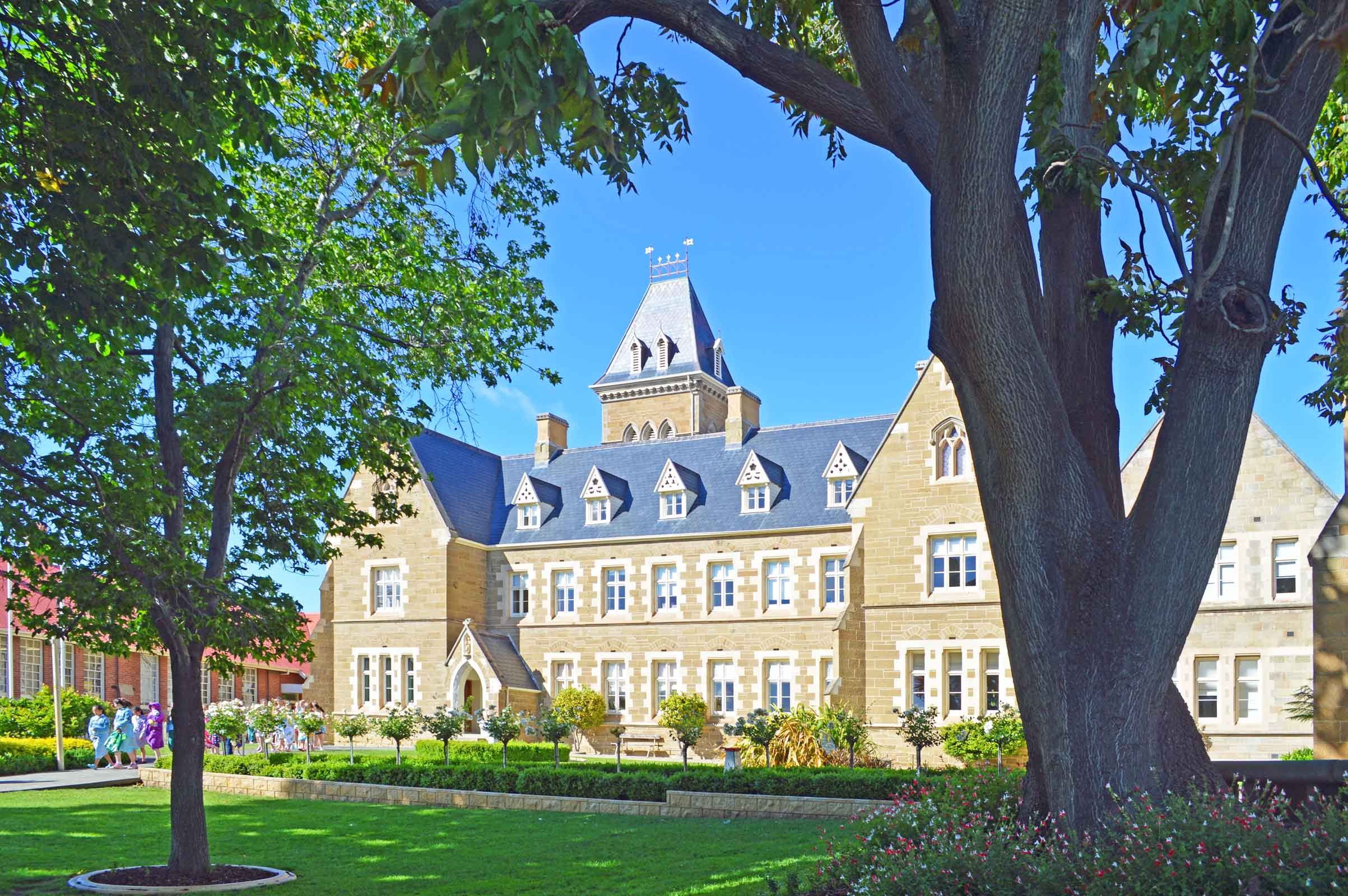
St Mary's College in Hobart

Similarly to other states, years 11 and 12 students can obtain the Tasmanian Certificate of Education (TCE) or can complete Vocational Education Training. Yet unlike other states, Tasmania has separate schools, called colleges, for the final two years. Years 7-10 are undertaken at high schools, although district schools and many nongovernment schools combine primary, high school, and college education together, depending on the needs of the school.

There has been much of criticism of this system of education as only half of Year 10 students will go on to college and complete their secondary education. Furthermore, 50% of the state is classified as functionally illiterate, and more than half of the state's teenagers fall below the national baseline for maths. Students who do not live near a college, which are all located in Hobart, Launceston, Devonport and Burnie, are frequently required to board to obtain their TCE, forcing many 16 year-olds to leave home. However, recent changes by the Tasmanian government has led to a push to make regional high schools offer TCE subjects.

=== Public high schools ===
Public high schools entirely co-educational and teach students from Years 7 to 10 or more recently Year 12. A list of these schools is located at the list of high schools in Tasmania.

=== Colleges (Senior High Schools) ===
In Tasmania, colleges are Senior High Schools that cater only for Year 11 and 12 students. There are eight colleges in Tasmania.

== District schools ==
There are 26 district schools or district high schools. These schools are located in rural areas where primary and secondary education are taught on a single campus, usually ranging from kindergarten to Year 12 (K-12). A list of these schools is located at the list of district schools in Tasmania.

== Non-government schools ==
The non-government schools in Tasmania generally have a religious affiliation, such as Catholic Education Tasmania, although the involvement of the sponsoring organisation varies between schools. The schools differ in the format of public schools and offer a range of year levels. A list of these schools is located at the list of non-government schools in Tasmania.

== Homeschool education ==
Tasmania has an active homeschooling community. Homeschool families in Tasmania must be registered with the Tasmanian Home Education Advisory Council (THEAC), which is an advisory and monitoring board which reports to the Minister for Education. In 2012 there were 660 homeschooling students registered in Tasmania, giving Tasmania the highest ratio of homeschooled students to students in traditional schools (6.4 per 1000 children) in Australia.

== Tertiary education ==
The largest public education institution in Tasmania is the University of Tasmania, with major campuses at Newnham (in Launceston) and Sandy Bay (in Hobart), along with a north-west centre in Burnie. TasTAFE (formerly known as TAFE Tasmania) also offers tertiary qualifications across multiple locations within Tasmania.

== School terms ==
The academic year in Tasmania generally runs from the beginning of February until mid-December for primary and secondary schools, and for colleges exams start early in November. Tasmanian schools operate on a four-term basis. Schools are closed for the Tasmanian public holidays.

== See also ==
- List of schools in Tasmania
- Department for Education, Children and Young People
- Education in Australia
