= Department for Education, Children and Young People =

Tasmanian government department

Department overview
- Formed: 17 July 1989
- Preceding agencies: Education Department; State Library
- Type: Government department
- Jurisdiction: Tasmanian Government
- Headquarters: 4 Salamanca Place, Hobart
- Employees: 13,293 (March 2026)
- Annual budget: $1.893 billion (2026-27 FY)
- Minister responsible: Jo Palmer, Minister for Children and Youth and Minister for Education
- Department executive: Ginna Webster, Secretary
- Website: www.decyp.tas.gov.au

The Department for Education, Children and Young People (DECYP) is a government department within the Government of Tasmania with responsibility for Government schools, child and family learning centres, child safety and out of home care, youth justice services, libraries and the Tasmanian archives.

The department is led by its Secretary, Ginna Webster.

== History ==
The department was formed on 17 July 1989, from the amalgamation of the Education Department and the State Library and was known as the Department of Education and the Arts.

On 27 March 1996, parts of other departments responsible for community and cultural development were amalgamated with the department and the name was changed to the Department of Education, Community and Cultural Development.

On 9 May 1998, the Department of Vocational Education and Training was amalgamated with the department and the name was changed to the Department of Education, Training, Community and Cultural Development.

On 18 September 1998, the parts of the department responsible for community and cultural development were amalgamated with other departments and the name was changed to the Department of Education.

On 1 July 2014, Skills Tasmania (responsible for vocational education and training) was amalgamated with the Department of State Growth.

On 1 October 2022, the children and youth related parts of the Department of Communities Tasmania were amalgamated with the department and the name of the department was updated to the Department for Education, Children and Young People.

== School system ==
The department is responsible for Government schools in Tasmania.

Schools in the public education system include: 138 primary schools (Kindergarten to Grade 6), 57 high schools (Grade 7 to 10) and 8 colleges (Grade 11 and 12).

== State Library ==
The headquarters of the State Library of Tasmania is located in Hobart. The State Library administers and funds all public libraries in Tasmania. There are 7 city/suburban lending libraries and 39 smaller branch libraries located throughout Tasmania. The State Library also maintains the heritage and reference collections.

== See also ==
- Department of Education and Training (Australia)
- List of schools in Tasmania
- List of Tasmanian government agencies
- University of Tasmania
