= List of Tasmanians =

This is a list of notable Tasmanians, by birth or association.

== Arts ==
- Philanthropist - David Walsh
- Actors - Simon Baker, Errol Flynn, Alison Whyte, Jaason Simmons, Rachael Taylor, Chris King, Robert Grubb, Lucky Grills, Essie Davis, Phillip Borsos, Don Sharp, Cleo Massey, Toby Leonard Moore, Jessica Green
- Producers/Directors - Robert Jarman, Posie Graeme-Evans
- Choreographers - Graeme Murphy
- Composers - Matthew Dewey, Maria Grenfell, Don Kay, Constantine Koukias, Thanapoom Sirichang, Douglas Knehans, Peter Sculthorpe, John Joseph Woods
- Musicians - Eileen Joyce, Courtney Barnett, Monique Brumby, Striborg, Psycroptic, Luca Brasi (band), The Bedroom Philosopher, The Innocents, The Paradise Motel, Asta, Kim Dracula, The Wolfe Brothers (country band)
- Comic artist - Sols (Alan Salisbury),
- Comedians - Hannah Gadsby, Luke McGregor
- Fictional - Tasmanian Devil
- Painters - Geoffrey Dyer, John Glover
- Photographers - Peter Dombrovskis, Olegas Truchanas
- Television - Charles Wooley, Peter Cundall
- Writers - Richard Davey, Richard Flanagan, Peter Conrad, Christopher Koch, Margaret Scott, Nan Chauncy, Bradley Trevor Greive, Tansy Rayner Roberts, Sara Douglass
- Fashion designer - Alannah Hill
- Engravers - Richard Jarman
- Animators - Felix Colgrave
- Scultptors - Betty Isaacs

== Historic ==
- Alfred Beresford, Anglican archdeacon
- Martin Bryant, perpetrator of the 1996 Port Arthur Massacre
- Alec Campbell, longest surviving war veteran from the Battle of Gallipoli
- George Clarke, University of Tasmania's first vice-chancellor May 1890 to May 1898, and chancellor from May 1898 to May 1907
- William Field, convict turned businessman
- Harold Gatty, navigator and aviation pioneer
- John Gellibrand, founder of Legacy Australia
- Dorothy Edna Genders, Anglican deaconess, early woman pioneer in church leadership
- Jane Franklin early Tasmanian pioneer
- Georgina Kermode, suffragette and engineer
- Daniel Priest, Australian convict
- Ettie Rout, journalist and wartime sexual health campaigner
- Fanny Cochrane Smith, Aboriginal Tasmanian
- Truganini, Aboriginal Tasmanian

== Politics ==
- Federal - Michael Ferguson, Mark Baker, Dick Adams, Lance Barnard, Neal Blewett, Bob Brown, Brian Harradine, Dame Enid Lyons, Joseph Lyons, Michael Hodgman (later a state politician), Ken Wriedt, Kevin Newman, Jocelyn Newman
- State - Jim Bacon, Paul Lennon, Eric Reece, Will Hodgman, Michael Field, Ray Groom (previously federal), Robin Gray, Doug Lowe, Bill Neilson
- Other - Andrew Inglis Clark, Richard Jones

== Sport ==
- Association football - Alex Cisak
- Athletics - Stewart McSweyn
- Basketball - Chris Goulding
- Australian rules football - Matthew Richardson, Alistair Lynch, Darrel Baldock, Ian Stewart, Peter Hudson, Laurie Nash, Paul Williams, Roy Cazaly, Steven Febey, Nick Riewoldt, Jack Riewoldt, Russell Robertson, Brad Green, Daryn Cresswell, Rodney Eade, Royce Hart, James Manson, Viv Valentine, Verdun Howell, John Klug, Andrew Phillips, Doug Barwick, Jeremy Howe, Brody Mihocek
- Chess - Ian Rogers
- Cricket - David Boon, Ricky Ponting, Max Walker, Ben Hilfenhaus, Tim Paine, Ted McDonald, George Bailey, Xavier Doherty, Lily Poulett-Harris, Matthew Wade
- Cycling - Richie Porte, Amy Cure
- Motor racing - Marcos Ambrose, John Bowe
- Netball - Natasha Chokljat
- Rugby Union - Adam Coleman, Justin Collins, Ollie Atkins, Eric E. Ford, Jack Ford, Eddie Jones
- Rowing - George Quinlan Roberts
- Sailing - Laura Roper
- Swimming - Ariarne Titmus
- Tennis - Richard Fromberg
- Other - David Foster (woodchopping)

== Science ==
- Elizabeth Blackburn, first woman from Australia to win a Nobel Prize
- Bill Mollison
- Frank Styant Browne (1854-1938), X-ray pioneer, first in Tasmania to produce X-rays

== Recent notables ==
- Phillip Aspinall, Anglican Archbishop of Brisbane and Primate of Australia
- Regina Bird, winner of Big Brother Australia 2003
- Dora Isabel Baudinet, (1883-1945) nurse and philanthropist
- Mary, Queen of Denmark
- Mathew Goggin, professional Tasmanian golfer on US PGA Tour
- Tim Lane, journalist and sports commentator
- Eric Philips, OAM, polar adventurer and guide
- Grace Tame, 2021 Australian of the Year, advocate for the prevention of child sexual assault.

== See also ==
- List of Indigenous Australian historical figures
