= Barbara Rae (cricketer) =

Australian cricketer and school teacher

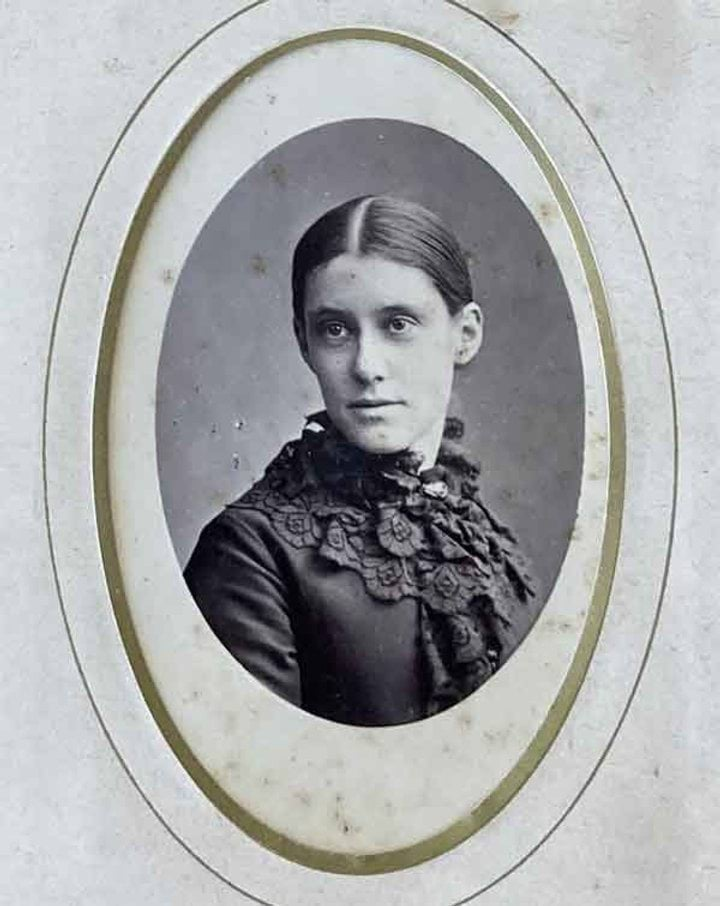
- Born: Barbara Rae; 1855; Bendigo, Victoria, Australia
- Died: 18 March 1891 (aged 35–36)
- Occupations: Cricketer, school teacher
- Years active: 1894–1896
- Known for: Captain and top scorer in Australia's first women's cricket match (1874)
- Cricket career

Cricket information
- Batting: Right-handed

Barbara Rae (1855 – 18 March 1891) was an Australian cricketer and school teacher. She is notable for organising Australia's first recorded women's cricket match, a charity fundraiser held on 7 April 1874 in Bendigo, Victoria. She also captained the winning team and was the top scorer in the match. Rae's role in this game and its follow-up match has made her an important figure in the early history of women's cricket in Australia.

== Early life and family ==
Rae was born in 1855 in Sandhurst (now Bendigo, Victoria). Her parents were John Rae and Helen (née Fincher).

She worked as a school teacher at Rae's Ironbark School in Bendigo, of which her father was the headmaster.

== Fundraising matches ==
=== Organisation and background ===
In 1874, John Rae proposed holding a women's cricket match to raise funds for the Bendigo Hospital and Benevolent Asylum.

After John Rae suggested the idea, the project was taken up by the women themselves. Barbara Rae acted as match secretary, recruited players, and organised coaching sessions at local grounds. She placed ads in the Bendigo Advertiser calling for women interested in playing in the cricket match, and two teams of eleven were easily formed. Players from the Bendigo United Cricket Club, which included several Australian representative cricketers, assisted with coaching.

=== 1874 Bendigo game ===
The first women's cricket match in Australia took place on 7 April 1874 during the Bendigo Easter Fair. It was a major fundraising event.

The two teams were distinguished by the colour of their jackets, red and blue. Rae, aged 19, captained the winning Blues team, finished as the top scorer, and was widely recognised as the player of the match. Her stepmother, Emily Rae, captained the opposing Reds team, and her sister Nellie Rae also played.

The Bendigo Advertiser praised the game writing that “such a remarkable event as a ladies’ cricket match had seldom happened, even in the old country—the home of cricket.” Local sports reporters were impressed with the playing standard, comparing it to that of prominent Australian cricketers such as Midwinter, Beswick, Allan, and Wills.

The game, which raised significant funds for charity, was considered a success by thousands of the attendees.

However, within days, the players faced strong criticism in some Melbourne and Victorian regional newspapers, which published hostile articles labelling the event “unseemly” and “deplorable”.

=== Second game in 1875 ===
A second match between the Blues and Reds took place on 31 March 1875 at the Bendigo Easter Fair, again attracting large paying crowds and favourable local coverage.

Despite the success, hostility from some Victorian newspapers persisted. The players were subjected to months of abuse in the media.

After the match, Barbara Rae encouraged Melbourne women to play a charity match, but the idea was ridiculed. On hearing this, Australian cricketer Tom Wills invited the Bendigo team to Geelong in support, though the players ultimately declined. The 1875 match is the last known appearance of the early Bendigo women cricketers.

== Death and legacy ==
Barbara Rae Archibald died on 18 Mar 1891 in Bairnsdale, Victoria, at the age of 36.

A book entitled Bowl the Maidens Over: Our First Women Cricketers by Louise Zedda-Sampson, published in 2021, tells the story of Rae's involvement in the first women's cricket match held in Australia, and the media responses of the time.

The Bendigo Historical Society's History House Museum hosted an exhibition in 2024 titled Frisky Matrons & Forward Spinsters: Australia's first women cricketers in Bendigo. The exhibition celebrated 150 years since the first recorded women's cricket match had taken place in 1874.

A bronze statue of Rae was commissioned as part of the Victorian Women's Public Art Program and installed in early 2026. The work was created by central Victorian sculptor Liz Johnson, who attended the official unveiling of the statue. Located at the entrance to Bendigo's Queen Elizabeth Oval, the statue acknowledges the significant role Rae played in the organisation of the first women's cricket match to be played in Australia. This is the first statue that honours a female cricketer in Victoria, and only the second in Australia.

Rae's role in the historic 1874 and 1875 matches is now seen by authors like Zedda-Sampson as a crucial step in women's cricket as it moved from being regarded as a 'male-only' sport.

Rae's two one-off fundraising games were played 20 years before the first women's league was formed.

The next major figure involved in the early days of women's cricket in Australia was the Tasmanian Lily Poulett-Harris (1873 – 1897). She founded the first women's cricket league in Australia in 1894.

The Victoria Women's Cricket Association was founded in 1905, and the Australian Women's Cricket Association in 1931. The current competition is run by the Women's National Cricket League.

== See also ==
- List of women cricketers
- Women's cricket in Australia
- Cricket in Australia
- Cricket in Victoria
- Women's sport in Australia
- Lily Poulett-Harris
