= Deep Bay, Tasmania =

Deep Bay
- Town
- Coordinates: 43°12′25″S 147°08′17″E
- Country: Australia
- State: Tasmania
- Region: South-east
- LGA: Huon Valley
- Location: 28 km (17 mi) S of Huonville

Government
  - State electorate: Franklin
  - Federal division: Franklin

Population
  - Total: 231 (2016 census)
- Postcode: 7112
Localities around Deep Bay
Gardners Bay	Gardners Bay	Gardners Bay
Port Cygnet	Deep Bay	Garden Island Creek
Abels Bay	Randalls Bay	Garden Island Creek

Deep Bay is a rural locality in the local government area (LGA) of Huon Valley in the South-east LGA region of Tasmania. The locality is about 28 kilometres (17 mi) south of the town of Huonville. The 2016 census recorded a population of 231 for the state suburb of Deep Bay.

== History ==
Deep Bay is a confirmed locality.

== Geography ==
Much of the western boundary follows the shoreline of Port Cygnet.

== Road infrastructure ==
Route B68 (Channel Highway) runs through from north-west to south.
