= Gardners Bay, Tasmania =

Gardners Bay
- Town
- Coordinates: 43°10′48″S 147°07′52″E
- Country: Australia
- State: Tasmania
- Region: South-east
- LGA: Huon Valley
- Location: 26 km (16 mi) SE of Huonville

Government
  - State electorate: Franklin
  - Federal division: Franklin

Population
  - Total: 329 (2016 census)
- Postcode: 7112
Localities around Gardners Bay
Coastal waters	Nicholls Rivulet	Woodbridge
Coastal waters	Gardners Bay	Woodbridge, Birchs Bay
Coastal waters	Deep Bay, Garden Island Creek	Garden Island Creek

Gardners Bay is a rural residential locality and a body of water in the local government area of Huon Valley in the South-east region of Tasmania. It is located about 26 kilometres (16 mi) south-east of the town of Huonville. The 2016 census recorded a population of 329 for the state suburb of Gardners Bay.

== History ==
Gardners Bay was gazetted as a locality in 1971.

== Geography ==
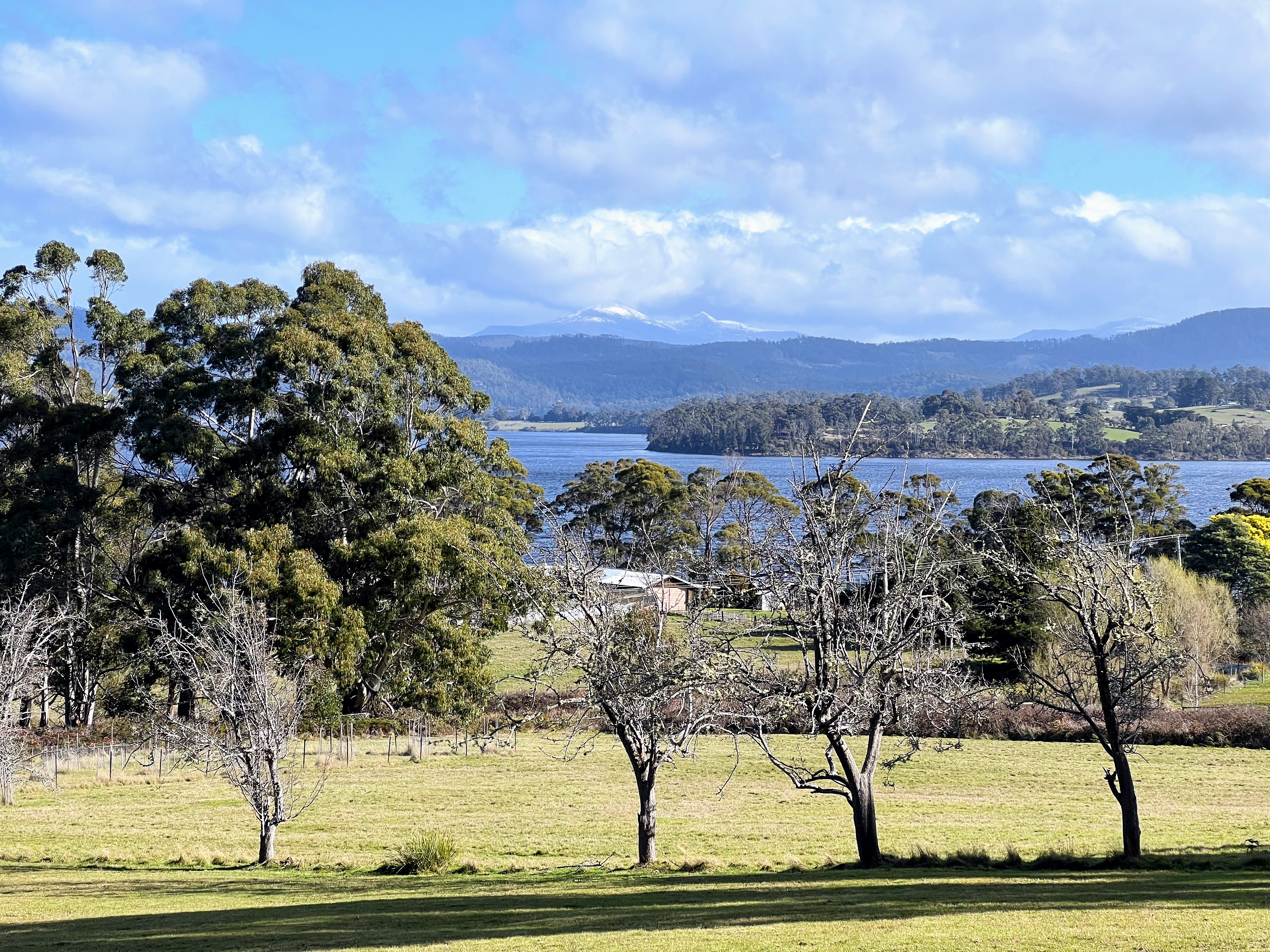
A view of Gardners Bay and Hartz Mountains

The waters of Gardners Bay and Purcells Bay form the western boundary. Gardners Bay (the body of water) and Purcells Bay are inlets of Port Cygnet.

== Ecology ==
=== Flora and fauna ===
Threatened species found in Gardners Bay include the eastern quoll, Tasmanian devil, eastern barred bandicoot, Tasmanian wedge-tailed eagle, and the Mount Mangana stag beetle.

== Road infrastructure ==
The B68 route (Channel Highway) enters from the north-west and follows the coast to the south-west, where it exits. Route C627 (Woodbridge Hill Road) starts at an intersection with B68 and runs east through the locality until it exits at the eastern boundary.
