= Henry Harris (Australian cricketer) =

Australian cricketer (1865–1923)

Vere Poulett-Harris
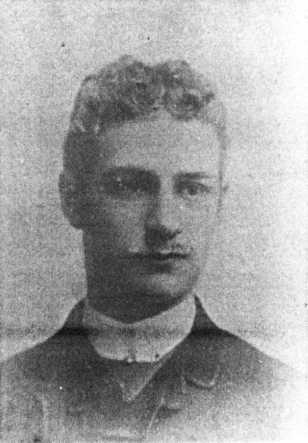

Personal information
- Full name: Henry Vere Poulett-Harris
- Born: 22 April 1865; Hobart, Tasmania
- Died: 7 March 1923 (aged 57); Perth, Western Australia
- Batting: Right-handed
- Relatives: Lily Poulett-Harris (sister), Richard Deodatus Poulett-Harris (father)

Domestic team information
- Years: Team
- Tasmania cricket team
- Western Australia cricket team

Career statistics
Competition	FC
Matches	5
Runs scored	226
Batting average	22.60
100s/50s	0/1
Top score	60
Catches/stumpings	3/–
- Source: Cricinfo, 4 February 2015

Henry Vere Poulett-Harris (22 April 1865 – 7 March 1933) was an Australian cricket player, runner, footballer, gold prospector and gold mine owner. Vere Poulett-Harris played five first-class cricket matches for the Tasmania and Western Australia cricket teams between 1883 and 1899.

One early news report described him as a "sterling cricketer and footballer" whilst another described him as a "sterling batsman and good field."

Vere Poulett-Harris' father was Richard Deodatus Poulett-Harris, an educationalist, priest, the founder of the Masonic Lodge in Tasmania and the co-founder of the University of Tasmania. Amongst his other activities, Richard was passionate about cricket and, in 1882, was elected a trustee of the Southern Tasmanian Cricket Association. Furthermore, he encouraged the boys at the high school of which he was the headmaster to compete at sports.

Vere Poulett-Harris left Tasmania to study medicine but ended up working for a time as a bank clerk at Charters Towers before becoming a gold prospector. By 1898, he was prospecting in Western Australia.

He discovered the Corinthian gold mine in the Yilgarn Gold Field of Western Australia and was also one of the first people to prospect at Burtville. He wrote an account of the discovery of Corinthian which was published in a newspaper of the time.

In 1911, he was called as a witness to testify during Chaffinch Mine Conspiracy trial.

Vere Poulett-Harris' obituary states that he was "one of the outstanding athletes in the State, winning great success as a runner, cricketer and footballer. He played cricket for the Wellington Club and was regarded as one of the most graceful batsmen in the State. He was a member of the State team when a youth, and toured New Zealand with the Tasmanian team under the captaincy of the late Sir George Davies. Later he met with success as a batsman on the mainland. He was also a champion footballer and a member of the Cricketers' Football Club, some of his contemporaries being Messrs. W. H. Cundy, L. H. Macleod, K. E. Burn, A. Stuart and G. Watt. As a runner he defeated many of the recognised champions of his day."

Despite being over the age limit, Harris enlisted in the Australian Imperial Force, and served in the Great War with the 10th Light Horse.

He died aged 67, leaving no wife or children. His younger sister, Lily Poulett-Harris, founded women's cricket in Australia.

== See also ==
- Richard Deodatus Poulett-Harris
- Lily Poulett-Harris
- Woodbridge, Tasmania
- List of Tasmanian representative cricketers
- List of Western Australia first-class cricketers
