= Fanny Cochrane Smith =

Aboriginal Tasmanian woman (1834–1905)

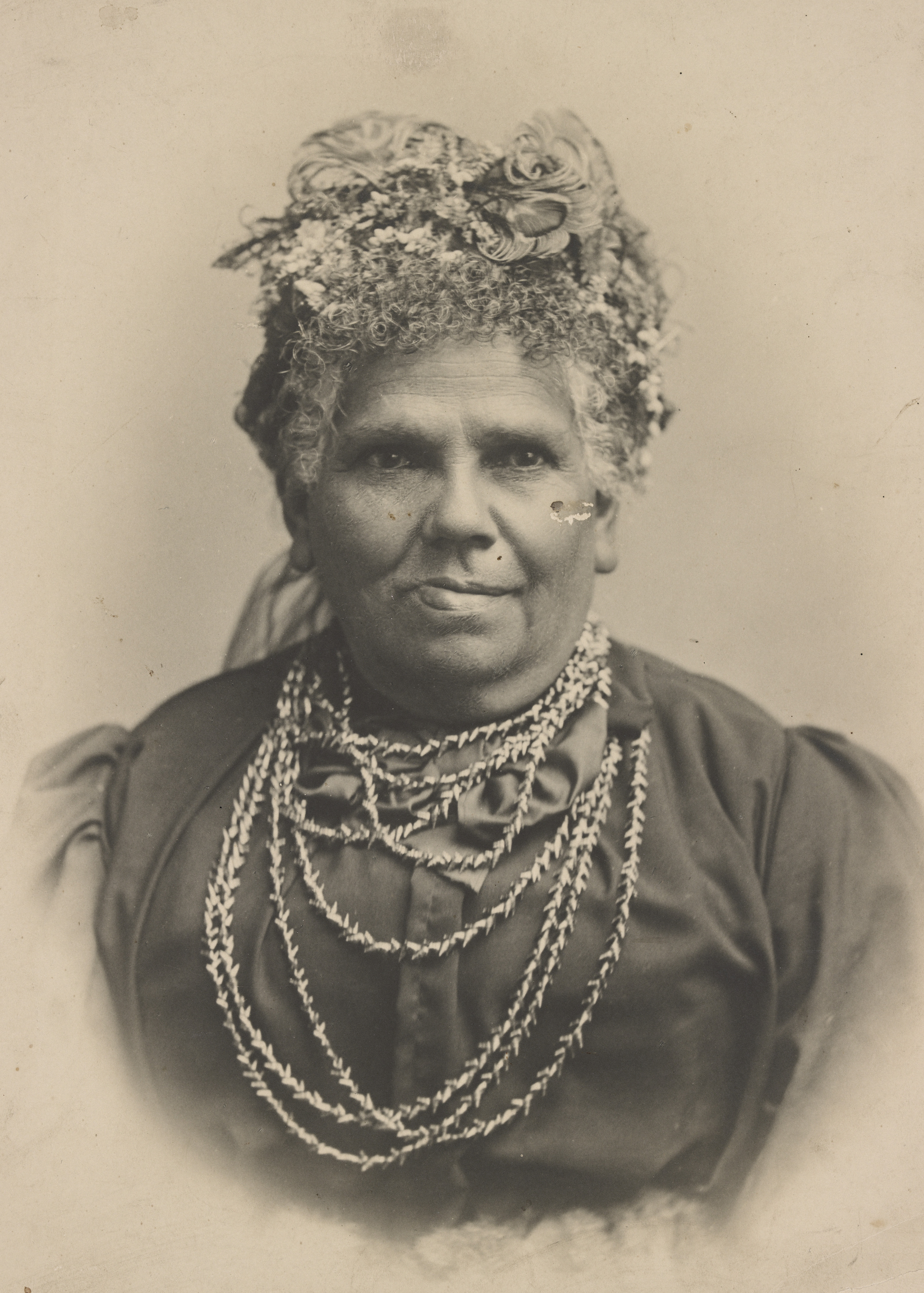
- Smith c. 1900
- Born: Fanny Cochrane; December 1834; Flinders Island, Tasmania, Australia
- Died: 24 February 1905 (aged 70); Port Cygnet, Tasmania, Australia
- Spouse: William Smith (m. 1854; died 1902)
- Children: 11
- Mother: Tanganutara
- Cochrane's voice Cochrane singing Tasmanian Aboriginal songs, 1903

Fanny Cochrane Smith (née Cochrane; December 1834 – 24 February 1905) was an Aboriginal Tasmanian (Palawa) woman considered to be the last fluent speaker of an Aboriginal Tasmanian language. Born at the Wybalenna Aboriginal Establishment in 1834, she married in 1854 and spent much of her life in Port Cygnet. She attracted fame due to claims that she was the last surviving "full-blooded" Aboriginal Tasmanian, and was subjected to studies and public debate over her Aboriginal identity. She also became known for her public performances of Aboriginal songs.

In 1899 and 1903 Smith recorded songs on wax cylinders, producing the only known recordings by a fluent speaker of an Aboriginal Tasmanian language. These recordings are held by the Tasmanian Museum and Art Gallery and were added to the Australian Memory of the World Register in 2017. Many members of Tasmania's present-day Aboriginal community are descended from Smith.

== Biography ==
=== Early life ===
Fanny Cochrane was born in early December 1834 at the Wybalenna Aboriginal Establishment on Flinders Island, Tasmania. She was the daughter of Tanganutara, also known as Sarah, who had been abducted from the Cape Portland area in 1815 and then traded among sealers. While living with European sealers, Tanganutara gave birth to four children. She later lived at Wybalenna with an Aboriginal man named Nicermenic, also known as Eugene, where she gave birth to another three children, including Fanny. During her childhood, Fanny—the first child born at Wybalenna—developed a knowledge of Aboriginal Tasmanian languages, songs, and traditions from her mother, and from fellow residents who represented a variety of Tasmanian language groups. She may have spent parts of her early childhood living with the island's catechist, Robert Clark.

At the age of seven she was enrolled at the Queen's Orphan School in Hobart, where she was trained as a domestic servant in a rigid institutional setting. By the age of 12 she was working as a servant for Clark on Flinders Island, where she was abused and poorly treated. Cochrane was labelled an "unruly" child and was chained and beaten due to accusations of theft and attempted arson of the Clarks' home. At around the age of 12 or 13, she reported to Clark that she had been repeatedly raped by a convict named Thomas Warham. She told him that Warham had forced her to steal supplies and to assist in his attempts to burn down the home. While the island's superintendent examined Fanny and confirmed that she had been raped, the Clarks blamed her regardless and forced her to sleep in a small trunk as punishment.

In 1847 the Wybalenna Aboriginal Establishment was disestablished and its 46 surviving inhabitants were moved to Oyster Cove. Cochrane was sent to Hobart to work as a domestic servant, but soon rejoined her mother and sister at Oyster Cove. On 27 October 1854 she married a sawyer and ex-convict named William Smith in Hobart after her application to marry was approved by the Tasmanian government. She was granted a pension of £24 to substitute for the costs of keeping her at Oyster Cove, as well as to incentivise her husband to treat her well.

=== Family and Aboriginal identity ===
Shortly after their marriage, Fanny and William moved to Hamilton to work for a man named William Clarke. Around 1857 they returned to Hobart, where Fanny began running a boarding house and assisting her husband in operating his shingle splitting business. Her brother Adam, who had been living with them, died unexpectedly at the age of 20 in 1857; Fanny and William moved to Nicholls Rivulet near Oyster Cove soon after. Fanny gave birth to her first child, William Henry Jr., on 1 August 1858; by 1874 she had given birth to a total of six sons and five daughters. By then William's health had declined, leaving him unable to work. Fanny appealed without success to the Tasmanian government for an increase to her pension.

In May 1876, Truganini—with whom Smith had grown close—died. Truganini was widely regarded as the last surviving "full-blooded" Aboriginal Tasmanian, and upon her death the Tasmanian government declared that the Aboriginal population was extinct. In 1882, a newspaper article was published stating that Smith was in fact the last surviving Aboriginal Tasmanian. The article quickly sparked debate about her Aboriginal status and the identity of her father. Smith took the opportunity to once again petition the Tasmanian parliament for an increase to her pension.

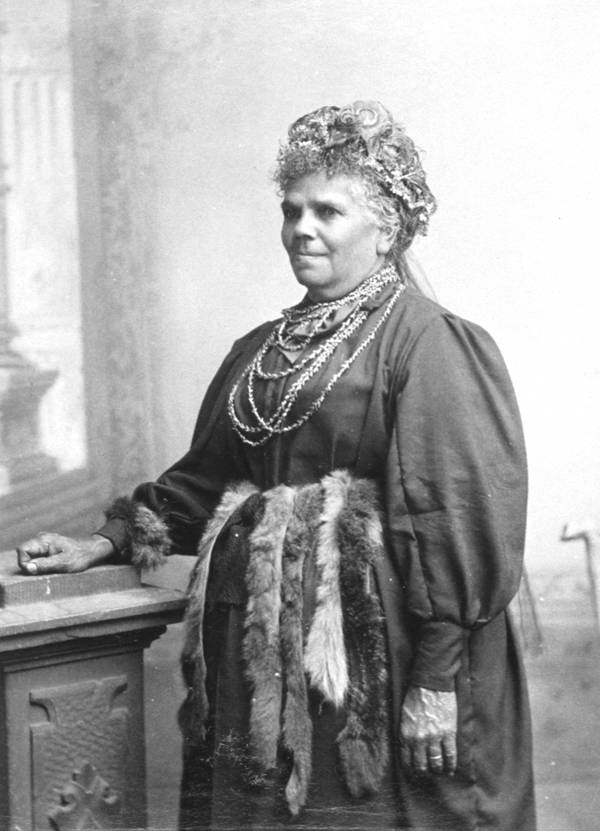
Smith wearing shell necklaces and a belt with wallaby pelts

The petition led some to argue that Smith was a "half-caste" and should therefore not be eligible for a government pension. In September 1882, a parliamentary sitting took place to determine whether she should continue to receive her pension. Some witnesses claimed that Smith's parents were both Aboriginal, while others claimed that she was of mixed Aboriginal and European descent. The sitting resolved that Smith's pension should be increased to £52. In 1884, Smith applied for a grant of 500 acres of land, sparking renewed debate about her Aboriginal identity. After a lengthy debate, in 1889 she was ultimately granted a total of 305 acres of land.

In 1889, the ethnographer James Barnard told the Royal Society of Tasmania that he had confirmed through his research that Smith's father was Nicermenic, an Aboriginal man. In 1891, the anthropologist Henry Ling Roth began studying Smith to determine whether she was a "full-blooded" Aboriginal woman. In 1894, Smith gave him her photographs and hair samples. Roth concluded based on these photographs and samples that she was a "half-caste" and presented his findings to the Royal Society of Tasmania in 1898.

=== Later life ===
Smith was a devout Methodist and hosted church services in her home, as well as donating some of her land for the building of a church. She also became well-known for her performances of Aboriginal songs. In 1899, Smith began performing a series of public benefit concerts, where she was described as the "last of the Tasmanian aboriginal race".

On 24 February 1905 Smith died in Port Cygnet of pneumonia and pleurisy. More than 400 people attended her funeral.

== Legacy ==
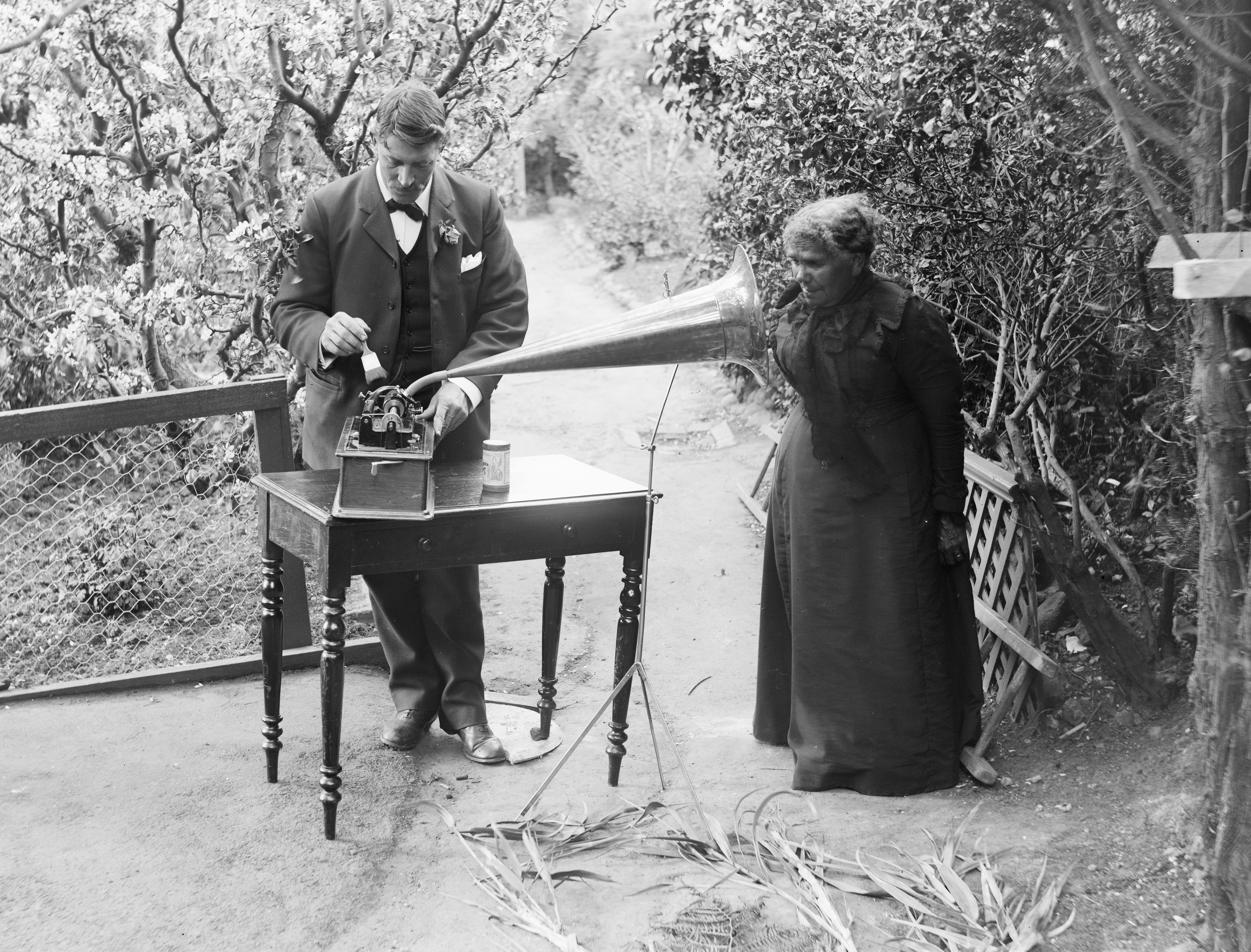
Smith recording songs for the ethnographer Horace Watson in 1903

In 1899 and 1903 Smith recorded Aboriginal Tasmanian songs on wax cylinders, creating the only known recordings by a fluent speaker of an Aboriginal Tasmanian language. In 1899, the Royal Society of Tasmania recorded four wax cylinders: the first contains a recording and translation of the Spring Song, the second contains a recording of the Corroboree Song and a recounting of Smith's life story, and the fourth contains speeches by members of the Royal Society. The contents of the damaged third cylinder are unknown. In 1903, Horace Watson recorded seven additional wax cylinders, which are now held by the Tasmanian Museum and Art Gallery. Smith's wax cylinder recordings have been used in the development of Palawa Kani, a constructed language created as a language retrieval project by the modern Tasmanian Aboriginal community. In 2017 the recordings were added to the Australian Memory of the World Register, part of UNESCO's Memory of the World Programme.

Smith was the only resident of the Wybalenna Aboriginal Establishment and Oyster Cove to later have children, and the present-day Tasmanian Aboriginal community includes a large number of her descendants. She is considered to have been the last surviving fluent speaker of any of the original Aboriginal Tasmanian languages. Baskets made by Smith are held by museums in Australia and overseas.

== See also ==
- Truganini
- List of Indigenous Australian historical figures
