= Abels Bay, Tasmania =

Abels Bay
- Town
- Coordinates: 43°13′44″S 147°06′19″E
- Country: Australia
- State: Tasmania
- Region: South-east
- LGA: Huon Valley
- Location: 32 km (20 mi) S of Huonville

Government
  - State electorate: Franklin
  - Federal division: Franklin

Population
  - Total: 127 (2021 census)
- Postcode: 7112
Localities around Abels Bay
Port Cygnet	Deep Bay	Deep Bay
Port Cygnet	Abels Bay	Randalls Bay
Eggs and Bacon Bay	Eggs and Bacon Bay	Randalls Bay

Abels Bay is a rural locality in the local government area (LGA) of Huon Valley in the South-east LGA region of Tasmania. The locality is about 32 kilometres (20 mi) south of the town of Huonville. The 2021 census recorded a population of 127 for Abels Bay.

== Geography ==
The western boundary follows the shoreline of Port Cygnet, an inlet of the Huon River estuary.

== Road infrastructure ==
Route B68 (Channel Highway) runs along the north-eastern boundary. From there, Abels Bay Road provides access to the locality.
