= Lily Poulett-Harris =

Australian sportswoman and educationalist

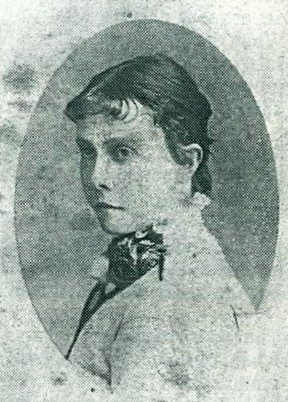
- Photograph of Poulett-Harris from the 1890s
- Born: Harriet Lily Poulett-Harris; 2 September 1873; Hobart, Colony of Tasmania
- Died: 15 August 1897 (aged 23); Hobart, Colony of Tasmania
- Occupations: Cricketer, teacher
- Years active: 1894–1896
- Cricket career

Cricket information
- Batting: Right-handed

Lily Poulett-Harris (2 September 1873 – 15 August 1897) was an Australian sportswoman and educationalist, notable for being the founder of the first women's cricket league in Australia. She captained the Oyster Cove team in the league. She continued to play until forced to retire due to ill health from tuberculosis, a disease that would eventually claim her life at the young age of 23.

== Early life ==
Born Harriet Lily Poulett-Harris (but referred to in all subsequent sources as Lily) on 2 September 1873, she was the twin and youngest daughter of Richard Deodatus Poulett-Harris and his second wife, Elizabeth Eleanor (née Milward). Her father was renowned for being the head of the Hobart Boys' High School on the Queens Domain and a founding father of the University of Tasmania, so it is no surprise that she and several of his other children followed him into careers in education.

She had English, French and American Loyalist ancestry on her father's side of the family, being descended from an illegitimate child of John Poulett, 4th Earl Poulett and a Frenchwoman. The Pouletts were an Anglo-Norman noble family. Lily was a direct descendant of Amias Paulet, an Elizabethan Puritan who was a Huguenot supporter and who served the Queen as a diplomat and Governor of Jersey and as the gaoler of Mary, Queen of Scots.

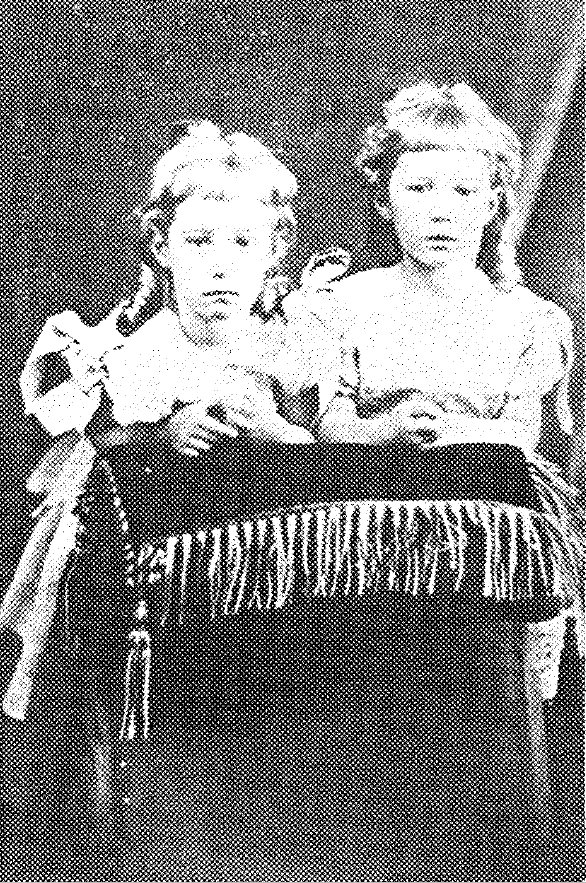
Lily Poulett-Harris (left) and her twin sister, Violet, as children.

Richard's father, Charles, was born in Paris and later joined the Royal Navy. He was at Trafalgar but did not fight as he was transporting dispatches at the time of the battle. He was later captured as a prisoner of war and, upon his release, transferred to the army and was subsequently stationed in Canada as a captain in the 60th Regiment where he married Anna Maria Van Stout, an American Loyalist refugee. Whilst the couple was in Nova Scotia, Richard was born to them. Upon returning to England, Charles became a notable linguist, schoolmaster and bookseller.

Lily was a cousin of the Welsh diplomat and Governor of Newfoundland, Sir Charles Alexander Harris. (Later, in 1922, he was appointed Governor-General of Australia but turned the role down due to his wife's poor health.)

Lily's mother was a Tasmanian of English descent, whose father had been Chief Clerk in the Royal Engineers' Department and, later, the colony's Official assignee. Her mother's aunt had married into the Huguenot de Teissier family and her cousin was Baron James de Teissier. Lily's mother was born at Tessierville House in Patrick Street, West Hobart in 1833. Her mother was 39 and her father was 57 when Lily and her twin Violet were born.

As a young child Lily grew up at Domain House in Hobart, where her father's high school was based.

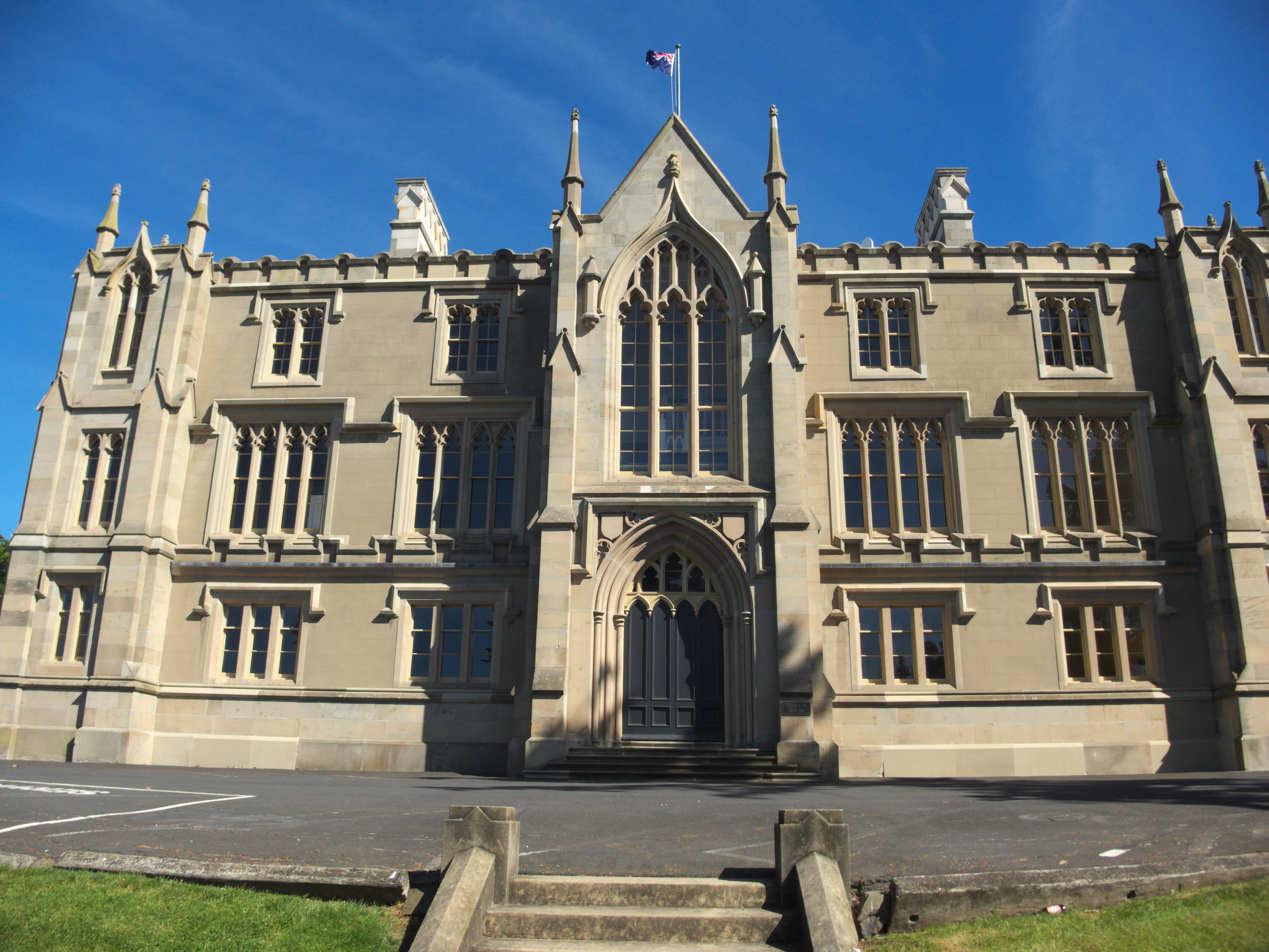
Old Hobart High School (Domain House).

Lily's father, Richard, was also the assistant rector at Holy Trinity Church, North Hobart.

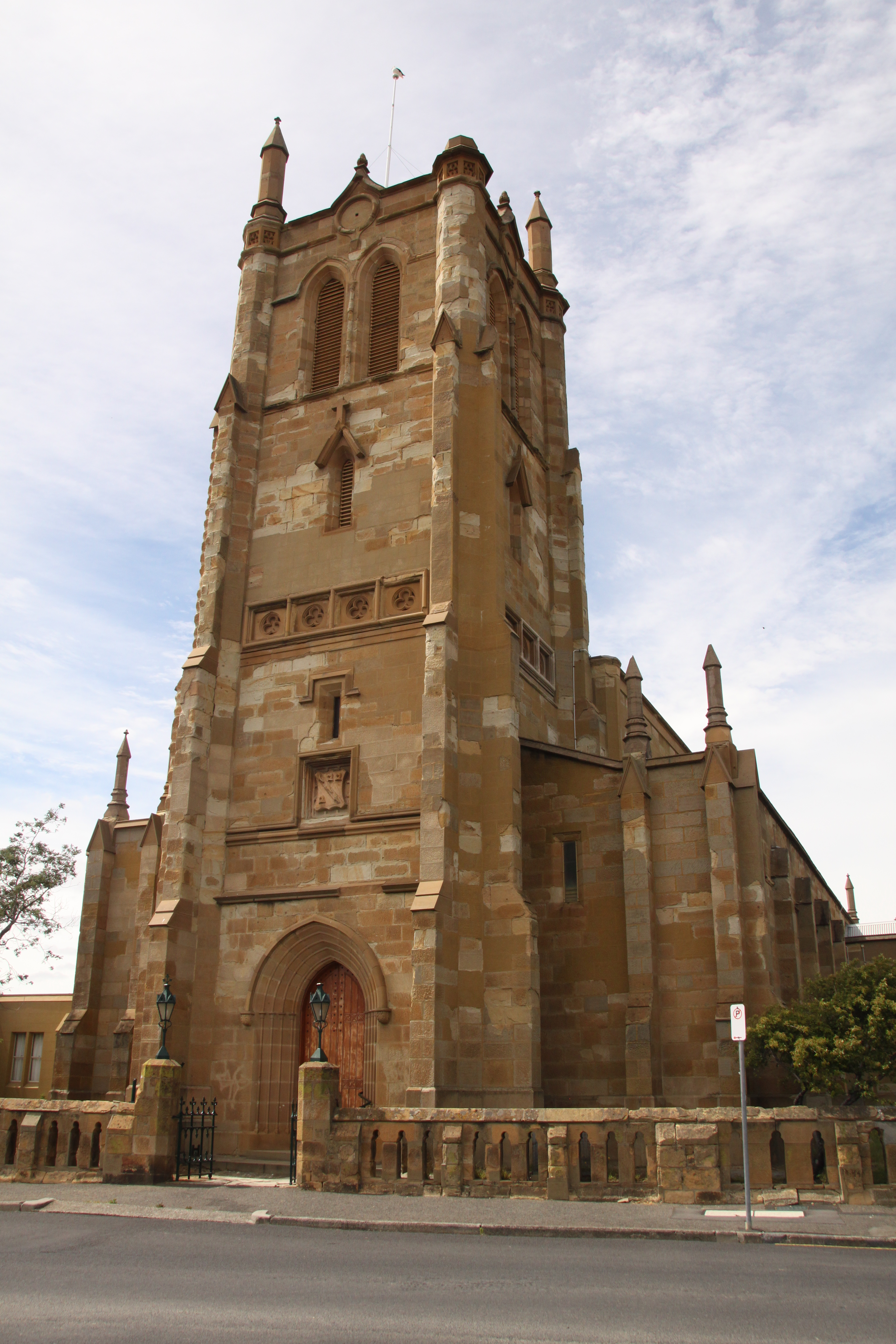
Holy Trinity Anglican Church, Warwick Street, North Hobart.

Richard was a vocal opponent of secular education. He was a member of the British and Foreign Bible Society. Lily grew up in this devout, resolutely evangelical (low church) Anglican environment.

Life must have been difficult at times for Lily growing up. Her father, who had arrived in Tasmania in 1856, was "melancholy in outlook and prone to depression, he had much sadness in his family life. He mourned the separation from the three daughters left in England [from his first marriage] and the early death of his son Richard from severe burns. His second daughter Charlotte Maria became of unsound mind [and] was committed to an institution in February 1872..."

Furthermore, Richard "was charged with assaulting boys with a cane in March 1860 and June 1868, the first case being dismissed and the second settled out of court, but he maintained the school's pre-eminent position in the colony until 1878 when he lost his midlands boarders to Horton College and Launceston Church Grammar School. Thereafter his health declined and in 1885, suffering acute physical pain and mental depression, he surrendered to Christ College, with the shareholders' agreement, all leasehold rights in return for an annuity of £300. The school was closed on 15 August 1885."

"[A] bright, inquisitive, adventurous and active child", Lily was schooled by her father and received a Level II mark prize in December 1882. Lily was allowed to sit the major exams as a "trial of strength" in 1884 even though she was not eligible for a scholarship. She came second.

She also played the violin at school. She would go on playing this instrument, and also the piano, all of her life, giving occasional public performances at Peppermint Bay and Hobart. For instance, she gave a recital at a church choir fundraising event at her home parish of All Saints in South Hobart less than a year before she died.

When her father retired in 1885, he purchased a hotel at Peppermint Bay (Woodbridge) and converted it into a house which he named "The Cliffs". The property was fifteen acres, including orchards and paddocks.There were also numerous outbuildings. Lily spent her adolescence and young adulthood here. The family also spent many holidays in Launceston where Richard "was held in great esteem".

=== Saving her mother from fire ===
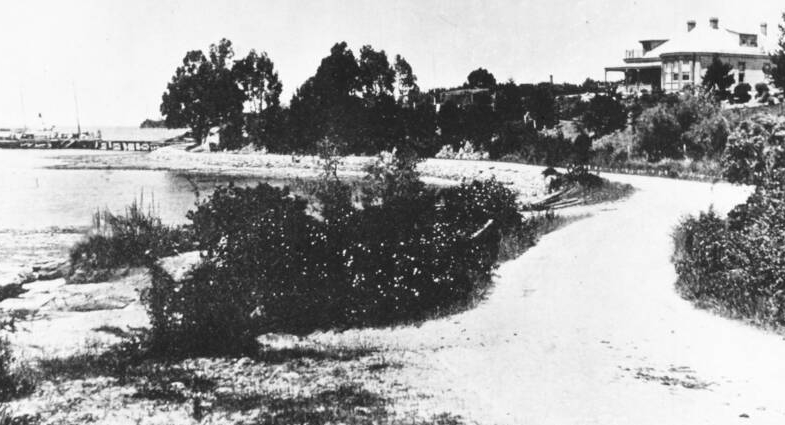
The house at Peppermint Bay where Lily Poulett-Harris grew up. It was formerly a hotel but was purchased by her father and converted into a homestead in 1885.

However, the first indication of Lily's strength of character came in November 1885, when she was twelve years old. One day, "Miss May Harris, with her two little sisters, Violet and Lily, and Miss Gaynor, a guest, went down to the beach to bathe, and a little while afterwards Mrs. Harris followed them down to look after them. On her way to the beach, and when, a little way only from it, her attention was caught by some brushwood and dry grass which she thought might harbour snakes. She accordingly set fire to it with the hope of removing it, and was still engaged in the operation, when she suddenly – the fire having spread without her noticing it – found that her dress had caught ablaze, and that the sleeves were burning. This was the first intimation she had of her danger, and she at once screamed out, and rolling herself on the ground, tried to put out the fire in that way. Lily, the younger of the twins, was the only one near enough to assist her mother, and rushing up, the little child had the presence of mind to pull off her wet bathing dress and wrap it round her mother's body, thus saving her from much worse injuries than those she received. Mrs Harris was taken home, and was found to be suffering from severe burns on the arms and back."

== Cricketing career ==
Lily's older brother, Henry Vere Poulett-Harris (1865–1933) was a gifted footballer, runner and cricketer, and he eventually represented both Tasmania and Western Australia in first-class cricket in a career spanning the 1883–84 to 1898–1899 seasons. One early news report described him as a "sterling cricketer and footballer" whilst another described him as a "sterling batsman and good field."

Indeed, his obituary states that he was "one of the outstanding athletes in the State, winning great success as a runner, cricketer and footballer. He played cricket for the Wellington Club and was regarded as one of the most graceful batsmen in the State. He was a member of the State team when a youth, and toured New Zealand with the Tasmanian team under the captaincy of the late Sir George Davies. Later he met with success as a batsman on the mainland. He was also a champion footballer and a member of the Cricketers' Football Club, some of his contemporaries being Messrs. W. H. Cundy, L. H. Macleod, K. E. Burn, A. Stuart and G. Watt. As a runner he defeated many of the recognised champions of his day." It was his interest in sport that appears to have spurred Lily on.

Another influence would have been her father who, in 1882, was elected a trustee of the Southern Tasmanian Cricket Association and, in 1883, became its vice-president. Furthermore, he encouraged the boys at the high school to compete at sports. With his approval, his students had assisted in clearing the upper cricket ground on the Domain.

As her own obituary notice states, Lily "was a great admirer of athletic exercises, firmly believing that it was very necessary to develop the physical as well as the mental part of our nature. Cricket had her warm sympathy and support... she was a good horsewoman and cyclist."

She had also volunteered as an athletics starter in 1893.

Lily's cricket aspirations led her to found a cricket league for local women in 1894. This is despite the fact that, as recently as 1890, the major local newspaper, the Hobart Mercury, had criticised the idea of women's cricket with regard to a match held in London, noting that, "Altogether, we think the success of the ladies' cricketing teams is very doubtful; or, if they do succeed, it will be on lines that one hardly cares to write about; and for private amusement the game cannot hold a candle to tennis as an appropriate female pastime. If the rising female generation must have more violent exercise than their grandmothers, surely they need not disregard the proprieties in securing it; or, if they do, they will have to pay the penalty by vacating the dignified womanly pedestal their grandmothers occupied in the minds of all good men."

Lily's new league included the Oyster Cove Ladies' Cricket Club for which she played. This league was, according to a contemporary news report, the first female cricket league in the Australian colonies. She was unanimously elected captain and "she was remarkably successful in piloting her team to many a victory." The other teams that were then established in the league included Atalanta (Hobart Quakers), Heather (Hobart) and North Bruny. The following year, Green Ponds, Ranelagh and Huonville would join the competition. As well as playing each other, the Ladies' team supported male cricketers by providing luncheons for them and playing music at concerts. These were most often held at Kettering's Selby Hall. By the December of the following year, the ladies' competition had become well-established, a Hobart sports journalist noting that "[interest in cricket] seems to be growing, and extending to the weaker sex, who often have a quiet match upon a romantic little plateau on the Domain immediately beyond the upper cricket ground."

Her sporting career is well-documented in the newspapers of the time. She was generally either the opening or third-order batswoman. The early sports journalism of the era consistently praised her performances, with such comments as a "prettily played innings" on one occasion and, on another, "The feature of the match was undoubtedly the fine not out innings of Miss L. Poulett-Harris, captain of the winning team, who, going in first, carried her bat right through the innings for 64 runs."

In May 1894, a Tasmanian correspondent for a Melbourne newspaper reported that "The ladies' cricketing season was concluded at Oyster Cove on 6 May, with a match between the Oyster Cove and North Bruni [sic] clubs, resulting in a win for the local team by an innings and 41 runs. The past season has been very successful, consequently, the outcome has been good cricket and high scoring. The captain of the Oyster Cove C. C., Miss L. Poulett-Harris, heads the batting list with the remarkably good average of 32.6; her batting throughout the season has been very good. She has also the honour of having put up the record for Tasmania, making 64 (not out) in an innings (which included five fours), and 78 in a match. Miss K. Denne, North Bruni C. C., comes next with an average of 18 runs."

In 1895, Lily was described in one match as having "batted in good style, her contribution being well earned for the winners."

She also bowled. On one occasion her bowling was described by the Hobart Mercury's sports journalist as "very good indeed" when she got two opponents out for a total of one run between them.

The teams did not adopt the "rational dress" that had become popular in some women's sports overseas by that time. Rather, "they all appear[ed] in prim summer dresses, and present[ed] a pretty picture."

In May 1895, a special exhibition game was played at the TCA Ground consisting of "teams of ladies chosen from the Heather, Bruni, Oyster Cove, and Atlanta clubs. For the last two, seasons these clubs have had a good deal of practice, the result of which was plainly to be seen in yesterday's play. The game was organised by the Drapers' and Grocers' Assistants' Association in aid of the funds of the Hobart Regatta Association". The newspaper article goes on to report that "the attendance was fairly good, over 200 persons being present. The fair sex were there in large numbers to see how their sisters shaped in a public exhibition of their skill. The teams styled themselves the "Magpies," and the "Jackasses"... They were a fine healthy-looking bevy, variously dressed, a dark skirt with white blouse being the most predominant apparel... On the whole the display of cricket was fairly good, in fact far superior to what the majority of the spectators expected to see. The batting was vigorous, and in two or three instances very effective, boundary hits being by no means uncommon. The fielding was also good, particularly that of one of the "'Magpies." The bowling was mostly underhand, and would have been more deadly had the wickets been pitched at 16yds instead of the customary 22yds. Occasionally a round-arm over was sent down, and two of the ladies appeared, to have a good idea of this style of trundling. Nothing whatever occurred that could offend the most decorous, but it was plainly exemplified to all that however improper football may be for the weaker sex, cricket is an exercise can do nothing but improve them".

== Teaching career ==
Lily's older sister, Eleanor (known as Nellie), a "brilliant" scholar, taught at the Hobart Ladies' College and then at her father's home before founding the Ladies' Grammar School and Kindergarten at 26 Davey Street in 1894 (opposite Franklin Square). Lily and Violet were both to teach there.

Lily left Peppermint Bay to teach there in December 1894. At the time that she and her sister Nellie left, a newspaper correspondent reported they were presented with a dinner and tea service by local inhabitants, including members of the cricket club. The reporter went on to state, "There is a general feeling of regret throughout the district at the Misses Poulett-Harris leaving, as they have always taken a deep interest in the Bay and its institutions and inhabitants, and they carry with them the sincerest wishes of all that they will prosper in the new school life on which they are entering in Hobart."

A violinist, Lily took the music classes at the school. Among the music the school children learnt were a piece by Haydn and one of Greig's Humoresques. She lived at the school itself, having permanently relocated to the city from Peppermint Bay. However, "when scholastic duties permitted her to visit her home at the Cliffs she was always welcomed by young and old alike" and she continued to play for Oyster Cove. The school initially had ten pupils but, within a few years, grew to have seventy. It was very well regarded throughout its existence.

In 1895, the Hobart Mercury stated, "The Ladies' Grammar School, since it has been under the management of Miss [Nellie] Poulett-Harris, has made great progress, and is now one of the high-class seminaries in the South. The Poulett-Harris family have laboured long and well for the cause of higher education in Tasmania... The high tone of the school was especially commented upon, and Miss Poulett-Harris remarked that she attached more value to that than the turning out of girls distinguished for their cleverness." The Hobart Mercury noted their students had a "cultured appearance".

When she visited her home town, Lily was still actively involved in social and church activities. She also volunteered to decorate the church.

She evidently also became a congregant at All Saints in Macquarie Street in South Hobart at this time as well, this church being a relatively short distance from the school. Although it is an Anglo-Catholic parish today, the minister there at that time, Samuel Bucknell, was a low church Protestant. Richard had preached there on at least one occasion too. It was known as "the working man’s church" at that stage of its history.

== Personality ==
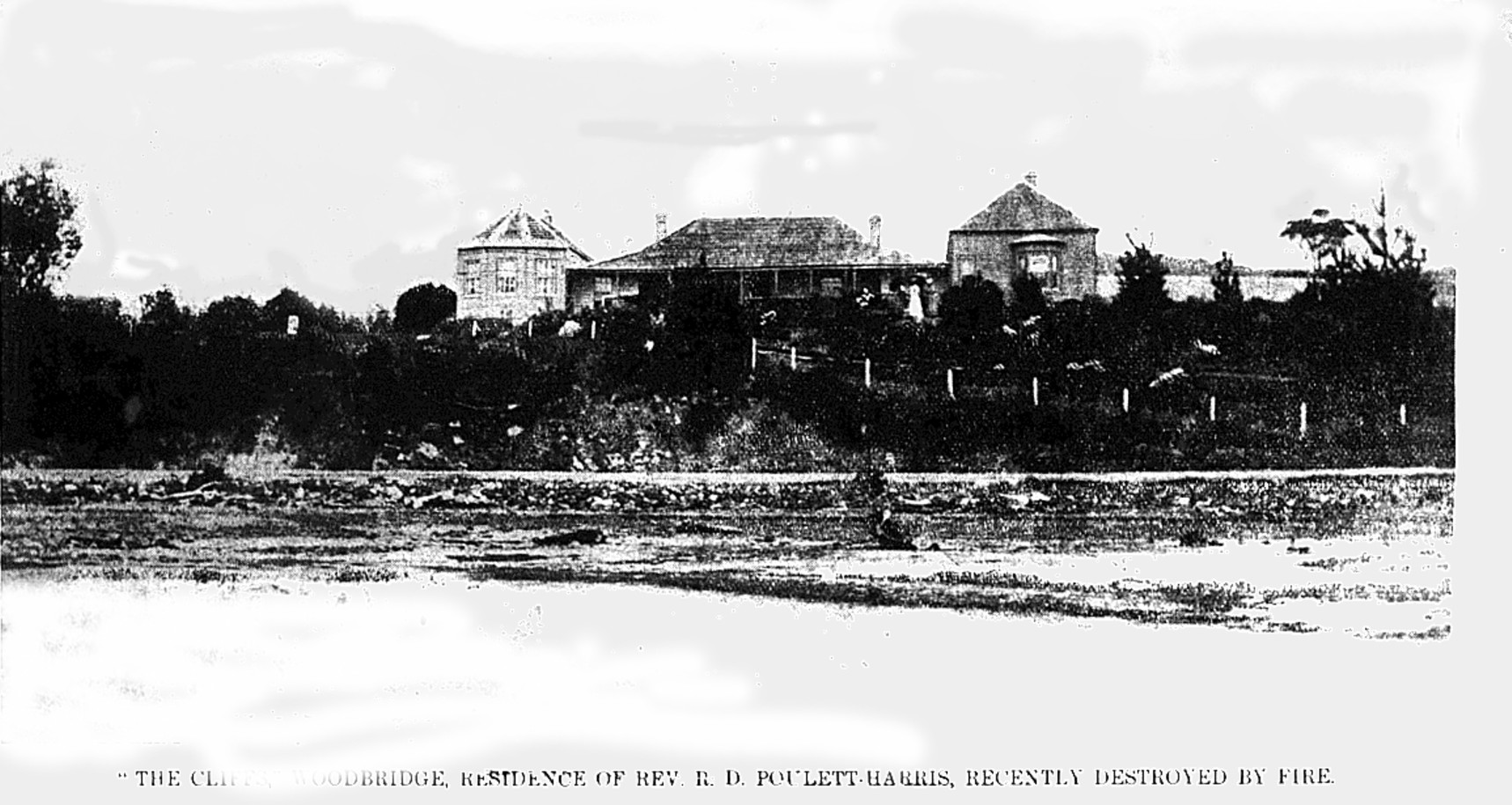
Lily Poulett-Harris' home at Peppermint Bay. Photograph taken in 1886. The caption refers to the fire that destroyed much of the home in 1896.

A fire in October 1896 destroyed most of the Poulett-Harris homestead at Peppermint Bay. The family only just escaped with their lives. As a result of the destruction, most of Richard Deodatus Poulett-Harris' papers were lost, including any references to his youngest daughter's life. However, from her obituary and a few other sources, some insights can be gained into her personality.

The obituary states that "Miss Lily was of a mirthful and happy disposition, ever endeavoring to make those with whom she came in contact – and those not a few – cheerful and happy also."

The obituary also contains the following anecdote: "One old man tells how she stopped and obliged by cutting up some tobacco for him, and by many of such little acts and kindnesses, Miss Lily endeared herself to the whole community."

It goes on to quote a member of her cricket team who said that "Fear... was a thing unknown to her."

A memorial plaque dedicated to Lily can be found on the rear wall of All Saints' Anglican Church in South Hobart. Donated by the teachers and students of the Ladies' Grammar School and Kindergarten, it describes Lily as "bright and lovable".

There is also a plaque dedicated to her memory at Saint Simon and Saint Jude Anglican Church in Woodbridge.

== Death ==
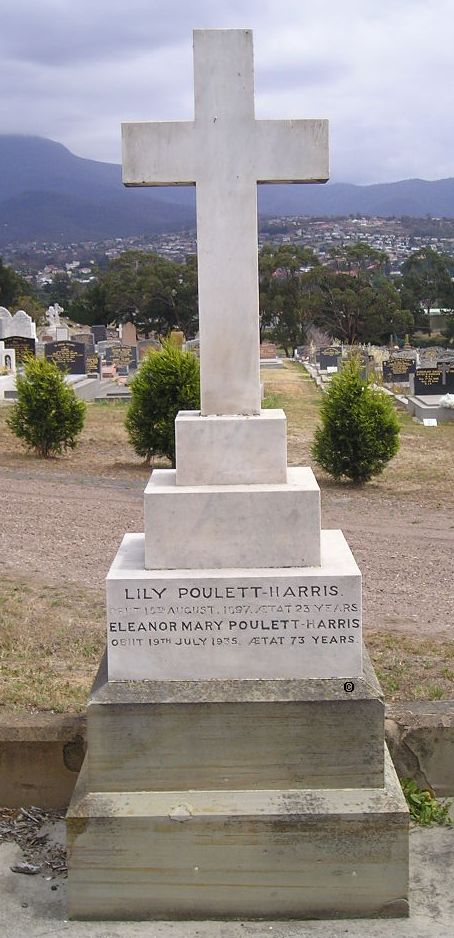
Lily Poulett-Harris' grave in 2007

Lily Poulett-Harris died on the evening of 15 August 1897 at the school's 26 Davey Street address after what her obituary described as "a painful illness". Her death certificate indicates it was tubercular peritonitis. The coffin was six feet tall but only 22 inches wide, indicating she was emaciated.

She was 23 years and eleven months of age. She was buried at 3:00 pm on 17 August 1897 in an Anglican service. Her grave is located at Plot J80, Cornelian Bay Cemetery, Hobart. (Her father and her sister Nellie were later buried in the same plot.)

== Family and legacy ==
Although the Oyster Cove Ladies' Cricket Club no longer exists, Australia still has an active women's cricket culture, including a national team. Inspired by the success of the Oyster Cove Ladies' Cricket Club and the southern Tasmanian competition, clubs were quickly formed in other parts of Tasmania, such as those at Swansea and Cranbrook on the east coast and Oatlands and York Plains in the midlands.

At the same time as these newer clubs were being created in Tasmania, a Rockhampton Ladies' Club was formed in Queensland. By the end of the 1890s, cricket and rowing two of the most popular competitive sports for women in Australia. Following this, the Victoria Women's Cricket Association was founded in 1905 and the Australian Women's Cricket Association in 1931. The current competition is run by the Women's National Cricket League.

The Ladies' Grammar School and Kindergarten moved to Albuera Street, Battery Point, in 1898 and was run by Nellie Poulett-Harris until her retirement in December 1919. She opposed the Australian dialect, reflecting the beliefs of the 1890s Elocution Movement. In 1905, the Hobart Mercury noted, "It would be difficult to overestimate the value of the good example set by Miss Poulett-Harris in teaching the children under her charge habits of thoughtfulness for others which may prove of incalculable benefit to them in after life". According to the Hobart Mercury, the school "occupied a foremost place in the city for a quarter of a century... in [Richard's] worthy and esteemed daughter the same benign influence in moulding the minds and characters of young girls had been displayed for many years." She was also the first vice-president of the Tasmanian Secondary Teachers' Association.

A woman of "charming disposition", Nellie was also involved in many charities, including Hobart City Mission, The Mission to Seafarers' "Harbour Lights Guild" in Campbell Street of which she served as honorary secretary in the 1920s, The Victoria League, the Melanesian Mission, the local convalescent home, the local consumptive sanatorium and the Ministering Children's League for which she also served as secretary. She also volunteered to help raise funds for the All Saints kindergarten and organ fund under Reverend T. K. Pitt.

Nellie was also musical and one of her achievements was to have trained the Peppermint Bay Anglican Church choir. She often returned to Woodbridge in the 1900s to relax and study and her family's contributions to the town's fame were noted at the time.

Lily and Nellie's older half-sister, Georgiana Ingle, became the first headmistress of Christchurch Girls' High School.

Charlotte died at the New Norfolk mental asylum in 1941.

Vere, like Lily, was both talented at music and possessed strong horse skills and he was in the Light Horse in the First World War. Before the war, he was a prospector and hotel owner. After it, he owned a Western Australian gold mine. He died in 1933.

Another half-sister, Katherine Poulett-Harris, married Justin Browne, the oldest son of the Archdeacon of Launceston. He was a merchant, manager of Perpetual Trustees, consular-agent for France, a director of the Hobart Gas Company, a chairman of the Chamber of Commerce, a Warden of the Hobart Marine Board, a Lands Title commissioner, a Fellow of the Royal Society of Tasmania, a trustee of the Tasmanian Museum and Botanical Gardens, a member of the executive committee of the Hobart Benevolent Society and was also heir to an estate in County Cork, Ireland. Remembered in her newspaper obituary as an extremely intelligent and deeply religious lady, Katherine died in 1940.

Lily's older sister, Anna May, born 1869, married Brian Gaynor, the Assistant Treasurer of the Straits Settlements. She went on to become a relatively well-known actress on the Australian theatre circuit, under the stage name Mary Milward. She was also a journalist and playwright and later held an editorial position on a Sydney newspaper before emigrating to the United Kingdom.

Lily's twin sister, Violet, also became an actress. She trained in Shakespearean theatre in Tasmania and then in England before leaving it behind to focus on light comedy. She was a founding member of a Hobart comedy club.

She performed musical monologues. For these she gained much acclaim. She was even compared to Mel B. Spurr. She occasionally composed her own verses for her monologues. She was also a pianist and vocalist.

She was a member of the Women's National Club, which was an early Tasmanian subsidiary of the Australian Women's National League.

She was involved in Hobart's hunting community and attended the Hobart Cup at Elwick Racecourse. She also maintained her links with Woodbridge.

She supported the National Council of Women of Australia the Royal Hobart Show, the Hobart Women's Hospital and the Hobart Shakespearean Ball.

Violet and Nellie were both early members of the Queen Mary Club in Hobart.

In a letter to the editor of The Mercury newspaper, Violet declared her great admiration for Edward VII as a "peace-maker" and "ruler over the greatest Empire...", especially his attributes of diplomacy and tact because of which, she felt, the Edwardians had known peace.

She left Tasmania in 1909 to reside and perform in Melbourne.

By 1919, she was back in Tasmania working at Nellie's school, teaching elocution and drama. This included helping people suffering from stammering. "Vi[olet] always helped Nell in her schools though one pupil's memory was of her often tippling on the sly and her... nephew... thought her distinctly dotty as she grew older!"

By 1931, she was working as a governess for four young children. She died on 26 December 1941, at the Albuera Street address whilst Nellie died in the New Norfolk Asylum in July 1935 from arteriosclerosis and was buried by her Anglo-Catholic parish priest from All Saints South Hobart, T. K. Pitt, who had also presided at her retirement from teaching.

Lily's father, Richard, died on 23 December 1899. A plaque in his honour can be found in Holy Trinity Anglican Church, North Hobart and there is also a stained glass memorial window dedicated to him in Saint John's Launceston. There is also a memorial fountain in the grounds of the old campus of the University of Tasmania that is dedicated to him. Both Nellie and Richard were buried in the same plot as Lily, whilst Violet was cremated.

Lily's mother had extensive gardens at Peppermint Bay and won multiple awards at the Woodbridge Show for flower arranging. She did a lot of work for the advancement of the Woodbridge community, including involvement in Christmas and Empire Day celebrations and town strawberry fetes. She also contributed a great deal to the Holy Trinity and Woodbridge parish churches, superintended the Woodbridge Sunday School and was described by a newspaper journalist as "indefatigable in all good works". She died in 1907.

In 2013, Lily's contribution to women's cricket was discussed in a publication entitled, Skirting the Boundary: A History of Women's Cricket, written by a coach and commentator named Isabelle Duncan.

In March 2016, a new article on Lily appeared in Sydney's Daily Telegraph newspaper. Entitled "The Southern Stars owe a huge debt to the Tasmanian schoolteacher who became Australia's first female cricket star", the article recounts her life and examines her enduring legacy in terms of her ongoing impact on women's cricket in Australia, noting that she has been "responsible for inspiring many other women to take up the sport."

In 2017, The Weekly Times called her "the founding mother of women's cricket in Australia".

In 2020, she was documented in a book about women's cricket in Tasmania written by a former player, Jacqui Triffitt.

In 2021, she was inducted into the Tasmanian Honour Roll of Women.

Also in 2021, there was a proposal to rename the Woodbridge Oval after her.

A play about her life was performed in her hometown of Woodbridge in 2022.

In 2023, the Hobart Observer stated she "is the founder of women’s cricket in Australia and connected women of all ages and backgrounds in the sporting arena."

Also in 2023, she was the subject of a Google Doodle commemorating her 150th birthday.

In 2025, a special memorial plaque was installed next to her grave.

== See also ==
- Richard Deodatus Poulett-Harris
- Henry Vere Poulett-Harris
- Charles Alexander Harris
- Amias Paulet
- Barons de Teissier
- Woodbridge, Tasmania
- Holy Trinity Church, North Hobart
- Women's cricket
- List of women cricketers
- History of women's cricket
- History of Australian cricket
- Women's cricket in Australia
- Cricket in Australia
- Cricket Tasmania
- Women's National Cricket League
- List of Tasmanians

== Bibliography ==
- Browne, Justin (1887). Family Notes. Hobart: J. Browne.
- Duncan, Isabelle (2013). Skirting the Boundary: A History of Women's Cricket. Britain: Biteback Publishing. ISBN 1849546118.
- Howell, Max; Howell, Reet; Brown, David W. (1989). The Sporting Image, A pictorial history of Queenslanders at play. Brisbane: University of Queensland Press. ISBN 0-7022-2206-2.
- Hull, Peggy (1989). The Ark That Binds: Being the Ancestry of the Children of Henry Vere Seymour Gaynor and Florence Lilian Gaynor Back Four Generations. Epping: P. Hull. ISBN 073165515X.
