= History of women's cricket =

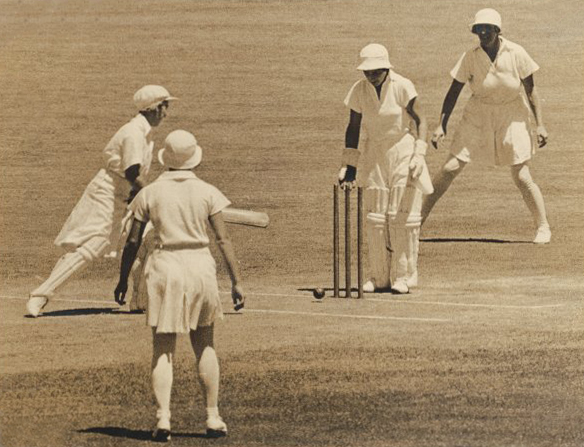
The 2nd Women's Test match between Australia and England in Sydney in 1935.

The history of women's cricket can be traced back to a report in The Reading Mercury on 15 Aug 1745 and a match that took place between the villages of Bramley and Hambledon near Guildford in Surrey.

The Mercury reported:

"The greatest cricket match that was played in this part of England was on Friday, the 26th of last month, on Gosden Common, near Guildford, between eleven maids of Bramley and eleven maids of Hambledon, all dressed in white. The Bramley maids had blue ribbons and the Hambledon maids red ribbons on their heads. The Bramley girls got 119 notches and the Hambledon girls 127. There was of bothe sexes the greatest number that ever was seen on such an occasion. The girls bowled, batted, ran and catches as well as most men could do in that game."

== Early years in England ==
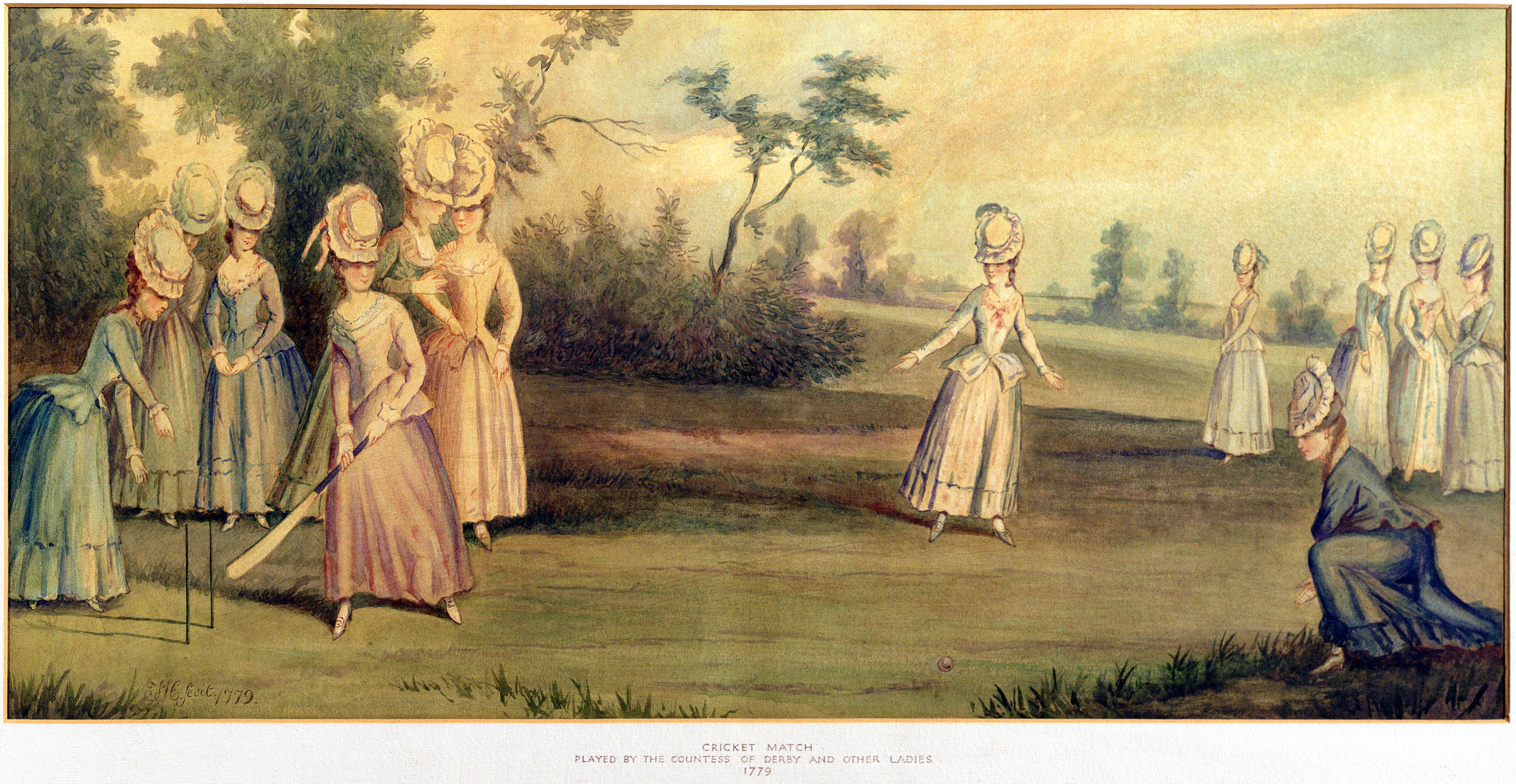
A 1779 cricket match played by the Countess of Derby and other ladies.

Early matches were not necessarily genteel affairs. A match, on 13 July 1747, held at the Artillery Ground between a team from Charlton and another from Westdean and Chilgrove in Sussex spilled over into the following day after it was interrupted by crowd trouble. Contemporary records show that women's matches were played on many occasions between villages in Sussex, Hampshire and Surrey. Other matches, often held in front of large crowds with heavy betting on the side, pitted single women against their married counterparts. Prizes ranged from barrels of ale to pairs of lace gloves. The first county match was held in 1811 between Surrey and Hampshire at Ball's Pond in Middlesex. Two noblemen underwrote the game with 1,000 guineas, and its participants ranged in age from 14 to 60.

Originally, cricket deliveries were bowled underarm. Legend has it that the roundarm bowling action was pioneered in the early 19th century by Christiana Willes, sister of John Willes, to avoid becoming ensnared in her skirts. In fact, roundarm was devised by Tom Walker in the 1790s.

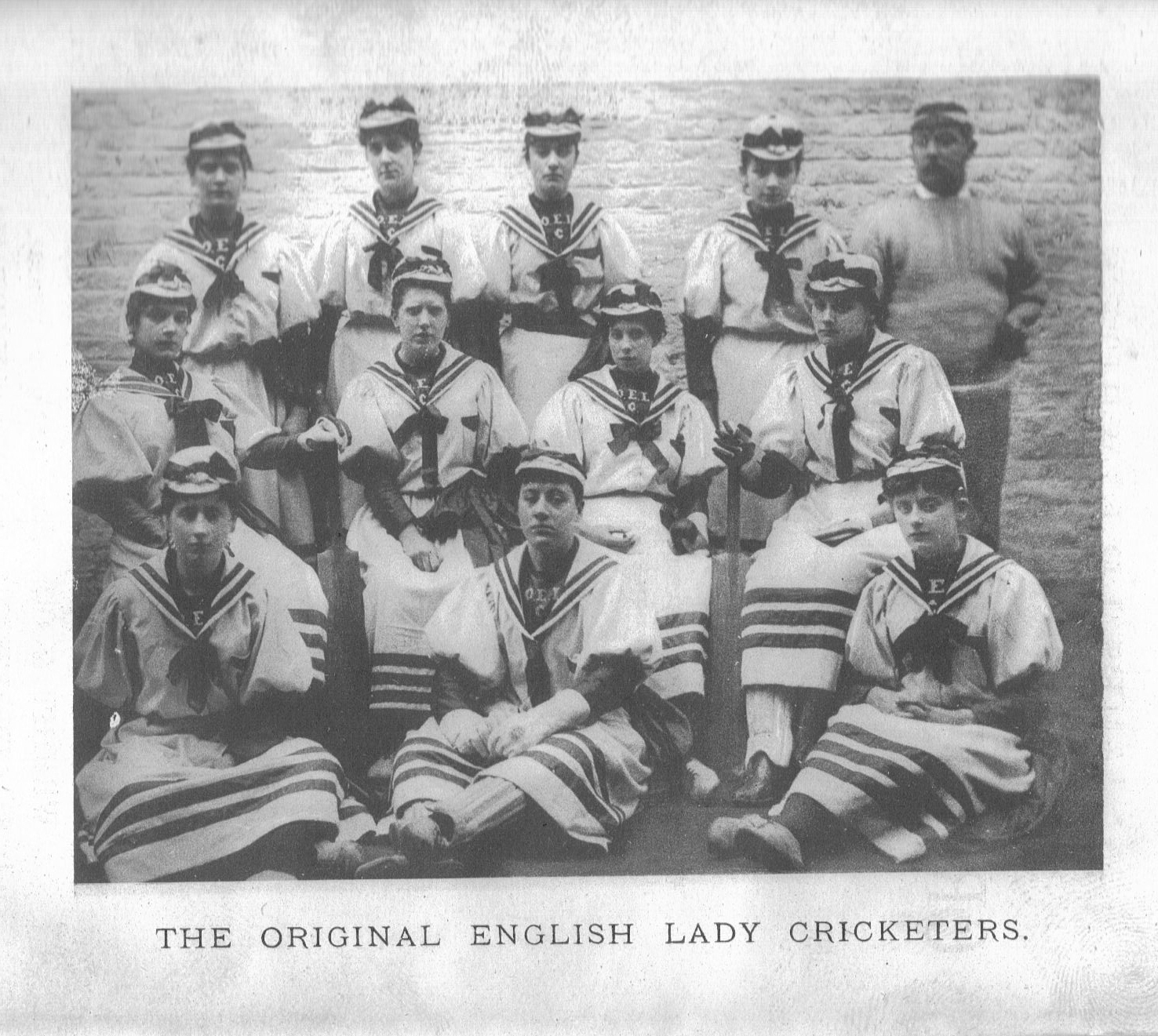
The Original English Lady Cricketers 1890

The first women's cricket club was formed in 1887 at Nun Appleton in Yorkshire and named the White Heather Club. In 1890, a team known as the Original English Lady Cricketers, toured England, playing in exhibition matches to large crowds. The team was highly successful until its manager absconded with the profits, forcing the ladies to disband. James Lillywhite's Cricketers' Annual for 1890 has a photograph of the team and short article on women's cricket. "As an exercise, cricket is probably not so severe as lawn tennis, and it is certainly not so dangerous as hunting or skating; and if, therefore, the outcome of the present movement is to induce ladies more generally to play cricket, we shall consider that a good result has been attained."

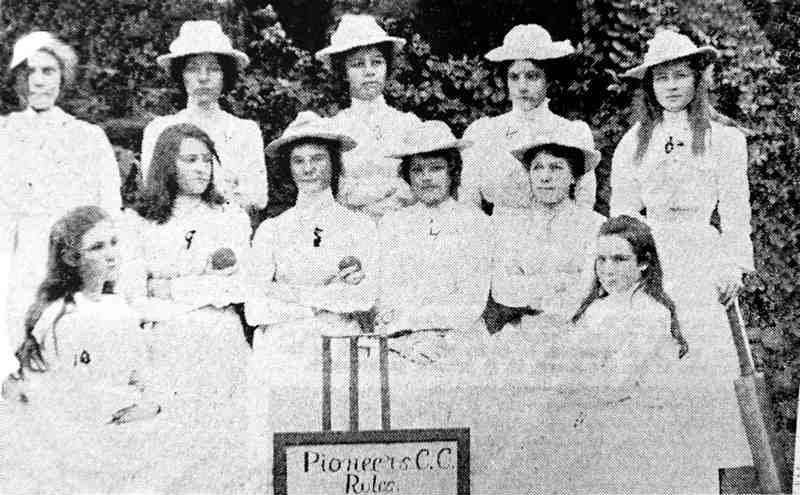
Pioneers Cricket Club, South Africa, 1902

The Women's Cricket Association was founded in 1926. The England team first played against The Rest at Leicester in 1933 and undertook the first international tour to Australia in 1934–35, playing the first Women's Test match between England and Australia in December 1934. After winning two tests and drawing one. England travelled on to New Zealand where Betty Snowball scored 189 in the first Test in Christchurch.

== Early years in Australia ==
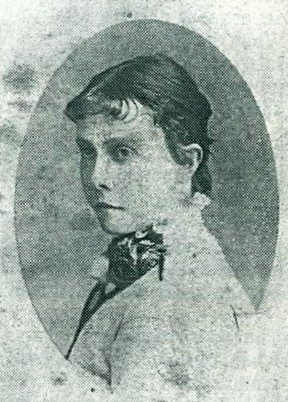
Photograph of Miss Lily Poulett-Harris, founding mother of women's cricket in Australia.

The founding mother of organised women's cricket in Australia was the young Tasmanian, Lily Poulett-Harris, who captained the Oyster Cove team in the league she created in 1894. Lily's obituary, from her death a few years later in 1897, states that her league was almost certainly the first to be formed in the colonies .

Prior to this there had only been occasional one-off games such as a charity fundraising match organised by Barbara Rae in Bendigo in 1874 and a match organised by the Gregory sisters in Sydney in 1886.

Following the establishment of Lily's southern Tasmanian league, the Victoria Women's Cricket Association was founded in 1905 and the Australian Women's Cricket Association in 1931. The current competition is run by the Women's National Cricket League.

== The spread to other countries ==
The International Women's Cricket Council was formed in 1958 to coordinate women's cricket which was now being played regularly in Australia, England, New Zealand, South Africa, the West Indies, Denmark and the Netherlands. Test cricket has now been played by Australia, England, India, Ireland, Netherlands, New Zealand, Pakistan, South Africa, Sri Lanka and the West Indies. 131 women's Test matches have been played to date, the majority featuring England or Australia. Originally these were three-day matches, but since 1985 most have been played over four days. England have played 87 Test matches since their first in 1934, winning 19, losing 11 and drawing 57. Australia have played 67 in the same period, winning 18, losing nine and drawing 40.

The highest total is Australia's 569 for six declared against England Women in 1998, and the highest individual score is the 242 recorded by Kiran Baluch for Pakistan Women against West Indies Women at the National Stadium, Karachi in 2003/04. Five other women have scored double centuries. Neetu David of India took eight wickets in an innings against England in 1995/56 and seven wickets have fallen to the same bowler on ten occasions. The best match figures, 13 for 226 were recorded by Shaiza Khan for Pakistan Women against West Indies Women in Karachi in 2003/04. Three English batsmen, Janet Brittin with 1935 runs at 49.61, Charlotte Edwards, 1621 at 49.09 and Rachel Heyhoe-Flint with 1594 at 45.54, head the all-time run scoring lists while six other women have scored more than 1,000 Test runs. Mary Duggan of England took 77 Test wickets at 13.49 while Australia's Betty Wilson took 68 at 11.8. Seven other women have 50 or more victims to their name.

Betty Wilson was the first player, male or female, to record a century and ten wickets in a Test match, against England at the MCG in 1958. In a remarkable match Australia were bowled out for 38 but gained a first innings lead of three in dismissing England for 35 in reply, with Wilson taking seven for seven. 35 remains the lowest total ever recorded in a women's Test. Australia, thanks to Wilson's century, set England 206 to win but the visitors held on for a draw. In 1985, Australia's Under-21 National Women's Cricket Championship was renamed the Betty Wilson Shield in her honour. Another phenomenal club performance saw right-hander Jan Molyneaux make a record 298 for Olympic v Northcote in Melbourne's A grade final in 1967. Molyneaux also made 252 not out on a separate occasion in a 477 run partnership with Dawn Rae, again for Olympic.

== Women's cricket in the modern era ==
Club and county cricket in England has undergone constant evolution. There is currently a National Knock-Out Cup and a league structure culminating in a Northern and Southern Premier league. The major county competition is the LV Women's County Championship, while Super Fours, featuring teams named after precious stones, bridges the gap for the elite players between domestic and international competition.

In April 1970, MCC's traditional Easter coaching classes at Lord's were attended by Sian Davies and Sally Slowe of Cheltenham Ladies' College (see photo in Wisden at Lord's, page 129) breaking the 'gender barrier'. The first Women's Cricket World Cup was held in England in 1973, funded in part by businessman Jack Hayward, and won by the hosts at Lords in front of Princess Anne. Enid Bakewell and Lynne Thomas, making their international debuts for England, scored unbeaten hundreds against an International XI in Brighton in a stand of 246, a record which stood for a quarter of a century . Lord's staged its first women's Test match in 1979, between England and Australia.

One-Day International cricket has been played by Australia, Denmark, England, India, Ireland, Japan, Netherlands, New Zealand. Pakistan, Scotland, South Africa, Sri Lanka and the West Indies while Jamaica, Trinidad and Tobago and International XIs have played in World Cups. 707 ODIs have been played up to the end of the 2009 World Cup. The 455 for 5 smashed by New Zealand Women against Pakistan Women at Hagley Oval, Christchurch in 1996/97 remains the highest team score while the Netherlands Women were bowled out for just 22 against West Indies Women at Sportpark Het Schootsveld in Deventer in 2008.

The Women's Cricket Association handed over the running of women's cricket in England to the England and Wales Cricket Board (ECB) in 1998. In 2005, after the eighth Women's World Cup, the International Women's Cricket Council was officially integrated under the umbrella of the International Cricket Council, and an ICC Women's Cricket Committee was formed to consider all matters relating to women's cricket. The 2009 World Cup, the first held under the auspices of the ICC was won by England, the first English team of either sex to win an ICC competition.

Women have beaten male teams to several milestones in one-day cricket. They were the first to play an international Twenty/20 match, England taking on New Zealand at Hove in 2004. The first tie in a one-day international was also between Women's teams, hosts New Zealand tying the first match of the World Cup in 1982 against England, who went on to record another tie against Australia in the same competition. Female wicket keepers were the first to record 6 dismissals in a one-day international, New Zealand's Sarah Illingworth and India's Venkatacher Kalpana both accounting for 6 batsman on the same day in the 1993 World Cup and Belinda Clark, the former Australian captain, is the only female player to have scored a double hundred in an ODI, recording an unbeaten 229 in the 1997 World Cup against Denmark. Pakistan's Sajjida Shah is the youngest player to appear in international cricket, playing against Ireland four months after her 12th birthday. She also holds the record for the best bowling figures in a one-day international, taking 7 wickets for just 4 runs against Japan Women at the Sportpark Drieburg in Amsterdam in 2003. Fast bowler Cathryn Fitzpatrick of Australia took 180 wickets in her one-day international career.

In 2009 England batsman Claire Taylor was named one of Wisden's five cricketers of the year , the first woman to be honoured with the award in its 120-year history.

Since at least 2017 the England and Wales Cricket Board has promoted a short-form variant known as women's softball cricket, which is played in several county leagues in England. The traditional game is sometimes referred to as "women's hardball cricket" where a distinction needs to be made.

== See also ==
- Lily Poulett-Harris – founder of women's cricket in Australia
