= Richard Deodatus Poulett-Harris =

Educationalist in England and Australia

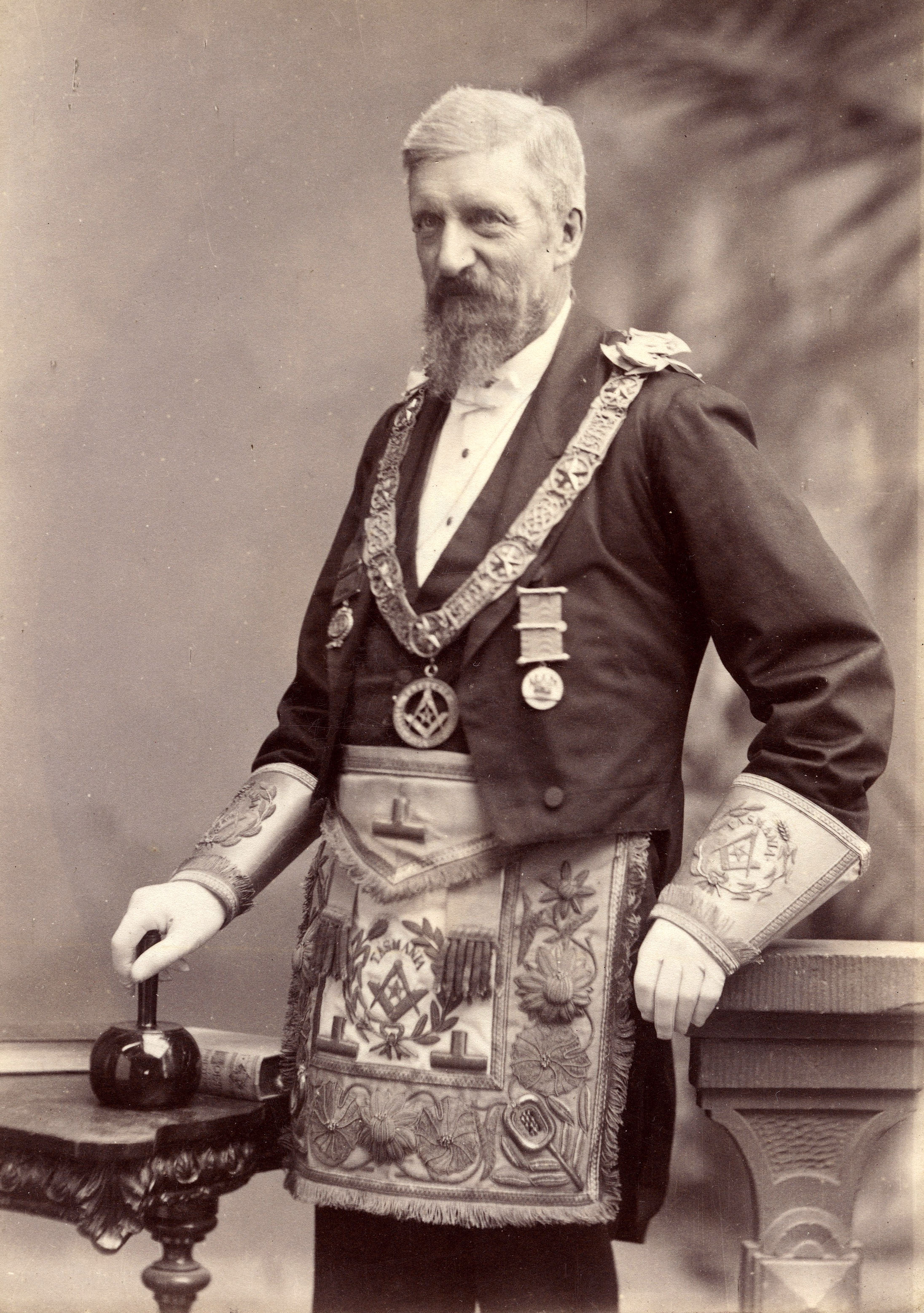
- Richard Deodatus Poulett-Harris in Masonic regalia
- Born: 26 October 1817; Cape Breton Island, Nova Scotia, Canada
- Died: 23 December 1899 (aged 82); Hobart, Australia
- Occupations: Educationalist, reverend
- Spouse(s): Catherine Prior Hall; Elizabeth Eleanor Milward

Richard Deodatus Poulett-Harris (26 October 1817 – 23 December 1899) was an educationalist in England and Tasmania.

== Early life and education ==
Harris was born on Cape Breton Island, Nova Scotia, Canada, the eldest son of Captain Charles Poulett Harris of the 60th Rifles Regiment, who was stationed there. His mother was Anna Maria, daughter of Richard Stout, judge and member of the governor's council on Cape Breton Island. Harris was educated from 1837 at the Manchester Free Grammar School and from 1839 Trinity College, Cambridge where he graduated B.A. with honours in 1843, and M.A. in 1852.

== Career ==
In 1844 he married Catherine Prior Hall, with whom he had six children, including Georgiana Poulett Harris (Mrs. Ingle, 1845–1919), first headmistress of Christchurch Girls' High School in New Zealand.

=== Tasmania ===
After his wife's death in June 1856, Harris went to Tasmania to become headmaster of the Hobart high school. In 1858 he married Elizabeth Eleanor Milward, with whom he had another six children. He was also the first Grand Master of the Masonic Lodge in Tasmania.

== Death and family ==
He died at Woodbridge, Tasmania, on 23 December 1899, and was survived by his wife, and of his first marriage: Georgiana; Katharine (1847–1940); Charlotte Maria (1850–1941); Annie Louisa (1853–1922), and Lovell Andrews (1856–1929); and of his second marriage: Eleanor Mary (1865–1931), Henry Vere (1866–1933), Anna May (1869–1953), and Louisa Violet (1873–1941). Louisa's younger twin, Harriet Lily, died from Tubercular Peritonitis in 1897, aged 23, having been a teacher at the Ladies' Grammar School and Kindergarten in Davey Street, Hobart that was run by her sisters. Richard and his daughters Eleanor and Lily are buried in the same grave at Cornelian Bay Cemetery.

== See also ==
- Henry Vere Poulett-Harris
- Lily Poulett-Harris
- Woodbridge, Tasmania
