= Woodbridge, Tasmania =

Town in Tasmania, Australia

Woodbridge
- Town
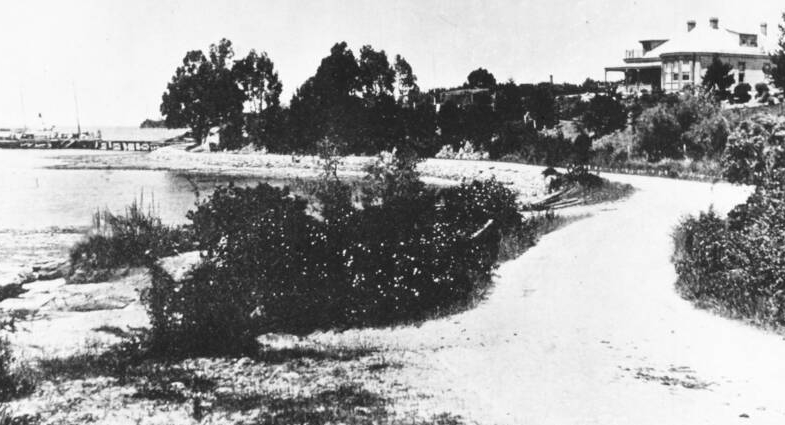
- The house at Peppermint Bay where Lily Poulett-Harris grew up. It was formerly a hotel but was purchased by her father and converted into a homestead in 1885.

- Coordinates: 43°10′S 147°14′E
- Country: Australia
- State: Tasmania
- Region: Hobart
- LGA: Kingborough
- Location: 36 km (22 mi) S of Hobart; 26 km (16 mi) S of Kingston; 4 km (2.5 mi) S of Kettering

Government
  - State electorate: Franklin
  - Federal division: Franklin

Population
  - Total: 547 (SAL 2021)
- Postcode: 7162
Localities around Woodbridge
Nicholls Rivulet	Kettering	Kettering
Nicholls Rivulet, Gardners Bay	Woodbridge	D’Entrecasteaux Channel
Gardners Bay	Birchs Bay	Birchs Bay

Woodbridge is a semi-rural locality in the local government area (LGA) of Kingborough in the Hobart LGA region of Tasmania. The locality is about 26 kilometres (16 mi) south of the town of Kingston. The 2021 Census recorded a population of 547 for the state suburb of Woodbridge, with the median age being 54. There are 180 families living in Woodbridge, with a mean of 1.8 children per household. It is located 38 kilometres (24 mi) south of the state capital, Hobart.

== History ==
Aboriginal Tasmanians have held a strong significance for and connection to the area for as many as 40,000 years.

Woodbridge was gazetted as a locality in 1967. Originally named Peppermint Bay, it is located on the D'Entrecasteaux Channel. First European settlement was in 1847. Peppermint Bay Post Office opened on 15 May 1854 and the town was renamed Woodbridge in 1881. At the 2006 census, Woodbridge had a population of 271.

== Geography ==
The shore of the D'Entrecasteaux Channel forms the eastern boundary.

== Road infrastructure ==
The Channel Highway (Route B68) passes through from north to south. Route C627 (Woodbridge Hill Road) starts at an intersection with B68 and runs west until it exits.

== Notable residents ==
- Richard Deodatus Poulett-Harris - educationalist
- Lily Poulett-Harris - founder of women's cricket in Australia
- Henry Vere Poulett-Harris - Tasmanian and Western Australian state-level cricketer
