= Tanganutara =

(1805–1858) palawa woman from Tasmania

Tanganutara or Tarenootairrer, also known as Tibb or Sarah (c. 1805 – 3 October 1858), was an Aboriginal Tasmanian woman.

She was kidnapped from her family at a young age and traded by sealers until, in 1830, she was removed from where she was living by George Augustus Robinson, the Chief Protector of Aborigines, to then take part in his 'Friendly Mission'. This mission ultimately led to the removal of the majority of the Aboriginal people, including Tanganutara, living on mainland Tasmania to be taken to Flinders Island. She ultimately settled at the Wybalenna Aboriginal Establishment, where her daughter Fanny Cochrane Smith was born.

Her name is said to mean 'to weep bitterly'.

== Biography ==
Little is known of Tanganutara's early life, but it is likely that she was a part of the Pinterrairer clan from Layrappenthe country at Mussel Roe. She experienced the violent effects of colonisation, and, as a young girl, in around 1815, she was kidnapped from her family by James Parish, a sealer working in the Bass Strait. This was a common practice at this time and the girls and women taken were often treated brutally, taken into sexual slavery, used as free labour and traded amongst the sealers; these women were known as 'Tyerelore' or 'Island Wives'.

Parish later sold Tanganutara, who had become known as Tibb, in around 1818 to another sealer, John Smith, for the price of four seal skins and was again sold in 1819 to George Robinson in an unknown trade. Robinson was in his 50s and he treated her harshly and frequently beat her with sticks. They lived together at King Island (Erobin) until 1825 and then at Woody Island until 1830 and at some point in this time together they had a son. While living together at Woody Island Robinson also had another Palawa woman living with him named Toogernuppertootenner (also recorded as Pueprittehe or Maria).

On 10 November 1830 George Augustus Robinson, the then Chief Protector of Aborigines, visited Robinson, Tanganutara and the other woman living with them and removed only the other woman; he left Tanganutara there so that she could assist Robinson who was, by this time, blind in one eye. Despite this she was soon after (on 11 December 1830) removed by James Parish, the man who had originally kidnapped her, who was then working as a coxswain for GA Robinson alongside several other women.

With GA Robison Tanganutara was able to return to the mainland and, from May to December 1831, she worked with him as a guide to help find other palawa people in what became known as the 'Friendly Mission' and, during this process, her knowledge of the land was invaluable to their success. One of the leaders they were able to locate was Multiyalakina (Eumarrah) the August who then joined them. During this period GA Robinson also recorded her usage of Tasmanian languages.

When the mission ended Tanganutara, alongside the other members of the party, walked in Hobart on 31 December 1831 as a part of a parade in front of the government of the day and the townspeople. Tanganutara remained in Hobart until 17 January 1832 before being sent to Flinders Island where GA Robinson and the government had decided that all 'remnants' of the Tasmanian Aboriginal population would be sent. She first lived at "The Lagoons", south of Whitemark, until in 1833 when the Wybalenna Aboriginal Establishment, a so-called 'Aboriginal settlement', was created and it was here that she was likely given the European name of 'Sarah'. When it opened it housed 134 Aboriginal people and its purposed was to 'civilise' and 'Christianise' the people sent there.

While at Wybalenna Tanganutara formed a relationship with Nikaminik (also recorded as Nicermenic) and she had at least four more children; one of these children was Fanny Cochrane Smith who was born in 1834 (Nikaminik's parentage of Cochrane Smith's is questioned). Fanny was taken from her family at the age of five and taken to live with the prison catechist, Robert Clark, and in 1842 she was sent to the Queen's Orphan School, in Hobart, where she was trained as a domestic servant and then returned to Clark. Tanganutara and Nikaminik protested both of these moves and made numerous complaints to Matthew Curling Friend who was conducting an inquiry into the treatment of the Aboriginal children living at the settlement.

When Wybalenna closed in 1847 only 47 people remained due to the high rate of death of the people living there. Tanganutara and Nikaminik both survived and were relocated to Oyster Cove where Nikaminik died in 1849. After Nikaminik's death Tanganutara was able to spend time with her children, including Fanny, and was able to pass on much of her traditional knowledge to them.

Tanganutara died on 3 October 1858 at Oyster Cove and was buried nearby at the stations cemetery. There it is considered highly likely that her skeleton was then removed by William Crowther who was accused of removing the remains of many Tasmanian Aboriginal people in 1908 while a medical student.
