= Dorothy Edna Genders =

Australian Anglican deaconess

- Title: Deaconess

Personal life
- Born: 27 July 1892 Launceston, Tasmania, Australia
- Died: 27 August 1978 (aged 86) Subiaco, Perth, Western Australia, Australia
- Spouse: Mabel Brownrigg

Religious life
- Religion: Anglican

Senior posting
- Period in office: 1919–1978

Dorothy Edna Genders (1892–1978) was an Australian charity worker and a deaconess in the Anglican Church of Australia. Known as "Sister Dorothy," she was notable for being one the first women to graduate with a Licenciate in Theology in Australia. She provided pastoral care, taught Sunday school, and trained candidates for the deaconess role. She also established and managed housing for vulnerable women. In East Perth, she turned the church rectory into a refuge for women survivors of domestic violence and prostitution. In Cottesloe, she opened a home for the destitute. She died in 1978, in Subiaco, a suburb of Perth.

== Early life and education ==
Genders was born on 27 July 1892 in Launceston, Tasmania, Australia. Her parents were William John Genders and Lilly Louisa Genders (née Westbrook). Her father was born in South Australia in 1864, and moved to Tasmania with his father, J.C. Genders. They settled in Launceston, and established a family saddlery business. The family were active members of the Anglican Church of Australia. William's sister, Marion Louisa Holmes, was a well-known activist for social reform and leader in the suffrage movement in Western Australia. Holmes was a founding member of the Western Australian National Council of Women.

William Genders and Lilly, his first wife, had two daughters, of whom Dorothy was the younger. Lilly Genders died the same year Dorothy was born. William Genders later married Mabel Brownrigg, the daughter of Canon Marcus Black Brownrigg, the Anglican minister at St. John's Church in Launceston. The couple did not have any children together.

== Career ==
In 1912, Genders went to visit her aunt, Marion Holmes, in Perth, Western Australia. While there, she decided she wanted to work in the Anglican church. From 1912 to 1917, she worked at the Mission House, affiliated with St. John's Church in Launceston. The Mission House provided housing for unemployed women, battered wives, and 'fallen women." Charlotte Jesse Shoebridge, the first deaconess in the Tasmanian diocese of the Anglican Church in Australia, directed the home.

In 1917, Genders moved to Sydney, to study at the Deaconess House, an Anglican training centre that had been founded in 1891 by Reverend Mervyn and Martha Archdale. She also took classes at the closely-affiliated Moore Theological College, as part of her training for the diaconate. The role of deaconess was an important one in the Anglican Church. It had been approved in 1889, as a path for women to be more involved in the life of the church. Deaconesses typically focused on charitable work with women and children. At the time of her studies, women were not permitted to be ordained to the priesthood in the Anglican Church.

Genders became a deaconess in 1919. She then completed a Licentiate in Theology (ThL) from the Australian College of Theology (ACT), graduating in 1925. The ThL degree was the basic theological training for men entering the ministry in the Anglican Church in Australia. The ACT had only allowed women to earn the ThL degree beginning in the 1920s; Genders was one of the first eight women to graduate with the degree.

In 1928, Genders moved permanently to Perth. She worked in Buckland Hill, training women who wanted to be deaconesses and assisting the rector at the local Anglican church. At her home in Mosman Park, she took in destitute women.

In 1931, she moved to South Perth. She was asked by Henry Le Fanu, the Archbishop of Perth, to provide pastoral care to members of the parish of St Bartholomew, which had no settled pastor. There, she taught Sunday School, and ran prayer meetings. She provided counselling, and made pastoral visits to people in hospitals and in jail, as well as homes. She offered support to families at the Children's Welfare Department and Children's Court. She was also active in the Girls' Friendly Society, an Anglican organisation originally founded in England to help domestic servants and working women. By 1910, there were branches in all Australian states.

As she had in Mosman Park, Genders opened her home in South Perth to women in need. She was living in the church's rectory, and she took in prostitutes, wives escaping abusive husbands, and women and children who had nowhere else to go. Local police brought women in distress to the rectory, knowing she would help them. In one year, she gave shelter to 240 people.

In the 1950s, Genders moved to Cottesloe, another suburb of Perth. Still active into her 60s, she ministered at St. Luke's Church. She bought the house next to where she lived, to provide housing for the poor.

On 13 June 1970, Genders was made a Member of the Order of the British Empire, for her service "to the underprivileged."

== Death and legacy ==
Genders retired to Meath House, an Anglican-run aged-care facility that opened in Trigg in 1972. Land for the home was donated by Phoebe Holmes, daughter of Marion Holmes, and Genders' cousin. Genders died on 27 August 1978, at the Home of Peace for the Chronic Sick in Subiaco.

The Genders Library in the Meath House was named after her.

Wollaston College is an Anglican theological school, located in Mount Claremont. There is a Genders' room named in her honour at the college.

The Dorothy Genders' Village, a retirement community in Mosman Park, is also named in her honour.

== See also ==
- Anglican Diocese of Perth
