= Laura Roper =

Australian sailor

Laura Roper is an Australian sailor. She competed in the 2011 Sydney to Hobart Yacht Race skippering Natelle Two. Her time in the race was 5 days 3 minutes and 12 seconds, coming in to Hobart at 1:03 p.m. on 31 December 2011. She competed with the same boat in the 2019 Sydney to Hobart Yacht Race as one of only nine female skippers.
