= Bourne House, East Woodhay =

House in Hampshire, England

Coordinates: 51.3675°N 1.3747°W

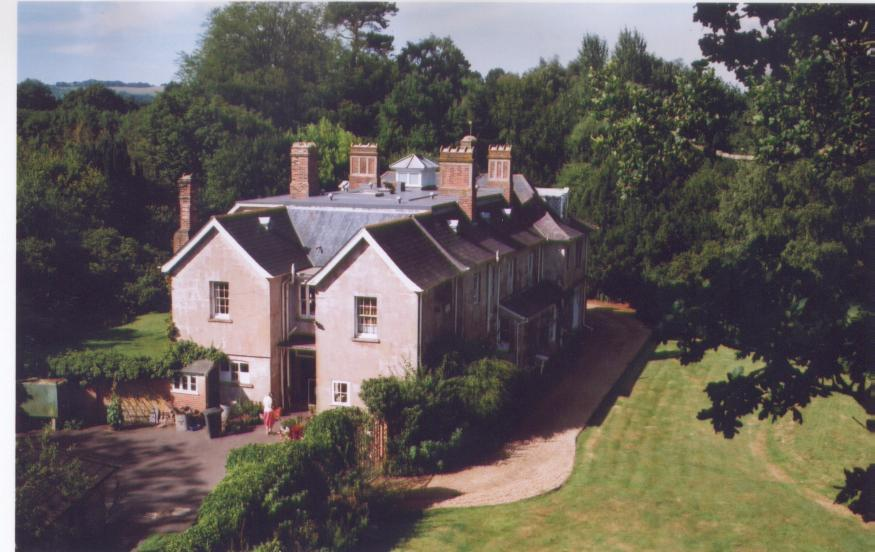
East end of Bourne House, 2005

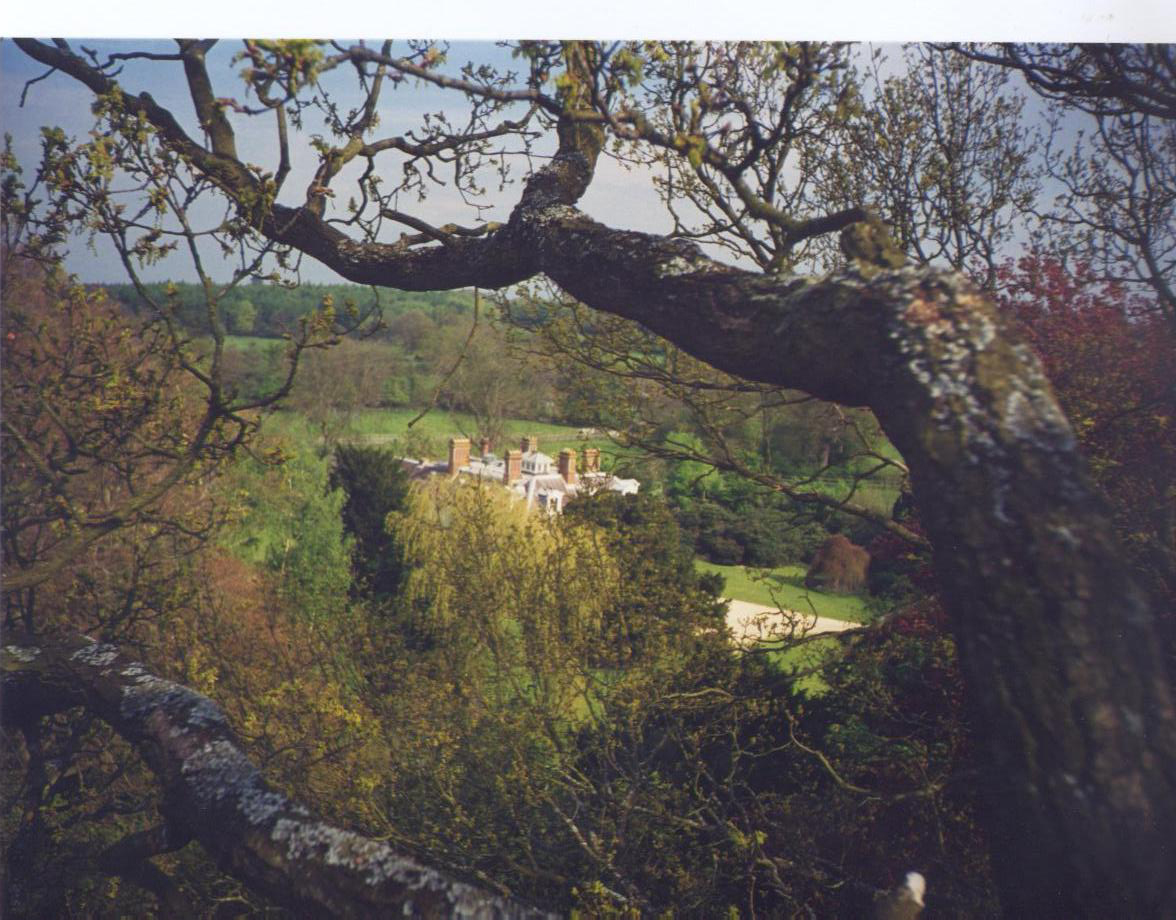
Bourne House, 1997

Bourne House, East Woodhay, lies at the northwestern tip of the parish of Widehaye in the Evingar hundred, in Hampshire, England.

== History ==
With an estate of 30 acres (120,000 m^{2}) that encompassed five cottages, it was nevertheless described as Bourne cottage when it was sold to divine and writer Philip Antoine de Teissier (1819–1891) in 1872. A notice advertising an impending sale by auction was printed in The Times of 1 March 1853, stating:

...a very valuable FREEHOLD ESTATE: comprising a compact gentleman’s residence, called BOURNE COTTAGE, with excellent yard, garden, barn, stable, and orchard. …bounded on the north by a beautiful stream*, . . . situate in a most desirable and highly respectable neighborhood, and together forms a very pretty estate. . . . The scenery around is very extensive and picturesque.

== Owners ==
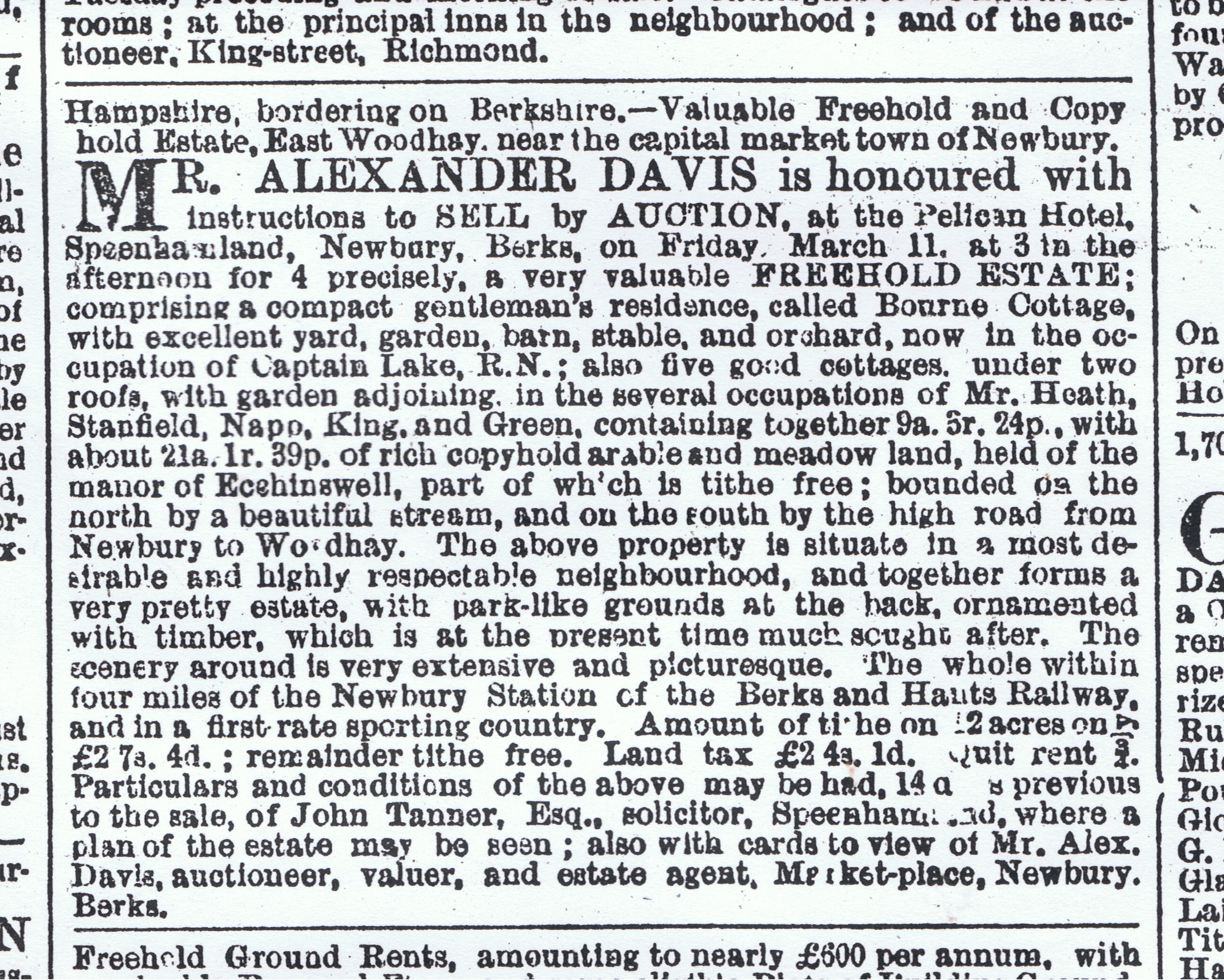
Advert for the sale of Bourne Cottage/House, in The Times, London, Tuesday, March 1, 1853

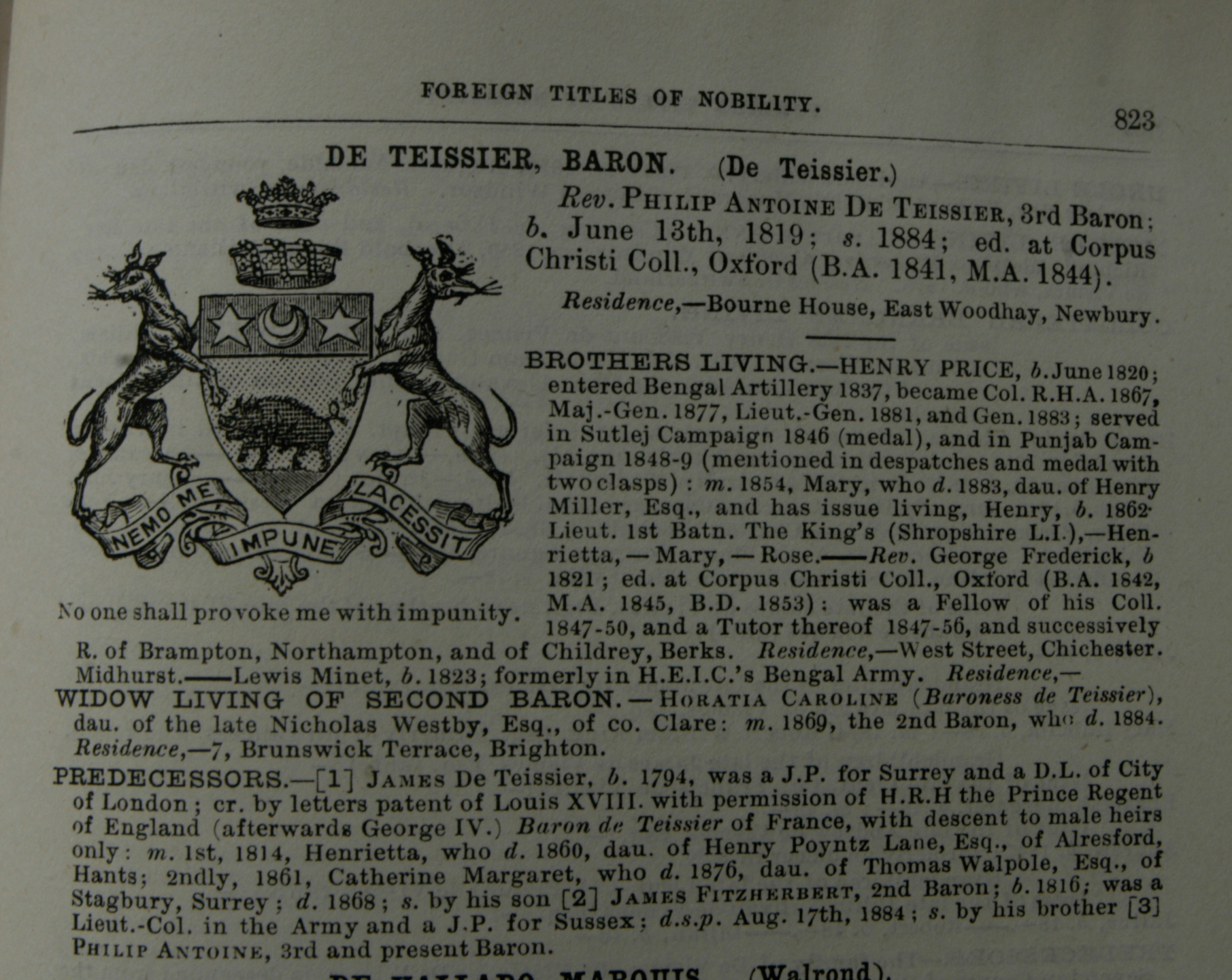
De Teissier from 1888 Debrett's Peerage

=== The Barons de Teissier ===
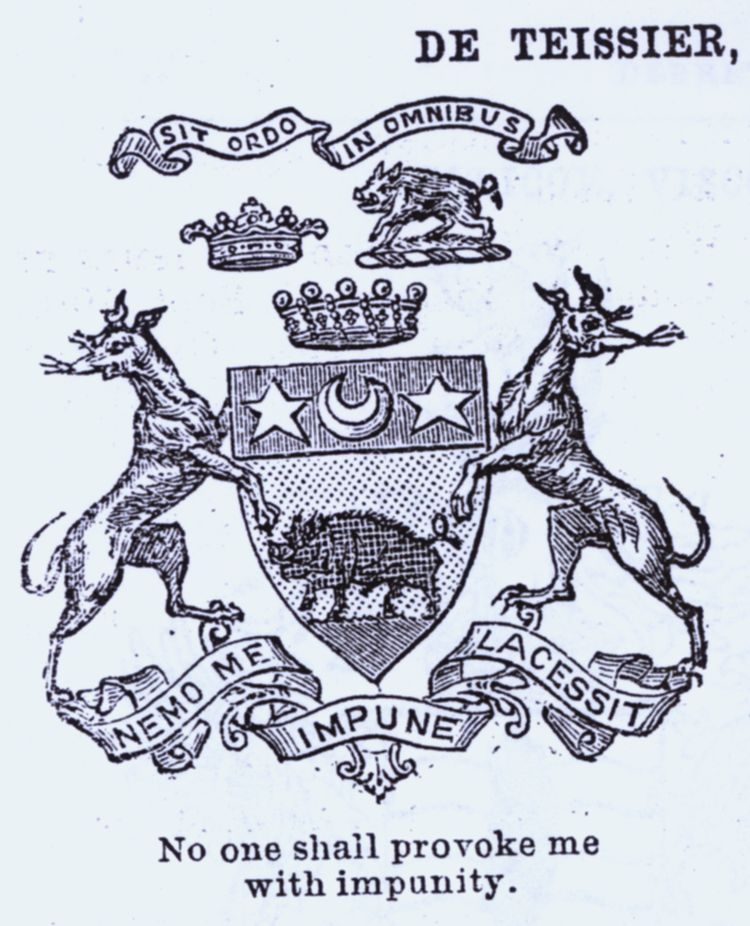

The Rev. Philip Antoine de Teissier was the third son of James (first Baron) de Teissier (1794–1868), of Woodcote Park, Epsom, Surrey, who was appointed a Baron of France by Louis XVIII on 4 December 1819 '‘in consideration for the kindness shown by his father [Lewis, a merchant of London] during the French Revolution to French subjects, and in acknowledgement of the loyalty of the head of the family Jean Antoine (de Teissier) 3rd Baron of Marquerittas who was guillotined 20 May 1794'’.

The De Teissiers owned the house from 1872 to 1910.

After Corpus Christi College, Oxford (matric. 1837), Philip de Teissier held around a dozen curacies between 1842 and 1871. He wrote five books. including Voices of the Dead (London, 1875) and Sermons upon the Lord’s Supper (London, 1878). In 1891 Philip de Teissier, (by then third Baron de Teissier) died unmarried and childless at the Westminster Palace Hotel, London, leaving effects valued at £57,170. The house passed to his brother, General (Henry) Price (fourth Baron) de Teissier (1820–1895), described as "of Fetcham-grove, Leatherhead", and then of both of "Fetcham-grove and Bourne-house". General Baron de Teissier owned the house for four years before he died and it was passed to his son, Henry (fifth) Baron de Teissier (1862-25 June 1931), who sold Bourne House in 1910. He died at age 30 at The Avenue, Upper Norwood, Surrey, leaving effects valued at £1,535 15s 3d to his wife, Agneta Mary, Baroness de Teissier.

=== Sir Ernest Salter Wills ===
Sir Ernest Wills (1869–1958), 3rd Baronet of Hazelwood, Laird of Meggernie Castle, HM's Lord Lieutenant for the County of Wiltshire (1930–42) of the Bristol tobacco firm W. D. & H. O. Wills, owned the house for three and a half years, 1920–1923, after the First World War just before and after he inherited his baronetcy and another house on the death of his brother in October 1921. His elder son, Ernest Edward de Winton-Wills; later, Lt. Col. Sir Ernest Edward de Winton-Wills, 4th Baronet of Hazelwood, Laird of Meggernie Castle, spent his late childhood, there, while an Eton schoolboy. Up to 1920, he had lived at Ramsbury Manor, Wiltshire. Sir Ernest died in 1958, assets valued at £766,556. In 1920 he already had Meggernie Castle, Glenlyon, Perthshire, Scotland, and went on to possess the 8,000-acre (32 km^{2}) Littlecote estate near Hungerford (leased from 1922, freehold from 1929). A director of Imperial Tobacco, he was the last of his family to be directly involved in the business.

== Last known birth in the house ==
On 19 November 1921 Margaret Joyce de Winton Wills (1898–1976), daughter of Ernest Wills, wife of Captain John Trevor Kyffin (1894–1969), gave birth at Bourne House to a daughter, named Susan.

Susan, aka Victoria Gordon of 88 Ebury Street, Belgravia, appears, as Gwen or Brenda, in Sir John "Kyffin" Williams' memoir A Wider Sky, 1991, and married three times:

- (1) (Kingswear, Devon, 15.12.1943) Lt. Creighton 'Topline' Cecil Percy Broadhurst, RNVR. (9.10.1919–), the Westward Television gardening correspondent, renowned Torquay rose garden owner and author of Sound Gardening, Plymouth Sound, 1980, they divorced circa 1950 having had three children;
- (2) (St Columba's, Cadogan Sq, London, 4.4.1952) Michael Arthur Baillie-Grohmam, (d.1978), DSC, of Schloss Matzen (sold 1957), Brizlegg, Austria, a grandson of William Adolf Baillie Grohman, divorce 1958; and
- (3) (Crowborough, 19.4.1962) the legendary cricketer Percy Fender (1892–1985), from whom she had separated at the time of her early death on 25.11.1966, aged 45.

== John William Douglas ==
John William Douglas had the house for five years from 1923 to 1928.

== Arthur Southwell ==
Irish Peer, Sir Arthur Southwell, seventh baronet, the fifth Viscount Southwell (1872–1944), and his family had it for 17 years from 1929 to 1946. Southwell was in the Royal Monmouthshire Engineers Militia and the Shropshire Yeomanry and was a lieutenant-colonel in the Machine Gun Corps. During World War II Southwell led the local Air Raid Precautions unit, the dining-room at Bourne House therefore being used as the control room. He married Dorothy Walrond in 1897. She was the daughter of the first Lord Waleran. Dorothy, who died in 1952, created a Japanese garden, some plants and the rockery, which were extant when the house went on sale in 2006.

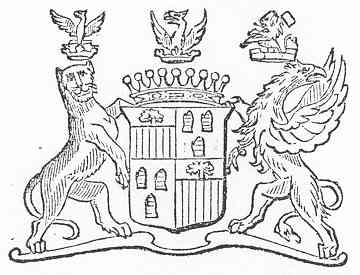
The arms of Fane De Salis, owners & residents, 1946–2006

The 1946 sale particulars described the house as a :

...Particularly Attractive Country Residence... Lounge hall, three reception rooms, Ten bedrooms, Four Bathrooms, Domestic Offices,... Main Electric Light, Telephone... The Residence is of moderate size, fitted with modern conveniences and easily run ... Two loose Boxes, Harness Room with loft over, Cowhouse for two Cows, Four dog kennels, Men’s E.C., Potting Shed, Apple Store, four cottages, 31 acres, good water supply (main available) ... Excellent Sporting and Residential neighbourhood
