= Randalls Bay, Tasmania =

Randalls Bay Tasmania
- Coordinates: 43°14′12″S 147°07′47″E
- Population: 47 (2016 census)
- Postcode(s): 7112
- Location: 30 km (19 mi) SE of Huonville
- LGA(s): Huon Valley
- Region: South-east
- State electorate(s): Franklin
- Federal division(s): Franklin
Localities around Randalls Bay:
Abels Bay	Garden Island Creek	Garden Island Creek
Abels Bay	Randalls Bay	Garden Island Creek
Eggs and Bacon Bay	Garden Island Bay	Garden Island Bay

Randalls Bay is a rural locality in the local government area (LGA) of Huon Valley in the South-east LGA region of Tasmania. The locality is about 30 kilometres (19 mi) south-east of the town of Huonville. The 2016 census recorded a population of 47 for the state suburb of Randalls Bay.

== History ==
Randalls Bay is a confirmed locality.

== Geography ==
The waters of Garden Island Bay form the southern boundary.

== Road infrastructure ==
Route B68 (Channel Highway) passes through the northern tip of the locality.
