= Nicholls Rivulet, Tasmania =

Nicholls Rivulet Tasmania
- Coordinates: 43°08′51″S 147°09′17″E
- Population: 311 (2016 census)
- Postcode(s): 7112
- Location: 26 km (16 mi) SE of Huonville
- LGA(s): Huon Valley
- Region: South-east
- State electorate(s): Franklin
- Federal division(s): Franklin
Localities around Nicholls Rivulet:
Cygnet	Cygnet, Pelverata	Pelverata
Port Cygnet (Bay), Cygnet	Nicholls Rivulet	Oyster Cove, Woodbridge
Port Cygnet	Gardners Bay	Woodbridge

Nicholls Rivulet is a rural locality in the local government area (LGA) of Huon Valley in the South-east LGA region of Tasmania. The locality is about 26 kilometres (16 mi) south-east of the town of Huonville. The 2016 census recorded a population of 311 for the state suburb of Nicholls Rivulet.

== History ==
Nicholls Rivulet was gazetted as a locality in 1956. It is believed to be named for William Nichols, the first European to settle in the Port Cygnet area, circa 1835.

== Geography ==
The waters of Port Cygnet form the southern part of the western boundary. Nicholls Rivulet (the watercourse) flows through the locality from north to south-west.

== Road infrastructure ==
Route B68 (Channel Highway) runs through from north-west to south-west. From there, Route C626 (Nicholls Rivulet Road) provides access to the rest of the locality.
