= Calder, Tasmania =

Calder Tasmania
- Coordinates: 41°04′43″S 145°37′25″E
- Population: 212 (2016 census)
- Postcode(s): 7325
- Location: 18 km (11 mi) SW of Wynyard
- LGA(s): Waratah-Wynyard
- Region: North West
- State electorate(s): Braddon
- Federal division(s): Braddon
Localities around Calder:
Moorleah	Flowerdale	Wynyard
Preolenna, Moorleah	Calder	Oldina, Yolla
Takone	Takone	Henrietta

Calder is a rural locality in the local government area of Waratah-Wynyard in the North West region of Tasmania. It is located about 18 kilometres (11 mi) south-west of the town of Wynyard. The 2016 census determined a population of 212 for the state suburb of Calder.

== History ==
The locality was named for James Erskine Calder, the Surveyor General of Tasmania between 1859 and 1870. It was gazetted as a locality in 1966.

== Geography ==
The Inglis River forms most of the western boundary. The Calder River enters the locality in the south-east and flows north-west until it meets the Inglis River.

== Road infrastructure ==
The C235 route (Calder Road) enters from the north-east and runs south to the centre before exiting to the east as Kellatier Road.
