= Sisters Creek, Tasmania =

Sisters Creek
- Town
- Coordinates: 40°57′37″S 145°33′44″E
- Country: Australia
- State: Tasmania
- Region: North-west and west
- LGA: Waratah-Wynyard, Circular Head
- Location: 18 km (11 mi) NW of Wynyard

Government
  - State electorate: Braddon
  - Federal division: Braddon

Population
  - Total: 134 (2016 census)
- Postcode: 7320
Localities around Sisters Creek
Rocky Cape National Park	Sisters Beach	Boat Harbour Beach
Montumana	Sisters Creek	Boat Harbour
Milabena	Myalla	Moorleah

Sisters Creek is a locality and small rural community in the local government areas of Waratah-Wynyard and Circular Head, in the North-west and west region of Tasmania. It is located about 18 kilometres (11 mi) north-west of the town of Wynyard. The Bass Highway passes through from east to west, and the watercourse named Sisters Creek flows through from south to north. The 2016 census determined a population of 134 for the state suburb of Sisters Creek.

== History ==
An 1851 map of Tasmania names a range of hills in the vicinity as the "Sisters". The name seems to have been applied to the nearby creek. The hills were subsequently officially named "Two Sisters".

== Road infrastructure ==
The C229 route (Myalla Road) terminates at the Bass Highway in Sisters Creek. It runs south to Myalla, and from there leads, via route C236 (Pruana Road), to the Murchison Highway.
