= Moorleah, Tasmania =

Moorleah Tasmania
- Coordinates: 41°01′17″S 145°36′35″E
- Population: 148 (2016 census)
- Postcode(s): 7325
- Location: 14 km (9 mi) SW of Wynyard
- LGA(s): Waratah-Wynyard
- Region: North West
- State electorate(s): Braddon
- Federal division(s): Braddon
Localities around Moorleah:
| Sisters Creek | Flowerdale | Flowerdale |
| Lapoinya | Moorleah | Calder |
| Lapoinya | Preolenna | Calder |

Moorleah is a rural locality in the local government area of Waratah-Wynyard in the North West region of Tasmania. It is located about 14 kilometres (8.7 mi) south-west of the town of Wynyard. The 2016 census determined a population of 148 for the state suburb of Moorleah.

== History ==
The locality was originally known as Upper Flowerdale. It was gazetted in 1966.

== Geography ==
The Flowerdale River forms the western boundary, and the Inglis River forms much of the eastern boundary.

== Road infrastructure ==
The C229 route (Preolenna Road) enters from the north-east and runs through to the south before exiting. Route C230 (Lapoinya Road) starts at an intersection with Route C229 and runs west before exiting.
