= Coast FM =

Coast FM may refer to:

- 97.3 Coast FM, a commercial radio station serving Perth, Mandurah & Bunbury, Western Australia
- Heart North Wales Coast, commercial radio station in North Wales
- Coast FM (Adelaide), a community radio station in Glandore, South Australia
- Coast FM Tasmania, community radio station in Tasmania, Australia
- Coast FM (Tenerife), radio station in Tenerife, Canary Islands
- Coast FM 95.3, Australian radio station in Warrnambool, servicing the Great South Coast region of Victoria
- Coast FM (West Cornwall), community radio station in Cornwall, UK
- Coast FM (Westport), community radio station in Westport, New Zealand
- East Coast FM, Irish local radio station broadcasting from Bray
- 91.7 ABC Coast FM, ABC Local Radio station in Australia
- 90.3 ABC Coast FM, ABC Local Radio station based in Maroochydore
- WSNE-FM (93.3 FM, "Coast 93-3"), southern New England Hot Adult Contemporary music formatted radio station
- WRWN (107.9 "The Coast"), a soft adult contemporary radio station owned by Triad Broadcasting at Port Royal, South Carolina
- WGCM-FM (102.3 FM, "Coast 102.3 FM"), classic hits formatted radio station based in Gulfport–Biloxi, Mississippi
- WNCV (93.3 FM, "Coast 93.3"), radio station licensed to serve Evergreen, Alabama
- KOZT (95.3 FM "The Coast"), radio station broadcasting Album Oriented Rock format, licensed to Ft. Bragg, California
- WMNX (97.3 FM "Coast 97.3"), Mainstream Urban radio station licensed to Wilmington, North Carolina

== See also ==
- KOST (103.5 FM), radio station in Los Angeles, California
