= Flowerdale, Tasmania =

Flowerdale Tasmania
- Coordinates: 40°58′12″S 145°39′50″E
- Population: 324 (2011)
- Postcode(s): 7325
- Elevation: 24 m (79 ft)
- Location: 6 km (4 mi) NW of Wynyard, Tasmania
- LGA(s): Waratah-Wynyard
- Region: North West Tasmania
- State electorate(s): Braddon
- Federal division(s): Braddon
Localities around Flowerdale:
Boat Harbour	Table Cape	Table Cape
Boat Harbour	Flowerdale	Wynyard
Moorleah	Calder	Wynyard

Flowerdale is a locality and small rural community of Waratah-Wynyard, in north-west Tasmania. Significant geographic features include the Inglis River and the confluence of its largest tributary, the Flowerdale River. The 2011 census determined a population of 324 for the state suburb of Flowerdale, which includes Flowerdale and the nearby Table Cape locality.

== History ==
Flowerdale Post Office opened on 1 March 1891 and closed in 1981.

The Preolenna line was a railway line which extended from the Flowerdale junction, to as far as Maweena, a small distance past Preolenna. It was first opened in 1917 but was soon closed in 1931 - in one of its annual reports, the TGR operators had described the traffic along the route as "infintecimal".
