= Surveyor general =

Official responsible for government surveying

A surveyor general is an official responsible for government surveying in a specific country or territory. Historically, the post of a surveyor general would often have been a military appointment, but it is now more likely to be a civil service post.

The following surveyor general positions exist, or have existed historically:

- Surveyors general in Australia:
  - Surveyor General of New South Wales
  - Surveyor General of South Australia
  - Surveyor General of Queensland
  - Surveyor General of Tasmania
  - Surveyor General of the Northern Territory
  - Surveyor General of Victoria
  - Surveyor General of Western Australia
- Surveyors general in Canada:
  - Surveyor General of Canada
  - Arpenteur général du Québec – prior to 1840s as Surveyor General of Lower Canada
  - Surveyor General of Upper Canada – 1791 to 1829 as Surveyor General of Upper Canada and the Commissioner of Crown Lands (Province of Canada) 1827 to 1867 – now under Ministry of Natural Resources (Ontario) as the Office of the Surveyor General
  - Surveyor General of Nova Scotia
- Surveyors general in British North America
  - Surveyor General of the Colony of Vancouver Island
    - Joseph Despard Pemberton
  - Surveyor General of New Brunswick
    - Robert Power (surveyor)
- Surveyor General of Cornwall, UK
- Surveyor General of Hong Kong
- Surveyor General of India
- Surveyor General of Ireland
- Surveyor General of Malaysia
- Surveyor General of New Netherland
- Surveyor-General of New Zealand
- Surveyor General of Pakistan
- Surveyor General of Sri Lanka (formerly Surveyor General of Ceylon)
- Surveyors general in the United States and its colonial predecessors:
  - Surveyor General of the United States
  - Surveyor General of Arizona
  - Surveyor General of North Carolina
    - Surveyor General of the Province of North Carolina
  - Surveyor General of the Northwest Territory (today's north-central U.S.)
  - Surveyor General of the Eastern District
  - Surveyor General of Spanish Louisiana

== See also ==
- Surveyor Generals Corner (Australia)
- Public Land Survey System (United States)
