= Lapoinya =

Lapoinya Tasmania
- Coordinates: 41°02′S 145°34′E
- Population: 143 (SAL 2021)
- Postcode(s): 7325
- LGA(s): Waratah-Wynyard Council
- State electorate(s): Braddon
- Federal division(s): Braddon
Localities around Lapoinya:
Myalla	Sisters Creek	Moorleah
Milabena	Lapoinya	Moorleah
Meunna	Preolenna	Preolenna

Lapoinya (pronounced La-poin-ya) is a small agricultural centre on the north-west coast of Tasmania west of Wynyard. The name is Tasmanian Aboriginal word for "fern tree", a plant that abounds in those surviving untouched parts of the original temperate rainforest. At the 2006 census, Lapoinya had a population of 368.

== History ==
First developed commercially around 1900, the town has been a centre for forestry, mixed agriculture (especially potato-growing), and grazing (mostly dairy cattle).

Lapoinya Post Office opened on 1 November 1912, and closed in 1970.

In November 2014, it was announced the town was fighting Forestry Tasmania to attempt to stop the company logging the towns surrounding forest. In January 2016, Bob Brown and three others were arrested during an anti-logging protest on a 49-hectare Forestry Tasmania coupe at Lopoinya.
