= Takone, Tasmania =

Takone Tasmania
- Coordinates: 41°10′59″S 145°37′59″E
- Population: 81 (2016 census)
- Postcode(s): 7325
- Location: 28 km (17 mi) SW of Wynyard
- LGA(s): Waratah-Wynyard
- Region: North West
- State electorate(s): Braddon
- Federal division(s): Braddon
Localities around Takone:
Preolenna	Calder	Yolla
West Takone	Takone	Henrietta
West Takone	Oonah	Oonah

Takone is a rural locality in the local government area of Waratah-Wynyard in the North West region of Tasmania. It is located about 28 kilometres (17 mi) south-west of the town of Wynyard. The 2016 census determined a population of 81 for the state suburb of Takone.

== History ==
The locality name is believed to be an Aboriginal word meaning "sigh". It was gazetted in 1966.

== Geography ==
The Inglis River flows through from south-east to north-east, and then forms part of the northern boundary. The Jessie River forms the north-western boundary as it flows toward its junction with the Inglis.

== Road infrastructure ==
The C236 route (Takone Road) enters from the north-east and runs through to the south-west before exiting. Route C237 (Oldina Road) starts at an intersection with Route C236 and runs north before exiting.
