= Wynyard Cricket Club =

- Founded: 1952
- Home ground: Wynyard Showgrounds
- Colours: Royal Blue/Light Blue/White
- President: Clayton Hawkins
- Head coach: Gregg Sharman, Cherie Hawkins
- Captain: Matthew Kinch, Cherie Hawkins
- NWTCA/CNW Titles: 4 and 4
- 2018–19: 6th and 3rd

Wynyard Cricket Club (WCC) is a cricket team which represents the town of Wynyard in the North West Tasmanian Cricket Association (now Cricket North West) grade cricket competition.

An article from the Emu Bay Times and North West and West Coast Advocate dated September 19, 1898, references a Wynyard Cricket Club holding its annual meeting, suggesting that cricket activities were present in the area as early as the late 19th century.

The side was admitted to the NWTCA competition for the 1952/53 season and originally played on a concrete wicket.

By 1954 they had laid a turf pitch, and in the 1957/58 season they narrowly missed out on their first title by losing to Sheffield in the Grand Final by 29 runs on first innings, and running out of time in run chase for outright victory. The club remained competitive for the next decade, and played a remarkable grand final tie led by captain John Coughlan against Burnie/Yeoman Cricket Club in the 1965/66 season, both sides being all out for 122. However Wynyard were awarded the title on the basis of having finished higher in the league, and so won their first NWTCA premiership.

In the 1974/75 season new clubrooms were constructed at the Showground with an incredible amount of voluntary work contributed, and it proved the start of another successful season, with the club wrapping up their second premiership that season under the captaincy of Maurice Hodgetts.

The club struggled for success in the 1980s, but managed to finally win a third title in the 1990/91 season under the guidance of Shane Walker. The last first grade men's club premiership was in 2004/05 led by Brendon Keeling after making grand finals in 2002/03 and 2003/04. The club has had a strong showing in 50 over cricket, winning Advocate Cup/Greater Northern titles in 1990/91, 2000/01, 2001/02, 2013/14.

Wynyard Cricket Club's senior female team, the "Bluebelles", won a record four premierships in a row in the Cricket North West competition from season 2013-15 through to 2016-17. The first premiership was captained by former Tasmanian representative allrounder Cherie Hawkins. The following three flags were led by Kahla Summers. The Bluebelles lost the 2017/18 grand final which would have made five straight premierships.

Wynyard Cricket Club has produced some outstanding players, and many state representatives, including Jamie Cox, Dene Hills, Shaun Young, Phillip Blizzard, John Coughlan, Peter Mancell, Les "Snowy" Allen, Gregg Sharman, and Cherie Hawkins.

== Honours ==
1st Grade NWTCA/CNW Premierships: (4) 1965/66, 1974/75, 1990/91, 2004/05

Greater Northern Cup (Men): (2) 2001/02, 2013/14

Advocate Cup 50 Over Titles (Men): (3) 1990/91, 2000/01, 2001/02

Senior Female: (4) 2013/14, 2014/15, 2015/16, 2016/17

Second Grade Men: (5) 1977/78, 1980/81, 1983/84, 1995/96, 2005/06

Second Grade T20 Men's: (1) 2013/14

Third Grade Men's: (3) 1995/96, 2002/03, 2003/04

Under 17 Boys: (1) 2007/08

Under 15 Boys: (2) 2011/12, 2017/18

NWTCA/CNW Hall of Fame inductees: Tom Rocher (1997), Barry Stewart (1997), Les Allen (2002), Phil Blizzard (2011), Shane Walker (2012).P J Mir former Pakistan cricketer also represented Wynyard in 1979, later teamed up with Phillip Blizzard to play in the Bolton League in the UK, he also won player of the year award for Wynyard in the NWTCA
