= Boat Harbour, Tasmania =

Boat Harbour
- Town
- Coordinates: 40°56′46″S 145°38′14″E
- Country: Australia
- State: Tasmania
- Region: North-west and west
- LGA: Waratah–Wynyard
- Location: 11 km (6.8 mi) NW of Wynyard

Government
  - State electorate: Braddon
  - Federal division: Braddon

Population
  - Total: 273 (2016 census)
- Postcode: 7321
Localities around Boat Harbour
Sisters Beach	Bass Strait, Boat Harbour Beach	Bass Strait
Sisters Beach, Sisters Creek	Boat Harbour	Table Cape
Sisters Creek	Flowerdale	Flowerdale

Boat Harbour is a rural locality in the local government area (LGA) of Waratah–Wynyard in the North-west and west LGA region of Tasmania. The locality is about 11 kilometres (6.8 mi) north-west of the town of Wynyard. The 2021 census recorded a population of 339 for the state suburb of Boat Harbour.

== History ==
Boat Harbour was gazetted as a locality in 1966.

== Geography ==
The waters of Bass Strait form most of the northern boundary, the exception being the locality of Boat Harbour Beach. The Flowerdale River forms much of the southern boundary.

== Road infrastructure ==
The Bass Highway (Route A2) passes through from east to south-west. Route C231 (Gates Road) starts at an intersection with A2 and runs south until it exits. Route C232 (Port Road) starts at an intersection with A2 and runs north to the locality of Boat Harbour Beach. Route C233 (Sisters Beach Road) starts at an intersection with C232 and runs west until it exits.
