= Oonah =

- Coordinates: 41°13′27″S 145°37′07″E
- Country: Australia
- State: Tasmania
- Region: North West
- LGA: Burnie, Waratah-Wynyard
- Location: 38 km (24 mi) SW of Burnie

Government
  - State electorate: Braddon
  - Federal division: Braddon

Population
  - Total: nil (2016 census)
- Postcode: 7325
Localities around Oonah
Takone	Henrietta	Tewkesbury
West Takone	Oonah	Tewkesbury
Parrawe	Parrawe	Hampshire

Oonah is a rural locality in the local government areas of Burnie and Waratah-Wynyard in the North West region of Tasmania. It is located about 38 kilometres (24 mi) south-west of the town of Burnie. The 2016 census determined a population of nil for the state suburb of Oonah.

== History ==
The name is believed to be an Aboriginal word meaning "platypus". The Oonah tin mining company operated in the area from 1890, and the name was used for the parish in 1891. It was used for a post station and town from 1909. The locality was gazetted in 1966.

== Geography ==
The Hellyer River forms the south-western boundary and part of the southern, with Hellyer Gorge at the southern extremity of the locality on that section of the river.

== Road infrastructure ==
The A10 route (Murchison Highway) enters from the north-east and runs south-west before exiting to the south. Route C101 (Oonah Road) starts at an intersection with route A10 and runs south-east before exiting.
