= West Takone =

- Town
- Coordinates: 41°10′05″S 145°33′57″E
- Country: Australia
- State: Tasmania
- Region: North West
- LGA: Waratah-Wynyard, Circular Head
- Location: 38 km (24 mi) SW of Wynyard

Government
  - State electorate: Braddon
  - Federal division: Braddon

Population
  - Total: 8 (2016 census)
- Postcode: 7325
Localities around West Takone
Mawbanna	Preolenna, Meunna	Takone
West Coast	West Takone	Takone
West Coast	Parrawe	Oonah

West Takone is a rural locality in the local government areas of Waratah-Wynyard and Circular Head in the North West region of Tasmania. It is located about 38 kilometres (24 mi) south-west of the town of Wynyard. The 2016 census determined a population of 8 for the state suburb of West Takone.

== History ==
The locality was originally gazetted as Takone West. It was re-gazetted as West Takone in 1974.

== Geography ==
The Arthur River forms most of the western boundary, and the Hellyer River forms the south-western boundary as it flows to its junction with the Arthur.

== Road infrastructure ==
The C236 route (Takone Road) enters from the east and runs through to the north-west before exiting.
