= Marguerite Helen Power =

Australian poet (1870–1957)

- Born: 6 January 1870; Mount Joy, Campbell Town, Tasmania, Australia
- Died: 27 November 1957 (aged 87); South Hobart, Tasmania, Australia
- Occupation: Poet
- Relatives: Robert Power (grandfather); Marguerite Gardiner, Countess of Blessington (great aunt)

Marguerite Helen Power (6 January 1870 – 27 November 1957) was an Australian poet.

== Biography ==
Power was born on 6 January 1870 at Mount Joy (now known as Balvaird), on the outskirts of Campbell Town, Tasmania, Australia. She was named for her great aunt, Marguerite Gardiner, Countess of Blessington. Her parents were Thomas Power, council clerk of Campbell Town, and Anstie Munro (née Hull). On her paternal side, she was the granddaughter of the British Army officer Surveyor General of Tasmania, Robert Power, who was born in Ireland.

Power grew up in Campbell Town, receiving little formal education, but learned to read in her fathers library and studied the French and Italian languages as a teenager. Power moved to the Tasmanian capital Hobart in 1902, where she ran a guest-house with her sister.

Between 1909 and 1932, Power contributed poems to the Bulletin, Lone Hand and Australasian. Her poems dwelled on themes including "death, love, growing old, the loss of friends and the persistence of the past in the present." Power's work was included in The Australian Poetry Annual (1920) and Louis Lavater's The Sonnet in Australasia (1926). Her works were also collected into two anthologies, Poems (1934) and A Lute with Three Strings (1964), both with introductions written by Clive Samson. Power also held adult literacy classes and later joined a poetry reading group in Hobart.

Power died on 27 November 1957 in South Hobart, Tasmania, Australia. Her archives are held in the Clive Samson Collection at the University of Tasmania.
