= Tewkesbury, Tasmania =

Tewkesbury
- Town
- Coordinates: 41°12′03″S 145°45′00″E
- Country: Australia
- State: Tasmania
- Region: North West
- LGA: Burnie
- Location: 26 km (16 mi) SW of Burnie

Government
  - State electorate: Braddon
  - Federal division: Braddon
- Elevation: 410 m (1,350 ft)

Population
  - Total: 76 (2016 census)
- Postcode: 7321
- Mean max temp: 13.5 °C (56.3 °F)
- Mean min temp: 5.8 °C (42.4 °F)
- Annual rainfall: 1,541.1 mm (60.67 in)
Localities around Tewkesbury
Henrietta	West Ridgley	Ridgley
Oonah	Tewkesbury	Highclere
Parrawe	Hampshire	Hampshire

Tewkesbury is a locality and small rural community in the local government area of Burnie in the North West region of Tasmania. It is located about 26 kilometres (16 mi) south-west of the town of Burnie. The 2016 census determined a population of 76 for the state suburb of Tewkesbury.

== History ==
The locality was gazetted in 1966.

== Geography ==
The Guide River forms part of the eastern boundary, and the Cam River forms the north-western boundary. The Melba rail line follows the south-eastern boundary.

=== Climate ===
Tewkesbury possesses an altitude-influenced oceanic climate (Köppen: Cfb) with mild summers and chilly, very wet winters. The town is quite cloudy, experiencing an average of 5.6 sunshine hours daily per annum. Extreme temperatures have ranged from 32.8 °C (91.0 °F) on 2 March 1988 to −5.0 °C (23.0 °F) on 12 July 1970.

Climate data for Tewkesbury (41.23°S 145.71°E, 410 m (1,350 ft) AMSL) (1934-1995)
Month	Jan	Feb	Mar	Apr	May	Jun	Jul	Aug	Sep	Oct	Nov	Dec	Year
Record high °C (°F)	32.6 (90.7)	32.3 (90.1)	32.8 (91.0)	24.7 (76.5)	20.1 (68.2)	14.9 (58.8)	18.4 (65.1)	18.1 (64.6)	22.5 (72.5)	25.9 (78.6)	27.6 (81.7)	30.5 (86.9)	32.8 (91.0)
Mean daily maximum °C (°F)	18.6 (65.5)	18.9 (66.0)	17.2 (63.0)	14.0 (57.2)	11.4 (52.5)	9.2 (48.6)	8.6 (47.5)	9.3 (48.7)	10.9 (51.6)	13.0 (55.4)	14.7 (58.5)	16.7 (62.1)	13.5 (56.4)
Mean daily minimum °C (°F)	8.6 (47.5)	9.1 (48.4)	8.4 (47.1)	6.7 (44.1)	5.4 (41.7)	3.8 (38.8)	3.0 (37.4)	3.1 (37.6)	3.6 (38.5)	4.7 (40.5)	6.0 (42.8)	7.1 (44.8)	5.8 (42.4)
Record low °C (°F)	0.4 (32.7)	1.9 (35.4)	0.1 (32.2)	−0.1 (31.8)	−1.9 (28.6)	−2.5 (27.5)	−5.0 (23.0)	−2.3 (27.9)	−2.4 (27.7)	−2.0 (28.4)	−0.7 (30.7)	−1.1 (30.0)	−5.0 (23.0)
Average precipitation mm (inches)	69.2 (2.72)	69.3 (2.73)	73.7 (2.90)	121.0 (4.76)	148.4 (5.84)	162.5 (6.40)	212.7 (8.37)	193.6 (7.62)	144.8 (5.70)	133.4 (5.25)	105.4 (4.15)	102.1 (4.02)	1,541.1 (60.67)
Average precipitation days (≥ 0.2 mm)	13.5	12.5	14.8	17.5	19.8	19.9	23.4	22.5	20.2	19.2	16.8	15.9	216
Mean monthly sunshine hours	257.3	214.7	192.2	150.0	111.6	99.0	108.5	127.1	144.0	198.4	210.0	226.3	2,039.1
Percentage possible sunshine	56	56	50	46	37	36	37	39	41	48	48	48	45
Source: Bureau of Meteorology (1934-1995)

== Road infrastructure ==
The C101 route (Oonah Road) passes through from north-east to south-west. Route C103 (Talunah Road) starts at an intersection with C101 and runs south before exiting. Route C104 (Guide Road) starts at an intersection with C101 and runs north before exiting.
