= Preolenna =

Preolenna Tasmania
- Coordinates: 41°5′6″S 145°33′22″E
- Population: 287 (2011)
- Postcode(s): 7325
- Elevation: 260 m (853 ft)
- Location: 25 km (16 mi) SW of Wynyard, Tasmania
- LGA(s): Waratah-Wynyard
- Region: North West Tasmania
- State electorate(s): Braddon
- Federal division(s): Braddon
Mean max temp	Mean min temp	Annual rainfall
14.9 °C; 59 °F	7.5 °C; 46 °F	1,598.3 mm 62.9 in
Localities around Preolenna:
Lapoinya	Moorleah	Calder
Meunna	Preolenna	Calder
West Takone	West Takone	Takone

Preolenna is a locality and small rural community of Waratah-Wynyard, Tasmania. It is located about 25 kilometres (16 mi) inland from the town of Wynyard. The 2011 census determined a population of 287 for the state suburb of Lapoinya, which the locality of Preolenna forms part of.

== History ==
Henry Hellyer traversed the region on an expedition in 1827. The location was noted for the presence of coal in the nearby Jessie Gorge/Maweena area and some 5000 acres of "first class milling" timber and "first class basaltic soils" (Loftus Hills, Government Surveyor, 1913).

The first grants of land were settled in 1910. In 1917 a tramway was constructed from Flowerdale to Preolenna to facilitate the coal mining operations, the track was later extended to Maweena in 1924. By the 1920s the community consisted of some 15 families and a local school which remained open until 1993.

The rail line was abandoned in 1931, as coal from the area lacked sufficient quality for viable use. Agricultural industry continued be the mainstay of local economic activity until the late 1990s, when the farms were gradually acquired by developers for eucalypt plantations.

=== Meunna ===
Eight farms were established at Preolenna for soldier settlement following World War II, referred to as the Preolenna Estate until being renamed to Meunna. The community hall was built by the settlers in 1955 and demolished in 1995, with a plaque now marking the location of the building. The Meunna locality is now unpopulated, with the exception of the Tarkine Wilderness Lodge, after the farms were acquired and converted to forestry plantation in the late 1990s.

=== Rural Youth Organisation of Tasmania ===
The origins of the Rural Youth Organisation of Tasmania lie with the establishment of the Preolenna Calf Club in the early 1930s by the headmaster of the local school. The first state conference was convened in the 1950s.

== Notable people ==
- Paul O'Halloran - a former Australian politician

== Climate ==
Climate data for Preolenna (1952-2001)
Month	Jan	Feb	Mar	Apr	May	Jun	Jul	Aug	Sep	Oct	Nov	Dec	Year
Record high °C (°F)	31.0 (87.8)	32.8 (91.0)	29.8 (85.6)	23.8 (74.8)	20.6 (69.1)	15.9 (60.6)	18.6 (65.5)	17.3 (63.1)	20.7 (69.3)	27.0 (80.6)	28.0 (82.4)	31.0 (87.8)	32.8 (91.0)
Mean daily maximum °C (°F)	19.4 (66.9)	20.0 (68.0)	18.2 (64.8)	15.5 (59.9)	13.1 (55.6)	10.8 (51.4)	10.2 (50.4)	10.7 (51.3)	12.2 (54.0)	14.5 (58.1)	16.1 (61.0)	17.9 (64.2)	14.9 (58.8)
Mean daily minimum °C (°F)	10.3 (50.5)	11.0 (51.8)	10.2 (50.4)	8.5 (47.3)	7.1 (44.8)	5.1 (41.2)	4.4 (39.9)	4.7 (40.5)	5.3 (41.5)	6.5 (43.7)	7.8 (46.0)	9.4 (48.9)	7.5 (45.5)
Record low °C (°F)	3.6 (38.5)	3.7 (38.7)	2.2 (36.0)	1.0 (33.8)	0.7 (33.3)	−1.8 (28.8)	−2.6 (27.3)	−1.8 (28.8)	−1.0 (30.2)	0.1 (32.2)	0.5 (32.9)	2.0 (35.6)	−2.6 (27.3)
Average precipitation mm (inches)	62.9 (2.48)	53.7 (2.11)	83.5 (3.29)	128.4 (5.06)	176.5 (6.95)	173.6 (6.83)	205.1 (8.07)	185.6 (7.31)	153.9 (6.06)	140.2 (5.52)	109.2 (4.30)	99.7 (3.93)	1,598.3 (62.93)
Source: Bureau of Meteorology
