= Table Cape =

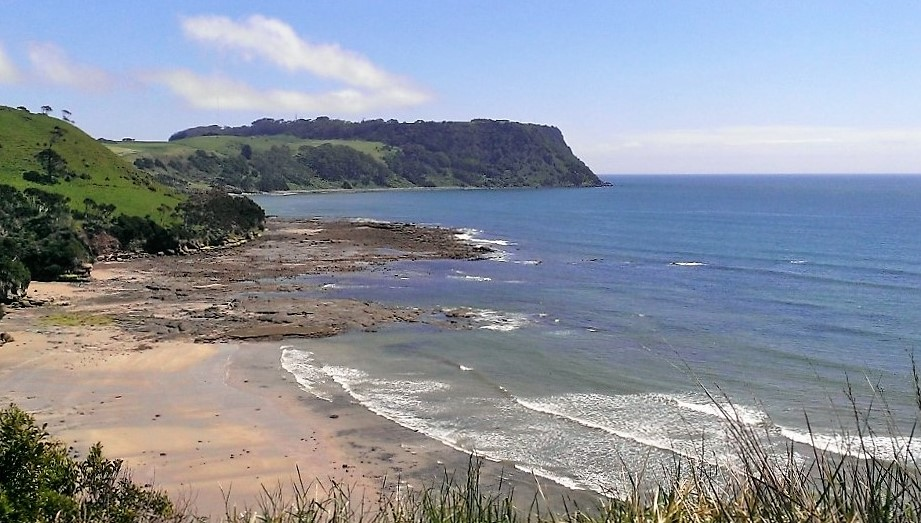
- Overlooking Freestone Cove from Fossil Bluff with Table Cape in the background

- Coordinates: 40°57′02″S 145°43′31″E
- Country: Australia
- State: Tasmania
- Region: North West Tasmania
- LGA: Waratah-Wynyard
- Location: 4 km (2.5 mi) N of Wynyard, Tasmania

Government
  - State electorate: Braddon
  - Federal division: Braddon
- Elevation: 180 m (590 ft)

Population
  - Total: 87 (2021)
- Postcode: 7325
Localities around Table Cape
Boat Harbour	Table Cape
Flowerdale	Wynyard	Wynyard

Table Cape is an extinct volcano located near Wynyard on the North West of Tasmania, Australia, it is also the name of the locality which encompasses the geological feature. Table Cape is a more or less circular extinct volcano with a flat top, its northern and eastern faces rise steeply from Bass Strait to a height of approximately 170 metres (560 ft) above sea level. It was named by British navigator, Matthew Flinders, as he and George Bass circumnavigated Van Diemen's Land (now Tasmania) in 1798 upon the Norfolk. Flinders also progressively named the nearby Circular Head, Three Hummock and Hunter Islands.

Table Cape's top and surrounding areas are composed of fertile basalt soils and are heavily cultivated, the area is renowned for the annual flowering of tulips during spring and accompanying tulip festival. Table Cape locality has a population of 87.

== Landscape and conservation ==
Whilst the top of Table Cape and surrounding district is heavily utilised for agriculture, the steep and rocky ocean-facing embankments remain largely undisturbed from human activity and are covered in dense scrubland. The 1.26 km^{2} Table Cape Conservation Area (IUCN IV) extends along the shoreline from Boat Harbour Beach to the Table Cape State Reserve (IUCN III) before continuing along to Freestone Cove near Fossil Bluff.

Beddomeia capensis is an endangered freshwater snail known only to occur along four small streams on Table Cape, and a tributary of Big Creek near Calder. However, recent surveys have only been able to identify the species at two unnamed streams near the Table Cape Lighthouse, with the total length of occupied stream less than 80 metres (260 ft). Population declines are due to habitat degradation from agricultural land usage and competition from other introduced hydrobiid snails.

=== Tommeginer Aboriginal clan ===
The territory of the Tommeginer clan of Aboriginal Tasmanians is located around the Table Cape region. The tribe most likely built the stone tidal fish traps that remain evident at nearby Freestone Cove.

== Table Cape Lighthouse ==
Table Cape Lighthouse is a Tasmanian heritage-listed lighthouse situated on the 120 hectare Table Cape State Reserve. It has been open for public tours since 2010.

After the wrecks of the Emma Prescott in 1867 and the schooner Orson in 1884, a lighthouse was commissioned to be constructed on Table Cape to aide navigation into the port of Wynyard on the Inglis River. Table Cape Lighthouse was designed by Huckson and Hutchinson of Hobart, the light apparatus was sourced from the Chance Brothers of England and was constructed by a local builder, John Luck. The project suffered from delays due to poor quality roads leading up to the construction site on Table Cape, and bricks of insufficient quality sourced from the specially-constructed kiln in the nearby town of Burnie, instead, bricks had to be imported from Victoria.

The lighthouse was first lit up on 1 August 1888, it stands about 25 metres (82 ft) high and has a diameter of 8.5 metres (28 ft) at the base. Seventeen days after the official opening, the head lighthouse keeper's 14-month-old son died from illness. The undertaker, who had travelled up to the lighthouse with a coffin for the child, encouraged the family to perform the burial nearby due to the appalling weather conditions at the time. The small gravesite remains to be found nearby today.

Originally powered by oil, Table Cape Lighthouse was converted to automatic acetylene operation in 1920. In 1923, the lightkeepers were withdrawn from manning the tower, and after several years of deterioration, the nearby keepers' cottages were demolished in 1926. In 1979, mains electricity was connected and an electric beacon with standby batteries was installed, the maximum nominal range of the 100W halogen lamp is approximately 16 nautical miles (30 km; 18 mi).

== Gallery ==
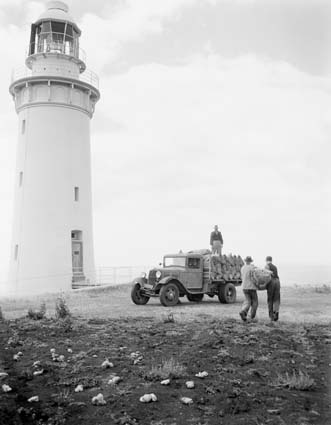
Table Cape Lighthouse in 1948

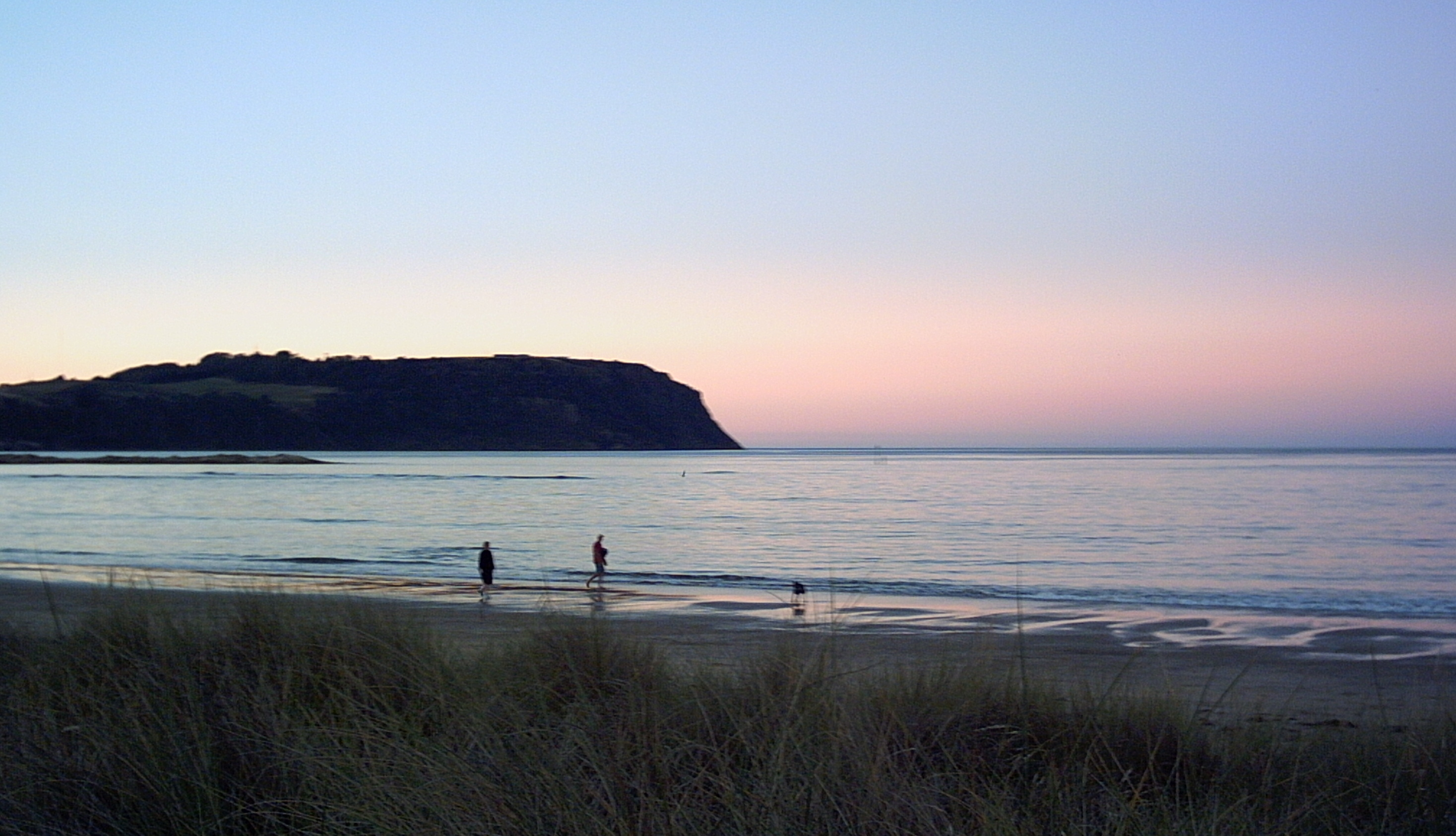
Table Cape by dusk

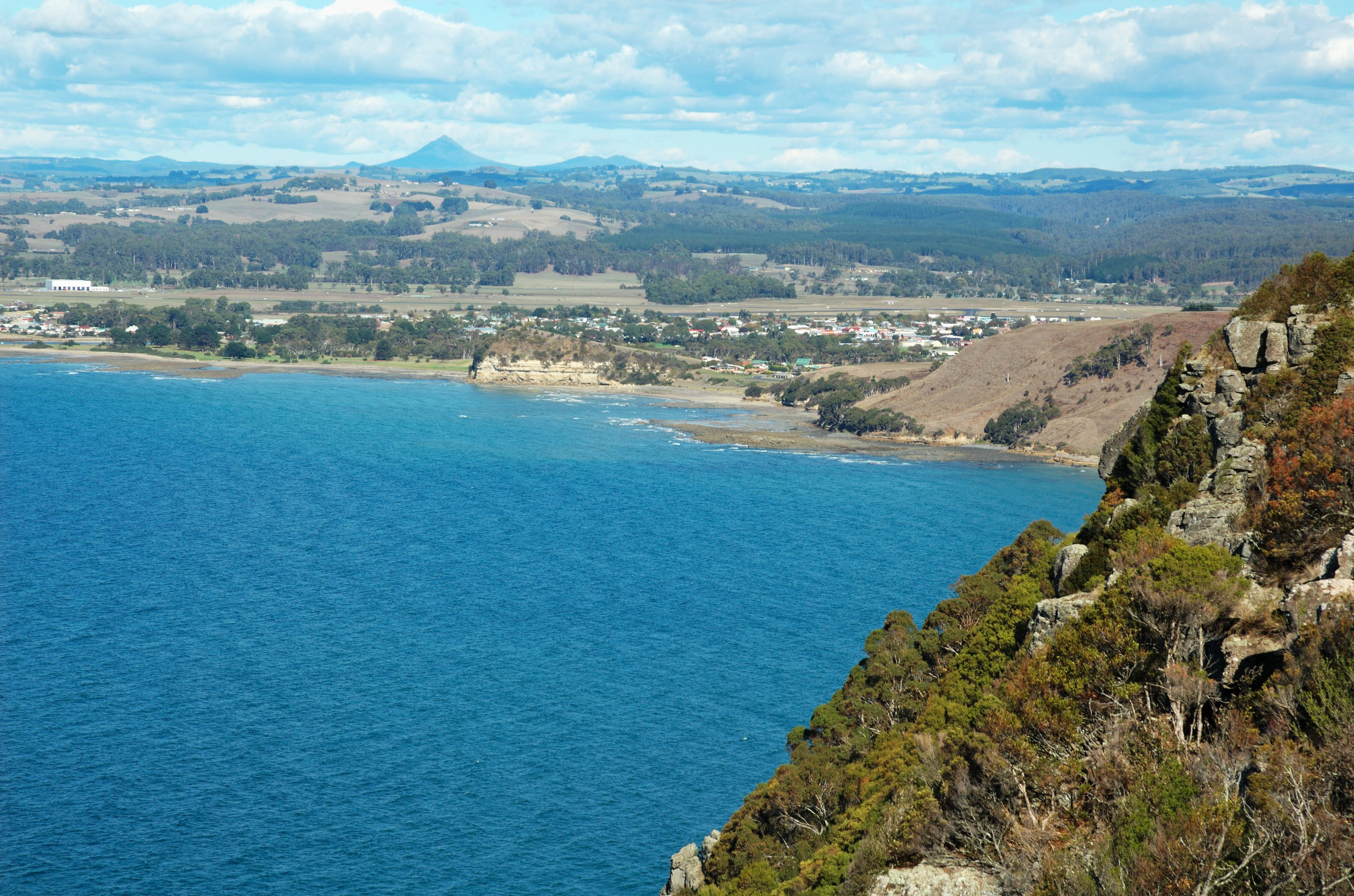
View from Table Cape lookout

== See also ==
- Protected areas of Tasmania
- List of lighthouses in Australia
