= Archibald McDowall =

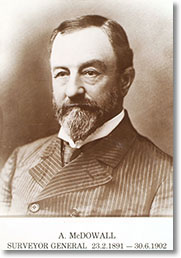
Archibald McDowall, Surveyor General of Queensland

Archibald McDowall (2 December 1841 – 13 May 1918) was a Surveyor General of Queensland (then a colony, now a state of Australia).

McDowall was born in Moonee Ponds, Melbourne, Victoria, Australia. Educated in Hobart, he studied surveying under James Erskine Calder, moving to Queensland in 1861. On 13 May 1862 McDowall joined the Queensland Surveyor-General's Department and was appointed commissioner of crown lands, West Maranoa. He introduced the standard steel tape for ground measurement to Queensland, replacing the chain.

McDowall was Surveyor General of Queensland from 23 February 1891 until retiring on 30 June 1902. He introduced the use of telegraphic time-signals for accurate longitude observations.
