= James Sprent =

James Sprent (1808 – 22 September 1863) was a Surveyor General of Tasmania, (then the colony of Van Diemen's Land, now a state of Australia).

== Early life ==
Sprent was born in Manchester, England and was educated at Glasgow University (M.A., 1825) and St John's College, Cambridge.

== Career in Australia ==
In May 1830 Sprent arrived in Van Diemen's Land (later renamed Tasmania).

He opened a school for boys that year, offering classes in Latin, Mathematics and French. Two years later, he extended this offering to young ladies and adult after school hours.

=== Surveying Work ===
After he was refused a free land grant in 1833, Sprent was appointed temporary assistant surveyor, closed his academy and began work on a trigonometrical survey - inspired by the Great Trigonometrical Survey of India.

Sprent and Calder located and cleared 50 mountaintop stations across the east of the state, leaving markers visibile from a distance, before work was suspended due to budget cuts in 1837. He was subsequently appointed permanent assistant surveyor.

=== Completing the Trigonometrical Survey ===
In 1847 Sprent was appointed first-class assistant surveyor. That year lieutenant-governor William Denison reestablished the trigonometrical survey, and Sprent and Calder continued surveying high points. Sprent began working in the previously unexplored south west Tasmania, becoming the first European to view Federation Peak, which he dubbed "the Obelisk".

In 1855 Sprent was appointed deputy Surveyor General, and the next year chief surveyor and acting Surveyor General, replacing Robert Power. At this time he had surveyed 206 high points which he considered necessary to calculate a detailed map. He retired from fieldwork and began to reside in Hobart.

In early 1859 Sprent's health deteriorated, and he was replaced by James Erskine Calder on 1 September 1859. A map based on his survey was published in June 1859.

== Personal life ==
Sprent married Susannah Hassall Oakes at St John's Cathedral, Parramatta, NSW on 2 March 1837.

He died in 1863 shortly after his retirement.
