= South Riana, Tasmania =

South Riana Tasmania
- Coordinates: 41°15′00″S 145°57′44″E
- Population: 214 (2016 census)
- Postcode(s): 7316
- Location: 50 km (31 mi) SW of Devonport
- LGA(s): Central Coast
- Region: North West
- State electorate(s): Braddon
- Federal division(s): Braddon
Localities around South Riana:
Upper Natone	Riana	Riana
Upper Natone	South Riana	Gunns Plains
Loyetea	Gunns Plains	Gunns Plains

South Riana is a rural locality and town in the local government area of Central Coast, in the North West region of Tasmania. It is located about 50 kilometres (31 mi) south-west of the town of Devonport. The 2016 census determined a population of 214 for the state suburb of South Riana.

== History ==
The locality was gazetted in 1966.

== Geography ==
The Blythe River forms part of the western boundary.

== Road infrastructure ==
The B17 route (Pine Road) enters from the north-east and runs through to the south as South Riana Road before exiting. Route C115 (a continuation of South Riana Road) starts at an intersection with B17 and runs west before exiting.
