= Myalla, Tasmania =

Myalla
- Town
- Coordinates: 40°58′42″S 145°34′03″E
- Country: Australia
- State: Tasmania
- Region: North West Tasmania
- LGA: Waratah-Wynyard
- Location: 19 km (12 mi) W of Wynyard

Government
  - State electorate: Braddon
  - Federal division: Braddon

Population
  - Total: 54 (2016 census)
- Postcode: 7325
Localities around Myalla
Sisters Creek	Sisters Creek	Sisters Creek
Sisters Creek, Milabena	Myalla	Lapoinya
Milabena	Lapoinya	Lapoinya

Myalla is a locality and small rural community in the local government area of Waratah-Wynyard, in the North West region of Tasmania. It is located about 19 kilometres (12 mi) west of the town of Wynyard. The 2016 census determined a population of 54 for the state suburb of Myalla.

== History ==
The locality name is derived from the Aboriginal words Myallanga Bourack, meaning "To Grow". The name has been in use since about 1908.

The community history has been recorded by locals.

== Road infrastructure ==
The C229 route (Myalla Road) runs south from the Bass Highway through the locality and provides access to many other localities.
