= Milabena =

Milabena Tasmania
- Coordinates: 41°02′S 145°31′E
- Population: 89 (2016 census)
- Postcode(s): 7325
- Location: 26 km (16 mi) W of Wynyard
- LGA(s): Waratah-Wynyard, Circular Head
- Region: North West
- State electorate(s): Braddon
- Federal division(s): Braddon
Localities around Milabena:
Montumana	Sisters Creek	Myalla
Mawbanna	Milabena	Lapoinya
Mawbanna	Meunna	Lapoinya

Milabena is a rural locality in the local government areas of Waratah-Wynyard and Circular Head in the North West region of Tasmania. It is located about 26 kilometres (16 mi) west of the town of Wynyard. First settled in the late 19th century, it has been a centre for forestry, mixed agriculture especially potato growing and grazing dairy cattle. The 2016 census determined a population of 89 for the state suburb of Milabena.

== History ==
The locality was originally known as Tuckers Hill. The name Milabena was in use by 1921 and was gazetted in 1966. Milabena Post Office opened on 1 June 1920 and closed in 1934.

== Geography ==
The ridge line of the Dip Range forms the western boundary. The Detention Falls, a cascade waterfall on the Detention River, is located in Milabena.

== Road infrastructure ==
The C229 route (Myalla Road) enters from the north-east and runs through to the south before exiting. Route C230 (Lapoinya Road) starts at an intersection with route C229 and runs south-east and north-east before exiting.
