= Beddomeia capensis =

Conservation status
- Endangered (IUCN 2.3)

Scientific classification
- Kingdom: Animalia
- Phylum: Mollusca
- Class: Gastropoda
- Subclass: Caenogastropoda
- Order: Littorinimorpha
- Family: Tateidae
- Genus: Beddomeia
- Species: B. capensis

Binomial name
- Beddomeia capensis Ponder & Clark, 1993

Species of gastropod

Beddomeia capensis is an aquatic operculate gastropod mollusk, a species of very small freshwater snail that has a gill and an operculum, in the family Hydrobiidae. The species is classified as endangered and known to be endemic to five streams within a relatively small area on the island state of Tasmania, Australia. However, recent surveys have only been able to locate Beddomeia capensis in two small streams on Table Cape, with the total length of inhabited stream less than 80 metres (260 ft).

== Description ==
B. capensis are small (1–7 mm) and difficult to identify to a species level in the field, being distinguished by a number of shell and anatomical characters. Their conical-shaped shells can be opaque to dark brown in colour. The shells are most often smooth, but may possess faint sculpturing. The shell is 2.21-2.71 mm long, 1.38-1.71 mm wide, with a protoconch of about 1.67 whorls.

The species is not sexually dimorphic in length, width or shape, the principal characters used to separate species of Beddomeia are the male and female reproductive systems, which require microscopic dissection of specimens.

== Population and habitat ==
B. capensis is known from two small streams on Table Cape, where they are located on and under stones, leaves and wood where it feeds actively, grazing on periphyton. Field observations indicate these snails have a preference for the underside and lower margins of rocks and stream debris.

Population recordings of Beddomeia capensis
| Site | Location | Tenure | Recordings | Extent of population hectares | Abundance |
|---|---|---|---|---|---|
| 1 | Unnamed stream, near Table Cape Lighthouse | Crown land, Private property | 1989, 2005, 2011 | < 0.001 | Moderate to high |
| 2 | Small stream on cliff face, below and slightly west of site 1 | Crown land, Private property | 1995, 2004 | < 0.001 | Moderate to high |
| 3 | Murdering Gully, Table Cape | Private property | 1989 | Unknown | Unknown |
| 4 | Unnamed small stream east of Table Cape | Private property | 1989 | Unknown | Unknown |
| 5 | Tributary of Big Creek | State forest | 1989 | Unknown | Unknown |

=== Threats ===
==== Habitat disturbance ====
The principal identified threats to freshwater molluscs are agricultural clearing, forestry, mining and impoundment construction. As the species is confined to small order streams, it is consequently at a higher risk of being impacted by habitat degradation and modification due to agricultural land practises. The two remaining sites where the species is known to occur are on remnant native riparian vegetation within cleared agricultural land. The loss of species at three previously recorded sites, is likely due to intensively modified stream channels resulting in loss of habitat and competition.

==== Interspecific competition ====
Owing to the restricted subpopulations of B. capensis, they are considered vulnerable to interspecific competition and displacement from the exotic P. antipodarum (New Zealand mud snail), as they occur in areas already subjected to water quality degradation which is favoured by the exotic species.

==== Stochastic risk ====
The fragmented distribution of the subpopulations of B. capensis offer no opportunity for genetic exchange between subpopulations, thus exposing the species to a risk of extinction.

== See also ==
- List of non-marine molluscs of Australia
- Threatened fauna of Australia
