= Guildford, Tasmania =

Guildford
- Town
- Coordinates: 41°27′20″S 145°41′31″E
- Country: Australia
- State: Tasmania
- Region: North-west and west
- LGA: Waratah–Wynyard
- Location: 81 km (50 mi) S of Wynyard

Government
  - State electorate: Braddon
  - Federal division: Braddon

Population
  - Total: nil (2016 census)
- Postcode: 7321
Localities around Guildford
West Coast	Hampshire, Parrawe	Loyetea
Waratah, West Coast	Guildford	Loongana, Middlesex
West Coast	West Coast	Middlesex

Guildford is a rural locality in the local government area (LGA) of Waratah–Wynyard in the North-west and west LGA region of Tasmania. The locality is about 81 kilometres (50 mi) south of the town of Wynyard. The 2016 census recorded a population of nil for the state suburb of Guildford.

== History ==
Guildford was gazetted as a locality in 1974. It was a railway station and junction on the Emu Bay Railway in West Coast Tasmania. It was an important junction to the Waratah Branch (Mount Bischoff) railway, and in turn a connection to the 2-foot (0.61 m) gauge Magnet Tramway (Operating 1901 to 1910s). The station and associated buildings no longer exist.

== Geography ==
The Arthur River forms part of the western boundary. The Hellyer River rises in the south of the locality and flows through to the north.

== Road infrastructure ==
The Murchison Highway (Route A10) passes through from north-west to south. Route B18 (Ridgley Highway) starts at an intersection with A10 and runs north-east until it exits. Route B23 (Waratah Road) starts at an intersection with A10 and runs south-west until it exits. Route C132 (Belvoir Road) passes through the south-east corner of the locality.

== Bibliography ==
- Atkinson, H.K. (1991). Railway Tickets of Tasmania. ISBN 0-9598718-7-X.
- Rae, Lou (1997). The Emu Bay Railway. ISBN 0-9592098-6-7.
- Along the Line in Tasmania. Book 2. Private Lines. Traction Publications. 1972. ISBN 0-85829-003-0.

== See also ==
- Railways on the West Coast of Tasmania
