= Edward Boyd (surveyor) =

Edward Boyd (1794 – 2 November 1871) was a Surveyor General of Tasmania, (then the colony of Van Diemen's Land, now a state of Australia).

== Early life ==
Boyd was born in England and educated at the Royal Military College, Sandhurst. He joined the British Army and became a captain in 1826 before retiring in 1829 to become deputy surveyor general in Van Diemen's Land.

== Career in Australia ==
In July 1829 Boyd arrived in Hobart. Four years later Boyd was in dispute with the Surveyor General George Frankland about having to open a survey branch in Launceston. Bad health prevented Boyd from surveying Launceston and he was transferred back to Hobart after his failure at Launceston. When Frankland died, Boyd became Surveyor General, however his poor performance led to the governor seeking a replacement (this was to be Robert Power in July 1841).

== Late life and legacy ==
Boyd rejoined the British Army and was promoted Major in the 29th (Worcestershire) Regiment of Foot in November 1841, seeing service in Ghazipur, India. Boyd retired in 1850; he received the rank of lieutenant-colonel in 1854. He died in London aged 77 on 2 November 1871 .
