= Loyetea, Tasmania =

Loyetea Tasmania
- Coordinates: 41°19′00″S 145°55′28″E
- Population: 20 (SAL 2021)
- Postcode(s): 7316
- Location: 42 km (26 mi) SW of Ulverstone
- LGA(s): Central Coast
- Region: North-west and west
- State electorate(s): Braddon
- Federal division(s): Braddon
Localities around Loyetea:
Upper Natone	South Riana	Gunns Plains
Hampshire, Upper Natone	Loyetea	Gunns Plains
Guildford	Loongana	Loongana

Loyetea is a rural locality in the local government area (LGA) of Central Coast in the North-west and west LGA region of Tasmania. The locality is about 42 kilometres (26 mi) south-west of the town of Ulverstone. The 2021 census recorded a population of 20 for the state suburb of Loyetea.

== History ==
Loyetea was gazetted as a locality in 1973. The locality was previously known as Milton or Lowana. Loyetea is believed to be an Aboriginal word for “love”.

The locality is a mountainous area used for logging.

== Geography ==
The Blythe River forms the western boundary.

== Road infrastructure ==
Route B17 (South Riana Road) passes to the north-east. From there, Loyetea Road provides access to the locality.
