= Calder River (Tasmania) =

River in Tasmania, Australia

Calder
- Location of the river mouth in Tasmania
- Etymology: James Erskine Calder

Location
- Country: Australia
- State: Tasmania

Physical characteristics
- Source: Campbell Ranges
  - location: near Henrietta
  - coordinates: 41°10′21″S 145°41′28″E
  - elevation: 340 m (1,120 ft)
- Mouth: Inglis River
  - location: near Calder
  - coordinates: 41°4′8″S 145°36′39″E
  - elevation: 71 m (233 ft)
- Length: 15 km (9.3 mi)

The Calder River is a river in North West Tasmania, Australia. It extends approximately 15 kilometres (9.3 mi) from the Campbell Ranges near Henrietta before reaching its confluence with the Inglis River near Calder. The river is transversed by the Murchison Highway in its upper reaches. Part of the course of the river is adjacent to the 65.21-hectare (161.1-acre) Calder River Conservation Area.

The river and the adjacent town was named in honour of James Erskine Calder, the Surveyor General of Tasmania between 1859 and 1870.

== See also ==
- List of rivers of Australia § Tasmania
