= Meunna =

- Town
- Coordinates: 41°04′50″S 145°30′07″E
- Country: Australia
- State: Tasmania
- Region: North-west and west
- LGA: Circular Head, Waratah–Wynyard
- Location: 74 km (46 mi) SE of Smithton

Government
  - State electorate: Braddon
  - Federal division: Braddon

Population
  - Total: 7 (2016 census)
- Postcode: 7325
Localities around Meunna
Mawbanna	Milabena	Lapoinya
Mawbanna	Meunna	Preolenna
West Coast	West Takone	West Takone

Meunna is a rural locality in the local government areas (LGA) of Circular Head and Waratah–Wynyard in the North-west and west LGA region of Tasmania. The locality is about 74 kilometres (46 mi) south-east of the town of Smithton. The 2016 census recorded a population of nil for the state suburb of Meunna.

== History ==
Eight farms were established at Preolenna for soldier settlement following World War II, referred to as the Preolenna Estate until being renamed to Meunna. The community hall was built by the settlers in 1955 and demolished in 1995, with a plaque now marking the location of the building. The Meunna locality is now unpopulated, with the exception of the Tarkine Wilderness Lodge, after the farms were acquired and converted to forestry plantation in the late 1990s.

Meunna was gazetted as a locality in 1961.

== Geography ==
The Flowerdale River forms most of the eastern boundary.

== Road infrastructure ==
The C229 route (Myalla Road / Meunna Road) passes through from north to south-east.
