= Waratah–Wynyard Council =

Waratah-Wynyard Council
- Local government area
- Interactive map of Waratah-Wynyard Council
- Coordinates: 41.3828°S 145.4956°E
- Country: Australia
- State: Tasmania
- Region: Wynyard and Waratah
- Established: 2 April 1993
- Council seat: Wynyard

Government
  - Mayor: Mary Duniam
  - State electorate: Braddon
  - Federal division: Braddon

Area
  - Total: 3,536 km^{2} (1,365 sq mi)

Population
  - Total: 13,800 (2018)
  - Density: 3.903/km^{2} (10.11/sq mi)
- Website: Waratah-Wynyard Council
LGAs around Waratah-Wynyard Council
		Burnie
Circular Head	Waratah-Wynyard Council	Central Coast
West Coast	West Coast	Kentish

Waratah–Wynyard Council is a local government body in Tasmania, situated in the north-west of the state. Waratah-Wynyard is classified as a rural local government area and has a population of 13,800, the major towns and localities of the region include Savage River, Sisters Beach, Somerset, Waratah and the principal town of Wynyard.

== History and attributes ==
On 2 April 1993, the municipalities of Waratah and Wynyard were amalgamated to form the Waratah–Wynyard Council. There had been suggestion of renaming the council to Table Cape, which was the former name of the Wynyard Council until 1945, but this move failed at the ballot box.

Waratah-Wynyard is classified as rural, agricultural and very large under the Australian Classification of Local Governments.

=== Logo ===
Waratah-Wynyard Council logo (1987–2017)

The former logo of the council was selected from 124 competition entries in 1987. The enlarged "W" below Table Cape is indicative of ploughed paddocks representing the rural heritage – a lighthouse and a seagull were added to the final design. The word "Waratah" was added in 1993 following the amalgamation of the councils.

== Government ==
The current mayor is Mary Duniam and the current deputy mayor is Celisa Edwards. Other sitting councillors are Kevin Hyland, Michael Johnstone, Leanne Raw, Andrea Courtney, Gary Bramich and Dillon Roberts. All councillors will be up for re-election in 2026.

=== Previous mayors ===
- C.G. Dixon (1993 – 1999)
- M.I. Fenton (1999 – 2000)
- Roger Chalk (October 2000 – October 2005)
- Kevin Hyland (October 2005 – December 2010)
- Robby Walsh (2011 – 2022)

== Entities ==
Waratah–Wynyard Council operates the Wonders of Wynyard Exhibition and Visitor Information Centre at 8 Exhibition Link, Wynyard. The centre hosts a monthly local artwork exhibit and the Ransley Veteran Car Collection on permanent display.

== Localities ==
Locality	Census population 2011	Reason
Sisters Creek	201	Includes Myalla
Sisters Beach	439	
Boat Harbour Beach	429	Includes in Boat Harbour
Boat Harbour, Tasmania		Incl. in Boat Harbour Beach
Flowerdale	324	Includes Table Cape
Table Cape		Incl. in Flowerdale
Wynyard	5,990	Includes Seabrook, Doctors Rocks
Seabrook		Incl. in Wynyard
Somerset	3,975	
Doctors Rocks		Incl. in Wynyard
Elliott	350	
Yolla	337	
Henrietta	236	Includes Oonah, Parrawe, West Takone, Takone
Oonah		Incl. in Henrietta
Parrawe		Incl. in Henrietta
Guildford		Incl. in Waratah
Corinna		Incl. in Waratah
Savage River		Incl. in Waratah
West Takone		Incl. in Henrietta
Takone		Incl. in Henrietta
Meunna		Incl. in Lapoinya
Preolenna		Incl. in Lapoinya
Calder	375	Includes Kellatier, Moorleah
Kellatier		Incl. in Calder
Oldina	111	
Milabena		Incl. in Lapoinya
Lapoinya	287	Includes Meunna, Preolenna, Milabena
Moorleah		Incl. Calder
Myalla		Incl. in Sisters Creek
Mount Hicks	353	
Waratah	298	Includes Guildford, Corinna, Savage River
Total	13,705	
	3	Variance
Local government total	13,708	Gazetted Central Coast local government area

=== Not in above list ===
- Hampshire
- Luina
- Montumana
- Rocky Cape
- West Coast

== See also ==
- Local government areas of Tasmania
