= Henrietta, Tasmania =

Henrietta Tasmania
- Coordinates: 41°09′59″S 145°41′13″E
- Population: 132 (2016 census)
- Postcode(s): 7325
- Location: 25 km (16 mi) S of Wynyard
- LGA(s): Waratah-Wynyard
- Region: North West
- State electorate(s): Braddon
- Federal division(s): Braddon
Localities around Henrietta:
Takone	Yolla	Yolla
Takone	Henrietta	Tewkesbury
Oonah	Oonah	Tewkesbury

Henrietta is a rural locality in the local government area of Waratah-Wynyard in the North West region of Tasmania. It is located about 25 kilometres (16 mi) south of the town of Wynyard. The 2016 census determined a population of 132 for the state suburb of Henrietta.

== History ==
The locality was gazetted in 1966 and re-gazetted with corrections in 1974.

== Geography ==
The Cam River forms the south-eastern and eastern boundaries.

== Road infrastructure ==
The A10 route (Murchison Highway) enters from the north and runs through to the south-west before exiting. Route C106 (East Yolla Road) starts at an intersection with Route A10 and runs south-east, south, east and north before exiting to the north-east. Route C236 starts at an intersection with Route A10 and runs north-west before exiting.
