= Parrawe, Tasmania =

Parrawe
- Town
- Coordinates: 41°17′56″S 145°33′43″E
- Country: Australia
- State: Tasmania
- Region: North-west and west
- LGA: Burnie, Waratah–Wynyard
- Location: 58 km (36 mi) SW of Burnie

Government
  - State electorate: Braddon
  - Federal division: Braddon

Population
  - Total: nil (2016 census)
- Postcode: 7321
Localities around Parrawe
West Takone	Oonah, West Takone	Oonah
West Coast	Parrawe	Hampshire
West Coast	Guildford	Guildford

Parrawe is a rural locality in the local government areas (LGA) of Burnie and Waratah–Wynyard in the North-west and west LGA region of Tasmania. The locality is about 58 kilometres (36 mi) south-west of the town of Burnie. The 2016 census recorded a population of nil for the state suburb of Parrawe.

== History ==
Parrawe was gazetted as a locality in 1974. The name was used for a parish in 1904, and for the locality by 1929. It is believed to be an Aboriginal word for "abstain" or "cease".

== Geography ==
The Arthur River forms most of the western boundary. The Hellyer River, a tributary of the Arthur, forms the eastern boundary.

== Road infrastructure ==
Route A10 (Murchison Highway) runs through from north-east to south.
