= Burnie/Yeoman Cricket Club =

- Founded: 1989
- Team history: Burnie Cricket Club and Yeoman Cricket Club merged
- Based in: West Park Oval Burnie Tasmania
- Colours: Purple and Black (originally Maroon and Grey)
- Head coach: Shaun "Horn" Redman
- Captain: Nick "Papi" Revell

Burnie/Yeoman Cricket Club (BYCC) is a cricket team which represents Burnie in the North Western Tasmanian Cricket Association grade cricket competition, in the Australian state of Tasmania.

== History Burnie Yeoman ==
The Burnie Yeoman Cricket Club was formed in 1989 when the Burnie Cricket Club and the Yeoman Cricket Clubs decided after many meetings to combine and form the Burnie Yeoman Cricket Club to be based at the Les Clarke Oval at Cooee, a suburb of the city of Burnie on the North West Coast of Tasmania A state of Australia.

== Honours ==
NWTCA Premierships:

== See also ==
- Cricket Tasmania
