= Robert Power (surveyor) =

British Army Officer and colonial surveyor (1794–1869)

- Born: 1794; Knockbrit, Kingdom of Ireland
- Died: 15 February 1869 (aged 74–75); Hobart, Tasmania, Australia
- Relatives: Marguerite Gardiner, Countess of Blessington (sister); Marguerite Helen Power (granddaughter)
- Military career
- Allegiance: United Kingdom
- Branch: British Army
- Units: Leitrim Rifle Militia; 91st (Argyllshire Highlanders) Regiment of Foot; 20th Regiment of Foot

Robert Power (1794 – 15 February 1869) was a British Army officer and Surveyor General of Tasmania, (then the colony of Van Diemen's Land, now a state of Australia).

== Early life ==
Power was born in Knockbrit, Kingdom of Ireland, to Edmund Power and Ellen Sheehy. His father was a landowner and the sometime editor of the Clonmel Gazette. His mother was the daughter of Edmund Sheehy, who was executed as an accessory to Nicholas Sheehy, his cousin. He was the brother of the Marguerite Gardiner, the Countess of Blessington, a novelist, biographer and a literary hostess. His granddaughter Marguerite Helen Power was named for his sister.

== Military career ==
Power joined the Leitrim Rifle Militia before volunteering with the 91st (Argyllshire Highlanders) Regiment of Foot. Power was commissioned lieutenant in the 73rd (Perthshire) Regiment of Foot in 1815, then as captain in 1817 in the 20th Regiment of Foot. While serving in the 20th Regiment of Foot, he was stationed on the island of Saint Helena, as a captain in the Saint Helena Regiment.

In 1823 Power resigned from the army, in 1838 he was appointed at the rate of 300 pounds deputy-commissioner of crown lands and forests and deputy surveyor general in the British North American province of New Brunswick.

== Career in Tasmania ==
In 1840 Power was sent to Van Diemen's Land (later renamed Tasmania), he arrived in Hobart in June 1841. Power was gazetted as Surveyor General of Van Diemen's Land in July 1841, after replacing the ineffective Edward Boyd. Power introduced a system of land leases which greatly increased revenue as the depression of the preceding years eased. He remained as Surveyor General until 1 July 1857. Power was appointed Serjeant-at-arms of the Tasmanian House of Assembly, in July 1866 he became Usher of the black rod. Power died in Hobart on 15 February 1869.
