= Sheffield Cricket Club (Tasmania) =

- Founded: 1950
- Based in: Sheffield, Tasmania
- Home ground: Sheffield Recreation Ground
- Colours: Green and Gold
- Head coach: Marc Simonds
- Captain: Alex King (Men’s) Georgia King (Women’s)
- NWTCA Titles: 1957 / 58, 1989 / 90, 2006/07, 2007/08, 2008 /09
- 2022/23: Semi Finalist

Sheffield Cricket Club (SCC) is a cricket team which represents Sheffield in the North Western Tasmanian Cricket Association grade cricket competition, in the Australian state of Tasmania. Based under Mount Roland the Sheffield Cricket Club continue to punch above their weight against clubs with a much larger population base. In a recent transformation, the club reinvigorated the community by introducing 5 new teams including two senior female, men’s social and U12 and U14 teams. These additional teams complimented the two senior men’s and U16 teams taking the club to 8 teams along with over 20 players in the Woolworths Blast program.

In addition to the rise in player numbers, the club driven by quality off-field leadership has undertaken a range of facility upgrades including new changing rooms and indoor centre along with pitch and oval upgrades.

Driven by the heart of the community, the SCC remains a destination club with many players travelling from outside the region to represent the green and gold.

== Honours ==
NWTCA Premierships: 5

== See also ==
- Cricket Tasmania
