= Upper Natone =

- Town
- Coordinates: 41°13′35″S 145°54′14″E
- Country: Australia
- State: Tasmania
- Region: North West
- LGA: Burnie
- Location: 24 km (15 mi) S of Burnie

Government
  - State electorate: Braddon
  - Federal division: Braddon

Population
  - Total: 111 (SAL 2021)
- Postcode: 7321
Localities around Upper Natone
East Ridgley	Natone, Upper Stowport	Riana
Highclere	Upper Natone	Riana, South Riana, Loyetea
Hampshire	Hampshire, Loyetea	Loyetea

Upper Natone is a locality and small rural community in the local government area of Burnie in the North West region of Tasmania. It is located about 24 kilometres (15 mi) south of the town of Burnie.

== History ==
The locality was gazetted in 1966.

The 2016 census determined a population of 112 for the state suburb of Upper Natone. At the 2021 census, the population had dropped to 111.

== Geography ==
The Blythe River forms the eastern boundary, and the Emu River forms much of the western boundary.

== Road infrastructure ==
The C102 route (Upper Natone Road) passes through from north to south-west. Route C115 (South Riana Road) starts at an intersection with C102 and runs south-east before exiting.
