= Boat Harbour Beach =

- Town
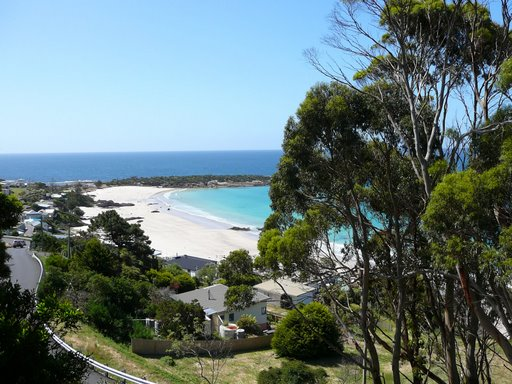
- Boat Harbour Beach

- Coordinates: 40°56′S 145°37′E
- Country: Australia
- State: Tasmania
- Region: North West Tasmania
- LGA: Waratah-Wynyard
- Location: 15 km (9.3 mi) from Wynyard

Government
  - State electorate: Braddon
  - Federal division: Braddon

Population
  - Total: 429 (2011 census)
- Postcode: 7321
Localities around Boat Harbour Beach
| Boat Harbour | Boat Harbour Beach | Boat Harbour |
| Boat Harbour | Boat Harbour | Boat Harbour |

Boat Harbour Beach is a small seaside township located about 15 kilometres (9.3 mi) from Wynyard on the north-west coast of Tasmania. "Boat Harbour" is the name of the locality which surrounds the township. In the 2011 census, Boat Harbour Beach, Boat Harbour and the nearby districts had a population of 429.

Boat Harbour Primary School is a rural government funded public school situated at 17386 Bass Highway Boat Harbour Tasmania 7321. Located nearby are the Boat Harbour fire brigade and Boat Harbour post shop, which first opened on 1 November 1878.

== History ==
Boat Harbour was originally named Jacobs' Boat Harbour after Captain John Jacobs, master of small vessels owned by the Van Diemen's Land Company. The vessels were used for trading between the VDL establishments at Circular Head and Woolnorth with Launceston, Tasmania between the late 1820s and the 1840s.

== Gallery ==
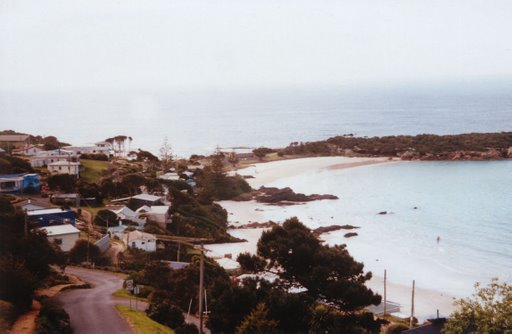
Overlooking Boat Harbour Beach on 14 June 1997

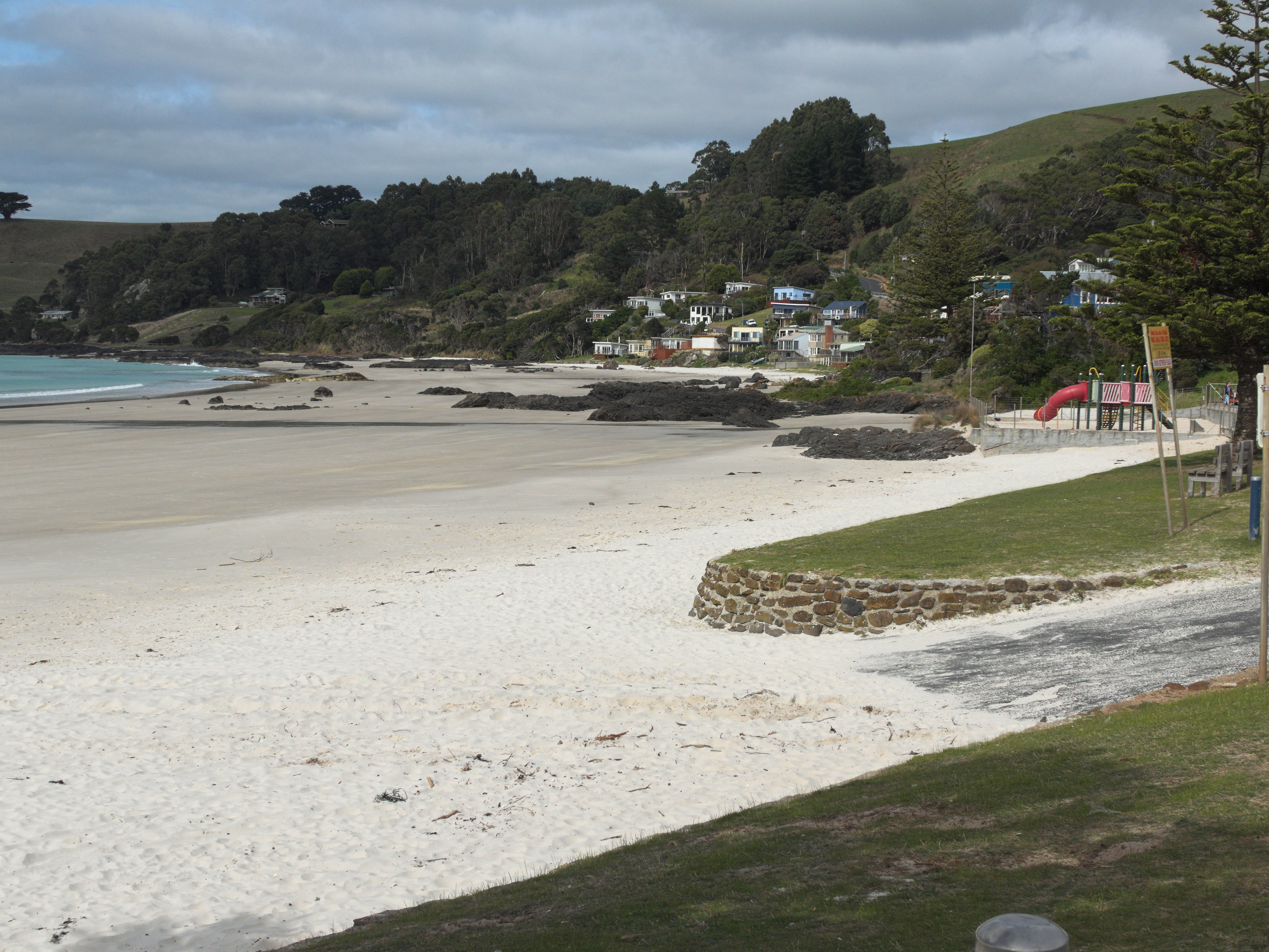
The shoreline of Boat Harbour Beach
