= Coast FM Tasmania =

Coast FM Tasmania (7DBS)

Wynyard, Tasmania; Australia
- Frequency: 106.1 MHz

Programming
- Language: English
- Format: Community

Ownership
- Owner: Coastal FM Inc

History
- First air date: 1990
- Call sign meaning: 7 for Tasmania plus Devonport Burnie Smithton

Technical information
- Licensing authority: ACMA
- ERP: 10,000 watts
- Transmitter coordinates: 40.990021°S 145.724197°E
- Repeaters: 88.9 MHz FM Smithton; 104.7 MHz FM Devonport

Links
- Public licence information: Profile
- Webcast: Live Online Stream
- Website: www.coastfm.org

Coast FM is a Tasmanian community radio station broadcasting all across the North-West coast from the studio in Wynyard. The station's hosts are volunteers.

== History ==
Coast FM was previously known as Coastal FM.

=== Volunteering ===
The station is run by a number of volunteers who dedicate their time to supply programs each week.

== Programming ==
The station's programmes are aimed at the general community. A mixture of old and new music is played through the day and evening. Most programmes include news and weather as well as competitions. There are several multilingual programmes such as Monday's The Celtic Connection. Band and Classical music is played every Sunday morning. The Station's Sport Director brings to the area all the local sport each Saturday morning and when a major event is being held.

== Frequencies ==
- 7DBS 88.9 MHz Broadcasts from Smithton and covers all of Circular Head.
- 7DBS 104.7 MHz Broadcasts from Devonport and covers many surrounding towns.
- 7DBS 106.1 MHz Broadcasts from Wynyard and covers the North West Coast.

== Website ==
The station streams online using a free shoutcast provider.
