= Surveyor General of Queensland =

Surveyor General of Queensland is a position originally created for the colony of Queensland, now a state of Australia. The position was the most senior surveyor within the Queensland Public Service.

== List of Surveyors General of Queensland ==
| Surveyor General | Period in office | Notes |
|---|---|---|
| Sir Augustus Charles Gregory | 1859–1875 | |
| William Alcock Tully | 1875–1889 | (acting 12 March 1875 – 8 July 1880) |
| William Montgomery Davenport Davidson | 1889–1891 | |
| Archibald McDowall | 1891–1902 | |
| Allan Alfred Spowers | 1902–1926 | Chief Surveyor until 1907, son-in-law of Davidson above. 1902 to 1907 the office was downgraded to Chief Surveyor (subordinate to Dept of Lands) |
| Frank Beresford Campbell-Ford | 1926–1929 | acting |
| John Percival Harvey | 1929–1959 | |
| Eric Douglas Mellor | 1958–1961 | acting |
| Torleif Hein | 1961–1964 | b. Norway 1898, to Australia 1899 |
| William Barcham | 1965 – 1966 | |
| Alec Barr Yeates | 1966–1975 | |
| John Macquarie "Mac" Serisier | 1 July 1975 – 1982 | also Director of Mapping & Surveying before 1980 |
| Kevin John Davies | 1982–1990 | |
| Neil Graham Divett | 1990–1993 | The position was abolished in 1993 |

== See also ==
- Surveyor General of New South Wales
- Surveyor General of South Australia
- Surveyor General of Tasmania
- Surveyor General of the Northern Territory
- Surveyor General of Victoria
- Surveyor General of Western Australia
