= Coast FM (Tenerife) =

Radio station in Tenerife

- Tenerife; Spain
- Broadcast area: Canary Islands
- Frequencies: 87.9 MHz, 97.9 MHz, 102.3 MHz, 102.5 MHz, 102.6 MHz, 102.8 MHz, 103.0 MHz, DAB, 6230 kHz

Programming
- Language: English
- Format: Adult contemporary

Links
- Website: www.coast.fm

Coast FM is an English language radio station based in Tenerife.

The station is based in studios in both Gran Canaria and Tenerife broadcasting 24 hours a day with a live and voice tracked service, using commercial radio presenters based in Tenerife, Gran Canaria and in the UK.

Past presenters include: Matt Fletcher (Afternoons), Gordon Slayney, Jadene Littlejohn (Live Drive-time), Simon Rowe (Evenings) & Ryan Woodman (Breakfast). Local news was broadcast throughout the day along with Sky News at the top of the hour. The station broadcast the syndicated programme "The Airplay 40 Chart" with Spencer James on a Saturday evening.

In March 2013 Coast FM and sister station Energy FM were sold to new owners

At the end of February 2014, the station dropped its on-air branding and then broadcast on air with no identity in preparation of the much-anticipated transformation into an internationally branded radio station as part of the 'Virgin' brand.

In July 2014, the station went off air.

In 2015 the station was relaunched by its previous owners and now broadcasts to all 7 Canary islands from studios in Tenerife and Gran Canaria on both FM and DAB. Coast FM was the first radio station in the Canary islands to be available on DAB digital radio.

The current lineup includes Dave Sherwood, Ryan Woodman, Andy, Ron, Greg Martins and Mark Walker.

Along with UK news from Sky the station broadcasts local news produced by its own news gathering operation

The station boasts a 42% market reach .
