= Hampshire, Tasmania =

Hampshire
- Suburb
- Interactive map of Hampshire
- Coordinates: 41°15′20″S 145°46′24″E
- Country: Australia
- State: Tasmania
- Region: North-west and west
- City: Burnie
- LGA: Waratah Wynyard, Burnie
- Location: 30 km (19 mi) SW of Burnie

Government
  - State electorate: Braddon
  - Federal division: Braddon

Population
  - Total: 51 (2016 census)
- Postcode: 7321
Suburbs around Hampshire
Tewkesbury	Highclere, Tewkesbury	Upper Natone
Tewkesbury, Parrawe	Hampshire	Upper Natone, Loyetea
Parrawe	Guildford	Loyetea

Hampshire is a semi-rural locality in the local government areas (LGA) of Waratah Wynyard and Burnie in the North-west and west LGA region of Tasmania. The locality is about 30 kilometres (19 mi) south-west of the town of Burnie. The 2016 census recorded a population of 51 for the state suburb of Hampshire.

== History ==
Hampshire was gazetted as a locality in 1973. It was first settled by Europeans in the late 1820s when rolling plains were mistakenly believed to be good grazing ground for sheep by the surveyors of the Van Diemen's Land Company. In fact, the open lands were the result of generations of burning off the natural temperate rainforest by the indigenous Aboriginal population of the area, and it proved totally unsuitable for the chosen purpose. In later years its fertile soils have been used for a variety of agricultural uses although it is currently mostly used for timber plantations.

Hampshire Post Office opened on 10 January 1921 and closed in 1969.

Hampshire was home to one of Gunns woodchip export mills that chipped eucalypt forest residues that were exported to Japan to be used as paper pulp in the paper making process.

== Geography ==
The Blythe River forms most of the eastern boundary. The Hellyer River forms most of the western and part of the southern boundary. The Emu River flows through from south-west to north-east.

== Road infrastructure ==
The Ridgley Highway (B18) passes through from north-east to south-west. Route C102 (Upper Natone Road) starts at an intersection with B18 and runs east until it exits. Route C103 (Talunah Road) starts at an intersection with B18 and runs west until it exits.
