= James Erskine Calder =

- Born: 8 June 1808; Great Marlow, Buckinghamshire, England
- Died: 20 February 1882 (aged 73); Hobart, Tasmania, Australia
- Occupation(s): Surveyor, geographer
- Spouse(s): Elizabeth Margaret née Pybus (died 1891) married 8 January 1838
- Children: 5 (or more) natural children
- Parent: Alexander Calder

James Erskine Calder (8 June 1808 – 20 February 1882) was a Surveyor General of the Colony of Tasmania, now an Australian state.

== Early life ==
James Calder was born in Great Marlow, Buckinghamshire, England, the ninth of eleven children of Alexander Calder, a quartermaster at the Royal Military College. James Calder was educated at village schools and from 1822 to 1826 at the college after it had moved to Sandhurst. Calder then joined the Ordnance Survey in England; his interest in this work led his father to seek an appointment from the Colonial Office for James in one of the colonies.

== Career in Australia ==
1875 book by J. E. Calder

On 5 June 1829 Calder accepted an appointment as assistant surveyor in Van Diemen's Land (now Tasmania). In July he sailed in the Thames for Hobart Town, at half pay on the voyage. On 21 November he took up his position at full pay under the Surveyor General of Tasmania, Edward Dumaresq.

Calder had a strong physique and gained a reputation for taking on difficult work. He cut a track through the mountains to prepare for Lieutenant-Governor Sir John Franklin's proposed expedition to Macquarie Harbour on the West Coast, Tasmania. On the journey in 1842, Calder once travelled 77 kilometres (48 mi) in 54 hours to bring a return load of supplies weighing 36 kilograms (79 lb), at the same time cutting a section of new track and securing bridges.

On 1 September 1859, Calder was appointed Surveyor General, succeeding James Sprent. Calder appointed reliable surveyors in the districts, providing a good foundation for future survey systems.

== Late life and legacy ==
On 30 June 1870, the position of Surveyor General was abolished and Calder accepted the role of Serjeant-at-arms in parliament. Calder died on 20 February 1882, survived by his wife, two sons and three daughters. Calder River is named in his honour.
