= Sisters Beach, Tasmania =

Sisters Beach
- Town
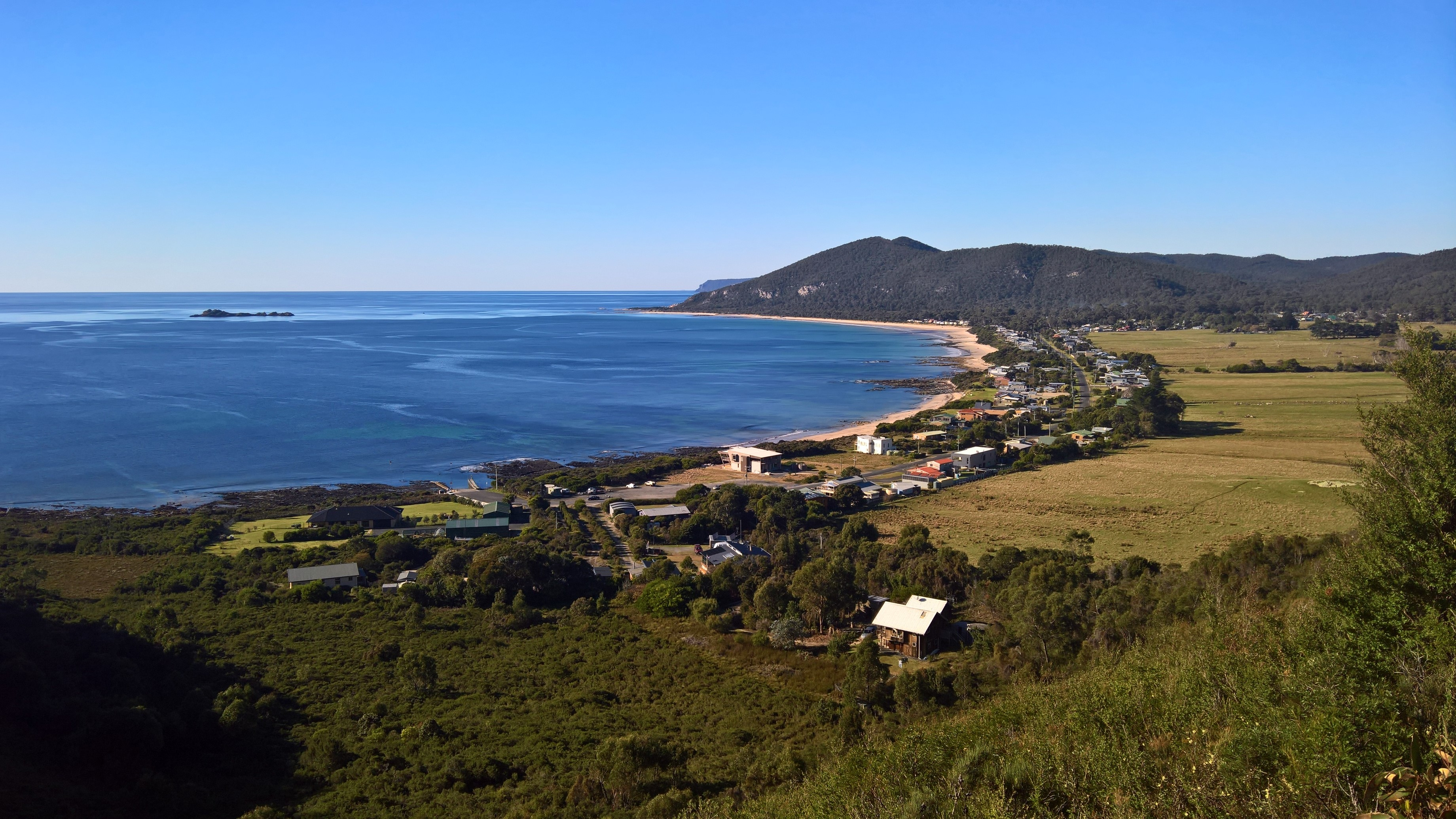
- Overlooking Sisters Beach

- Coordinates: 40°55′S 145°33′E
- Country: Australia
- State: Tasmania
- LGA: Waratah-Wynyard Council
- Location: 339 km (211 mi) NW of Hobart; 184 km (114 mi) W of Launceston; 85 km (53 mi) W of Devonport; 25 km (16 mi) W of Wynyard

Government
  - State electorate: Braddon
  - Federal division: Braddon

Population
  - Total: 511 (2021 census)
- Postcode: 7321

Sisters Beach is a locality and small town located in the Waratah-Wynyard municipality of Tasmania within fifteen minutes of Wynyard, in Tasmania's North West. It is located within the Rocky Cape National Park and derives its name from the two near identical Sisters Hills, which were named by Matthews Flinders (Chart of van Diemens Land by M Flinders, south coast sheet VI, published in 1814).

It has a beach of white sand, approximately three kilometres in length.

It is situated on the old trail known as the Postman's Track that once formed the only land connection between Emu Bay (now Burnie) and the Van Diemen's Land Company outpost of Stanley. This track was established in the Late 1820s and was a walking track only for the first 30 years of its existence. Later it evolved and was feasible for horses. In those days the postman used to walk. The best known of these was Paddy the Tinker, especially for being attacked by run away convicts at Sisters Beach in 1853. His name lives on with the Hill known as Tinkers Lookout.

In the latter part of the 1800s, Sisters Beach was home to short lived slate mining operation and all the land was taken up for seasonal cattle grazing. The only lasting legacy of these cattlemen was the fish trap.

In the 1930s the Irby family purchased much of the land and constructed the access road by hand. Subsequently subdivision started and the existing township steadily developed.

A unique aspect of Sisters Beach is the prevalence of giant Banksia serrata. It is the only place in Tasmania where they occur.

As of the 2021 census, Sisters Beach had a population of 511. Building new homes is currently restricted due to the surrounding Rocky Cape National Park. It was originally established by the Irby family, descendants of whom still live in the area.

== Gallery ==
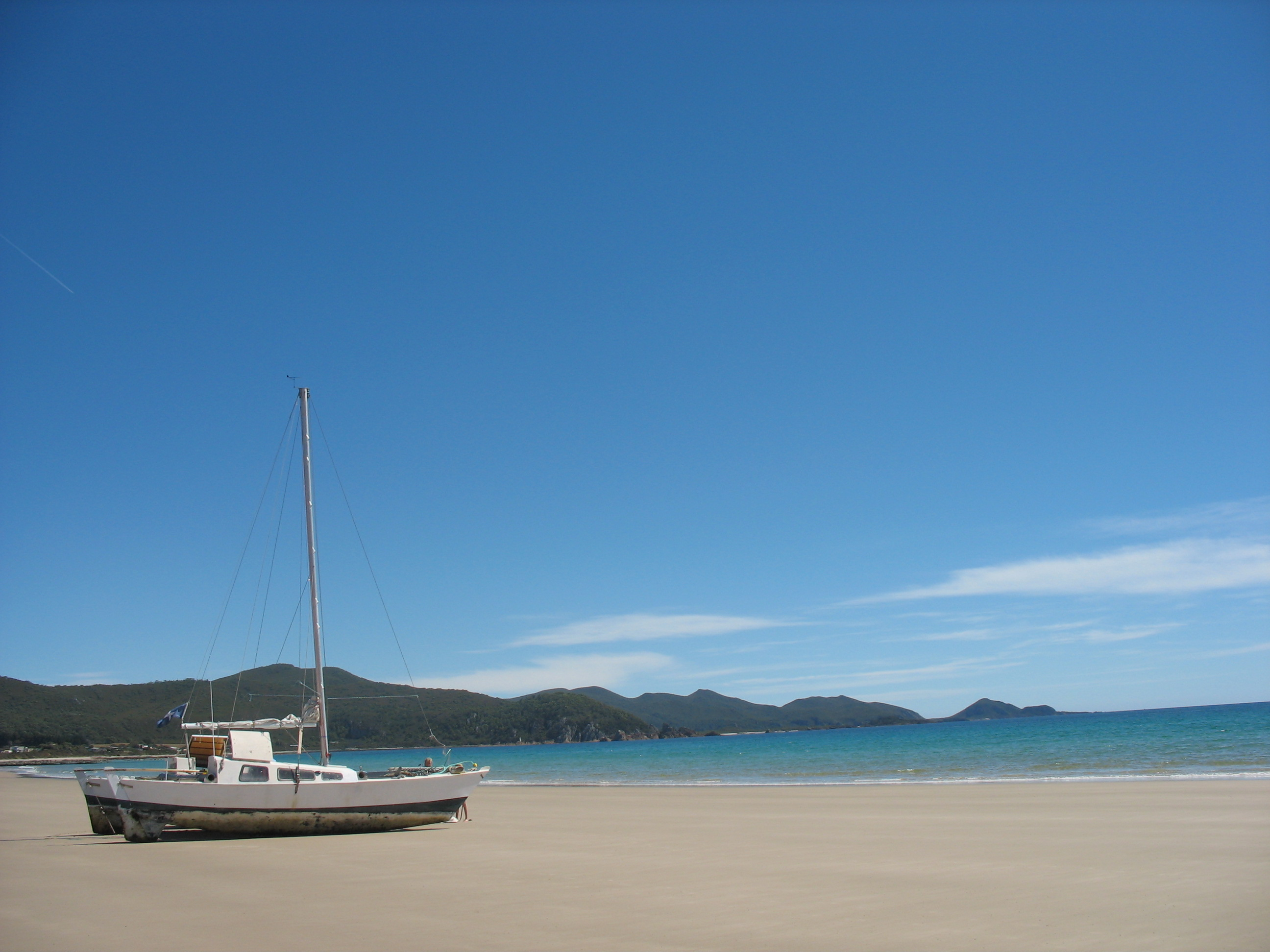
Sisters Beach, March 2006
