= Flowerdale River =

River in Tasmania, Australia

Flowerdale
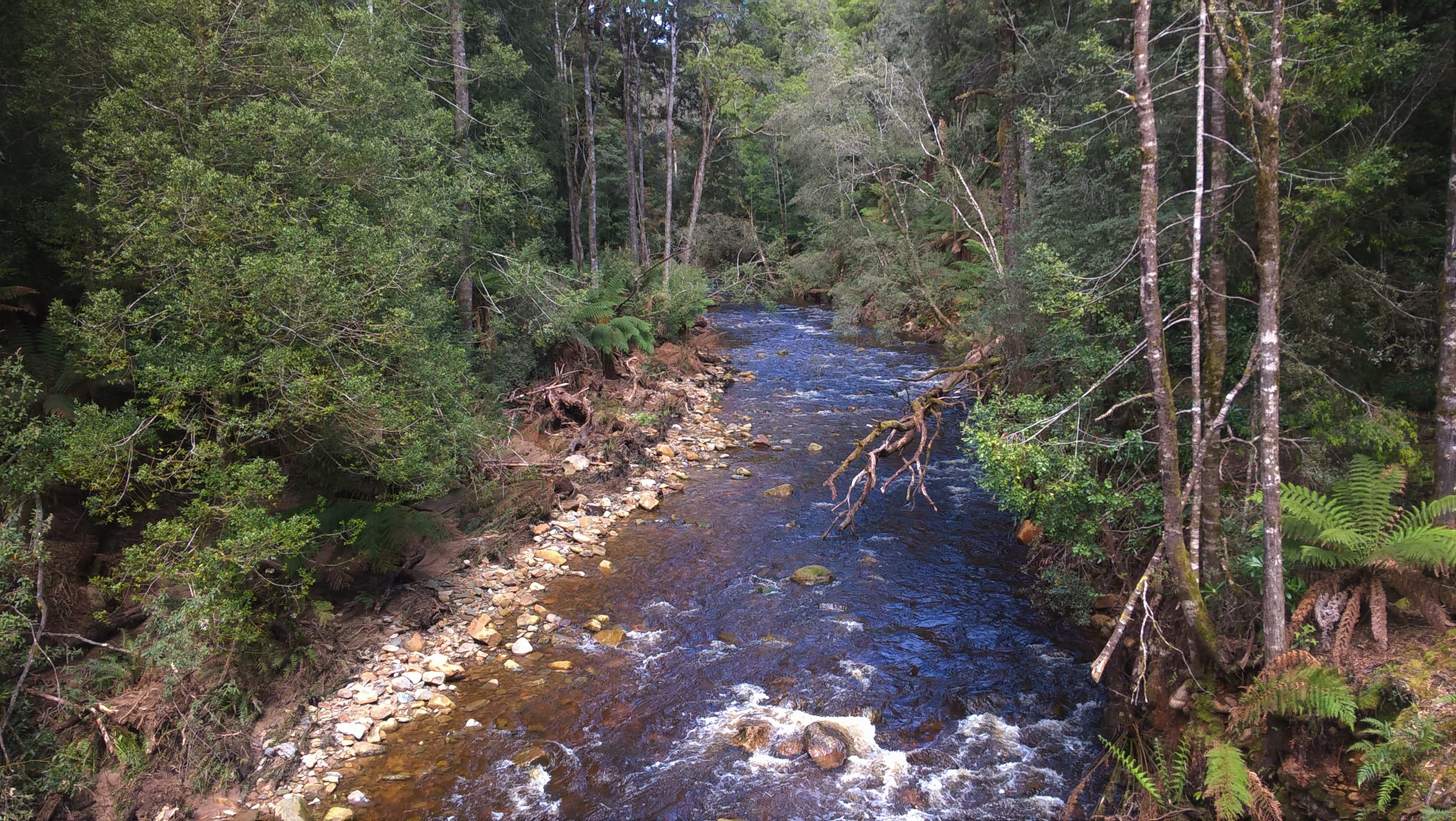
- The Flowerdale River at Meunna, North West Tasmania

- Location of the river mouth in Tasmania

Location
- Country: Australia
- State: Tasmania

Physical characteristics
- Source: Campbell Ranges
  - location: West Takone
  - coordinates: 41°10′36″S 145°34′27″E
  - elevation: 543 m (1,781 ft)
- Mouth: Inglis River
  - location: Wynyard
  - coordinates: 40°58′28″S 145°39′41″E
  - elevation: 16 m (52 ft)
- Length: 55 km (34 mi)
- Basin size: 157 km^{2} (61 sq mi)

Basin features
- Tributaries
  - left: Borradale Creek, Hebe River
  - right: Hardmans Creek

The Flowerdale River is a river in North West Tasmania, Australia. It extends approximately 55 kilometres (34 mi) from the Campbell Ranges near West Takone before discharging into the Inglis River at Wynyard. The Flowerdale is the largest tributary system on the Inglis River and makes up approximately one-third of the 471-square-kilometre (182 sq mi) Inglis-Flowerdale catchment basin.

== Inglis-Flowerdale catchment area ==
While not tributaries of the main river system, Sisters Creek and Seabrook Creek are notable minor creeks which form part of the 616 square kilometres (238 sq mi) Inglis-Flowerdale catchment area. Annual rainfall ranges from about 1,000 millimetres (39 in) at the coast to greater than 1,600 millimetres (63 in) in the upper reaches of the catchment, some 26 kilometres (16 mi) inland from Wynyard.

Forestry plantations dominate the landscape in the western region of the catchment, with intensive agriculture land-use in the north and eastern regions. Because of the steep and confining nature of the topography around the Inglis and Flowerdale rivers, both have retained substantial native forests that tend to buffer the rivers from both land-use activities.

== See also ==
- List of rivers of Australia § Tasmania
