= Inglis River =

River in Tasmania, Australia

Inglis
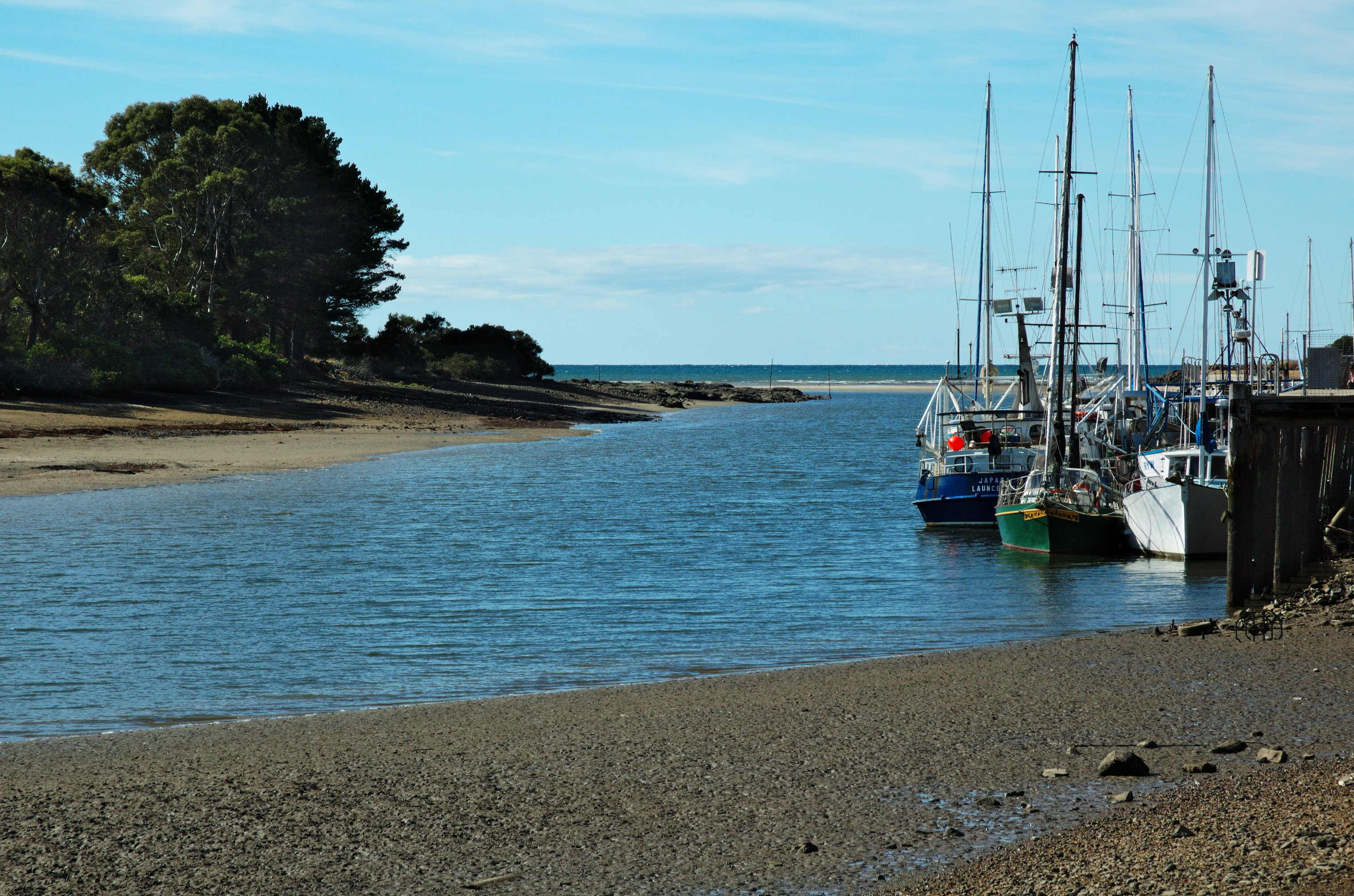
- Wharf at the mouth of the Inglis River in Wynyard

- Location of the river mouth in Tasmania

Location
- Country: Australia
- State: Tasmania

Physical characteristics
- Source: Campbell Ranges
  - location: Taken
  - elevation: 507 m (1,663 ft)
- Mouth: Bass Strait
  - location: Wynyard
  - coordinates: 40°59′14″S 145°44′13″E
  - elevation: 0 m (0 ft)
- Length: 61 km (38 mi)
- Basin size: 471 km^{2} (182 sq mi)

Basin features
- Tributaries
  - left: Rattler River, Jessie River, Flowerdale River
  - right: Calder River, Big Creek, Blackfish Creek

The Inglis River is a river in North West Tasmania, Australia. It extends approximately 61 kilometres (38 mi) from the Campbell Ranges near Takone before discharging into Bass Strait at Wynyard. The Flowerdale River is the largest tributary system on the Inglis River and makes up approximately one-third of the 471-square-kilometre (182 sq mi) Inglis-Flowerdale catchment basin.

== Inglis-Flowerdale catchment area ==
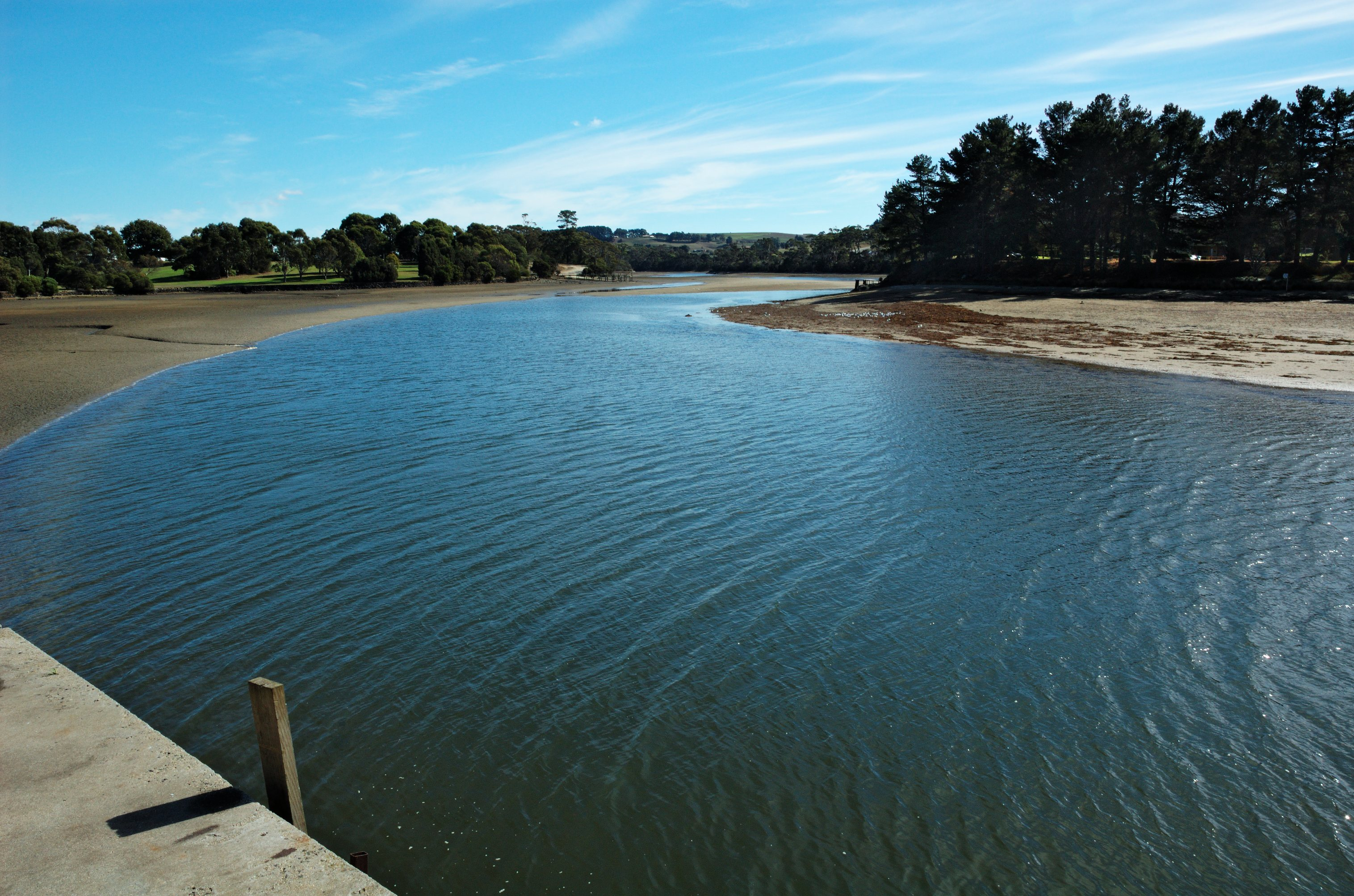
Inglis River estuary, looking upstream

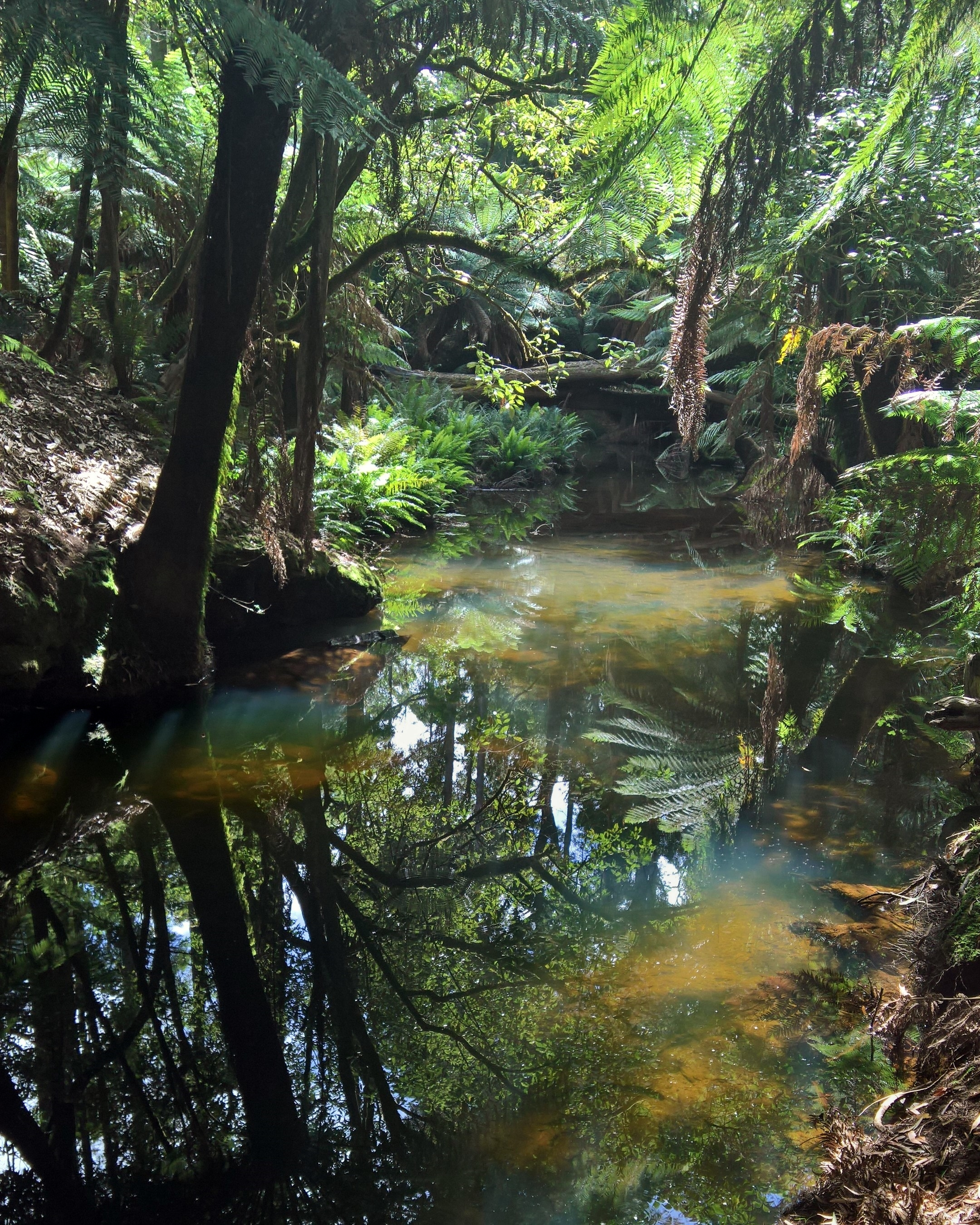
Stream pool of Camp Creek, a tributary of the Inglis River

While not tributaries of the main river system, Sisters Creek and Seabrook Creek are notable minor creeks which form part of the 616 square kilometres (238 sq mi) Inglis-Flowerdale catchment area. Annual rainfall ranges from about 1,000 millimetres (39 in) at the coast to greater than 1,600 millimetres (63 in) in the upper reaches of the catchment, some 26 kilometres (16 mi) inland from Wynyard.

Forestry plantations dominate the landscape in the western region of the catchment, with intensive agriculture land-use in the north and eastern regions. Because of the steep and confining nature of the topography around the Inglis and Flowerdale rivers, both have retained substantial native forests that tend to buffer the rivers from both land-use activities.

== Environment and wildlife ==
A 2003 water assessment report determined that the upper Inglis and Flowerdale Rivers and their tributaries are in generally good ecological health, however the middle and lower reaches of the Inglis River have less healthy macroinvertebrate communities. The poorer health of these communities suggest that they have been impacted by sedimentation from upstream forestry operations, gravel pits and poor stream-side agricultural land management practices. Measures to help mitigate further environment issues may include fencing off rivers to prevent livestock from accessing waterways and re-vegetation of river banks to prevent further erosion.

Beddomeia capensis is an endangered freshwater snail that had previously been surveyed at a tributary of Big Creek in 1989, but is now only known to occur on a few small streams upon Table Cape. Other aquatic threatened species in the Inglis-Flowerdale catchment includes the endangered giant freshwater crayfish, and the Australian grayling.

=== Willow removal ===
During 1999 and 2000, large scale willow infestation removal works were undertaken along the lower reaches of the Inglis River in the Flowerdale valley under the guidance of a federal government funding initiative. Poor remediation processes at the time, which involved removing the roots of the trees, has led to significant soil erosion and remains to be an issue for local agricultural landholders – more than a decade later.

== See also ==
- List of rivers of Australia § Tasmania
