= Surveyor General of Tasmania =

Surveyor General of Tasmania is a position originally created for the colony of Van Diemen's Land (Tasmania from 1855; now a state of Australia).

== List of Surveyors General of Tasmania ==
| Surveyor General | Period in office | Notes |
|---|---|---|
| George William Evans, | 1826 | Appointed, but did not assume office |
| Edward Dumaresq | 16 Dec. 1825 – 18 Mar. 1828 | Acting |
| George Frankland | 18 Mar. 1828 – 30 Dec. 1838 | Died in Office |
| Edward Boyd | 5 Jan. 1839 – 12 Nov. 1840 | |
| William Thomas Napier Champ | 12 Nov. 1840 - 1 Jul. 1841 | |
| Robert Power | 1 Jul. 1841 – 29 Jun. 1857 | |
| James Sprent | 29 Jun. 1857 – 7 Sep. 1859 | Acting until 19 Nov. 1857, then permanent, on leave from 27 Aug. 1858 |
| James Erskine Calder | 7 Sep. 1859 – 30 Jun. 1870 | Surveyor General position abolished 30 June 1870 |
| Henry Butler | 1870–1872 | Ministers for Lands and (Public) Works from July 1870 to 1894 |
| Charles Meredith | 1872–1873 | |
| William Moore | 1873–1876 | |
| Charles Meredith | 1876 | |
| Christopher O'Reilly | 1876–1877 | |
| William Moore | 1877 | |
| Nicholas John Brown | 1877–1878 | |
| Christopher O'Reilly | 1878–1882 | |
| Nicholas John Brown | 1882–1887 | |
| Sir Edward Nicholas Coventry Braddon | 1887–1888 | |
| Alfred Thomas Pillinger | 1888–1892 | |
| William Hartnoll | 1892–1894 | |
| Alfred Thomas Pillinger | 1894 | |
| Edward Albert Counsel, ISO | 1894–1924 | Surveyor General title resumed from 1894 |
| William Nevin Tatlow Hurst, ISO | 1925–1937 | Title: Secretary of Lands; Surveyor General title abolished again, see Land Surveyor's Act 1924. Five other positions in the department also abolished at this time, to economise. |
| Colin Mackenzie Pitt | 1938–1953 | |
| Edgar Derwent Blackwood | 1953-1955 | |
| Frank Miles | 1955-1970 | |
| Charles Christopher Butler | 1970–Jan 1986 | |
| Christopher M. Rowe | 1988–2002 | acting in January 1988, permanent by 1991 |
| Peter Murphy | 2002–2013 | |
| Michael Giudici | 2013–present | |

== See also ==
- Surveyor General of New South Wales
- Surveyor General of Queensland
- Surveyor General of South Australia
- Surveyor General of the Northern Territory
- Surveyor General of Victoria
- Surveyor General of Western Australia
