= Wynyard, Tasmania =

Wynyard
- Town
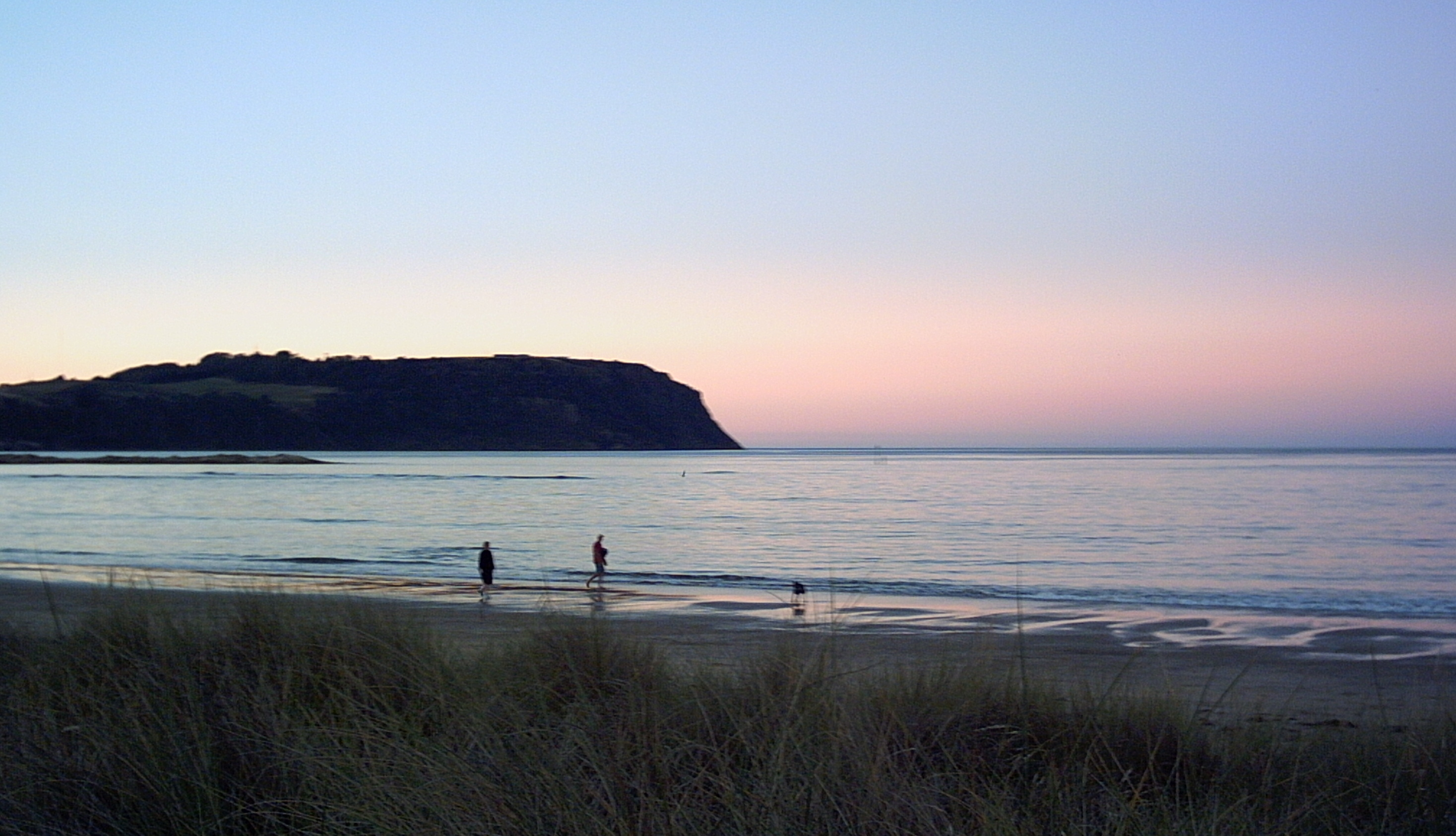
- Table Cape as seen at dusk

- Coordinates: 40°59′2″S 145°43′4″E
- Country: Australia
- State: Tasmania
- Region: North West Tasmania
- LGA: Waratah-Wynyard
- Location: 317 km (197 mi) NW of Hobart; 163 km (101 mi) NW of Launceston; 66 km (41 mi) NW of Devonport; 18 km (11 mi) NW of Burnie

Government
  - State electorate: Braddon
  - Federal division: Braddon
- Elevation: 12 m (39 ft)

Population
  - Total: 6,296 (2021 census)
- Postcode: 7325
- Mean max temp: 17.1 °C (62.8 °F)
- Mean min temp: 7.2 °C (45.0 °F)
- Annual rainfall: 987.8 mm (38.89 in)

Wynyard (/ˈwɪnjərd/) wi-nyuhd) is a rural town located on the North West coast of Tasmania, Australia. Wynyard is situated 17 kilometres (11 mi) west of Burnie. As of the 2021 census, Wynyard has an estimated population of 6,296. The town is a regional hub servicing the surrounding rural areas. The main council offices for the Waratah-Wynyard local government area are located in Wynyard.

The Burnie Wynyard Airport provides commercial flights to Melbourne and other districts.

== History ==
Three ex-convict Alexander brothers established a settlement, Alexandria, on the west, or Table Cape, side of the Inglis River in the 1850s. They bought large areas of farmland on Table Cape and built several small ships for produce and timber trading. Shortly afterwards, a town was laid on the east side of the river. Originally called Table Cape, it lagged well behind Alexandria which had a church and several shops including a blacksmith and general store. After the Inglis River was bridged in 1861, Alexandria began to fade and Wynyard, with better wharfing, became the district's centre of commerce.

Wynyard was probably renamed after Major-General Edward Buckley Wynyard in the early 1850s. Table Cape Post Office opened around 1856 and was renamed Wynyard in 1882.

Wynyard handled more shipping than Burnie in the late nineteenth century and its population reached 500 by 1900. However, in the 20th century Burnie flourished and become the dominant regional and industrial hub for the region.

== Demographics ==
=== Ancestry and immigration ===
As of the 2021 census, the most common ancestries were English 46.4%, Australian 45.1%, Scottish 9.6%, Irish 8.9% and Australian Aboriginal 8.7%.

=== Religion ===
Residents reported religious affiliation as: no religion 50%, Anglican 12.7%, Catholic 12.5%, not stated 7.2% and Uniting Church 5.1%.

== Community ==
=== Radio ===
Coast FM is a volunteer community radio station servicing the North-West coast of Tasmania, with the studio based in Wynyard.

=== Sports ===
The Wynyard Yacht Club was established in 1961 and is situated near the mouth of the Inglis River, the club has received national recognition for its inclusiveness programs.

The Wynyard Cricket Club was admitted to the NWTCA competition for the 1952/53 season. The club has produced some outstanding players, and many state representatives.

=== Wonders of Wynyard ===
The Wonders of Wynyard visitor information centre hosts a substantial classic vintage cars collection which was donated to the Waratah-Wynyard Council by the collector and restorer, Francis Ransley.

=== Coastal pathway ===
The development of a coastal pathway will connect Wynyard and Burnie to Latrobe as part of a state government and local government council initiative to upgrade infrastructure on the north-west coast of Tasmania.

=== Arts ===
A community art centre, Artscape, has been operated by a volunteer committee since 2007. The centre hosts community groups, exhibitions and provides a space in which the community can foster their own artistic events.

== Infrastructure ==
=== Education ===
There are currently two government funded public schools in Wynyard, Table Cape Primary School and Wynyard High School. There is also a Catholic primary school, St Brigid's, adjacent to the Catholic church of the same name.

Previously, Wynyard Primary School (located at Gibbons Street) and Inglis Primary School (located at Bowick Street) existed separately. Both were renamed to Table Cape Primary School in 1998. The two school campuses were then merged in 2009, with the closing of the Bowick Street campus.

== Geographical features ==
=== Freestone Cove ===
Freestone Cove is a small sheltered bay on the northern fringes of Wynyard, towards Table Cape.

==== Fossil Bluff ====
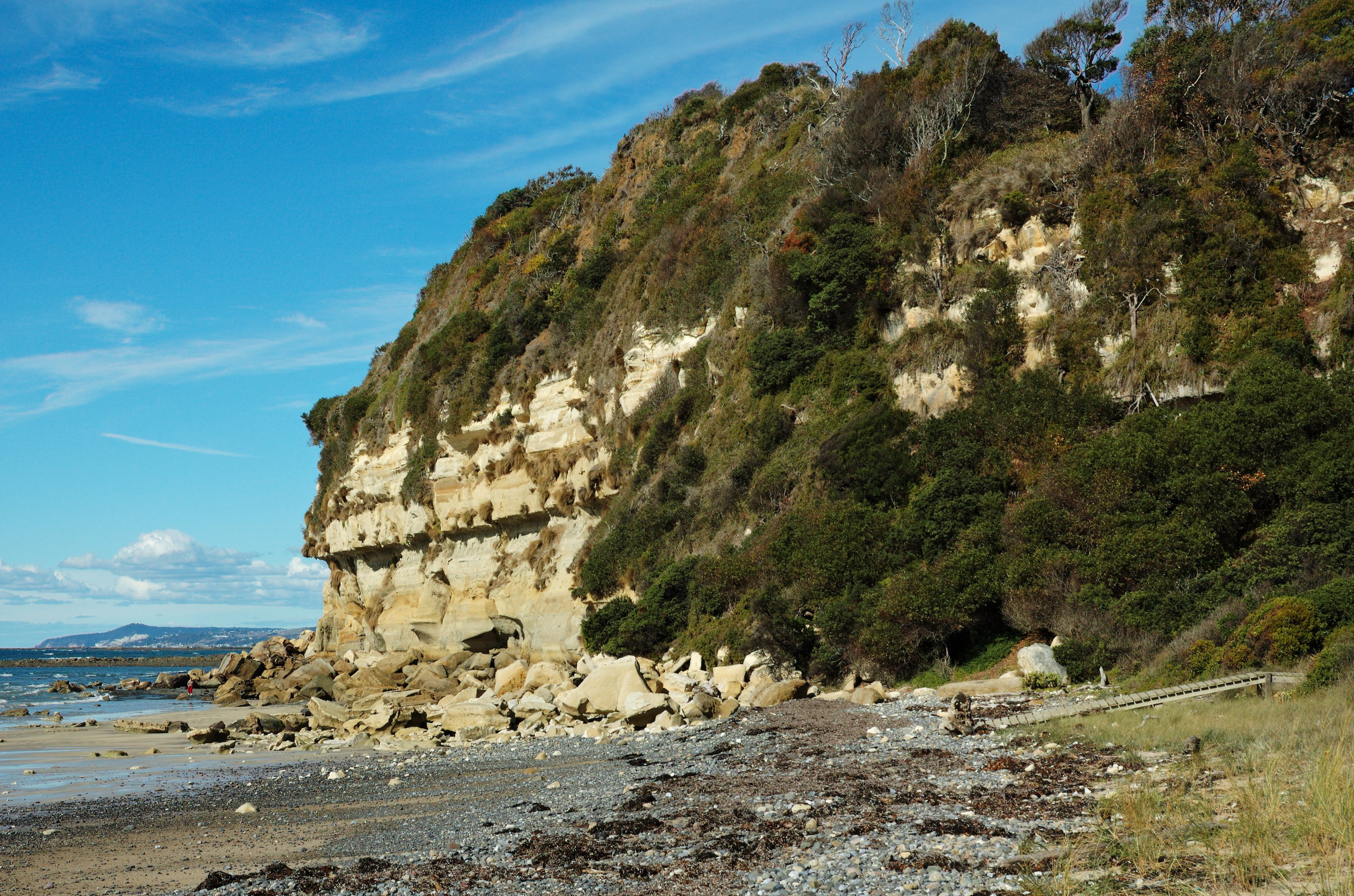
Fossil Bluff sandstone cliffs

Fossil bluff is a small protrusion of sandstone cliffs rising about 30 metres (98 ft) from the coastline at Freestone Cove. In the 19th century, it was the discovery site of Australia's oldest fossil marsupial, Wynyardia bassiana, an extinct possum-like animal from the early Miocene (about 25 million years ago). Also recovered was an extinct genus of whale, Prosqualodon.

==== Aboriginal fish traps ====
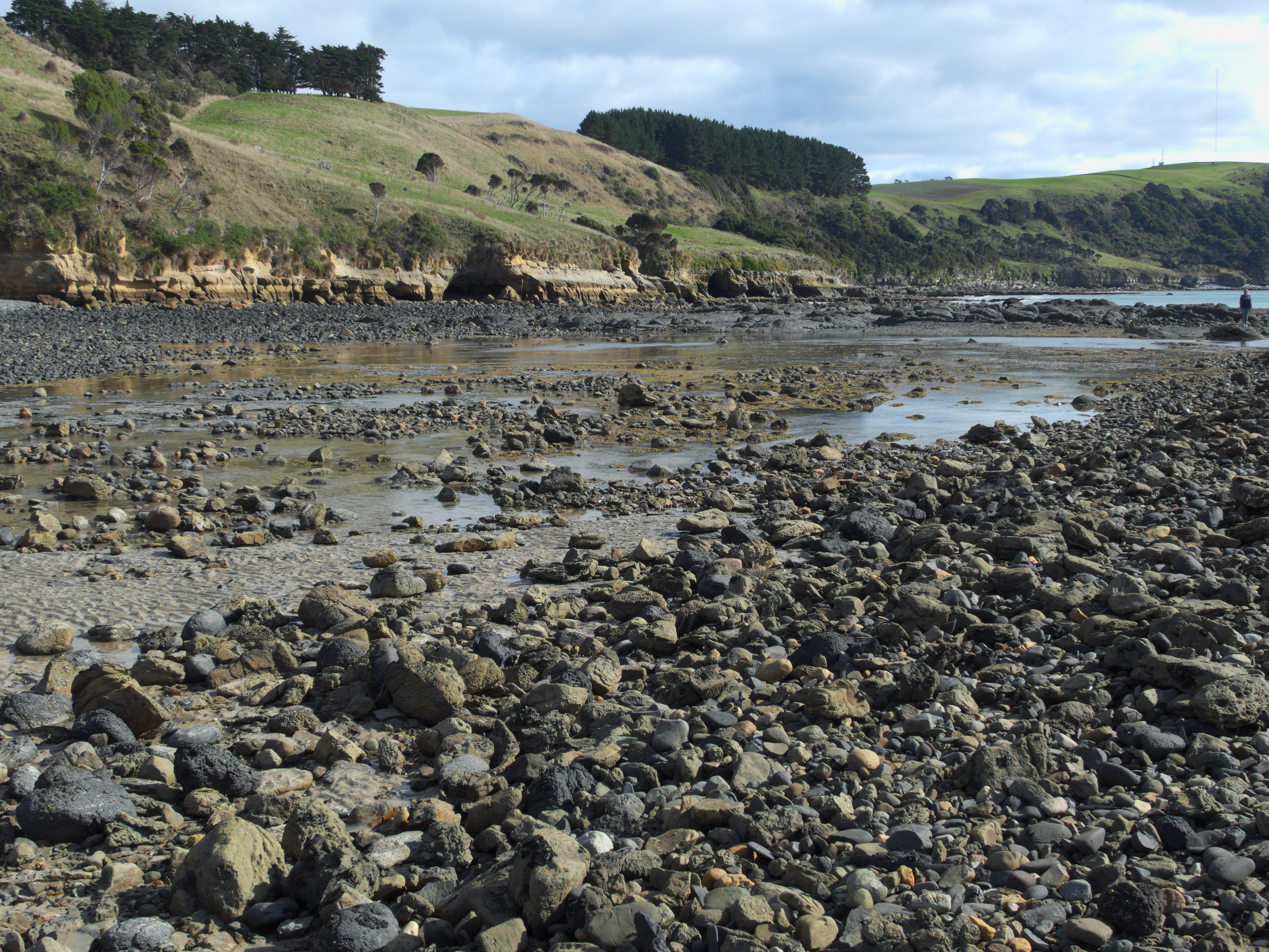
Tidal fish traps at Freestone Cove

It is believed the Aboriginal Tommeginer clan built tidal fish traps with rocks at Freestone Cove, the rocks are still evident today and are protected under the Aboriginal Relics Act. The Tommeginer tribe lived in the region along the coastline around Wynyard and Table Cape until soon after the arrival of Europeans in the 19th century.

A considerable number of tidal fish traps have been found in the north and north-west of the state. This phenomenon is attributed to the mean tidal range of two metres along this stretch of coastline, which is ideal for this type of construction. Whilst some of these traps were certainly built by Europeans, there is good reason to believe others were of Aboriginal construction, such as at Freestone Cove. Three other traps located at nearby Rocky Cape, Sisters Beach and Boat Harbour do not have established European origins, furthermore, all are located within the territory which was occupied by the Tommeginer tribe.

Tidal fish traps must be located close to settlements or camps so that they can be monitored. Because as the tide ebbs, any fish caught in the shallows fall easy prey to scavenging seabirds. The Freestone Cove traps are located a considerable distance from the nearest early European settlement of Alexandria, but were close to known Aboriginal campsites and several middens have been located along the shoreline nearby.

=== Inglis River ===
Wynyard is located around the mouth of the Inglis River, which extends approximately 61 kilometres to the Campbell Ranges near Takone.

=== Table Cape ===
Table Cape is a volcanic plug located about 4 kilometres (2.5 mi) north of Wynyard, the northern and eastern faces of the geological feature rise steeply from Bass Strait to a height of approximately 170 metres (560 ft) above sea level. The area is renowned for the annual flowering of tulips during spring and accompanying tulip festival. Situated on the edge of Table Cape is the heritage-listed Table Cape Lighthouse, which remains in operation today. The lighthouse stands about 25 metres (82 ft) tall and has a maximum range of 16 nautical miles (30 km; 18 mi).

== Climate ==
Wynyard has an oceanic climate (Köppen: Cfb), with very mild, relatively dry summers and cool, rainy winters. Average maxima vary from 21.8 °C (71.2 °F) in January and February to 12.8 °C (55.0 °F) in July while average minima fluctuate between 11.6 °C (52.9 °F) in February and 3.6 °C (38.5 °F) in July. Mean average annual precipitation is moderate: 987.8 mm (38.89 in), but is frequent: spread between 179.5 precipitation days. The town is not very sunny, with 147.6 cloudy days and only 45.9 clear days per annum. Extreme temperatures have ranged from 35.1 °C (95.2 °F) on 31 January 2009 to −4.0 °C (24.8 °F) on 6 July 2024. Sunshine data was sourced from Elliott, a rural locality 10.2 kilometres (6.3 mi) southeast of Wynyard.

Climate data for Wynyard (41º00'00"S, 145º43'48"E, 12 m AMSL) (1947-2024 normals & extremes, sun 1965-1993)
Month	Jan	Feb	Mar	Apr	May	Jun	Jul	Aug	Sep	Oct	Nov	Dec	Year
Record high °C (°F)	35.1 (95.2)	32.6 (90.7)	31.0 (87.8)	27.2 (81.0)	21.0 (69.8)	19.7 (67.5)	17.9 (64.2)	19.3 (66.7)	21.4 (70.5)	25.2 (77.4)	30.5 (86.9)	31.1 (88.0)	35.1 (95.2)
Mean daily maximum °C (°F)	21.8 (71.2)	21.8 (71.2)	20.3 (68.5)	17.7 (63.9)	15.2 (59.4)	13.5 (56.3)	12.8 (55.0)	13.4 (56.1)	14.5 (58.1)	16.3 (61.3)	18.1 (64.6)	19.9 (67.8)	17.1 (62.8)
Mean daily minimum °C (°F)	11.4 (52.5)	11.6 (52.9)	9.8 (49.6)	7.2 (45.0)	5.3 (41.5)	4.1 (39.4)	3.6 (38.5)	4.1 (39.4)	5.0 (41.0)	6.3 (43.3)	8.3 (46.9)	9.8 (49.6)	7.2 (45.0)
Record low °C (°F)	0.6 (33.1)	1.1 (34.0)	−0.2 (31.6)	−2.3 (27.9)	−2.7 (27.1)	−3.6 (25.5)	−4.0 (24.8)	−3.1 (26.4)	−2.5 (27.5)	−1.6 (29.1)	−0.6 (30.9)	0.0 (32.0)	−4.0 (24.8)
Average precipitation mm (inches)	44.2 (1.74)	46.8 (1.84)	49.8 (1.96)	69.6 (2.74)	94.6 (3.72)	107.7 (4.24)	129.5 (5.10)	117.2 (4.61)	93.5 (3.68)	94.2 (3.71)	73.1 (2.88)	64.0 (2.52)	987.8 (38.89)
Average precipitation days (≥ 0.2 mm)	8.9	8.7	11.0	13.3	17.2	18.2	20.8	20.9	18.1	16.7	13.6	12.1	179.5
Average afternoon relative humidity (%)	59	60	61	66	70	73	73	70	68	64	63	61	66
Average dew point °C (°F)	10.8 (51.4)	11.5 (52.7)	10.3 (50.5)	9.2 (48.6)	8.1 (46.6)	7.1 (44.8)	6.2 (43.2)	6.2 (43.2)	6.4 (43.5)	7.0 (44.6)	8.3 (46.9)	9.7 (49.5)	8.4 (47.1)
Mean monthly sunshine hours	254.2	217.5	192.2	159.0	127.1	120.0	127.1	139.5	159.0	210.8	219.0	232.5	2,157.9
Percentage possible sunshine	57	56	50	48	42	43	43	43	45	52	51	50	48
Source: Bureau of Meteorology (1947-2024 normals & extremes, sun 1965-1993)

== Notable residents ==
- F. M. Alexander the creator of the Alexander technique was born on the northern bank of the Inglis River at a settlement called Alexandria, situated about three km upstream from the river mouth. He later moved to Waratah, Melbourne, London and New York to pursue acting and teaching.
- Carla Boyd is a retired Australian women's basketball player who was born in Wynyard. Boyd Competed at the 1996 and 2000 Olympic Games, and the 1998 World Championship, winning medals at all three events (1 silver and 2 bronze).

== Gallery ==
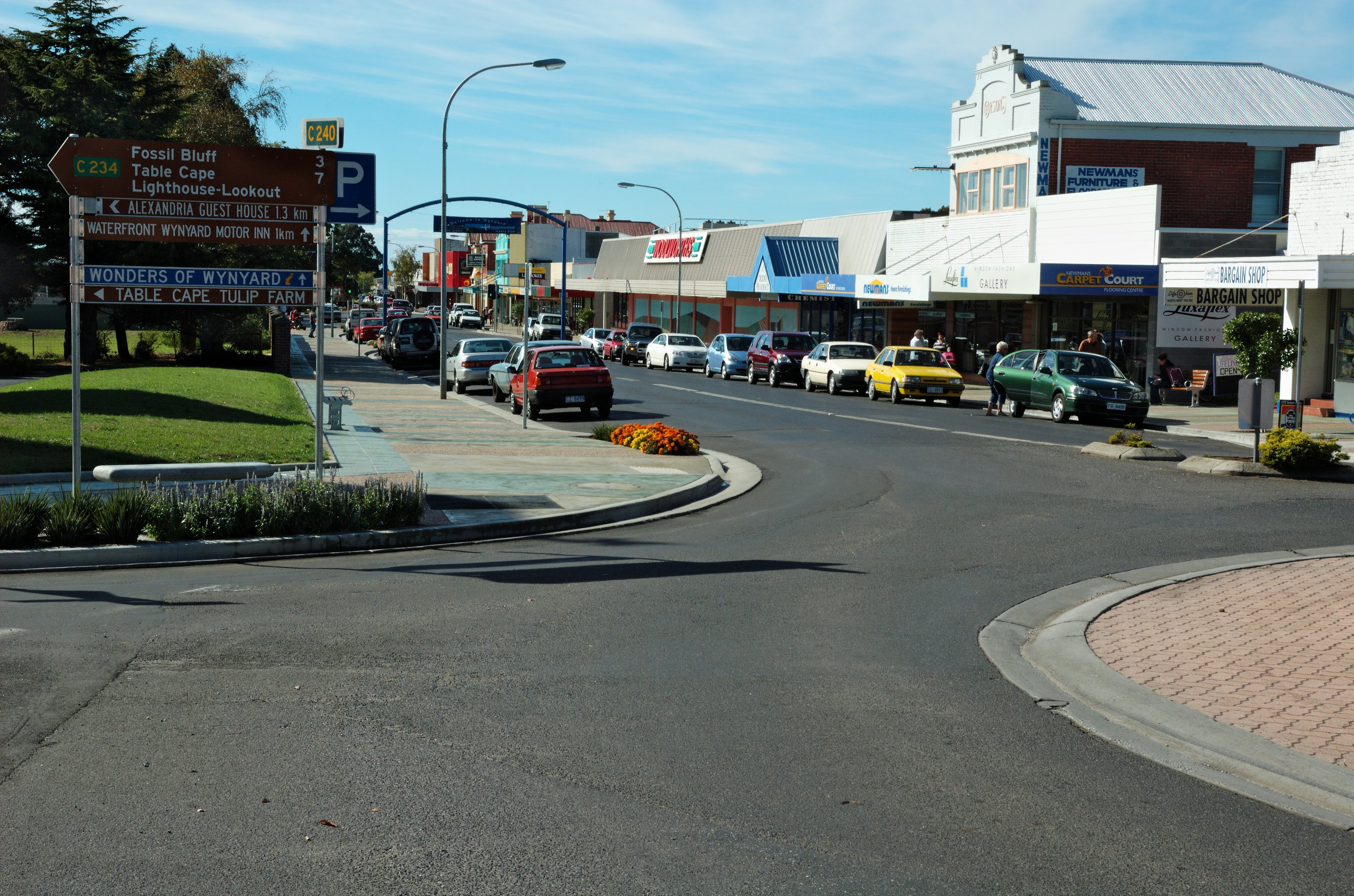
Goldie Street

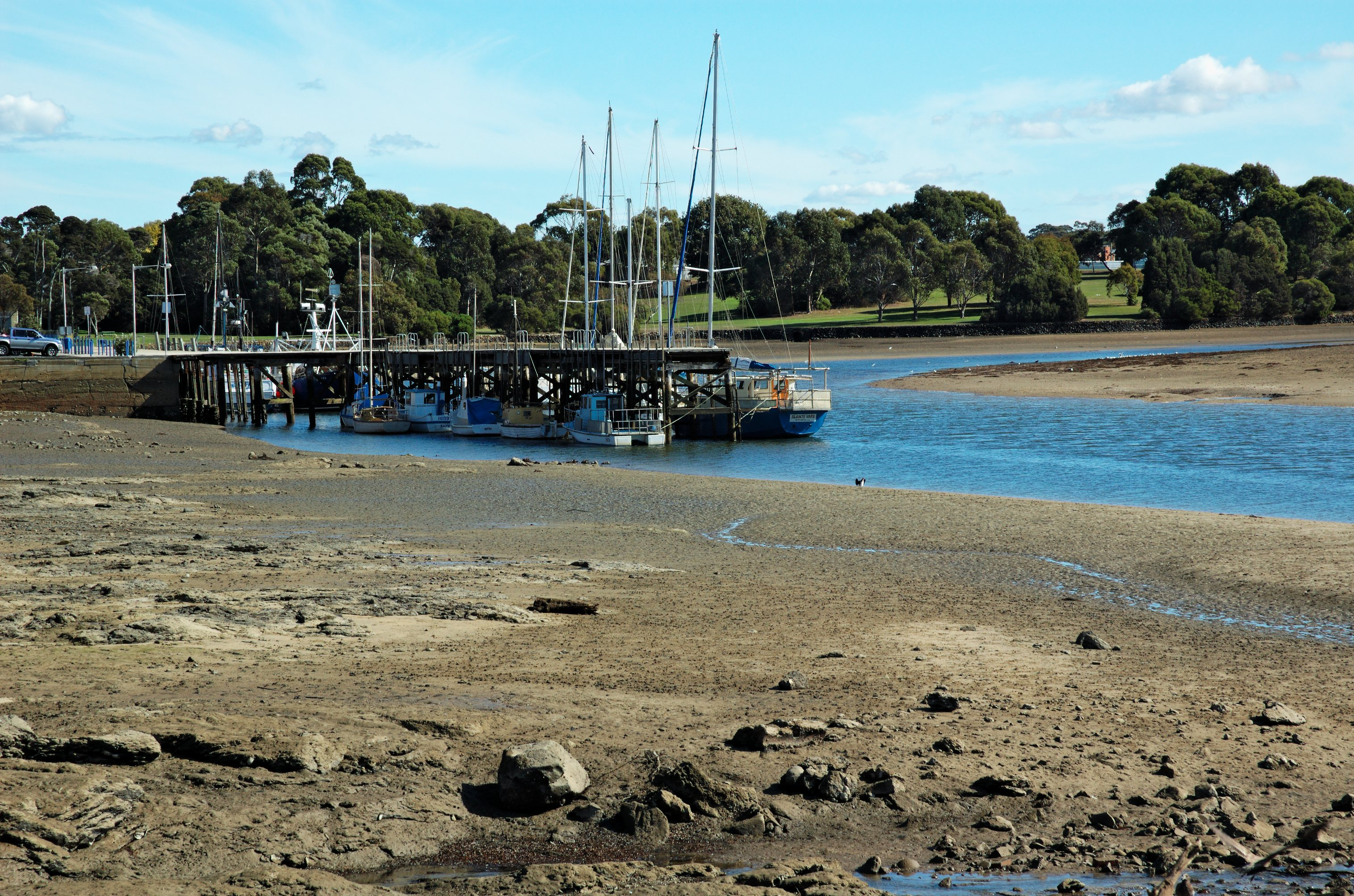
Wharf on the Inglis River at low tide

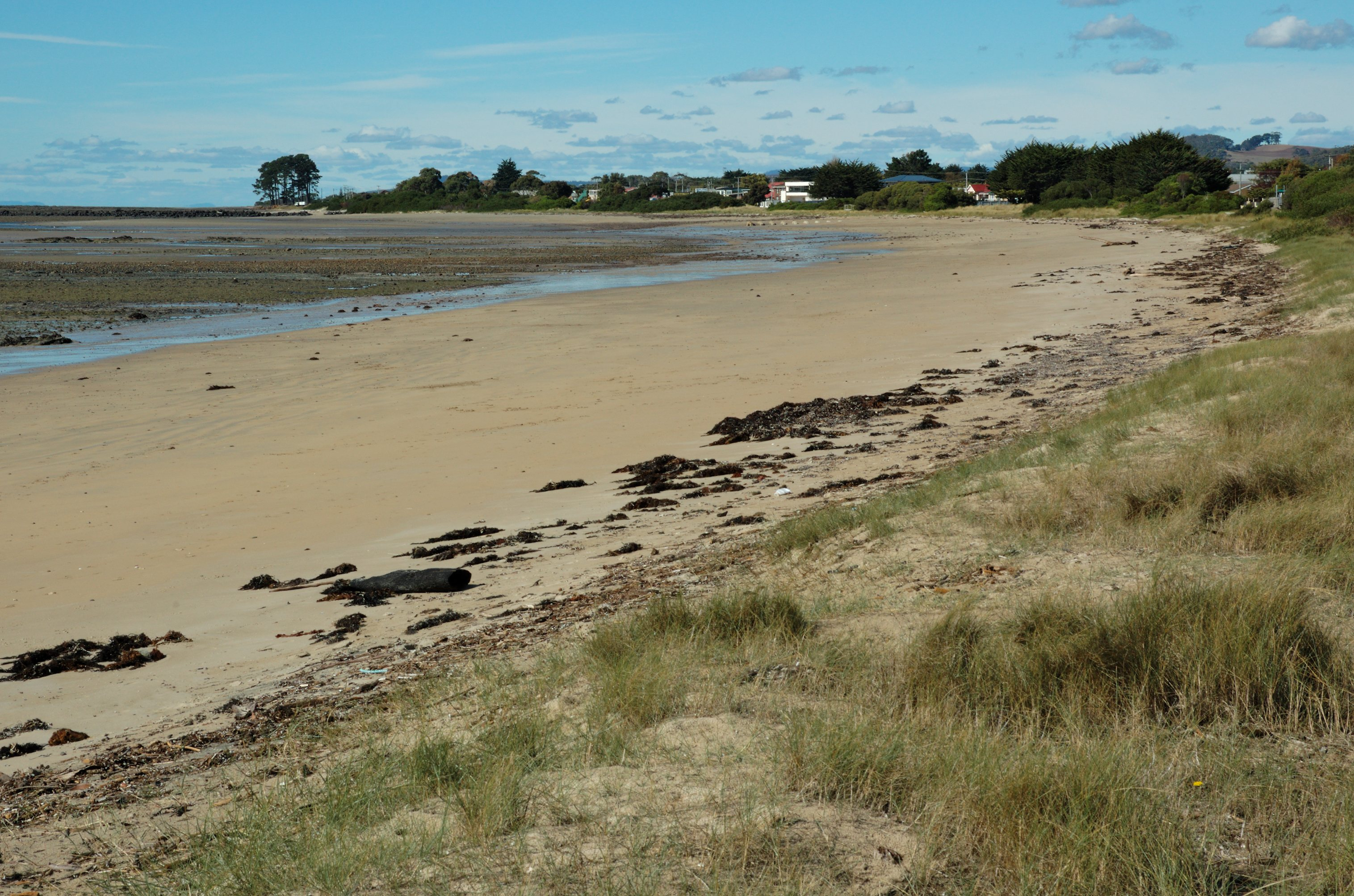
East Wynyard Beach
