= Havenview, Tasmania =

Havenview
- Suburb
- Interactive map of Havenview
- Coordinates: 41°05′13″S 145°54′40″E
- Country: Australia
- State: Tasmania
- Region: North-west and west
- City: Burnie
- LGA: Burnie
- Location: 5 km (3.1 mi) S of Burnie

Government
  - State electorate: Braddon
  - Federal division: Braddon

Population
  - Total: 735 (2021 census)
- Postcode: 7320
Suburbs around Havenview
Brooklyn	South Burnie	Emu Heights
Romaine	Havenview	Stowport
Romaine	Romaine	Stowport

Havenview is a rural residential locality in the of Burnie, Tasmania Australia. The locality is about 5 kilometres (3.1 mi) south of Burnie. As at the 2021 census it had a population of 735.

== History ==
Havenview was gazetted as a locality in 1966.

== Geography ==
The Emu River forms much of the eastern boundary.

== Road infrastructure ==
Route C112 (Old Surrey Road) runs through from north-east to south-west.
