= Upper Burnie =

- Suburb
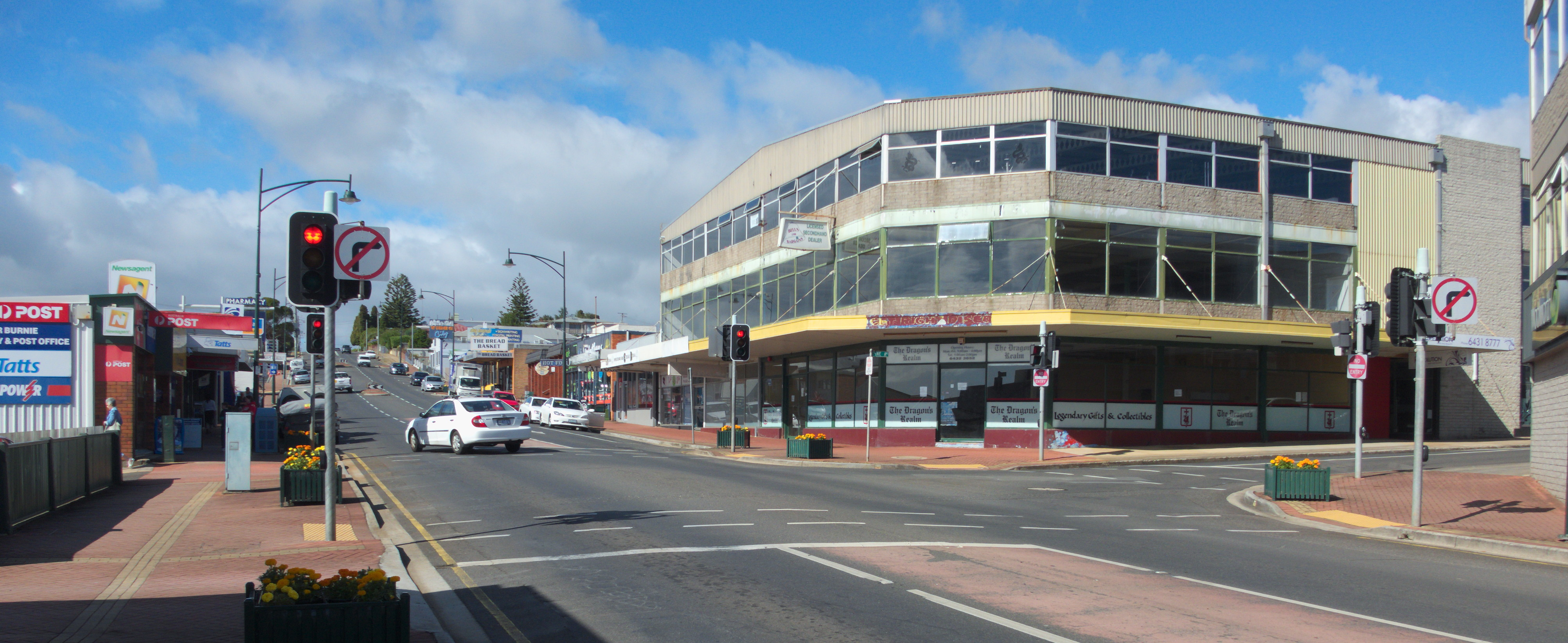
- Mount Street at the intersection with Pine Avenue

- Interactive map of Upper Burnie
- Coordinates: 41.071°S 145.900°E
- Country: Australia
- State: Tasmania
- Region: North-west and west
- City: Burnie
- LGA: City of Burnie
- Location: 3 km (1.9 mi) S of Burnie

Government
  - State electorate: Braddon
  - Federal division: Braddon

Population
  - Total: 1,891 (2021 census)
- Postcode: 7320
Suburbs around Upper Burnie
Hillcrest	Burnie	South Burnie
Acton	Upper Burnie	Brooklyn
Shorewell Park	Downlands	Romaine

Upper Burnie is a residential locality in the local government area (LGA) of Burnie in Tasmania, Australia. The locality is about 3 kilometres (1.9 mi) south of the town of Burnie. As at the 2021 census it a population of 1,891.

== History ==
Upper Burnie was gazetted as a locality in 1966.

== Geography ==
Alexander Creek forms part of the eastern boundary.

== Road infrastructure ==
Route B18 (Mount Street) runs through from north-west to south-east.

== Education ==
Upper Burnie Primary School existed up until 2009 until it was merged with Acton and Brooklyn Primary Schools and a new school was built on the grounds of the Parklands High School.

== Sports ==
The Burnie Sports Centre hosts:

- Basketball
- Badminton
- Mixed martial arts
- Rugby – Burnie Rugby Union Club
