= Round Hill, Tasmania =

Round Hill
- Town
- Coordinates: 41°04′16″S 145°56′58″E
- Country: Australia
- State: Tasmania
- Region: North-west and west
- LGA: Burnie
- Location: 6 km (3.7 mi) SE of Burnie

Government
  - State electorate: Braddon
  - Federal division: Braddon

Population
  - Total: 109 (2016 census)
- Postcode: 7320
Localities around Round Hill
Bass Strait	Bass Strait	Bass Strait
Wivenhoe	Round Hill	Chasm Creek
Stowport	Stowport	Heybridge

Round Hill is a rural residential locality in the local government area (LGA) of Burnie in the North-west and west LGA region of Tasmania. The locality is about 6 kilometres (3.7 mi) south-east of the town of Burnie. The 2016 census recorded a population of 109 for the state suburb of Round Hill.

== History ==
Round Hill was gazetted as a locality in 1974.

It is believed that the hill (Round Hill) in the locality was named by George Bass in 1798, during his circumnavigation of Van Diemen's Land with Matthew Flinders.

== Geography ==
The waters of Bass Strait form the northern boundary. The Western Railway Line passes through from north-east to north-west.

== Road infrastructure ==
National Route 1 (Bass Highway) runs through from north-east to north-west.
