= Romaine, Tasmania =

Romaine
- Suburb
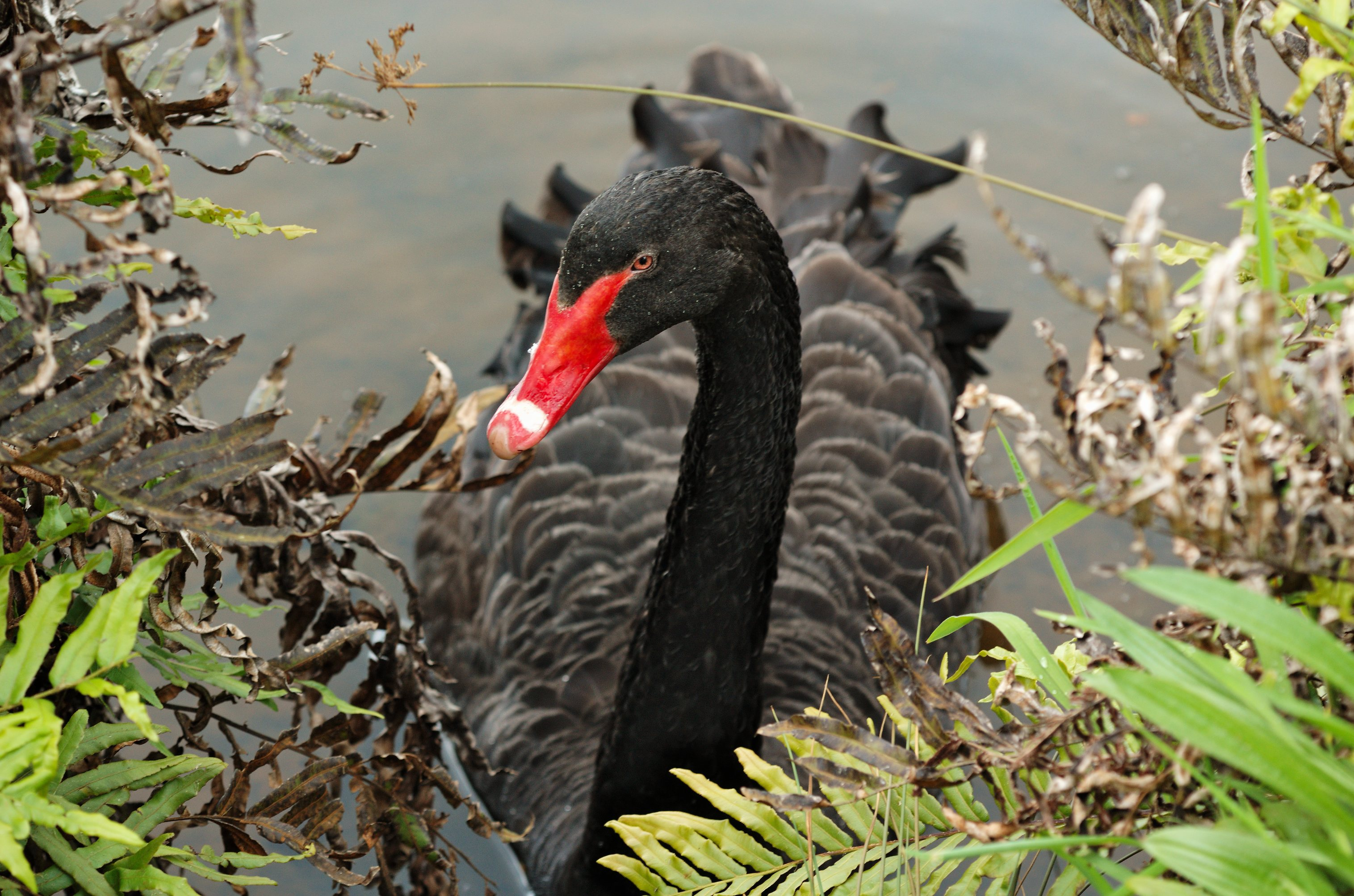
- A Black swan in Romaine Reservoir

- Interactive map of Romaine
- Coordinates: 41.07658°S 145.90213°E
- Country: Australia
- State: Tasmania
- City: Burnie
- LGA: City of Burnie

Government
  - Federal division: Braddon

Population
  - Total: 1,850 (SAL 2021)
- Postcode: 7320
Suburbs around Romaine
Acton	Brooklyn	Emu Heights
Mooreville	Romaine	Havenview
Mooreville	Stowport	Stowport

Romaine is a suburb of the City of Burnie in north-west Tasmania, Australia.

The Romaine Reserve is 12.69ha of park lands that runs down the eastern side of the suburb, along Romaine Creek. The Reserve contains both remnant and exotic vegetation, with large mountain ashes, white gums, substorey blackwoods and man ferns. The walking tracks link up with Brooklyn Reserve. Romaine Creek is home to Engaeus yabbimunna a freshwater crayfish.

The Emu Valley Rhododendron Garden was created in 1981 and is now a tourist attraction.

== Education ==
The Romaine Primary School was opened in 2012, it was announced in 2009 that its creation was from the merger of Acton Primary School, Upper Burnie and Brooklyn Primary Schools and that the new school was built on the grounds of the Parklands High School.

Parklands High School was relocated from Parklands to Romaine in 1966.

== Churches ==
- Romaine Park Christian Centre
- Recharge Church

== Sports ==
Romaine competes in the Burnie Netball Association.

In 1906 the Romaine Football Club was created by the renaming the Emu Bay Football Club. Three years later in 1909 it was renamed the Burnie Football Club. The Burnie Dockers Football Club is the current name of the football club.
