= Brooklyn, Tasmania =

Brooklyn
- Suburb
- Interactive map of Brooklyn
- Coordinates: 41°04′19″S 145°54′32″E
- Country: Australia
- State: Tasmania
- Region: North-west and west
- City: Burnie
- LGA: City of Burnie
- Location: 3 km (1.9 mi) S of Burnie

Government
  - State electorate: Braddon
  - Federal division: Braddon

Population
  - Total: 1,850 (2021 census)
- Postcode: 7320
Suburbs around Brooklyn
Upper Burnie	South Burnie	South Burnie
Upper Burnie	Brooklyn	South Burnie
Upper Burnie	Romaine	Emu Heights

Brooklyn is a residential locality in Burnie, Tasmania, Australia. The locality is about 3 kilometres (2 mi) south of Burnie. As at the 2021 census it a population of 1,850.

== History ==
Brooklyn was named after Brooklyn Estate, a 60 acre farm south of Devon Street, South Burnie. This estate was subdivided into housing lots in the early 1940s, with road construction starting in 1939. The Advocate described Brooklyn in the 1940s as a "flourishing suburb" and the "Toorak of progressive Burnie".

Brooklyn was gazetted as a locality in 1965.

The Brookville Post Office on Collins Street, named to avoid duplication of post office names, opened on 1 August 1953 and was renamed "Brooklyn" in 1968. It closed in 1973.

== Geography ==
Alexander Creek forms much of the western boundary, and Romaine Creek most of the eastern and northern.

== Road infrastructure ==
Route B18 (Mount Street) passes to the west. From there, Roslyn Avenue provides access to the locality from the south, while Brooklyn Road enters from the north.

== Education ==
Brooklyn Primary School existed until 2009. It was later merged with Upper Burnie and Acton Primary School and a new school, Romaine Park Primary was built on the grounds of the Parklands High School. The old Acton Primary School is now home to the Burnie Child and Family Centre.
