= Acton, Tasmania =

Acton
- Suburb
- Interactive map of Acton
- Coordinates: 41°04′12″S 145°53′38″E
- Country: Australia
- State: Tasmania
- Region: North-west and west
- City: Burnie
- LGA: City of Burnie
- Location: 3 km (1.9 mi) S of Burnie

Government
  - State electorate: Braddon
  - Federal division: Braddon

Population
  - Total: 1,377 (2021 census)
- Postcode: 7320
Suburbs around Acton
Shorewell Park	Hillcrest	Upper Burnie
Shorewell Park	Acton	Upper Burnie
Moorville	Downlands	Romaine

Acton is a residential locality in Tasmania, about 3 kilometres (1.9 mi) south of the town of Burnie.As at the 2021 census it a population of 1,377.

There is a local milk bar, an IGA supermarket, and an Aurora Energy electrical substation.

There is an 11.7-hectare (29-acre) reserve at Mussen Close with walking tracks; Stoney Creek commences nearby.

Acton Seniors Club operates in Atkins Drive.

== History ==
Acton was gazetted as a locality in 1966.

== Geography ==
Shorewell Creek forms much of the western boundary.

== Road infrastructure ==
Route B18 (Mount Street) passes to the east. From there, several streets provide access to the locality.

== Education ==
Acton Primary School existed up until 2009, when it was merged with Upper Burnie and Brooklyn Primary Schools and a new school was built on the grounds of the Parklands High School. The old Acton Primary School is now home to the Burnie Child and Family Centre.

== Sports ==
There are two fields at the Acton Recreation Reserve.

The Acton Cricket Club, in the Burnie Cricket League, play cricket on the Acton Recreation Oval, which has an area of 2.4 hectares (5.9 acres).

The Burnie Softball Association is located at the Acton Recreation Reserve, which has an area of 3.0 hectares (7.4 acres).
