= Wivenhoe, Tasmania =

Wivenhoe
- Suburb
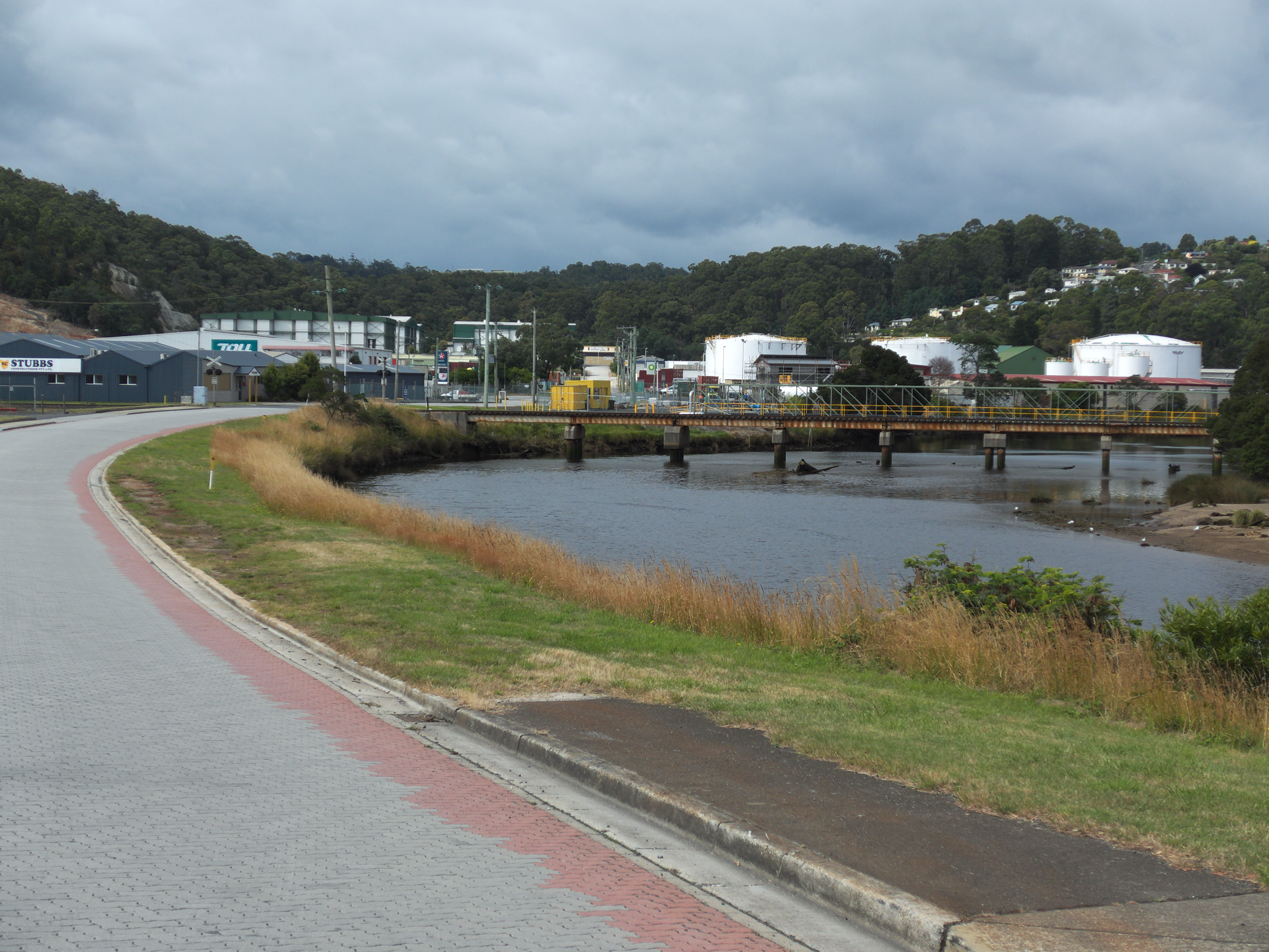
- The Emu River in Wivenhoe

- Interactive map of Wivenhoe
- Coordinates: 41°04′16″S 145°55′51″E
- Country: Australia
- State: Tasmania
- Region: North West Tasmania
- City: Burnie
- LGA: City of Burnie
- Location: 3 km (1.9 mi) SE of Burnie

Government
  - State electorate: Braddon
  - Federal division: Braddon

Population
  - Total: 235 (2021)
- Postcode: 7320
Suburbs around Wivenhoe
South Burnie	Bass Strait	Bass Strait
Brooklyn	Wivenhoe	Round Hill
Emu Heights	Stowport	Stowport

Wivenhoe is a suburb of Burnie, Tasmania, Australia. It is located about 3 kilometres (2 mi) south-east of the town of Burnie. The northern boundary is formed by Bass Strait, and the western by the Emu River. As at the 2021 census it a population of 235.

== History ==
Wivenhoe is believed to be named after Wivenhoe in England.

== Road infrastructure ==
The Bass Highway passes east–west along the shore of the Bass Strait. The C102 route (Stowport Road) terminates at the Bass Highway in Wivenhoe. It runs south-west through to Stowport, and from there provides access to several other localities and the Murchison Highway.
