= Emu Heights =

Emu Heights may refer to:

- Emu Heights, New South Wales
- Emu Heights, Tasmania
