= Montello, Tasmania =

Montello
- Suburb
- Interactive map of Montello
- Coordinates: 41.057°S 145.896°E
- Country: Australia
- State: Tasmania
- Region: North-west and west
- City: Burnie
- LGA: City of Burnie
- Location: 2 km (1.2 mi) SW of Burnie

Government
  - State electorate: Braddon
  - Federal division: Braddon

Population
  - Total: 1,217 (2016 census)
- Postcode: 7320
Suburbs around Montello
Park Grove	Park Grove	Burnie
Park Grove	Montello	Burnie
Hillcrest	Hillcrest	Hillcrest

Montello is a suburb of the city of Burnie in North West Tasmania. It is about 2 kilometres (1.2 mi) south-west of the centre of Burnie, and recorded a population of 1217 in the 2016 census.

== History ==
Montello is located on a hill near central Burnie, with the name assigned around 1903. The highest point in Montello is about 130 metres above sea level, near the intersection of Tattersall and Jorgensen streets.

In the early 20th century, the Emu Bay Racing Club held horse racing events at a course in Montello. In September 1917, it was reported that the club had given up the lease of the course.

The main road through Montello, View Road, was renamed from Old Mooreville Road in 1924, to avoid confusion with the new Mooreville Road. Elizabeth Street was renamed from Edward Street in 1942, to avoid confusion with Edwardes Street in South Burnie. The new name was suggested by Mr E. Tracey, the son of the original owner of the land.

The first section of the Garner's Estate subdivision of government housing was approved in January 1945, with the Agricultural Bank involved. Jorgensen, Morse, Oates and Truganini streets were named on the plans. Plans for the subdivision by Van Diemen's Land Company were issued in 1949.

Montello Primary School opened on 4 November 1952, initially as a junior school with classes from kindergarten to Grade 2.

Montello was gazetted as a locality in 1966.

The Jorgenson Street Reserve takes its name from Jørgen Jørgensen who worked for the Van Diemen's Land Company in the 1820s.

== Geography ==
Most of the boundaries are survey lines.

== Road infrastructure ==
Route A2 (Bass Highway) passes to the north-east. From there, Mount Street or West Park Grove can be used to reach View Road.

== Education ==
- Montello Primary School

== Sport ==
Burnie United Football Club is a soccer club that competes in the Northern Premier League and its home base is the Montello Soccer and Recreation Reserve which is 5.01 hectares (12.4 acres) in size.

Montello has a side in the Burnie Netball Association roster.
