= City of Burnie =

Burnie City Council
- Local government area
- Interactive map of Burnie City Council
- Coordinates: 41.2156°S 145.8065°E
- Country: Australia
- State: Tasmania
- Region: Burnie and surrounds
- Established: 6 January 1908
- Council seat: Burnie

Government
  - Mayor: Teeny Brumby
  - State electorate: Braddon
  - Federal division: Braddon

Area
  - Total: 611 km^{2} (236 sq mi)

Population
  - Total: 19,348 (2018)
  - Density: 31.666/km^{2} (82.01/sq mi)
- Website: Burnie City Council
LGAs around Burnie City Council
| Bass Strait | Bass Strait | Bass Strait |
| Waratah-Wynyard | Burnie City Council | Central Coast |
| Waratah-Wynyard | Waratah-Wynyard | Central Coast |

Burnie City Council (or City of Burnie) is a local government body in Tasmania, located in the city and surrounds of Burnie in the north-west of the state. The Burnie local government area is classified as urban and has a population of 19,348, which also encompasses Cooee, Hampshire, Natone and Ridgley.

== History and attributes ==
The municipality was established on 6 January 1908. Originally named Emu Bay, the name was changed to Burnie in 1931 following a petition from residents to name the council based on the town it was centred on. Burnie became a city council on 26 April 1988.

The city's motto is "non nobis solum" (not for ourselves alone); for many years this was on the council seal but in 1992 a new, more colourful logo was created that did not include the motto. It did also not include the emu (which had been Burnie's unofficial animal emblem). Burnie's floral emblem is the rhododendron.

Burnie is classified as urban, regional and small (URS) under the Australian Classification of Local Governments. Burnie does not include the adjacent town of Somerset that is sometimes classed as part of the Burnie metropolitan area.

== Council ==
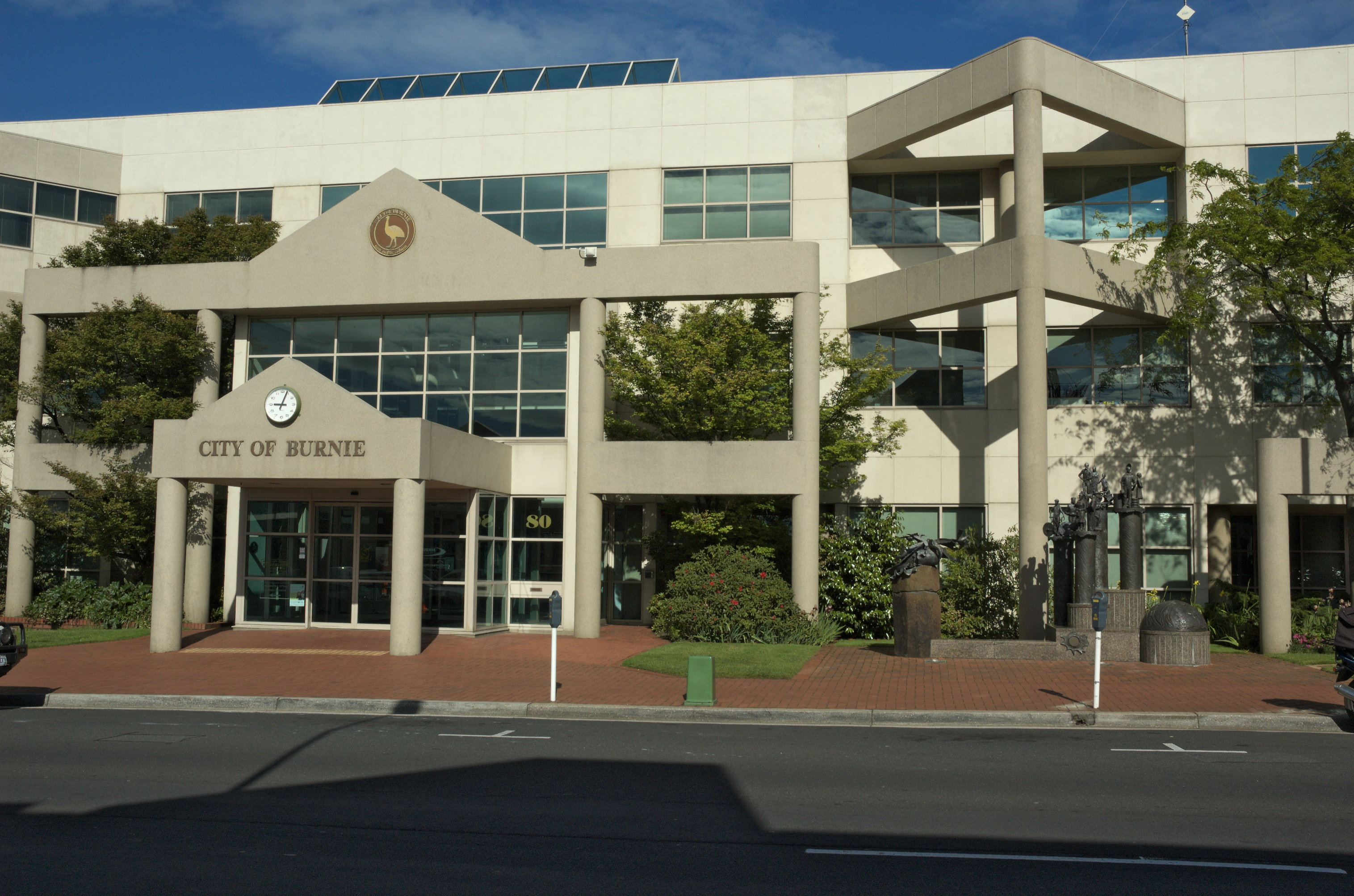
Burnie City Council offices

The Burnie City Council consists of nine councillors, who each serve a four-year term of office. Traditionally the term "alderman" was used, but was changed by a council vote on 20 November 2018. The members following the 2022 election are:

| Name | Position | Party affiliation |
|---|---|---|
| Teeny Brumby | Mayor/Councillor | Independent |
| Giovanna Simpson | Deputy Mayor/Councillor | Independent |
| Steve Kons | Councillor | Labor |
| Trent Aitken | Councillor | Independent |
| Justin Grave | Councillor | Independent |
| Ken Dorsey | Councillor | Independent |
| Amina Keygan | Councillor | Labor |
| Chris Lynch | Councillor | Labor |
| David Pease | Councillor | Independent |

=== 2022 election results ===
2022 Tasmanian local elections: Burnie
| Party | Candidate | Votes | % | ±% |
|---|---|---|---|---|
| Independent | Teeny Brumby (elected) | 2,201 | 18.55 | |
| Independent Labor | Steve Kons (elected) | 1,573 | 13.26 | |
| Independent | Giovanna Simpson (elected) | 1,318 | 11.11 | |
| Independent | Trent Aitkin (elected) | 1,061 | 8.94 | |
| Independent Labor | Chris Lynch (elected) | 1,000 | 8.43 | |
| Independent | David Pease (elected) | 917 | 7.73 | |
| Independent Labor | Amina Keygan (elected) | 749 | 6.31 | |
| Independent | Ken Dorsey (elected) | 699 | 5.89 | |
| Independent | Alvwyn Boyd | 608 | 5.12 | |
| Independent | Justin Grave (elected) | 565 | 4.76 | |
| Independent | Craig Hensley | 395 | 3.33 | |
| Independent | Ryan Gilmour | 286 | 2.41 | |
| Greens | Ceilidh Newbury | 255 | 2.15 | |
| Independent | Jarrod Boys | 240 | 2.02 | |
| Total formal votes | | 11,867 | 97.06 | |
| Informal votes | | 359 | 2.94 | |
| Turnout | | 12,226 | 80.84 | |
Party total votes
| Independent | | 8,290 | 69.87 | |
| Independent Labor | | 3,322 | 27.99 | |
| Greens | | 255 | 2.15 | |

== Suburbs ==
The following gazetted suburbs/localities are fully or partially within the City of Burnie:

| Suburb | Census population 2016 | Notes |
|---|---|---|
| Acton | 1,349 | |
| Brooklyn | 553 | |
| Burnie | 596 | Central business district |
| Camdale | 72 | |
| Chasm Creek | 68 | |
| Cooee | 527 | |
| Downlands | 240 | |
| East Cam | 170 | |
| East Ridgley | 103 | |
| Emu Heights | 180 | |
| Hampshire | 51 | partial, see note below |
| Havenview | 715 | |
| Heybridge | | partial, see note below |
| Highclere | 120 | |
| Hillcrest | 1,042 | |
| Montello | 1,217 | |
| Mooreville | 303 | |
| Natone | 281 | |
| Ocean Vista | 306 | |
| Oonah | 0 | partial, see note below |
| Park Grove | 2,385 | |
| Parklands | 850 | |
| Parrawe | | partial, see note below |
| Ridgley | 604 | |
| Romaine | 1,713 | |
| Round Hill | 109 | |
| Shorewell Park | 2,008 | |
| South Burnie | 331 | |
| Stowport | 404 | |
| Tewkesbury | 76 | |
| Upper Burnie | 1,821 | |
| Upper Natone | 112 | |
| Upper Stowport | 105 | |
| West Mooreville | 114 | |
| West Ridgley | 125 | |
| Wivenhoe | 220 | |
| Total | 18870 | |
| | 25 | Variance |
| Local government total | 18895 | Gazetted Burnie local government area |

Only the part of Heybridge to the west of the Blythe River is in the City of Burnie. Most of its population of 430 would be to the east in Central Coast.

Oonah mostly lies in Waratah-Wynyard, but the 2016 census recorded a population of zero in any case.

A small part of Hampshire extends into Waratah-Wynyard, but all of its population is likely to be in the City of Burnie.

Parrawe mostly lies in Waratah-Wynyard. The small area in the City of Burnie is likely to be unpopulated.

== See also ==
- List of local government areas of Tasmania
