= South Burnie =

- Suburb
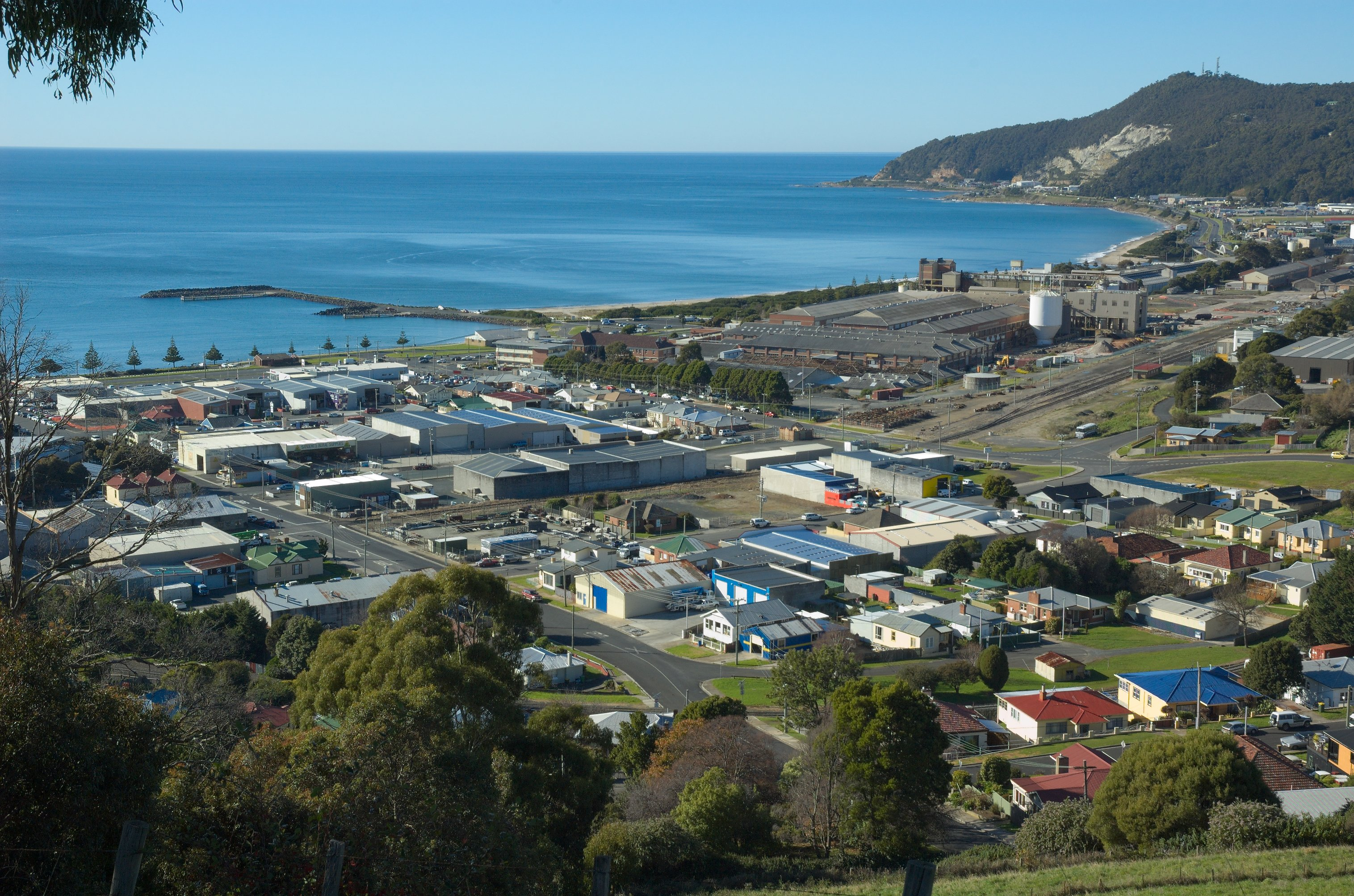
- South Burnie in 2012

- Interactive map of South Burnie
- Coordinates: 41°04′04″S 145°54′51″E
- Country: Australia
- State: Tasmania
- Region: North West Tasmania
- City: Burnie
- LGA: City of Burnie
- Location: 2.5 km (1.6 mi) SE of Burnie

Government
  - State electorate: Braddon
  - Federal division: Braddon

Population
  - Total: 348 (2021 census)
- Postcode: 7320
Suburbs around South Burnie
Burnie	Bass Strait	Bass Strait
Hillcrest	South Burnie	Wivenhoe
Upper Burnie	Brooklyn	Emu Heights

South Burnie is a suburb of Burnie, Tasmania, Australia. It is located about 2.5 kilometres (1.6 mi) south-east of the town of Burnie. The Bass Highway passes from south-east to north-west along the shore of Bass Strait, which forms part of the northern boundary. The Emu River forms part of the eastern boundary. As at the 2021 census it had a population of 348.

== History ==
The municipal area of City of Burnie, of which South Burnie is part, was proclaimed a city on 26 April 1988. It was previously named Emu Bay Municipality. The municipality and the bay to its north were named for the Emu River, which was named in 1827 for emu tracks seen in the vicinity. Burnie, and thus South Burnie, was named for William Burnie, who was the Director of the Van Diemen's Land Company.

== Road infrastructure ==
The C112 route (Massy-Greene Drive) terminates at the Bass Highway in South Burnie. It runs south to Emu Heights, and from there provides access to the B18 route (Ridgley Highway) which leads to the Murchison Highway.
