= Emu Bay (Tasmanian geographic feature) =

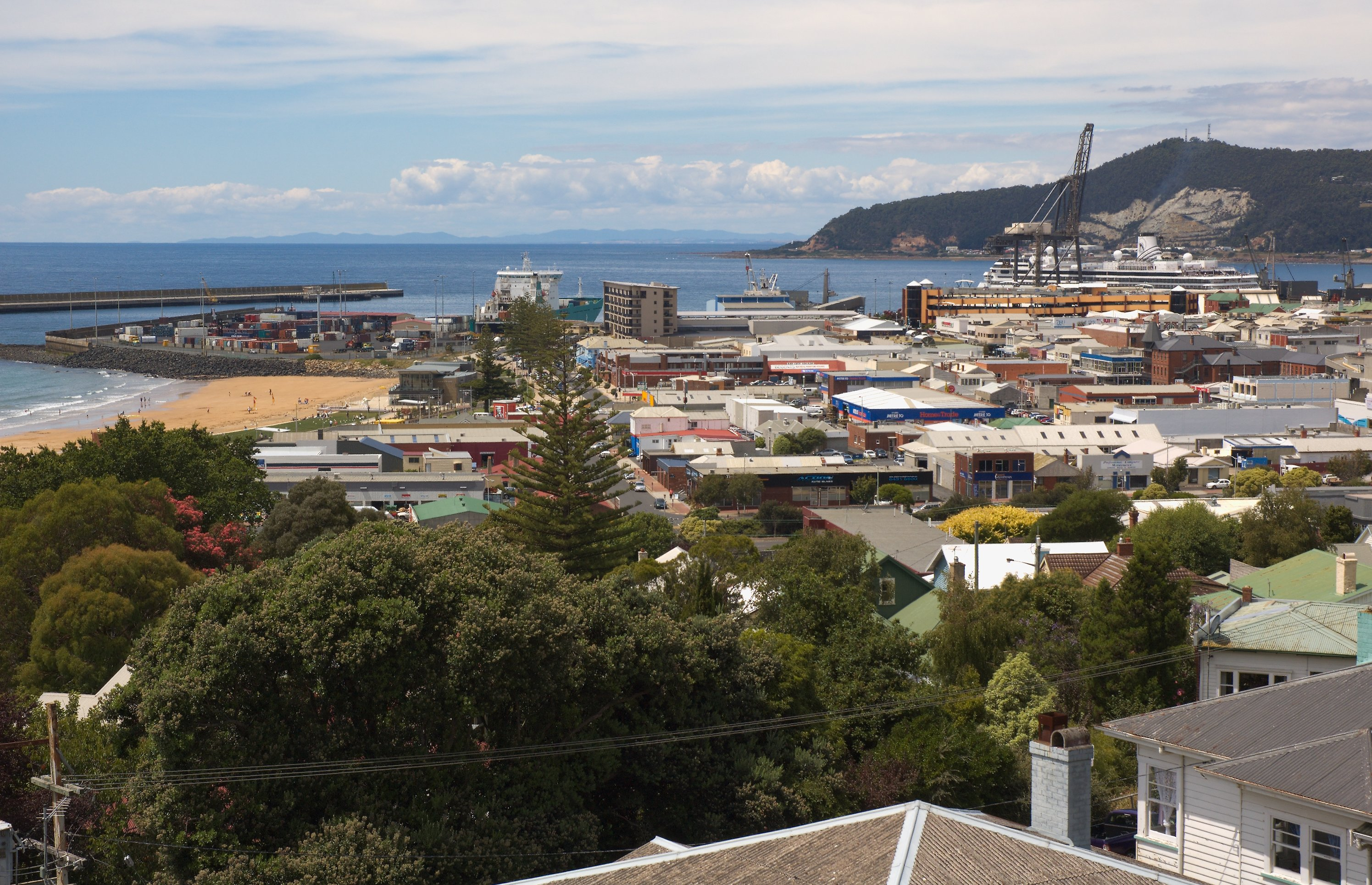
- Emu Bay in the distance, with Burne Port in the foreground.

- Location in Tasmania
- Location: North West Tasmania
- Coordinates: 41°03′49″S 145°52′31″E
- Type: Embayment
- River sources: Emu River
- Primary outflows: Bass Strait
- Settlements: Burnie

Emu Bay is a bay on the north-western coast of Tasmania, Australia.

The bay is fed by the Emu River and empties into Bass Strait. The bay is adjacent to the city of Burnie, Tasmania, which was also originally named Emu Bay but later renamed for William Burnie a director of the Van Diemen's Land Company in the early 1840s.

== See also ==
- Regions of Tasmania
