= Tasmania Tomorrow =

Tasmania Tomorrow was a Tasmanian government initiative which aimed to improve the post-secondary education experience of Tasmanians. The initiative commenced 1 January 2009, and included restructuring Senior Secondary Colleges (Years 11 and 12) and TAFE Tasmania. It was anticipated that the restructuring would be complete by the start of the 2011 school year.

The institutes created by this initiative were:

- The Tasmanian Academy focusing on academic learning, with a curriculum and academic pathway for Years 11 and 12 students seeking university entrance.
- The Tasmanian Polytechnic focusing on practical learning, with a vocational pathway, supported by academic courses, for Years 11 and 12 and mature-age students seeking employment outcomes or university articulation.
- The Tasmanian Skills Institute focusing on skills development for employees in enterprises, in line with the needs of industry.

== Implementation ==
A project team in the Department of Education was responsible for implementing this initiative through to the 'start up' of the three new organisations in January 2009. Members of the project team were drawn from TAFE Tasmania, the Department of Education including Senior Secondary Colleges, and Skills Tasmania.

A project steering committee was established to oversee the project. This committee was chaired by the Secretary of the Department of Education and included representatives from both TAFE Tasmania and the Department of Education.

Working groups were established to work on key issues such as educational programs, employee relations, logistics, funding and business models.

Other groups were established to provide advice to the steering committee including a leaders group consisting of all college principals and senior Department of Education and TAFE Tasmania staff, and a Guaranteeing Futures Reference Group to provide advice on issues affecting young people including transition to the new organisations.

=== Timeline ===
Following the consultation period (June – October 2007), the Tasmanian government decided to transition to the Tasmania Tomorrow model. The Tasmanian Academy, Tasmanian Polytechnic and the Tasmanian Skills Institute commenced operations during January 2009.

Beginning in 2009, Hobart, Hellyer, Don and Newstead Colleges changed to the new structure. Initially all of these colleges had a campus of the Tasmanian Academy and Tasmanian Polytechnic located on site.

Other colleges were to change to the new structures over the following two years, with all colleges completing transition by 2011. TAFE Tasmania was split to create the Tasmanian Skills Institute and the Tasmanian Polytechnic.

== Restructure of senior secondary colleges ==
=== The Tasmanian Academy ===
This institute was for students aiming to go to university. It had a pre-tertiary focus where students could develop their capacity for thinking, enterprise, communication, IT and life skills. It was connected to future careers, particularly in a Tasmanian context.

The academy was governed by representation from professional bodies, university, the arts, business, industry and parents. It attracted industry and business sponsorship, and had scholarship programs to assist students, particularly those from rural and remote areas.

== Restructure of TAFE Tasmania ==
=== The Tasmanian Polytechnic ===
The Tasmanian Polytechnic offered a wide range of learning and career options to prepare students for employment. Students could work towards a Tasmanian Certificate of Education, choose to go on to university or earn a nationally recognised qualification. Campuses were located throughout the state.

=== The Tasmanian Skills Institute ===
The Tasmanian Skills Institute commenced operations in 2009, and focused on training for apprentices/trainees and up-skilling existing workers. The Tasmanian Skills Institute partnered with businesses to provide workforce skills development and improve the productivity and prosperity of businesses.

Training was flexible, customised to specific needs and extended across all industry sectors. Workshops were held in the workplace, at a campus, or online. The Tasmanian Skills Institute also offered recognition of workers' existing skills.

The Tasmanian Skills Institute supported the following industry skills groups: Allied Construction Trades, Plumbing & Gas, Automotive, Business, Construction, Cookery, Electrotechnology, Food Processing, Hair & Beauty, Community Services and Health, Licensed Skills, Metals & Manufacturing, Mining, Natural Resources, Tourism & Hospitality and Workplace Learning Services.

== Problems ==
The Polytechnic, Academy and Skills Institute were established in a solid attempt to improve retention of students within the educational system after year 10. The old education system was criticized for not working for all students, as Tasmania had, and continues to have one of the lowest post year 10 and 11 retention rates in Australia.

It was considered that rapid change was required to deliver more positive outcomes for students, the local economy and Tasmania. Tasmania Tomorrow aimed to deliver an educational experience which focused on engaging all students.

The Tasmania tomorrow program received harsh criticism by the media and the teachers association of Tasmania. The intensity of criticism seen in the first year of reform gained momentum as the new system showed signs that the changes had been poorly implemented.

In the second semester of 2013, the Polytechnic was dissolved and a reformed TAFE Tasmania began operating as TasTAFE.
