= Emu Heights, Tasmania =

Emu Heights
- Suburb
- Interactive map of Emu Heights
- Coordinates: 41°04′35″S 145°55′13″E
- Country: Australia
- State: Tasmania
- Region: North West Tasmania
- City: Burnie
- LGA: City of Burnie
- Location: 3.8 km (2.4 mi) SE of Burnie

Government
  - State electorate: Braddon
  - Federal division: Braddon

Population
  - Total: 182 (2021 census)
- Postcode: 7320
Suburbs around Emu Heights
South Burnie	South Burnie	Wivenhoe
Hillcrest	Emu Heights	Wivenhoe
Havenview	Stowport	Stowport

Emu Heights is suburb of Burnie, Tasmania, Australia. It is located about 3.8 kilometres (2.4 mi) south-east of the town of Burnie. The Emu River forms the eastern boundary, and the Melba railway line form most of the western. As at the 2021 census it a population of 182.

== History ==
The municipal area of City of Burnie, of which Emu Heights is part, was proclaimed a city on 26 April 1988. It was previously named Emu Bay Municipality. The municipality and the bay to its north were named for the Emu River, which was named in 1827 by explorer Henry Hellyer for emu tracks seen in the vicinity. It is believed that the name of this locality has the same derivation.

== Road infrastructure ==
The C112 route (Old Surrey Road) runs south from the Bass Highway through the locality, and from there provides access to the B18 route (Ridgley Highway) which leads to the Murchison Highway.
