= Shorewell Park =

- Suburb
- Interactive map of Shorewell Park
- Coordinates: 41.069°S 145.879°E
- Country: Australia
- State: Tasmania
- Region: North-west and west
- City: Burnie
- LGA: City of Burnie
- Location: 4 km (2.5 mi) SW of Burnie

Government
  - State electorate: Braddon
  - Federal division: Braddon

Population
  - Total: 2,008 (2016 census)
- Postcode: 7320
Suburbs around Shorewell Park
East Cam	Park Grove	Hillcrest
East Cam	Shorewell Park	Acton
Mooreville	Mooreville	Downlands

Shorewell Park is a residential locality in the local government area (LGA) of Burnie in the North-west and west LGA region of Tasmania. The locality is about 4 kilometres (2.5 mi) south-west of the town of Burnie. The 2016 census recorded a population of 2008 for the state suburb of Shorewell Park. It is a south western suburb of Burnie, Tasmania, which was established in the 1970s as a broadacre social housing area. The residential housing expanded in the 1980s and in 2012 the Tasmanian Government released a plan for the next 20 years.

The Hilltop Plaza Shopping Centre provides essential services such as a supermarket, bottle shop, hairdressing salon and pharmacy.

The Burnie Community House provides locals with assistance, training and opportunities. It has a market garden as one of its projects.

== History ==
Shorewell Park was gazetted as a locality in 1976. It had previously been named Cangort Park in 1974.

== Geography ==
Cooee Creek forms the western boundary, and Shorewell Creek most of the eastern.

== Road infrastructure ==
Route C110 (Mooreville Road) runs through from north to south.

== Education ==
- Hellyer College
- TAFE Tasmania
