= Stowport, Tasmania =

Stowport
- Suburb
- Interactive map of Stowport
- Country: Australia
- State: Tasmania
- Region: North-west and west
- City: Burnie
- LGA: City of Burnie
- Location: 11 km (6.8 mi) SE of Burnie

Government
  - State electorate: Braddon
  - Federal division: Braddon

Population
  - Total: 404 (2016)
- Postcode: 7321
Suburbs around Stowport
Heybridge	Wivenhoe	Emu Heights
Mooreville	Stowport	Cuprona
Ridgley	Upper Stowport	Cuprona

Stowport is a rural residential locality in the local government area (LGA) of Burnie in the North-west and west LGA region of Tasmania. The locality is about 11 kilometres (6.8 mi) south-east of the town of Burnie. The 2016 census recorded a population of 404 for the state suburb of Stowport. It includes Glance Creek in its population statistics.

While there is some residential allotments the area is mainly agricultural farming land. One of the historical farms was called "Karingal" c. 1910. Chasm Creek Runs down through the property.

There is a community hall (Stowport Hall) and a local butchery.

Glance Creek Estate, a winery established in 2011, is located in Stowport near Burnie in Northern Tasmania. It produces grapes and various fruit wines including myrtus and blueberry.

== History ==
Stowport was used as a parish name in 1856, and a town plan was produced about 1900. Stowport was gazetted as a locality in 1966.

== Geography ==
The Blythe River forms the eastern boundary, and Emu River forms the western.

== Road infrastructure ==
The C102 route (Stowport Road / Natone Road) passes through from north-west to south-east. Route C113 (Minna Road) starts at an intersection with C102 and runs north-east until it exits. Route C114 (Upper Stowport Road) starts at an intersection with C102 and runs south until it exits.

== Sport ==
=== Cricket ===
The Stowport Cricket Club compete in the Burnie Cricket league.
