= Parklands High School (Burnie) =

School in Tasmania, Australia

Location
- Atkins Drive; Romaine, Burnie, Tasmania; Australia; 41°04′50″S 145°54′03″E

Information
- Type: Government comprehensive secondary school
- Motto: Straight forward and always honourable
- Established: 1958; 68 years ago
- Status: Open
- School district: Northern
- Educational authority: Department for Education, Children and Young People
- Oversight: Office of Tasmanian Assessment, Standards & Certification
- Principal: Magella Dudley
- Teaching staff: 31.8 FTE (2019)
- Years: 7–12
- Gender: Co-educational
- Enrolment: 424 (2025)
- Campus size: 21 hectares (52 acres)
- Campus type: Regional
- Colours: green, yellow, navy blue
- Website: parklandshigh.education.tas.edu.au

Parklands High School is a government co-educational comprehensive secondary school located in Romaine, a suburb of Burnie, Tasmania, Australia. Established in 1958, the school caters for approximately 424 students from Years 7 to 12. The school is administered by the Department for Education, Children and Young People.

In 2025 student enrolments were 424. The school principal is Magella Dudley.

In 1966, the school was relocated from near West Park to a 21-hectare (52-acre) site in Romaine.

== See also ==
- Education in Tasmania
- List of schools in Tasmania
