= Hillcrest, Tasmania =

Hillcrest
- Suburb
- Interactive map of Hillcrest
- Coordinates: 41.063°S 145.895°E
- Country: Australia
- State: Tasmania
- Region: North-west and west
- City: Burnie
- LGA: City of Burnie
- Location: 2 km (1.2 mi) SW of Burnie

Government
  - State electorate: Braddon
  - Federal division: Braddon

Population
  - Total: 1,088 (2021 census)
- Postcode: 7320
Suburbs around Hillcrest
Park Grove	Montello	Burnie
Shorewell Park	Hillcrest	Upper Burnie
Shorewell Park	Acton	Upper Burnie

Hillcrest is a residential locality in Tasmania, Australia about 2 kilometres (1.2 mi) south-west of Burnie. As at the 2021 census it a population of 1,088.

The Sampson Street Reserve is 2.3ha of public open space.

There is a shopping complex which includes a cafe and takeaway.

Hillcrest includes part of the Terrylands estate, which was developed from around 1949 by the Agricultural Bank. The rest is located in Montello. Terrylands is sometimes used informally as a suburb, but is not officially gazetted.

== History ==
Hillcrest was gazetted as a locality in 1966.

== Geography ==
Shorewell Creek forms most of the western boundary.

== Road infrastructure ==
Route A2 (Bass Highway) passes to the north-east. From there, various streets provide access to the locality.

== Sport ==
The Burnie Aquatic Centre, with indoor and outdoor swimming pools, is located in Hillcrest. The Burnie Judo Club trains at the facilities owned by the Burnie PCYC.
