= Emu River (Tasmania) =

River in Tasmania, Australia

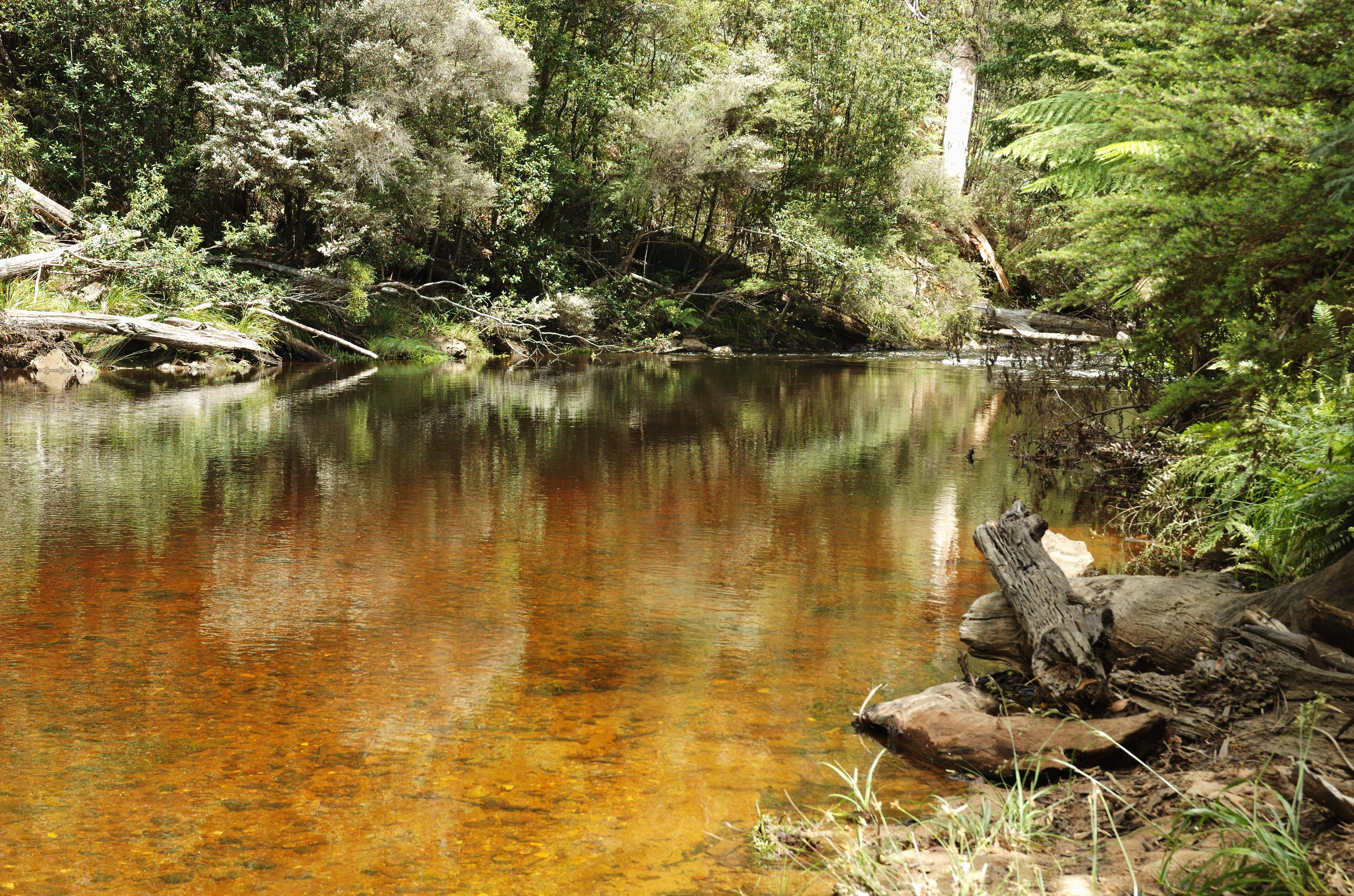

- Location of the Emu River mouth in Tasmania

Location
- Country: Australia
- State: Tasmania
- Region: North-west

Physical characteristics
- Source: below Companion Hill
  - location: near Saint Valentines Peak
  - coordinates: 41°21′26″S 145°43′34″E
  - elevation: 548 m (1,798 ft)
- Mouth: Bass Strait
  - location: Wivenhoe / South Burnie midpoint
  - coordinates: 41°03′57″S 145°55′22″E
  - elevation: 0 m (0 ft)
- Length: 52.2 km (32.4 mi)

The Emu River is a perennial river for most of its length, located in the north-western region of Tasmania, Australia. It was named by Henry Hellyer, an early explorer who saw emu tracks in the vicinity.

== Location and features ==
The river rises below Companion Hill (853 m (2,799 ft)) (Note: Placename Nomen # for Companion Hill = 1837Q) near Saint Valentines Peak (1,107 m (3,632 ft)), (Note: Placename Nomen # for Saint Valentines Peak = 19378F) passes through Companion Reservoir, (Note: Placename Nomen # for Companion Reservoir = 13887Q) and flows generally north into Emu Bay at Wivenhoe. The river descends 548 metres (1,798 ft) over its 52.2-kilometre (32.4 mi) course.

== See also ==
- List of rivers of Australia § Tasmania
