= Burnie =

Port city in Tasmania, Australia

Burnie Pataway (Northern Tasmanian)
- City
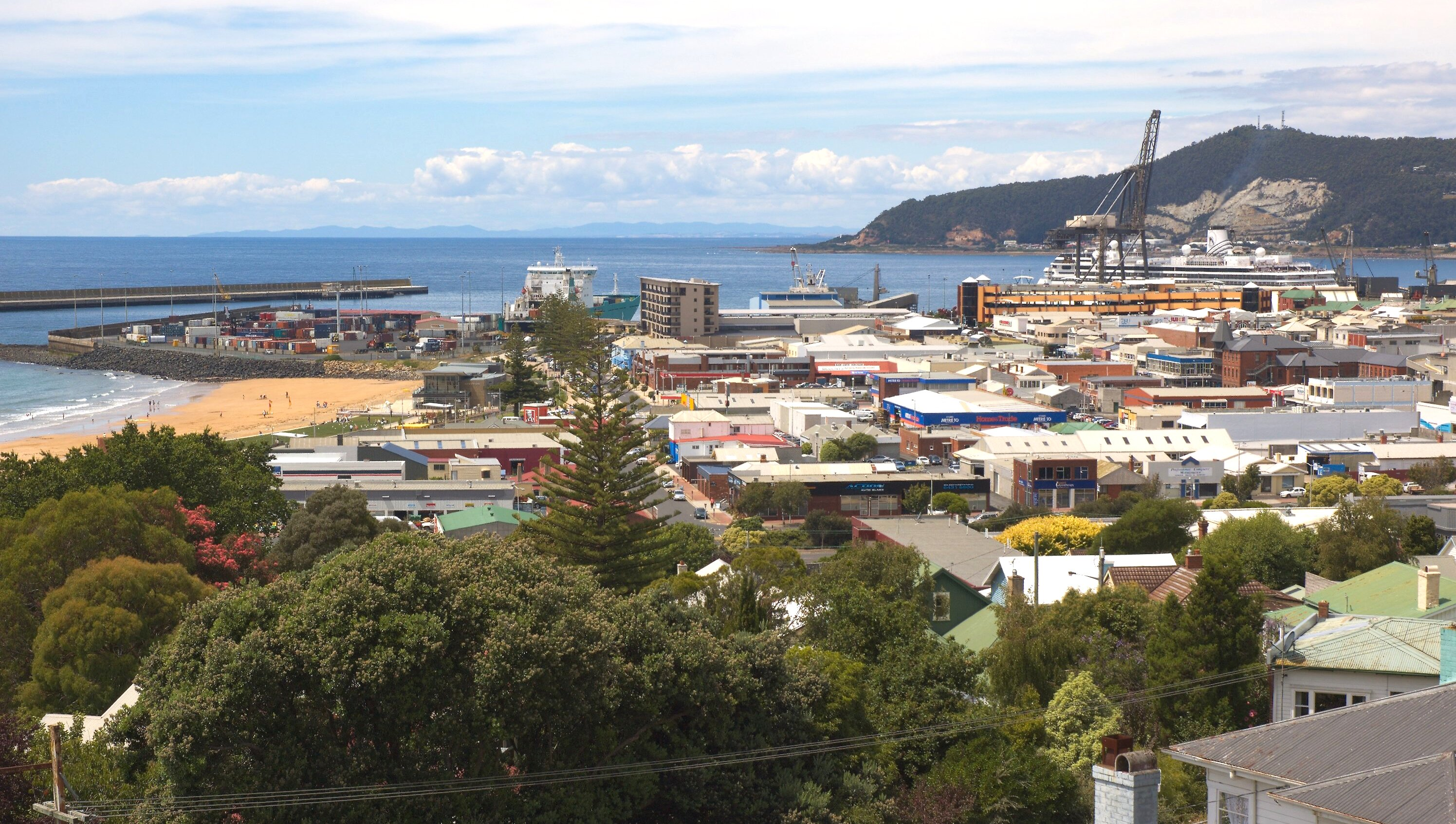
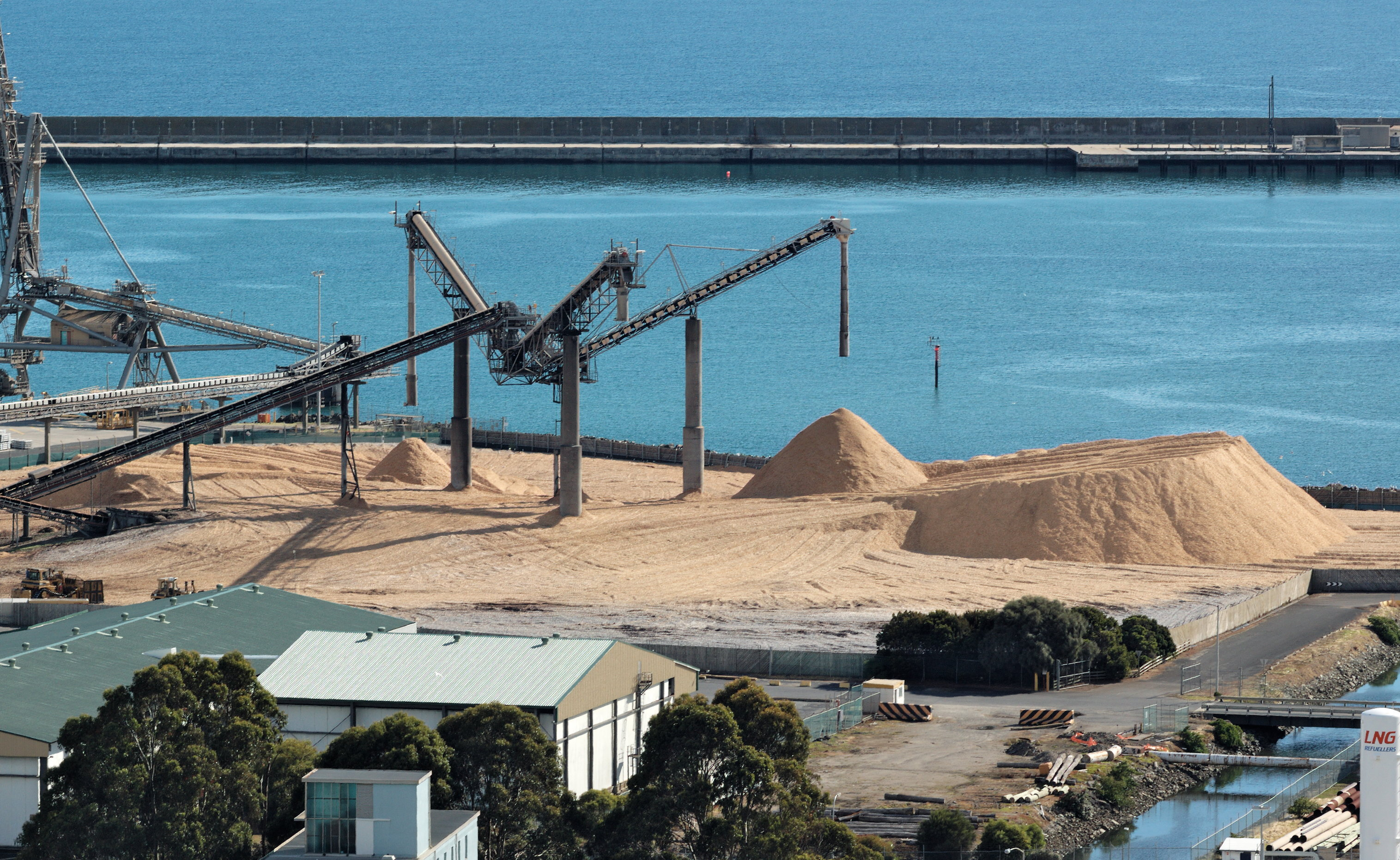
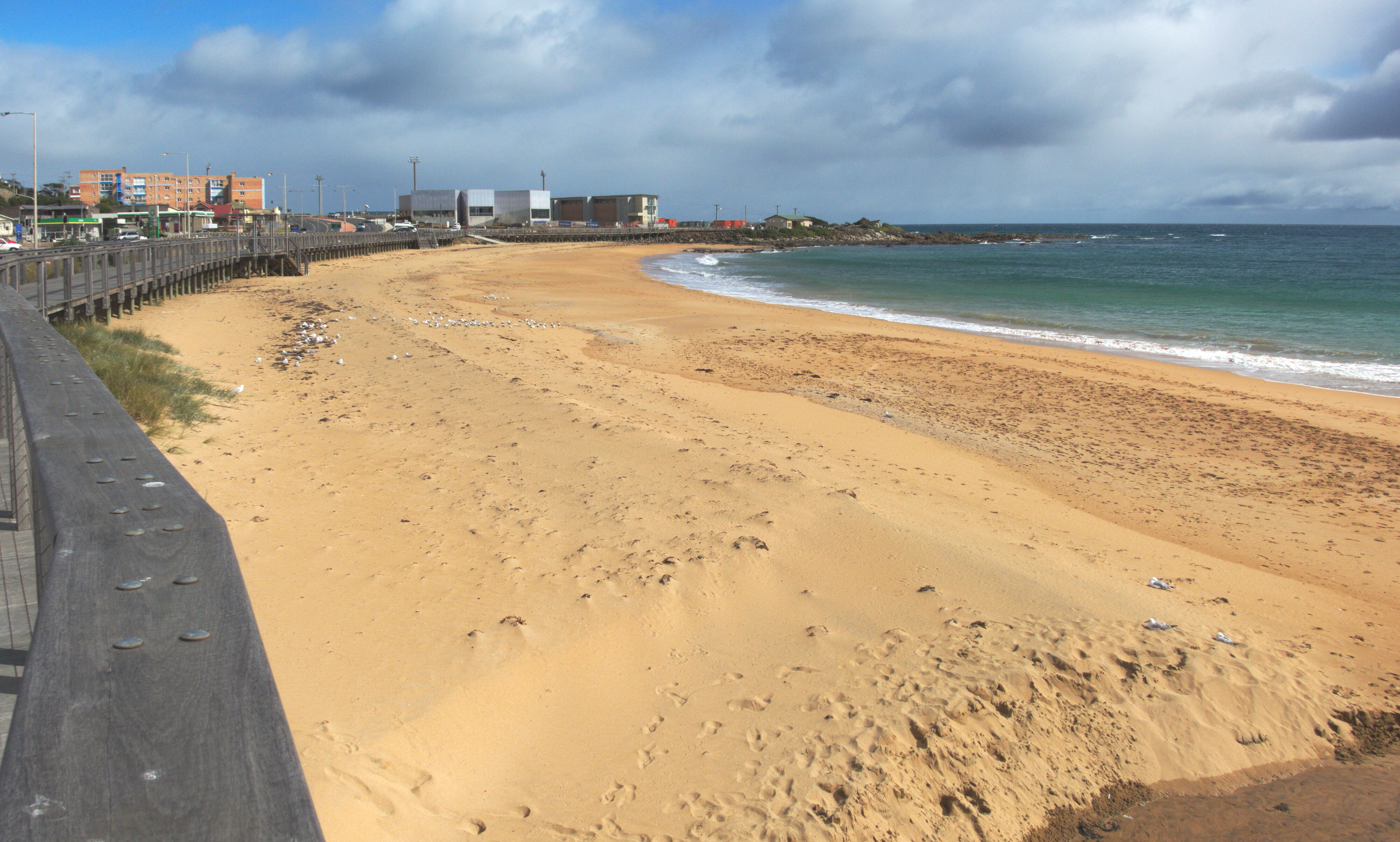
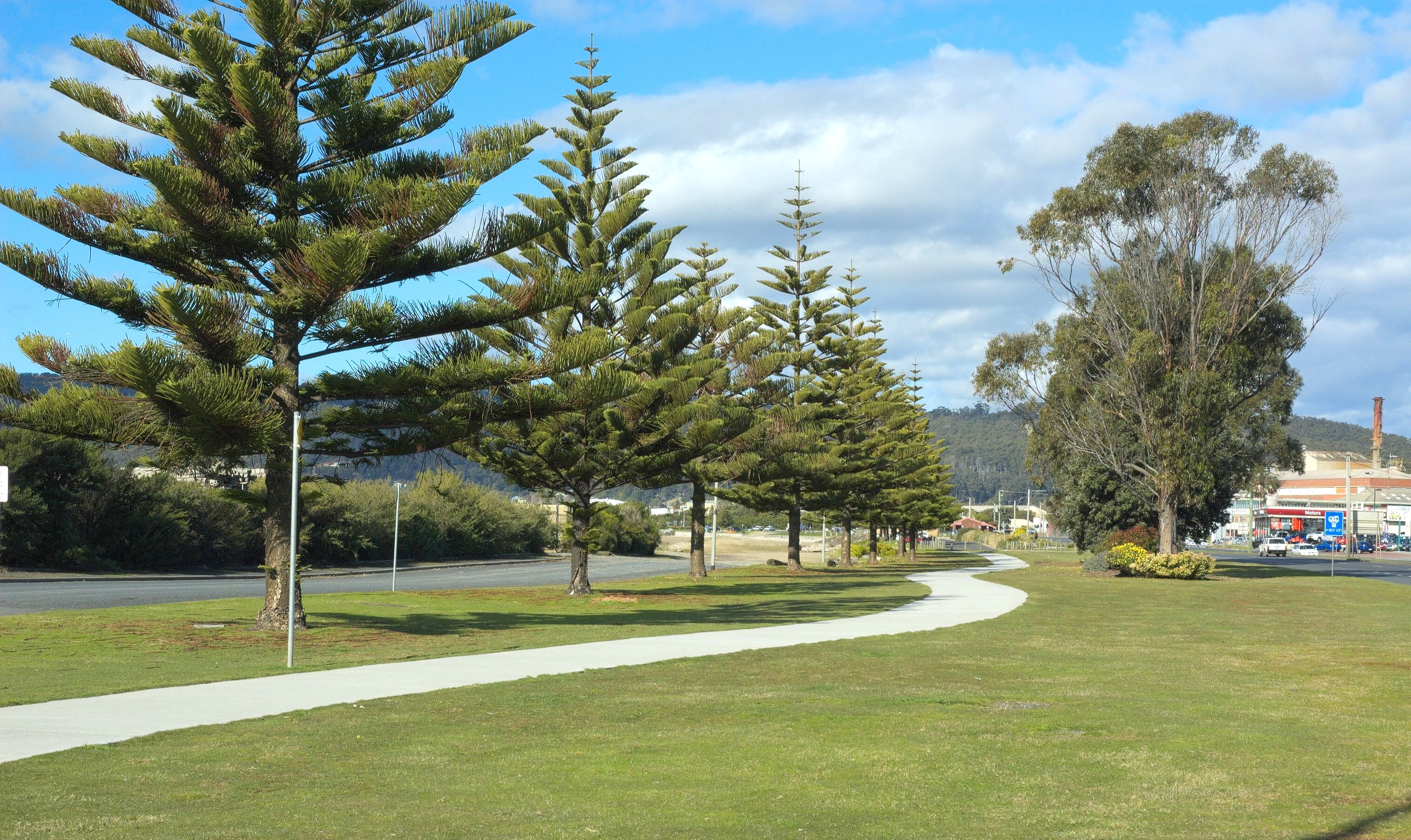
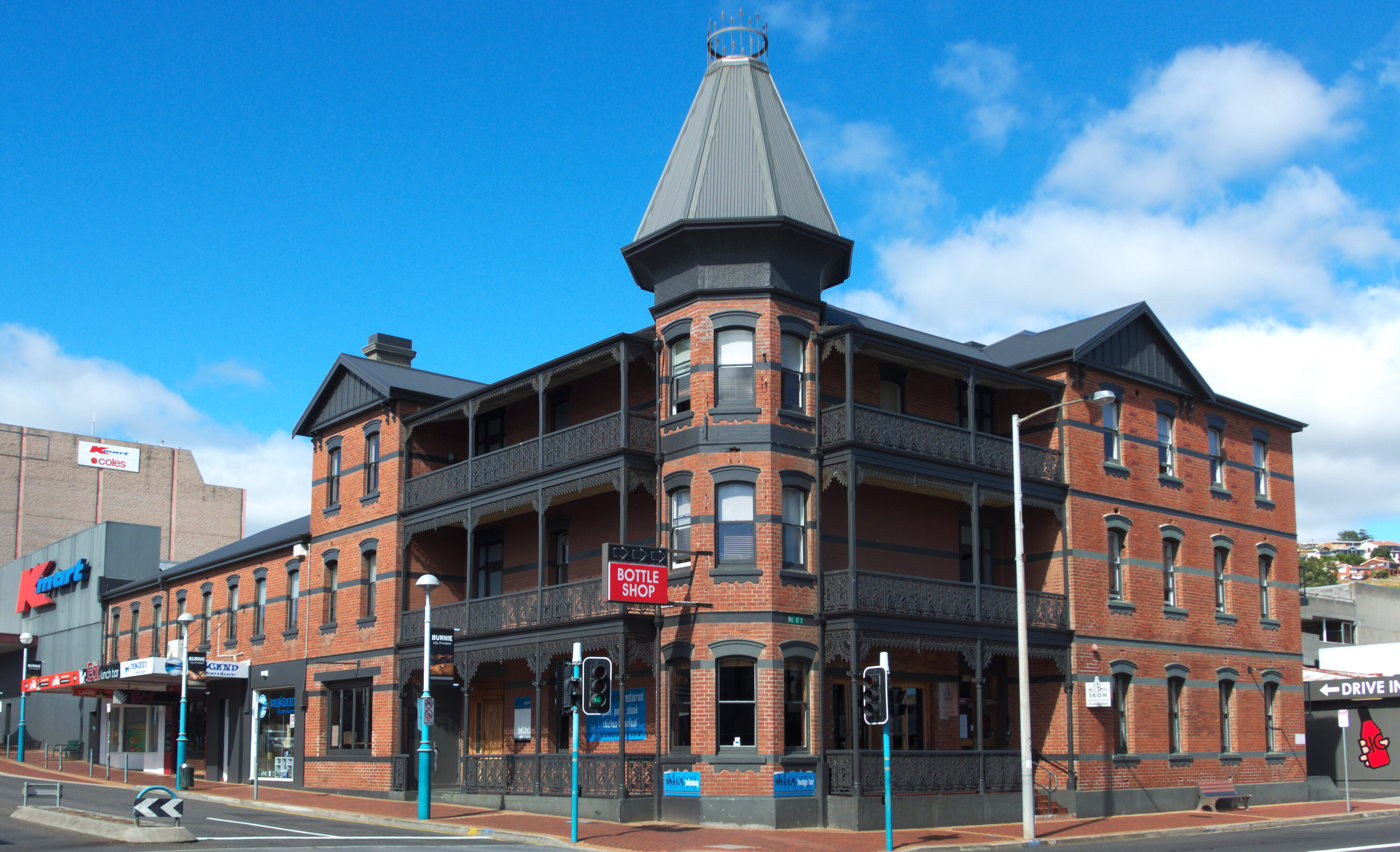
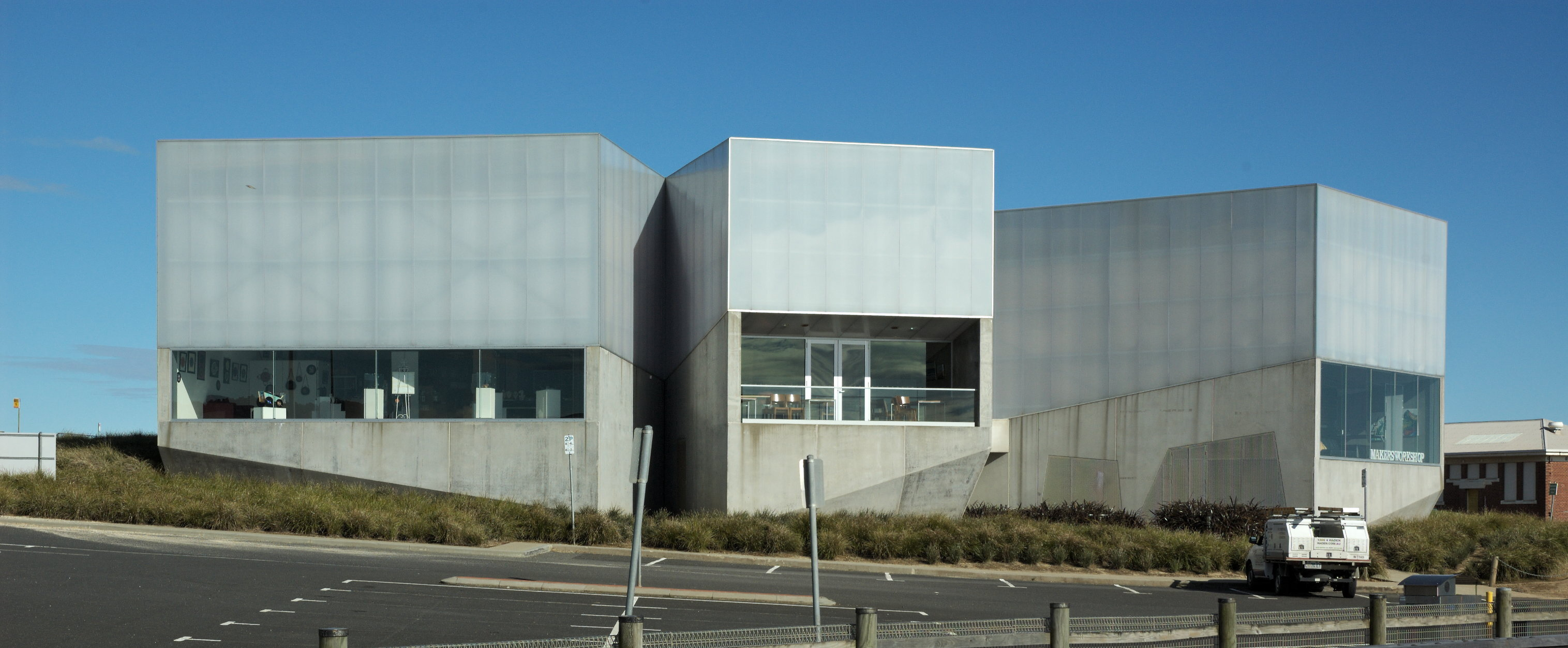
- From top; left to right: Burnie CBD, Port of Burnie, West Beach, Burnie Park,Ember and Vines (formerly Ikon Hotel), UTAS Maker's Workshop

- Coordinates: 41°03′49″S 145°52′31″E
- Country: Australia
- State: Tasmania
- LGA: City of Burnie
- Location: 47 km (29 mi) from Devonport; 134 km (83 mi) from Launceston; 154 km (96 mi) from Queenstown; 296 km (184 mi) from Hobart
- Established: 1827

Government
  - State electorate: Braddon
  - Federal division: Braddon
- Elevation: 19 m (62 ft)

Population
  - Total: 20,417 (2025)
- Time zone: UTC+10 (AEST)
  - Summer (DST): UTC+11 (AEDT)
- Postcode: 7320
- Gazetted: 1967
- Mean max temp: 16.9 °C (62.4 °F)
- Mean min temp: 9.3 °C (48.7 °F)
- Annual rainfall: 947.4 mm (37.30 in)

Burnie (/ˈbɜːrni/ BER-nee; pirinilaplu/palawa kani: Pataway) is a port city on the north-west coast of Tasmania, Australia. It is the fourth largest city on the island, located approximately 325 kilometres (202 mi) north-west of the state capital of Hobart, 147 kilometres (91 mi) north-west of Launceston, and 47 kilometres (29 mi) west of Devonport. Founded in 1827 as Emu Bay, the township was renamed in the early 1840s after William Burnie, a director of the Van Diemen's Land Company, and proclaimed a city by Queen Elizabeth II on 26 April 1988. As of the 2021 census, Burnie has a population of 19,918, with a municipality area of 600 square kilometres (230 sq mi), administered by the City of Burnie.

Burnie’s economy has historically been driven by heavy manufacturing, mining, forestry, and farming. The city is located on the Emu Bay coastline, with its fortunes closely tied to its deep water port. The Port of Burnie handles over 5,000,000 tonnes (4,900,000 long tons; 5,500,000 short tons) of freight annually, including nearly half of Tasmania’s containerised freight, and is the state’s primary gateway for mineral and forestry exports. The Burnie Chip Export Terminal, often referred to as the "Pyramids of Burnie", surpassed 1,500,000 tonnes (1,500,000 long tons; 1,700,000 short tons) of annual woodchip exports in 2017.

Industrial decline in the late 20th century, culminating in the 2010 closure of the Associated Pulp and Paper Mills paper mill, which had been one of Burnie’s largest employers, brought economic and social challenges to the city. In the 21st century, Burnie has pursued diversification, with growth in education, healthcare, and logistics, alongside proposals in renewable energy and advanced manufacturing that align with Tasmania’s aspiration to achieve 200% renewable electricity generation by 2040.

== History ==
=== Early history (1827–1875) ===
Burnie's history is closely tied to the establishment of the Van Diemen's Land Company (VDL Company) in the early 19th century. In 1824, a group of wool merchants, bankers, investors, and woollen mill owners gathered in London to explore the idea of creating a land company in Van Diemen's Land, following the model of the Australian Agricultural Company in the Colony of New South Wales. With backing from William Sorell, a former lieutenant governor, and Edward Curr, who had recently returned from the colony, they established the VDL Company, with William Burnie its inaugural Governor of Company. They applied to Lord Bathurst for a grant of 500,000 acres (200,000 ha), while Bathurst approved a smaller allotment of 250,000 acres (100,000 ha), the company received a Royal Charter in 1825, giving it broad authority to cultivate land, and build housing and wharves to support colonial development within a 250,000-acre (100,000 ha) area in North-West Tasmania.

Oakleigh Park, situated near the modern business centre, is regarded as the birthplace of Burnie and a pivotal site in the development of Tasmania’s northwest coast. In 1827, Henry Hellyer, chief surveyor of the Van Diemen's Land Company (VDL Company), established a camp beside Whalebone Creek. With the approval of the Company's chief agent, Edward Curr, Hellyer selected Emu Bay as the primary port to service the Company’s vast inland grazing holdings at Hampshire and Surrey Hills, located approximately 50 kilometres (31 mi) inland.

The strategic value of the site was recognized early; in 1828, government surveyor John Helder Wedge recommended that Emu Bay be reserved as an official township. However, the VDL Company had already established a presence, with the initial settlement consisting of a store, a small jetty, a sawpit, and several huts. During this period, Hellyer oversaw the construction of the Old Surrey Road. Cut through dense rainforest starting from South Burnie beach, it served as the first road on the North West Coast, linking the coast to the interior.

However, Burnie’s settlement wasn’t peaceful. Between 1828 and 1832, Tarenorerer, a Tommeginne woman who had escaped from sealers, became the leader of the Emu Bay people (Plairhekehillerplue). She led a resistance against settlers during the Black War, attacking VDL Company employees until she was eventually captured. Alexander Goldie, the first superintendent of the Company's land assets around Emu Bay, led armed attacks against the Plairhekehillerplue clan. In 1828, Goldie and his men massacred several people inland from the settlement and in August 1829 they murdered a native woman at Emu Bay by shooting her and cutting her neck with an axe. Goldie then kidnapped the woman's five-year-old daughter and another woman. After an investigation, Goldie resigned from his position. Meanwhile, the VDL Company faced difficulties. By 1833, sheep farming at Surrey Hills had failed due to cold conditions, resulting in the near abandonment of the area.

Throughout the 1840s, the VDL Company began leasing bush blocks to tenant farmers, although Burnie’s growth remained slow. In 1843, the town was surveyed by Nathaniel Kentish and renamed after William Burnie, then serving as one of eighteen directors of the VDL Company. By 1853, Burnie had a population of approximately 200, with basic services such as a doctor and clergyman located in Port Sorell, and a lawyer and banker in Launceston. Transport and communication systems were rudimentary at this time, with no metal roads or established wharves. Nevertheless, the first official birth registrations in Burnie began that year.

Burnie’s first school was opened in 1862 by Mrs. Mary Morris in West Burnie, followed by the construction of the first government school on a rocky hill off Wilmot Street. In 1875, the VDL Company established its headquarters in Oakleigh (now Oakleigh Park), which remained in Burnie until the early 1950s. Burnie became the base for developing the region’s road and rail infrastructure.

=== Mineral boom and industrial development (1876–1939) ===
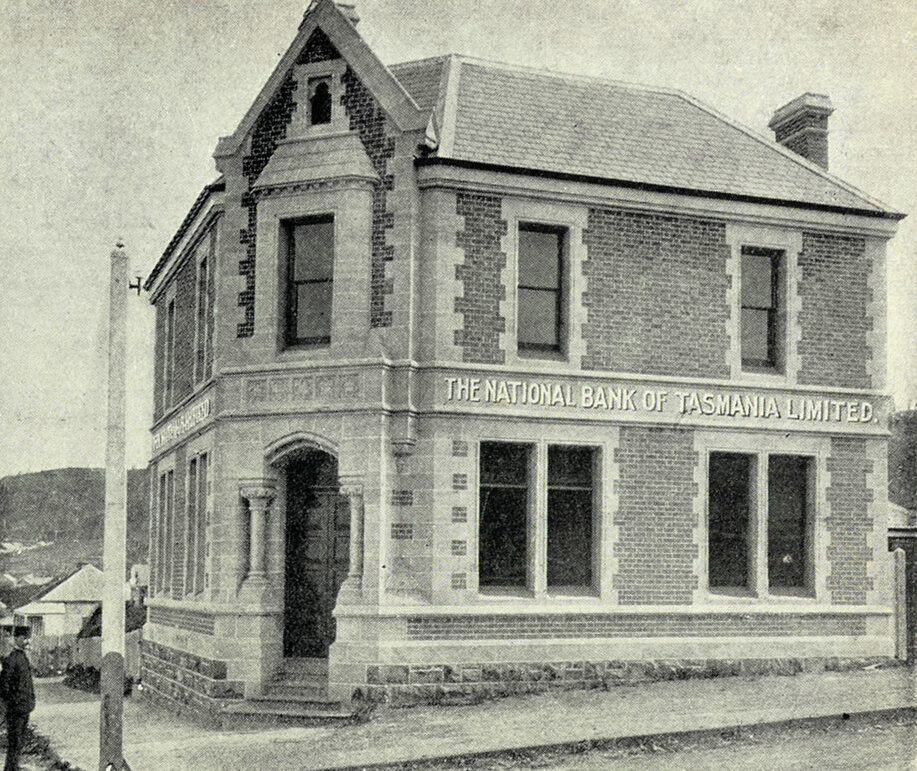
The National Bank of Tasmania branch in Burnie, c. 1905

In the late 1870s, modern communication systems arrived, with the telegraph and telephone reaching Burnie. A horse-drawn tramway on wooden rails was established to connect Burnie to Waratah. The VDL Company later upgraded this tramway to iron and steam, facilitating the transport of tin from the Mount Bischoff mine, which commenced Burnie’s role as the west coast’s export gateway for minerals. By the 1880s, Burnie's fortunes had dramatically improved as west coast mineral deposits were discovered. The Emu Bay Railway Company extended the railway to Zeehan by 1900, propelling the town's population to over 1,500.

During this time, Burnie’s business district rapidly grew, thanks to improved port facilities and the expansion of the town's infrastructure. By 1900, T. Wiseman's motor coach service was operating between Burnie and Stanley, reflecting Burnie's growing importance as a regional transport hub.

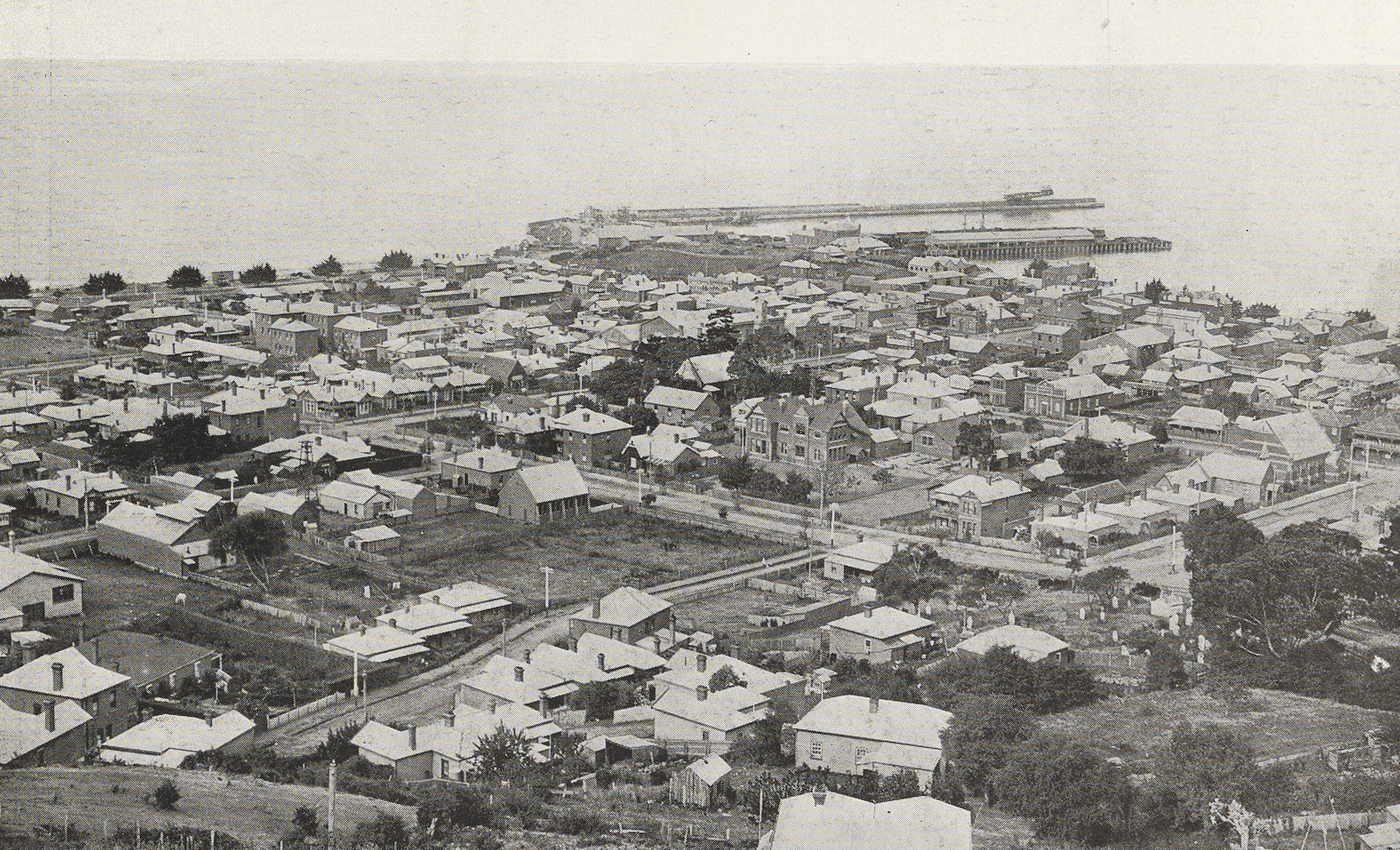
Burnie township, c. 1919

A major turning point occurred in 1936 with the development of the pulp and paper mill in South Burnie. Constructed by Associated Pulp and Paper Mills (APPM), by 1939 the mill produced 15,000 tonnes (15,000 long tons; 17,000 short tons) of fine paper annually, the first time in the world that paper was made entirely from eucalypt pulp. This industrial expansion caused a surge in employment and population growth, setting Burnie on the path to becoming an industrial powerhouse.

=== Post-war boom and industrial expansion (1940–1980s) ===
The post-war era saw Burnie become synonymous with heavy industry. Throughout the 1950s and 1960s, APPM expanded its workforce to around 3,500 employees, while other secondary industries, including pigment producer Tioxide and North-West Acid, were established. This industrial boom led to Burnie’s official recognition as a city in 1988. At its peak in the mid 1980s, Burnie had a population exceeding 20,500, thriving as a bustling industrial centre.

However, the town's success came with environmental consequences. During the 1970s, the production of titanium dioxide by Tioxide led to heavy pollution, turning the sea rust-red from effluent. Burnie also developed a reputation as one of Tasmania’s most polluted towns, a situation highlighted by the Australian band Midnight Oil in their song “Burnie,” which criticised the town’s environmental issues.

=== Challenges and reinvention (1980s–present) ===
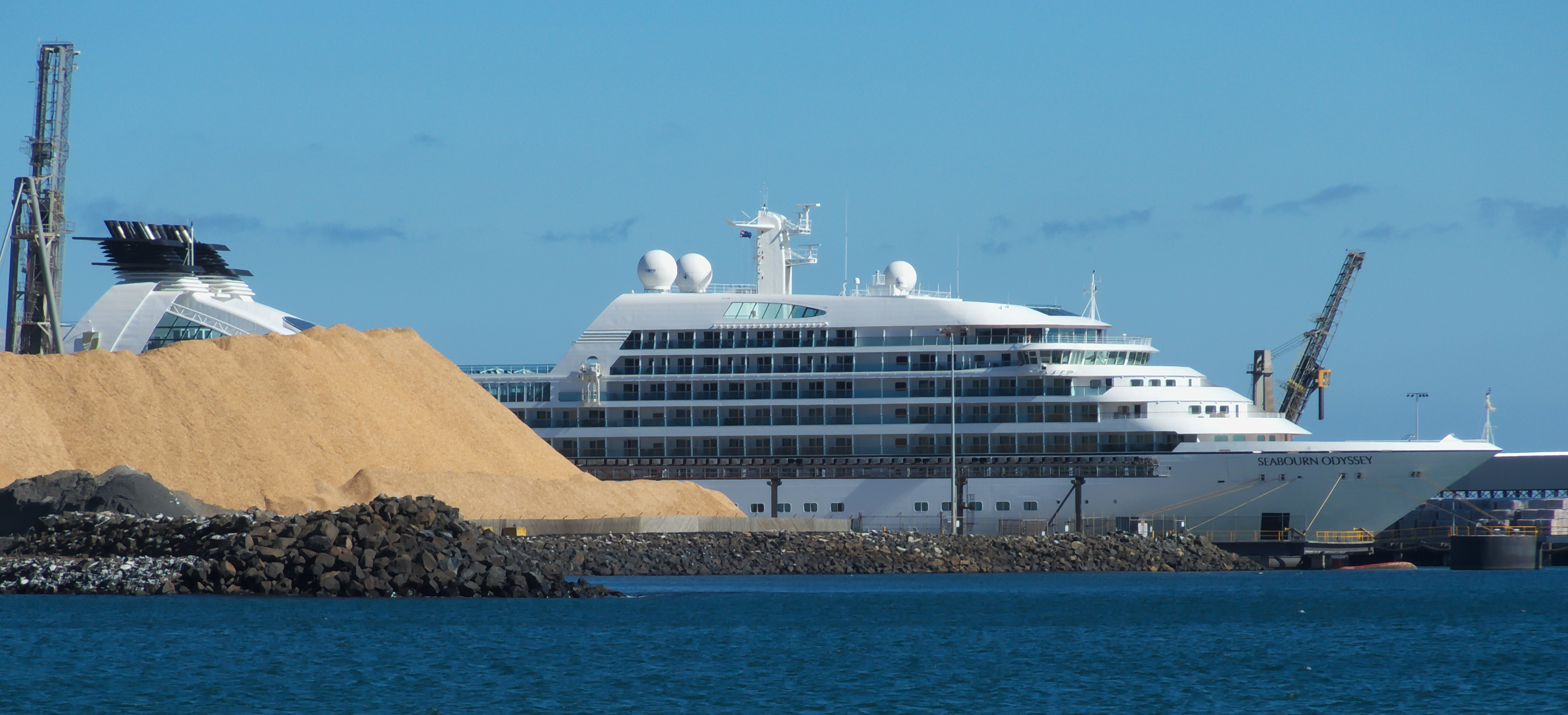
Cruise ship MS Seabourn Odyssey and woodchip stockpile, c. 2016

North-West Acid closed in 1978, and by the 1980s, broader economic rationalisation in Australian manufacturing caused significant downturns in Burnie. APPM downgraded its local operations, closing the original BurnieBoard mill in 1983 and ultimately shutting down the pulp mill in 2010, resulting in substantial job losses. Other major closures followed, including Tioxide Australia in 1998 and the Caterpillar mining machinery manufacturing plant in 2015.

Despite these setbacks, which led to population fluctuations and inconsistent capital investment, Burnie began diversifying its local economy in the late 1990s and 2000s. Since the 2010s, the city has capitalised on its deepwater port and revitalised its coastal foreshore. Following Caterpillar’s departure, the local Elphinstone Group relaunched its original equipment manufacturing brand in 2016, developing off-highway haul vehicles and retaining skilled manufacturing jobs in the region.

In addition to manufacturing and agricultural processing, Burnie has increasingly positioned itself as an educational and cultural hub (such as the development of the University of Tasmania’s West Park campus) and as the primary gateway to Tasmania’s North-West region and the Tarkine wilderness.

== Demographics ==
Historical population
| Year | Pop. | ±% |
|---|---|---|
| 1853 | 200 | — |
| 1933 | 6,659 | +3229.5% |
| 1942 | 9,150 | +37.4% |
| 1947 | 10,080 | +10.2% |
| 1953 | 11,500 | +14.1% |
| 1972 | 19,954 | +73.5% |
| 1973 | 20,300 | +1.7% |
| 1986 | 20,585 | +1.4% |
| 1991 | 20,482 | −0.5% |
| 2001 | 18,108 | −11.6% |
| 2006 | 19,057 | +5.2% |
| 2011 | 19,329 | +1.4% |
| 2016 | 18,895 | −2.2% |
| 2021 | 19,918 | +5.4% |
| 2023 | 20,463 | +2.7% |
Source: Australian Bureau of Statistics census data.

Burnie had a population of 19,918 according to the 2021 census, making it the second largest urban centre in North West Tasmania, after Devonport. Historically, Burnie has experienced periods of rapid growth, particularly in the late 19th and mid-20th centuries, followed by fluctuations in more recent decades, with some signs of stabilisation and recovery in the 21st century. While 2023 State Government growth estimates are positive, Burnie is yet to recover to population levels experienced in the mid 1980s. At the 2021 census, Burnie's population is slightly older compared to national averages, with a significant portion (around 19%) aged 65 and over. This reflects a trend of ageing populations common in regional areas.

Economically, Burnie is a working-class hub with a median household income of $1,148 per week, lower than the national median of $1,746. The city's unemployment rate was around 8.1%, higher than the national rate of 5.1%. These figures suggest some economic challenges in the area, although Burnie's role as a regional port and industrial centre still gives it economic significance within Tasmania.

Burnie also has a notable Indigenous population, with around 8.5% of residents identifying as First Nations people or Torres Strait Islander, higher than the national figure of 3.2%. This reflects Tasmania's broader demographics where Indigenous representation is above the national average. The majority of residents (84.4%) were born in Australia, with smaller populations from England (2.4%), New Zealand (0.9%), India (0.8%), Nepal and the Philippines (0.4%), and mainland China (0.3%). English is the dominant language, spoken by 90.2% of residents at home, while 5.9% of households speak a non-English language.

In terms of religion, 53.4% of Burnie's population reported no religious affiliation, while 38.8% identified with a Christian denomination, including 11.4% as Catholic and 11.2% as Anglican. Other religious groups include Hinduism (0.9%), Buddhism (0.7%), Islam (0.6%), and Sikhism (0.2%).

== Climate ==
Burnie has an oceanic climate (Köppen: Cfb), with mild, relatively dry summers and cool, rainy winters. Seasonal variation is low due to its seaside location along the Bass Strait. Average maxima range from 21.3 °C (70.3 °F) in February to 12.8 °C (55.0 °F) in July, while average minima from 13.3 °C (55.9 °F) in February to 6.0 °C (42.8 °F) in July. Mean annual rainfall is moderate, averaging 947.4 mm (37.30 in) spread on 158 days, and is concentrated in winter.

The town is fairly cloudy, with 141.1 cloudy days and only 51.7 clear days per annum. Extreme temperatures have ranged from −2.0 °C (28.4 °F) on 14 July 1967 to 33.8 °C (92.8 °F) on 31 January 2009. Sunshine data were sourced from Elliott, a rural locality 14.3 kilometres (8.9 mi) west-southwest of Burnie.

Climate data for Burnie (41º04'12"S, 145º56'24"E, 8 m AMSL) (1944–2018, sunshine 1965–1993)
| Month | Jan | Feb | Mar | Apr | May | Jun | Jul | Aug | Sep | Oct | Nov | Dec | Year |
|---|---|---|---|---|---|---|---|---|---|---|---|---|---|
| Record high °C (°F) | 33.8 (92.8) | 31.0 (87.8) | 28.9 (84.0) | 26.2 (79.2) | 24.0 (75.2) | 18.9 (66.0) | 18.3 (64.9) | 18.9 (66.0) | 22.4 (72.3) | 27.6 (81.7) | 31.5 (88.7) | 31.2 (88.2) | 33.8 (92.8) |
| Mean daily maximum °C (°F) | 21.1 (70.0) | 21.3 (70.3) | 20.1 (68.2) | 17.8 (64.0) | 15.3 (59.5) | 13.5 (56.3) | 12.8 (55.0) | 13.2 (55.8) | 14.4 (57.9) | 16.0 (60.8) | 17.9 (64.2) | 19.5 (67.1) | 16.9 (62.4) |
| Mean daily minimum °C (°F) | 12.7 (54.9) | 13.3 (55.9) | 12.1 (53.8) | 10.1 (50.2) | 8.4 (47.1) | 6.8 (44.2) | 6.0 (42.8) | 6.1 (43.0) | 6.8 (44.2) | 8.1 (46.6) | 9.8 (49.6) | 11.2 (52.2) | 9.3 (48.7) |
| Record low °C (°F) | 2.8 (37.0) | 3.9 (39.0) | 3.5 (38.3) | 0.5 (32.9) | 0.0 (32.0) | −1.1 (30.0) | −1.7 (28.9) | −2.0 (28.4) | 0.0 (32.0) | −0.8 (30.6) | 1.0 (33.8) | 2.9 (37.2) | −2.0 (28.4) |
| Average precipitation mm (inches) | 44.9 (1.77) | 43.2 (1.70) | 51.6 (2.03) | 73.0 (2.87) | 94.5 (3.72) | 101.4 (3.99) | 123.8 (4.87) | 110.2 (4.34) | 88.7 (3.49) | 84.4 (3.32) | 68.5 (2.70) | 63.2 (2.49) | 947.4 (37.30) |
| Average precipitation days (≥ 0.2 mm) | 9.3 | 8.1 | 9.8 | 11.5 | 14.7 | 14.8 | 17.8 | 17.9 | 15.8 | 14.7 | 12.6 | 11.0 | 158.0 |
| Average afternoon relative humidity (%) | 62 | 64 | 63 | 66 | 71 | 72 | 73 | 71 | 69 | 65 | 64 | 62 | 67 |
| Average dew point °C (°F) | 11.6 (52.9) | 12.6 (54.7) | 11.4 (52.5) | 10.0 (50.0) | 8.9 (48.0) | 7.3 (45.1) | 6.8 (44.2) | 6.8 (44.2) | 7.2 (45.0) | 7.7 (45.9) | 9.3 (48.7) | 10.3 (50.5) | 9.2 (48.5) |
| Mean monthly sunshine hours | 254.2 | 217.5 | 192.2 | 159.0 | 127.1 | 120.0 | 127.1 | 139.5 | 159.0 | 210.8 | 219.0 | 232.5 | 2,157.9 |
| Percentage possible sunshine | 56 | 56 | 50 | 48 | 42 | 43 | 43 | 43 | 45 | 51 | 51 | 50 | 48 |
Source: Bureau of Meteorology

== Governance ==
Mayor of Burnie
- Incumbent; Giovanna Simpson since 29 October 2026
- Style: Councillor
- Member of: Burnie City Council
- Formation: 1898
- First holder: Captain William Jones

There are nine councillors that govern the Burnie City Council, each serving four-year terms. Giovanna Simpson was elected mayor of the City of Burnie in 2026. The council oversees Burnie's infrastructure, community services, and local regulations. The council also plays a role in generating arts and supporting infrastructure, such as the Burnie Arts and Function Centre.

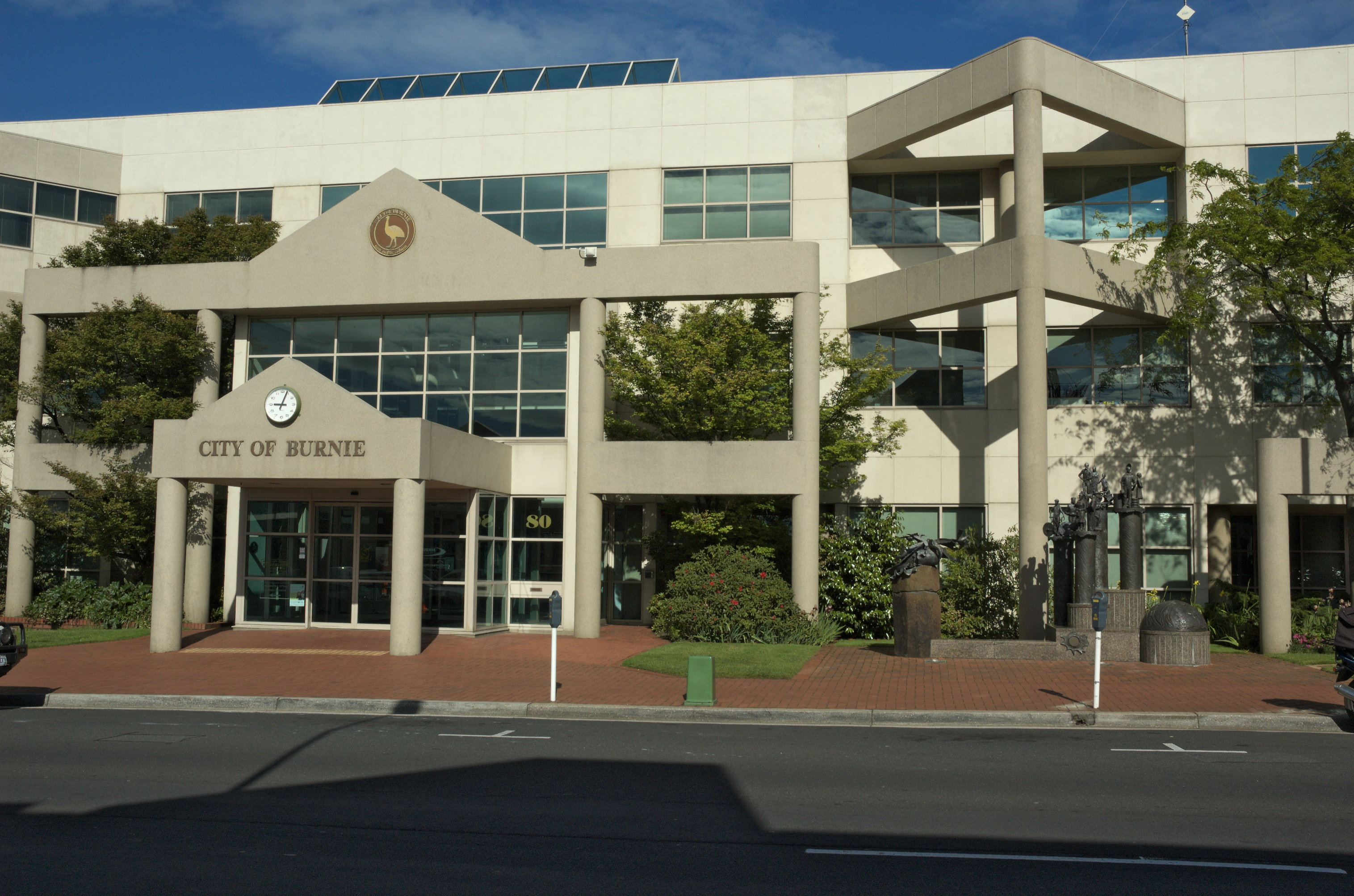
Burnie City Council offices

Burnie’s political landscape is shaped by a mix of conservative and independent influences, reflecting broader trends in Tasmania’s evolving political dynamics. At the state level, Burnie falls within the Tasmanian House of Assembly’s electoral division of Braddon, a multi-member electorate that includes both Labor and Liberal members.

Nationally, Burnie is located in the federal electorate of Braddon, currently represented by Anne Urquhart of the Australian Labor Party. Braddon has traditionally been a marginal seat, with representation often alternating between the Labor and Liberal parties in federal elections.

In the Australian Senate, Tasmania is represented by 12 senators, including Jacqui Lambie, leader and founder of the Jacqui Lambie Network, who resides in Burnie.

== Economy ==
Burnie's economy has long been shaped by heavy manufacturing, forestry, and farming, with the Port of Burnie playing a central role. Historically, the port became the main hub for exporting minerals from Tasmania's west coast after the Emu Bay Railway opened in 1897.

Agriculture, once prominent in the region, declined following the handover of the Surrey Hills and Hampshire Hills lots, paving the way for forestry to become Burnie’s dominant sector in the 20th century. The establishment of the Associated Pulp and Paper Mills (APPM) mill in 1938 marked a turning point, positioning the city as an industrial centre for paper production and woodchip exports. The closure of the APPM in 2010 ended a defining chapter in Burnie’s industrial history, although forestry continues through exports at the Burnie Chip Export Terminal.

From the 1970s Burnie grappled with pollution issues linked to titanium dioxide production, and from the 1990s it underwent significant industrial decline following the closure of major manufacturing plants and its pulp and paper mill. These changes contributed to population loss and long-term unemployment challenges.

=== Renewable energy and diversification ===
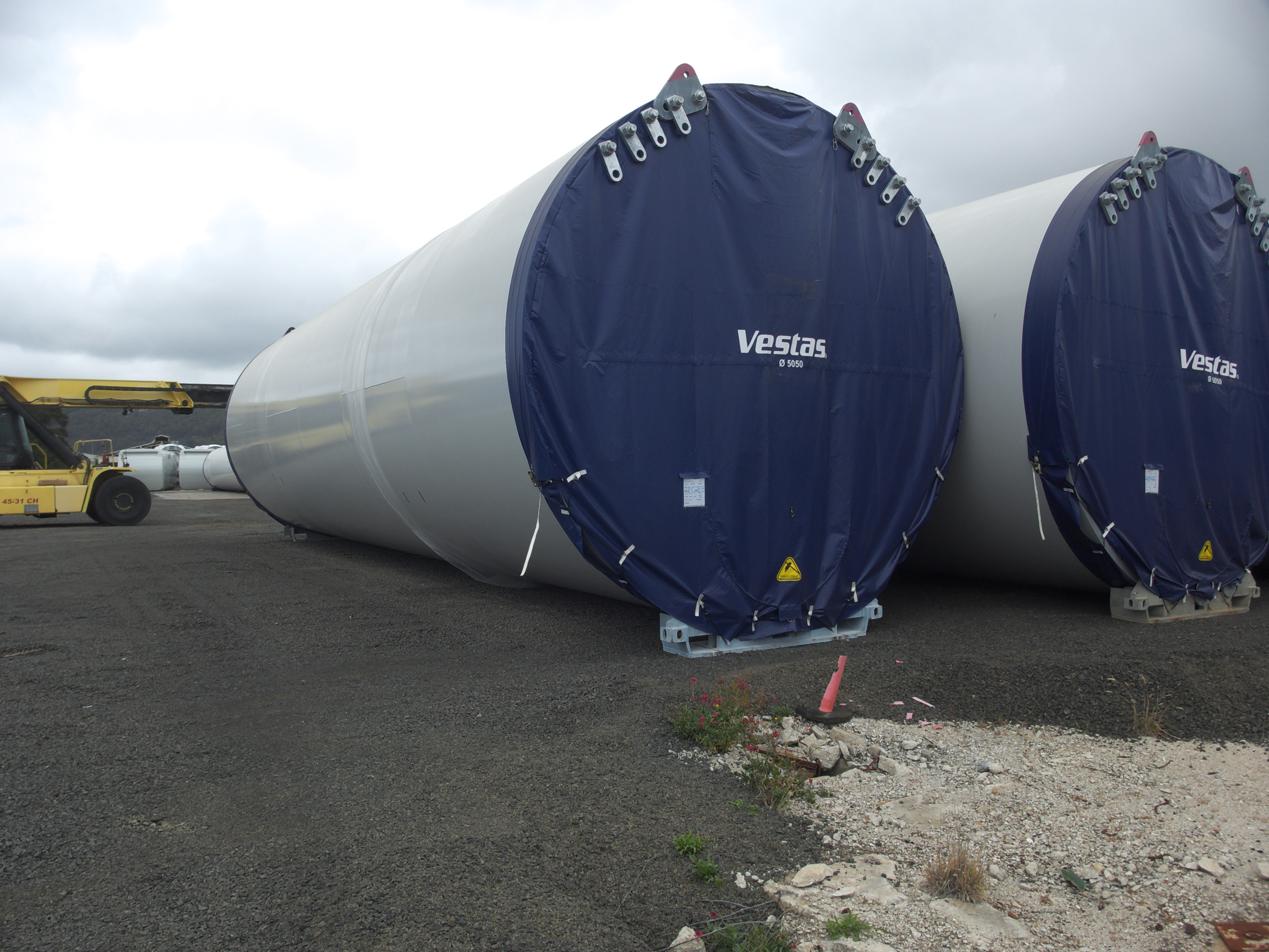
Wind turbine components stored on the grounds of the former paper mill

In the 21st century, Burnie has sought to diversify its economy, with growth in education, healthcare, and logistics. The city has also been identified as a strategic location for renewable energy projects, including proposals associated with the North West Renewable Energy Zone and the planned Marinus Link power cable between Tasmania and Victoria. Proposals under consideration include large-scale wind and solar power developments, as well as a synthetic electrofuel facility.

==== Marinus Link ====
The Marinus Link is a proposed 255-kilometre (158 mi) high voltage direct current submarine power cable intended to connect Heybridge with Waratah Bay, Victoria. Estimated in 2021 at $3.5 billion, the project is designed to transfer electricity generated from renewable sources in Tasmania to the Australian mainland. Associated infrastructure, including the North West Transmission Developments, has been proposed to support the link. Government announcements have suggested the project could create around 1,400 jobs and contribute up to $3 billion in investment, with construction expected to begin in 2026 and finish by 2030.

==== E-fuels facility ====
Burnie has been identified as the proposed site for what is described as Australia’s first commercial-scale e-fuels facility, led by HIF Global. The planned $1 billion development is intended to produce up to 100,000,000 litres (22,000,000 imp gal; 26,000,000 US gal) of synthetic fuels per year using renewable electricity and biomass feedstocks, with applications in aviation, shipping, and heavy transport. Reports indicate the facility could employ around 200 people once operational, with a target commissioning date of 2028.

==== Wind farms ====
Several wind farm projects have been proposed in the region south of Burnie, including the Guildford and Hellyer Wind Farms. If developed, these projects would contribute to Tasmania’s goal of generating 200% of its electricity needs from renewable sources by 2040.

Guildford Wind Farm has been proposed with a capacity ranging from 300 MW, per Environment Protection Authority documents, up to 450 MW, according to developer Ark Energy.

Hellyer Wind Farm proposals similarly cite a capacity of 300 MW across 48 turbines, although some industry data sources estimate up to 384 MW based on turbine specifications.

== Cultural and educational institutions ==
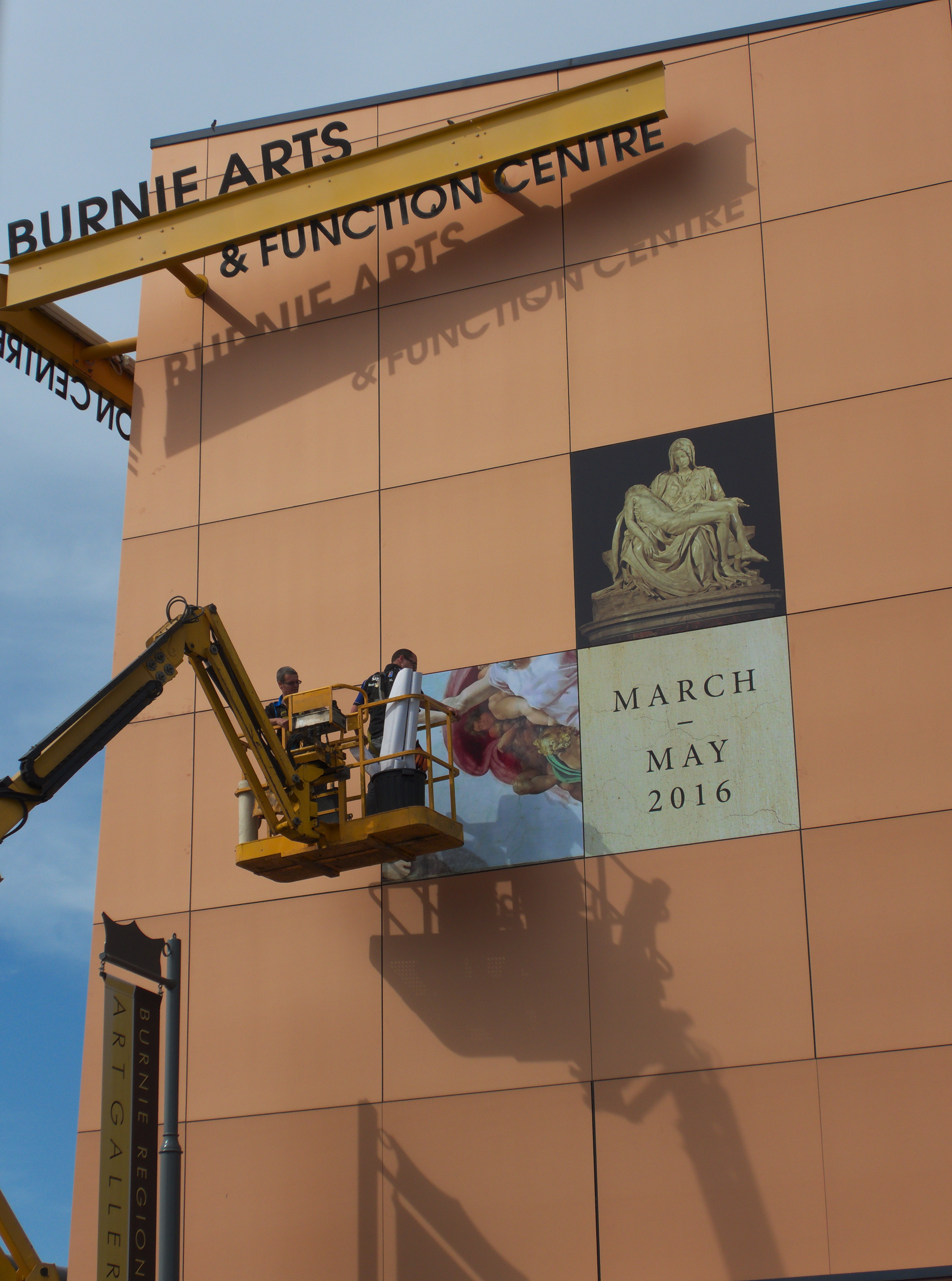
Burnie Arts & Function Centre with signwriters on a cherry picker

Burnie has long been a hub for cultural, educational, and health services in the northwest region of Tasmania. At the heart of its cultural precinct is the Burnie Arts & Function Centre, which replaced the old Burnie Theatre in 1965. Originally known as the Civic Centre, this multi-functional venue is an important space for the community, hosting performances, events, and exhibitions that attract visitors from across the region. The centre is also home to one of Australia's largest regional art galleries, which opened in 1978, and the Burnie Regional Museum, designed by architects Leith and Bartlett, which houses the historic Federation Street—the first indoor streetscape of its kind in the country.

In 2021, plans for a new $18m North West Museum and Art Gallery, designed by Terrior Architects, were abandoned. Instead, the focus shifted toward enhancing and consolidating the region’s existing cultural facilities.

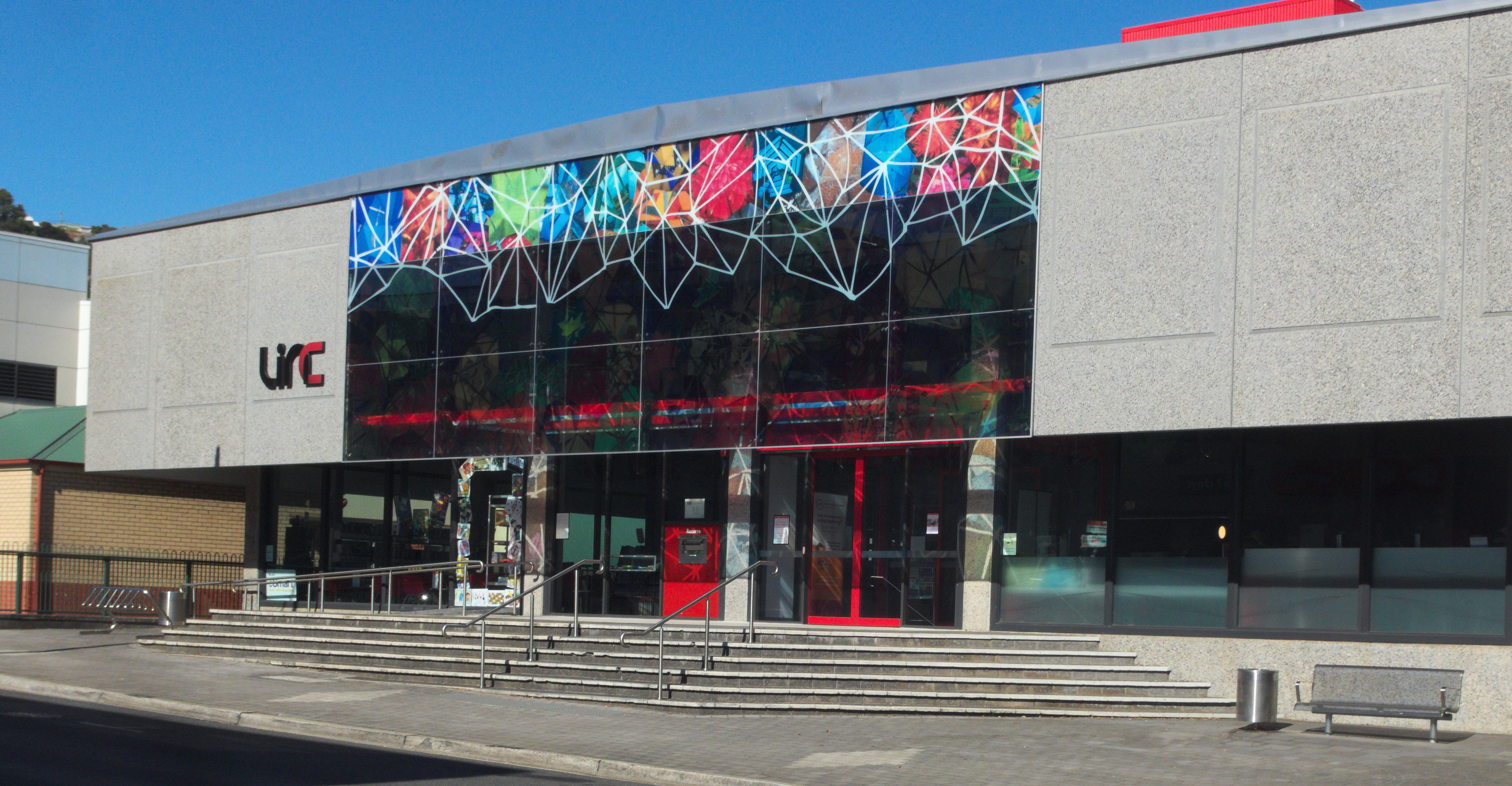
Burnie Library, c. 2018

The Burnie Library (formerly known as the Hellyer Regional Library) is part of the Libraries Tasmania network, serving as a major community resource, offering public access to books, digital resources, and research materials. The library also plays an important role in Burnie’s educational and cultural landscape, providing services for children, secondary education, technical college and other tertiary students. In late 2024, during the temporary closure of the Burnie Library, a pop-up library was operated within the Burnie Regional Museum to continue providing services to the community. This temporary arrangement highlighted the collaborative efforts between cultural institutions in Burnie.

In addition to these cultural landmarks, Burnie provides essential health services through the North West Regional Hospital, located on Brickport Road. As the third-largest hospital in Tasmania, it offers a range of in-patient and out-patient services, including general medicine, surgery, orthopaedics, psychiatry, and paediatrics, playing a vital role in the well-being of the wider community.

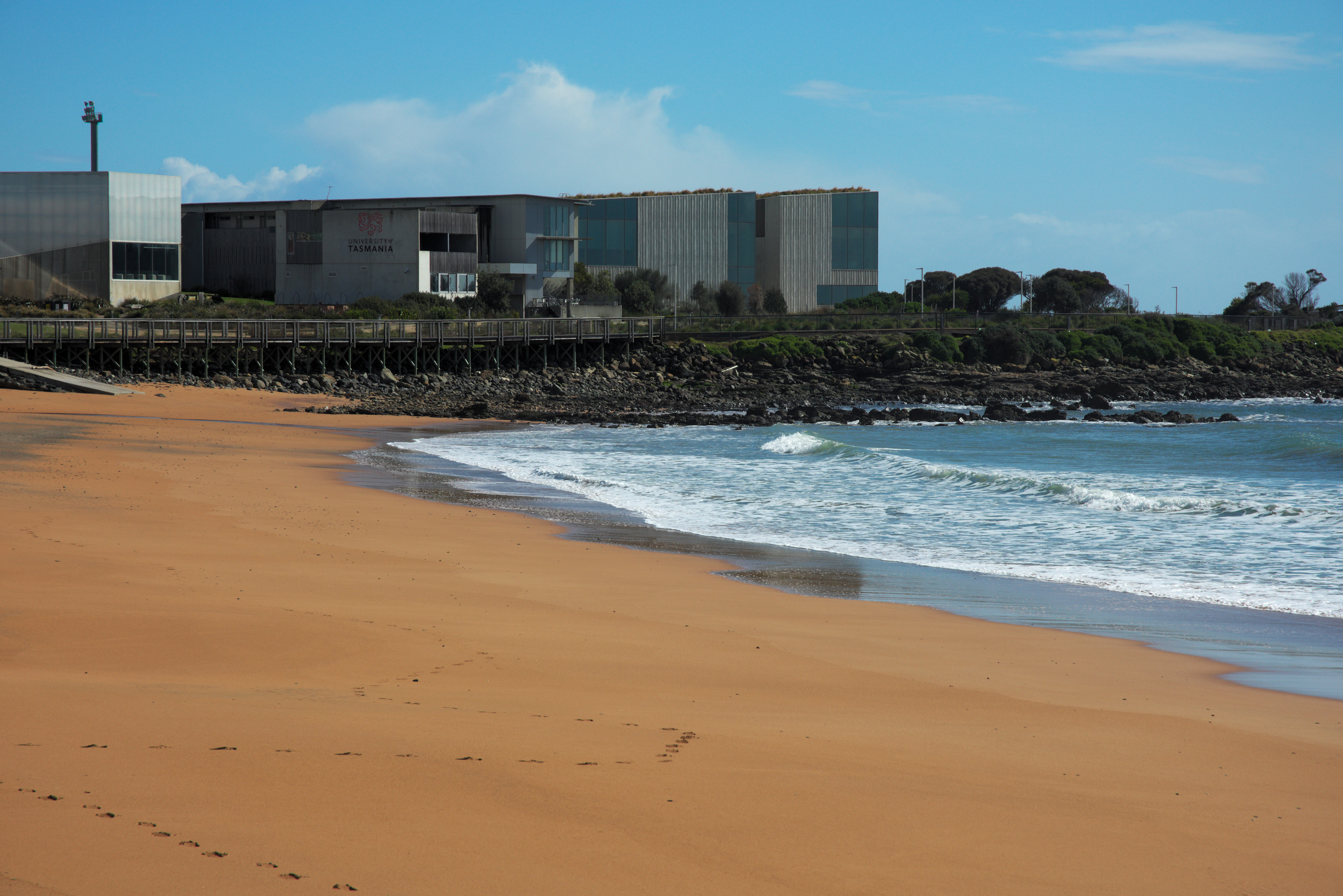
West Beach and University of Tasmania Cradle Coast Campus building

Burnie is also home to educational institutions, including the Cradle Coast campus of the University of Tasmania (UTAS), where the Cuthbertson Research Laboratories are part of the Tasmanian Institute of Agricultural Research. The town also hosts campuses for the Tasmanian Polytechnic and Tasmanian Academy, ensuring a range of learning opportunities for students in the region. Alongside these, Burnie boasts numerous sporting and social organisations that contribute to the vibrant community life.

== Transport ==
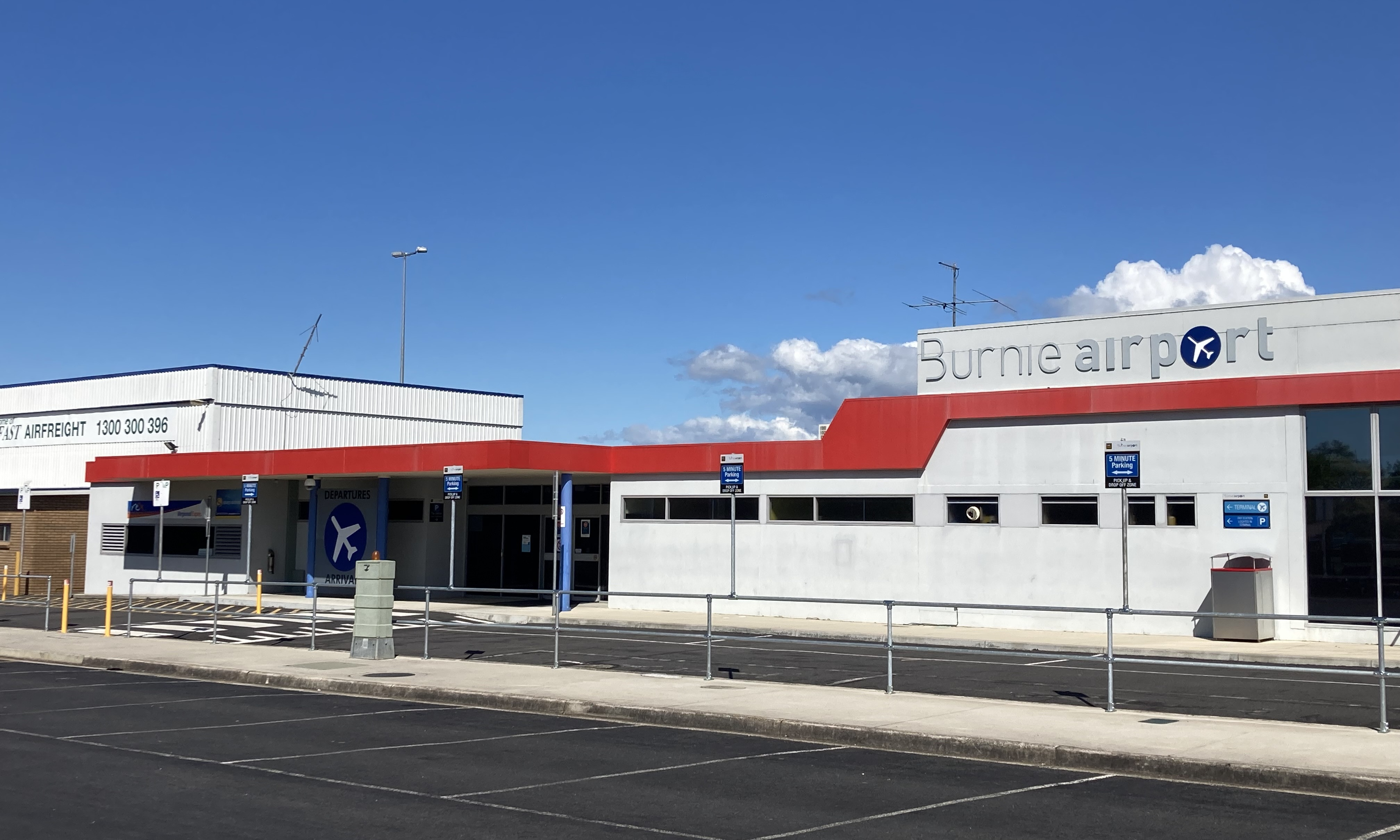
Burnie Airport, c. 2022

Burnie Airport is located in the adjacent town of Wynyard, a 20-minute drive from the central business district.

Burnie Port, operated by TasPorts, is Tasmania's largest general cargo port. It is the nearest Tasmanian port to Melbourne and Mainland Australia. The 1969 built shiploader was upgraded in 2024 doubling the ports capacity.

Burnie is served by TasRail services on the Melba and Western lines, Burnie was previously the terminus of the former Emu Bay Railway. Burnie had passenger rail services including the Tasman Limited until the mid-1970s. The rise of road transport and declining demand led to the discontinuation of passenger services.

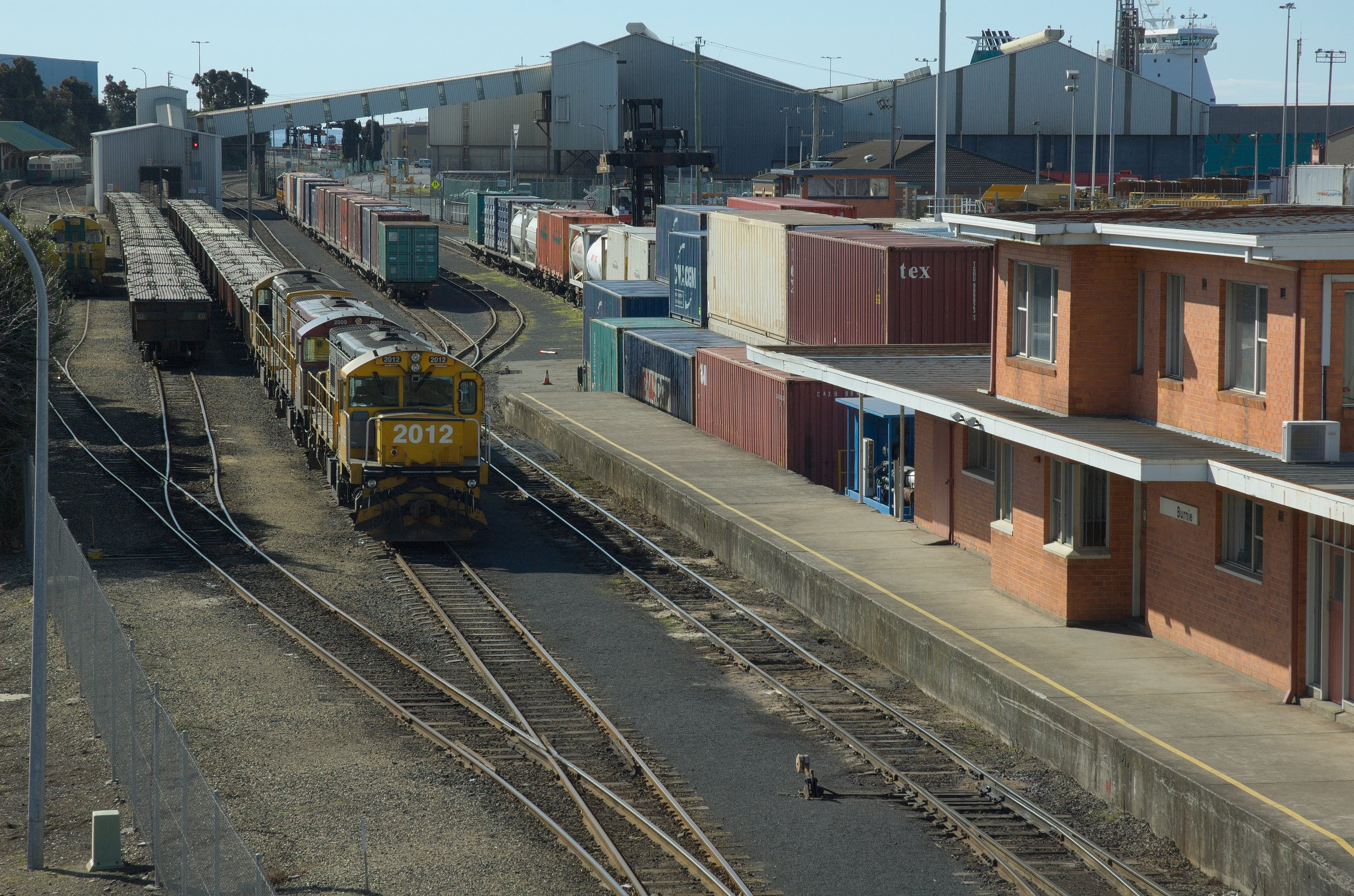
Port of Burnie rail depot, c. 2012

Burnie is connected with Devonport via the four-lane Bass Highway and a rail link used for freight purposes. Burnie is also connected to the West Coast by the Murchison Highway.

Metro Tasmania operate local bus services around the city and its suburbs. Kinetic Tasmania operate a service to Smithton. Tassielink Transit operate services to Strahan.

== Coastal pathway ==
In October 2024, a 13 kilometre coastal pathway between Burnie and Wynyard on the former Western railway line opened.

== Suburbs ==
The city of Burnie consists of a number of small suburbs including Parklands, Park Grove, Shorewell Park, Acton, Montello, Hillcrest, Terrylands, Upper Burnie, Romaine, Havenview, Emu Heights, South Burnie and Wivenhoe.

== Sport ==
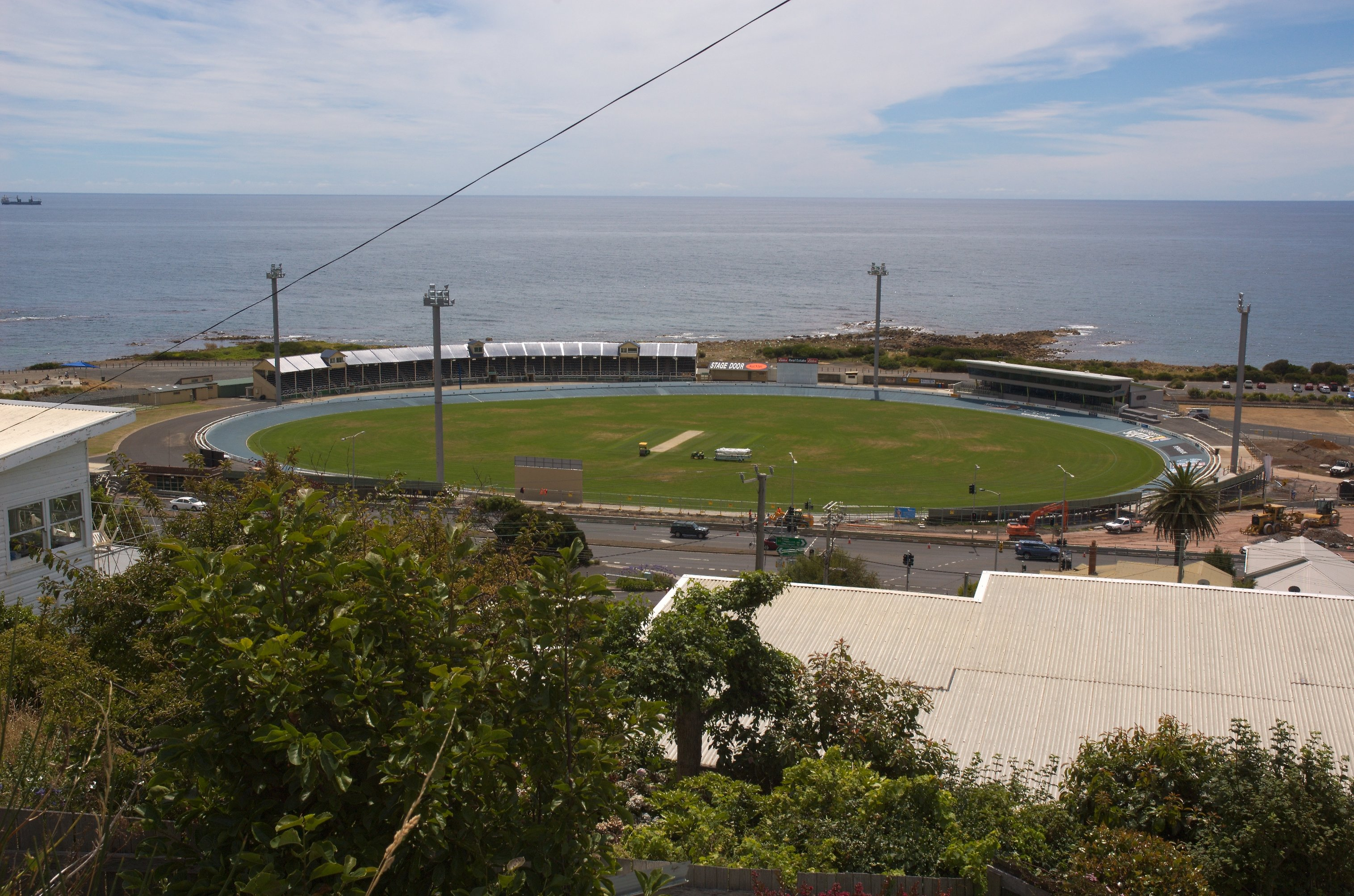
West Park Oval, c. 2012

Australian rules football is popular in Burnie. The city's team is the Burnie Dockers Football Club in the North West Football League. Their ground is West Park Oval.

Cricket is also a popular sport in Burnie. The city’s team is the Burnie Hurricanes Cricket Club who compete in the Cricket North West and Cricket North competitions. Their ground is West Park Oval

Rugby union is also played in Burnie. The local club is the Burnie Rugby Union Club. They are the current Tasmanian Rugby Union Statewide Division Two Premiers and were promoted to the Statewide First Division for the 2008 season.

Soccer is also represented in Burnie, with Burnie United FC having four teams compete in the northern premier league; the women's team, under 18 team, reserve team and division one team. They also have youth sides in the under 14 and under 16 competitions. Their ground is located in Montello, Tasmania.

Burnie hosts an ATP Challenger Tour tennis event, the Burnie International, during the week following the Australian Open.

Athletics events include the annual Burnie Gift and Burnie Ten.

Archery is also represented in Burnie, with Burnie Bowmen Archery Club. They were founded in 1958 and have influenced the development of archery along the northwest coast of Tasmania. Its first target championship was held in 1959. In 1972 Burnie Bowmen Archery Club was given the honor of holding the first national championships to be held outside of a capital city. In 2017 Burnie Bowmen Archery club hosted Archery for the XVI Australian Masters Games. In 2020 and 2021 they were to host the National Youth Archery Championships and National Archery Championships, but due to COVID-19 these events were cancelled. Presently, Target and Clout shoots are conducted at Parklands High School Oval in Romaine, Burnie. Indoor is conducted at the Upper Burnie Memorial Hall. Field is conducted at the Blythe Scout Camp at Heybridge.

== Media ==
The Advocate newspaper was established in 1890 servicing the North West region. The mailroom is located in Burnie whilst the local press operations ceased in mid-2008 and were relocated to Launceston.

Burnie has access to ABC, SBS, WIN, Seven, and 10 stations as well as all new free to air television stations.

There are two commercial radio stations, 7BU at 100.9 MHz on the FM band and Sea FM on 101.7 on the FM band. Many Melbourne radio stations can be received in Burnie.

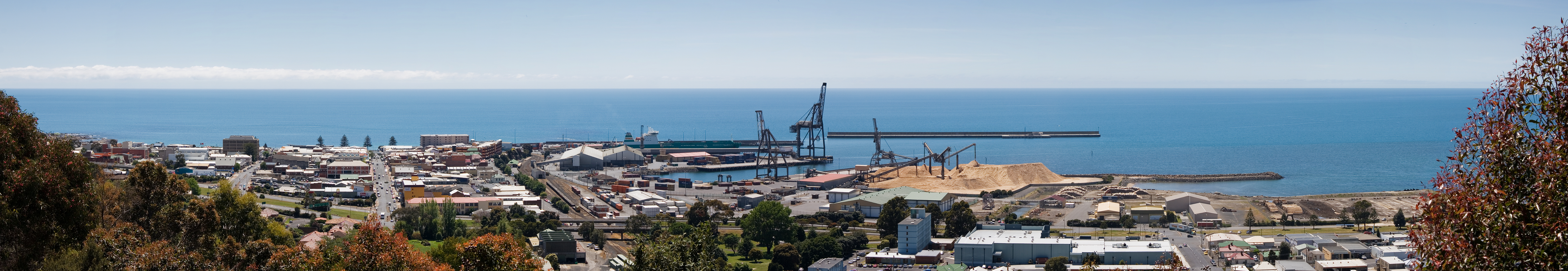
Burnie CBD and Port from Wilfred Campbell Memorial Reserve

== Notable residents ==
=== Arts ===
- Zima Anderson – actor best known for portraying Roxy Willis in Neighbours.
- Josh Earl – comedian, writer and presenter; host of the 2014 revival of Spicks and Specks.
- Hannah Gadsby – comedian, writer and performer known for stand-up specials including Nanette, Douglas and Something Special.
- Justin Heazlewood – musician, writer and performer who works under the stage name The Bedroom Philosopher.
- Jon Kudelka (1972–2026) – political cartoonist for publications including The Australian and The Saturday Paper.
- Jean Stafford OAM – country music singer who lived in Burnie during the 1960s and early 1970s, early in her recording career; members of her family continue to live in the region.

=== Other ===
- Cameron Baird VC MG (1981–2013) – Australian Army soldier posthumously awarded the Victoria Cross for Australia for actions during operations in Afghanistan.
- Dale Elphinstone AO FTSE – industrialist and founder of the Elphinstone Group; identified as Tasmania’s wealthiest person in 2019.

=== Politicians ===
- Ruth Forrest – member of the Tasmanian Legislative Council
- Jacqui Lambie – Senator for Tasmania and founder of the Jacqui Lambie Network.
- Vicki O'Halloran – social advocate and former Administrator of the Northern Territory (2017–2023).

=== Sportspeople ===
- Taran Armstrong – professional basketball player and former US college athlete with California Baptist University.
- Jamie Cox – former first-class cricketer for Tasmania and Somerset County Cricket Club; later held administrative roles with Cricket Australia and the Australian Institute of Sport.
- Amy Cure – former professional track cyclist who represented Australia at the 2012 Summer Olympics.
- David Guest – field hockey midfielder and member of the Australian team that won bronze at the 2008 Summer Olympics.
- Eddie Jones – rugby union coach who has led national teams including Australia, England and Japan.
- Matthew Knight – professional basketball player and three-time NBL champion with the Perth Wildcats.
- Marcus Marshall – Australian motor racing driver who has competed in V8 Supercars and international open-wheel categories including the Champ Car World Series.
- Timothy O'Shannessey – former professional track cyclist who won the bronze medal in the Men's team pursuit in the 1996 Summer Olympics.
- Shaun Young – former Australian and Tasmanian cricketer, including one Test appearance for Australia in 1997.

==== VFL/AFL players ====
- Brendon Gale – former AFL player for the Richmond Football Club; later a senior sports administrator and CEO of the Richmond Football Club.
- Alistair Lynch – former player for the Brisbane Lions, 3 time premiership player.
- Brody Mihocek – AFL player for the Collingwood Football Club.
- Luke Shackleton – former player for Collingwood Football Club and the Tasmanian Devils.
- Eli Templeton – former AFL player for the St Kilda Football Club.
- Lachie Weller – AFL player for the Gold Coast Suns and formerly the Fremantle Football Club.
- Maverick Weller – former AFL player for the Gold Coast Suns and St Kilda Football Club.

== Sources ==
- Burnie, Tasmania : deep water port, rich agricultural district, tourist resort, industrial centre. Burnie Chamber of Commerce. 1949. hdl:10536/DRO/DU:30144990.
- Puustinen, J. (2011), Burnie City Heritage Project, Burnie City Council, 8072236 – via National Library of Australia
- Mercer, Peter G. (1965), "55 p. : ill., maps; 25 cm.", Burnie : its history and development, Burnie, nla.obj-3400036864
- Haygarth, Nic (October 2018). "Mining the Van Diemen's Land Company holdings 1851–1899: a case of bad luck and clever adaptation" (PDF). Journal of Australasian Mining History. 16. University of Tasmania: 93–110.
- Stokes, HJW (2023). The Settlement and Development of the Van Diemen's Land Company's grants in North-Western Van Diemen's Land, 1824-1860. University of Tasmania (Thesis). doi:10.25959/23238782.V1.
