= Thomas Flanagan (prospector) =

Irish gold prospector in Australia

- Born: 1 January 1832; Ennis, County Clare, Ireland
- Died: 16 November 1899 (aged 67 years 10 months); Bendigo, Victoria, Australia

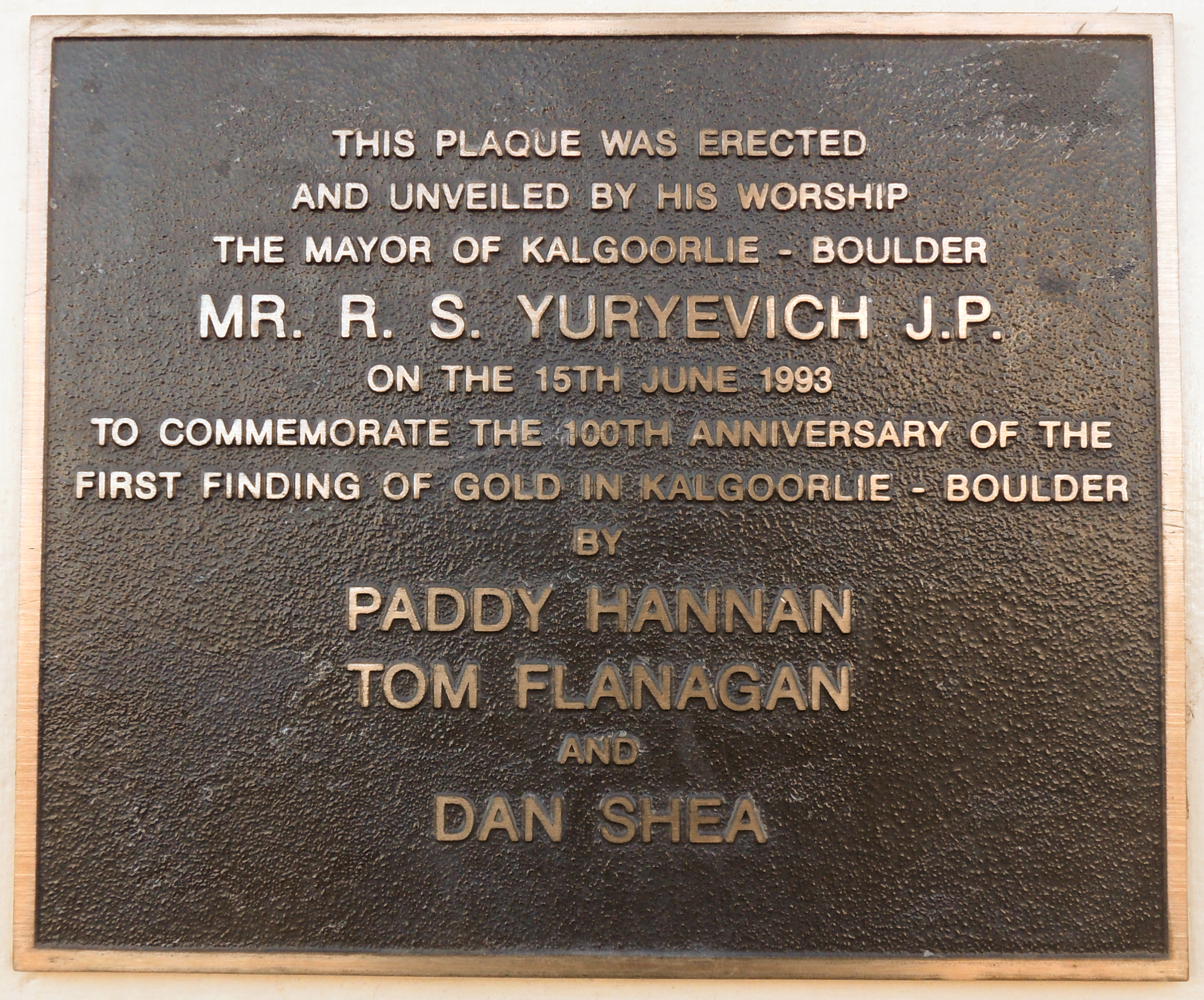
The Centenerary Plaque of 1993, on the wall of the Town Hall in Kalgoorlie

Thomas Flanagan (1 January 1832 – 16 November 1899) was a gold prospector who in 1893, together with fellow Irishmen Paddy Hannan and Dan Shea, found the first gold in what became the richest goldfield in Australia, in Kalgoorlie, Western Australia.

== Childhood ==
Flanagan was baptised on 1 January 1832. His parents were Mary Lyons (c.1790-1870) and Michael Flanagan (c.1782-1865) who leased a farm in the district of Clonkerry, County Clare. Thomas was one of at least ten Flanagan children baptised in the parish of Doora Barefield (also known as Doora Kilraghtis). The parish is 3.5 miles (5.6 kilometres) from the town of Ennis.

From 1831 all Irish children received an elementary education in literary and moral subjects, under the regulations of the state-funded National School (Ireland) system. Nevertheless, the Flanagans' childhood must have been bleak, as the Irish famine of 1846-1851 caused the starvation and death of about a million people, and drove another million to leave the country.

== Emigration to Australia ==
The passenger ship "Marco Polo", in service from 1852 to 1867

By contrast with the deprivations of a famine-ravaged Ireland, Australia was enjoying the luxury of numerous Australian gold rushes. One of Flanagan's older brothers, John, set off for Australia in 1858, arriving in Melbourne on the Marco Polo in July. Flanagan followed, docking in Melbourne on the William Kirk in July 1860.

Margaret O’Halloran, also from Ennis, had arrived in Geelong in 1850, on Lady Kennaway. Margaret was recorded in the ship's passenger list as a domestic servant, 18 years old. By 1861 she had married John Flanagan, moved to Bendigo (then known as Sandhurst) and started a family.

Flanagan was with Margaret O'Halloran and her children in Bendigo in 1864, when he had the tragic duty of signing the death certificate of his brother John Flanagan. In his final year (1899) Flanagan would return to lodge with Margaret (by then a widow for the second time), in her house at 26 Howard Street, Quarry Hill, Bendigo.

== Discovery of gold at Kalgoorlie ==
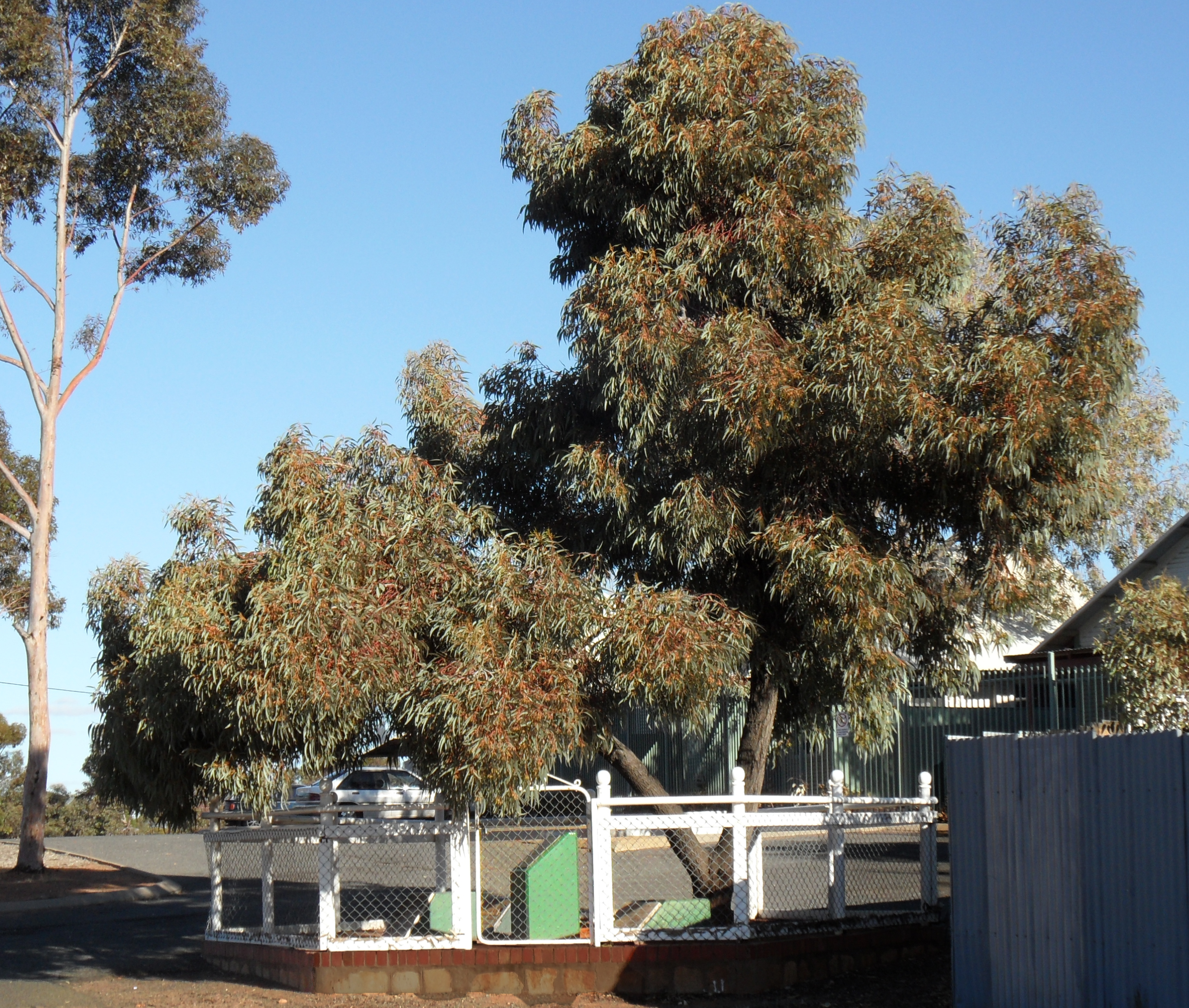
Since 1897 a tree has marked the spot where gold was found on 14 June 1893

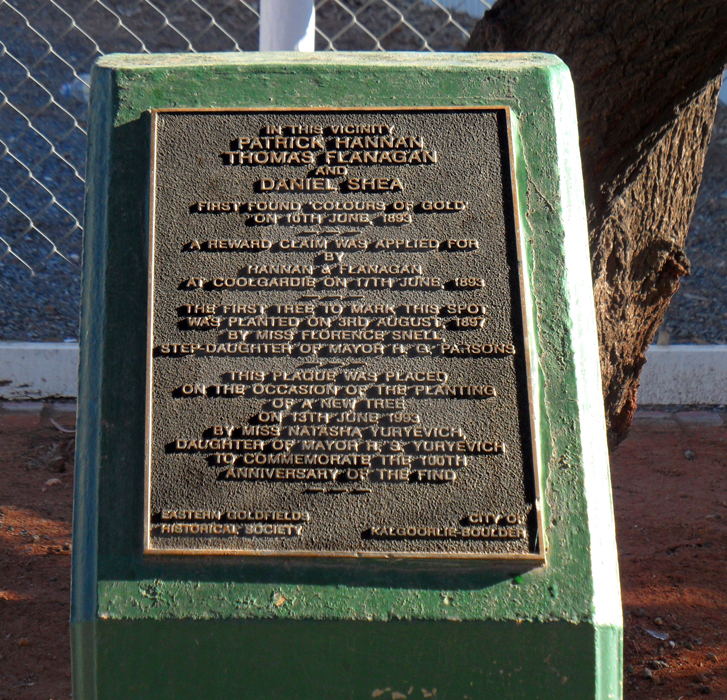
Close up of one of the dedications

Flanagan was like many men in late 19th century Australia, making his living by prospecting in new goldfields as they were discovered. His death certificate shows that he spent a number of years in each of the states of New South Wales, Victoria and Western Australia.

Many reputable Australian historians and biographers have described the 1893 finding of the first gold in Kalgoorlie. Amongst some of the best-known works are those by Martyn and Audrey Webb; Jules Raeside; Tess Thomson and Geoffrey Blainey.

Accounts of the event vary as to who is said to have actually come across the first nuggets. Although the argument became quite heated in certain press reports, it did not cause trouble amongst the partners.

Even Shea, who asserted at the end of his life that he was the original finder, acknowledged Flanagan as the first finder in an interview in 1904 with the Murchison Advocate.

A lively version of the find was told in the Perth Sunday Times in 1909 by another prospector, Fred Dugan, who worked on the claim adjacent to Hannan's at the time. He quoted the words of Flanagan as follows:

I saw gold lying in the sand in a small watercourse. Blood and hounds! I was afraid to pick it up as some of the men might see me from the hill above, so I threw an ould bush on it and went away.'

Inevitably the surface gold at Kalgoorlie ran out after a few months and the majority of the original prospectors moved on, in search of new finds. Flanagan is next officially heard of in Bendigo, in 1899, lodging with his sister-in-law, Margaret O'Halloran.

== Final year ==
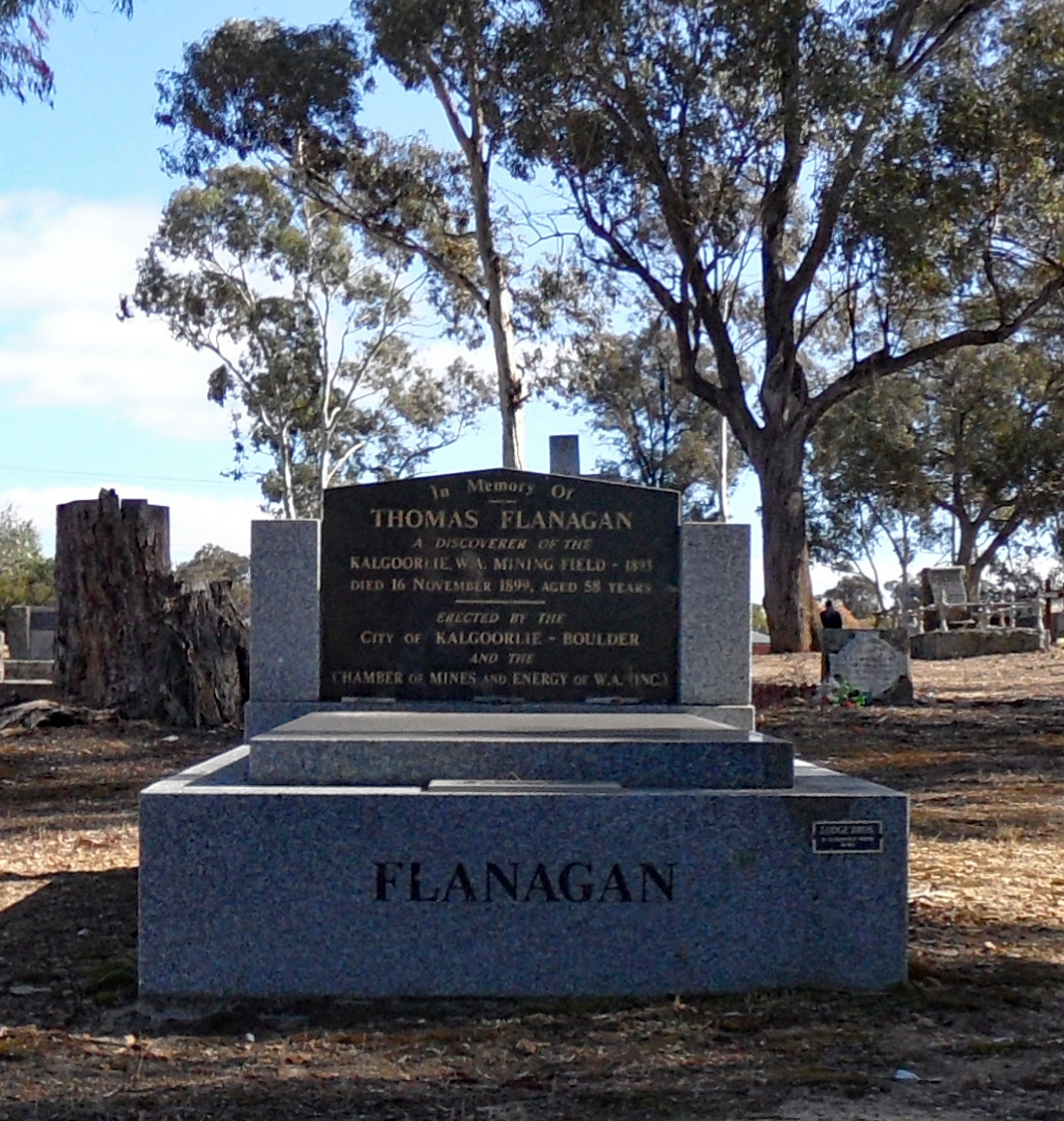
Flanagan's grave no. 13913, Section H5, in the White Hills Cemetery. The incorrect age is a copy of the error on the official death record, understating his age by 10 years

Whilst in Bendigo, in November 1899, Flanagan caught influenza. Many miners, Flanagan among them, suffered from fatally weakened lungs, and he died after a two-week illness. He was buried in the Wiite Hills cemetery, in an unmarked grave, number 13913, in Section H5.

"Miner" and "speculator" are the occupations that are recorded on Flanagan's death certificate and probate documents respectively. At the time these activities alone could provide an adequate income, but not great riches. Although at the time of his death he was assumed to be a pauper, Flanagan’s estate was valued at just under 820 Australian pounds, in 1900. (To put this in perspective, a three-bedroomed house in Bendigo cost around 450 pounds in 1900.)

Since he died unmarried and without leaving a will, the probate administrators decided, in June 1900, that the estate would be shared amongst five people named as his next of kin. The first was the only son of his brother John, namely Michael John Flannigan, the District Surveyor of King Island (Tasmania), after whom Lake Flannigan is named.

The other beneficiaries were said to be living together in Stevens Street, off Halifax Street, Adelaide, South Australia and were named as Michael and John Flannagan, Mary Cahill and Kate Handy. They were probably the children of one of Thomas Flanagan's siblings who went to America. Sand's and McDougall's Street Directory of Adelaide records that the householder of 23 Stevens Street was John Cahill, in 1899 and 1900. No other information has been found to identify these relatives of Thomas Flanagan.

== Acclaim ==
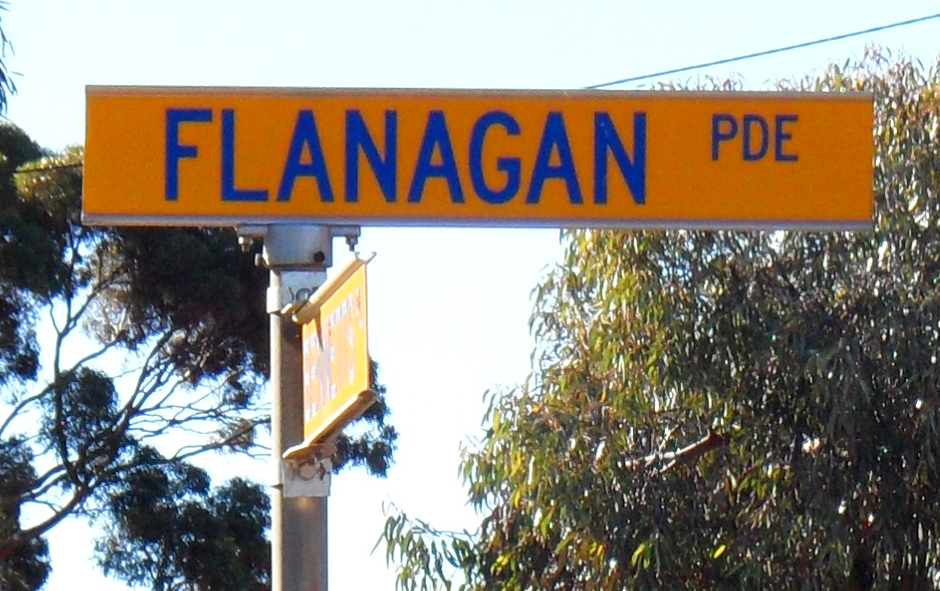
The street in the suburb of Hannans, dedicated to Tom Flanagan in September 1981

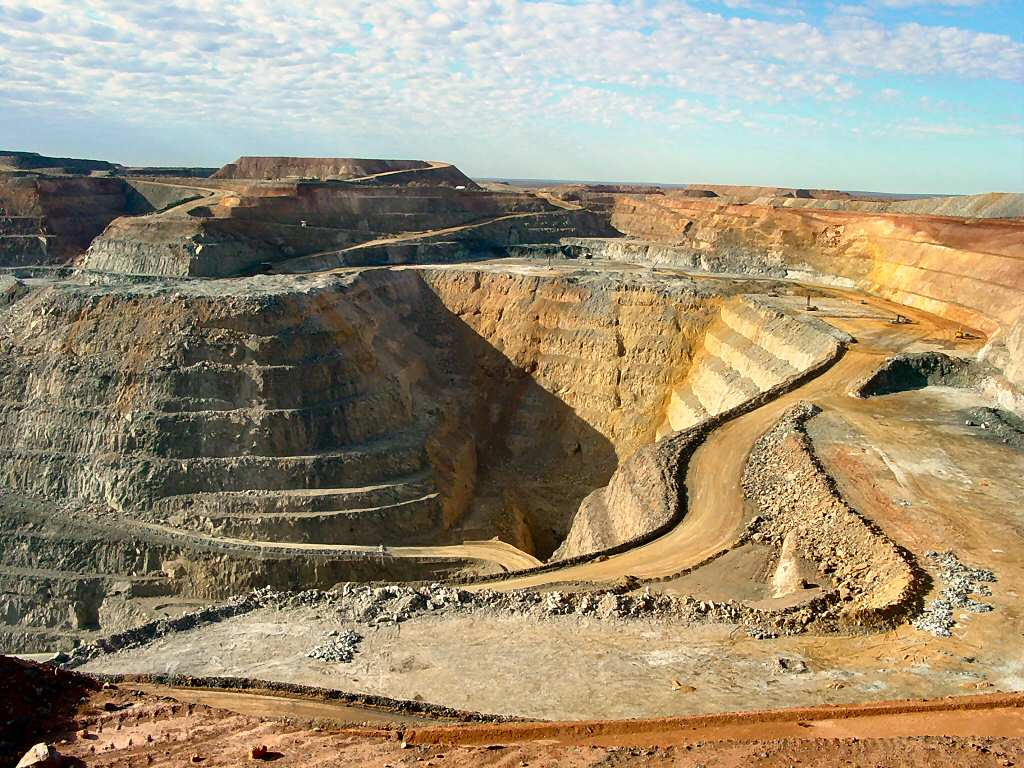
Still mining the gold in Kalgoorlie

Official Western Australian recognition for the prospecting skills of Hannan and partners began to emerge in the year following the find, with the grant of two blocks of land in Kalgoorlie in 1894. Then in 1904 small life pensions were accorded to Hannan and Shea (Flanagan no longer being alive). And thereafter on notable anniversaries of the find (25th, 50th, 100th) official ceremonies and plaques eventuated.

In 1981 the Bendigo Advertiser of Thursday 10 September, page 7, announced the discovery of Thomas Flanagan's unmarked grave in the White Hills Cemetery in Bendigo. Reporter David Horsfall wrote:

The grave was found by namesake, Mr B.J. (Barney) Flanagan, who claims in an article in the Kalgoorlie Miner of August this year [1981] to be no relative, has done extensive research on the origins of the [gold] field. He thinks Flanagan found the first gold, and induced Hannan to stay with him. He researched his subject in the Battye Library in Perth, the Latrobe Library in Melbourne, and the National Library in Canberra ... and in Bendigo.

The same year, 1981, a street in the Kalgoorlie suburb of Hannans was named Flanagan Parade.

In 1993 the citizens of Kalgoorlie-Boulder paid for the restoration of the Bendigo grave, with a smart and durable monument and headstone to mark his burial place in the H5 section of White Hills Cemetery. The headstone replicates an error on the death certificate: Flanagan's age was 67 not 57, as we know now that his baptismal certificate is available. Flanagan's brother, John Flanagan, and his wife and children are all buried together across the cemetery, in section E4, in a family grave created in 1901 at the request of Margaret O'Halloran.

== See also ==
- New South Wales gold rush
- Victorian gold rush
- Traverse, Institute of Surveyors, Issue 308, August 2016]
- Traverse, Institute of Surveyors, Issue 312, April 2017]
- Family tree for Thomas Flannigan in Ancestry.com (membership required)
