= Michael John Flannigan =

Australian surveyor (1862–1901)

- Born: 13 August 1862; Sandhurst, Victoria, Australia
- Died: 21 April 1901 (aged 38); Bendigo, Victoria, Australia
- Occupation(s): 1st District Surveyor, King Island

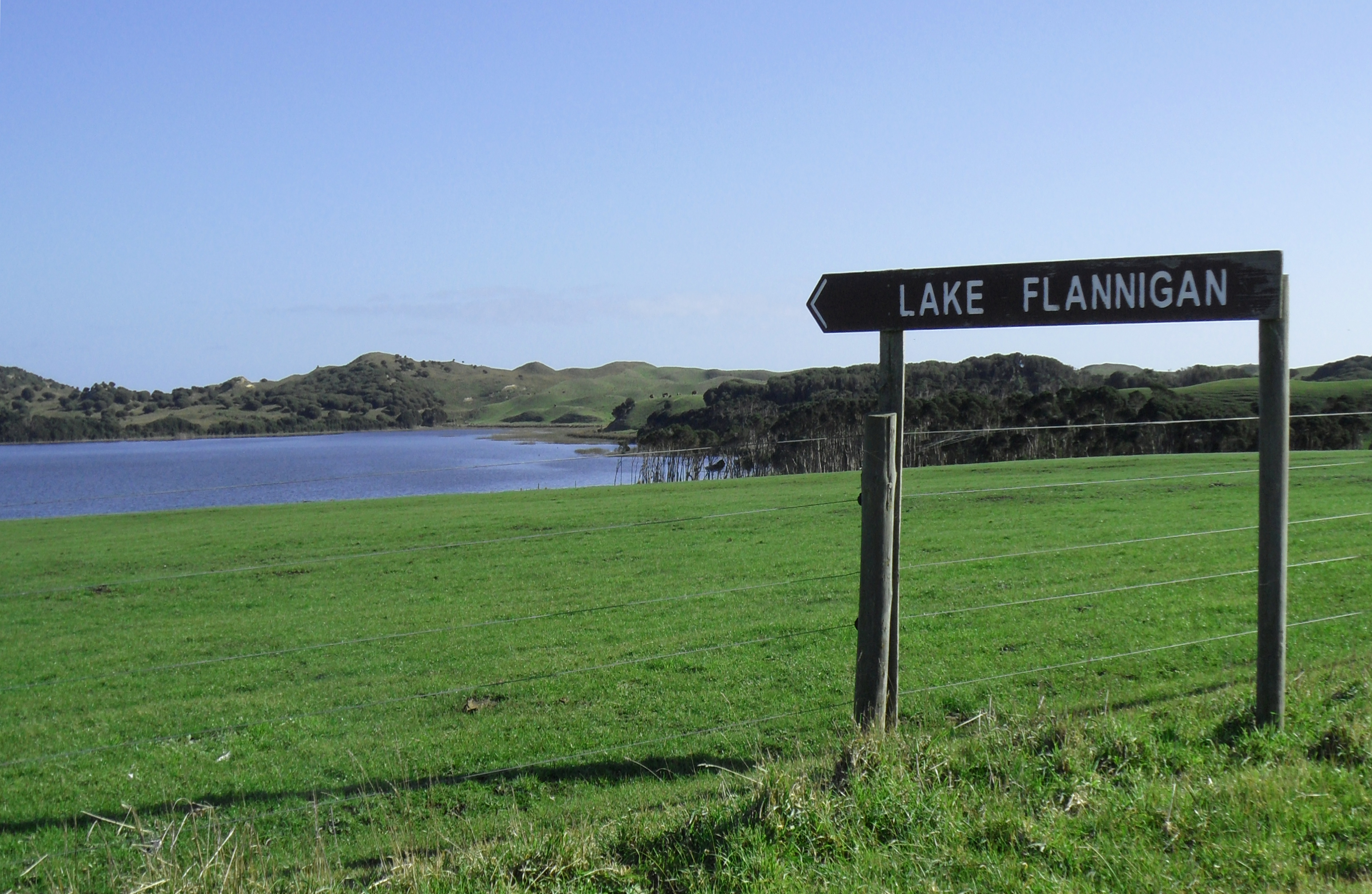
The largest lake on King Island was named after Michael John Flannigan in 1911 or 1912

Michael John Flannigan (13 August 1862 – 21 April 1901) was the first District Surveyor of King Island (Tasmania), Australia. His work was singled out for praise by the Surveyor-General, Albert Edward Counsel, at a time when professional standards for land surveyors were newly defined and often disregarded by practitioners.

In the 1890s King Island topped the league of Tasmanian places being settled for the first time. Even under such pressure and in primitive living and working conditions, Flannigan's survey maps and reports were exemplary. He understood the vegetation and the geology of the land, recommending actions to protect water and other natural resources, such as a reserve around the shore of Big Lake in King Island.

Flannigan's relationship with the settlers was cordial because he paid careful attention to their concerns and needs. And in the Lands office in Hobart, his standing was so good that after his death his colleagues chose to honour his memory by arranging for Big Lake, King Island to be renamed Lake Flannigan, in 1911 or 1912.

It is the largest lake on the island; the length in 1956 was approximately one mile (1.6 kilometres) and in places the width was three-quarters of a mile (1.2 kilometres). In 1913 the Tasmanian Government Gazette officially announced the creation of the reserve fringing the lake, just as he had recommended in 1896.

== Early life ==
Michael John's family name was Flanagan. In adult life he used the form Flannigan. Furthermore, every possible variation of the name appears in official records and newspaper reports about him. The form Flannigan is used for him throughout this article.

In 1862, the year that Flannigan was born in Bendigo, Victoria, the town had already been temporarily renamed Sandhurst (from 1854 to 1891). Being at the centre of a major Victorian gold rush the town consisted mostly of huts and tents. Prospecting was extremely dusty work, permanently damaging to the lungs of 'diggers'. When epidemics such as tuberculosis broke out, many hundreds succumbed. Flannigan's father was among the victims.

=== Flannigan's parents ===
John Flanagan was an older brother of the famous Irish-Australian gold prospector Thomas Flanagan.

Their parents were Mary Lyons (c.1790-1870) and Michael Flanagan (c.1782-1865) who leased a farm in the district of Clonkerry, near the important town of Ennis in County Clare, Ireland. No birth or baptism records have come to light for John, but his Australian death certificate confirms his birthplace and his parentage, and was signed by his brother Thomas Flanagan.

John Flanagan arrived in Melbourne on the Marco Polo in July 1858. Two years later he was to be found in Adelaide, South Australia with his new wife Margaret O'Halloran - or so say the birth certificates of his first two children born in 1861 and 1862. No certificate has been found for their marriage in Adelaide, but there is an official record for 7 April 1861 confirming the marriage of John Flanagan and Margaret O'Halloran in the parish of St. Killian's in Sandhurst. One witness was Patt Lyons, who may have been related to John's mother, Mary Lyons.

Margaret O'Halloran (1832-1916) was the daughter of James O'Halloran and Bridget Brooks, also of Ennis in County Clare. Margaret had arrived in Geelong, Victoria on 25 February 1850, aboard Lady Kennaway. The passenger list describes Margaret as being 18 years old and a domestic servant, going "to her brother". By 1861 she had married John Flanagan, moved to Sandhurst and started a family. Her children were Bridget Flanagan (1861-1867), Michael John Flannigan (1862-1901) and Mary Ellen Flanagan (1864-1865).

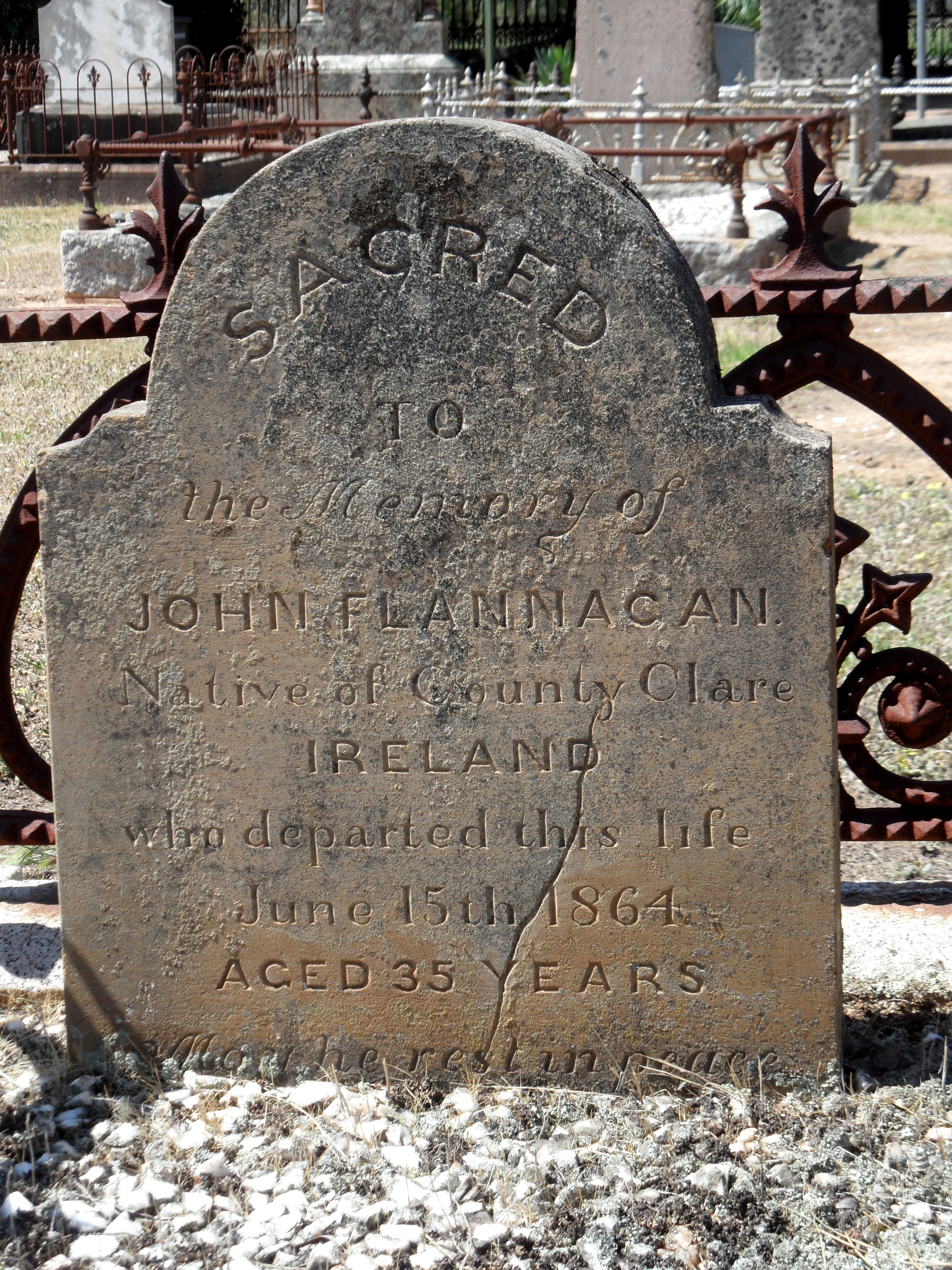
The 1864 sandstone headstone of John Flanagan, at the foot of the larger family grave in Section E4 no.14244 of the White Hills Cemetery, Bendigo

Margaret suffered many losses in her long life. Her husband John Flanagan died of 'phthisis' (tuberculosis) on 15 June 1864; her daughter Mary Ellen died on 20 June 1865, and Bridget died on 25 April 1867. Her second husband, William Higgs, lived until 1898 or 1899, and whilst mourning him Margaret also had to bury her brother-in-law, Thomas Flanagan.

=== Flannigan's childhood ===
Fatherless at two years of age and soon to experience the death of both of his sisters, Flannigan must have known hardship until his seventh year when his mother remarried. The marriage certificate is dated 22 November 1869 in St Paul's Church Sandhurst, and confirms that Margaret's new husband was William Higgs, a bachelor, born in England, working as a miner in Sandhurst. In due course Flannigan had a new half-brother, William Thomas Higgs (1870-1953).

According to the historical council records William Higgs was leasing land with a hut in Reginald Street in 1871, before buying a house in nearby Pyke Street in 1874. Then, in 1881 he bought the house that would be the family homestead for several generations: 26 Howard Street, Quarry Hill, Sandhurst.

The story of the house reveals the kindness of Flannigan towards his mother.

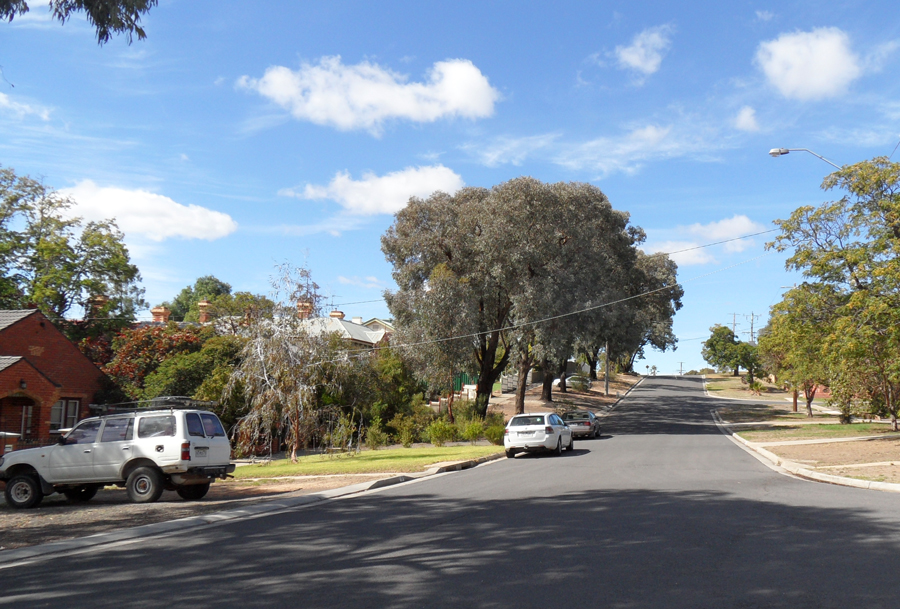
Howard Street, Quarry Hill, Bendigo today, seen from Olinda Street

The historical council rates show that ownership of William Higgs' house had passed to his son, William Thomas Higgs in 1899, but Flannigan then purchased it from his half-brother, enabling his mother to continue to live there, whilst he lived and worked on King Island. In his will dated 14 March 1901, Flannigan bequeathed the house to Margaret O'Halloran for her lifetime, after which he directed that it was to revert to William Thomas Higgs. Higgs' probate documents confirm that the house was still standing in 1954, although it has since been replaced with a brick house. During the 1950s councils all around Australia rationalized their street numbering, and Howard Street numbers were reversed, commencing from Olinda Street instead of Reginald Street.

A description of the house is given in Flannigan's probate document dated June 1901: "A five-roomed weatherboard cottage and outhouse, lath and plaster throughout, an iron roof, verandah. The land has a frontage to Howard Street of sixty feet. Value of land and house 450 pounds. Value of furniture, 46 pounds 7 shillings." In August 1901 most Tasmanian newspapers carried a report of the probate, valuing his estate at 1,283 pounds.

== Professional life ==
The next official mention of Flannigan appears in the Victorian Government Gazette of 25 March 1892, where he is listed as one of 14 newly qualified surveyors. This enabled progress in his career from draughtsman in the Mines Department, Melbourne to government surveyor in the Lands Department, Tasmania. He went to live in Hobart and travelled the country to survey areas for new settlement, including King, Christmas, New Year and Councillor Islands.

He seems to have striven constantly for professionalism: e.g. his membership of the new Tasmanian Institute of Surveyors in Hobart was continuous, with the minutes of their meetings recording his regular payment of the annual fee of two shillings and sixpence.

Flannigan makes a special appearance in the records of the Institute of Surveyors in August 1899. In April of that year he had been promoted to the new position of District Surveyor King Island, and The Surveyor announced the promotion as follows:

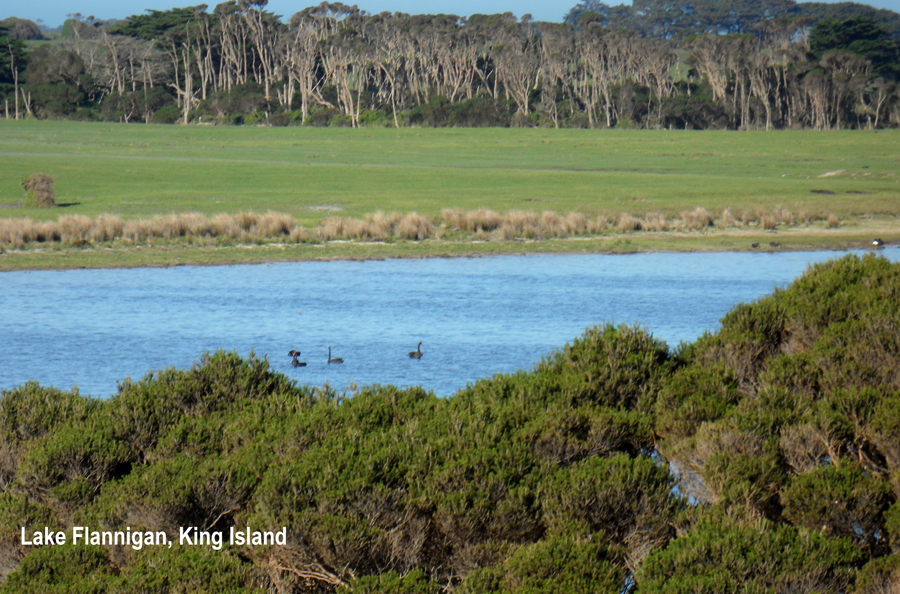

Mr M Flannigan was formerly employed as a Draughtsman in the Mines Department, Melbourne. He also held a similar appointment in the Survey Department Hobart in the years 1892, 1893 and 1894, and it was in the first-mentioned year that he passed his examination in Victoria as a licensed surveyor of that Colony, and was subsequently authorised to make surveys in Tasmania on 7th November 1892. Mr Flannigan has had several years field experience in N.S. Wales and Victoria, and he has the reputation of being a reliable and accurate surveyor.

— The Surveyor, 25 August 1899, p. 292

Today 120 years later, the quality of Flannigan's work has been reaffirmed by a contemporary surveyor working on King Island, who reports that Flannigan's markers are still in place and well-preserved, and, remarkably, only about 40 millimetres different from the measurements made by modern GPS equipment.

He bought two lots of land on the island: 332 acres (134.5 hectares) near Currie Harbour and 29 acres (11.25 hectares) along the Ettrick River, but he did not live to enjoy them. His friend, colleague and executor, William Nevin Tatlow Hurst (a future head of the Lands and Surveys Department) had the sad duty of selling Flannigan's land in 1901 and 1902. There is further evidence of the Flannigan-Hurst friendship. WNT Hurst's mother was Louisa Maria Tatlow Hurst and she wrote her will in 1897, having Michael Flannigan witness the document which is best accessed via the LINC Tasmanian Names Index.

== Final years ==
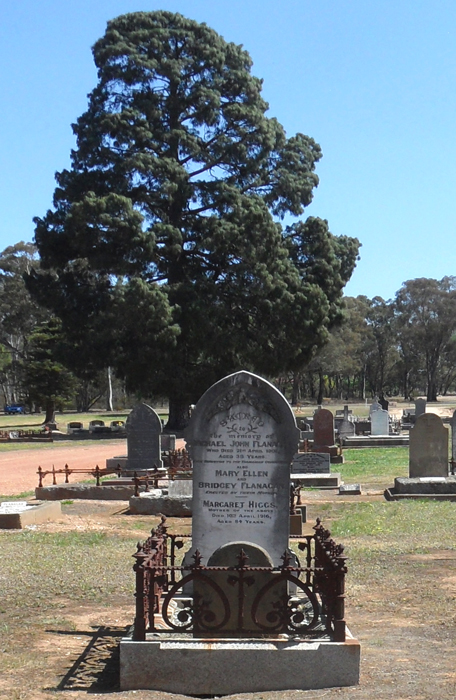
The 1901 Flanagan Family Grave in White Hills Cemetery, Bendigo. John Flanagan's headstone is at the foot, facing the larger headstone

There must have been celebrations early in 1899: the promotion to District Surveyor would have been cause for high hopes, and in April Flannigan's friend William Nevin Hurst was married in Hobart to great fanfare. But, by the end of the year serious problems began to arise for Flannigan. In Bendigo there was the death of his step-father, William Higgs, and of his uncle, Thomas Flanagan, which brought the need to support his mother and shoulder the burden of the administrative work entailed in both men's intestate estates. Travel back to Bendigo was required.

Whilst he was in Bendigo he went to see the family doctor, as recorded on his death certificate. That may have been when he discovered that he had contracted tuberculosis. It was not necessarily a death sentence - only about 5% of people who contract tuberculosis are felled by it.

From Bendigo Flannigan returned to work on King Island, and he made a trip to the Tasmania mainland in May 1900. But by January 1901 his health was failing completely, and he took his final leave of Tasmania.

Flannigan returned to his house and family in Howard Street, Quarry Hill, Bendigo, where he died on 21 April 1901. His mother, Margaret Higgs, commissioned a fine grave and headstone for Michael and his two sisters, and their father John Flanagan, and she would lay there herself in 1916.

Like his uncle, Thomas Flanagan, Michael John died unmarried and so the Flanagan genetic line in Australia died out. Down the years Flannigan's story became diluted and distorted.

The descendants of his half-brother are said to have told Bendigo journalist and historian, David Graham Horsfall (1926-1998), that Flannigan had worked on Flinders Island and had died from the rigour of the surveyor's life. However, now, modern genealogical tools and methods have revealed the true, more remarkable story and achievements of Michael John Flannigan.

== See also ==
- Theodolite
- Surveyor General of Tasmania
- Cape Wickham
- Cape Wickham Lighthouse
- King Island (Tasmania)
- Colony of Tasmania
