= Tatlow =

Tatlow may refer to:

== People ==
- Edward Tatlow, a member of the Derbyshire County Cricket Club in 1873
- Mark Tatlow, artistic director of the Drottningholm Palace Theatre
- Robert Garnett Tatlow (1855–1910), Irish-Canadian businessman
- Richard H. Tatlow III (1906–1993), American civil engineer
- Ruth Tatlow (born 1956; née Ballard), British-Swedish musicologist
- Sarah Alexandra Tatlow, a British politician who stood for the 2017 Lincolnshire County Council election
- Tissington Tatlow, first General Secretary of the Student Christian Movement of Great Britain
- William Nevin Tatlow Hurst (1868–1946), Australian civil servant, Tasmanian Surveyor-General

=== Fictional characters ===
- Steph Tatlow, a character from British TV drama Doctors
- Sgt. William Tatlow, a character from the 1951 film Lost Continent

== Places ==
- Mount Tatlow, a mountain in British Columbia, Canada
- Tatlow Creek, Vancouver, British Columbia, Canada, a buried creek; see Daylighting (streams) § Tatlow Creek
- Tatlow Creek, Squamish, Coastal, British Columbia, Canada; a white water river, and tributary to Ashlu Creek
- Tatlow Lake, source of Tatlow Creek, tributary of Ashlu Creek
- Tatlow, a community in British Columbia, Canada
