= Massoud Amin =

American professor of engineering

Massoud Amin (born July 4, 1961) is a Professor of Electrical and Computer Engineering at the University of Minnesota, Minneapolis, United States. He holds the Honeywell/H.W. Sweatt Chair in Technological Leadership, and is the Director of the Technological Leadership Institute in Twin Cities. He was named Fellow of the Institute of Electrical and Electronics Engineers (IEEE) in 2016 for leadership in smart grids and security of critical infrastructures. He is also a Fellow of the American Society of Mechanical Engineers.

Amin is known as the "father of the smart grid" due to his research and teaching on power grid theory. Amin has published a number of academic papers on improving the reliability, self healing, and cybersecurity of the electric grid. He has worked with government officials to drive policy around making the electric grid more resilient.

== Education and career ==
Amin graduated with a B.S. (cum laude) and M.S. degrees in electrical and computer engineering from the University of Massachusetts Amherst in 1982 and 1985 respectively. During those times, he was a member of the Eta Kappa Nu and Tau Beta Pi Engineering Honor Societies. He then obtained his M.S. and D.Sc. degrees in systems science and mathematics from Washington University in St. Louis, Missouri on 1986 and 1990 respectively. From 2001 to 2007, Amin was a member of the Board on Infrastructure and Constructed Environment at the National Academy of Engineering and a in 2006 served as Chairman of the Scientific Advisory Committee of the Computational Sciences & Engineering Division at the Oak Ridge National Laboratory. Following it, he joined the Board on Mathematical Sciences and Their Applications, serving as such until 2009. From 2010 to 2012, he served as a chairman of the advisory board of the Instrumentation, Control & Intelligent Systems of Idaho National Laboratory.

In 2003, Amin was named Director of the University of Minnesota's Center for the Development of Technological Leadership, now known as the Technological Leadership Institute.
