= Lake Flannigan =

Lake in Tasmania, Australia

- Big Lake (1886–1911)
- Location in Tasmania
- Location: King Island, Tasmania
- Coordinates: 39°37′05″S 143°57′25″E
- Etymology: Michael John Flannigan
- Basin countries: Australia
- Max. length: 2 km (1.2 mi)
- Max. width: 1.5 km (0.93 mi)
- Surface area: 150 ha (370 acres)

Lake Flannigan is a natural freshwater lake on King Island, Tasmania, Australia, situated four kilometres (two point five miles) south of the Cape Wickham Lighthouse, in the northern locality of Wickham.

At approximately 150 hectares (370 acres), it is the largest body of water on King Island. The size of the lake fluctuates significantly. In times of sustained high rainfall the length can reach almost 2 kilometres (1.2 mi), and its width in some parts can be up to 1.5 kilometres (0.93 mi).

The floor of the lake lies 15.25 metres (50.0 ft) AHD. Reports of the depth of the water vary widely from 9.1 metres (30 ft) in 1887 to 2 metres (6 ft 7 in) in 2007 after a period of severe drought coupled with the previous mis-direction of drainage into the lake.

The lake is visible from Springs Road to the south, and Cape Wickham Road to the east.

== Classification ==
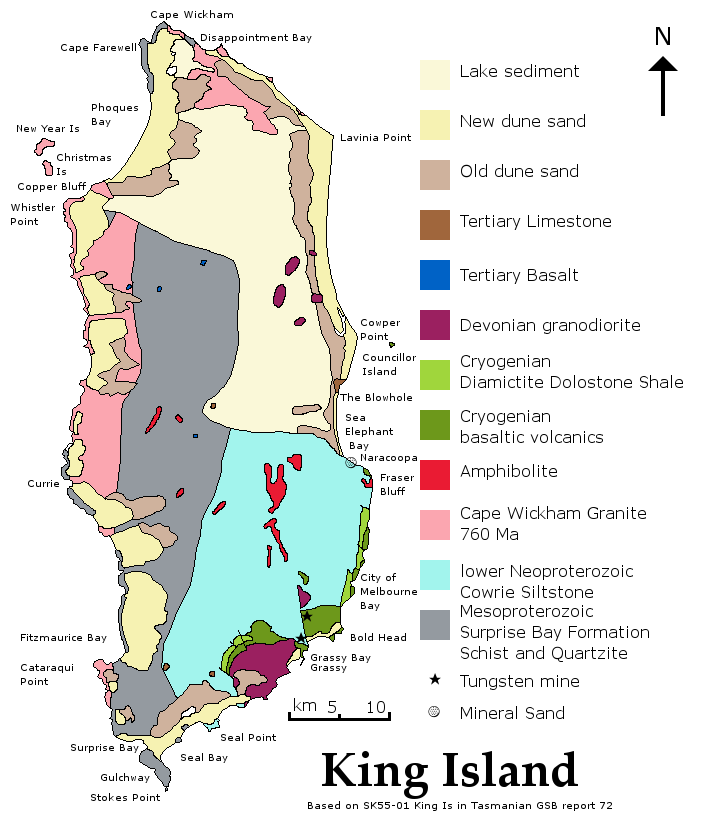
The geology of King Island determines the water levels in Lake Flannigan

The lake is surrounded by private farmland but is itself Crown land; part of its south eastern shore is classified as "Public Reserve".

Jennings explains that geologically the lake is classed as "a complex dune barrage lake" (Jennings, 1957, p. 62). The water in the lake drains underground to The Springs, 1.3 kilometres (0.8 miles) to the west on the coast. Water levels in the lake are affected by its complex geology, including calcareous and quartz sands, granite hills and dune formations. Natural processes, such as waves on the lake and storm winds contribute to erosion, which in turn impacts water levels.

Since Michael John Flannigan wrote his first survey report about the island in 1896, the lake has been acknowledged as being in need of some degree of government protection. Flannigan foresaw that "if the frontages of these lakes [Bob and Egg Lagoons and Big Lake] are blocked by settlers it will be detrimental to the balance of the country" (Flannigan, 1896, page 4).

The lake shores were first gazetted as a reserve in 1913, when the Tasmanian Government Gazette officially announced the creation of a sanctuary for wild fowl fringing the lake. But in July 1921 the King Island News published a letter from the government surveyor, KM Harrisson, expressing his concern that the Tasmanian Animals' and Birds' Protection Act 1919 would remove the previously gazetted sanctuary. However, he may have been misinformed, since the shores of the lake were protected under the Lands Act of 1911, and not under the Game Protection Act, 1907 or its successor the Animals' and Birds' Protection Act, 1919, which dealt with species not places.

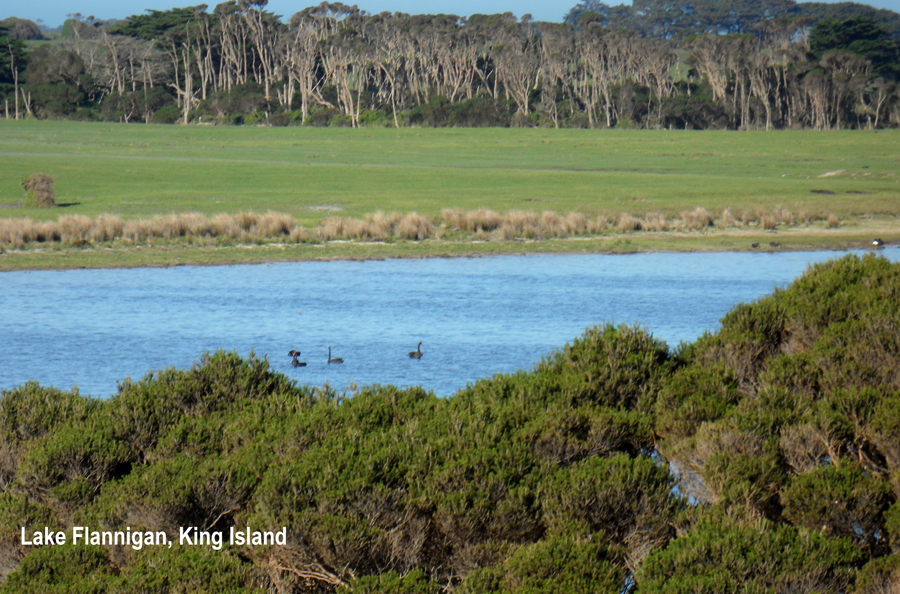
Black swans (Cygnus atratus) on Lake Flannigan, seen from the western dunes

In 2005 a Crown Land Assessment and Classification (CLAC) Project report advised that although there was scope for re-classification as a Nature Reserve under the Nature Conservation Act 2002:

It is recommended that the reserve not be proclaimed until, where there is no practical alternative, any necessary and suitable access points or arrangements, and impact protection measures to allow for stock watering have been identified. (CLAC Project Consultation Report and Recommendations, p. 9)

The King Island Biodiversity Management Plan 2012–2022 identified Lake Flannigan as habitat for the Orange-bellied Parrot (Neophema chrysogaster), which uses the area each year as a stop-over en route to Victoria, from mid-March to June and again briefly in September when returning.

== Nomenclature ==
The Companion to Tasmanian History summarises the evolution of the official naming of places in Tasmania. It reveals that: "Until 1956 place names were applied by walking clubs and government bodies such as Mines Department, Hydro-Electric Commission and the Surveys Office. These names were loosely controlled by the Surveys Office with municipal councils responsible for street, road and park names within township boundaries."

The lake has had several names, including Big Lake, Lake Dobson and Lake Flannigan.

=== Big Lake ===
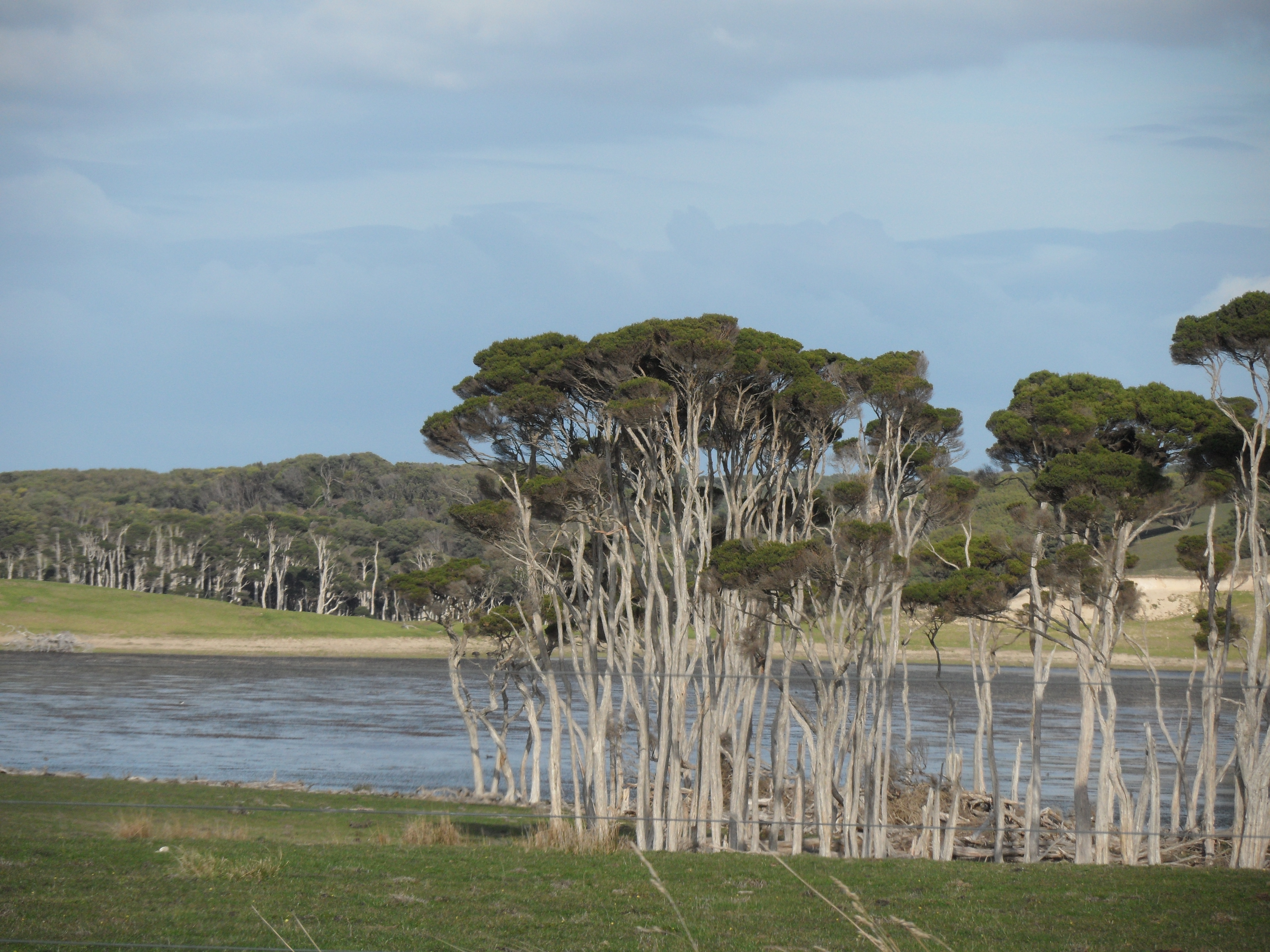
Lake Flannigan in winter sunshine, fringed by swamp paperbark trees, often called tea-tree or ti-tree (Melaleuca ericifolia)

The present Lake Flannigan was originally called Big Lake by the islanders. A scientific group, the Field Naturalists Club of Victoria, conducted an extensive field trip to the island in 1887, and published many reports about it for the next 2 years. During the trip they recorded that:

To the south of Wickham lies a large lagoon, hitherto known only by the name of the big lagoon. This we renamed Lake Dobson, in honour of Dr. Dobson, to whom the exploration party was much indebted for valuable assistance in various ways.

The reference to Dr. Dobson is the Victorian politician, Frank Dobson who, in 1884, was president of the Field Naturalists Club of Victoria.

The Field Naturalists must have failed to notify or convince the islanders or the Lands Department in Hobart of their new name for the lake, because the name Big Lake continued in use until 1911, as can be seen on the official Lands Department map of King Island drawn in that year. On the 1911 map, the name Lake Flannigan is written over the original name of the lake, which has been erased. This was customary professional practice at the time – lithographs of maps had to do many years of service and were overwritten many times with updates, until it was deemed necessary to start afresh with a new map. Thus it appears that the lake was still known as Big Lake in 1911.

=== Lake Dobson ===
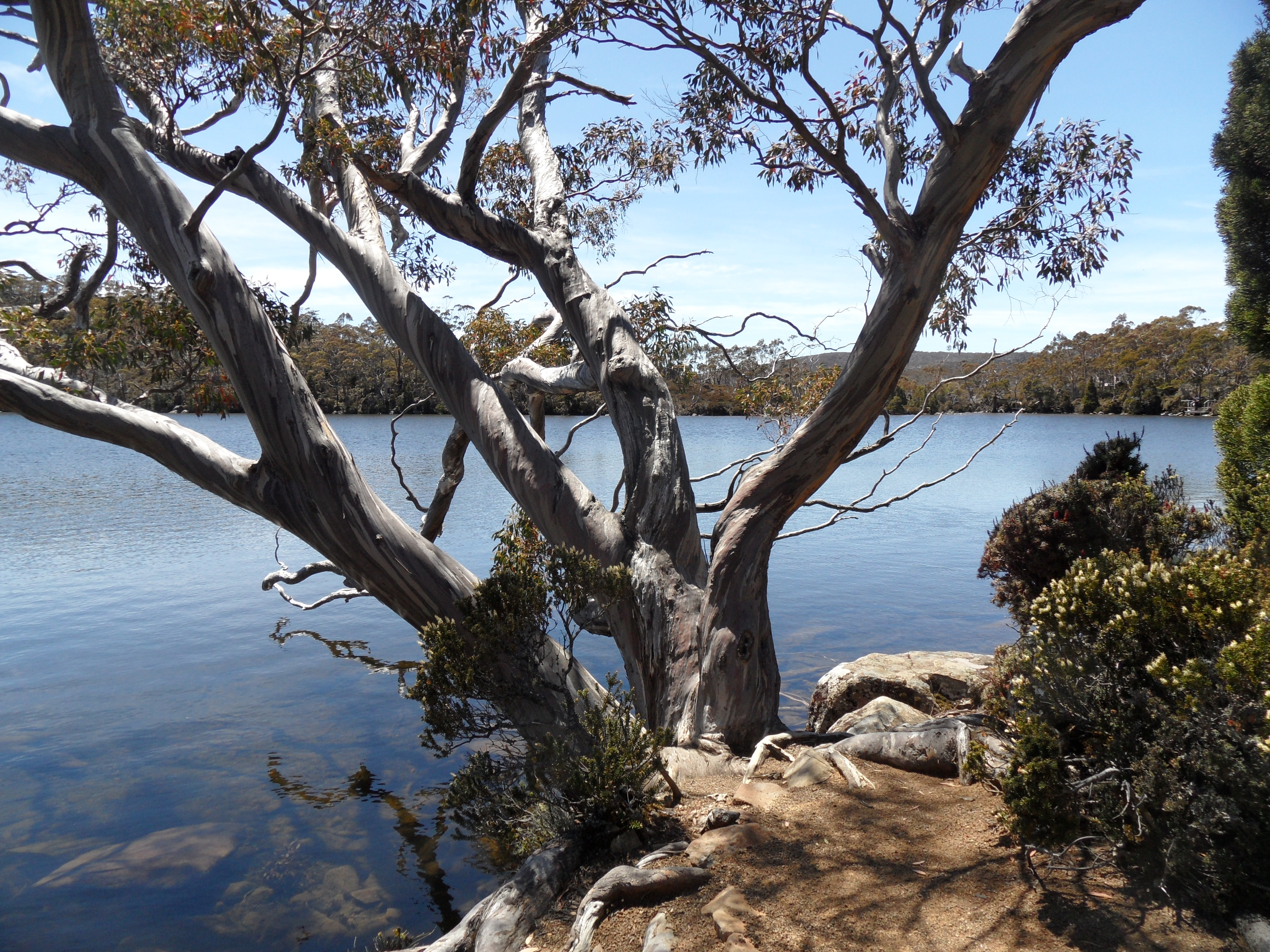
Lake Dobson, Mount Field National Park, Tasmania

The intention of the Victorian Field Naturalists to rename King Island's Big Lake to Lake Dobson in 1887 was never implemented.

However, in 1953 the Tasmanian Tramp reported that the name Lake Dobson had been officially assigned to a body of water in the Mount Field National Park on mainland Tasmania, as is shown in the Parks & Wildlife Service's Map of Mount Field National Park: . It is the namesake of Henry Dobson MHA (1841–1918), a prominent Tasmanian lawyer and politician, who founded the Tourist Association.

=== Lake Flannigan ===
Although the Lands Department had no formal responsibility for naming places in Tasmania prior to 1956, several of the staff were keenly interested in nomenclature. The surveyors' field books of period are catalogued in the archives, but are not available, and the correspondence of the department does not reveal who was responsible for naming Lake Flannigan, but it may have been any or all of the following of Flannigan's colleagues:

- Hall: In 2006 Smith wrote of Hall's interest in place names: “in 1885 Leventhorpe [Michael] Hall, Chief Draftsman of the Surveys Office, drew up a list of Aboriginal words to be applied to any new towns, parishes etc.". So, even in 1911, in retirement, he may have had a part in the naming of the lake after his late colleague.
- Harrisson: the obituary of the District Surveyor Kenneth Montague Harrisson records that, like MJ Flannigan, he worked on King Island and it tells of his enthusiasm for naming places as he surveyed them.
- Hurst: Harrisson's colleague William Nevin Tatlow Hurst spoke and wrote in detail about the naming of Tasmania's places, especially in 1911. Hurst was Acting Surveyor-General from May to September 1911, whilst Counsel was overseas on government business. He was not only a colleague of Flannigan's but also a personal friend. Flannigan witnessed Hurst's mother's will, in 1897 and he named Hurst as an executor on his own will in 1901, referring to him as “my friend”.

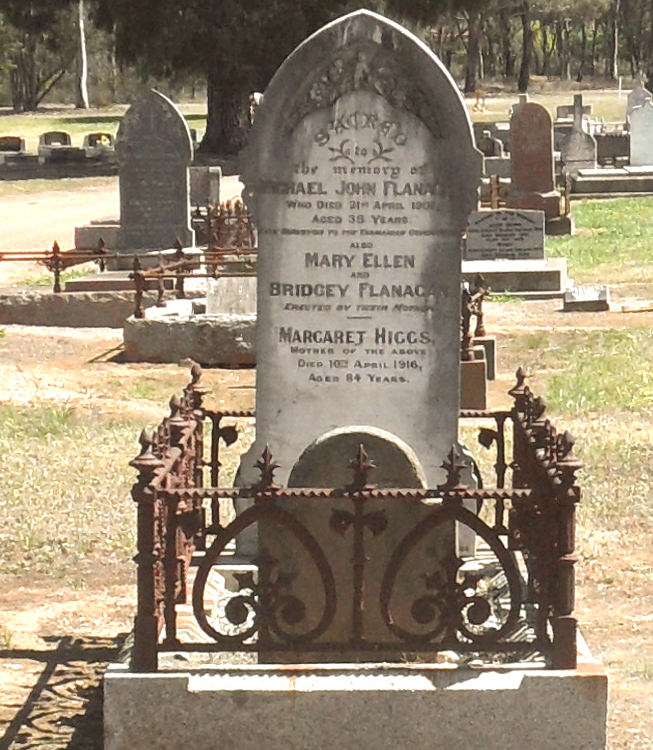
Flannigan's grave in White Hills cemetery, Bendigo, Victoria

Flannigan conducted surveys on King Island several times from 1895 onwards, and bought two parcels of land there, above the Ettrick River. He was appointed as permanent District Surveyor for the island in 1899. But severe ill-health forced him to leave the island in 1901. He returned to his family (his Irish mother, Margaret O'Halloran and her son from her second marriage, William Higgs) in Bendigo Victoria, and died there of tuberculosis in April 1901, aged 38.

By 1913, he had become permanently commemorated by the naming of Lake Flannigan in his honour.

The name Big Lake was transferred to a previously nameless lagoon on the edge of Colliers Swamp Conservation Area, in the southernmost locality of Surprise Bay, King Island.

== Climate ==
Lake Flannigan has an oceanic climate (Cfb) bordering on a warm Mediterranean climate (Csb).

Climate data for Lake Flannigan 1990–2022
Month	Jan	Feb	Mar	Apr	May	Jun	Jul	Aug	Sep	Oct	Nov	Dec	Year
Average rainfall mm (inches)	38.5 (1.52)	30.5 (1.20)	39.8 (1.57)	51.7 (2.04)	79.7 (3.14)	85.3 (3.36)	104.9 (4.13)	114.1 (4.49)	76.8 (3.02)	62.6 (2.46)	49.3 (1.94)	40.4 (1.59)	764.5 (30.10)
Source: Bureau of Meteorology (Climate Data Online)

== Water bodies on King Island ==
The island is very well-endowed with sources of fresh water, although some are ephemeral.

There are forty-five lakes and lagoons distributed across the island.

Lakes and Lagoons on King Island
A – E	G – Pi	Pj – Z
Attrills Lagoon	George Lagoon	Porky Lagoon
Bertie Lagoon	Granite Lagoon	Ridge Lagoon
Big Lake	Lake Flannigan	Sam Lagoon
Bob Lagoon (Game Reserve)	Lake Martha Lavinia	Seal Rocks Lagoon
Bungaree Lagoon (Conservation Area)	Lake Wickham	Shearing Shed Lagoons
Cask Lake	Lily Lagoon (Nature Reserve)	Snake Hole
Chain of Lagoons	Little Cask Lake	Stick Lagoon
Clevelands Lagoon	Long Lagoon	Sullivans Lagoon
Corduroy Lake	Manresa Lagoon	Swan Lagoon
Dead Sea	Meatsafe Lagoon	Tathams Lagoon (Conservation Area)
Deep Lagoons (Conservation Area)	Mimi Lagoon	Three Tree Lagoon
Denbys Lagoons	Muddy Lagoon (Nature Reserve)	Wallaby Lagoon
Dry Lagoon (Conservation Area)	Pearshape Lagoon	White Beach Lagoon
Duck Ponds	Pennys Lagoon	Woodland Lagoon
Egg Lagoon (drained)	Pioneer Lagoon	Yellow Rock Lagoon

== Historical photos from King Island ==
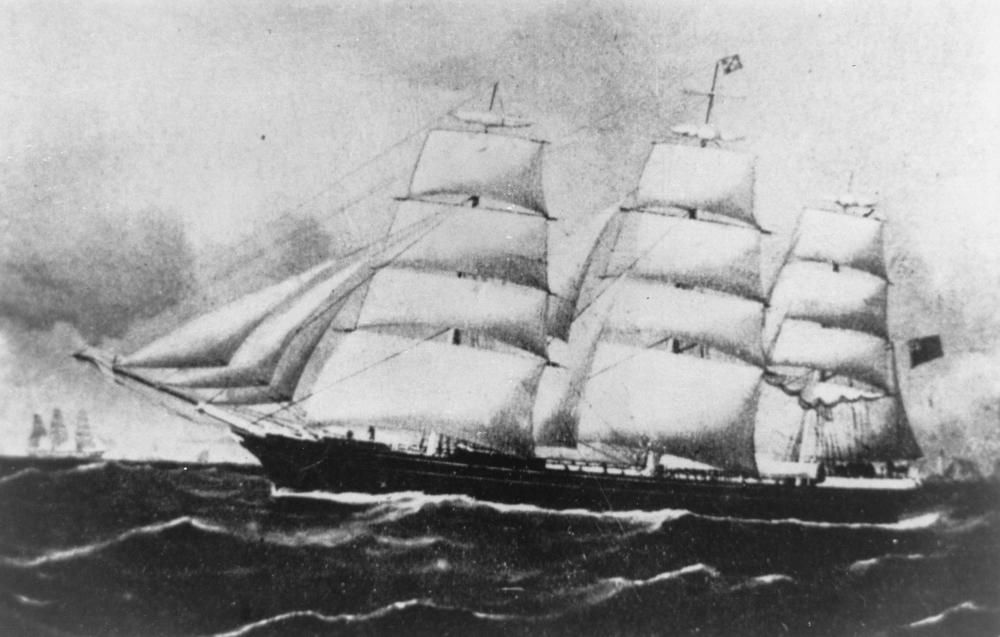
The Netherby was wrecked on King Island in July 1866, State Library Qld.

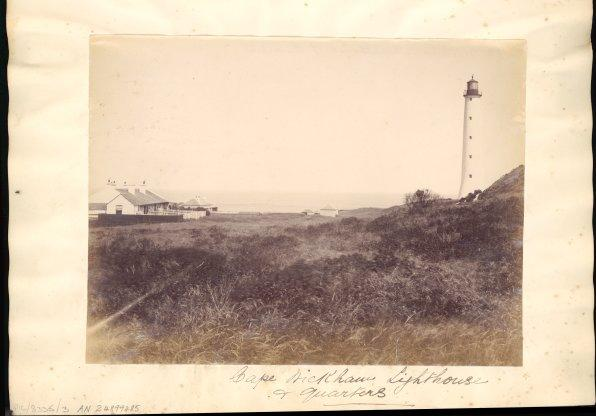
Wickham Lighthouse and quarters, King Island. Only the lighthouse remains.

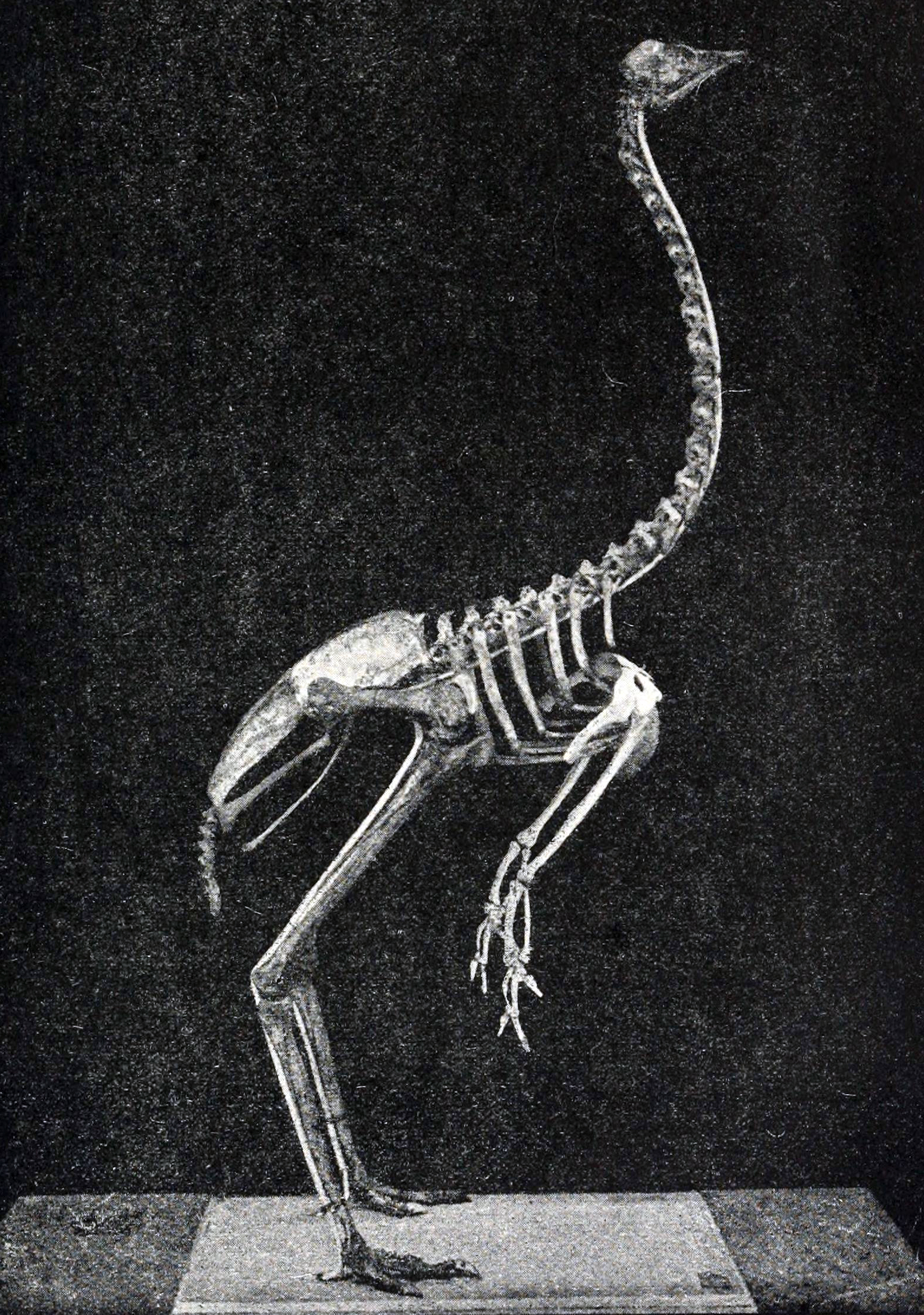
King Island Emu skeleton: Specimen of the extinct Dromaeus ater discovered in the Royal Zoological Museum, Florence. The Ibis, Quarterly Journal of Ornithology. Vol. I. Eighth Series 1901

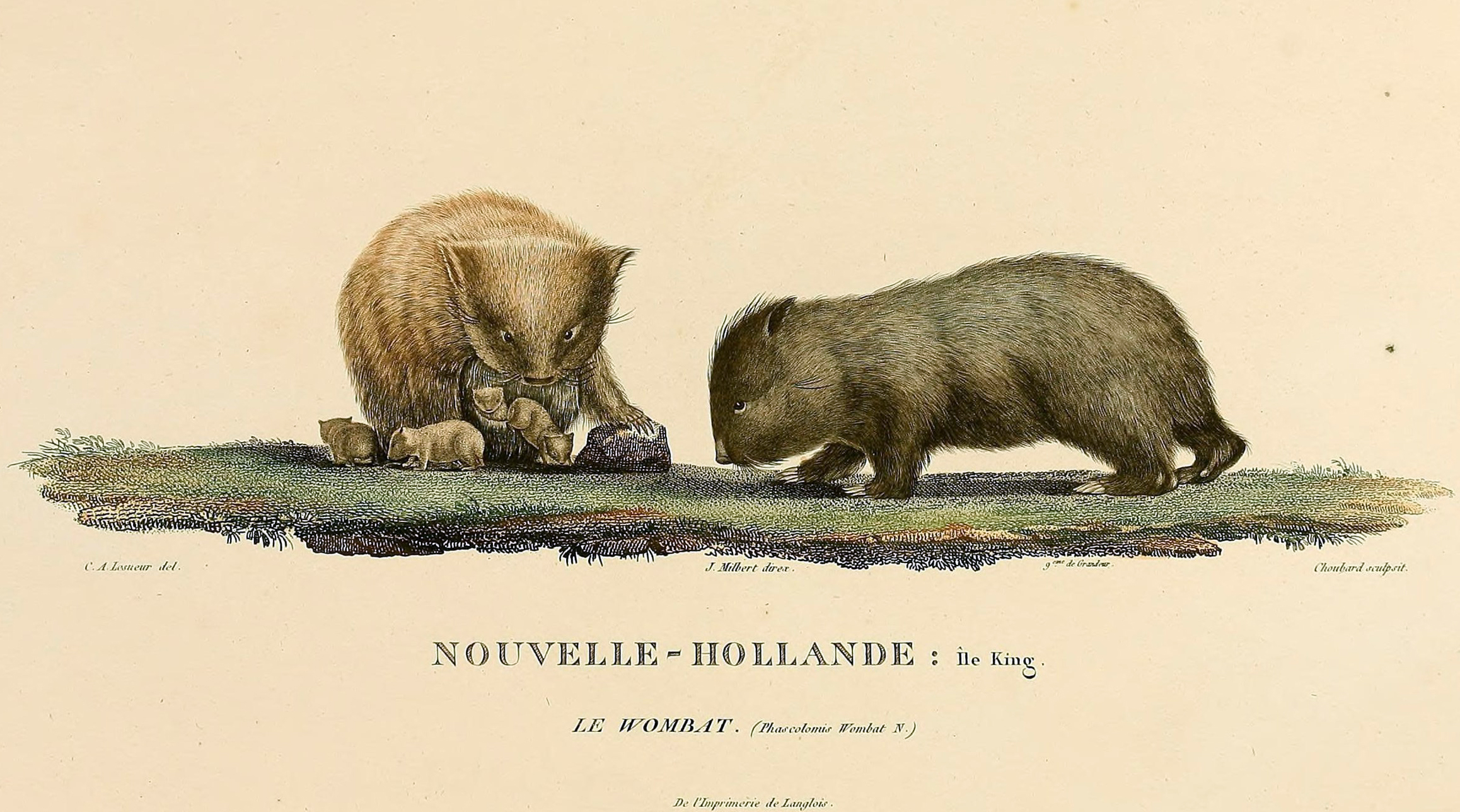
Illustration of the now extinct wombat of King Island, by Charles-Alexandre Lesueur

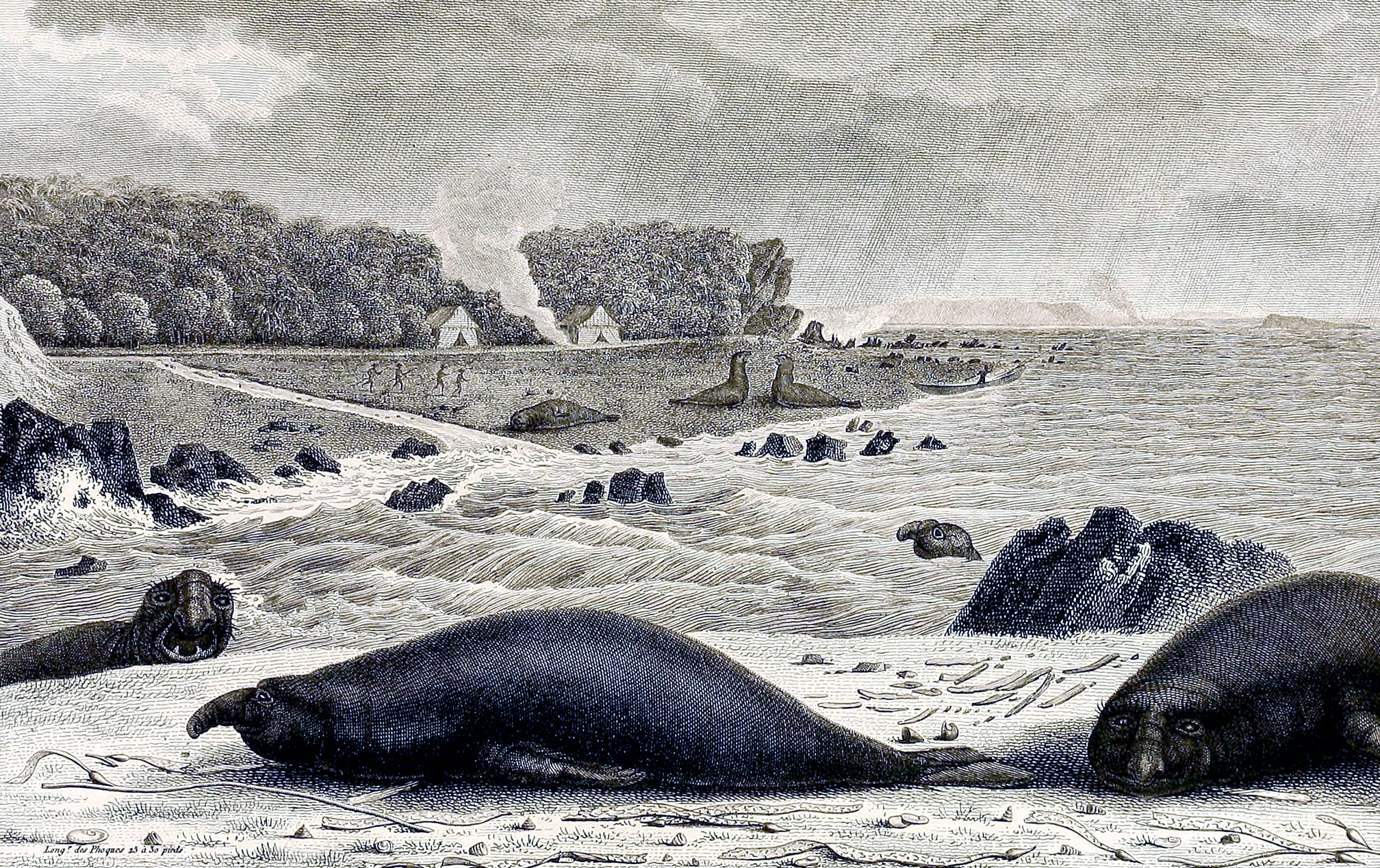
Elephant seals, ‘’Dromaius novaehollandiae minor’’, on King Island in former times

== See also ==
- List of reservoirs and dams in Australia § Tasmania
- List of lakes of Australia § Tasmania
