= Richard H. Tatlow III =

American civil engineer (1906–1993)

- Born: May 27, 1906; Denver, Colorado, U.S.
- Died: July 1, 1993 (aged 86); Scarsdale, New York, U.S.
- Burial place: Forest Hill Cemetery; Kansas City, Missouri, U.S.
- Education: University of Colorado (BS, CE)
- Spouse: Annette Victoria Hart (m. 1932)
- Engineering career
- Employers: Bureau of Public Roads (1927–1929), Harrington & Cortelyou (1929–1940), Abbott, Merkt & Co. (1946–1985)
- Military career
- Branch: United States Army
- Service years: 1940–1945
- Rank: Colonel
- Conflicts: World War II
- Awards: Legion of Merit

Richard H. Tatlow III (May 27, 1906 – July 1, 1993) was an American civil engineer that was associated with the architecture and engineering firm of Abbott, Merkt & Co. for nearly four decades, serving as the company's president for 28 years. During World War II, he was responsible for managing the industrial facilities program for the Army Service Forces. Tatlow served as president of the American Institute of Consulting Engineers and American Society of Civil Engineers in 1960 and 1968, respectively, and was elected as a member of the National Academy of Engineering in 1967.

== Early life and education ==
Richard Henry Tatlow III was born in Denver, Colorado on May 27, 1906 to Richard H. Tatlow Jr. and Viletta Tatlow (née Crow). His father was the inventor of the Tatlow motor for operating railway turntables, which was extensively used by several railroads. When Richard III was 11 years old, his father died in an automobile accident while traveling to visit his parents and sisters in Holden, Missouri, where Richard H. Tatlow was the publisher of The Holden Enterprise. His mother was seriously injured in the accident when their car skidded and overturned, but Richard III and his sister Laurene had been left at home to attend school. (Note: Richard H. Tatlow Jr. was the grandson of former Missouri Congressman Thomas L. Anderson.)

Tatlow graduated from North High School in Denver and attended the University of Colorado, where he received a bachelor's of science in civil engineering in 1927. He subsequently earned a civil engineering degree from his alma mater in 1933 and wrote his thesis on the subject of "Calculations of Stresses in Bascule Pony Trusses".

== Career ==
After he received his undergraduate degree, Tatlow spent two years as a junior engineer with the Bureau of Public Roads and assisted with the design of bridges and roads throughout the United States. He began working at the engineering firm of Harrington & Cortelyou in Kansas City, Missouri in 1929.

Tatlow was commissioned as a lieutenant colonel in the Army Quartermaster Corps in July 1940 and he began serving on the Construction Advisory Committee the following year. He was promoted to a colonel in the Army Corps of Engineers and was made responsible for managing the industrial facilities program for the Army Service Forces from 1942 to 1945, for which he was recognized with the Legion of Merit.

In 1946, Tatlow became the president of the firm of Abbott, Merkt & Co. The New York City-based architecture and engineering firm specialized in the design of commercial and industrial buildings, including shopping centers, department stores, warehouses, and industrial plants for clients such as American Airlines, J. C. Penney, Macy's, Pan American World Airways, Saks & Co., UPS, and the United States Postal Service. Tatlow authored numerous articles on topics such as shopping center design, materials storage and merchandise distribution. He became chairman of the board in 1974 when he was succeeded as president of Abbott, Merkt & Co. by his son, Richard H. Tatlow IV. (Note: Richard H. Tatlow IV received a civil engineering degree from Cornell University in 1961 and joined his father's firm of Abbott, Merkt & Co. after serving with the Army Corps of Engineers in Vietnam from 1965 to 1966.) He retired from the firm in 1985.

Tatlow helped in founding the NUS (Nuclear Utility Services) Corporation in 1960, which provided consulting and engineering services for the nuclear power industry. In 1964, he was appointed by the National Academy of Sciences to serve on a committee that studied the effects of the sonic boom from supersonic transport (SST). He was also appointed by Mayor John Lindsay to serve on the New York City Science and Technology Advisory Council.

== Professional societies and awards ==
Tatlow became involved with the American Society of Civil Engineers (ASCE) while he was a student, serving as the president of the ASCE chapter at the University of Colorado. He was elected as president of the ASCE Metropolitan Section in 1958 and received the section's Civil Engineer of the Year Award in 1968. Tatlow subsequently led the national society, serving as the president of ASCE in 1968.

In 1960, he was elected as president of the American Institute of Consulting Engineers. Tatlow was a chairman of the Building Research Advisory Board, a fellow of the American Society of Mechanical Engineers, and a member of the Newcomen Society of North America.

Tatlow was elected as a member of the National Academy of Engineering in 1967. He was a recipient of the University of Colorado's Distinguished Engineering Alumnus Award and the George Norlin Award in 1968 and 1970, respectively. In 1969, he was the second recipient of the Professional Engineers in Private Practice (PEPP) award for outstanding service to the private practice sector presented by the PEPP section of the National Society of Professional Engineers.

== Personal life and death ==
He married Annette Victoria Hart in Kansas City on June 18, 1932. They subsequently resided near Washington, D.C. prior to moving to Scarsdale, New York in 1946. Tatlow was a member of the Chevy Chase Club in Chevy Chase, Maryland, the Cosmos Club in Washington, D.C., the Fox Meadow Tennis Club in Scarsdale, the Shenorock Shore Club in Rye, New York, and the Union League Club in New York City. (Note: Platform tennis originated in Scarsdale, New York and the sport's first national championship was held at Scarsdale's Fox Meadow Tennis Club in 1935. Tatlow served as an advisor for the American Platform Tennis Association (APTA) and volunteered his services and those of his firm in making revisions to the set of plans, specifications, a bill of materials, and photographs of construction that were sent out by the APTA to those interested in building their own platform tennis courts.) He was a director of the Animal Medical Center of New York and a member of the Bronxville Planning Commission and the Architectural League of New York.

Tatlow died of pneumonia at his home in Scarsdale on July 1, 1993. He was buried at Forest Hill Cemetery in Kansas City. In 1999, Richard H. Tatlow IV donated his father's collection of papers and records from Abbott, Merkt & Co. as a gift to Columbia University.
