= William Nevin Tatlow Hurst =

Tasmanian civil servant (1868–1946)

- Born: 11 April 1868; Hobart, Tasmania, Australia
- Died: 24 December 1946 (aged 78 years); Hobart, Tasmania, Australia
- Occupations: Secretary for Lands, Tasmania, Australia

William Nevin Tatlow Hurst, ISO (11 April 1868 – 24 December 1946) was a senior Tasmanian civil servant. In 1925 he succeeded the Tasmanian Surveyor-General, E A Counsel, as the head of the Tasmanian Department of Lands and Surveys, although with the title of Secretary for Lands.

The Companionship of the Imperial Service Order (ISO) was bestowed upon him in June 1932.

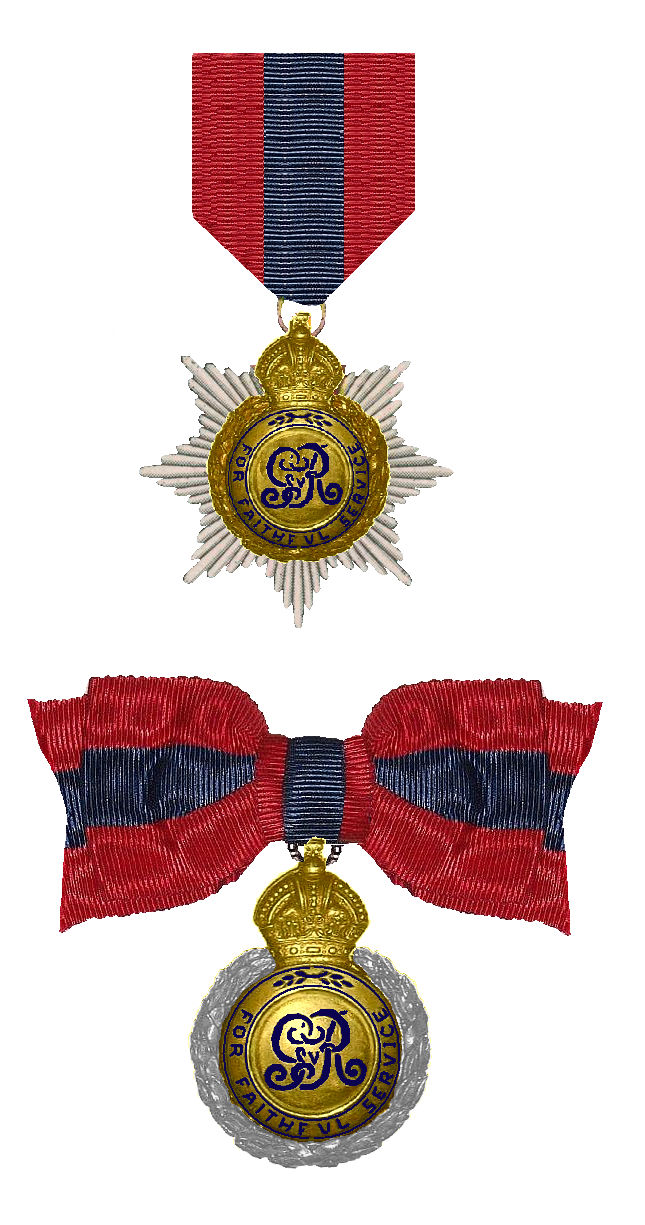
ISO medal after 1912, as worn by men (above) and women (below)

At his retirement in 1938 he had been continuously employed in the department for fifty three years, having joined as a trainee draftsman on 1 July 1885.

Tasmania's capital city, Hobart, was where he spent his life, with the suburb of New Town being his home at his birth in 1868, his marriage in 1899 and at his death in 1946.

== Family background ==
As his full name suggests, Hurst's ancestors were from the families of the Tatlows, the Nevins and the Hursts.

=== Maternal ancestors – Tatlow and Moore ===
Hurst's grandparents, Anthony Tatlow (1791–1861) and Mary Moore (1812–1865) migrated from County Cavan, Ireland, arriving at the Tasmanian port of Hobart Town on 26 June 1833.

Their first child, Anthony Tatlow (junior) (1832-1885), made his mark in Stanley, Tasmania. Since 1982 (150 years after his baptism in the Church of Ireland Parish Church in Drung, County Cavan, Ireland) he has been commemorated by a nature reserve in Stanley, known as the Tatlow's Beach Conservation Area.

Their fourth and youngest child was Louisa Maria Tatlow, born on 27 May 1841 in Launceston. She married John Hurst on 27 November 1862, in the River Forth district (77 kilometres west of Launceston). John Hurst was recorded on their marriage certificate as a surveyor, although Walch's Tasmanian Almanac has no official record of his being qualified or registered as a licensed surveyor, so he would have been employed as a temporary contractor. John Hurst is sometimes mistaken for John Robert Hurst who was officially recorded as a District Surveyor working in and around Launceston, from 1863 to 1884.

Louisa and John Hurst's first child was a son, William Nevin Tatlow Hurst, who was born in Hobart, 11 April 1868.

Their second and last child was a daughter, Edith Rhoda Hurst who was born in Whanganui, New Zealand, 24 October 1871.

=== Paternal ancestors ===
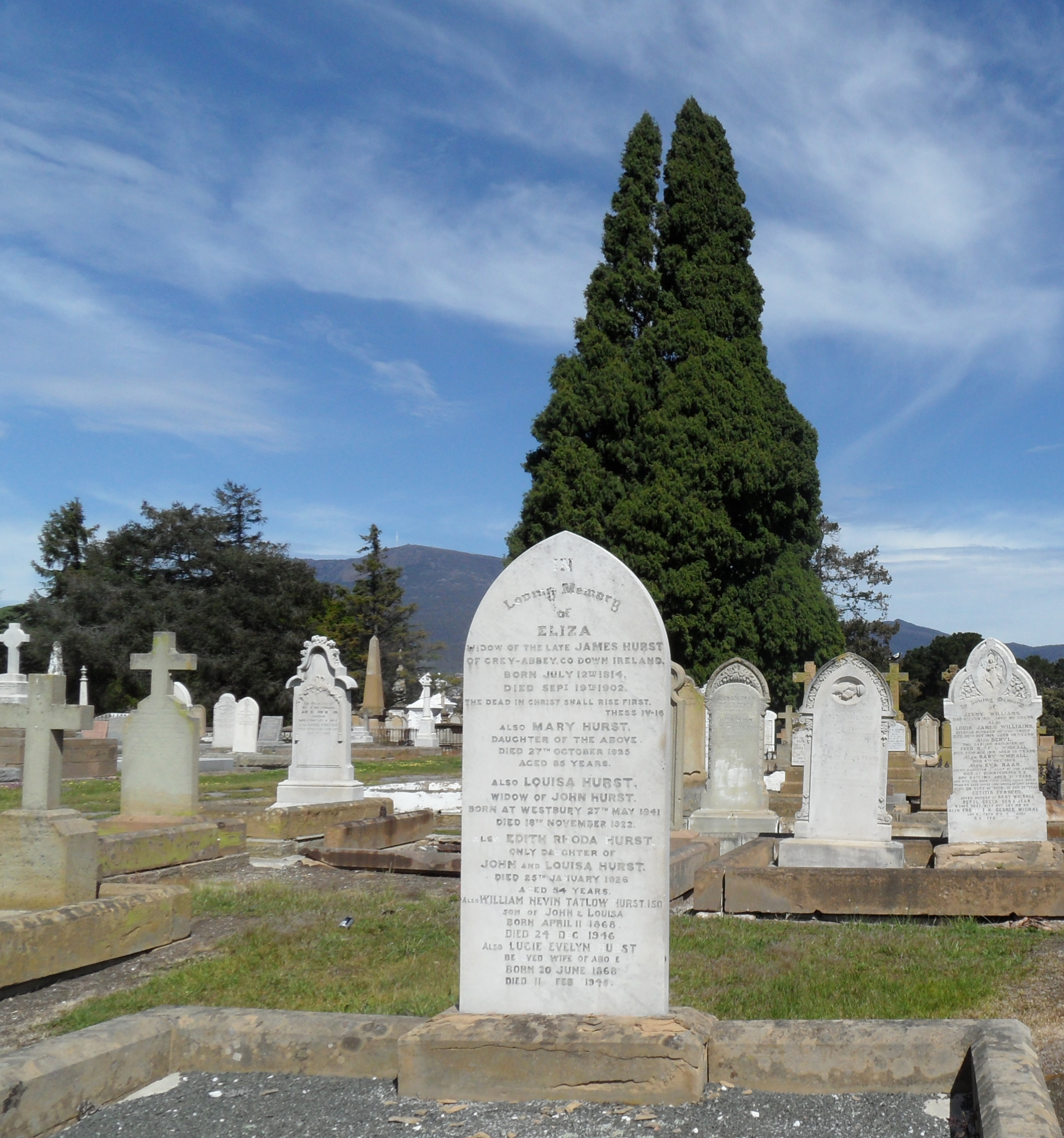
Hurst Family Grave in Cornelian Bay Cemetery, Section W, grave 224

WNT Hurst's grandmother, Eliza Nevin (1814–1902), was confirmed in St Saviour's Church of Ireland parish church in the small village of Greyabbey, County Down, Northern Ireland.

Although previously a member of the Church of Ireland, Eliza was married to a Presbyterian man, James Hurst (d. 1850), so the marriage was conducted 17 July 1837 by the local Presbyterian Minister David Jeffrey. William Nevin Tatlow Hurst's father, John Hurst, arrived from Northern Ireland at the age of sixteen, with his sister, Mary Jane Hurst, and his mother, Eliza Hurst (nee Nevin).

== Education ==
William Nevin Tatlow Hurst attended the Hobart Town High School and Christ's College Hobart (before it became a university college).

His sister Edith would go on to gain three university degrees, but Hurst did not pursue a university education. As a school-leaver aged 17, he chose to start work in the government Department of Lands and Surveys, as a junior draftsman. His qualifications did not include the certification needed to become a licensed surveyor and he was never registered as such. Instead, his career advanced via senior technical and clerical roles and then management roles within the department.

== Community ==
An obituary for Hurst in a local newspaper recalls his keen interest in playing sport and helping to develop and manage various sporting clubs in Hobart, as well as his close involvement with his local church:

He formerly was a keen cricketer and played with New Town until district cricket was abandoned during the First World War. He was a foundation member of the Buckingham Rowing Club and supported rowing activities always. He became a member of the Hobart Regatta Committee in 1923, and was made a life member in 1943. ... He was a life-long member of St John's Anglican Church, New Town, and for many years was churchwarden and Synod representative. (Mercury, 26 December 1946).

== Employment ==
=== Roles ===
The Department of Lands and Surveys employed professional surveyors on a permanent basis. In busy times it hired unlicensed contract surveyors to support the professionals. The surveyor's role is described by Fryer:

Surveyors of the later 19th century period were concerned mainly with the fair distribution of land. Their main work was in the marking and recording of details of the country being developed. In performing this task, the positions of all creek and river systems, vegetation types, soil types, geological features, the potential of the land for agriculture, etc., were faithfully recorded and the land was evaluated prior to distribution. (Fryer, p.72).

An example of a professional surveyor praised by the Surveyor-General was Hurst's colleague Michael John Flannigan.

The Department of Lands and Surveys also employed highly skilled technical draftsmen. They prepared official government cadastral maps representing the physical features of the territory and showing the boundaries and ownership of parcels of land, as these details were brought back from field trips by the surveyors.

Hurst spent the first 22 years of his career occupied as a draftsman. His long career progressed as follows:

1. 1885–1887: Junior Draftsman
2. 1887–1901: Draftsman
3. 1901–1907: Draftsman-in-Charge
4. 1907–1911: Chief Clerk
5. 1911 (for 5 months, May to September): Acting Surveyor-General
6. 1912–1925: Assistant Secretary for Lands
7. 1925–1938: Secretary for Lands

=== Job title ===
E A Counsel was Surveyor-General from 1894 to 1924. The holder of that title traditionally also held responsibility as the Secretary for Lands, reporting to the Minister for Lands and Works. At the time of Counsel's retirement many Tasmanian departments were being re-organized, to reduce costs. The position of Surveyor-General was abolished (not for the first time). and not restored until 1943.

Thus Hurst inherited only the title of Secretary for Lands, but held full responsibility for the department which became known as the Department of Lands and Surveys and Closer Settlement. The Scenery Preservation Office also came under his management.

An official photograph of the members of the Lyons Tasmanian state government in 1926, entitled "Labor members of Parliament – M O'Keefe, J Cleary, P Kelly, A Lawson, C Culley, W Shoobridge, JA Guy, J Belton, JA Lyons, AG Ogilvie, J Hurst and G Becker" has been mistakenly thought (anecdotally) to depict William Nevin Tatlow Hurst. However, as the photograph title indicates, it is James Abraham Hurst (1880–1964) who appears in this photograph of ministers of the Lyons government, because at the time he was the Labor member for Darwin, Tasmania. There are similarities between the J. Hurst depicted with Lyons and the younger WNT Hurst who is shown in his grandson's autobiography; but WNT Hurst was nearing sixty years of age and had lost his hair by the time of the 1926 photograph.

== Legacy ==
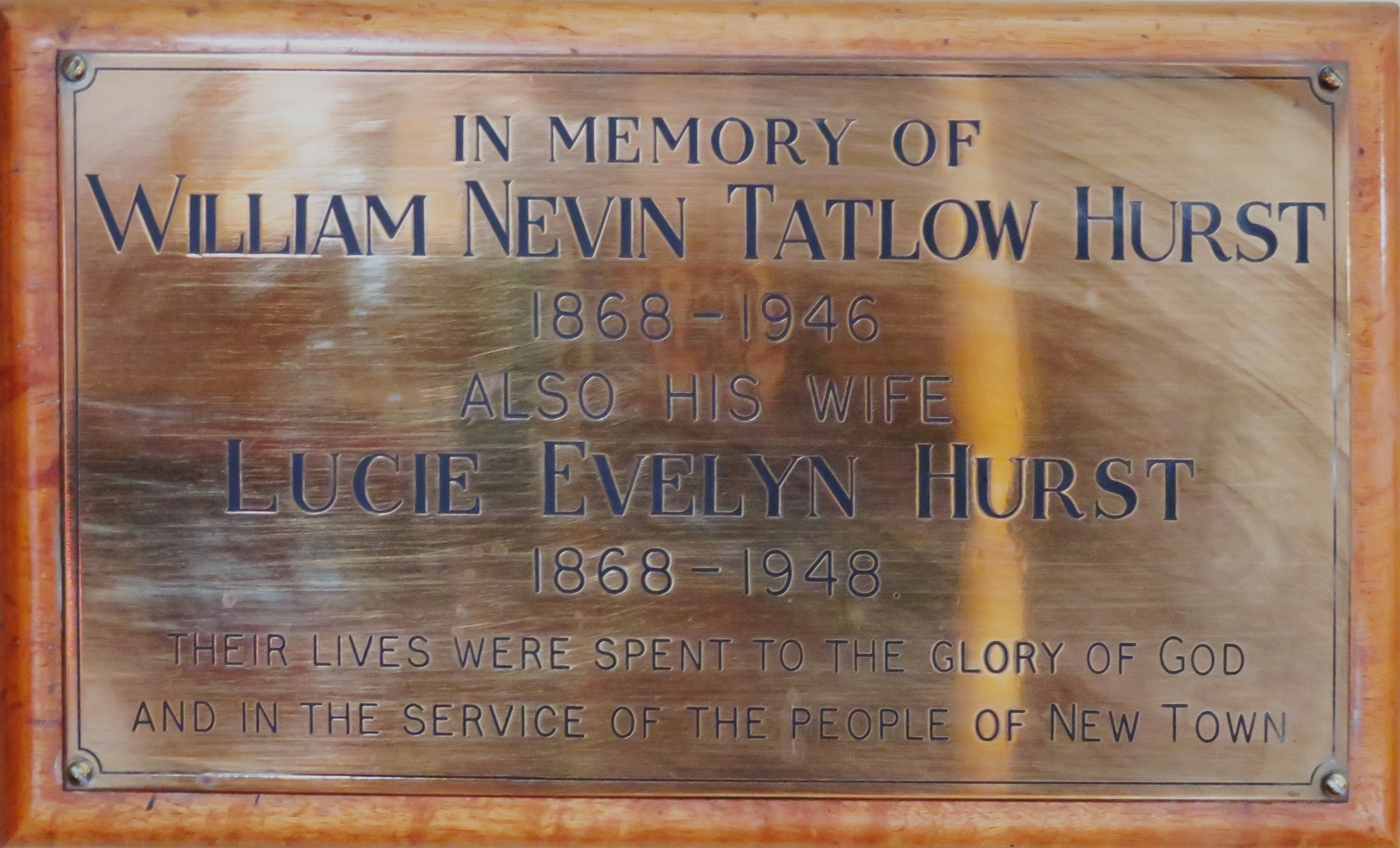
Memorial to Nevin and Lucie Hurst in St John's Anglican Church, New Town

Hurst was appreciated in many walks of life: his profession, his sports clubs, and his church and charitable works. One of his obituaries attests to his being well-loved:

An exceptionally large number of people attended the funeral of Mr. William Nevin Tatlow Hurst, former Tasmanian Secretary of Lands, at Cornelian Bay today. Services at the home and at St. John's Church, New Town, and at the graveside were conducted by the Rector of St. John's, (Rev. C. Cuthbertson) and the former Rector (Canon C.H. Corvan). (The Advocate, December 1946).

Hurst attracted this high level of popularity from early in his career. The Surveyor recorded that his colleagues presented him with good wishes and a gold watch on the eve of his marriage in April 1899:

A very pleasing ceremony took place on the afternoon of the 10th instant in the Department of Lands and Surveys, when Mr. W. N. T. Hurst, a prominent officer of that Department, and one of the Auditors of our Institution, was, on the eve of his marriage, presented with an illuminated address and a very handsome gold watch from the officers and surveyors employed by the Department. The Surveyor-General (Mr. E. A. Counsel) made the presentation, and in doing so referred, in eulogistic terms, to Mr. Hurst’s career, which commenced when he entered the office as a boy in 1885. Since that time, the Surveyor-General said, Mr. Hurst had, by consistent industry and attention to duty, worked himself from the bottom of the ladder, into his present honourable position, and not only attained that position, but with it the goodwill and respect of everybody with whom he had been brought in contact. (The Surveyor, p. 274)

=== Tasmanian place names ===
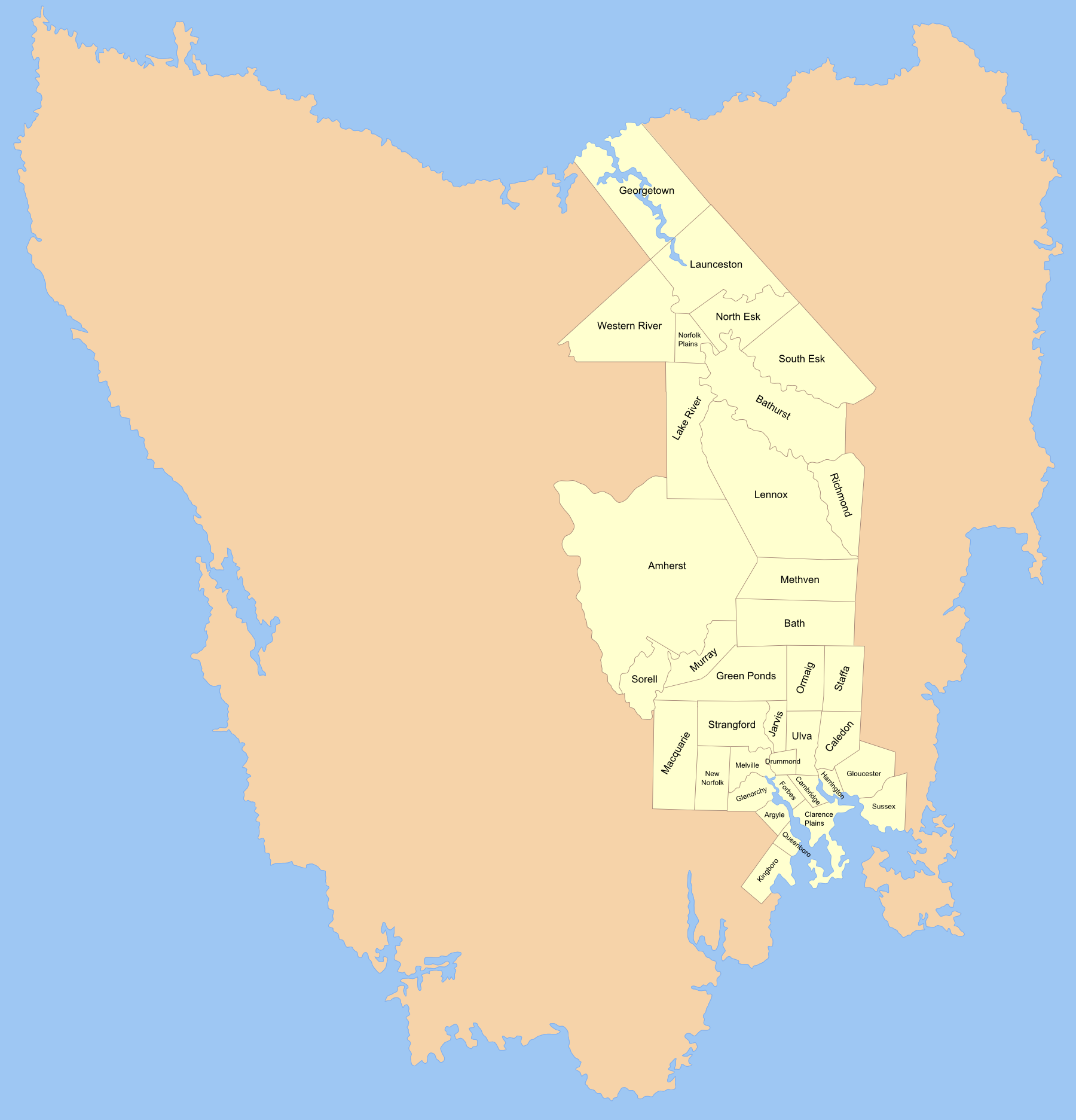
Map showing the names of 36 districts as used in 1855

One of Hurst's intellectual passions was nomenclature, the naming of Tasmania's places (towns, streets etc.) and physical features (lakes, mountains, rivers etc.). The Tasmanian Nomenclature Board was not established until 1953; before that there were no procedures, and no official collection of records.

He presented a scholarly paper on the subject in 1898, to a meeting of the Institute of Surveyors, Tasmania.

In 1911, he returned to the topic, endeavouring to tap into the knowledge of the general population. Each Saturday from 15 July to 30 September, using the pseudonym "Nomen", he published an article in the pages of the Mercury newspaper. In each article he set out what was currently known about the origins of Tasmania's place names and he asked the public to send any new information to the Mercury. In consecutive articles he published the updated information and asked for further input. In article 12 a consolidated list of all names was promised, but no trace of it has come to light so far.

The articles can be accessed online as follows:

Article 1; Article 2; Article 3; Article 4; Article 5; Article 6;
Article 7; Article 8; Article 9; Article 10; Article 11; Article 12

=== The Hurst Papers ===
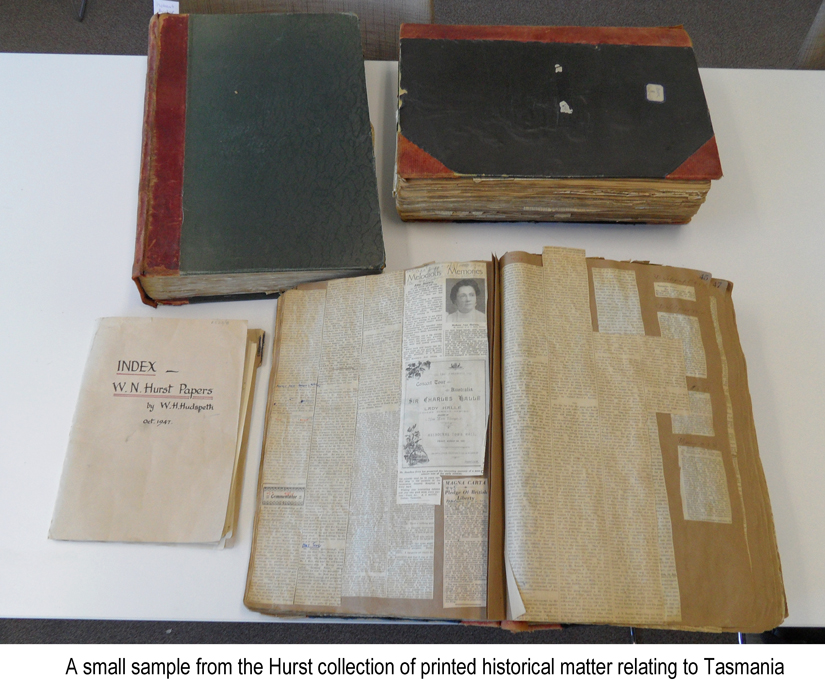

After his death Hurst's wife, Lucie Evelyn Elizabeth, née Foster, (1868–1948), presented the Royal Society of Tasmania with his collection of documents and ephemera about the history of Tasmania.

These are not personal papers but maps, pamphlets, and scrapbooks of newspaper clippings and other items of historical interest about life and government at that time. They are collectively known as The Hurst Papers, and are available in the Morris Miller Library of the University of Tasmania.

=== A Short History of the Settlement of Tasmania ===
In retirement Hurst published a twenty-eight page booklet: A Short History of the Settlement of Tasmania.

== Appendix A ==
=== Verifiable source documents in the Tasmanian Archives in Hobart ===
TAHO (c) Alphabetical descriptive list of immigrants arriving under the indenture system – details of name, ship, marital state, age, religion, native place, trade & bounty paid, January 1854 to December 1856.

- Column 1, No. of Book: 9
- Columns 2 to 8 are the same as TAHO (b)
- Column 9, Ship and Date of Arrival: Flora McDonald, Launceston, February 3, 1855

=== Verifiable source documents in the Public Records Office of Northern Ireland (PRONI) in Belfast ===
PRONI holds copies of some of the original baptism, confirmation and burial records for the Hurst family in Greyabbey in the 1800s. The records were transcribed in 2002 from the Registers of the Church of Ireland (i.e. Protestant) Parish church in Greyabbey, County Down, by members of the North of Ireland Family History Society, which hold indexes for the records and they will readily share them if requested.

The PRONI records are on microfilm. Researchers are not permitted to reproduce the records apart from printing a copy of individual microfilm records.

As at October 2017, the following records for William Nevin Tatlow Hurst's ancestors have been identified at PRONI

BURIALS: Hurst, James, aged 80- ? [should be c. 40]; Hurst, Eliza, aged 4; Hurst, David, aged 16 months; Hurst, William, aged 4

The above –mentioned records are to be found on PRONI's microfilm reel MIC 1/48/1.

PRONI's reel MIC 1/300/2 also holds records from the Church of Ireland – for the Parish of Drung, County Cavan. The Register of Baptisms for the year 1832 has a record for Anthony Tatlow (Junior), who was the brother of WNT Hurst's mother, Louisa Maria Tatlow, both being the children of Anthony Tatlow and Mary Moore of Drung.

== See also ==
- Nevin-Hurst family tree in Ancestry.com (membership required)
