= Board on Infrastructure and Constructed Environment =

The Board on Infrastructure and Constructed Environment (BICE) is a part of the Engineering and Physical Sciences division in the National Research Council (NRC).

== History ==
The Board was first organized in 1946 as the Building Research Advisory Board. BICE and its predecessor organizations have been the principal units of the NRC concerned with the built environment.

== Programs ==
Although most of the BICE activities are advisory services, a number of specific programs have been created and maintained over the years, one of which was the Federal Construction Council and its successor, the Federal Facilities Council.

== Federal Construction Council (FCC) ==
The Federal Construction Council was founded in 1953 at the request of the National Bureau of Standards as part of the NRC's division of Engineering and Industrial Research and its subdivision, the Building Research Advisory Board (BARB, later the BICE). It operated through the late 1990s, often supported by arrangements with the National Bureau of Standards, or the Department of Commerce. Its main purpose was to encourage continuing cooperation among those agencies with a direct or indirect interest in federal construction to advance the practice of design, construction, and operation of government facilities. It sought to minimize duplication of effort on technical studies as well as disseminate what are now termed best practices. It also sought to resolve technical problems of particular concern to the federal construction agencies.

Its membership comprised 19 members appointed by the BRAB chairman, with the approval of the Chairmen of the National Research Council; ten of its members were from the BARB and nine from nominations made by the Federal agencies providing financial support.

=== Early work ===
==== Practice surveys ====
In both 1954 and 1958, the FCC surveyed engineering practices in Building Technology by the thirty-six Federal agencies that had a direct or indirect interest in building or heavy construction, consisting of over 300 projects. The FCC would continue this survey practice to the late 1960s, producing updates in 1961 (SP3), 1963 (SP5), 1965 (SP6), 1968 (SP8).

==== Underground heat-distribution systems ====
An example of the work performed by this committee is its study of underground piping systems which at that time (1957-1964) was a ..."major and continuing concern to the Federal Construction Council." As result of its efforts, technical reports were published and sound design criteria were developed.

=== 1970-1980 ===
The Federal Construction Council's technical program for the 1970s included three broad categories of activities: continuing programs, ad hoc studies, and other activities. The council carried on 8 continuing programs: the Federal Construction Guide Specifications program (ended 1978), the Cost Engineering proqram, the Computer Technology proqram, the Design Criteria proqram, the Information Exchange program, the Fire Technology program, the Facilities Safety program, and the Procurement policy program.

The FCC conducted many "ad hoc" studies over the years to address "...specific problems or issues of mutual concern to federal construction agencies ... [dealing with] ... with both technical and administrative problems.

== Federal Facilities Council (FFC) ==
The Federal Facilities Council is a successor to the Federal Construction Council. It is a cooperative association of 20 federal agencies with interests and responsibilities related to all aspects of facility design, acquisition, management, maintenance, and evaluation.

== Project management at the Department of Energy (DOE) ==
The 105th Congressional Committee of Conference on Energy and Water Development in its appropriation conference report directed the U.S. Department of Energy (DOE) to undertake an independent review and assessment of its project management structure and processes for identifying, managing, designing and constructing facilities. The concern was the quality of the technical scopes, cost estimates, schedules, and supporting data regarding these construction projects as well as the validity of the proposed costs, scopes, and schedules. The study was to also include a review of large operating projects such as environmental projects which may or may not involve much construction, but should clearly be managed with the same principles and guidelines. The overall objective was achieve departmental processes that controlled the projects' cost and schedule as well as reduce cost growth and schedule slippages.

While the original congressional direction was for the US Army Corps of Engineers to perform the review, the final version allowed the DOE to ask the National Research Council (NRC) to conduct such a study. In 1998, prior to delivering the later general study in 1999, NRC completed a short time frame study using a generic approach to assess DOE's FY98 budget request, which did not attempt to address the broader issues of systems acquisition and project delivery within DOE raised by the conference report.

In its 2003 assessment report, NRC recommended that DOE ..."develop detailed procedures and guidance for identifying risks, planning strategies to address risks, and managing risks throughout the life cycle of projects, and should require their implementation for all projects." The DOE Office of Engineering and Construction Management (OECM) requested the committee to provide assistance for following this recommendation by summarizing practices the committee believes constitute excellence in risk management. Over the next seven years, NRC delivered four more reports on its assessments of DOE project management.

== See also ==
- Official website for the NRC's Board on Infrastructure and Constructed Environment (BICE)
- List of all BICE reports from 1985
- Official website for BICE's Federal Facilities Council (FFC)
- Rexmond C. Cochrane (1978). The National Academy of Sciences: The First Hundred Years, 1863-1963. National Academies. ISBN 9780309025188. NAP:11988. ISBN 0-309-02518-4
