= Quarry Hill, Victoria =

Quarry Hill
- Suburb
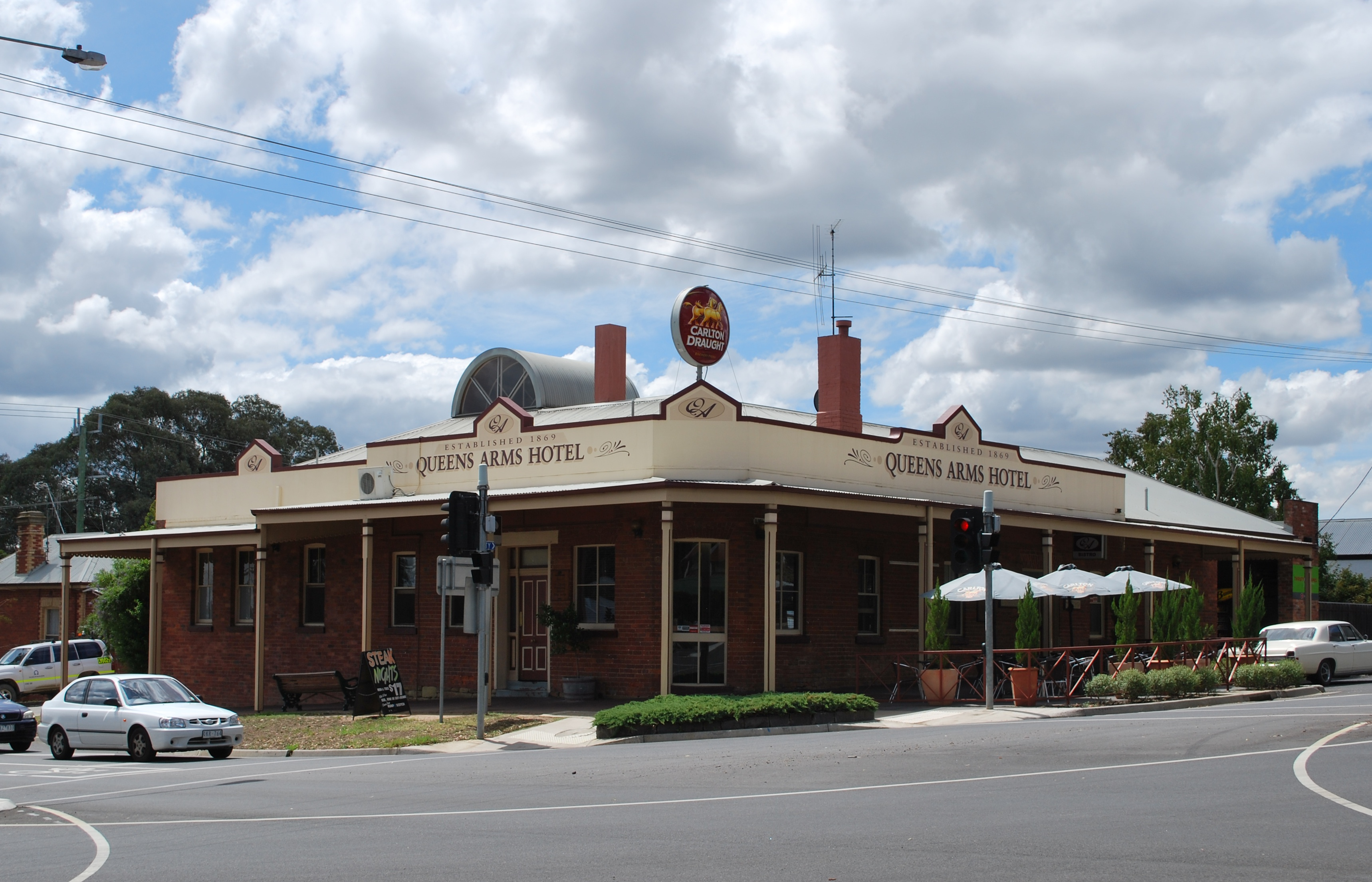
- Queens Arms Hotel

- Interactive map of Quarry Hill
- Coordinates: 36°46′S 144°17′E
- Country: Australia
- State: Victoria
- City: Bendigo
- LGA: City of Greater Bendigo
- Location: 3 km (1.9 mi) S of Bendigo

Government
  - State electorate: Bendigo East
  - Federal division: Bendigo

Population
  - Total: 2,365 (2021 census)
- Postcode: 3550

Quarry Hill is a suburb of Bendigo, Victoria, Australia, 3 kilometres (1.9 mi) south of the Bendigo city centre. At the 2021 census, Quarry Hill had a population of 2,365.

== History ==
Originally known as Charcoal Gully, the area saw the establishment of an Anglican school in 1857. This was replaced in 1873 by a state school named Sandhurst East, which was renamed Quarry Hill in 1908.

The locality is characterized by hilly terrain with limited evidence of mining or quarrying activity. Notable places listed on the Victorian Heritage Register include The Eyrie (1874) at 18 Reginald Street and the Bendigo Cemetery, established in 1858, including its chapel and funerary oven.

Another significant property is Edelweiss on Hamlet Street, built in 1890 for Sir John Quick, a constitutional lawyer and Bendigo parliamentarian. Quick later contributed to local institutions such as the Bendigo Art Gallery and Mechanics' Institute and played a role in founding the Quarry Hill Golf Club.

== Facilities ==
Hamlet Street contains both Quarry Hill Community Hall and Quarry Hill Recreation Reserve.

St. Joseph's Catholic Primary School, Gladstone Street, is located in the parish of St. Joseph. Archbishop Carr laid the school's foundation stone on 29 August 1906. The school opened for classes on 30 April 1907. Children attend from the suburbs of Quarry Hill and Spring Gully, as well as outer suburbs such as White Hills and Epsom.

Quarry Hill Primary School, Peel Street, opened in 1911.

Quarry Hill Golf Club is at 47–85 Houston St.

== Gallery ==
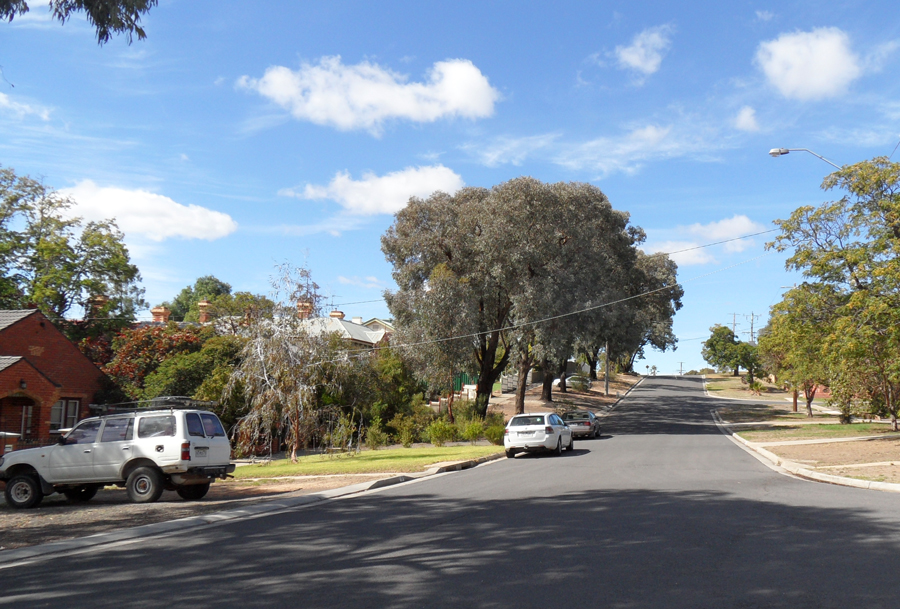
Howard Street

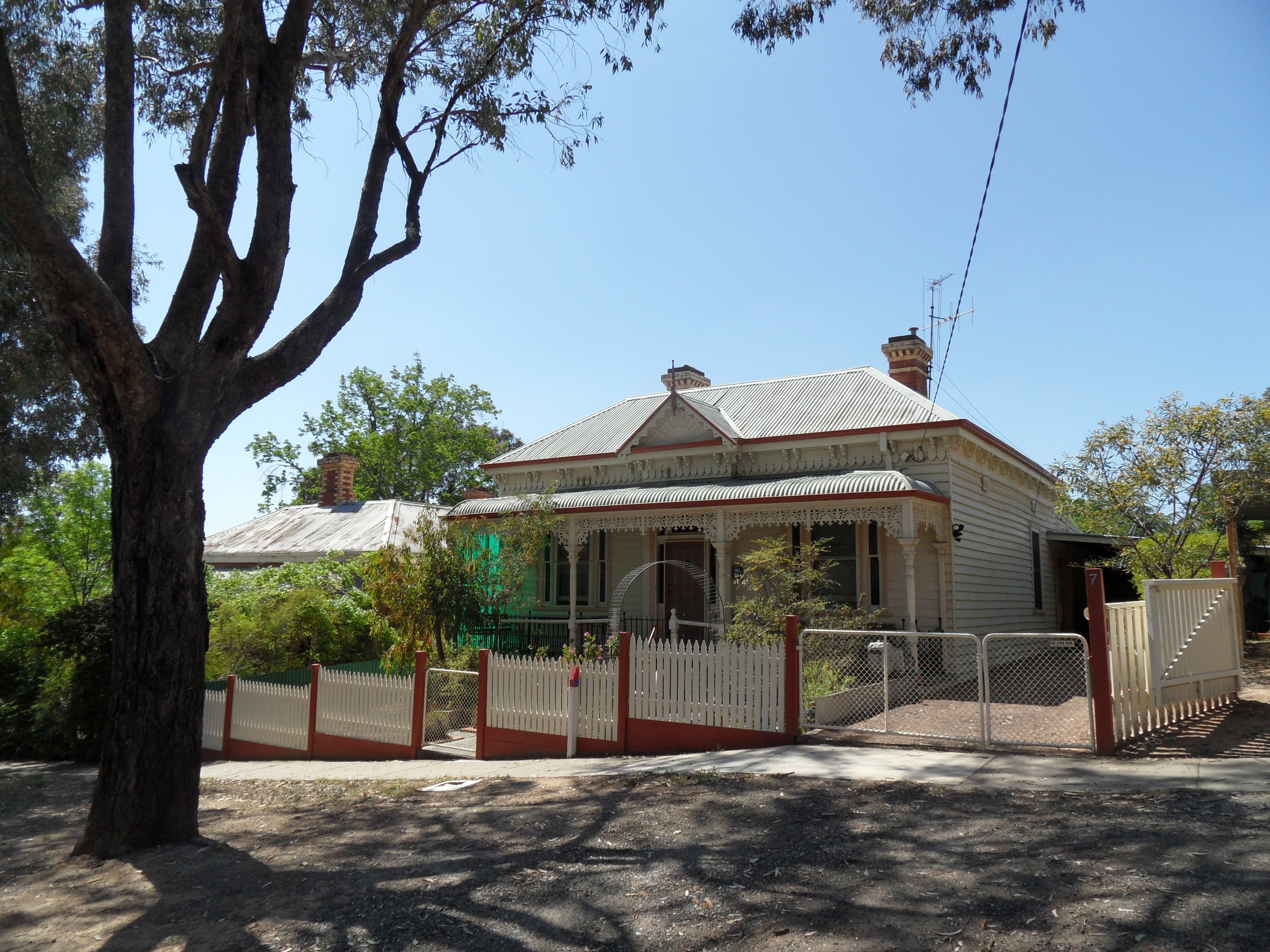
A typical 19th Century cottage in Quarry Hill

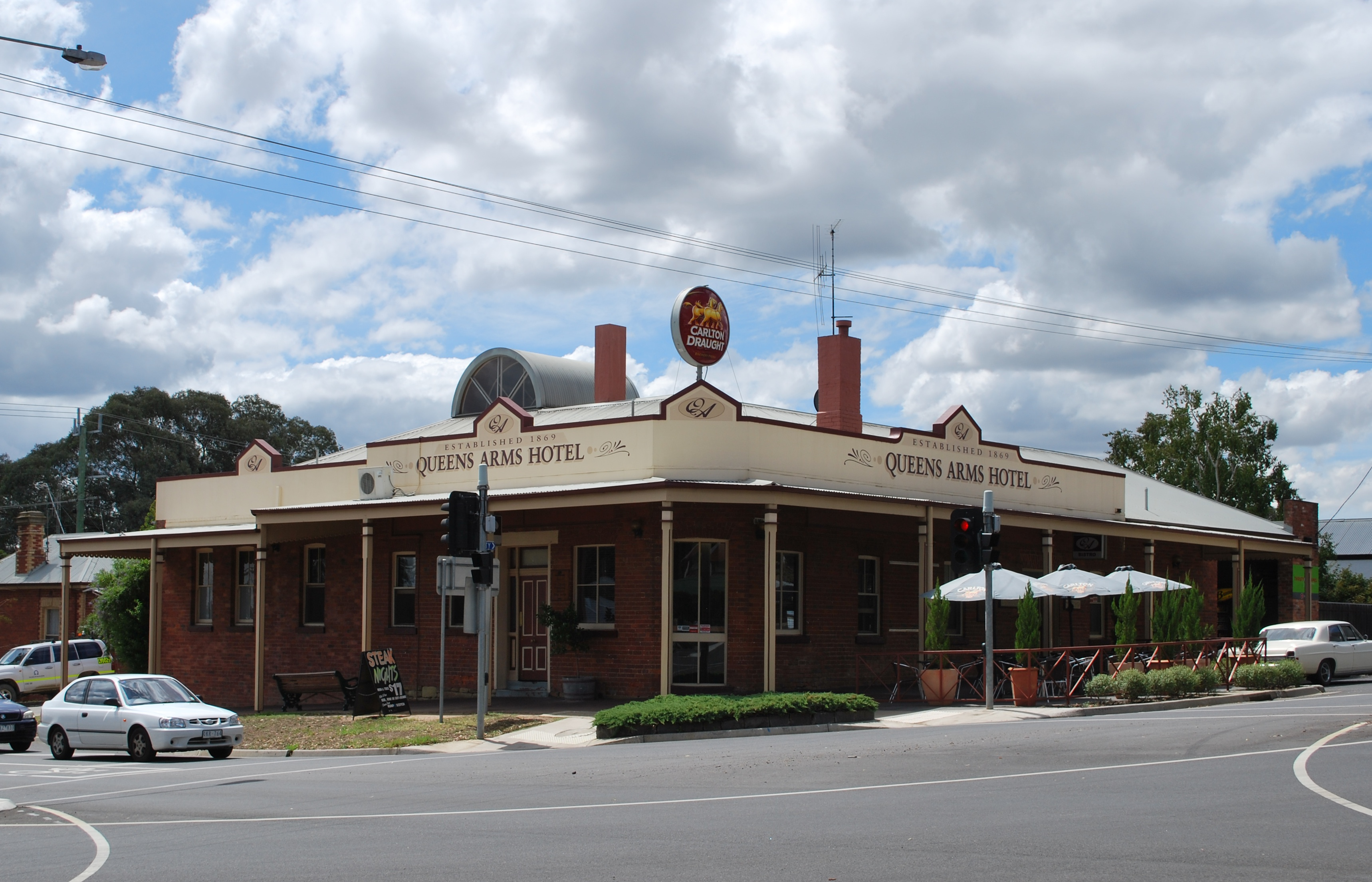
The Queens Arms Hotel
