= Lady Kennaway (1816 ship) =

History

United Kingdom
- Owner: 1816:Kyd & Co., Calcutta; 1823:Palmer & Co.; 1823:George Joad; 1831:George Frederick Young.; 1838:Thomas Ward, London.
- Builder: Kyd & Co., Kidderpore, Calcutta
- Launched: 21 November 1816
- Fate: Wrecked 25 November 1857

General characteristics
- Tons burthen: 542, or 573, or 583, or 584, or 600 (bm)
- Length: 121 ft 0 in (36.9 m) x 32'7.
- Beam: 32 ft 7 in (9.9 m)
- Notes: Teak built

Lady Kennaway was launched in Calcutta in 1816. In 1819 and thereafter she sailed between England and India under a license from the British East India Company (EIC). In 1823 she was sold in London. She made three voyages under charter to the EIC. In 1835 and again in 1851 she made voyages transporting convicts to Tasmania. On one voyage some of the convicts were young men for the Pankhurst apprentice scheme. In between, in 1836, she transported convicts to New South Wales. She made five voyages carrying immigrants to Australia, including young Irish women for the Earl Grey Irish Famine Orphan scheme. In 1847 her crew abandoned her in the Bay of Biscay although she seemed to have sustained little damage; she was salvaged and returned to service. She was finally wrecked on 25 November 1857 at South Africa.

== Career ==
In 1819 Lady Kennaway appeared in the Registry of Calcutta with John Mee, master, and Kyd & Co., owners. On 12 November she arrived at Gravesend, having left Bengal on 29 May and St Helena on 1 September. On 4 June 1820 she was at Deal, preparatory to sailing to Mauritius, Madras, and Calcutta.

She first appeared in Lloyd's Register (LR) in 1820.

Year	Master	Owner	Trade	Source
1820	John Mee	Small & Co.	London–Madras	LR

On 10 February 1823 Lady Kennaway, Beach, master, arrived at Gravesend. She had left Bengal on 21 August 1823, Madras on 15 September, Trincomalee on 21 September, the Cape of Good Hope on 28 November, and St Helena on 11 December.

In April 1823 Lady Kennaway was sold in London for £7,2000. She still appeared in the Calcutta Registry in 1824, with C.Beach, master, and Palmer & Co., owners.

Year	Master	Owner	Trade	Source
1823	C.Beach; Surflen	Snell & Co. Joad & Co.	London–Bengal	LR

Joad & Co. appointed Captain Thomas Surflen master of Lady Kennaway. Surflen had been master of two other Joad vessels, Alexander, and an earlier Alexander.

On 17 June 1825 Lady Kennaway, Surflen, master, sailed for Bombay with the 2nd, or Queen's Regiment. She returned to Gravesend on 26 February 1826.

EIC voyage #1 (1826): Captain Thomas Surflen sailed from Torbay on 22 July 1826 and arrived at Calcutta on 27 November. She carried some officers and 160 privates for His Majesty's service.

EIC voyage #2 (1828–1829): Captain Thomas Delafons sailed from the Downs on 7 June 1828, bound for China and Canada. Lady Kennaway arrived at Whampoa Anchorage on 8 November. On her return voyage she crossed the Second Bar on 21 January 1829. She reached Ascension Island on 4 April and arrived at Halifax, Nova Scotia on 11 May.

EIC voyage #3 (1830–1831): Captain Lewis W. Moncreieff (or Moncrieff) sailed from the Downs on 2 June 1830, bound for Madras and Bengal. Lady Kennaway reached Madras on 26 September and arrived at Calcutta on 10 October. Homeward bound, she reached St Helena on 19 March 1831 and arrived back at the Downs on 2 June. She carried companies of the 75th Regiment of Foot.

1st convict voyage (1835): Captain Thomas Bolton sailed from Cork on 27 October 1834. Lady Kennaway arrived at Hobart on 13 February 1835. She embarked 311 male convicts and suffered 19 convict deaths on the voyage. She landed 274 at Hobart. She had embarked 100 men from Norfolk at Woolwich, and then took on another 180 men at Portsmouth. She left Portsmouth on 30 June 1834 and sailed to Cork, where she took on another 31, bringing her total number of convicts to 311. There was a great deal of sickness on the way to Cork, the men from Norfolk in particular being in particularly ill-health. Seventeen men died at Cork, and 18 sick men were landed at Haulbowline Island. Between Cork and Tasmania only two men died.

2nd convict voyage (1836): Captain Robert P. Davidson sailed from the Downs on 11 June 1836. Lady Kennaway arrived at Sydney on 12 October. She had embarked 300 men, of whom two died during the voyage.

Lady Kennaway sailed from Leith Roads on 19 April 1838 and arrived in Sydney on 11 August 1838. She carried 283 immigrants. Seven infants died on the voyage and there were seven live births.

Lady Kennaway, Captain J.L. Spence, left Plymouth on 13 June 1841, having come from London. She carried 256 immigrants to Sydney, arriving there on 12 October.

Maritime incident: Lady Kennaway, Captain Avery, master, sailed from Bombay on 27 June 1847. In November her crew abandoned Lady Kennaway in the Atlantic Ocean 200 nautical miles (370 km) west of the Isles of Scilly. All on board were rescued by the Belgian corvette La Meuse and a Guernsey vessel. She was discovered on 19 November at 48°2′N 8°31′W by the Danish brig Industrie, of Aalborg, Christopherson, master, and barque Naiaden, of Copenhagen, Schyt or Schutz, master, which attempted to take her in tow. Industrie had to abandon the tow on 22 November when Industrie became leaky; Industrie then made for Falmouth, Cornwall, leaving Naiaden in company with Lady Kennaway, which had some crew from Naiaden on board. On 24 November HMS Dolphin, commander lieutenant the Honourable R.F.Boyle, which was on her way to the coast of Africa, arrived and put a midshipman and seven men aboard Lady Kennaway as well. Naiadenleft on 28 November and arrived at Falmouth on 30 November. On 1 December the Plymouth pilot took Lady Kennaway in tow, handing her over to the steam tug HMS Confiance, which towed Lady Kennaway in to Plymouth Sound on 2 December. The Danes claimed £105,000 in salvage, half the value of her cargo. Dolphin also submitted a claim of £35,000 for salvage. Surveyors found that Lady Kennaway had sustained little damage and had little water in her hold, raising questions as to why Avery and his 35 man crew had abandoned her. (Note: In September 1849 Lieutenant Boyle was awarded £134 16s 3d. The midshipman was awarded £67 8s. A 13th class share, the lowest level, was worth £2 10s 6½d. The navy men who were on board Lady Kennaway received, depending on their rating, either a 10th class share worth £6 14s 9¾d or a 12th class share worth £3 7s 4½d. They also each revived an extra 47 16s 6½d, or £23 18s 3¾d.)

Orphan transport (1848): After Lady Kennaway was repaired, Captain James Santry sailed her from Plymouth on 11 September 1848 for Port Phillip, Victoria. In addition to cargo, she carried 190 Irish girls orphaned by the Great Famine. She was one of six vessels that brought some 1700 orphans to Williamstown, Victoria under the auspices of Earl Grey's Irish Famine Orphan scheme. (Note: The other five were Pemberton, Diadem, New Liverpool, Derwent, and Eliza Caroline. Another 2300 travelled in other vessels to Adelaide and Sydney. The term "orphan" also applied to children in a workhouse because their parents could not support them.) Lady Kennaway arrived in December.

Lady Kennaway also arrived in Port Phillip on 25 February 1850. She had come from Plymouth, having left there on 2 November 1849. From Port Phillip she sailed on to Geelong, arriving there on 2 March. Among the immigrants there were some 50 to 60 single Irish girls.

3rd convict voyage (1851): Captain J. Santry sailed from the Isle of Wight on 23 January 1851 with 47 Parkhurst apprentices, juveniles from a reformatory attached to Parkhurst Prison on the Isle of Wight. She left Portsmouth on 5 February 1851 and arrived at Tasmania on 28 May. She carried some 250 convicts, one of whom died on the voyage. Thirty-three Parkhurst boys disembarked in Tasmania; the remaining 14 reportedly travelled on to Norfolk Island.

Lady Kennaway sailed from Southampton on 9 May 1853 and arrived in Melbourne on 15 August. In addition to cargo she brought 274 emigrants, all of whom were in good health; three infants died on the voyage.

On 12 September 1854 Captain J.H. Young sailed from Plymouth, bound for Sydney. He had a crew of 33 men, plus a surgeon and was carrying 304 passengers, of whom 159 were single women, probably Irish orphans. Lady Kennaway arrived 9 December 1854.

== Fate ==
In 1857 Lady Kennaway was refused Lloyd's classification as she was considered unseaworthy. Nevertheless, she sailed for Cape Town and India.

Lady Kennaway was wrecked on 25 November 1857 at East London, Cape Colony. All on board survived. She was on a voyage from London, England to East London and Calcutta.

Apparently she was carrying about 153 single Irish women and 21 couples 36 children, for a total of 231 immigrants who then settled in British Kaffraria. They had been safely landed before she was wrecked. A commission appointed to investigate the loss attributed it to "great mismanagement or neglect, or both."
