= Burnie Football Association =

Australian rules football league

- Most recent season or competition: 1937
- Sport: Australian rules football
- Founded: 1906
- Folded: 1937
- No. of teams: 5 (1937), 28 (historical)
- Country: Australia
- Last champion: Wynyard (1937)

The Burnie Football Association was an Australian rules football competition based around the town of Burnie in north-west Tasmania.

== History ==
The competition began as the Burnie Junior Football League in 1906 as a local competition for small clubs based in and around Burnie. The original clubs were Mooreville, Ridgley, Romaine and Yeoman. Wanderers won the 1908 premiership, however it was awarded to Ridgley after they successfully argued that Wanderers had played an ineligible player. The line-up of clubs underwent change almost every year, and by 1911 Wynyard and Wanderers had replaced Cam, Yolla, Romaine and Mooreville. Wanderers, Wynyard and Railway all departed after 1912, leaving only three clubs in the competition. The BJFL went into recess in 1916 due to the detrimental effect of World War I on the number of available players.

The League was re-established as the Burnie Junior Football Association in 1919 with four clubs - 90B Cadets, Romaine, Stowport and Mooreville. By 1923 the BJFA featured 7 clubs, however the defection of clubs to the Emu Bay Football Association saw the BJFA enter recess in 1927, although it would return a year later in 1928. In 1932 the competition was reconstituted into the Burnie Football Association, comprising both a senior and junior section, although this would only last 1 season. The 1937 season would be the last year of the BFA. A farcical situation saw only Cooee, Old Scholars and Wynyard play out the season after Somerset and Southern United both dropped out partway through the competition. Cooee and Wynyard would go on to form the Darwin Football Association in 1938, while Old Scholars folded.

== Clubs ==
=== Final ===
Club	Colours	Nickname	Home Ground	Former league	Est.	Years in BFA	BFA Senior Premierships		Fate
Club	Colours	Nickname	Home Ground	Former league	Est.	Years in BFA	Total	Years	Fate
Cooee	(1921–24)(1930–37)	Bulldogs	West Park Oval, Burnie	BJFA	1894	1921-1922, 1924, 1930–1937	5	1931, 1933, 1934, 1935, 1936	Recess in 1923 and 1925–29. Formed Darwin FA in 1938.
Old Scholars			West Park Oval, Burnie	–	1932	1932-1937	0	-	Folded after 1937 season
Somerset					1923	1934, 1937	0	-	Folded during 1937 season
Southern United			Wivenhoe Showgrounds, Wivenhoe	–	1937	1937	0	-	Folded during 1937 season
Wynyard		Cats	Wynyard Oval, Wynyard	WFA, TCFA	1885	1910-1912, 1914–1915, 1937	2	1915, 1937	Formed Darwin FA in 1938.

=== Former ===
Club	Colours	Nickname	Home Ground	Former league	Est.	Years in BFA	BFA Senior Premierships		Fate
Club	Colours	Nickname	Home Ground	Former league	Est.	Years in BFA	Total	Years	Fate
90B Cadets			None	–	1919	1919	0	-	Folded after 1919 season
Burnie (Romaine 1906-09)			West Park Oval, Burnie	NWFU	1885	1906-1910, 1920	0	-	Moved to NWFU in 1911 and in 1921
Burnie juniors		Tigers	West Park Oval, Burnie	TCFA	1885	1923, 1925–1926, 1928–1931	2	1926, 1928	Played in Table Cape FA in 1927.
Burnie Wanderers		Wanderers	West Park Oval, Burnie	EWFA	1905	1907-1912, 1915	2	1911, 1912	Played in NWFU in 1913–14. Folded after 1915 season
Cam				–	1907	1907	0	-	Folded after 1907 season.
City			Wivenhoe Showgrounds, Wivenhoe	–	1932	1932	1	1932	Recess between 1933 and 1937, re-formed in Darwin FA in 1938.
Emu Bay			West Park Oval, Burnie			1915	0	-	Folded after 1915 season
Emy Bay Rovers			West Park Oval, Burnie	–	1928	1928-1931	0	-	Folded after 1931 season
High School			West Park Oval, Burnie	–	1932	1932-1933	0	-	Folded after 1933 season
Mooreville	(1919) (1920–23)		West Mooreville Recreation Ground, West Mooreville	–	1906	1906, 1919–1923	0	-	Recess between 1907 and 1918. Folded after 1923 season
Mooreville Rovers			West Mooreville Recreation Ground, West Mooreville	–	1921	1921-1923	0	-	Folded after 1923 season
Oonah		Dashers	Oonah Recreation Ground, Oonah	EBFL	1920	1924-1925, 1928	0	-	Played in Emu Bay FL in 1926–27. Recess between 1929 and 1931, re-formed in Highclere FA in 1932.
Railway			West Park Oval, Burnie			1912, 1915	0	-	Recess in 1913–14, folded after 1915 season
Ridgley	(1906, 1920)(?-1936)	Reds	Ridgley Sports Ground, Ridgley		1891	1906-1911, 1913-1915, 1919-1920, 1923-1927, 1929-1932, 1935-1936	6	1908, 1909, 1923, 1924, 1925, 1930	Recesses in 1912, 1916–18, 1921–22, and 1928. Moved to Highclere FA in 1932 and Ridgley FA in 1937
Romaine (2)			Romaine Recreation Reserve, Romaine	–	1919	1919	0	-	Folded after 1919 season
Romaine (3)			Romaine Recreation Reserve, Romaine	EBFL	1926	1928-1930, 1933	1	1929	Recess in 1931–32. Folded after 1933 season
Shamrocks			West Park Oval, Burnie	–	1913	1913	0	-	Folded after 1913 season
Stowport	(1920)(?-1936)	Tigers	Stowport Football Ground, Stowport	CFA	1903	1919-1926, 1928, 1931, 1935–1936	2	1919, 1920	Played in Emu Bay FL in 1927. Recess in 1929–30. Played in Cuprona FA between 1932 and 1934. Entered recess in 1937, re-formed in Cuprona FA in 1945
Upper Burnie	(1922)		Upper Burnie Recreation Ground, Upper Burnie	–	1922	1922-1926, 1932–1934	0	-	Recess between 1927–31 and 1934–39. Re-formed Darwin FA in 1940
Wivenhoe	(1922–23) (1924–32)		Wivenhoe Showgrounds, Wivenhoe	–	1922	1922-1924, 1929, 1932–1934	0	-	Recess between 1925–28 and 1930–31. Folded after 1934 season
Yeoman		Robins	Elliott Football Ground, Elliott	TCFA	1895	1906-1915, 1934	1	1907, 1910, 1913, 1914	Joined NWFU after WWI. Entered recess after 1934 season, re-formed in Table Cape FA in 1938.
Yeoman juniors		Robins	Elliott Football Ground, Elliott		1895	1920-1922, 1928	1	1922	?
Yolla (1)			Yolla Recreation Ground, Yolla	WFA	1907	1908, 1921–1922	1	1921	Joined Wynyard FA in 1909. Joined Table Cape FA in 1923.

== Premierships ==
Year	Premier	Score	Runners-up	Notes
1906	?		?	
1907	Yeoman	4.5 (29) - 3.6 (24)	Ridgley	
1908	Ridgley		Burnie Wanderers	Ridgley awarded premiership after successfully protesting that Wanderers played an ineligible player in the final.
1909	Ridgley		?	
1910	Yeoman	4.5 (29) - 2.12 (24)	Burnie Wanderers	
1911	Burnie Wanderers	17.13 (115) - 5.10 (40)	Wynyard	
1912	Burnie Wanderers	12.15 (87) - 8.10 (58)	Railways	
1913	Yeoman		?	No grand final
1914	Yeoman		?	No grand final
1915	Wynyard		Ridgley	No grand final
1916-18	BFA in recess (WWI)			
1919	Stowport		Mooreville	
1920	Stowport		Yeoman juniors	Final not played - Yeoman refused to play under the chosen umpire, thus forfeiting the premiership.
1921	Yolla	5.3 (33) - 2.7 (19)	Stowport	
1922	Yeoman juniors	3.7 (25) - 3.4 (22)	Cooee	
1923	Ridgley	5.16 (46) - 7.5 (45)	Upper Burnie	
1924	Ridgley	9.10 (64) - 4.10 (34)	Upper Burnie	
1925	Ridgley	7.6 (48) - 3.15 (33)	Burnie juniors	
1926	Burnie juniors	7.15 (57) - 5.15 (45)	Upper Burnie	
1927	BFA in recess			
1928	Burnie Juniors	9.10 (64) - 4.10 (34)	Romaine	
1929	Romaine	13.9 (87) - 4.12 (36)	Ridgley	
1930	Ridgley	12.11 (83) - 7.12 (54)	Cooee	
1931	Cooee	11.16 (82) - 6.10 (46)	Burnie Juniors	
1932	City	13.20 (98) - 13.14 (92)	Cooee	
1933	Cooee	5.16 (946) - 4.10 (34)	Old Scholars	
1934	Cooee	11.5 (71) - 9.9 (63)	Old Scholars	
1935	Cooee	12.13 (85) - 8.13 (61)	Stowport	
1936	Cooee	7.12 (54) - 5.9 (39)	Stowport	
1937	Wynyard	15.10 (100) - 10.10 (70)	Old Scholars	
