= Table Cape Football Association =

Australian rules football league

- Most recent season or competition: 1952
- Sport: Australian rules football
- Founded: 1923
- Folded: 1952
- No. of teams: 3 (1952), 15 (historical)
- Country: Australia
- Last champion: Flowerdale (1952)

The Table Cape Football Association was an Australian rules football competition based around the town of Wynyard in north-west Tasmania.

== History ==
The Table Cape Football Association was formed in 1923 as a replacement for the Central Wellington Football Association. It provided a competition for smaller clubs based in and around Wynyard. The initial roster consisted of Flowerdale, Wynyard juniors, Yeoman (Elliott) and Yolla. The TCFA would have a volatile roster throughout its history, with almost every season seeing at least one club leave and be replaced by another. Boat Harbour joined for one season in 1924, replacing Flowerdale and Myalla, who joined the Association but failed to attend their first roster match. A year later they would drop out and be replaced by Somerset. Burnie Juniors joined for one season in 1927, replacing Somerset who had a year in recess. They won the premiership in their only season in the TCFA. 1927 would be the only year between 1925 and 1931 in which Yeoman failed to win the premiership - a run that included four straight premierships from 1928-1931.

Seabrook, Somerset and Wanderers all joined the TCFA in 1928. Yolla did not compete in 1928 but returned a year later, along with Flowerdale, giving the TCFA 6 clubs. Significant change occurred in the line-up of clubs between 1932 and 1934, with Rocky Cape, Boat Harbour, Wynyard and Henrietta Rovers all joining during this period. Yeoman and Flowerdale both dropped out, along with Gymnasium who played two seasons in 1932 and 1933. Seabrook folded during the 1936 season and Wynyard returned to the NWFU in 1937, leaving the TCFA with four clubs. The Association entered recess before the 1940 season as a result of WWII.

1946 saw the TCFA re-form, with Boat Harbour, Myalla, Rocky Cape and new club Mount Hicks forming the roster. Flowerdale re-formed in 1949, replacing Boat Harbour. The TCFA was reduced to 3 clubs in 1952 after Rocky Cape departed to the Circular Head Football Association, and at season's end it was decided to wind up the Association in favour of fielding a combined team under the Myalla name in the Darwin Football Association.

== Clubs ==
=== Final ===
| Club | Colours | Nickname | Home Ground | Former league | Est. | Years in TCFA | TCFA Senior Premierships | | Fate |
| Club | Colours | Nickname | Home Ground | Former league | Est. | Years in TCFA | Total | Years | Fate |
|---|---|---|---|---|---|---|---|---|---|
| Flowerdale | Dark with light vee | | Flowerdale Recreation Ground, Flowerdale | – | 1894 | 1923, 1929-1932, 1949-1952 | 2 | 1950, 1952 | Recess between 1924-28 and 1933-48. Absorbed by Myalla after 1952 season |
| Mount Hicks | | | Mount Hicks Recreation Ground, Mount Hicks | – | 1946 | 1946-1952 | 1 | 1951 | Folded after 1952 season |
| Myalla | | Tigers | Myalla Recreation Ground, Sisters Creek | – | 1912 | 1924, 1930-1939, 1946-1952 | 4 | 1932, 1938, 1939, 1948 | Recess between 1925-29 and 1940-45. Moved to Darwin FA in 1953 |

=== Former ===
| Club | Colours | Nickname | Home Ground | Former league | Est. | Years in TCFA | TCFA Senior Premierships | | Fate |
| Club | Colours | Nickname | Home Ground | Former league | Est. | Years in TCFA | Total | Years | Fate |
|---|---|---|---|---|---|---|---|---|---|
| Boat Harbour | | | Boat Harbour Recreation Ground, Boat Harbour | DFA | 1908 | 1924, 1933-1939, 1946-1948 | 2 | 1937, 1947 | Entered recess in 1925. Joined Darwin FA in 1940. Folded after 1948 season |
| Burnie Juniors | | Tigers | West Park Oval, Burnie | BFA | 1885 | 1927 | 1 | 1927 | Returned to Burnie FA in 1928 |
| Gymnasium | White with dark stripes | | Wynyard Football Ground, Wynyard | – | 1932 | 1932-1933 | 0 | - | Folded after 1933 season |
| Henrietta Rovers | | | Yolla Recreation Ground, Yolla | – | 1934 | 1934-1939 | 0 | - | Folded after 1939 season |
| Rocky Cape | Dark with lighter yoke | | Rocky Cape Recreation Ground, Rocky Cape | – | 1898 | 1932-1937, 1939, 1946-1951 | 2 | 1946, 1949 | Recess in 1938. Joined Circular Head FA junior comp in 1952. |
| Seabrook | Light with dark trim | | Wynyard Football Ground, Wynyard | – | 1928 | 1928-1936 | 2 | 1933, 1934 | Folded after 1936 season |
| Somerset | | | | – | 1923 | 1924-1926, 1928-1929 | 0 | - | Recess in 1927 and 1930-33, joined Burnie FA in 1934. |
| Wanderers | | | | – | 1928 | 1928-1930 | 0 | - | Folded after 1930 season |
| Wynyard | | Cats | Wynyard Football Ground, Wynyard | NWFU | 1885 | 1934-1936 | 2 | 1935, 1936 | Returned to Burnie FA in 1937 |
| Wynyard juniors | | Cats | Wynyard Football Ground, Wynyard | – | 1885 | 1923-1928 | 1 | 1923 | ? |
| Yeoman | | Robins | Elliott Oval, Elliott | NWFU | 1895 | 1923-1933, 1938-1939 | 6 | 1925, 1926, 1928, 1929, 1930, 1931 | Recess between 1934-37. Joined Darwin FA in 1940. |
| Yolla (1) | | | Yolla Recreation Ground, Yolla | BFA | 1920 | 1923-1927, 1929-1930 | 1 | 1924 | Recess in 1928. Folded after 1930 season |

== Premierships ==
| Year | Premier | Score | Runners-up | Notes |
|---|---|---|---|---|
| 1923 | Wynyard juniors | 5.12 (42) - 4.14 (38) | Yeoman | |
| 1924 | Yolla | 3.12 (30) - 4.0 (24) | Wynyard juniors | |
| 1925 | Yeoman | 7.14 (56) - 3.9 (27) | Somerset | |
| 1926 | Yeoman | 9.11 (65) - 3.4 (22) | Wynyard juniors | |
| 1927 | Burnie juniors | 12.18 (90) - 1.8 (14) | Yolla | |
| 1928 | Yeoman | 8.20 (68) - 3.5 (23) | Wynyard juniors | |
| 1929 | Yeoman | 5.5 (35) - 3.4 (22) | Wanderers | |
| 1930 | Yeoman | 7.13 (55) - 6.5 (41) | Myalla | |
| 1931 | Yeoman | 8.16 (64) - 7.10 (52) | Flowerdale | |
| 1932 | Myalla | 10.4 (64) - 7.13 (55) | Seabrook | |
| 1933 | Seabrook | 9.13 (67) - 4.6 (30) | Gymnasium | |
| 1934 | Seabrook | 5.10 (40) - 3.7 (25) | Wynyard | |
| 1935 | Wynyard | 11.11 (77) - 9.9 (63) | Seabrook | |
| 1936 | Wynyard | 9.11 (65) - 5.9 (39) | Boat Harbour | |
| 1937 | Boat Harbour | 6.10 (46) - 3.3 (21) | Myalla | |
| 1938 | Myalla | 4.8 (32) - 1.4 (10) | Boat Harbour | |
| 1939 | Myalla | 6.9 (45) - 5.5 (35) | Boat Harbour | |
| 1940-45 | TCFA in recess (WWII) | | | |
| 1946 | Rocky Cape | 8.10 (58) - 7.7 (49) | Myalla | |
| 1947 | Boat Harbour | 10.11 (71) - 4.14 (38) | Myalla | |
| 1948 | Myalla | 6.11 (47) - 6.9 (45) | Rocky Cape | |
| 1949 | Rocky Cape | 7.5 (47) - 4.3 (27) | Myalla | |
| 1950 | Flowerdale | 9.7 (61) - 8.11 (59) | Myalla | |
| 1951 | Mount Hicks | 5.11 (41) - 3.4 (22) | Myalla | |
| 1952 | Flowerdale | ? | Mount Hicks | |
