= Camdale =

- Suburb
- Interactive map of Camdale
- Coordinates: 41°02′35″S 145°50′51″E
- Country: Australia
- State: Tasmania
- Region: North West Tasmania
- City: Burnie
- LGA: Burnie
- Location: 7.5 km (4.7 mi) W of Burnie

Government
  - State electorate: Braddon
  - Federal division: Braddon

Population
  - Total: 72 (2016 census)
- Postcode: 7320
Suburbs around Camdale
| Bass Strait | Bass Strait | Bass Strait |
| Somerset | Camdale | Ocean Vista |
| Somerset | East Cam | East Cam |

Camdale is a locality and small rural community in the local government area of Burnie, in the North West region of Tasmania. It is located about 7.5 kilometres (4.7 mi) west of the town of Burnie. The Cam River forms its western boundary, Bass Strait the northern boundary, and the Bass Highway follows the northern boundary. The 2016 census determined a population of 72 for the state suburb of Camdale.

== History ==
The locality of Somerset, to the west of the Cam River, was originally known as Port Maldon. An 1858 map shows Port Maldon to the east of the river, on part of the current locality of Camdale. In 1960 the then Municipality of Burnie proposed the name “Maldon” for the locality.

== Road infrastructure ==
The C109 route (East Cam Road) terminates at the Bass Highway in Camdale. It runs south to East Cam, and from there provides access to many localities, including Waratah.

== Native wildlife ==
The coast of Bass Strait at Camdale is a location where little penguins come ashore. Local volunteers build and maintain fences to prevent them from attempting to cross the Bass Highway, where some have been killed.

== Sporting facilities ==
The Burnie Golf Club, whose course occupies land in East Cam to the south, is accessed from Camdale.
