= Yolla =

Yolla may refer to:

- Yolla, Tasmania, Australia
  - Yolla District High School
  - Yolla Football Club
- Yolla, Tasmanian Aboriginal word for short-tailed shearwater
- Yolla Bolly-Middle Eel Wilderness, wilderness area west of Red Bluff, California, United States
- Yolla Yuliana, Indonesian women volleyball player
- Yolla, iOS and Android app for international calls
- Yowlah (also spelled "yolla"), a traditional dance of the United Arab Emirates and Oman
