= West Mooreville =

- Town
- Coordinates: 41°06′36″S 145°50′17″E
- Country: Australia
- State: Tasmania
- Region: North-west and west
- LGA: Burnie
- Location: 9 km (5.6 mi) SW of Burnie

Government
  - State electorate: Braddon
  - Federal division: Braddon

Population
  - Total: 114 (2016 census)
- Postcode: 7321
Localities around West Mooreville
Somerset	East Cam	Mooreville
Elliott	West Mooreville	Mooreville
Elliott	Ridgley, West Ridgley	Moorville

West Mooreville is a rural locality in the local government area (LGA) of Burnie in the North-west and west LGA region of Tasmania. The locality is about 9 kilometres (5.6 mi) south-west of the town of Burnie. The 2016 census recorded a population of 114 for the state suburb of West Mooreville.

== History ==
West Mooreville is a confirmed locality.

== Geography ==
The Cam River forms the western boundary.

== Road infrastructure ==
Route C108 (West Mooreville Road) runs through from north to south.
