= East Cam =

- Suburb
- Interactive map of East Cam
- Coordinates: 41.06°S 145.85°E
- Country: Australia
- State: Tasmania
- Region: North-west and west
- City: Burnie
- LGA: City of Burnie
- Location: 6 km (3.7 mi) SW of Burnie

Government
  - State electorate: Braddon
  - Federal division: Braddon

Population
  - Total: 170 (2016)
- Postcode: 7320
Suburbs around East Cam
| Somerset | Camdale, Ocean Vista | Cooee |
| Somerset | East Cam | Parklands |
| Mooreville | Mooreville, West Mooreville | Shorewell Park |

East Cam is a semi-rural locality in the local government area (LGA) of Burnie in the North-west and west LGA region of Tasmania. The locality is about 6 kilometres (3.7 mi) south-west of the town of Burnie. The 2016 census recorded a population of 170 for the state suburb of East Cam. The Burnie Golf Club is located within the suburb. The suburb is also the location for the Burnie Lawn Cemetery and as such there is a funeral home also located within the suburb. Forestry Tasmania have an office located in East Cam, there is a storage centre and there is also a vehicle repair centre.

== History ==
East Cam is a confirmed locality.

== Geography ==
The Cam River forms most of the western boundary. Cooee Creek forms most of the eastern boundary. Messengers Creek flows through from south to north.

== Road infrastructure ==
The C108 route (West Mooreville Road) passes through from north-east to south. Route C109 (East Cam Road) starts at an intersection with C108 and runs north-west until it exits.
