= South Burnie Football Club =

Names
- Full name: South Burnie Football Club
- Nickname: Hawks

Club details
- Founded: 1941; 85 years ago
- Colours: Brown Gold
- Competition: Darwin Football Association
- President: N. Hayes
- Coach: J. Collins
- Premierships: NWFU/DFA (18): 1945, 1949, 1954, 1959, 1962, 1967, 1968, 1994, 1995, 2004, 2012, 2013, 2015, 2016, 2017, 2018, 2023, 2025
- Ground: Wivenhoe

Uniforms
Home

The South Burnie Football Club is an Australian rules football club, based in the town of Burnie, Tasmania. It currently competes in the Darwin Football Association (DFA), and is the most successful club in DFA history. The club was initially known as APPM (for Associated Pulp and Paper Mills Ltd.), and was formed in 1941, five years after the Burnie pulp factory itself. After competing in the DFA in 1941, the disbanding of the league in 1944 resulted in the club being admitted to the North West Football Union (NWFU) in 1945. The club rejoined the reformed DFA as a founding member in 1951, deciding to change its name from APPM to South Burnie in 1956. After a two-year stint in the Northern Tasmanian Football League (NTFL) in 1997–1998, the hawks returned to the DFA and enjoyed a sustained period of success. From 2000 to 2019, the senior team reached the finals every season, playing 11 Grand Finals and winning 7 premierships. The club's reserves team in the same period played in 17 Grand Finals, winning 14 premierships including an incredible unbeaten streak of 11 flags from 2006 to 2016. The club holds the most senior premierships in the DFA with 16.

== History ==
The club was nicknamed ‘the pulp’ after being born from the APPM paper mill in 1941, its colours being maroon and gold. The club first competed in the DFA for season 1941, the Emu Bay Association in 1942, the Burnie Junior Association in 1943, and once again in the DFA in 1944. Then from 1945 until 1951 the club competed in the NWFU. Its 1945 debut season in the NWFU saw APPM claim its first ever premiership with a 31-point, 13.16 (94) to 8.15 (63) Grand Final defeat of East Devonport. Four years later in 1949 it again tasted premiership success, this time at the expense of Ulverstone, winning on this occasion by 27 points after trailing at three-quarter time, 14.12 (96) to 9.15 (69). Two years later in 1951 the club joined the reformed DFA as a founding member, in the end spending only six seasons in the NWFU, but reaping 2 premierships during that tenure.

After rejoining the DFA, success soon followed with the pulp claiming the 1954 premiership after finishing fourth on the ladder, winning by the closest possible margin of 1 point against top side Montello 6. 9. (45) to 6. 8. (44). This was the last flag won by APPM, after a decision was taken by the club to change its name two seasons following this maiden DFA premiership. “The name change of South Burnie occurred at the start of the 1956 season, when it was obvious that more players would come from different areas of employment and it made sense to identify with the surrounding suburb.” In addition the club changed its strip from maroon and gold to brown and gold, while representing themselves as the hawks.

This appears to have been a good decision, as the club went on to win the 1959 premiership against Yeoman by 14 points, followed by a successful run in the sixties, winning 3 premierships. The first of those was in 1962 against Cam (now Somerset) by 17 points, 11. 12. (78) to 8. 13. (61). Five seasons later the club won back-to-back premierships at the expense of Ridgley, beginning with the 1967 victory of 31 points 15. 11. (101) to 11. 4. (70). The 1968 rematch was won by a margin of 39 points, 14. 9. (93) to 8. 6. (54). This was however to be the last time South Burnie would taste glory for another two and a half decades, the seventies proving the worst period in club history with three wooden spoons (last place). The eighties proved slightly better, with a Grand Final appearance in 1984 though losing by 22 points to a Yolla team that dominated that decade. The reserves team however earned its first premiership with a 33-point victory over Yolla in 1987, going back-to-back with a narrow 5 point victory over the same club in 1988. It was not until the nineteen nineties that South Burnie would overcome this unsuccessful, frustrating era.

In season 1994, and after 26 years without a senior Grand Final victory, the hawks finally broke their premiership drought in style with convincing back-to-back flags in 1994–1995, first dispatching Somerset by 51 points, 15.18. (108) to 8.9. (57), backed up by an 87-point hammering of West Ulverstone, 22.16. (148) to 7.19. (61), the club's greatest ever winning margin in a Grand Final, and also the DFA record margin at that time. Shortly after these successes the club decided to try its luck at a higher level in the NTFL for season 1997, however, this venture proved unsuccessful and difficult to sustain, and following the end of the 1998 season, the hawks returned to the DFA for season 1999.

The turn of the millennium coincided with the club gaining momentum to what would become the most dominant period in its history, beginning with a grand final appearance in 2001 although losing heavily to a dominant Natone by 86 points, 18.20. (128) to 6.6. (42). The Under 17 youth team, however, collected its maiden premiership defeating Yeoman. In 2003 the club was again facing off in a grand final, though losing again albeit narrowly in a dour, low-scoring affair to Myalla, 4.5. (29) to 3.3. (21).

2004 however saw the club earn its 8th DFA premiership, overcoming Cuprona by 25 points, 12.6. (78) to 7.11. (53). Cuprona controlled the match until halfway through the third quarter, when they had a 20-point lead, but the hawks began to get on top and the margin became seven points at three quarter time. They continued their momentum into the last quarter to come away with the silverware, and many regarded this as the most even, skillful and entertaining Grand Final for years. They failed to back up their success the following year, although the Under 17 youth team was able to win its second premiership in 2005 defeating Devonport. The club earned a Grand Final berth in season 2006 but again lost the game, on this occasion to Yolla by a margin of 20 points, 10. 11. (71) to 7. 9. (53). From season 2006 however, the club's reserves side began their amazing streak of 11 consecutive premierships, stretching from 2006 to 2016, an achievement which may never be surpassed. The senior side however, although having its share of success and playing finals, frustratingly could not break through to another grand final until the 2012 season.

Following a fifth-place finish in 2011, the hawks finished the regular season in 2012 in second position, and earned a grand final berth against a Ridgley side which had only been beaten on two occasions. Facing a 31-point deficit at quarter time, the club clawed its way back, and then ran over the saints, in the end becoming premiers by 32 points and finally earning the ultimate reward for their consistent finals runs. 2012 also became the season that the club won the double for the first time in its history (both senior and reserves premiers), the reserves side also overcoming Ridgley to win its 7th consecutive flag.

2013 was a more complete season, the hawks dominating finishing atop the ladder. Although stumbling in the semi-final with a 4 Point loss to Ridgley, an 81-point Preliminary final win over Queenstown was backed up with a 50-point Grand Final victory again over the saints. As the reserves continued their premiership streak, the club earned back to back doubles for the first time in club, and DFA history. A dominant history making season for the South Burnie Football Club, and it appeared as though the form would continue into the following season as the club yearned to achieve a three peat. 2014 however saw the hawks attempt cut down. Although dominating the regular season again finishing atop the ladder for the second consecutive year, they could not overcome an inspired Queenstown in a nailbiting semi final, losing by just 2 points. Somerset then ended their season in unceremonious fashion in the preliminary final to the tune of 62 points.

In season 2015 however, the club returned once again to the grand final stage, this time against a skillful Somerset side which had finished the regular season on top of the ladder and dispatched the hawks in the semi-final by 32 points. The grand final itself “will go down in folklore as one of the greatest, if not the greatest.” After a poor first half the hawks were completely outplayed by the roos, and it appeared as though the game was over with a 43-point half time deficit. Halfway into the third quarter however, the hawks began to gain some momentum and couldn't be stopped, piling on the goals to narrow the margin to 10 points at three-quarter time. Early into the last stanza the momentum kept rolling, with the club hitting the front and gaining a 9-point lead before Somerset stemmed the flow, the remainder of the quarter going goal for goal with the roos finally regaining a 3-point lead with 2 minutes left in the match. But the hawks weren't done, and they managed to score a final goal with a minute remaining. The team coolly retained possession of the football in the dying seconds to deny Somerset the flag, and secured one of the greatest ever grand final comebacks to win the 2015 premiership by 3 points. The reserves in contrast dominated their grand final, winning by 81 points en route to their 10th consecutive premiership, and the club's third double in four seasons.

Following the exhilarating 2015 victory, the 2016 season began slowly for the hawks, with Natone surprising the competition, leading the ladder until the final game of the season when an incredible 158 point victory for the hawks over the magpies earned them top spot. From there the premiership was South's to lose. The hawks had incredibly not won a semi-final since 2006 from 6 attempts but with a hoodoo breaking semi-final win over Natone by 78 points, and a Grand Final win of 64 points again against the magpies, secured the club its 12th DFA premiership; its fourth in five years, its fourth double in five years, and assured its current status as the most successful club in DFA history to date. Coach Rohan Baldock capped off a successful season on an individual note, kicking 241 goals for the season, an effort which places him second on the all-time goal kicking record in a season in Australian football. The club also recorded its greatest ever winning margin in a game, 322 points against Yolla in round 18. 2016 thus put an exclamation mark on the most successful period in club history.

Although gun forward and coach Baldock departed the club for the 2017 season, the hawks fourth attempt at achieving the three peat began promisingly with the appointment of state league player Zane Murphy as senior coach. In round 8 Murphy equalled Alan Newman's 1987 record for most goals scored in a single game with 23. In round 16 the hawks' ruthlessness against the demons in recent years went to another level as they smashed their highest ever recorded score to 391 points, and greatest ever winning margin to 377 points. It was also the highest score in the DFA's 67-year history, 62.19 (391), eclipsing Natone's 58.32 (380) in 2001, with Zane Murphy (13 goals) and Kurt Lamprey (19 goals) also becoming the first two players to ever achieve the century goal kicking mark from the same club on the same day.

The club finished the regular season on top of the ladder, one game ahead of the Somerset Football Club, who had defeated the hawks in their past two meetings. The semi-final showdown was contested against the roos, under lights and in wet conditions where the hawks put on a dominant physical display to win by 55 points and book a third straight grand final appearance. On the eve of the grand final assistant coach Jake Brakey captured a record fourth Ewington medal as the best and fairest player in the DFA, also a club record. As it transpired, Somerset would again be their opponent from whom the hawks had snatched the 2015 premiership by 3 points.

In the 2017 DFA grand final, South Burnie put on another dominant performance, smashing the roos by a massive 138 points. They kicked a record grand final highest score of 23. 24. (162) which eclipsed the previous record, the 87 point and 22. 16. (148) win also achieved by South Burnie in 1995 when they defeated West Ulverstone. In addition the club finally achieved the three peat for the first time in its history, and from 2012 claiming five premierships within six years, matching the same achievement by the Yolla Football Club, between 1979 and 1984.

The club had the opportunity to make it five doubles in six years but the reserves amazing flag run unfortunately came to an end. It took a goal in the dying seconds of the grand final to break the streak, ending one of Australian football's most incredible records. However, season 2017 proved to be yet another record breaking year in the most dominant period in club history.

Season 2018 began poorly with the departure of the head coach on the eve of the opening round. In addition, a win/loss record of 1-3 after the opening 4 rounds and a loss of over 200 points at the hands of minor premiers Queenstown, suggested the club was on a steep fall from grace. Scraping into 3rd position at the conclusion of the regular season however, at least earned the club the double chance in the finals. Experience and grit came to the fore as the hawks played a ruthless final series highlighted by relentless pressure and composure on the ball. Defeating Cuprona by 30 points in the qualifying final, the hawks met the undefeated and fancied crows in the semi, which they dominated to a 78-point win, leaving the crows almost as shell-shocked as the spectators. The club again played a great grand final, claiming the 2018 premiership by 57 points and becoming the first club in DFA history to win 4 consecutive flags. Although the reserves grand final dominance came to an end, the club's 14th DFA premiership, and 6th in 7 years, well and truly sealed their status as the most dominant club in the competition.

The 2019 season was another challenging year for the club with heavy defeats to Somerset and Queenstown, though again finished the regular season in third place. However, after accounting for Cuprona (20. 13. 133 to 4. 6. 30) and Queenstown (17. 16. 118 to 11. 7. 73) in the Semi and Preliminary Finals respectively, the hawks earned a fifth straight grand final appearance against Somerset, whom they had defeated in the 2015 and 2017 grand finals previously. Although the hawks had fought hard to make the contest a close 8 points at half time, they could not match the pace and fitness of the ladder leading roos, eventually succumbing to a 64-point defeat. While the flag winning run came to an end however, the club's underdog reserves fought their way back from behind to claim a 26-point grand final victory, the first reserves flag for three years.

The COVID-19 global pandemic saw season 2020 cancelled for the DFA. The 2021 season went ahead in spite of the pandemic, though a number of contributing factors resulted in the club missing out on finals football for the first time in over two decades, ending a greatly successful period of consistent finals football and 7 senior premierships. The 2022 season saw the return of 2016 premiership coach Rohan Baldock as senior coach, and the return to finals football for the club, finishing in second place on the ladder after a seventh-place finish in 2021.

Building on the momentum of the previous season, 2023 saw the club return to the DFA grand final in both grades. While the reserves were not able to win on the day, the senior team faced the club against which it won its last senior premiership in 2018 opponent Queenstown. The lead for the Hawks was only nine points at the main break but five unanswered goals in the third term created a 43-point buffer going into the last quarter and a bit of breathing space for the (Darwin) Headquarters' tenants to enjoy the last stanza and win the 2023 premiership by 57 points, coincidentally the same margin as the 2018 decider. Rohan Baldock proved the difference in the match, kicking ten goals to win the Snooks Medal as best afield, helping to return the hawks back to the top of the competition after a few years in rebuild.

After being eliminated in the semi finals in 2024, the 2025 season saw the club return to its dominant form, finishing the regular season as minor premiers. The hawks however were well outplayed in the semi final, being convincingly beaten by Queenstown by 50 points, before bouncing back in preliminary final with a win against Ridgley by 35 points, to book another grand final against the Queenstown Crows, their 2023, and 2018 opponents in the decider. South Burnie played a strong first half, going into the main break with a lead of 17 points. Despite Crow Alex Dilger bagging the first goal of the third, the Hawks went on to kick three of the next five goals to lead by 19 points at the final change. It was a lead that only continued to grow in the final term, as the Hawks began their celebrations as the 2025 premiers. Rohan Baldock was again a difference maker in the match, as he was in the 2023 decider, being awarded the Snooks Medal as best afield. The club qualified to compete in the Country Cup a fortnight later against NWFA premiers East Ulverstone, where they proved too strong winning 16.11 (107) to 9.8 (62) to cap off a successful 2025 season.

== Club song ==
The club has had two team songs during its life, the APPM song, and the South Burnie song:

APPM Football Club song

“We are the Pulp boys”

We are a jolly lot of chaps,

And each one is a star.

And if it's not at football

You'll find us at the bar.

And if you care to join us

You know that it's alright,

For you can be a member

Of the Pulp Work's team tonight.

(Chorus)

We are the Pulp team,

We are the team.

We can't be beaten

That's easily seen.

At the end of the season,

You'll know the reason,

Why we are the premier team.

South Burnie Football Club song

We’re a happy team South Burnie,

We’re the mighty fighting hawks.

We love our club

And we play to win

Riding the bumps with a grin, South Burnie.

Come what may you'll find us striving

Teamwork is the thing that counts (4,3,2),

One for all and all for one's

The way we play South Burnie

We are the mighty fighting hawks.

== Honours ==
Greatest winning margin – 2017 - 377 points v Yolla at Wivenhoe – 62. 19. (391) to 2. 2. (14)

Highest score – 2017 - 62. 19. (391) v Yolla 2. 2. (14)

Lowest score - 1. 3. (9) – 1954

Premierships (18)

NWFU – 1945, 1949

DFA – 1954, 1959, 1962, 1967, 1968, 1994, 1995, 2004, 2012, 2013, 2015, 2016, 2017, 2018, 2023, 2025

Inter Association Premiers – 1968

DFA Reserves Premierships – 1987, 1988, 2002, 2003, 2006, 2007, 2008, 2009, 2010, 2011, 2012, 2013, 2014, 2015, 2016, 2019

Under 17 Premierships – 2001, 2005

=== Grand Finals ===
NWFU 1945 – APPM 13.16 (94) df. East Devonport 8.15 (63) 31 points

1949 - APPM 14.12 (96) df. Ulverstone 9.15 (69) 27 points

DFA

1954 – APPM 6. 9. (45) df. Montello 6. 8. (44) 1 point

1959 – South Burnie 13. 5. (83) df. Yeoman 10. 9. (69) 14 points

1962 – South Burnie 11. 12. (78) df. Cam 8. 13. (61) 17 points

1967 – South Burnie 15. 11. (101) df. Ridgley 11. 4. (70) 31 points

1968 – South Burnie 14. 9. (93) df. Ridgley 8. 6. (54) 39 points

1984 – Yolla 17. 12. (114) df. South Burnie 13. 14. (92) 22 points

1994 – South Burnie 15. 18. (108) df. Somerset 8. 9. (57) 51 points

1995 – South Burnie 22. 16. (148) df. West Ulverstone 7. 19. (61) 87 points

1996 – Natone – 15. 12. (102) df. South Burnie 11. 7. (73) 29 points

2001 – Natone df. 18. 19. (127) df. South Burnie 6. 6. (42) 85 points

2003 – Myalla 4. 5. (29) df. South Burnie 3. 2. (20) 9 points

2004 – South Burnie 12. 6. (78) df. Cuprona 7. 11. (53) 25 points

2006 – Yolla 10. 11. (71) df. South Burnie 7. 9. (51) 20 points

2012 – South Burnie 15. 17. (107) df. Ridgley 10. 15. (75) 32 points

2013 – South Burnie 18. 11. (119) df. Ridgley 10. 9. (69) 50 points

2015 – South Burnie 19. 14. (128) df. Somerset 19. 11. (125) 3 points

2016 – South Burnie 20. 22. (142) df. Natone 12. 6. (78) 64 points

2017 - South Burnie 23. 24. (162) df. Somerset 3. 6. (24) 138 points

2018 - South Burnie 12. 13. (85) df. Queenstown 3. 10 (28) 57 points

2019 - Somerset 17. 17. (119) df. South Burnie 7. 13. (55) 64 points

2023 - South Burnie 14. 11. (95) df. Queenstown 5. 8. (38) 57 points

2025 - South Burnie 16. 11. (107) df. Queenstown 7. 9. (51) 56 points

Reserves Grand Finals

1971 – Myalla 9. 5. (59) df. South Burnie 7. 5. (47) 12 points

1983 – Yolla 9. 9. (63) df. South Burnie 6. 13. (49) 14 points

1985 – West Ulverstone 16. 9. (105) df. South Burnie 12. 12. (84) 21 points

1987 – South Burnie 11. 17. (83) df. Yolla 7. 8. (50) 33 points

1988 – South Burnie 11. 9. (75) df. Yolla 10. 10. (70) 5 points

1996 – Yeoman 6. 8. (44) df. South Burnie 4. 9. (33) 11 points

2000 – Natone 7. 10. (52) df. South Burnie 4. 8. (32) 20 points

2001 – Yolla 4. 6. (30) df. South Burnie 4. 3. (27) 3 points

2002 – South Burnie 9. 7. (61) df. Natone 1. 6. (12) 49 points

2003 – South Burnie 4. 12. (36) df. Natone 4. 8. (32) 4 points

2006 – South Burnie 13. 12. (90) df. Somerset 11. 10. (76) 14 points

2007 – South Burnie 17. 11. (113) df. Somerset 8. 12. (60) 53 points

2008 – South Burnie 19. 12. (126) df. Somerset 12. 8. (80) 46 points

2009 – South Burnie 18. 5. (113) df. Somerset 8. 5. (53) 60 points

2010 – South Burnie 13. 14. (92) df. Somerset 9. 9. (63) 29 points

2011 – South Burnie 25. 20. 170 df. Natone 9. 3. (57) 113 points

2012 – South Burnie 15. 13. (103) df. Ridgley 10. 7. (67) 36 points

2013 – South Burnie 14. 10. (94) df. Ridgley 7. 11. (53) 41 points

2014 – South Burnie 15. 15. (105) df. Queenstown 10. 10. (70) 35 points

2015 – South Burnie 16. 9. (115) df. Somerset 4. 10. (34) 81 points

2016 – South Burnie 8. 15. (63) df. Somerset 5. 10. (40) 23 points

2017 - Somerset 8. 4. (52) df. South Burnie 6. 10. (46) 6 points

2019 - South Burnie 12. 9. (81) df. Somerset 8. 7. (55) 26 points

2023 - Yolla 9. 15. (69) df. South Burnie 2. 7. (19) 50 points

1968 inter association grand final

South Burnie 24. 16. (160) df. Gowrie Park (NWFA) 3. 8. (26)

2025 Country Cup

South Burnie 16.11 (107) df. East Ulverstone 9.8 (62)

Snooks Medal (Best afield Grand Final)

- 1994 J. Overton
- 1995 M. Hayes
- 2004 A. Smith
- 2012 K. Lamprey
- 2013 K. Lamprey
- 2016 C. Wedd
- 2017 Z. Murphy
- 2018 K. Bracken
- 2023 R. Baldock
- 2025 R. Baldock

Ewington medal (DFA Senior Best and Fairest)

- 1952 B. Kerr
- 1961 W. Parker
- 1970 K. Redman
- 1979 G. Jackson
- 1980 J. Seelig
- 1982 D. Green
- 1991 P. Guard
- 1992 P. Guard
- 2004 R. Townsend
- 2006 J. Collins
- 2011 J. Brakey
- 2012 J. Brakey
- 2014 J. Brakey
- 2017 J. Brakey

== President ==
- 1941
- 1942
- 1943
- 1944 P. Bryce
- 1945 P. Bryce
- 1946 P. Bryce
- 1947 G. Moline
- 1948
- 1949 A. Muir
- 1950 A. Muir
- 1951 A. Muir
- 1952 A. Muir
- 1953 A. Muir
- 1954 A. Muir
- 1955 M. Jenkins
- 1956 W. Brakey
- 1957 W. Brakey
- 1958 W. Brakey
- 1959 W. Brakey
- 1960 W. Brakey
- 1961 W. Brakey
- 1962 W. Brakey
- 1963 W. Brakey
- 1964 W. Brakey
- 1965 W. Brakey
- 1966 W. Brakey
- 1967 W. Brakey
- 1968 W. Brakey
- 1969 G. Hammond
- 1970 G. Hammond
- 1971 R. Johns
- 1972 R. Johns
- 1973 T. Snooks
- 1974 B. Walker
- 1975 B. Walker
- 1976 B. Walker
- 1977 B. Walker
- 1978 B. Walker
- 1979 B. Walker
- 1980 G. Cocks
- 1981 G. Cocks
- 1982 N. McCarthy
- 1983 N. McCarthy
- 1984 N. McCarthy
- 1985 K. Moles
- 1986 K. Moles
- 1987 R. Milne
- 1988 G. Monson
- 1989 E. Gillow
- 1990 W. Parker
- 1991 W. Parker
- 1992 W. Parker
- 1993 S. Kelly
- 1994 T. Snooks
- 1995 T. Snooks
- 1996 C. Swain
- 1997 C. Swain
- 1998 T. Snooks
- 1999 T. Snooks
- 2000 M. Kelly
- 2001 M. Kelly
- 2002 M. Kelly
- 2003 J. Radford
- 2004 J. Radford
- 2005 J. Radford
- 2006 J. Radford
- 2007 J. Radford
- 2008 J. Radford
- 2009 S. Dolting
- 2010 S. Dolting
- 2011 J. Gillam
- 2012 J. Gillam
- 2013 J. Gillam / J. Hayes
- 2014 J. Hayes
- 2015 R. Townsend
- 2016 R. Townsend
- 2017 R. Townsend
- 2018 R. Townsend
- 2019 M. French
- 2020 M. French
- 2021 M. French
- 2022 M. French / J. Green
- 2023 J. Green / S. Redman
- 2024 N. Hayes / S.Redman
- 2025 N. Hayes
- 2026 N. Hayes

== Secretary ==
- 1941
- 1942
- 1943
- 1944 E. Foster
- 1945 E. Foster
- 1946 A. Forrest
- 1947
- 1948
- 1949 J. Austin
- 1950
- 1951 J. Clarke
- 1952 N. Southby
- 1953 N. Southby
- 1954 N. Southby
- 1955 N. Southby
- 1956 N. Southby
- 1957 L. Rayner
- 1958 L. Rayner
- 1959 L. Rayner
- 1960 L. Rayner
- 1961 L. Rayner
- 1962 L. Rayner
- 1963 L. Rayner
- 1964 T. Snooks
- 1965 T. Snooks
- 1966 T. Snooks
- 1967 T. Snooks
- 1968 R. French
- 1969 R. French
- 1970 T. Snooks
- 1971 R. French
- 1972 R. French
- 1973 G. Snooks
- 1974 K. Keegan
- 1975 P. White
- 1976 W. Jacobson
- 1977 G. Snooks/W. Jacobson
- 1978 G. Snooks
- 1979 K. Moles
- 1980 C. Ruffels
- 1981 P. Bennetts
- 1982 G. Snooks
- 1983 G. Snooks
- 1984 G. Snooks/G. Walker
- 1985 G. Monson
- 1986 S. E. Conway
- 1987 G. Walker/S. E. Ellis
- 1988 S. E. Ellis/K. Moles
- 1989 S. Ellis
- 1990 J. Parker
- 1991 A. Wiseman
- 1992 A. Wiseman
- 1993 K. Snooks
- 1994 K. Snooks
- 1995 K. Snooks
- 1996 D. Snooks
- 1997 P. Hardy
- 1998 G. Charles
- 1999 D. Snooks/D. Close
- 2000 K. Hayes/D. Snooks
- 2001 K. Hayes
- 2002 K. Hayes
- 2003 K. Hayes
- 2004 A. Kaine/N. Townsend
- 2005 A. Kaine/N. Townsend
- 2006 Y. Radford/N. Townsend
- 2007 N. Townsend/Ta. Busscher
- 2008 Ta. Busscher/Y. Radford
- 2009 N. Townsend/K. Hayes
- 2010 J. Gillan
- 2011 K. Hayes
- 2012 K. Hayes
- 2013 K. Lyons
- 2014 K. Lyons
- 2015 T. Vant
- 2016 N. Townsend
- 2017 N. Townsend
- 2018 L. Jones
- 2019 T. Vant
- 2020 T. Vant
- 2021 T. Vant
- 2022 T. Vant
- 2023 T. Vant/T. Walker
- 2024 T. Vant
- 2025 K. Hayes
- 2026 K. Clarke

== Treasurer ==
- 1951 D. McQuitty
- 1952 B. Cloudsdale
- 1953 B. Cloudsdale
- 1954 B. Cloudsdale
- 1955 B. Cloudsdale
- 1956 B. Cloudsdale
- 1957 B. Cloudsdale
- 1958 T. McMahon
- 1959 T. McMahon
- 1960 T. McMahon
- 1961 T. McMahon
- 1962 T. McMahon
- 1963 T. McMahon
- 1964 T. McMahon
- 1965 T. McMahon
- 1966 G. Proverbs
- 1967 E. Gillett
- 1968 E. Gillett
- 1969 B. Young
- 1970 B. Young
- 1971 B. Young
- 1972 B. Young
- 1973 B. Young
- 1974 E. Gillett
- 1975 T. Snooks
- 1976 T. Snooks
- 1977 I. Moore
- 1978 K. Keegan
- 1979 K. Keegan
- 1980 B. Walker
- 1981 C. Ruffels
- 1982 G. Monson
- 1983 G. Monson
- 1984 G. Monson
- 1985 G. Dyke/T. Marshall
- 1986 N. McCarthy/J. Mathews
- 1987 G. Monson/S. Milne
- 1988 D. Robinson
- 1989 K. Milne
- 1990 K. Milne
- 1991 B. walker/T. Snooks
- 1992 B. Walker/T. Snooks
- 1993 D. Snooks
- 1994 D. Snooks
- 1995 D. Snooks
- 1996 A. Clarke
- 1997 D. Snooks
- 1998 D. Snooks
- 1999 D. Snooks
- 2000 D. Snooks
- 2001 D. Snooks
- 2002 D. Snooks
- 2003 D. Snooks
- 2004 N. Murray/D. Snooks
- 2005 D. Snooks
- 2006 D. Ryan
- 2007 D. Ryan
- 2008 D. Snooks/Sch. Dolting
- 2009 D. Snooks/Sch. Dolting
- 2010 D. Snooks
- 2011 D. Snooks
- 2012 S. Swain
- 2013 S. Swain
- 2014 S. Swain/D. Snooks
- 2015 C. Hayes
- 2016 C. Hayes/L. Jones
- 2017 L. Jones
- 2018 N. Townsend
- 2019 Gar. Quirk
- 2020 M. Faulkner
- 2021 M. Faulkner
- 2022 M. Faulkner
- 2023 M. Faulkner
- 2024 T. Vant
- 2025 J. Bryan
- 2026 J. Bryan

== Coach ==
- 1941 Alf. Muir
- 1942
- 1943
- 1944 G. Huxley
- 1945 A. Muir
- 1946 I. Clay
- 1947 I. Clay
- 1948 G. Gneil
- 1949 G. Gneil
- 1950 G. Gneil
- 1951 N. Gale
- 1952 R. Kerr
- 1953 R. Kerr
- 1954 R. Kerr
- 1955 M. Redman
- 1956 R. Munday
- 1957 R. Kerr
- 1958 D. Briggs
- 1959 A. Jones
- 1960 A. Jones
- 1961 D. Anderson
- 1962 B. Flint
- 1963 B. Flint
- 1964 J. Webster
- 1965 J. Webster
- 1966 J. Webster
- 1967 M. Bramich
- 1968 B. Flint
- 1969 D. Hodgetts
- 1970 K. Redman
- 1971 K. Redman
- 1972 G. Lynch
- 1973 R. Webb
- 1974 W. Hayes
- 1975 W. Hayes
- 1976 N. McCarthy
- 1977 N. McCarthy
- 1978 W. Scott
- 1979 W. Scott
- 1980 J. Seelig
- 1981 J. Seelig
- 1982 N. Gardiner
- 1983 N. Gardiner
- 1984 G. Cross
- 1985 B. Newman/N. Gardiner
- 1986 I. Hammond
- 1987 P. French
- 1988 W. Gaffney
- 1989 W. Gaffney
- 1990 I. Hammond
- 1991 C. Loring
- 1992 C. Loring
- 1993 C. Loring
- 1994 R. Lavell
- 1995 R. Lavell
- 1996 R. Lavell
- 1997 R. Lavell
- 1998 R. Lavell
- 1999 A. Baldock
- 2000 A. Baldock
- 2001 A. Baldock
- 2002 R. Townsend
- 2003 R. Townsend
- 2004 A. Smith
- 2005 A. Smith
- 2006 A. Smith
- 2007 S. McCullogh
- 2008 S. McCullogh
- 2009 A. Hering/R. Townsend
- 2010 A. Hering/C. Stretton
- 2011 A. McClaren
- 2012 D. Crawford
- 2013 D. Crawford
- 2014 B. Holohan
- 2015 D. Crawford/R. Townsend
- 2016 R. Baldock
- 2017 Z. Murphy
- 2018 C. Wedd
- 2019 C. Wedd
- 2020 Gav. Quirk
- 2021 Gav. Quirk
- 2022 R. Baldock
- 2023 N. Holland
- 2024 J. Collins
- 2025 J. Collins
- 2026 B. Hayes
- 2027 B. Hayes

== Best and Fairest ==
- 1951 J. Hancock
- 1952 J. Hancock (2)
- 1953 K. Trebilco
- 1954 M. Redman
- 1955 L. Maney
- 1956 A. Templar
- 1957 E. Gardiner
- 1958 L. Munday
- 1959 D. Proverbs
- 1960 D. Hall
- 1961 W. Parker
- 1962 L. Redman
- 1963 D. Guy
- 1964 D. Hall (2)
- 1965 B. Hanigan
- 1966 H. Stubbs / K. Keegan
- 1967 J. Webster
- 1968 J. Meehan
- 1969 J. Munro
- 1970 D. Mason
- 1971 K. Edwards
- 1972 G. Snooks
- 1973 G. Davis
- 1974 T. Richards
- 1975 I. Moore
- 1976 C. Ruffels
- 1977 G. Jackson
- 1978 G. Sweeney
- 1979 G. Jackson (2)
- 1980 N. McCarthy
- 1981 D. Green
- 1982 D. Green (2)
- 1983 G. Catlin
- 1984 N. Gardiner
- 1985 N. Gardiner (2)
- 1986 N. Gardiner (3)
- 1987 W. Gaffney
- 1988 M. Saltmarsh
- 1989 D. Chilcott
- 1990 D. Zeuschner
- 1991 P. Guard
- 1992 C. Loring
- 1993 M. Hayes
- 1994 J. Overton
- 1995 D. Bowden
- 1996 T. Waller
- 1997 M. Hayes (2)
- 1998 T. Waller
- 1999 R. Townsend
- 2000 N. White
- 2001 R. Townsend (2)
- 2002 M. Hayes (3)
- 2003 M. Van Ommen
- 2004 R. Townsend (3)
- 2005 A. Smith / D. Crawford
- 2006 R. Townsend (4)
- 2007 A. P. Butler / R. Townsend (5)
- 2008 R. Townsend (6)
- 2009 J. Stubbs
- 2010 R. Baldock
- 2011 J. Brakey
- 2012 K. Lamprey
- 2013 A. Dudman
- 2014 J. Collins / J. Brakey (2)
- 2015 K. Lamprey (2)
- 2016 J. Brakey (3)
- 2017 C. Wedd
- 2018 K. Bracken
- 2019 Z. Walker
- 2020 Cancelled season (COVID-19)
- 2021 C. Wedd (2)
- 2022 C. Wedd (3)
- 2023 J. Chapman
- 2024 J. Blake
- 2025 Z. Smith
- 2026 R. Shakleton

== Life Members ==
- A. Muir
- M. Wiseman
- W. Brakey
- N. Southby
- R. Harkness
- D. Guy
- P. White
- M. Marshall
- K. Keegan
- D. Mason
- G. Hall
- G. Hammond
- T. Snooks
- G. Elliot
- G. Davis
- G. Snooks
- P. Sweeney
- I. Moore
- K. Edwards
- W. Casey
- R. Stevens
- B. Walker
- T. Edwards
- M. Jacobson
- N. McCarthy
- T. Marshall
- M. Creedon
- R. Mills
- G. Monson
- M. Gardiner
- D. Wiseman
- E. Jacobson
- R. Milne
- D. Robinson
- J. Potts
- M. Kelly
- B. Thompson
- R. Scott
- S. Kelly
- W. Parker
- R. Lavell
- D. Snooks
- N. Murray
- L. Clarke
- Mrs. E. Snooks
- R. Townsend
- M. Hayes
- Mrs. K. Hayes
- J. Radford
- G. French
- W. Kaine
- Mrs. A. Kaine
- Mrs. N. Townsend
- Mrs. Y Radford
- P. Swain
- M. French
- D. Gillam
- L. Wilkins
- J. Gillam
- N. Dolting
- D. Crawford
- D. Milne
- I. Mollison
- J. Hayes
- S. Dolting
- I. Gillam
- A. Jones
- L. Elphinstone
- A. Dolting
- Mrs. Sch Dolting
- K. Purdy
- J. Stubbs
- S. Gray
- A. P. Butler
- D. Clark
- R. Johnstone
- S. Elphinstone
- T. Bakes
- C. Mallinson
- J. Green
- R. Jones
- J. Rayner
- J. Collins
- B. Keene
- Z. Clarke
- N.Hayes

== 30 Year Team 1994-2023 ==
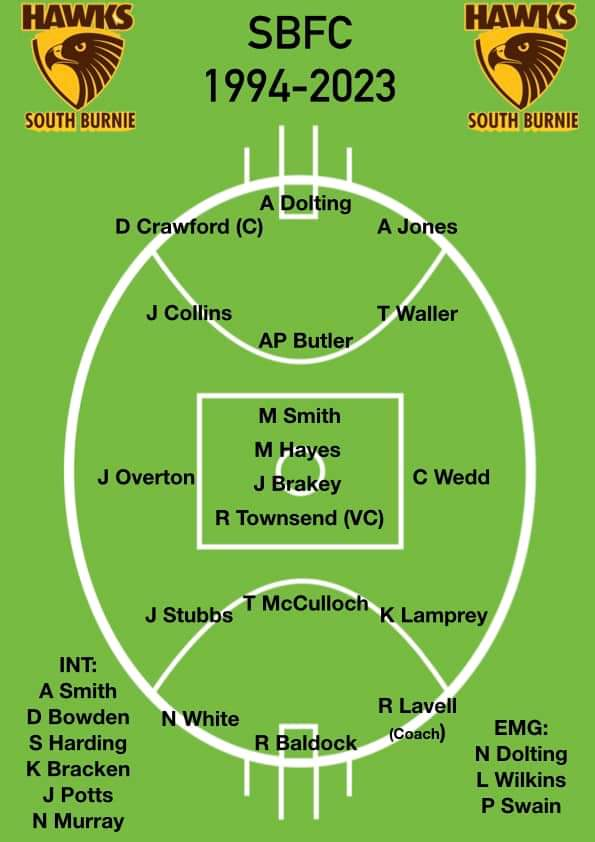

In 2023, the club honoured its success of the thirty-year period since the drought-breaking 1994 premiership by creating a team selected from the best players from the 1994-2023 period. The final team was selected from a shortlist of 50 players (minimum of 30 games played required to be selected).

Coach: R. Lavell

Captain: D. Crawford

Vice Captain: R. Townsend

== Junior Football Honour Roll ==
=== NTFL Under 18 ===
1997

Coach – A. Baldock

Captain – D. Gillam, N. Dolting, J. Denny

Best and Fairest – N. White

1998

Coach – T. Waller

Captain – C. Saltmarsh

Best and Fairest – B. Good

=== DFA Under 17 ===
Coach

2000 – W. Lowe

2001 – W. Lowe

2002 – W. Lowe

2003 – D. Crawford

2004 – J. Fry

2005 – J. Fry

2006 – J. Fry

2007 – J. Fry

2008 – G. Blyth

Captain

2000 – C. Sharman

2001 – I. Swain

2002 – M. Yaxley

2003 – C. Streets

2004 – B. Dobson

2005 – B. Dobson

2006 – J. French, N. Brakey

2007 – D. Hardy

2008 – B. French

Best and Fairest

2000 – L. Cooke

2001 – I. Swain

2002 – J. Collins

2003 – C. Streets, M. French

2004 – B. Dobson

2005 – D. Hardy

2006 – D. Hardy

2007 – D. Hardy

2008 – B. French
