= Yeoman Football Club =

Yeoman

Names
- Full name: Yeoman Football Club
- Nickname: Robins

2023 season
- After finals: 7th
- Home-and-away season: 7th
- Leading goalkicker: Cameron Upton (14)

Club details
- Founded: 1895; 131 years ago
- Colours: Black with Red sash
- Competition: Darwin Football Association
- Ground: Wivenhoe Showgrounds

Uniforms
Home	Away

Other information
- Official website: Yeoman AFC Official Club Website

The Yeoman Football Club is an Australian rules football club based in Burnie, Tasmania, which plays its home games at Wivenhoe Showgrounds, Burnie. It competes in the Darwin Football Association, running Senior and Reserve Grade sides.

== Formation ==
Yeoman was formed around 1895 and originally competed in junior competitions prior to World War I. It became a senior club when it was invited to compete in the North West Football Union in 1920. Originally based in Elliott, Tasmania, they moved their headquarters to Wynyard, Tasmania in 1922. In September 1924 they changed their name to Wynyard Football Club, to better represent their municipality, despite their already being another club by that name.

== Competitions ==
1906-15 – Burnie Junior Football League/Burnie Football League
1916-19 - In recess due to World War 1
1920-22 – Burnie Junior Football League/Burnie Football League
1922-23 – North West Football Union
1923-TBC - Table Cape Football Association
1940-41 – Darwin Football Association (First incarnation of DFA)
1942-43 - In recess due to World War 2
1944 - Darwin Football Association (First incarnation of DFA)
1945-48 – North West Football Union (Western Division)
1949-50 - North West Football Union
1951-Date – Darwin Football Association (Current incarnation of DFA)

NOTES
1. In March 1945, the Darwin Football Association changed its name to the NWFU Western Division
2. In 1949, the NWFU dropped its Eastern and Western Divisions, becoming the one competition

== Home ground ==
Yeoman currently plays its home games at Wivenhoe Showgrounds, Wivenhoe (2009 onwards). Prior to this, the club was based at Les Clark Oval, Cooee, from 1970 to 2008.

Before the move to Les Clark Oval, the Club had used two home grounds.

In Yeoman's first decades of existence home matches were played on a paddock at a local farm owned by James Gale, about 90 metres north of the Elliott Hall.

The club then moved its home games in the early 1920s to a new ground which had been opened for cricket and football, about 2 kilometres south of its initial home ground.

== Premierships ==
BURNIE FOOTBALL LEAGUE/BURNIE JUNIOR FOOTBALL LEAGUE
1906
1907
1910
1913
1914
1921
1922

PREVIOUS DARWIN FOOTBALL ASSOCIATION
1940: Yeoman 13.11 (89) d Wynyard 7.15 (57)

CURRENT DARWIN FOOTBALL ASSOCIATION
SENIOR GRADE
1951: Yeoman 8.17 (65) d Tewkesbury 2.3 (15)
1952: Yeoman 8.7 (55) d Somerset 6.8 (44)
1978: Yeoman 14.10 (94) d Ridgley 10.12 (72)
1993: Yeoman 20.13 (1323) d Somerset 14.12 (96)
1998: Yeoman 11.11 (77) d Yolla 5.8 (38)
RESERVE GRADE
1978: Yeoman 12.5 (77) d Cuprona 7.10 (52)
1992: Yeoman 10.9 (69) d Yolla 9.9 (63)
1995: Yeoman 15.8 (98) d Yolla 4.8 (32)
1996: Yeoman 6.8 (44) d South Burnie 4.9 (33)
1997: Yeoman 7.6 (48) d Natone 6.11 (47)
UNDER 17 GRADE
1999 (Combined side with Ridgley): Ridgley/Yeoman 21.12 (138) d West Ulverstone 4.5 (29)
