= Oldina, Tasmania =

Oldina Tasmania
- Coordinates: 41°05′20″S 145°40′14″E
- Population: 126 (2016 census)
- Postcode(s): 7325
- Location: 15 km (9 mi) S of Wynyard
- LGA(s): Waratah-Wynyard
- Region: North West Tasmania
- State electorate(s): Braddon
- Federal division(s): Braddon
Localities around Oldina:
Moorleah	Wynyard	Wynyard
Calder	Oldina	Mount Hicks
Takone	Yolla	Yolla

Oldina is a locality and small rural community in the local government area of Waratah-Wynyard, in the North West region of Tasmania. It is located about 15 kilometres (9.3 mi) south of the town of Wynyard. The 2016 census determined a population of 126 for the state suburb of Oldina.

== History ==
The early postal name for the locality was Upper Moores Plains. Changed to Oldina (an Aboriginal word meaning "snow") about 1911.

== Road infrastructure ==
The C237 route (Oldina Road) runs south from the Bass Highway through the locality and provides access to many other localities. The C239 route (Deep Creek Road) forms part of the eastern boundary and the C235 route (Lorries Road) intersects with the C237 in the locality.
