= Mount Hicks, Tasmania =

Mount Hicks Tasmania
- Coordinates: 41°04′14″S 145°43′39″E
- Population: 351 (2016 census)
- Postcode(s): 7325
- Location: 13 km (8 mi) S of Wynyard
- LGA(s): Waratah-Wynyard
- Region: North West Tasmania
- State electorate(s): Braddon
- Federal division(s): Braddon
Localities around Mount Hicks:
Wynyard	Wynyard	Wynyard
Oldina	Mount Hicks	Somerset
Yolla	Yolla	Elliott

Mount Hicks is a locality and small rural community in the local government area of Waratah-Wynyard in the North West region of Tasmania. It is located about 13 kilometres (8.1 mi) south of the town of Wynyard. The 2016 census determined a population of 351 people for the state suburb of Mount Hicks.

The Sunday school participants of the 1950s were able to meet up in the 2010s to reflect on the past.

== Road infrastructure ==
The B26 route (Mount Hicks Road) runs south from the Bass Highway through the locality on its way to the Murchison Highway. The C239 (Deep Creek Road), C241 (Seabrook Road), and C243 (Nunns Road) routes all intersect with the B26 in the locality.
