= Park Grove =

- Suburb
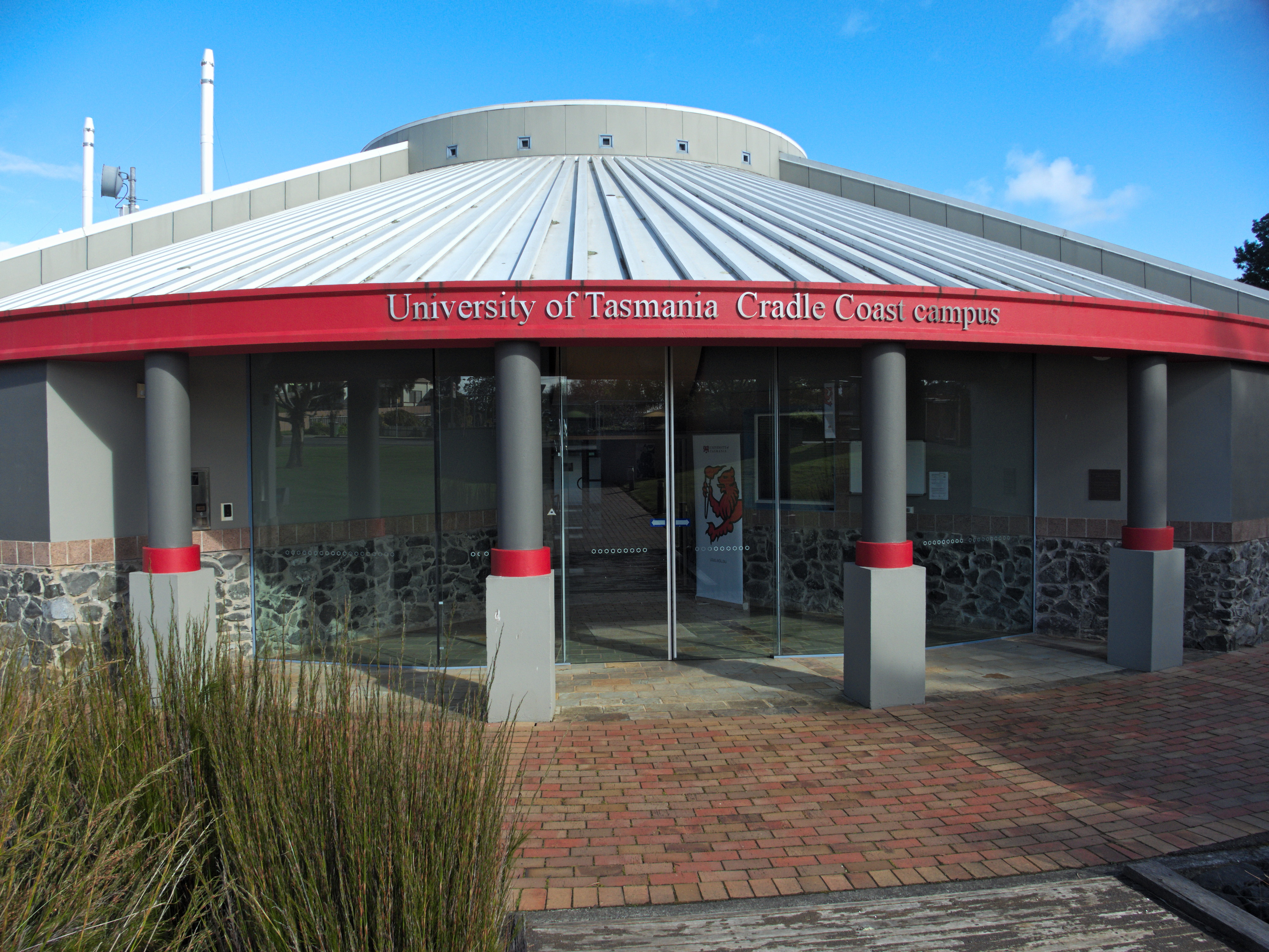
- Former University of Tasmania Cradle Coast Campus

- Interactive map of Park Grove
- Coordinates: 41.05513°S 145.88729°E
- Country: Australia
- State: Tasmania
- Region: North-west and west
- City: Burnie
- LGA: City of Burnie
- Location: 3 km (1.9 mi) W of Burnie

Government
  - State electorate: Braddon
  - Federal division: Braddon

Population
  - Total: 2,385 (2016)
- Postcode: 7320
Suburbs around Park Grove
Cooee	Parklands	Burnie
East Cam	Park Grove	Montello
East Cam	Shorewell Park	Hillcrest

Park Grove is a suburban locality in the local government area (LGA) of Burnie in the North-west and west LGA region of Tasmania. The locality is about 3 kilometres (1.9 mi) west of the town of Burnie. The 2016 census recorded a population of 2385 for the state suburb of Park Grove. Mainly a residential area, the suburb is located close to education facilities.

== History ==
Park Grove was gazetted as a locality in 1974.

== Geography ==
Cooee Creek forms most of the western boundary.

== Road infrastructure ==
The C108 route (West Mooreville Road / Mooreville Road / West Park Grove) passes through from south-west to north-east.

== Education ==
- Burnie Primary School
- Stella Maris Catholic Primary School Est. 1908 present site 1977
- Maddington Child Services
- Footprints Educational Complex
- University of Tasmania – Cradle Coast Campus Est. 1995; mostly vacated.

== Churches ==
- Burnie Seventh-day Adventist Church
- Martin Luther Lutheran Church Burnie

== Sport ==
The Burnie Tennis Centre and Burnie Tennis Club have hosted the Burnie International since 2003. Burnie Tennis Club competes in the Burnie Tennis League.
