= Mooreville, Tasmania =

Mooreville
- Suburb
- Interactive map of Mooreville
- Coordinates: 41.099°S 145.865°E
- Country: Australia
- State: Tasmania
- Region: North-west and west
- City: Burnie
- LGA: City of Burnie
- Location: 7 km (4.3 mi) SW of Burnie

Government
  - State electorate: Braddon
  - Federal division: Braddon

Population
  - Total: 303 (2016)
- Postcode: 7321
Suburbs around Mooreville
Elliott	East Cam	Downlands
Elliott	Mooreville	Stowport
Highclere	Ridgley	Stowport

Mooreville is a rural residential locality in the local government area (LGA) of Burnie in the North-west and west LGA region of Tasmania. The locality is about 7 kilometres (4.3 mi) south-west of the town of Burnie. The 2016 census recorded a population of 303 for the state suburb of Mooreville. While there are some residential allotments, the area is mainly agricultural farming land.

Services are located in the neighbouring suburb of East Cam. The Mooreville Training Track (formerly Armytage) is an equine stud.

There was a former quarry in the area that was proposed to be infilled as land reclamation.

There are a few properties in the area and also in the neighbouring suburb of Ridgley that have exquisite gardens such as the Emu Valley Rhododendron Garden.

== History ==
An early settler in the district, James Munce, named his property "Mooreville" after his parents' estate in England. Mooreville was gazetted as a locality in 1966.

== Geography ==
The Emu River forms the south-eastern boundary, and Cooee Creek forms most of the western.

== Road infrastructure ==
The B18 route (Ridgley Highway) passes through from south-west to south-east. Route C110 (Mooreville Road) starts at an intersection with B18 on the southern boundary and runs north through the locality.
