= Doctors Rocks =

- Town
- Coordinates: 41°00′S 145°46′E
- Country: Australia
- State: Tasmania
- Region: North-west and west
- LGA: Waratah-Wynyard Council
- Location: 8 km (5.0 mi) E of Wynyard

Government
  - State electorate: Braddon
  - Federal division: Braddon

Population
  - Total: 85 (2016 census)
- Postcode: 7325
Localities around Doctors Rocks
Wynyard	Bass Strait	Bass Strait
Wynyard	Doctors Rocks	Somerset
Wynyard	Somerset	Somerset

Doctors Rocks is a rural locality in the local government area (LGA) of Waratah–Wynyard in the North-west and west LGA region of Tasmania. The locality is about 8 kilometres (5.0 mi) east of the town of Wynyard. The 2016 census recorded a population of 85 for the state suburb of Doctors Rocks.

It is both a geographical feature and a district on the northwest coast of Tasmania between Somerset and Wynyard. The geographical feature is a basalt outcrop on the beachfront, behind which an escarpment rises to the northwest coast plateau. The terrain forced early road builders to construct a narrow roadway behind the rocks that was the scene of many serious accidents before modern vehicular traffic forced major earth-moving and re-siting of the main road further away from the rocks. This place is also known for the McDonald's ad that was shot there in 2007 to promote their 'Help the locals' campaign.

== History ==
The area was formerly known as Bluff Point. A property owned by a medical practitioner became known as “Doctors Rocks”, and this is believed to be the source of the name. Doctors Rocks was gazetted as a locality in 1966.

== Geography ==
The waters of Bass Strait form the north-eastern boundary.

== Road infrastructure ==
The Bass Highway (Route A2) passes through from north-east to north-west.
