= Riana Football Association =

Australian rules football league

- Most recent season or competition: 1964
- Sport: Australian rules football
- Founded: 1911
- Folded: 1964
- No. of teams: 4 (1964), 11 (historical)
- Country: Australia
- Last champion: Natone (1964)

The Riana Football Association was the final name of an Australian rules football competition based around the town of Penguin in north-west Tasmania.

== History ==
The Riana Football Association began as the Pine Road Football Association in 1911, servicing Penguin and the small towns based south of it. In addition to this name, the Association was known as the West Pine Football Association and the Penguin Football Association in its early years. The original line-up of clubs featured Ellenton, Penguin, Riana and Stowport. Stowport were replaced by Pine Road in 1912, who were in turn replaced by South Riana in 1913. The PRFA entered recess in 1915 due to WWI.

The PRFA was revived in 1919, however the season was left unfinished and the premiership not awarded due to the effects of the influenza outbreak on the clubs' ability to field teams. Penguin departed for the stronger North West Football Union in 1922. They were replaced by Ashwater, who only lasted two seasons before folding. The Association adopted the Riana FA name for the first time in 1924, but would only last one season before entering recess in 1925.

1928 saw the Association revived under the Cuprona FA name, with Cuprona, Natone, Pines and South Riana competing. By 1931 Pines had dropped out and Riana had re-formed and joined the CFA, along with Penguin Juniors. Stockport joined from the Burnie Football Association in 1932. They won two premierships in their first two season in the CFA but returned to the BFA after losing the 1934 grand final. Cuprona entered recess in 1937 and Penguin Juniors were replaced by West Pine in 1938. The Association became known as the Penguin Football Association in 1937 bu by 1939 the Riana FA name had re-appeared. The 1939 grand final between Riana and Natone saw a bizarre game played in which neither team was able to score a goal due to the deplorable conditions in which the game has played. The game had already been delayed by a week due to poor conditions but it appears that the weather only worsened during this time. Light snow was reported to have fallen during the final break, causing the beginning of the final quarter to be delayed. The final score saw Riana win 0.8 (8) to 0.4 (4), marking the only senior grand final in Tasmanian and likely Australian history to have been won with no goals scored by the winning team. The RFA entered recess a year later due to the onset of WWII.

Competition resumed in 1945 under the Natone Football Association name. The Association returned to 6 clubs, with Riana, South Riana and Natone joined by a re-formed Cuprona, Stockport and a newly-formed club from Upper Natone. Stowport folded after losing the 1946 grand final and were replaced by a new club from Sulphur Creek in 1948. Curpona won three premierships in a row from 1948 to 1950, but entered recess again for a year in 1954. Sulphur Creek also folded before the 1954 season. The Riana FA name returned along with Cuprona in 1955. The competition continued until the end of the 1964 season, by which time Upper Natone had folded and Riana was struggling for numbers. They would be absorbed by South Riana and transfer to the Leven FA in 1965, while Cuprona and Natone moved to the Darwin FA.

== Clubs ==
=== Final ===
Club	Colours	Nickname	Home Ground	Former league	Est.	Years in RFA	Known RFA Senior Premierships		Fate
Club	Colours	Nickname	Home Ground	Former league	Est.	Years in RFA	Total	Years	Fate
Cuprona (Ellenton 1911-20)		Robins	Wivenhoe Recreation Ground, Wivenhoe	–	1911	1911-1922, 1924, 1928-1936, 1945-1953, c.1955-1964	8	1922, 1948, 1949, 1950, 1957, 1958, 1960, 1963	In recess in 1923, 1925-27, 1937-44 and 1954. Moved to Darwin FA in 1965
Natone (Upper Natone 1928)	(1949)(?-1964)	Magpies	Natone Recreation Ground, Natone	–	1921	1921-1923, 1928-1964	5	1929, 1931, 1938, 1955, 1964	Recess between 1924-27. Moved to Darwin FA in 1965
Riana (Riana Ramblers 1914)		Blues	Riana Football Ground, Riana	–	1911	1911-1924, 1929-1964	8	1911, 1934, 1935, 1936, 1937, 1939, 1952, 1959, 1961	Recess between 1924-28. Absorbed by South Riana in 1965
South Riana (Riana Rovers 1914)	(1955)(1958)	Swans	South Riana Football Ground, South Riana	–	1913	1913-1924, 1928-1964	6	1924, 1928, 1930, 1945, 1946, 1962	Recess between 1925-27. Moved to Leven FA in 1965

=== Former ===
Club	Colours	Nickname	Home Ground	Former league	Est.	Years in RFA	Known RFA Senior Premierships		Fate
Club	Colours	Nickname	Home Ground	Former league	Est.	Years in RFA	Total	Years	Fate
Ashwater			Ashwater Football Ground, Penguin	–	1922	1922-1923	0	-	Folded after 1923 season
Penguin		Two Blues	Dial Park, Penguin	–	1890	1911-1921	2	1913, 1921	Moved to NWFU in 1922
Penguin juniors		Two Blues	Dial Park, Penguin	–	1890	1924, 1929-1937	0	-	?
Stowport		Tigers	Stowport Football Ground, Stowport	BFA	1903	1911, 1932-1934, 1945-1946	2	1932, 1933	Entered recess in 1912. Returned to Burnie FA in 1935. Folded after 1946 season
Sulphur Creek			Sulphur Creek Recreation Ground, Sulphur Creek	–	1948	1948-1953	0	-	Folded after 1963 season
Upper Natone	(1945-?)(1950s)		Upper Natone Recreation Ground, Upper Natone	–	1945	1945-?	4	1947, 1953, 1954, 1956	Folded at unknown date between 1956 and 1964
West Pine (Pine Road 1912, Pines 1928-31)				–	1912	1912, 1928, 1930-1931, 1938-1939	0	-	Folded after 1939 season

== Premierships ==
Year	Premier	Score	Runners-up	Notes
Pine Road FA
1911	Riana		?	
1912	?		?	
1913	Penguin		?	
1914				
1915-18	Association in recess (WWI)			
1919				Premiership not awarded due to influenza outbreak
1920	?		?	
1921	Penguin		?	
1922	Cuprona		?	
1923	?		?	
Riana Football Association
1924	South Riana	6.9 (44) - 4.5 (29)	Riana	
1925-27	Association in recess			
Cuprona Football Association
1928	South Riana	3.4 (22) - 2.5 (17)	Upper Natone	
1929	Natone	3.8 (26) - 3.0 (18)	Riana	
1930	South Riana		Natone	
1931	Natone	8.12 (60) - 7.6 (48)	South Riana	
1932	Stowport	6.3 (39) - 1.6 (12)	Riana	
1933	Stowport	8.5 (53) - 1.12 (18)	Natone	
1934	Riana	5.5 (35) - 4.4 (26)	Stowport	
1935	Riana	4.6 (30) - 2.6 (18)	Penguin juniors	
1936	Riana	9.10 (64) - 4.11 (35)	Cuprona	
Penguin Football Association
1937	Riana	9.5 (59) - 4.5 (29)	South Riana	
1938	Natone	10.6 (66) - 8.5 (53)	Riana	
Riana Football Association
1939	Riana	0.8 (8) - 0.4 (4)	Natone	Played in "deplorable conditions" at Cuprona.
1940-44	RFA in recess (WWII)			
Natone Football Association
1945	South Riana	9.17 (71) - 5.2 (32)	Natone	
1946	South Riana	5.6 (36) - 4.7 (31)	Stowport	
1947	Upper Natone	7.2 (44) - 6.5 (41)	Cuprona	
1948	Cuprona	13.8 (86) - 9.7 (61)	South Riana	
1949	Cuprona	10.11 (71) - 3.12 (36)	Natone	
1950	Cuprona		South Riana	
1951	?			
1952	Riana	8.3 (51) - 5.9 (39)	Upper Natone	
1953	Upper Natone		?	
1954	Upper Natone	8.9 (57) - 5.3 (33)	South Riana	
Riana Football Association
1955	Natone	9.10 (64) - 5.8 (38)	South Riana	
1956	Upper Natone	9.11 (65) - 4.3 (27)	Riana	
1957	Cuprona	14.23 (107) - 11.11 (77)	South Riana	
1958	Cuprona	5.9 (39) - 5.4 (34)	South Riana	
1959	Riana	9.13 (67) - 4.4 (28)	Cuprona	
1960	Cuprona	15.8 (98) - 7.15 (57)	South Riana	
1961	Riana	7.8 (50) - 7.7 (49)	Cuprona	
1962	South Riana	12.16 (88) - 9.11 (65)	Cuprona	
1963	Cuprona	7.9 (51) - 3.3 (21)	Riana	
1964	Natone	10.10 (70) - 5.4 (34)	Cuprona	
