= Luina, Tasmania =

Luina Tasmania
- Coordinates: 41°28′09″S 145°22′59″E
- Population: nil (2016 census)
- Postcode(s): 7321
- Location: 93 km (58 mi) SW of Wynyard
- LGA(s): Waratah–Wynyard
- Region: North-west and west
- State electorate(s): Braddon
- Federal division(s): Braddon
Localities around Luina:
West Coast	West Coast	West Coast
Savage River	Luina	Waratah
West Coast	West Coast	West Coast

Luina is a rural locality in the local government area (LGA) of Waratah–Wynyard in the North-west and west LGA region of Tasmania. The locality is about 93 kilometres (58 mi) south-west of the town of Wynyard. The 2016 census recorded a population of nil for the state suburb of Luina.

== History ==
Luina was gazetted as a locality in 1966. Previously known as Whyte River, the current name was in use by 1914. It is believed to be an Aboriginal word for “blue headed wren”.

The area was the site of a tin mining town in the early 1900s.

== Geography ==
Most of the boundaries are ridge lines.

== Road infrastructure ==
Route B23 (Waratah Road) runs through from east to west.
