= East Ridgley =

- Town
- Coordinates: 41°09′18″S 145°50′49″E
- Country: Australia
- State: Tasmania
- Region: North-west and west
- LGA: Burnie
- Location: 18 km (11 mi) S of Burnie

Government
  - State electorate: Braddon
  - Federal division: Braddon

Population
  - Total: 103 (2016 census)
- Postcode: 7322
Localities around East Ridgley
Ridgley	Ridgley	Stowport
Ridgley	East Ridgley	Upper Stowport
Highclere	Highclere	Upper Stowport

East Ridgley is a rural locality in the local government area (LGA) of Burnie in the North-west and west LGA region of Tasmania, Australia. The locality is about 18 kilometres (11 mi) south of the town of Burnie. The 2016 census recorded a population of 103 for the state suburb of East Ridgley.

== History ==
East Ridgley is a confirmed locality.

It is believed that the name "Ridgley" was conferred by surveyor Henry Hellyer in the 1820s.

== Geography ==
The Emu River forms the eastern boundary. The Pet River, a tributary of the Emu, forms most of the western boundary.

== Road infrastructure ==
Route B18 (Ridgley Highway) passes to the north-west. From there, Circular Road provides access to the locality.
