= Elliott, Tasmania =

Elliott
- Town
- Coordinates: 41°06′44″S 145°46′47″E
- Country: Australia
- State: Tasmania
- Region: North West
- LGA: Waratah-Wynyard
- Location: 21 km (13 mi) SE of Wynyard

Government
  - State electorate: Braddon
  - Federal division: Braddon

Population
  - Total: 352 (2016 census)
- Postcode: 7325
Localities around Elliott
Mount Hicks	Somerset	Somerset
Mount Hicks	Elliott	West Mooreville
Yolla	West Ridgley	Ridgley

Elliott is a rural locality in the local government area of Waratah-Wynyard in the North West region of Tasmania. It is located about 21 kilometres (13 mi) south-east of the town of Wynyard. The 2016 census determined a population of 352 for the state suburb of Elliott.

== History ==
The locality name was applied to a parish by 1886, and to a post station by 1899. It was gazetted in 1966.

== Geography ==
The Cam River forms most of the eastern boundary.

== Road infrastructure ==
The A10 route (Murchison Highway) enters from the north and runs through to the south-west before exiting. Route C243 (Nunns Road) starts at an intersection with Route A10 and runs west and south before exiting.
