= Downlands, Tasmania =

Downlands
- Suburb
- Interactive map of Downlands
- Coordinates: 41.08411°S 145.89345°E
- Country: Australia
- State: Tasmania
- Region: North-west and west
- City: Burnie
- LGA: City of Burnie
- Location: 4 km (2.5 mi) S of Burnie

Government
  - State electorate: Braddon
  - Federal division: Braddon

Population
  - Total: 240 (2016 census)
- Postcode: 7320
Suburbs around Downlands
Shorewell Park	Acton	Romaine
Mooreville	Downlands	Romaine
Mooreville	Romaine	Romaine

Downlands is a residential locality in the local government area (LGA) of Burnie in the North-west and west LGA region of Tasmania. The locality is about 4 kilometres (2.5 mi) south of the town of Burnie. The 2016 census recorded a population of 240 for the state suburb of Downlands. It is a small suburb of the Burnie in north-west Tasmania.

McKenna Park Regional Hockey Complex Inc caters for hockey on astro turf and cricket on grass grounds. McKenna Park also has a function centre.

The City Marians Hockey Club and South Burnie Hockey Club play out of the McKenna Park Regional Hockey Complex in the Burnie District Hockey Association.

== History ==
Downlands is a confirmed locality.

== Geography ==
All boundaries are survey lines.

== Road infrastructure ==
Route B18 (Mount Street) runs along the eastern boundary.
