= Darwin Football Association =

Australian rules football league in Tasmania

- Founded: 1951
- First season: 1951
- No. of teams: 7
- Most recent champion: Queenstown (2026)

The Darwin Football Association is an Australian rules football league in Tasmania. The clubs belonging to the association are from localities close to Burnie and on the West Coast of Tasmania. This includes Queenstown, making this competition the only competition in Australia to play some of its games on a gravel surface.

== History ==
The current form of the Darwin Football Association (DFA) was created in 1951. A previous version existed from 1938 to 1944 but appears unrelated despite two of the DFA's foundation clubs being in the competition. The first season featured just four clubs: Yeoman, Tewkesbury, APPM and Montello. Yeoman and APPM were previously members of the North West Football Union and Tewkesbury a member of the Ridgley Football Association. But in 1952 the numbers increased by three with the inclusion of Somerset, Mooreville and Ridgley. The arrival of Myalla and Yolla in 1953 increased the number again to eight clubs combined with the departure of Tewkesbury.

In 1955 the number of clubs dropped back to six with Montello and Somerset departing, and then following season APPM changed their name to South Burnie. In 1959 Mooreville had merged with Somerset to form the Cam FC as the competition remained more or less stable.

In 1965 the folding of the Riana Football Association brought Natone and Cuprona to the competition. This brought the competition up to eight clubs, and has never dropped below that number since. Another period of stability followed with only Cam reverting to Somerset FC in 1973 to create any ripples.

In 1982 the competition expanded to ten clubs with the inclusion of Sprent and West Ulverstone from the Leven Football Association. The DFA introduced a final five in 1986. In 1994, Queenstown "Crows"—a merger of the Queenstown-based clubs from the Western Tasmanian Football Association—joined the competition.

Numbers started to fall in 1996 when Sprent departed for the North Western Football Association, and then the following season South Burnie decided to try their luck in the Northern Tasmanian Football League, but they returned in 1999. In 2002 West Ulverstone followed Sprent to the North West Football Association, and in 2006 after many years in existence Myalla folded bringing the number of clubs back to eight for the first time since 1981.

Due to a shortage of players Natone went into recess for the 2019 season. Due to the COVID-19 Pandemic during 2020, the complete 2020 DFA Season was cancelled. Natone have re-joined the league for the 2021 season.

Natone re-entered recess prior to the 2024 season.

== Clubs ==
=== Locations ===
Club locations - Burnie & surrounds	Club locations - Queenstown

=== Current ===
Club	Colours	Nickname	Home Ground	Former League	Est.	Years in DFA	DFA Premierships	
Club	Colours	Nickname	Home Ground	Former League	Est.	Years in DFA	Total	Premierships
Cuprona		Bulldogs	Heybridge Recreation Ground, Heybridge	RFA	1911	1965-	2	1977, 2000
Queenstown		Crows	Queenstown Oval, Queenstown	–	1994	1994-	5	1997, 2014, 2021, 2024, 2026
Ridgley		Saints	Ridgley Recreation Ground, Ridgley	RFA	1891	1952-	12	1955, 1956, 1964, 1965, 1966, 1969, 1970, 1971, 1989, 2007, 2008, 2009
Somerset (Cam 1959-72)		Kangaroos	Langley Park, Somerset	–	1959	1959-	7	1960, 1961, 1963, 1972, 1982, 2010, 2019
South Burnie (APPM 1951-55)		Hawks	Wivenhoe Recreation Ground, Wivenhoe	NWFU, NWFL	1941	1951-1996, 1999-	16	1954, 1959, 1962, 1967, 1968, 1994, 1995, 2004, 2012, 2013, 2015, 2016, 2017, 2018, 2023, 2025
Yeoman		Robins	Wivenhoe Recreation Ground, Wivenhoe	NWFU	1890s	1951-	5	1951, 1952, 1978, 1993, 1998
Yolla (Tewkesbury 1951-52)		Demons	Yolla Recreation Ground, Yolla	RFA	1935	1951-	13	1979, 1980, 1981, 1983, 1984, 1986, 1987, 1988, 1991, 1992, 2005, 2006, 2022

=== Former clubs ===
Club	Colours	Nickname	Home Ground	Former League	Est.	Years in DFA	DFA Premierships		Fate
Club	Colours	Nickname	Home Ground	Former League	Est.	Years in DFA	Total	Premierships	Fate
Mooreville Road		Kangaroos	Somerset Recreation Ground, Somerset	RFA	1948	1952-1959	0	-	Merged with Somerset to form Cam in 1960
Montello		Magpies, Maulers	Montello Recreation Ground, Montello	–	1951	1951-1955	1	1953	Folded after 30 players were suspended for life due to violence in 1955
Myalla		Tigers	Myalla Recreation Ground, Sisters Creek	TCFA	1912	1953–2006	6	1957, 1958, 1974, 1975, 1976, 2003	Folded after 2006 season
Natone		Magpies	Natone Recreation Ground, Natone	RFA	1921	1965–2018, 2021-2023	7	1973, 1990, 1996, 1999, 2001, 2002, 2011	Entered recess in 2019, re-formed in 2021, entered recess again in 2024.
Somerset (original)		Ringtails		–	1952	1952-1954	0	-	Entered recess after 1954 season, merged with Mooreville Road to form Cam in 1960
Sprent	(1980s)(1990s)	Swans	Sprent Recreation Ground, Sprent	LFA	1908	1982-1996	0	-	Moved to North Western FA in 1997
West Ulverstone		Lions	West Ulverstone Football Ground, West Ulverstone	LFA	1973	1982-2001	1	1985	Moved to North Western FA in 2001

== Premiers ==
- 1951 Yeoman
- 1952 Yeoman
- 1953 Montello
- 1954 APPM
- 1955 Ridgley
- 1956 Ridgley
- 1957 Myalla
- 1958 Myalla
- 1959 South Burnie
- 1960 Cam
- 1961 Cam
- 1962 South Burnie
- 1963 Cam
- 1964 Ridgley
- 1965 Ridgley
- 1966 Ridgley
- 1967 South Burnie
- 1968 South Burnie
- 1969 Ridgley
- 1970 Ridgley
- 1971 Ridgley

- 1972 Cam
- 1973 Natone
- 1974 Myalla
- 1975 Myalla
- 1976 Myalla
- 1977 Cuprona
- 1978 Yeoman
- 1979 Yolla
- 1980 Yolla
- 1981 Yolla
- 1982 Somerset
- 1983 Yolla
- 1984 Yolla
- 1985 West Ulverstone
- 1986 Yolla
- 1987 Yolla
- 1988 Yolla
- 1989 Ridgley
- 1990 Natone
- 1991 Yolla
- 1992 Yolla

- 1993 Yeoman
- 1994 South Burnie
- 1995 South Burnie
- 1996 Natone
- 1997 Queenstown
- 1998 Yeoman
- 1999 Natone
- 2000 Cuprona
- 2001 Natone
- 2002 Natone
- 2003 Myalla
- 2004 South Burnie
- 2005 Yolla
- 2006 Yolla
- 2007 Ridgley
- 2008 Ridgley
- 2009 Ridgley
- 2010 Somerset
- 2011 Natone
- 2012 South Burnie
- 2013 South Burnie

- 2014 Queenstown
- 2015 South Burnie
- 2016 South Burnie
- 2017 South Burnie
- 2018 South Burnie
- 2019 Somerset
- 2020 Season cancelled (Covid-19)
- 2021 Queenstown
- 2022 Yolla
- 2023 South Burnie
- 2024 Queenstown
- 2025 South Burnie
- 2026 Queenstown

== 2009 Ladder ==
DarwinFA	Wins	Byes	Losses	Draws	For	Against	%	Pts	Final	Team	G	B	Pts	Team	G	B	Pts
Ridgley	13	0	1	0	1857	942	197.13	52	Elimination	Natone	13	20	98	Somerset	5	7	37
South Burnie	9	0	5	0	1593	1162	137.09	36	Qualifying	South Burnie	10	13	73	Yolla	9	15	69
Yolla	9	0	5	0	1358	1111	122.23	36	1st Semi	Natone	11	15	81	Yolla	5	12	42
Natone	8	0	6	0	1388	1130	122.83	32	2nd Semi	Ridgley	11	9	75	South Burnie	6	10	46
Somerset	8	0	6	0	1588	1315	120.76	32	Preliminary	Natone	13	15	93	South Burnie	12	10	82
Yeoman	4	0	10	0	1151	1460	78.84	16	Grand	Ridgley	8	9	57	Natone	6	12	48
Queenstown Crows	4	0	10	0	1024	1742	58.78	16									
Cuprona	1	0	13	0	1092	2189	49.89	4									

== 2010 Ladder ==
DarwinFA	Wins	Byes	Losses	Draws	For	Against	%	Pts	Final	Team	G	B	Pts	Team	G	B	Pts
South Burnie	16	0	2	0	2503	1216	205.84	64	Elimination	Somerset	22	15	147	Ridgley	17	12	114
Natone	15	0	3	0	2308	1282	180.03	60	Qualifying	Natone	16	11	107	Yolla	12	14	86
Yolla	11	0	7	0	2064	1201	171.86	44	1st Semi	Somerset	14	10	94	Yolla	6	9	45
Somerset	11	0	7	0	2181	1373	158.85	44	2nd Semi	Natone	9	9	63	South Burnie	4	8	32
Ridgley	9	0	9	0	1586	1658	95.66	36	Preliminary	Somerset	10	8	68	South Burnie	9	7	61
Queenstown Crows	5	0	13	0	1358	1977	68.69	20	Grand	Somerset	16	7	103	Natone	10	13	73
Yeoman	3	0	15	0	1112	2116	52.55	12									
Cuprona	2	0	16	0	1086	3375	32.18	8									

== 2011 Ladder ==
DarwinFA	Wins	Byes	Losses	Draws	For	Against	%	Pts	Final	Team	G	B	Pts	Team	G	B	Pts
Yolla	14	0	4	0	2252	1271	177.18	56	Elimination	Natone	14	10	94	South Burnie	11	20	86
Queenstown Crows	14	0	4	0	2188	1383	158.21	56	Qualifying	Queenstown Crows	14	10	94	Ridgley	13	11	89
Ridgley	12	0	5	1	2179	1355	160.81	50	1st Semi	Natone	17	14	116	Ridgley	11	12	78
Natone	10	0	7	1	1992	1626	122.51	42	2nd Semi	Queenstown Crows	12	16	88	Yolla	7	22	64
South Burnie	10	0	8	0	2230	1602	139.20	40	Preliminary	Natone	14	14	98	Yolla	14	11	95
Somerset	9	0	9	0	2174	1547	140.53	36	Grand	Natone	12	17	89	Queenstown Crows	11	10	76
Yeoman	1	0	17	0	927	2723	34.04	4									
Cuprona	1	0	17	0	919	3354	27.40	4									

== 2012 Ladder ==
DarwinFA	Wins	Byes	Losses	Draws	For	Against	%	Pts	Final	Team	G	B	Pts	Team	G	B	Pts
Ridgley	16	0	2	0	2687	1077	249.49	64	Elimination	Queenstown Crows	19	13	127	Somerset	6	13	49
South Burnie	14	0	4	0	2241	1228	182.49	56	Qualifying	South Burnie	9	10	64	Natone	5	14	44
Natone	13	0	5	0	2529	1231	205.44	52	1st Semi	Natone	25	7	157	Queenstown Crows	12	15	87
Queenstown Crows	9	0	9	0	2120	1451	146.11	36	2nd Semi	Ridgley	20	9	129	South Burnie	11	16	82
Somerset	8	0	10	0	2048	1760	116.36	32	Preliminary	South Burnie	10	14	74	Natone	6	11	47
Yolla	8	0	10	0	1841	1597	115.28	32	Grand	South Burnie	15	17	107	Ridgley	10	15	75
Yeoman	4	0	14	0	1341	2495	53.75	16									
Cuprona	0	0	18	0	422	4390	9.61	0									

== 2013 Ladder ==
DarwinFA	Wins	Byes	Losses	Draws	For	Against	%	Pts	Final	Team	G	B	Pts	Team	G	B	Pts
South Burnie	16	0	2	0	2781	1082	257.02	64	Elimination	Yeoman	11	12	78	Somerset	10	6	66
Ridgley	15	0	3	0	2534	1189	213.12	60	Qualifying	Ridgley	14	13	97	Queenstown Crows	7	15	57
Queenstown Crows	13	0	5	0	2139	1609	132.94	52	1st Semi	Queenstown Crows	13	17	95	Yeoman	7	14	56
Somerset	11	0	7	0	2168	1587	136.61	44	2nd Semi	Ridgley	16	13	109	South Burnie	16	9	105
Yeoman	9	0	9	0	1922	1789	107.43	36	Preliminary	South Burnie	21	19	145	Queenstown Crows	9	10	64
Yolla	5	0	13	0	1437	2084	68.95	20	Grand	South Burnie	18	11	119	Ridgley	10	9	69
Cuprona	2	0	16	0	983	3067	32.05	8									
Natone	1	0	17	0	1147	2704	42.42	4									

== 2014 Ladder ==
DarwinFA	Wins	Byes	Losses	Draws	For	Against	%	Pts	Final	Team	G	B	Pts	Team	G	B	Pts
South Burnie	16	0	2	0	3261	861	378.75	64	Elimination	Ridgley	19	18	132	Natone	4	6	30
Queenstown Crows	15	0	2	1	2864	943	303.71	62	Qualifying	Queenstown Crows	16	14	110	Somerset	14	10	94
Somerset	14	0	4	0	2656	1185	224.14	56	1st Semi	Somerset	23	19	157	Ridgley	11	12	78
Ridgley	10	0	7	1	2275	1599	142.28	42	2nd Semi	Queenstown Crows	14	21	105	South Burnie	16	7	103
Natone	7	0	11	0	1577	2297	68.65	28	Preliminary	Somerset	23	9	147	South Burnie	12	13	85
Yeoman	6	0	12	0	1247	2492	50.04	24	Grand	Queenstown Crows	12	13	85	Somerset	11	9	75
Yolla	2	0	16	0	851	3486	24.41	8									
Cuprona	1	0	17	0	995	2863	34.75	4									

== See also ==
- Queenstown Oval, Tasmania
