= Ocean Vista, Tasmania =

Ocean Vista
- Suburb
- Interactive map of Ocean Vista
- Coordinates: 41°02′39″S 145°51′30″E
- Country: Australia
- State: Tasmania
- Region: North-west and west
- City: Burnie
- LGA: Burnie
- Location: 6 km (3.7 mi) W of Burnie

Government
  - State electorate: Braddon
  - Federal division: Braddon

Population
  - Total: 306 (2016 census)
- Postcode: 7320
Suburbs around Ocean Vista
Bass Strait	Bass Strait	Bass Strait
Camdale, East Cam	Ocean Vista	Cooee
East Cam	East Cam	East Cam

Ocean Vista is a rural residential locality in the local government area (LGA) of Burnie in the North-west and west LGA region of Tasmania. The locality is about 6 kilometres (3.7 mi) west of the town of Burnie. The 2016 census recorded a population of 306 for the state suburb of Ocean Vista.

== History ==
Ocean Vista was gazetted as a locality in 1966.

== Geography ==
The waters of Bass Strait form the northern boundary. The Western Railway Line passes through from north-east to north-west.

== Road infrastructure ==
Route A2 (Bass Highway) runs through from north-east to north-west.
