= Cooee, Tasmania =

Cooee Tasmania
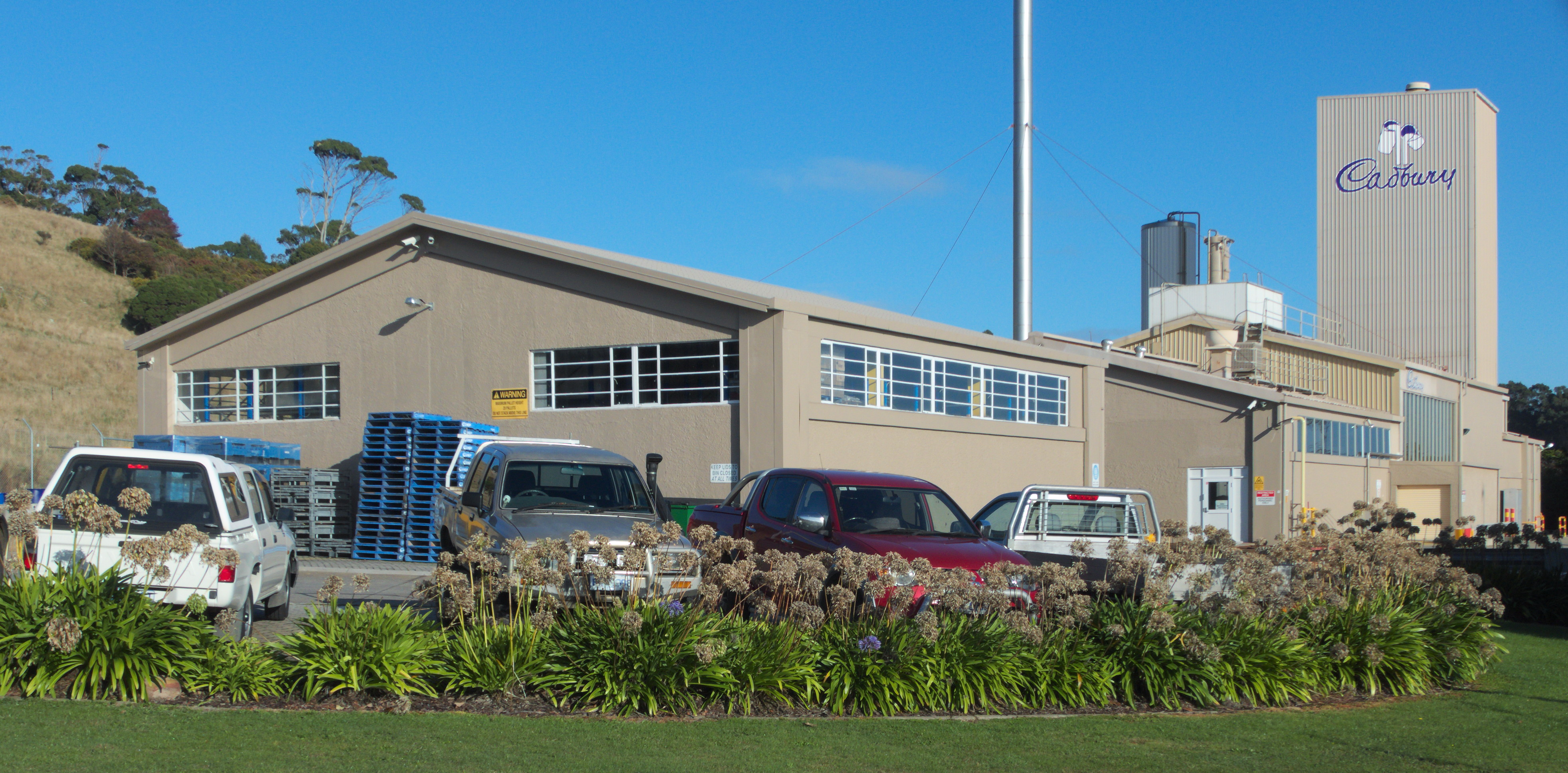
- Cadbury milk processing plant

- Coordinates: 41°02′28″S 145°52′35″E
- Population: 559 (2011 census)
- Postcode(s): 7320
- Time zone: AEST (UTC+10)
  - Summer (DST): AEDT (UTC+11)
- LGA(s): City of Burnie
- State electorate(s): Braddon
- Federal division(s): Braddon
Suburbs around Cooee:
Bass Strait	Bass Strait	Bass Strait
Ocean Vista	Cooee	Parklands
East Cam	East Cam	Park Grove

Cooee is a small town on the north-west coast of Tasmania immediately west of Burnie, to which it is in effect a dormitory suburb. At the 2011 census, Cooee had a population of 559.

The Burnie GP Super Clinic is located in Cooee as well as a pharmacy and North West Pathology.

== History ==
Cooee Creek Post Office opened on 1 April 1906 and was renamed Cooee in 1912.

During the 1970s it promoted its "Golden Mile" of new and used car lots and service stations. One of Burnie's two state schools is situated on its western edge.

== Community ==
=== Coastal pathway ===
The development of a coastal pathway will connect Cooee and Burnie to Wynyard and Latrobe as part of a State Government initiative to upgrade infrastructure on the northwest coast of Tasmania.

== Education ==
- Cooee Primary School
- Burnie High School, established 1916

== Sport ==
The Cooee Bulldogs and Burnie Tigers joined the North Western Football Association in the 1940s. They merged in the 1980s and become the Burnie Hawks. They merged again in 1995 to become the Burnie Dockers In 2007 the merged club Burnie-Cooee was inducted into the Tasmanian Football Hall of Fame.

== Notable people ==
- Harold Dowling Games Record Holder – Cooee F.C. was inducted into the Tasmanian Football Hall of Fame in 2008.
- Joshua Thomas Hoskins Whitsitt – Politician MHR 1909–22
- Hon. Ron Cornish – Politician (Liberal); Former member of the Tasmanian House of Assembly for Braddon
- Bryan Green – Politician (ALP); Member of the Tasmanian House of Assembly for the Braddon
- Alastair Lynch – AFL football player for Fitzroy, the Brisbane Bears and Brisbane Lions
- Frank Neasey – Puisne Judge of the Supreme Court of Tasmania
- Ian Rist – National and Commonwealth Clay Target Shooting Champion. Australian International Shooting Team member 1975.
