= West Ridgley =

- Town
- Coordinates: 41°09′23″S 145°46′29″E
- Country: Australia
- State: Tasmania
- Region: North West
- LGA: Burnie
- Location: 20 km (12 mi) SW of Burnie

Government
  - State electorate: Braddon
  - Federal division: Braddon

Population
  - Total: 125 (2016 census)
- Postcode: 7321
Localities around West Ridgley
Elliott	West Mooreville	West Mooreville
Elliott	West Ridgley	Ridgley, Highclere
Tewkesbury	Tewkesbury	Highclere

West Ridgley is a locality and small rural community in the local government area of Burnie in the North West region of Tasmania. It is located about 20 kilometres (12 mi) south-west of the town of Burnie. The 2016 census determined a population of 125 for the state suburb of West Ridgley.

== History ==
The locality was gazetted in 1966.

== Geography ==
The Guide River forms the eastern boundary, and the Cam River forms the western boundary.

== Road infrastructure ==
The C104 route (West Ridgley Road / Guide Road) enters from the east and runs south-west before exiting to the south. Route C105 (West Ridgley Road / Serpentine Road) starts and finishes at two intersections with route C104, performing a loop that runs west, south and east.
