= Upper Stowport =

- Town
- Coordinates: 41°09′22″S 145°53′47″E
- Country: Australia
- State: Tasmania
- Region: North West
- LGA: Burnie
- Location: 16 km (9.9 mi) S of Burnie

Government
  - State electorate: Braddon
  - Federal division: Braddon

Population
  - Total: 99 (SAL 2021)
- Postcode: 7321
Localities around Upper Stowport
East Ridgley	Stowport	Stowport
East Ridgley	Upper Stowport	Natone
Highclere	Upper Natone	Natone

Upper Stowport is a locality and small rural community in the local government area of Burnie in the North West region of Tasmania. It is located about 16 kilometres (9.9 mi) south of the town of Burnie.

== History ==
The locality was gazetted in 1966.

The 2016 census determined a population of 105 for the state suburb of Upper Stowport. At the 2021 census, the population had dropped to 99.

== Geography ==
Chasm Creek forms part of the eastern boundary, and the Emu River forms most of the western boundary.

== Road infrastructure ==
The C114 route (Upper Stowport Road / Lottah Road) enters from the north-east, runs south-west to the centre, and turns east before exiting.
