= Roger Chalk =

Australian politician

Roger George Chalk AM is the former mayor of the Tasmanian local government area of Waratah-Wynyard, and patron of the Wynyard Municipal Concert Band. He has been a Councillor on the Wynyard Council since 1976, and the Waratah-Wynyard Council since its establishment in 1993. He held the title of Mayor from 2000 to 2005, and has also served nine years as Warden, a similar position.

Chalk has been the president of the Municipal Association of Tasmania, and represented Tasmania at the Australian Local Government Association. In 1996 he was awarded membership of the Order of Australia for service to local government.
