= Parklands, Tasmania =

Parklands
- Suburb
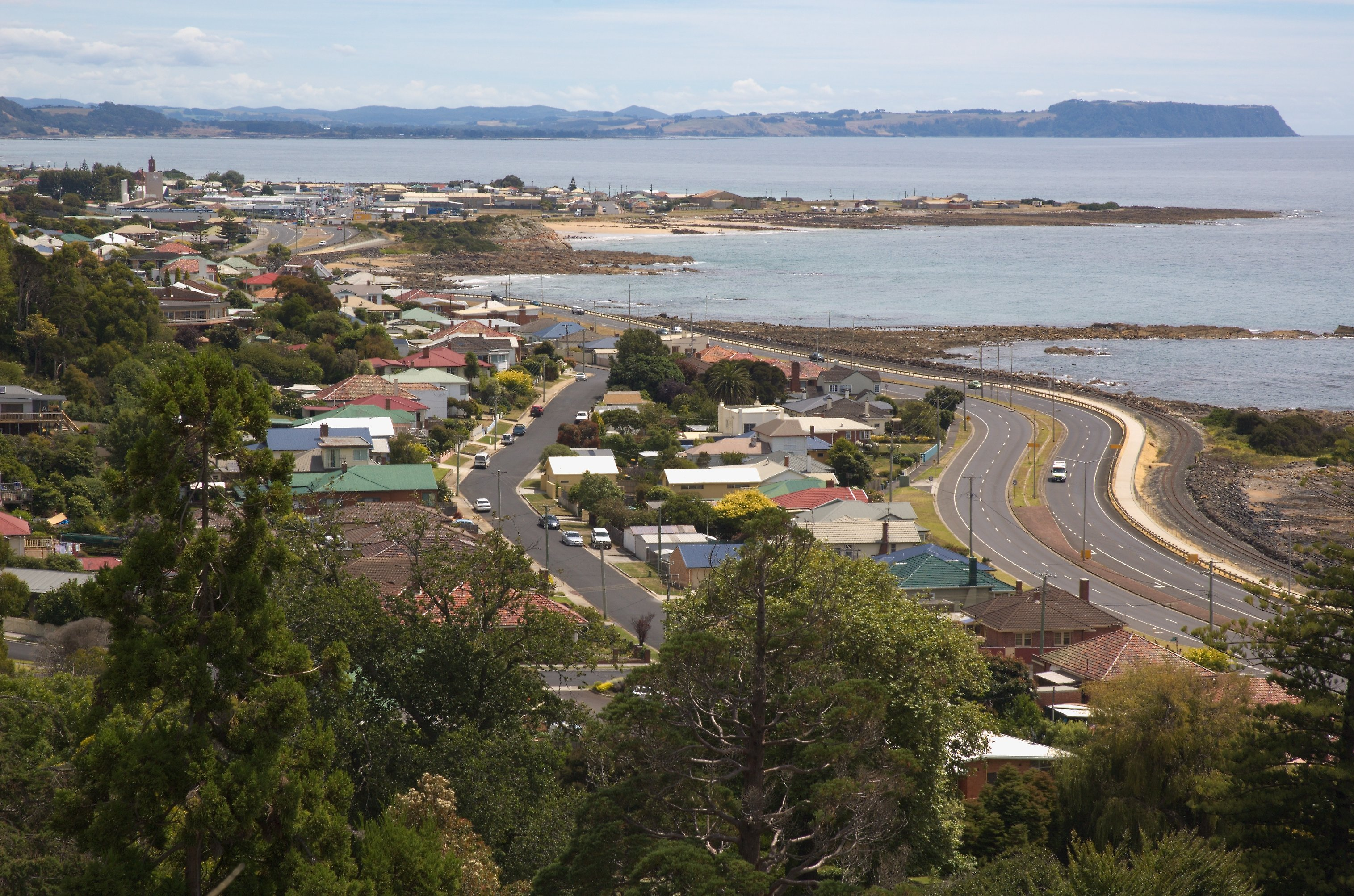
- Coast and Bass Highway

- Interactive map of Parklands
- Coordinates: 41.047°S 145.892°E
- Country: Australia
- State: Tasmania
- Region: North-west and west
- City: Burnie
- LGA: City of Burnie
- Location: 3 km (1.9 mi) NW of Burnie

Government
  - State electorate: Braddon
  - Federal division: Braddon

Population
  - Total: 865 (2021 census)
- Postcode: 7320
Suburbs around Parklands
Cooee	Bass Strait	Bass Strait
Cooee	Parklands	Burnie
Park Grove	Park Grove	Montello

Parklands is a residential locality in the local government area (LGA) of Burnie in the North-west and west LGA region of Tasmania. The locality is about 3 kilometres (1.9 mi) north-west of the town of Burnie. The 2016 census recorded a population of 850 for the state suburb of Parklands. It is a suburb of the Burnie, in north-west Tasmania.

The visitor information centre for Burnie is called The Makers' Workshop and is a place that honours Burnie's history, makers, innovators and artists. It highlights paper making and cheese making through workshops and has a gallery and cafe.

The Burnie War Memorial commemorates the fallen soldiers of the Great War.

Burnie Park has plenty of lush green lawns and ideal for picnics. It has a children's playground, waterfall and a music shell as some of its features.

The North West Regional Hospital is located on Brickport Road, Parklands.

== History ==
Parklands was gazetted as a locality in 1966.

== Geography ==
The waters of Bass Strait form the northern boundary.

== Road infrastructure ==
Route A2 (Bass Highway) runs through from north-east to north-west.

== Education ==
- Marist Regional College
