= Highclere, Tasmania =

Highclere
- Town
- Coordinates: 41°10′55″S 145°48′27″E
- Country: Australia
- State: Tasmania
- Region: North West
- LGA: Burnie
- Location: 18 km (11 mi) SW of Burnie

Government
  - State electorate: Braddon
  - Federal division: Braddon

Population
  - Total: 120 (2016 census)
- Postcode: 7321
Localities around Highclere
West Ridgley	Ridgley, East Ridgley	Upper Stowport
Tewkesbury, West Ridgley	Highclere	Upper Natone
Tewkesbury	Hampshire	Upper Natone

Highclere is a locality and small rural community in the local government area of Burnie in the North West region of Tasmania. It is located about 18 kilometres (11 mi) south-west of the town of Burnie. The 2016 census determined a population of 120 for the state suburb of Highclere.

== History ==
A rail siding was built in the area in 1903. The settlement that grew up around it was known as Oonah Road Siding until 1922, when it was changed to Highclere. The locality was gazetted in 1966.

== Geography ==
The Emu River forms the eastern boundary, and the Guide River forms the western boundary. The Melba rail line passes through from south-west to north.

== Road infrastructure ==
The B18 route (Ridgley Highway) passes through from south to north. Route C101 (Oonah Road) starts at an intersection with B18 and runs west before exiting.
