= Ridgley, Tasmania =

Ridgley
- Town
- Coordinates: 41°08′12″S 145°50′20″E
- Country: Australia
- State: Tasmania
- Region: North West
- LGA: Burnie
- Location: 13 km (8.1 mi) SW of Burnie

Government
  - State electorate: Braddon
  - Federal division: Braddon

Population
  - Total: 604 (2016 census)
- Postcode: 7321
Localities around Ridgley
Elliott	Mooreville, West Mooreville	Mooreville
West Ridgley	Ridgley	East Ridgley, Stowport
Tewkesbury	Highclere	East Ridgley

Ridgley is a locality and small rural community in the local government area of Burnie in the North West region of Tasmania. It is located about 13 kilometres (8.1 mi) south-west of the town of Burnie. The 2016 census determined a population of 604 for the state suburb of Ridgley.

== History ==
The area was named by surveyor Henry Hellyer in the 1920s. The locality was gazetted in 1966.

== Geography ==
The Pet River (including the Pet Reservoir) forms most of the south-eastern and eastern boundaries, and the Guide River forms the western boundary. The Melba rail line passes through from south to north-east.

== Road infrastructure ==
The B18 route (Ridgley Highway) passes through from south to north-east. Route C104 (West Ridgley Road) starts at an intersection with B18 and runs west before exiting. Route C108 (West Mooreville Road) runs north before exiting. Route C110 (Mooreville Road) starts at an intersection with B18 on the northern boundary and runs north to Mooreville.
