= Cam River (Tasmania) =

River in Tasmania, Australia

Coordinates: 41°03′S 145°50′E

Cam
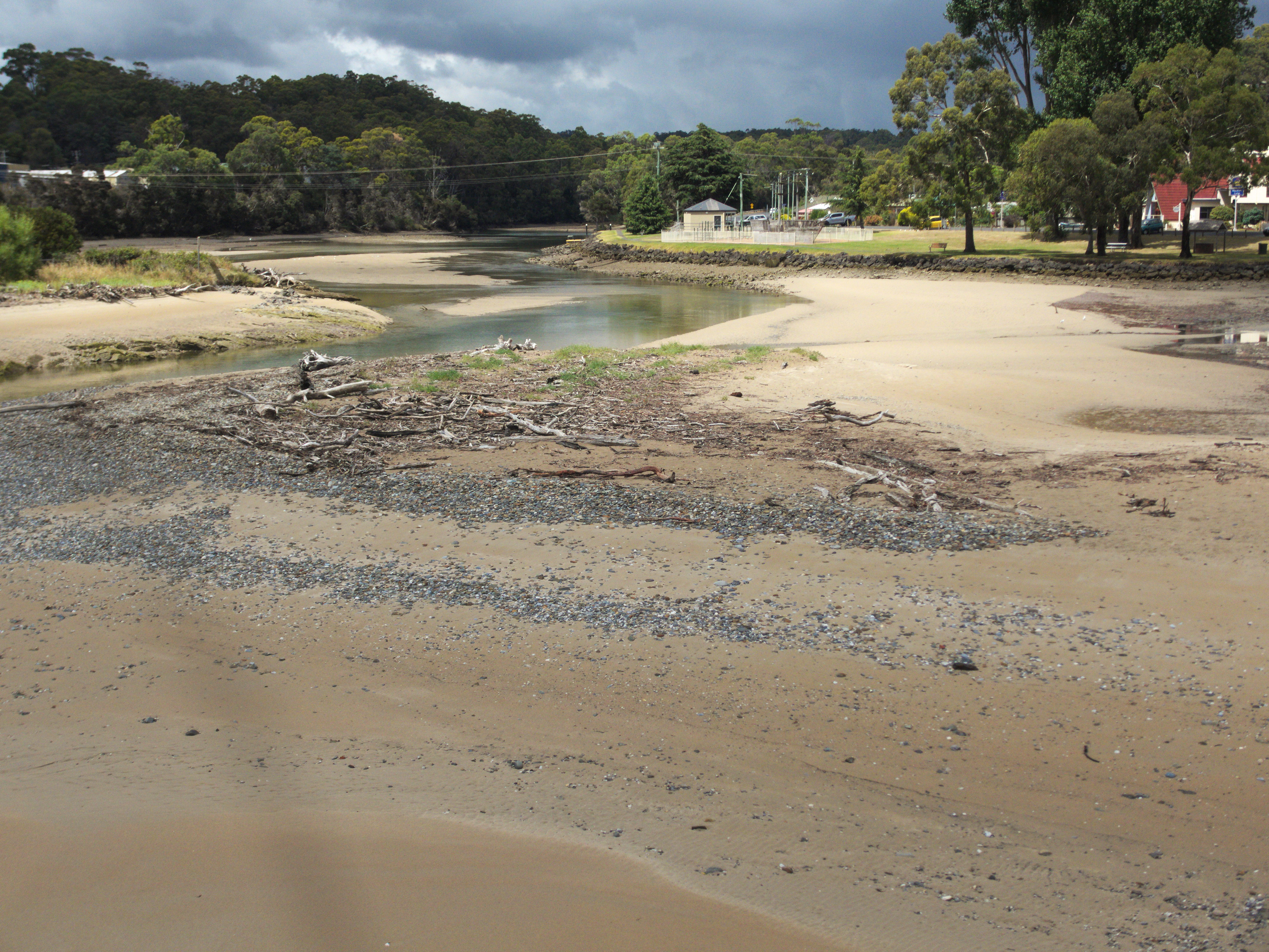
- The Cam River at Somerset Beach.

- Location of the mouth in Tasmania

Location
- Country: Australia
- State: Tasmania

Physical characteristics
- Source: below Mount Leslie
  - elevation: 302 m (991 ft)
- Mouth: Confluence with Bass Strait
  - location: Somerset, Tasmania
- Length: 35 km (22 mi)

The Cam River estuary is located in Somerset roughly halfway between the township of Wynyard and the city of Burnie on the North West Coast of Tasmania. The northern part of the Cam River forms part of the boundary between the City of Burnie and Waratah-Wynyard local government areas.

Popular for fishing, kayaks, swimming and other family leisure activities.

Amenities include boat ramp, walking tracks, toilets, playground, picnic and BBQ facilities.

The Park area is known locally as the "Boat Park" as it has a large wooden boat for children to play on. The Boat is called "Port Maldon" in recognition of the ship building history of this area of the Cam River.
