= Yolla, Tasmania =

Yolla
- Town
- Coordinates: 41°07′S 145°42′E
- Country: Australia
- State: Tasmania
- LGA: Waratah-Wynyard Council
- Location: 321 km (199 mi) NW of Hobart; 70 km (43 mi) W of Devonport; 22 km (14 mi) SW of Burnie; 18 km (11 mi) S of Wynyard

Government
  - State electorate: Braddon
  - Federal division: Braddon

Population
  - Total: 286 (SAL 2021)
- Postcode: 7325

Yolla is a rural community in north-western Tasmania, Australia. At the 2021 census, Yolla and the surrounding area had a population of 286. It is on the Murchison Highway about 20 kilometres (12 mi) south of the towns of Wynyard, Somerset and Burnie. The area around Yolla is used for dairying, beef cattle, growing vegetables, opium poppies and other crops, as well as forestry and mining. Local attractions are Hellyer Gorge and the Oldina Forest Reserve.

== History ==
Yolla was first settled in the 1880s. Camp Creek Post Office was open between 1881 and 1884. It reopened in 1905 and was renamed Yolla in 1906. The name is a Tasmanian Aboriginal word for the short-tailed shearwater or "muttonbird", a bird that played an important role in local Tasmanian Aboriginal culture. The area was originally covered by myrtle beech forest, which was gradually cleared for farming.

== Climate ==
Climate data for Yolla (Sea View) 1961–1990
Month	Jan	Feb	Mar	Apr	May	Jun	Jul	Aug	Sep	Oct	Nov	Dec	Year
Average rainfall mm (inches)	61.1 (2.41)	59.6 (2.35)	78.6 (3.09)	124.9 (4.92)	155.1 (6.11)	142.9 (5.63)	205.6 (8.09)	179.3 (7.06)	142.2 (5.60)	119.8 (4.72)	96.3 (3.79)	98.2 (3.87)	1,463.7 (57.63)
Source: Bureau of Meteorology (Climate Data Online)

== See also ==
- Yolla Football Club
