= Somerset, Tasmania =

Somerset Tasmania
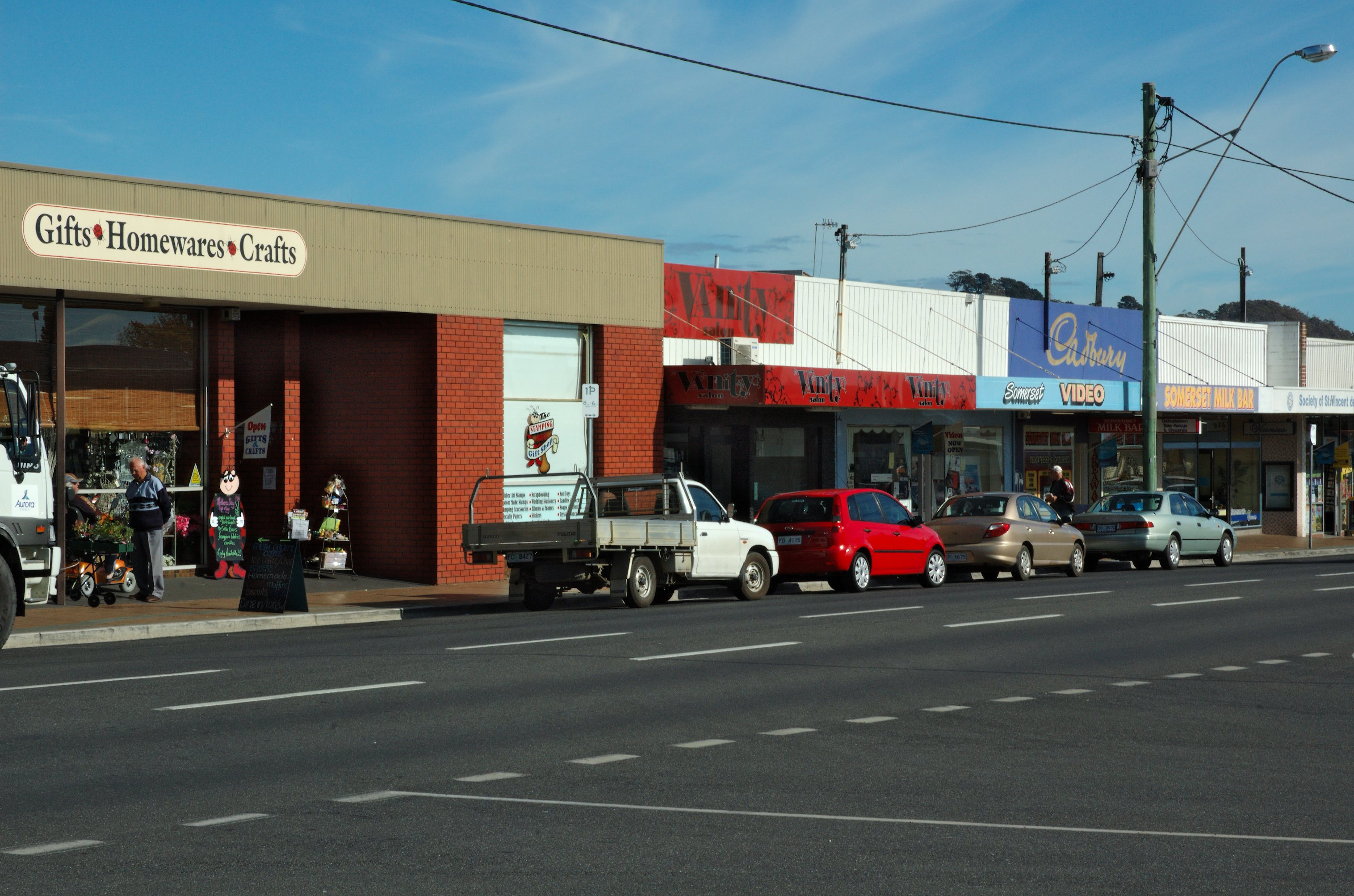
- Shops in Somerset

- Coordinates: 41°02′S 145°50′E
- Population: 4,067 (SAL 2021)
- Postcode(s): 7322
- Location: 309 km (192 mi) NW of Hobart; 154 km (96 mi) NW of Launceston; 55 km (34 mi) NW of Devonport; 8 km (5 mi) W of Burnie
- LGA(s): Waratah-Wynyard Council
- State electorate(s): Braddon
- Federal division(s): Braddon
Mean max temp	Mean min temp	Annual rainfall
16.7 °C; 62 °F	6.9 °C; 44 °F	998.3 mm 39.3 in

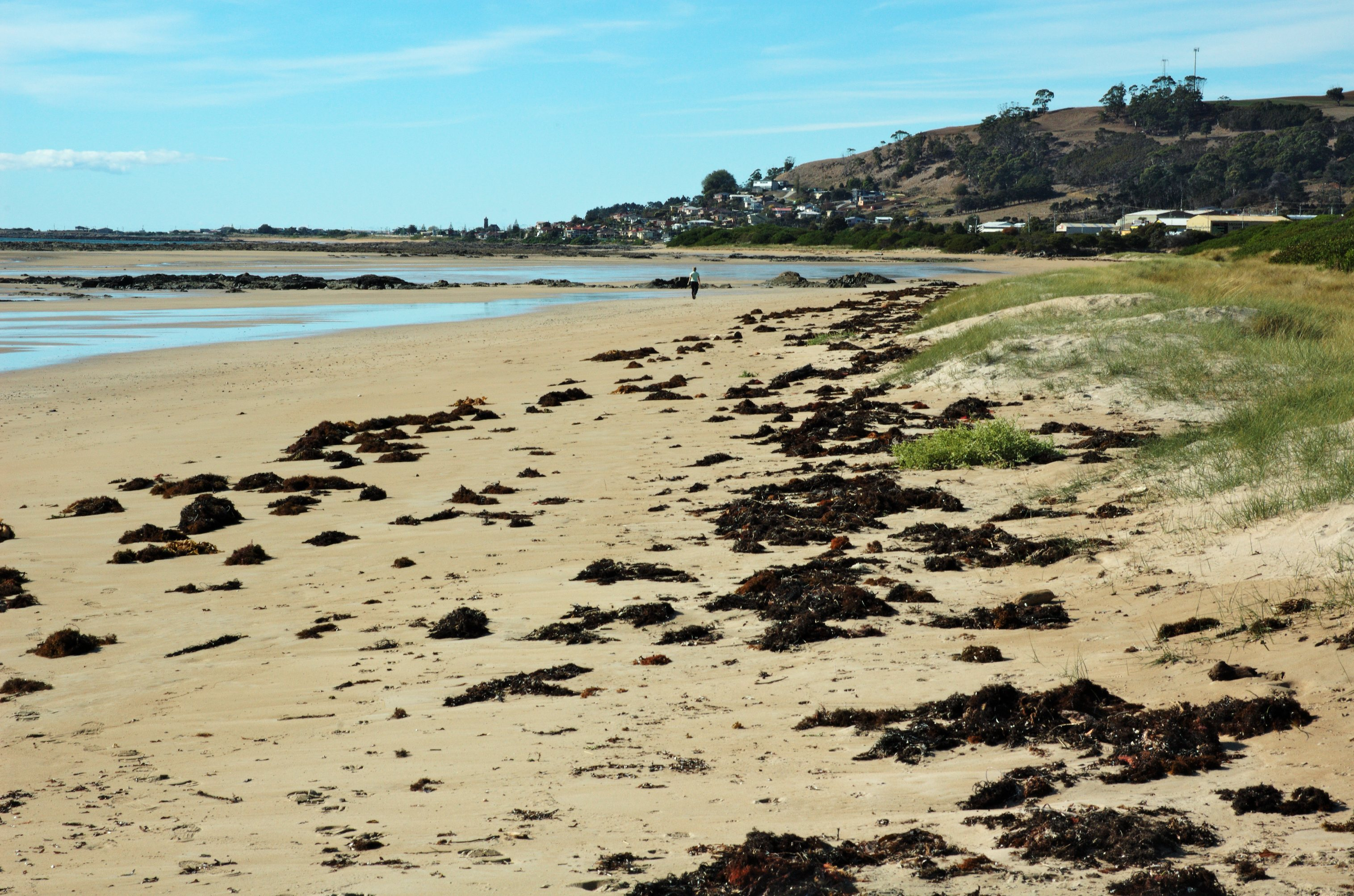
The beach at Somerset

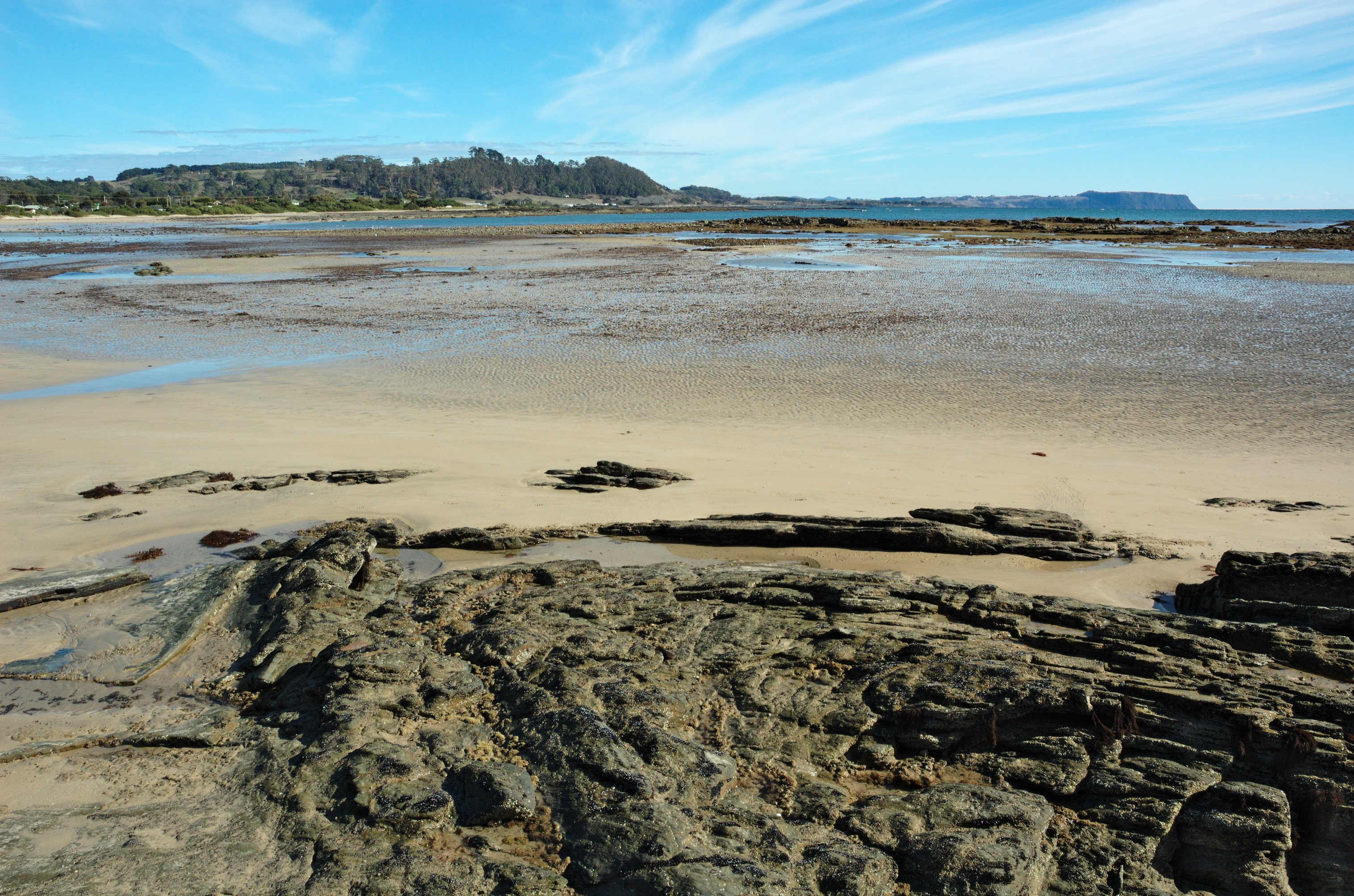
The beach at Somerset

Somerset is a small township to the west of Burnie, Tasmania, Australia, which shares its name with the County of Somerset, England, UK. Today the city of Burnie encompasses the entire Burnie-Somerset urban area; however, the town is part of the Waratah/Wynyard municipal area.

== History ==
Somerset River Cam Post Office opened on 5 November 1864. It was renamed Somerset Cam around 1934 and Somerset in 1963.

== Geography ==
Somerset is located on estuary on the western bank of the Cam River midway between the township of Wynyard and the city of Burnie. The Cam River is the borderline of where the Waratah-Wynyard Council meets the City of Burnie. A beach stretches along the full length of the Somerset coastline from the Cam River to the far western outskirts. Somerset has three parks, each with a playground. These are ANZAC Park (Bells Parade), The Cam River Reserve (Bass Highway), and Plover Park (Ronald Crescent).

=== Climate ===
The temperature in summer ranges from 12.5 °C to 21 °C, with drier days as warm as 30 °C, and around 16 hours of sunlight per day. In winter, temperatures range from 6 °C to 13 °C, and only 8 hours of sunlight.

== Demographics ==
At the 2021 census, Somerset had a population of 4,067. Of those, 47.5% are male, and 52.5% are female.

The median age of Somerset residents is 48 years old, exceeding both that of Tasmania (42) and Australia as a whole (38).

85.9% of Somerset residents are born in Australia. The next most common countries of birth are England (3.3%), New Zealand (0.6%), Scotland (0.4%), Germany (0.3%), and the Philippines (0.3%).

== Economy ==
There are a number of small businesses in Somerset with almost all along the main street.

Notable industries in Somerset include: Gunns Veneers, which is one of only three production facilities in Australasia. Gunns Veneers is Australasia's largest producer of sliced veneers and the world's largest producer of Eucalypt veneers. The Burnie branch of William Adams. William Adams is a CAT Rental Dealer as well as a servicing department. They specialize in the repairing, maintenance and modifications of heavy machinery used for mining, forestry and agriculture.

== Community ==
=== Coastal Pathway ===
The development of a coastal pathway will connect Somerset and Burnie to Wynyard and Latrobe as part of a State Government and Local Government Council initiative to upgrade infrastructure on the north-west coast of Tasmania.

== Media ==
The Advocate is the local newspaper for the region, with its press and mailroom located in Burnie.

Somerset has access to all major television stations, including: ABC, SBS, WIN and Southern Cross.

== Sport ==
Somerset is home to five sporting venues: a football field, soccer field, tennis courts, a recreation centre and a surf lifesaving club.

== Education ==
Somerset does not have a public high school or college.

There is one public primary school in Somerset, Somerset Primary School, located at the site of the old West Somerset Primary School, after the two schools merged.

There is one private school in Somerset, the Burnie branch of Australian Christian College, which is located on the outskirts of the town on Seabrook Road.

== Transport ==
Somerset is connected to the surrounding areas by the Bass Highway which runs through the town following the coast. Somerset is also connected to the West Coast by the Murchison Highway which begins beside the Cam River.

The only public transport in the area is Metro Tasmania which offers bus services from Wynyard to Burnie.

The railway station closed to passenger trains with the ending of the Tasman Limited in 1978. The station building has been demolished but the platform and rail line are still in place.

The Burnie Airport is located in the township of Wynyard, a 15-minute drive away.
