= Lower Longley =

Coordinates: 42°58′39″S 147°08′29″E

Lower Longley Hobart, Tasmania
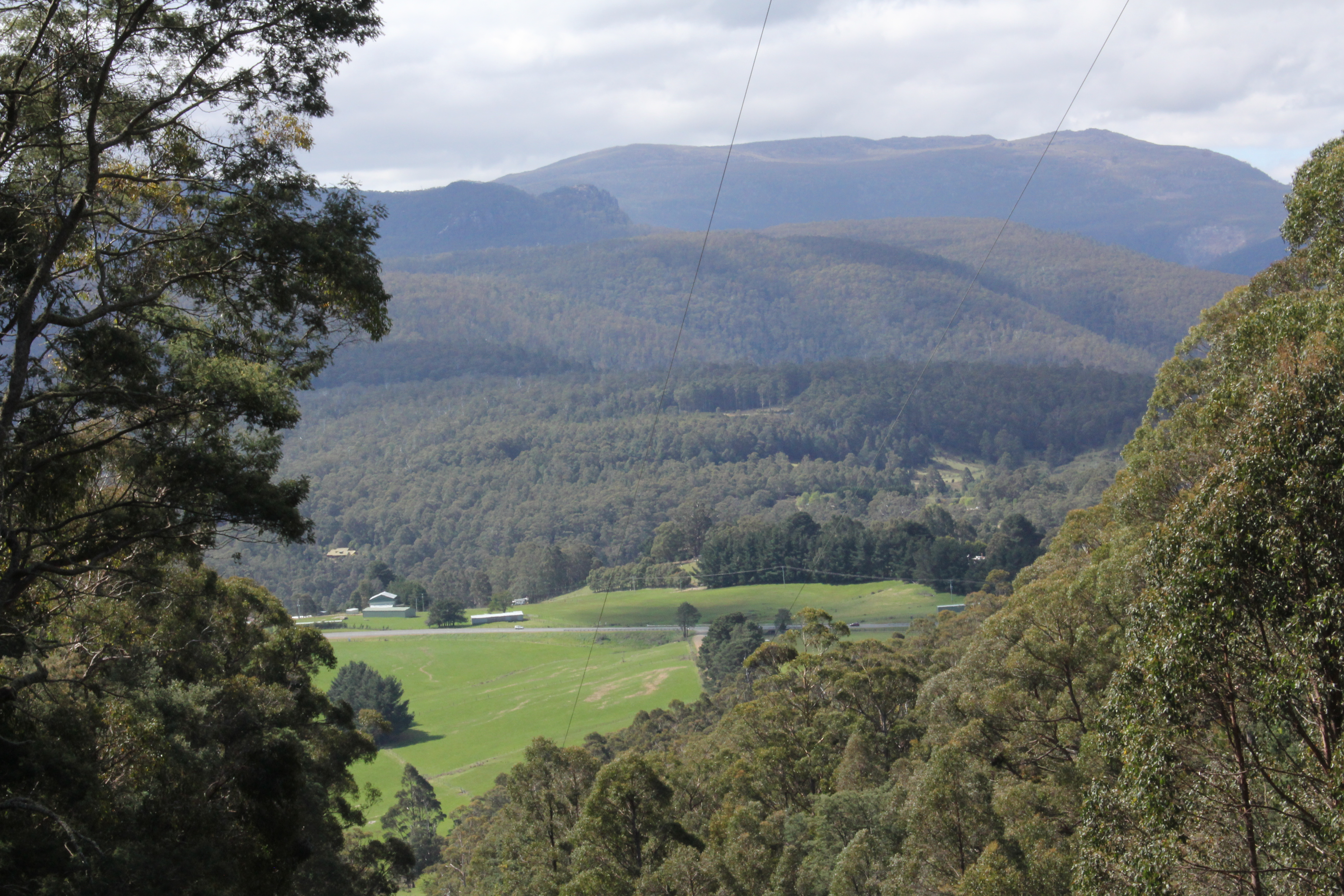
- The highest point of the Huon Highway at Vinces Saddle in Lower Longley
- Population: 267 (SAL 2021)
- Postcode(s): 7109
- LGA(s): Huon Valley, Kingborough.
- State electorate(s): Clark; Franklin
- Federal division(s): Clark; Franklin
Suburbs around Lower Longley:
Mountain River	Longley	Mount Wellington
Grove	Lower Longley	Sandfly
Pelverata	Kaoota	Allens Rivulet

Lower Longley is a rural locality situated on the borders of the Kingborough and Huon Valley local government areas, which straddles the Huon Highway and is made up primarily of acreage properties. Lower Longley had 131 inhabitants as of the 2011 Australian Census. Despite being called Lower Longley, the suburb is physically higher than neighbouring Longley.

== History ==
The Lower Longley State School was opened some time before 1900, before being replaced by a newer school in 1941 after complaints of the conditions at the school being "disgraceful" The school closed at some point.

Lower Longley has had numerous churches in its history, including a Wesleyan church opened 1890 however the last church in Lower Longley was burnt down in the 1967 fires and relocated afterwards to Sandfly to become St. Lukes.

In 1898 the township of Lower Longley was mostly destroyed in a severe fire

Lower Longley includes a town hall – the original of which was opened in 1907 by the Premier of Tasmania and later replaced after the 1967 bushfires which destroyed the original building. There remains an early 20th-century Methodist cemetery, orphaned following the loss of its church in the same fire.

Lower Longely is home to the transmission sites for 87.8 Pulse FM Kingborough and Huon and 98.5 Huon FM on Mt Herringback. Mt Herringback in Lower Longely is also the main communications hub for the Huon Valley, with all Optus, Vodafone, Telstra, NBN and Tasmanet voice, SMS and data traffic for the Huon Valley passing through Mt Herringback.
