= Sandfly (disambiguation) =

Sandfly may refer to:

== Biology ==
- Sandfly
- Phlebotominae

== Places ==
- Sandfly, Georgia
- Sandfly, Tasmania
- Sandfly Colliery Tramway
- Sandfly Bay
- Sandfly, an island among the Nggela Islands of the Solomon Islands

== Ships ==
- HMS Sandfly, several ships
