= Tasmanian Government Railways M class =

Tasmanian Government Railways M class may refer to:

- Tasmanian Government Railways M class (1912)
- Tasmanian Government Railways M class (1952)
