= Mountain River, Tasmania =

Locality in Tasmania, Australia

Mountain River
- Town
- Coordinates: 42°56′24″S 147°07′12″E
- Country: Australia
- State: Tasmania
- Region: South-east
- LGA: Huon Valley Council
- Location: 15 km (9.3 mi) NE of Huonville

Government
  - State electorate: Franklin
  - Federal division: Franklin

Population
  - Total: 559 (2016 census)
- Postcode: 7109
Localities around Mountain River
Wellington Park	Wellington Park	Wellington Park
Wellington Park, Crabtree	Mountain River	Wellington Park, Lower Longley
Crabtree	Grove, Lower Longley	Lower Longley

Mountain River is a rural locality in the local government area (LGA) of Huon Valley in the South-east LGA region of Tasmania. The locality is about 15 kilometres (9.3 mi) north-east of the town of Huonville. The 2016 census recorded a population of 559 for the state suburb of Mountain River. The locality increasingly is a lifestyle destination, being only about 30 minutes south of the Tasmanian capital Hobart by road.

Neighbouring localities are Grove, Crabtree, Lower Longley, Lucaston, Collinsvale and Lachlan. Mountain River is named for a stream that rises in the Wellington Range and flows through the Mountain River and Huon valleys to join the Huon River near Huonville. Its major tributary, the Crabtree Rivulet, also rises in the Wellington Range.

== History ==
Mountain River was gazetted as a locality in 1970.

== Geography ==
Mountain River (the watercourse), a tributary of the Huon River, flows through from north to south.

== Road infrastructure ==
Route C617 (Mountain River Road) enters from the south and runs through to the centre, where it ends.
