= Leslie Vale, Tasmania =

Leslie Vale
- Town
- Coordinates: 42°57′59″S 147°13′33″E
- Country: Australia
- State: Tasmania
- Region: Hobart
- LGA: Kingborough
- Location: 8 km (5.0 mi) W of Kingston

Government
  - State electorate: Franklin
  - Federal division: Franklin

Population
  - Total: 351 (2016 census)
- Postcode: 7054
Localities around Leslie Vale
Neika	Neika	Kingston
Longley	Leslie Vale	Kingston
Longley	Longley	Margate

Leslie Vale is a rural residential locality in the local government area (LGA) of Kingborough in the Hobart LGA region of Tasmania. The locality is about 8 kilometres (5.0 mi) west of the town of Kingston. The 2016 census recorded a population of 351 for the state suburb of Leslie Vale.

== History ==
Leslie Vale was gazetted as a locality in 1970. A post office of this name opened in 1946.

== Geography ==
Most of the boundaries are survey lines. The North West Bay River forms part of the southern boundary.

== Road infrastructure ==
The Huon Highway runs through from north-east to south-west.
