= Kaoota, Tasmania =

Kaoota
- Town
- Coordinates: 43°01′35″S 147°09′55″E
- Country: Australia
- State: Tasmania
- Region: Hobart, South-east
- LGA: Kingborough, Huon Valley
- Location: 18 km (11 mi) SW of Kingston

Government
  - State electorate: Franklin
  - Federal division: Franklin
- Elevation: 408 m (1,339 ft)

Population
  - Total: 202 (2016 census)
- Postcode: 7150
- Gazetted: 1971
Localities around Kaoota
Sandfly	Sandfly	Allens Rivulet
Sandfly, Pelverata	Kaoota	Allens Rivulet
Pelverata	Pelverata	Margate

Kaoota is a rural residential locality in the local government areas (LGA) of Kingborough and Huon Valley in the Hobart and South-east LGA regions of Tasmania. The locality is about 18 kilometres (11 mi) south-west of the town of Kingston. The 2016 census recorded a population of 202 for the state suburb of Kaoota.

== History ==
Kaoota was gazetted as a locality in 1971. The name is believed to be an Aboriginal word for “dusk”.

The area was originally settled as a coal mining town.

== Geography ==
Most of the boundaries are survey lines.

== Road infrastructure ==
Route C621 (Pelverata Road) runs through from north to south-west.
