= Neika =

- Suburb
- Coordinates: 42°56′53″S 147°14′11″E
- Country: Australia
- State: Tasmania
- Region: Hobart
- LGA: Hobart, Kingborough
- Location: 20 km (12 mi) SW of Hobart

Government
  - State electorate: Franklin, Clark
  - Federal division: Franklin, Clark

Population
  - Total: 198 (2016 census)
- Postcode: 7054
Suburbs around Neika
Wellington Park	Wellington Park	Fern Tree
Wellington Park, Longley	Neika	Kingston
Longley	Leslie Vale	Leslie Vale

Neika is a semi-rural suburb of Hobart, to the north-west of Kingston.

== History ==
Neika is believed to be an Aboriginal word for “hill”.

Neika Post Office opened on 13 January 1913 and closed in 1969.

== Locality ==
Neika was gazetted as a locality in 1970. It is a rural locality in the local government areas (LGA) of Hobart and Kingborough in the Hobart LGA region of Tasmania. The 2016 census recorded a population of 198 for the state suburb of Neika. Long Creek forms much of the northern boundary. The North West Bay River flows through the south-west corner.

== Road infrastructure ==
Route B64 (Huon Road) runs through from south to north.
