= Grove, Tasmania =

Locality in Tasmania, Australia

Grove
- Town
- Coordinates: 42°59′40″S 147°06′45″E
- Country: Australia
- State: Tasmania
- Region: South-east
- LGA: Huon Valley
- Location: 10 km (6.2 mi) NE of Huonville

Government
  - State electorate: Franklin
  - Federal division: Franklin
- Elevation: 65 m (213 ft)

Population
  - Total: 533 (SAL 2021)
- Postcode: 7109
- Mean max temp: 17.7 °C (63.9 °F)
- Mean min temp: 5.8 °C (42.4 °F)
- Annual rainfall: 735.5 mm (28.96 in)
Localities around Grove
Crabtree	Mountain River	Mountain River
Crabtree, Lucaston	Grove	Lower Longley
Huonville	Huonville	Pelverata

Grove is a rural locality in the local government area (LGA) of Huon Valley in the South-east region of Tasmania, Australia. The locality is 35 km southwest of Hobart and 7 km north-east of the town of Huonville. As a rural locality, there are no urban settlements in Grove. The 2016 census does not provide a population for the locality of Grove. It covers an area of approximately 30.8 km^{2}. The postcode for Grove is 7109.

The localities which adjoin Grove are Collinsvale, Crabtree, Mountain River, Lachlan, Longley, Lower Longley and Lucaston.

== History ==
The first non-Aboriginal occupation of Grove was the farm property Grove Estate, by Silas Parsons in 1839. Grove was gazetted as a locality in 1970.

== Geography ==
Mountain River, a tributary of the Huon River, flows from north-east to south-west through the northern part of Grove, and then forms much of its western boundary. Most of the part of Grove southeast of the Huon Highway (12.7 km^{2}) is hilly and remains forested, whereas most of the part northwest of the Huon Highway (18.1 km^{2}) is undulating and cleared for agriculture - chiefly grazing and orchards. Huonville is the nearest service centre for Grove, which contains few facilities or services.

=== Climate ===
Grove experiences an oceanic climate (Köppen: Cfb) with very mild, drier summers and relatively cool, wetter winters. On average, the town only has 32.7 clear days whilst having 133.5 cloudy days per annum. The wettest recorded day was 23 April 1960 with 154.7 mm (6.09 in) of rainfall. Extreme temperatures ranged from 40.9 °C (105.6 °F) on 4 January 2013 to −7.5 °C (18.5 °F) on 24 June 1972.

A former weather station recorded climate data from 1952 to 2010. This included temperature, precipitation, 3 pm conditions and sunshine.

Climate data for Grove (Comparison) (42.98°S 147.08°E) (63 m (207 ft) AMSL) (1952-2010)
Month	Jan	Feb	Mar	Apr	May	Jun	Jul	Aug	Sep	Oct	Nov	Dec	Year
Record high °C (°F)	40.4 (104.7)	39.7 (103.5)	37.3 (99.1)	31.7 (89.1)	25.1 (77.2)	21.0 (69.8)	19.7 (67.5)	23.6 (74.5)	28.6 (83.5)	32.2 (90.0)	36.6 (97.9)	37.2 (99.0)	40.4 (104.7)
Mean daily maximum °C (°F)	22.3 (72.1)	22.4 (72.3)	20.5 (68.9)	17.6 (63.7)	14.5 (58.1)	12.1 (53.8)	11.8 (53.2)	13.0 (55.4)	14.9 (58.8)	16.9 (62.4)	18.5 (65.3)	20.3 (68.5)	17.1 (62.7)
Mean daily minimum °C (°F)	9.4 (48.9)	9.4 (48.9)	8.0 (46.4)	6.2 (43.2)	4.3 (39.7)	2.4 (36.3)	2.0 (35.6)	2.7 (36.9)	4.1 (39.4)	5.7 (42.3)	7.1 (44.8)	8.6 (47.5)	5.8 (42.5)
Record low °C (°F)	0.3 (32.5)	−0.6 (30.9)	−1.7 (28.9)	−3.4 (25.9)	−5.5 (22.1)	−7.5 (18.5)	−5.6 (21.9)	−4.6 (23.7)	−5.7 (21.7)	−3.2 (26.2)	−1.8 (28.8)	−1.4 (29.5)	−7.5 (18.5)
Average precipitation mm (inches)	46.6 (1.83)	47.1 (1.85)	48.3 (1.90)	60.7 (2.39)	58.6 (2.31)	61.4 (2.42)	71.9 (2.83)	78.0 (3.07)	74.7 (2.94)	69.1 (2.72)	65.7 (2.59)	62.4 (2.46)	744.7 (29.32)
Average precipitation days (≥ 0.2 mm)	10.3	9.0	10.8	12.8	14.3	14.4	16.3	16.2	16.1	16.0	14.5	12.7	163.4
Average afternoon relative humidity (%)	53	53	56	60	67	71	68	63	59	58	58	56	60
Average dew point °C (°F)	9.6 (49.3)	10.2 (50.4)	9.2 (48.6)	7.9 (46.2)	6.8 (44.2)	5.3 (41.5)	4.7 (40.5)	4.5 (40.1)	5.1 (41.2)	6.4 (43.5)	7.9 (46.2)	8.8 (47.8)	7.2 (45.0)
Mean monthly sunshine hours	238.7	209.1	179.8	144.0	114.7	93.0	111.6	139.5	159.0	195.1	204.0	220.1	2,008.6
Percentage possible sunshine	52	54	47	44	38	34	38	43	45	48	47	46	45
Source: Bureau of Meteorology (1952-2010)

A newer weather station opened in 2004. It records climate data for temperature and precipitation.

Climate data for Grove (Research Station) (42.98°S 147.08°E) (65 m (213 ft) AMSL) (2004-2025)
Month	Jan	Feb	Mar	Apr	May	Jun	Jul	Aug	Sep	Oct	Nov	Dec	Year
Record high °C (°F)	40.9 (105.6)	37.2 (99.0)	38.3 (100.9)	30.4 (86.7)	23.4 (74.1)	19.5 (67.1)	19.0 (66.2)	22.8 (73.0)	27.4 (81.3)	31.6 (88.9)	34.5 (94.1)	37.1 (98.8)	40.9 (105.6)
Mean daily maximum °C (°F)	23.6 (74.5)	22.8 (73.0)	21.3 (70.3)	18.1 (64.6)	15.0 (59.0)	12.6 (54.7)	12.4 (54.3)	13.6 (56.5)	15.4 (59.7)	17.2 (63.0)	19.2 (66.6)	21.2 (70.2)	17.7 (63.9)
Mean daily minimum °C (°F)	9.9 (49.8)	9.2 (48.6)	8.0 (46.4)	5.9 (42.6)	4.2 (39.6)	2.3 (36.1)	2.1 (35.8)	2.8 (37.0)	4.3 (39.7)	5.5 (41.9)	7.2 (45.0)	8.5 (47.3)	5.8 (42.5)
Record low °C (°F)	0.9 (33.6)	0.1 (32.2)	−0.6 (30.9)	−2.9 (26.8)	−6.0 (21.2)	−5.2 (22.6)	−4.7 (23.5)	−4.6 (23.7)	−3.3 (26.1)	−2.8 (27.0)	−1.2 (29.8)	0.3 (32.5)	−6.0 (21.2)
Average precipitation mm (inches)	40.0 (1.57)	43.2 (1.70)	41.9 (1.65)	45.2 (1.78)	67.6 (2.66)	69.0 (2.72)	68.9 (2.71)	85.7 (3.37)	78.7 (3.10)	70.9 (2.79)	57.5 (2.26)	64.2 (2.53)	735.5 (28.96)
Average precipitation days (≥ 0.2 mm)	10.5	10.7	12.0	14.1	17.2	17.3	19.0	19.1	17.6	17.4	14.8	14.3	184
Source: Bureau of Meteorology (2004-2025)

== Road infrastructure ==
The Huon Highway (route A6) enters from the north-east from the direction of Hobart and runs through Grove to the south-west, where it exits towards Huonville. It is the major road in Grove. Route C617 (Mountain River Road) starts at an intersection with A6 and runs northward through Grove until it exits, following the Mountain River. Route C618 (Crabtree Road) starts at an intersection with C617 and runs north-west until it exits Grove. Route C619 (Lollara Road) starts at an intersection with A6 and runs west until it exits, eventually following the left bank of the Huon River, then the right bank, downstream to Huonville. Together these three roads form the basis of the road network in Grove. There are no railways in Grove.
