= New Town Rivulet =

Coordinates: 42°50′47″S 147°18′54″E

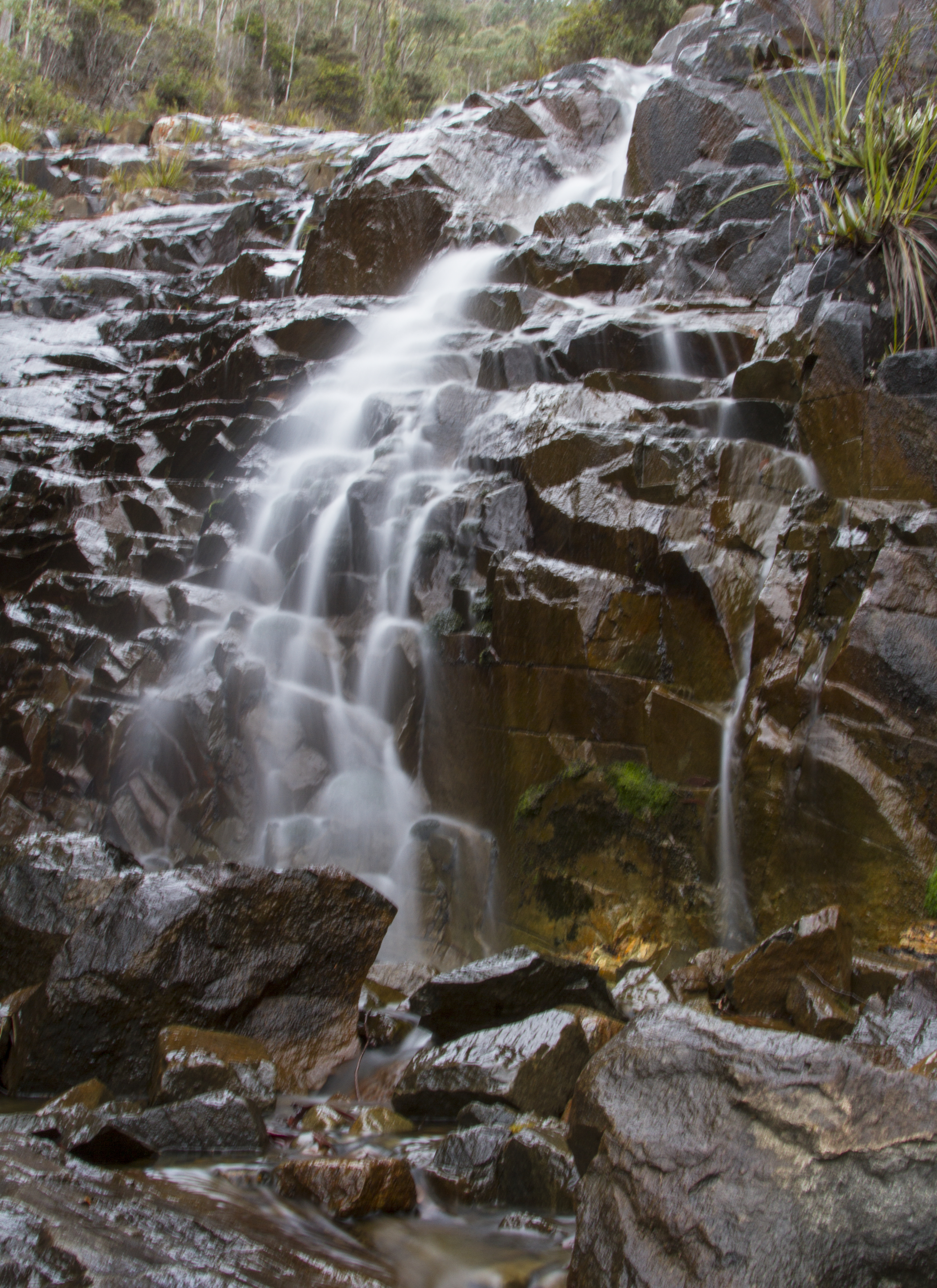
- A waterfall near the headwaters of the New Town Rivulet

Location
- Country: Australia

The New Town Rivulet (commonly known as Newtown Creek) is a permanently flowing creek in Hobart, Tasmania, that has as its headwaters the springs and snow water run-offs of Mount Wellington.

== Location ==
The New Town Rivulet flows from its headwaters though the Hobart suburbs of Lenah Valley, New Town and Moonah to New Town Bay in the River Derwent.

== Headwaters ==
The rivulet is fed by a number of underground springs in the Wellington Range.

== Environmental condition ==
In 2025 the Hobart and Glenorchy city councils started a project to revegetate the mouth of the rivulet by removing concrete and adding plants.

In 2024, the New Town Rivulet Platypus Landcare group was formed with a view to improve the environment for the platypus inhabiting the rivulet. In 2025, City of Hobart responded to the Landcare group’s request to develop an environmental plan for the rivulet. While this work has been completed, the plan has not yet been released.
