= Margate Train =

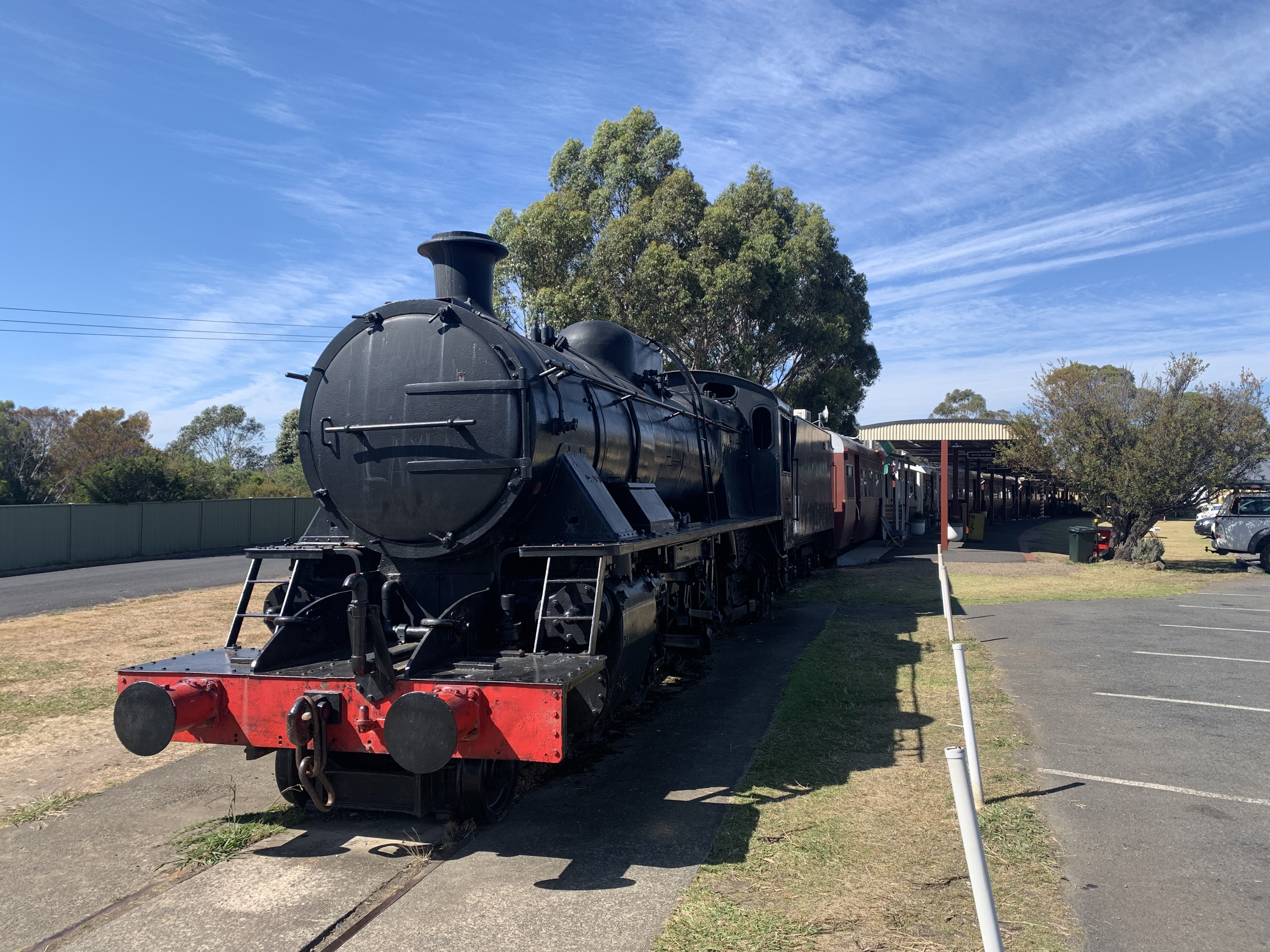
- The Margate Train in 2024
- Location: Margate, Tasmania, Australia
- Coordinates: 43.0186718°S 147.2696041°E
- Address: 1567 Channel Highway
- Opened: 1978
- Num. of stores: 12
- Website: www.facebook.com/margatetrain/

The Margate Train is a tourist attraction and shopping area located adjacent to the Channel Highway in Margate, Tasmania. It includes a number of shops and outlets housed within former Tasmanian Government Railways rolling stock. It is located approximately 18 kilometres from Hobart.

== Train ==
The Margate Train site consists of a plinthed steam locomotive, carriages, and two sheds. The locomotive is MA3, a Tasmanian Government Railways MA class from 1952. The carriages consist of Articulated Country Saloon (ACS) carriage #1, an SS class suburban carriage, and a DP class railmotor. Following the cessation of passenger services Tasmania in 1978, the vehicles were sold to private buyers.

The train was originally a roadside park, and was retained in original red livery. Sometime after 1987, the locomotive and carriages were painted black and brown respectively. None of the rolling stock operated in such livery.

Contrary to some tourist information, the steam engine never hauled the Tasman Limited service, but ACS carriage #1 was purpose-built for this task which operated until 1978.

== Retail destination ==
The Margate Train currently houses a variety of retail businesses including arts and crafts, bric-a-brac, a specialist book exchange, a collectible toys carriage and a buffet car specialising in pancakes, hence the Margate Train's local nickname, the Pancake Train. Nearby is a large antiques and second hand warehouse, located in an old Henry Jones IXL apple packing shed.
