= Crabtree, Tasmania =

Locality in Tasmania, Australia

Crabtree
- Town
- Coordinates: 42°56′07″S 147°03′07″E
- Country: Australia
- State: Tasmania
- Region: South-east
- LGA: Huon Valley
- Location: 15 km (9.3 mi) N of Huonville

Government
  - State electorate: Franklin
  - Federal division: Franklin

Population
  - Total: 292 (2016 census)
- Postcode: 7109
Localities around Crabtree
Wellington Park	Wellington Park	Wellington Park
Judbury	Crabtree	Mountain River, Grove
Judbury	Lucaston	Grove

Crabtree is a rural residential locality in the local government area of Huon Valley in the South-east region of Tasmania. It is located about 15 kilometres (9.3 mi) north of the town of Huonville. The 2016 census recorded a population of 292 for the state suburb of Crabtree.

== History ==
Crabtree was gazetted as a locality in 1970. The name has been in use since 1874.

== Geography ==
Mountain River (the watercourse) forms a part of the south-eastern boundary. Crabtree Rivulet rises in the north-west and flows through the locality to the south-east, where it empties into Mountain River.

== Road infrastructure ==
The C618 route (Crabtree Road) enters from the south-east and runs north-west for a short distance before it ends. Crabtree Road continues north-west with no route number. Route C645 (Cross Road) starts at an intersection with C618 and runs south-west until it exits.
