= Longley, Tasmania =

Longley
- Town
- Coordinates: 42°58′01″S 147°12′00″E
- Country: Australia
- State: Tasmania
- Region: Hobart
- LGA: Kingborough
- Location: 13 km (8.1 mi) W of Kingston

Government
  - State electorate: Franklin, Clark
  - Federal division: Franklin, Clark

Population
  - Total: 234 (2016 census)
- Postcode: 7150
Localities around Longley
Lower Longley	Wellington Park	Neika
Lower Longley	Longley	Leslie Vale, Neika
Sandfly, Lower Longley	Sandfly	Sandfly

Longley is a rural residential locality in the local government area of Kingborough in the Hobart region of Tasmania. It is located about 13 kilometres (8.1 mi) west of the town of Kingston. The 2016 census recorded a population of 234 for the state suburb of Longley.

== History ==
Longley was gazetted as a locality in 1970. The name has been used for the area since 1879, probably named for an early settler.

== Geography ==
The Huon Highway forms the southern and much of the western boundaries.

== Road infrastructure ==
The B64 route (Huon Road / Sandfly Road) enters from the east and runs south-west and south to the southern boundary, where it ends at an intersection with A6.
