= Allens Rivulet, Tasmania =

Allens Rivulet Tasmania
- Coordinates: 43°00′58″S 147°11′44″E
- Population: 506 (2021 census)
- Established: 1971
- Postcode(s): 7150
- Location: 15 km (9 mi) SW of Kingston
- LGA(s): Kingborough
- Region: Hobart
- State electorate(s): Franklin, Clark
- Federal division(s): Franklin, Clark
Localities around Allens Rivulet:
Sandfly	Sandfly	Margate
Sandfly, Kaoota	Allens Rivulet	Margate
Kaoota	Margate, Kaoota	Margate

Allens Rivulet is a rural residential locality in the local government area (LGA) of Kingborough in the Hobart LGA region of Tasmania. The locality is about 15 kilometres (9.3 mi) south-west of the town of Kingston. The 2021 census recorded a population of 506 for Allens Rivulet.

== History ==
Allens Rivulet was gazetted as a locality in 1971.

== Geography ==
Allens Rivulet (the stream) flows through from west to north-east. Most of the boundaries are survey lines.

== Road infrastructure ==
Route C622 (Sandfly Road) passes to the north. Access is provided by Allens Rivulet Road.
