= John Whelan (bushranger) =

Irish-Australian serial killer (1800–1855)

- Born: c. 1800; Wexford, Ireland
- Died: 26 June 1855; Hobart Gaol, Hobart, Tasmania, Australia
- Cause of death: Execution by hanging
- Other name: "Rocky" Whelan
- Conviction: Murder
- Penalty: Death

Details
- Victims: 5+
- Country: Australia
- State: Tasmania
- Date apprehended: 1855

John Whelan (c. 1800 – 1855), was an Irish-born bushranger and serial killer operating in the Huon Valley in 1855 in Van Diemen's Land (now the Australian state of Tasmania). He was a tall man for his times, standing at 6’1” (185 cm) and of heavy build, and was nicknamed Rocky for the crags and deep pock marks of his face.

== Crimes ==
Whelan was found guilty of stealing and sentenced to seven years in the Chester Quarter Sessions in 1827. He was put on the Marquis of Hastings and transported from England and arrived in Sydney on 31 July 1827. He escaped from the custody of the Crown and took to highway robbery for which he was arrested and tried in Sydney, then transported to Norfolk Island, where he was involved in the unsuccessful taking of the brig “Governor Phillip.”

For these crimes Rocky spent a total of eighteen years on Norfolk Island after which, in 1854 the penal colony closed and all the convicts were relocated to Port Arthur. He was sent to Hobart and was assigned to the public works gang. He only lasted two days before he absconded again, this time into the rugged bush land of Mount Wellington which stands over Hobart.

He roamed the countryside with Peter Connolly with whom he was incarcerated with on Norfolk Island, and the two took to highway robbery. Like all bushrangers in Tasmania, they targeted the many isolated homesteads for plunder; but they also roamed the forests ambushing lone travelers, robbing them. An argument one night in Hobart caused the two men to separate, only to come together again on the gallows months later.

== Capture and death ==
Whelan was captured on 19 May 1855 in Hobart outside a bootmaker shop. He had gone to the shop with a pair of boots he took off Magistrate Dunn. The boots had 'Dunn' branded on them and were left by the front door. A passing constable saw the boots that belonged to the missing Dunn and with the help of a civilian managed to arrest the outlaw. Whelan did try to use his weapon but it failed to fire. The decomposed body of Magistrate Dunn was found three days later on the slopes of Mount Wellington.

=== Confession of "Rocky" Whelan ===
After his capture, Whelan confessed to the murders of at least five men, including Dunn. When he was apprehended, he was still wearing the murdered man's clothes. Whelan described the location of the murder, and a search party was able to recover Dunn's badly decomposed body.

Whelan also confessed to murdering a man near Brown's River, thought to be a Mr. Grace, as well as the murder of an elderly man who was thought to be a Mr. Axford. The identities of the other two murdered men remained unknown.

Whelan was hanged at the Hobart Gaol with three other condemned men (including Connolly) on the infamous six-man scaffold.

He ranks alongside Alexander Pearce and Thomas Jeffrey as one of the most infamous criminals in Australia's colonial history.

== See also ==
- List of serial killers by country
