= HMS Sandfly =

Seven ships of the Royal Navy have borne the name HMS Sandfly. A sandfly is an irritating insect found near beaches.

- HMS Sandfly (1794) was a 4-gun Musquito-class floating battery launched in 1794. She was broken up in 1803.
- HMS Sandfly (1855) was an Albacore-class wooden screw gunboat launched in 1855. She was sold for scrap in 1867.
- HMS Sandfly (1863) was a two-gun paddle gunboat. She was formerly Tasmanian Maid and was purchased by the New Zealand colonial government for use in the New Zealand Wars in 1863. Wrecked on Kawarau Reef, New Plymouth, 1868.
- HMS Sandfly (1872) was a one-gun survey schooner launched in 1872. She was broken up in 1883.
- HMS Sandfly (1887) was a Grasshopper-class torpedo gunboat launched in 1887. She was sold in 1905.
- HMS Sandfly (1906) was a coastal destroyer launched in 1906. She was renamed TB-4 later in 1906 and sold in 1920.
- HMS Sandfly (1911) was an Acheron-class destroyer launched in 1911. She was sold in 1921.
