= 4-4-2+2-4-4 =

Locomotive wheel arrangement

4-4-2+2-4-4 (Double Atlantic)
Equivalent classifications
- UIC class: 2B1+1B2
- French class: 221+122
- Turkish class: 25+25
- Swiss class: 2/5+2/5, 4/10 from the 1920s
- Russian class: 2-2-1+1-2-2
First known tank engine version
- First use: 1912
- Country: Australia
- Locomotive: TGR M class
- Railway: Tasmanian Government Railways
- Designer: Beyer, Peacock & Company
- Builder: Beyer, Peacock & Company

Under the Whyte notation for the classification of steam locomotives by wheel arrangement, a 4-4-2+2-4-4 is a Garratt articulated locomotive. The wheel arrangement is effectively two 4-4-2 locomotives operating back to back, with each power unit having four leading wheels on two axles in a leading bogie, four powered and coupled driving wheels on two axles, and two trailing wheels on one axle in a trailing truck. Since the 4-4-2 type is usually known as an Atlantic, the corresponding Garratt type is often referred to as a Double Atlantic.

== Overview ==
The 4-4-2+2-4-4 was not a common Garratt wheel arrangement. Only ten were built, all by Beyer, Peacock & Company, the owner of the Garratt patent.

4-4-2+2-4-4 Garratt production list – All manufacturers
Gauge	Railway	Class	Works no.	Units	Year	Builder
3 ft 6 in	Tasmanian Government Railways	M	5523–5524	2	1912	Beyer, Peacock & Company
4 ft 8 1/2 in	Entre Ríos Railway, Argentina		6360–6364	5	1927	Beyer, Peacock & Company
4 ft 8 1/2 in	Argentine North Eastern Railway		6645–6647	3	1930	Beyer, Peacock & Company

== Usage ==
=== Argentina ===
Eight locomotives were built for Argentina to run on 4 ft 8 1/2 in (1,435 mm) standard gauge.

- Five were built for the Entre Ríos Railway in 1927.
- Another three were built for the Argentine North Eastern Railway in 1930.

After nationalization in 1948, all these locomotives were rostered on the General Urquiza Railway.

=== Australia ===
The first Garratt locomotives to be built to the 4-4-2+2-4-4 wheel arrangement were a pair of M class passenger locomotives for the 3 ft 6 in (1,067 mm) gauge Tasmanian Government Railways in Australia in 1912. They were acquired to haul express passenger trains between Launceston and Hobart.

The two M class engines were the only eight-cylinder Garratt locomotives in the world. They were difficult to maintain and, despite their haulage abilities and speed, both were withdrawn from service some time after the arrival of the R class in 1924 and scrapped in the late 1940s.
