= Lucaston, Tasmania =

Lucaston Tasmania
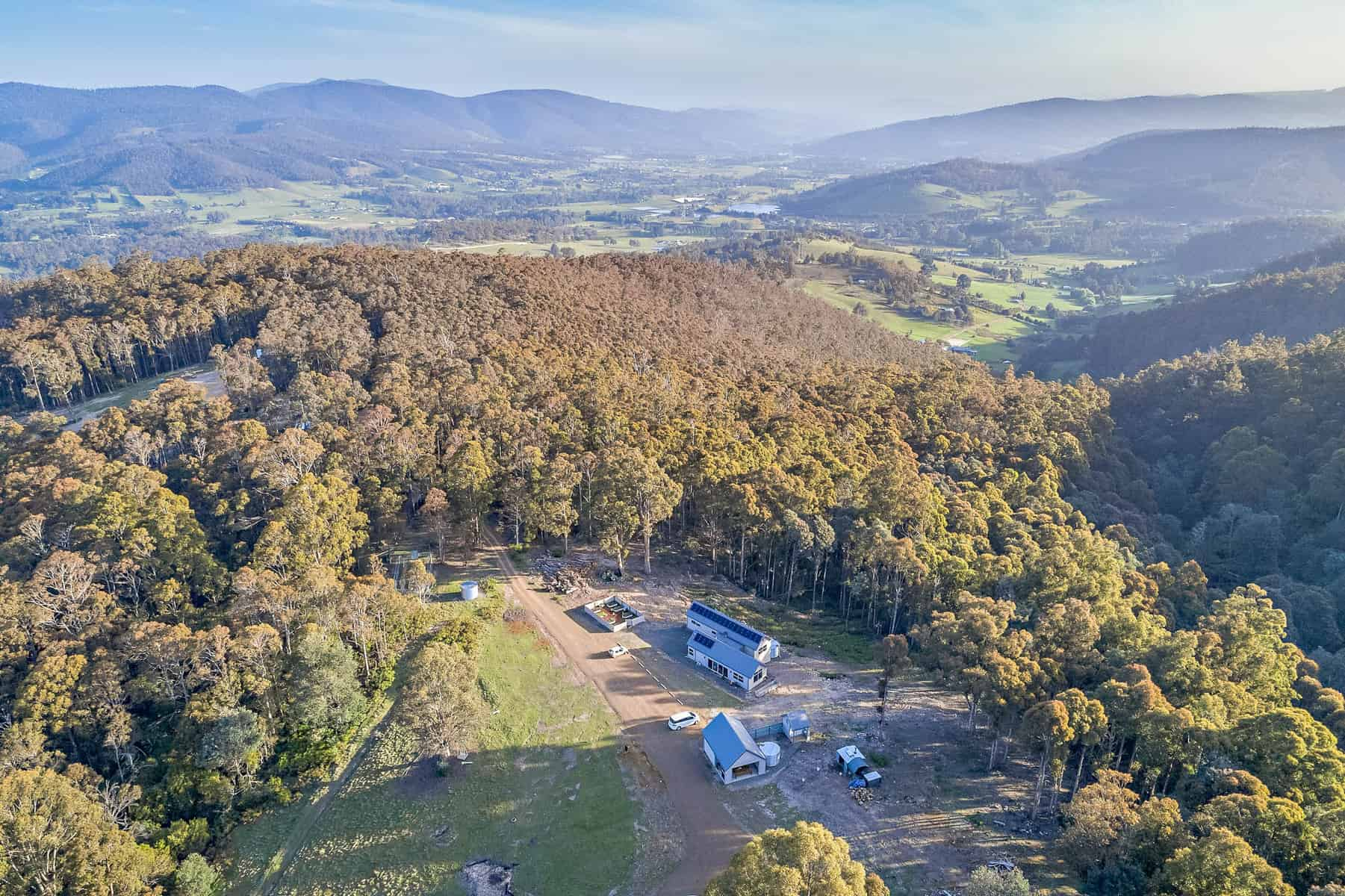
- Aerial photograph of Lucaston with Pilgrim Hill in the foreground

- Coordinates: 42.96°S 147.02°E
- Population: 354 (2016)
- Postcode(s): 7109
- Location: 13 km (8 mi) NW of Huonville
- LGA(s): Huon Valley Council
- Region: South-east
- State electorate(s): Franklin
- Federal division(s): Franklin
Localities around Lucaston:
Crabtree, Judbury	Crabtree	Crabtree
Judbury	Lucaston	Grove
Ranelagh, Judbury	Ranelagh	Huonville

Lucaston is a rural locality in the local government area (LGA) of Huon Valley in the South-east LGA region of Tasmania. The locality is about 13 kilometres (8.1 mi) north-west of the town of Huonville. The 2016 census recorded a population of 354 for the state suburb of Lucaston.

It is home to Lucaston Park Orchards, which grows raspberries, cherries, plums and apples, and to Pilgrim Hill, a Christian hostel.

Lucaston is also the starting point of the Targa Wrest Point car rally.

== History ==
The area was formerly known as Bakers Rivulet (or Creek) but late in the 19th century came to be called Lucaston after James Lucas, an early settler. Lucaston was gazetted as a locality in 1970.

== Geography ==
Mountain River, a tributary of the Huon River, forms part of the eastern boundary. Bakers Creek rises in the north-west and flows through to the river on the eastern boundary.

== Road infrastructure ==
Route C619 (Lollara Road) passes through the south-east corner. Route C645 (Lucaston Road) starts at an intersection with C619 and runs through to the north-east corner, where it exits.
