= HMS TB 4 =

Two ships of the British Royal Navy were named HMS TB 4.

- HMS TB 4 (1879) - a first-class, Lightning-type, torpedo boat, built by John I. Thornycroft & Company and launched in 1879. Sold for commercial use in 1905 and renamed Rocket. Scrapped 1920.
- HMS TB 4 (1906) - a Cricket-class destroyer built by J. Samuel White with the name Sandfly and launched on 30 October 1906. Reclassified as a torpedo boat and renamed TB 4 in December 1906. Ran aground on the way to be scrapped on 11 January 1921 and broken up in situ.
