= Sandfly Colliery Tramway =

Tramway in Tasmania

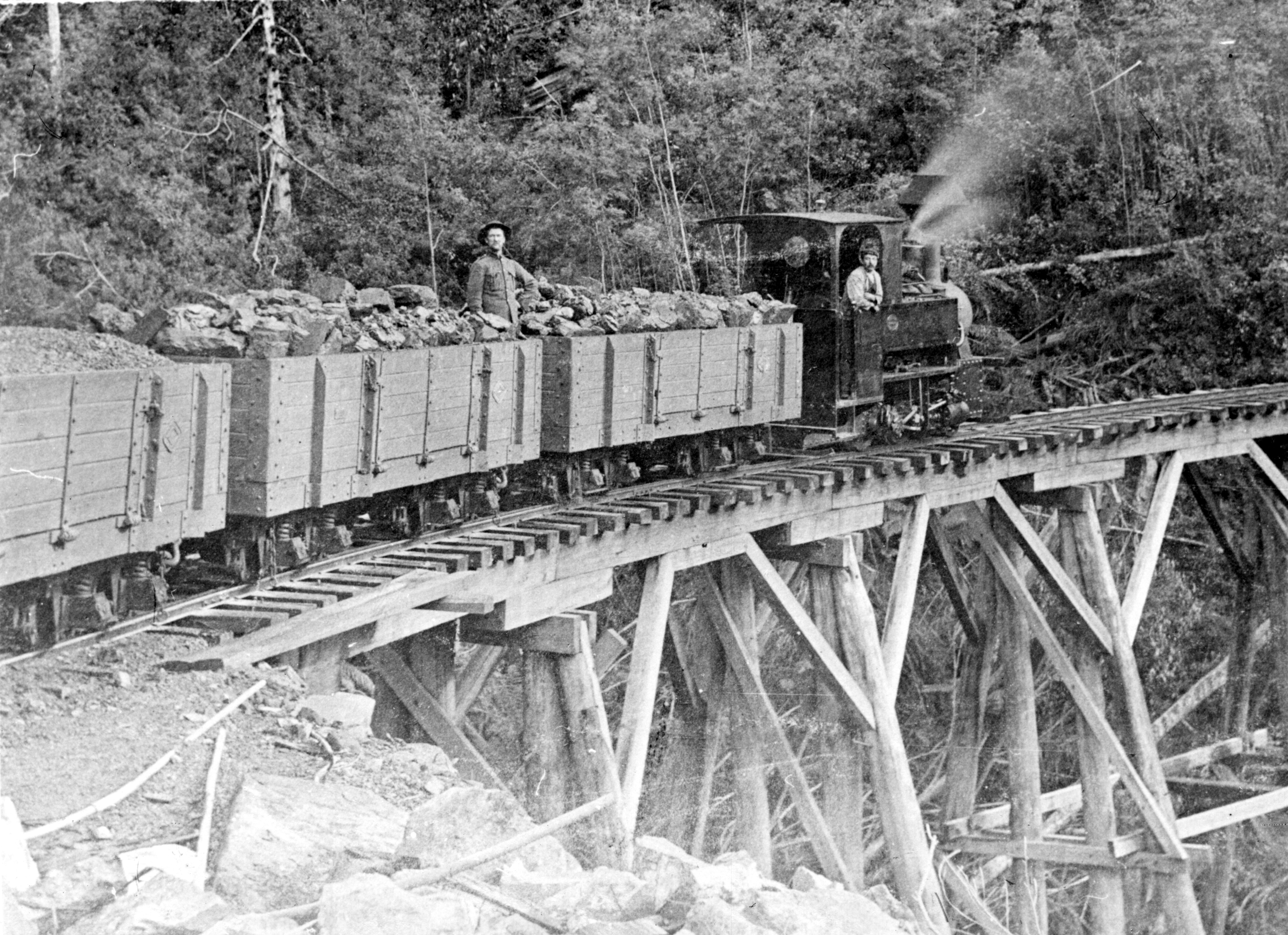
- Sandfly Colliery Tramway tailed by 2-4-0T Krauss locomotive

Overview
- Locale: Margate, Tasmania
- Transit type: Tramway
- Number of stations: 2

Operation
- Began operation: 1906
- Ended operation: 1922
- Operators: Sandfly Colliery Company; Tasmanian Wallsend Company; Government of Tasmania

Technical
- System length: 20 km (12 mi)
- Track gauge: 2 ft (610 mm)

The Sandfly Colliery Tramway (also known as the Kaoota Tramway) was a 20 km (12 mi), 2 ft (610 mm) narrow gauge tramway linking the Kaoota Mine to Margate, Tasmania. Constructed in 1905–06, the Tramway climbed 457 m (1,499 ft) above sea level and crossed ten bridges. After coal mining ceased the tramway was used to transport logs, fruit and passengers. The line was lifted and abandoned in 1922 after bushfires destroyed several bridges along the line. Currently, 6 km (3.7 mi) of the old track is used as cycling/walking tracks, while the remainder of the old line is on private property.

== History ==
The 2 ft (610 mm) narrow gauge steel tramway was built by the Sandfly Colliery Company in 1906. In 1904, 35 t (77,000 lb) of rail, one locomotive and 47 wagons were purchased from the contractors, Messrs. Henrickson and Knutson of Dunalley. The cost to the company was AU£1000. By 1916 the tramway was owned by the Tasmanian Wallsend Company, and when the coal seam became unproductive the company was bought out by the state government. Between 1917 and 1921 the line was leased to Kingborough Council for the purpose of transporting local freight before being dismantled in 1922 and shipped to the colliery at Catamaran.

== Route ==
The tramway left the Wharf at Margate and crossed the Channel Highway, Hickman's Road, Van Morrey Road, McGowans Road, Perrins Saddle, Thomson Creek and Pelverata Road. It reached a maximum gradient of 1:28 between Channel Highway and Hickmans Road.

== Rolling stock ==
Motive power was supplied by two Krauss tank locomotives.

Krauss 4526 (0-4-0T builder's number 4526 constructed 1902) was purchased from Messrs. Hendrickson and Knutson, arriving at the colliery in 1906. It was later sold to the Catamaran Colliery Company and then repaired with parts from Krauss 4080 in 1940.

The other locomotive (2-4-0T 5682, 1906) weighed 10 t (22,000 lb) and had 9 × 12 in (23 × 30 cm) cylinders and 24 in (61 cm) driving wheels. It was purchased new by the Colliery from Lohmann Brothers of Melbourne, agents for Krauss, and shipped to Margate, arriving in early 1907. Being new and heavier than 4526, it was regarded as the colliery's No. 1 locomotive. After 1914, it was the Colliery's sole locomotive. A bushfire in January 1920 left 5682 stranded and, as rebuilding a burned bridge was too expensive, the locomotive was left idle with a timber shed built around it for protection. In June 1922, the dismantling of the tramway from the colliery end reached the locomotive and it was removed to Margate, a temporary section of line having been built around the burnt bridge. The locomotive was sold to the Electrona Carbide Works for use on the Ida Bay line. It now resides at the Redwater Creek Steam Railway in Sheffield.
