= Mount Wellington (Tasmania) =

Mountain in Tasmania, Australia

- Kunanyi
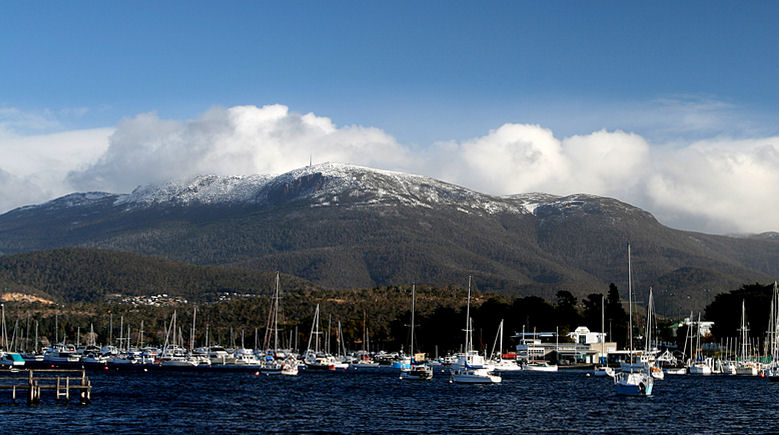
- Mount Wellington viewed from Lindisfarne Bay on the Eastern Shore of the River Derwent, with its seasonal snow cap visible

Highest point
- Elevation: 1,271 m (4,170 ft)
- Prominence: 693 m (2,274 ft)
- Isolation: 47.56 km (29.55 mi)
- Listing: 51th highest mountain of Tasmania
- Coordinates: 42°53′45.6″S 147°14′14.3″E

Geography
- Location within Tasmania
- Location: South East Tasmania, Australia
- Parent range: Wellington

Geology
- Mountain type: Dolerite

Climbing
- First ascent: numerous unknown pre-1798; George Bass (may have been a partial climb; 1798; European); Robert Brown 1804; European
- Easiest route: Hike, road

Mount Wellington, also known as Kunanyi (/kuːˈnɑːnjiː/) in palawa kani and gazetted as Kunanyi Mount Wellington, is a mountain in the south-east of Tasmania, Australia. It is the summit of the Wellington Range and is within Wellington Park reserve. Hobart, Tasmania's capital city, is located at the foot of the mountain.

The mountain rises 1,271 metres (4,170 ft) above sea level and is sometimes covered by snow, even in summer, and the lower slopes are thickly forested, but crisscrossed by many walking tracks and a few fire trails. There is also a sealed narrow road to the summit, about 22 kilometres (14 mi) from Hobart central business district. An enclosed lookout near the summit has views of the city below and to the east, the Derwent estuary, and also glimpses of the World Heritage Area nearly 100 kilometres (62 mi) west. From Hobart, the most distinctive feature of Mount Wellington is the cliff of dolerite columns known as the Organ Pipes.

== Geology ==
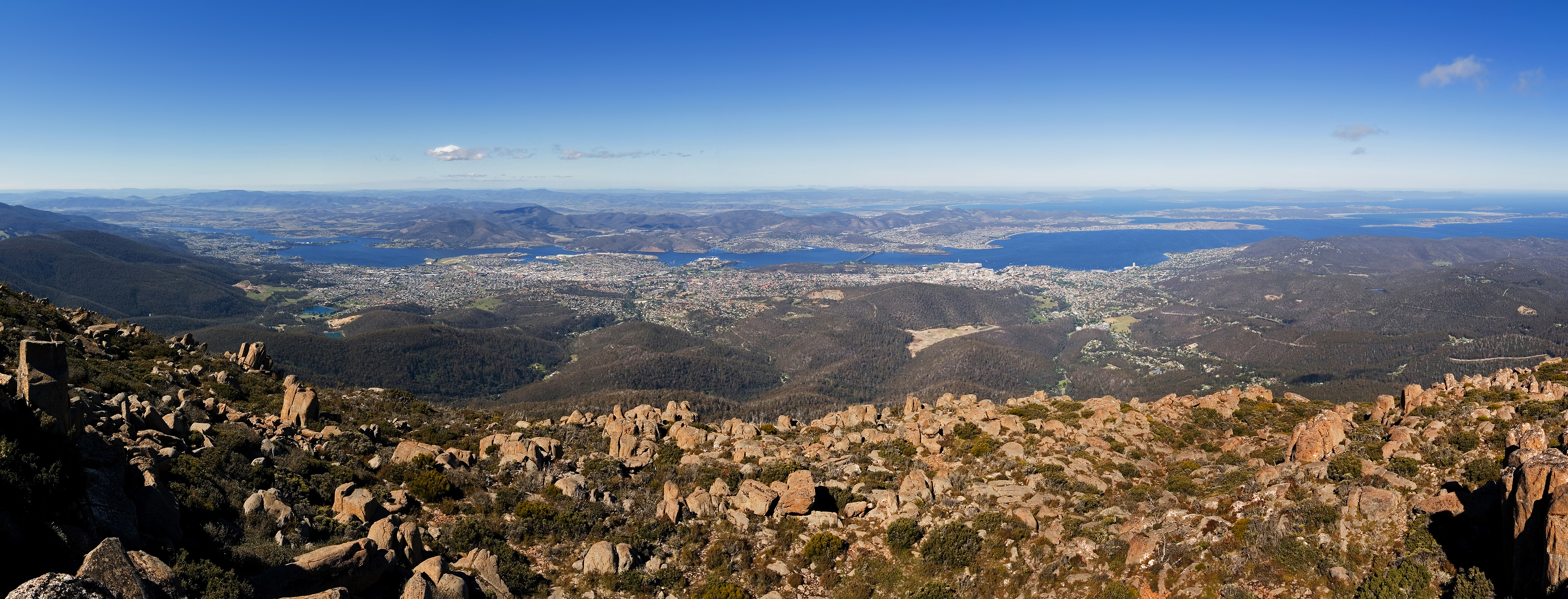
Greater Hobart area from Mount Wellington

The low-lying areas and foothills of Mount Wellington were formed by slow geological upsurge when the whole Hobart area was a low-lying cold shallow seabed. The upper reaches of the mountain were formed more violently, as a sill with a tabular mass of igneous rock that has been intruded laterally between layers of older rock pushing upwards by upsurges of molten rock as the Australian continental shelf tore away from Antarctica, and separated from Gondwana over 40 million years ago. A small volcanic vent was active about 300m south of the Pinnacle during the Tertiary period, between 50 and 10 million years ago.

== First Nations history ==
For thousands of years, the Palawa (Tasmanian Aboriginals) used the lower slopes and plateaus across the Wellington Range to hunt game (such as wallaby and possum) and gather seasonal plants. They maintained trails across the mountain for ease of travel between the Derwent Valley and coastal areas. French expeditions in the late 18th century witnessed extensive Palawa backburning in the foothills of the Wellington Rangee.

The Palawa that traversed the mountain included the Muwinina, Nuenonne, Melukerdee (of the South East nations), and Moomairremener and Pydairrerme (of the Oyster Bay/Paredarerme nations). These nations shared similar dialects and collectively referred the mountain as kunanyi, simply meaning "mountain". Other names recorded during the British colonisation of Tasmania which specify Mount Wellington by individual nations, include ungyhaletta (also recorded as unghbanyahletta), poorawetter, pooranetere, and pooranetteri.

=== Dual naming policy ===
In 2013, the Tasmanian government announced a dual naming policy and kunanyi / Mount Wellington was named as one of the inaugural dual named geographic features.

The name "Kunanyi" was formally capitalised in 2025, with palawa kani language coordinator Annie Reynolds stating the change reflected the evolution of written language use within the Palawa community.

== European history ==
The first recorded European in the area, Abel Tasman, probably did not see the mountain in 1642, as his ship was quite a distance out to sea as he sailed up the south east coast of the island – coming closer in near present-day North and Marion Bays.

No other Europeans visited Tasmania until the late eighteenth century, when several visited southern Tasmania (then referred to as Van Diemens Land), including Frenchman Marion du Fresne (1772), Englishmen Tobias Furneaux (1773), James Cook (1777) and William Bligh (1788 and 1792), and Frenchman Bruni d'Entrecasteaux (1792–93). In 1793 John Hayes arrived at the River Derwent, naming the mountain Skiddaw, after the mountain in the Lake District, although this name never gained popularity.

In 1798 Matthew Flinders and George Bass circumnavigated the island. While they were resting in the area Flinders named the river the River Derwent (the name Hayes had given only to the upper part of the river), Flinders referred to the mountain as "Table Mountain" (the name given to it by Bond and Bligh) for its similarity in appearance to Table Mountain in South Africa. d'Entrecasteaux's men were the first Europeans to sail up the river and chart it. Later Nicholas Baudin led another French expedition in 1802, and while sheltering in the River Derwent (which they referred to as "River du Nord" – the name d'Entrecasteaux had given to it) Baudin also referred to the mountain as "Montagne du Plateau" (also named by d'Entrecasteaux). However, the British first settled in the Hobart area in 1804, resulting in Flinders' name of "Table Mountain" becoming more popular. Table Mountain remained its common name until in 1832 it was decided to rename the mountain in honour of the Duke of Wellington who, with Gebhard Leberecht von Blücher defeated Napoleon at the Battle of Waterloo in present-day Belgium on 18 June 1815.

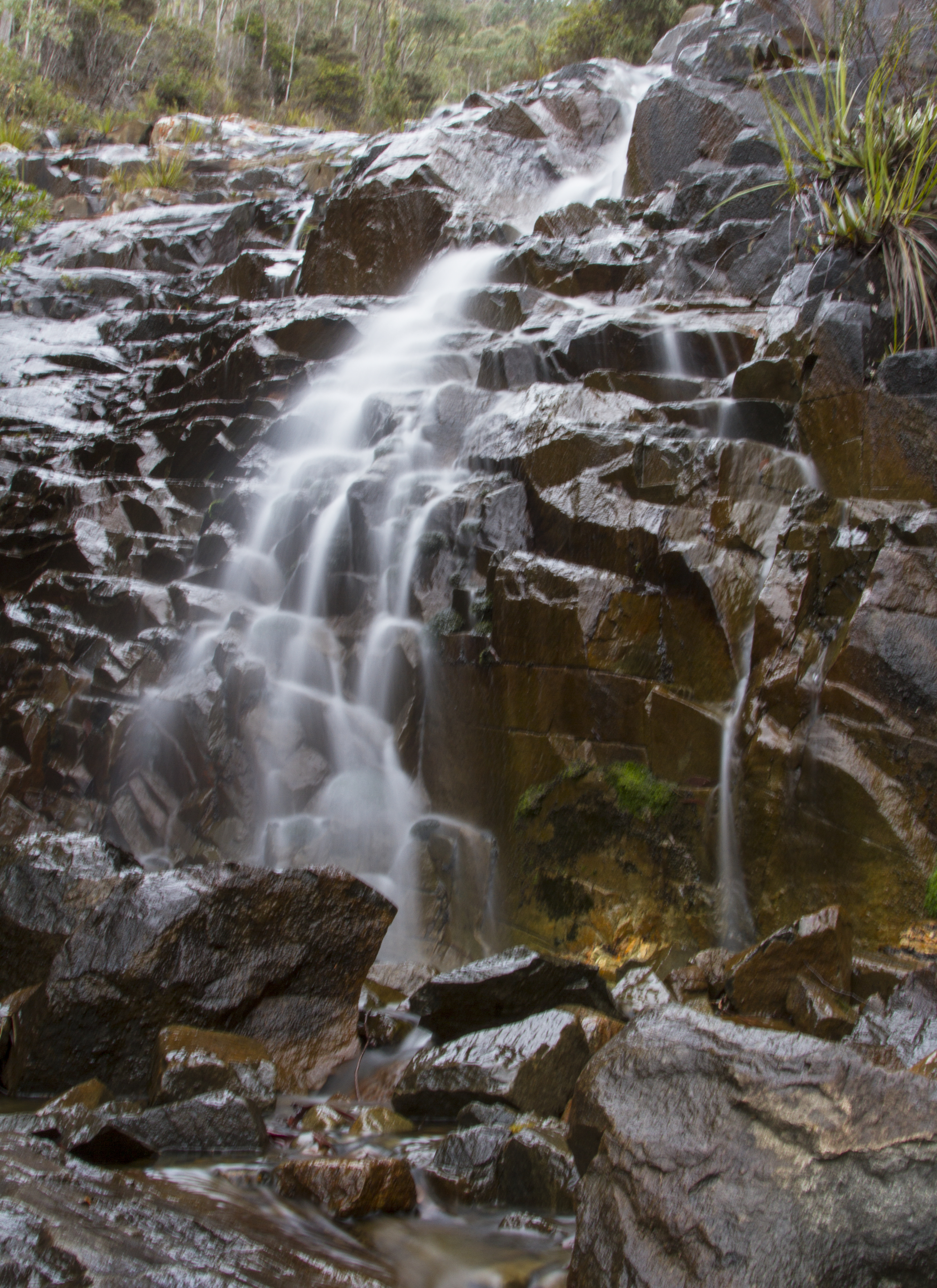
A small waterfall in New Town Rivulet near the head of the rivulet on the slopes of Mt Arthur, a sub-peak of Mt Wellington

In February 1836, Charles Darwin visited Hobart Town and climbed Mount Wellington. In his book The Voyage of the Beagle, Darwin described the mountain thus:

"... In many parts the Eucalypti grew to a great size, and composed a noble forest. In some of the dampest ravines, tree-ferns flourished in an extraordinary manner; I saw one which must have been at least twenty feet high to the base of the fronds, and was in girth exactly six feet. The fronds forming the most elegant parasols, produced a gloomy shade, like that of the first hour of the night. The summit of the mountain is broad and flat, and is composed of huge angular masses of naked greenstone. Its elevation is 3,100 feet [940 m] above the level of the sea. The day was splendidly clear, and we enjoyed a most extensive view; to the north, the country appeared a mass of wooded mountains, of about the same height with that on which we were standing, and with an equally tame outline: to the south the broken land and water, forming many intricate bays, was mapped with clearness before us. ..."

The first weather station was set up on Mount Wellington in 1895 by Clement Lindley Wragge.

Mount Wellington has played host to some notorious characters over time, especially the bushranger John "Rocky" Whelan, who murdered several travellers in the middle of the 19th century. The cave where he lived is known as "Rocky Whelan's Cave", and is an easy walk from the Springs.

=== Development ===
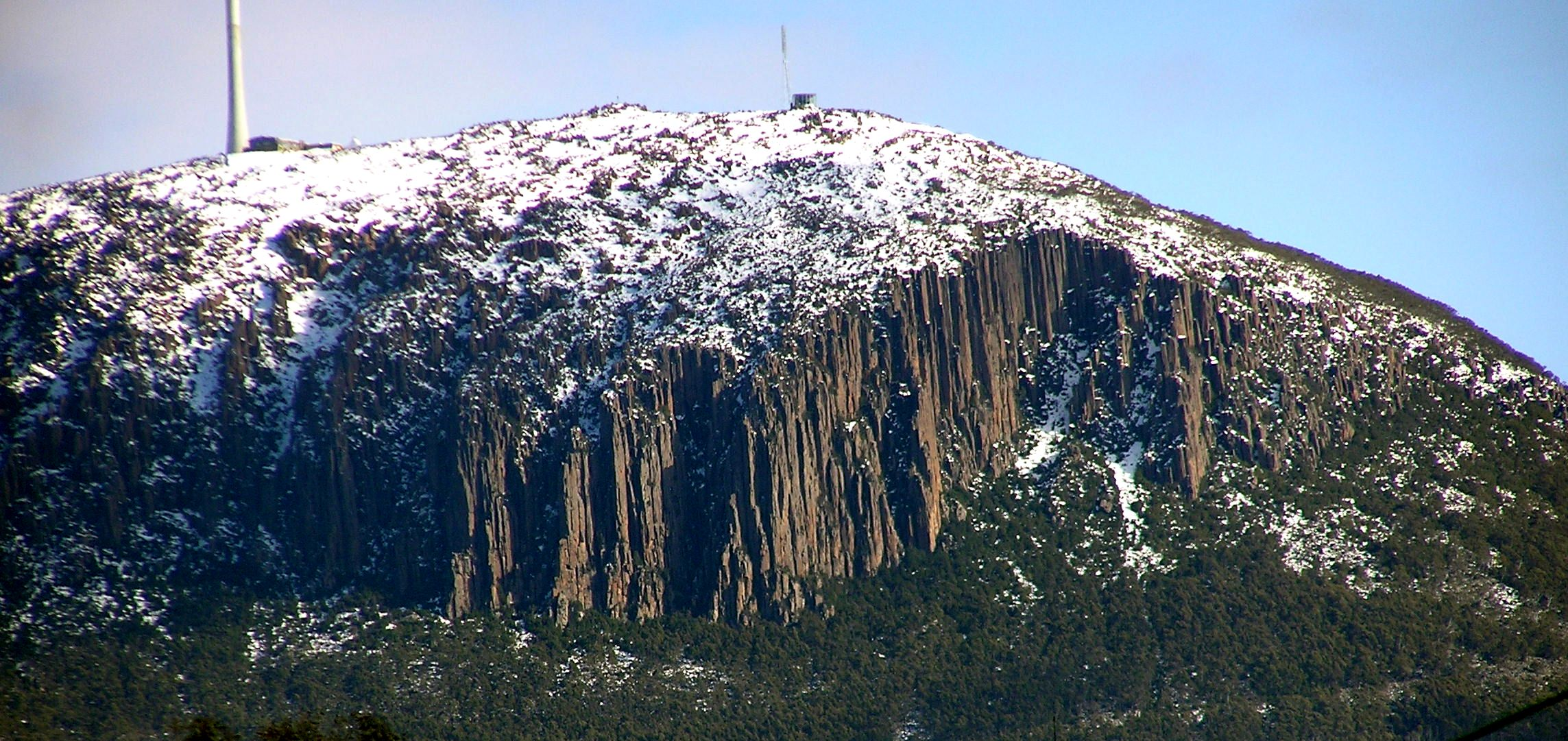
Organ Pipes at the top of the mountain

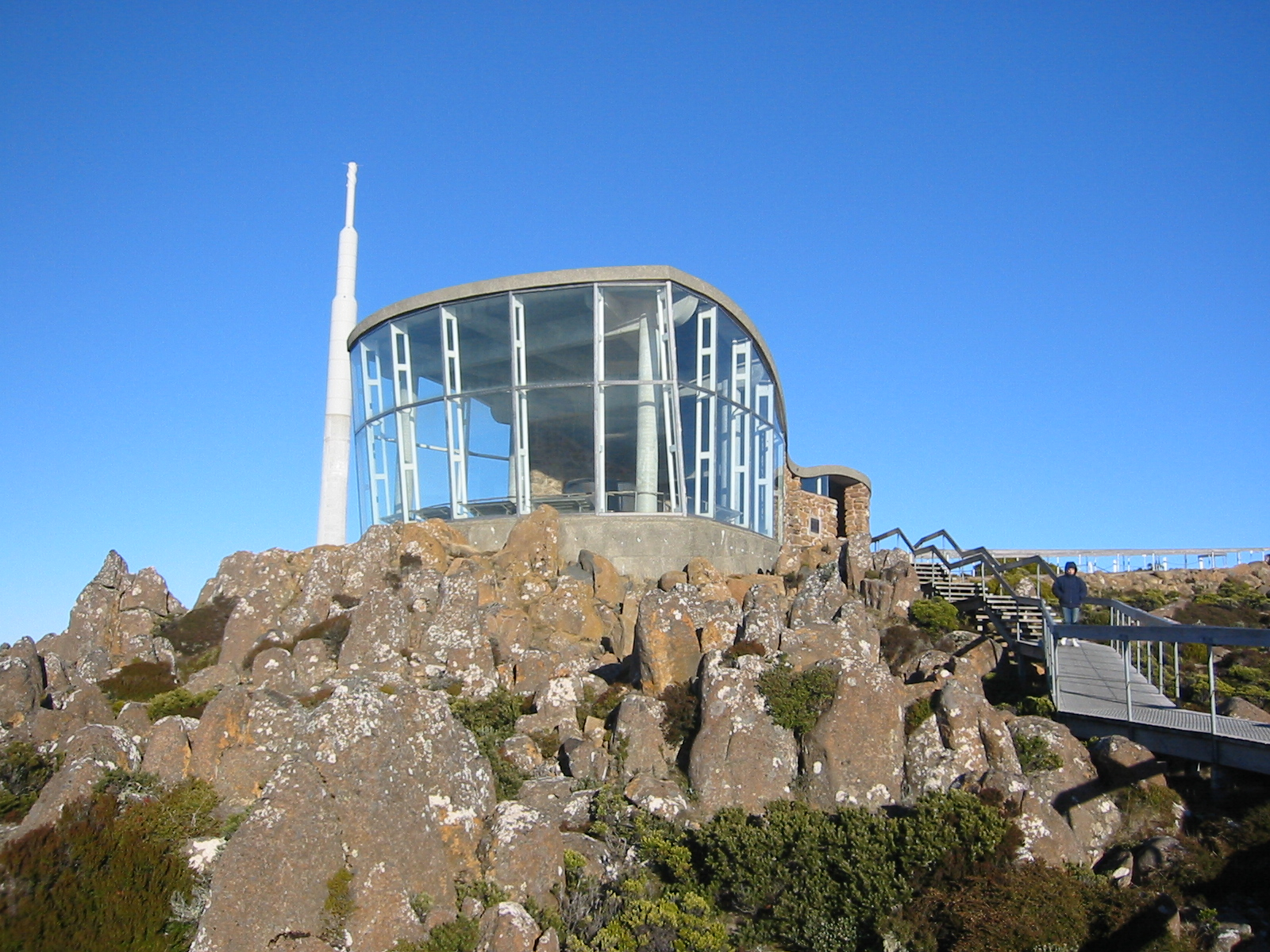
The lookout building near the summit, with the main radio and television transmitter in the background

Throughout the 19th and into the 20th centuries, the mountain was a popular day-resort for residents of Hobart. To that end, many excursion huts were built over the lower slopes of the mountain. However, none of these early huts survive; they were all destroyed during the bushfires of 1967. Modern huts are open to the public at the Springs, the Pinnacle, the Chalet – a picnic spot about halfway between the Springs and the Pinnacle – and elsewhere. Many of the more remote huts have suffered from vandalism, and some are virtually derelict.

The road to the summit was constructed in the early 1930s as a relief scheme for the unemployed, an idea initiated by Albert Ogilvie, the premier of Tasmania of the day. While the road is officially known as the Pinnacle Drive, it was for some time also widely known among residents of Hobart as "Ogilvie's Scar" because at the time it was constructed "the Mountain" was heavily logged and almost bare, and the road was an all-too-obvious scar across the already denuded mountain. Today the trees have grown again, but the "scar" most people see today is not actually the road but a line of large rocks with no trees 50–100 m above the road, provided as an easement for power lines. The road itself was opened on 23 January 1937, after two years of work, by Governor Sir Ernest Clark.

The road carries tourist traffic during the day, and sections may be closed at any time of the year due to snowfalls or icy conditions. Halfway up this road (at 720 metres) is a picnic area called "The Springs", near the site of a chalet/health spa that was destroyed by bushfire in 1967.

=== Broadcast tower ===
Mount Wellington was selected by many broadcasters as the site of radio and television transmitters as it provides line-of-sight transmission to a large area of Hobart and surrounding districts. Two steel lattice towers were erected in 1960 to deliver television services to Tasmania, these being a 104m tower known as the Post Master General tower (PMG tower) and another owned by WIN Corporation, the latter still present today. The PMG tower faced significant issues with snow and ice, and in 1982 a radome was added to protect the tower's antennas. Planning for a replacement tower began in the late 1980s, and in 1993 plans were finalised for a new 131m concrete and steel tower to withstand the mountain's harsh weather conditions.Between 1994 and 1995, the new concrete and steel Broadcast Australia tower (NTA tower) was constructed, leading to the PMG tower being demolished in January 1997. The NTA tower broadcasts all of Hobart's high-power FM radio stations, plus the digital TV services for ABC and SBS. It also has a small accommodation area at its base, with a kitchen and workshop area. The WIN tower broadcasts the digital TV services for Seven Network, Nine Tasmania, and 10 Tasmania. The site also contains some data links from local Hobart businesses. An amateur radio repeater is also installed on the mountain.

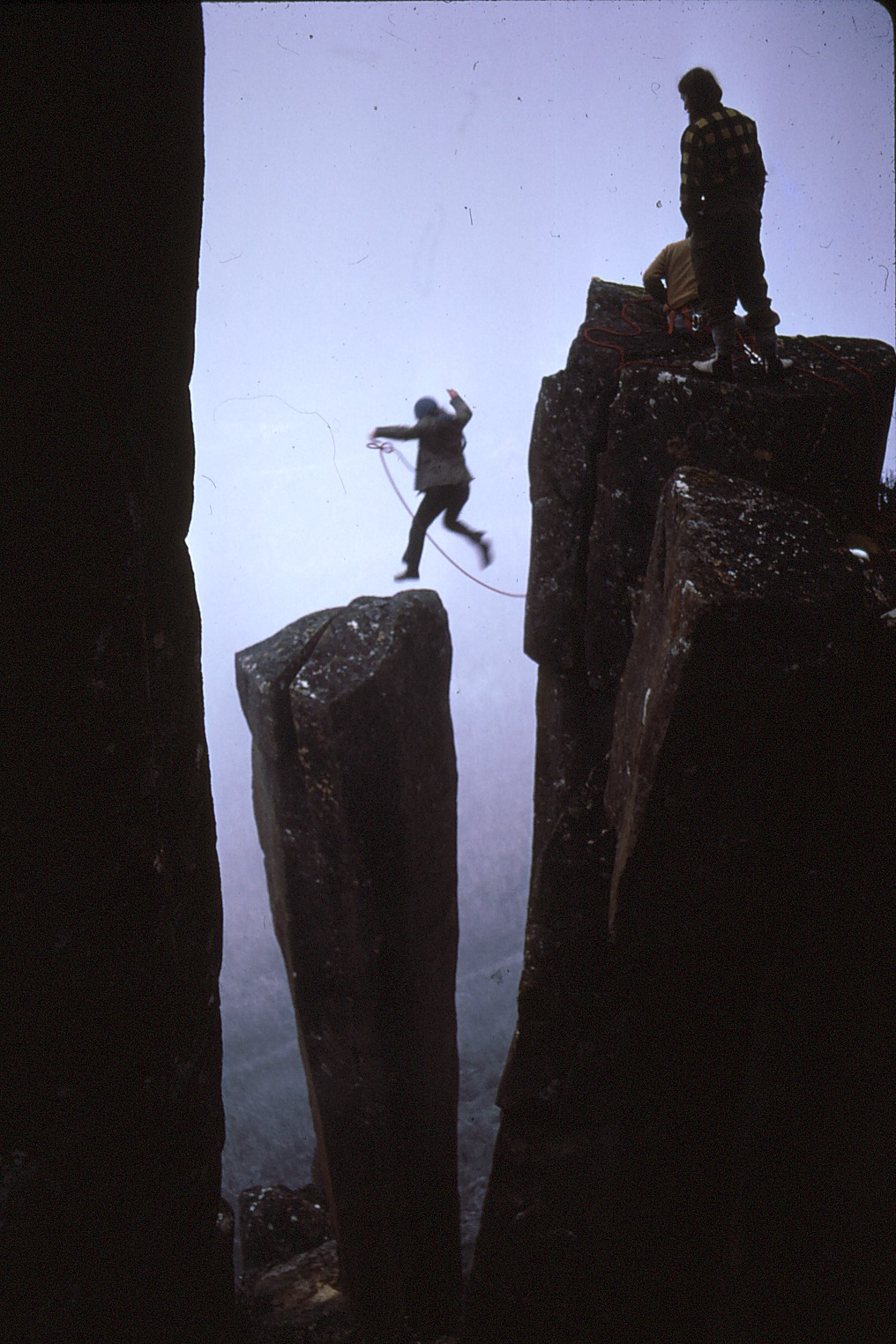
Lyle Closs jumps to Albert's Tomb, Organ Pipes on Mount Wellington, 1974

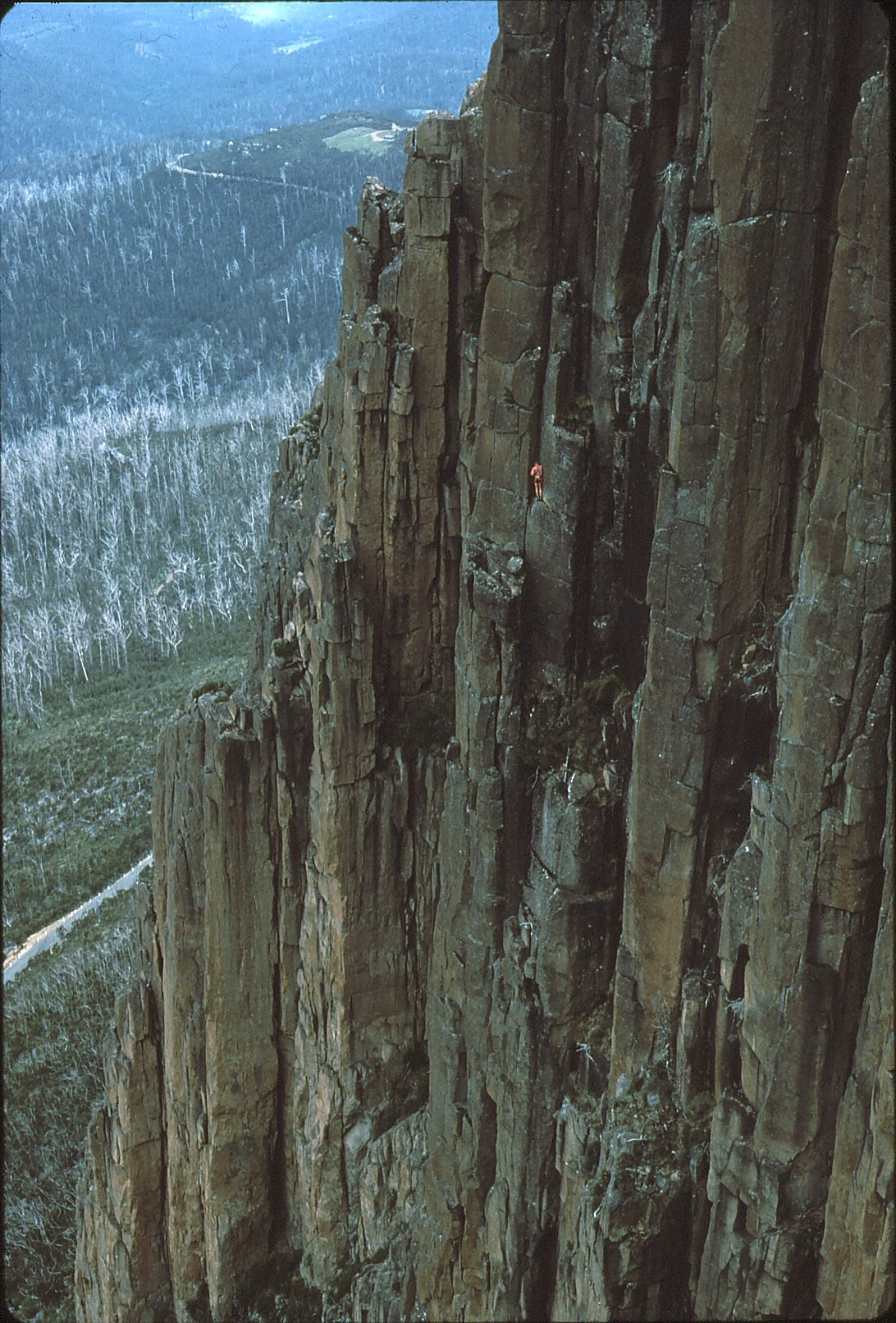
Bryan Kennedy solo climbing on Battlements, Organ Pipes on Mount Wellington, 1977

==== Cable car proposals ====
An aerial cable car has been proposed for the mountain on four occasions. On 27 July 2022, the Hobart City Council rejected the planning application on 21 areas of non-compliance. The council received over 16,500 public submissions on the proposal, of which 70% were against it. The Mount Wellington Cableway Company (MWCC) then appealed to the Tasmanian Administrative Appeals Tribunal, which in November 2022 upheld the decision of the Hobart City Council, rejecting the proposal on 18 of 26 contested grounds of refusal. The MWCC has not submitted an appeal to the decision.

== Climate ==
The summit of the mountain has a tundra climate (Köppen ET; Trewartha Ftkk) according to the standard Köppen–Geiger and Trewartha climate classification systems, or a maritime polar climate according to the Australian Bureau of Meteorology classification system. Using Otto Nordenskjöld's alternative polar isotherm, it could be considered to have a subpolar oceanic climate (Köppen Cfc) or a maritime sub(ant)arctic climate (Trewartha Eo), though extreme winds—having been recorded at sustained speeds of over 157 kilometres per hour (98 mph), with rare gusts of up to 200 kilometres per hour (120 mph)—prevent tree cover.

Its record low temperature is −9.1 °C (15.6 °F) recorded on 3 September 1993; low for Australia and Tasmania, though not especially so, lying outside the top 10 readings and top 7 locations for the state with its exposed, maritime aspect; its average yearly record low of around −6.4 °C (20.5 °F) places it within USDA hardiness zone 9a and Australian National Botanic Gardens hardiness zone 2. It is one of a handful of Australian locations to have never recorded a temperature above 30 °C (86 °F); its highest temperature being 29.8 °C (85.6 °F), most recently recorded on 31 January 2020, automatically putting it within American Horticultural Society heat zone 1; the average yearly record high is around 26.4 °C (79.5 °F).

The mountain significantly influences Hobart's weather, and intending visitors to the summit are advised to dress warmly against the often icy winds. Between May and October it frequently snows and the mountain is often snowcapped. Lighter snowfalls in late spring, summer and autumn are also common. A day on the summit can consist of clear sunny skies, then rain, snow, icy winds and clear again. Only in the months of January and February is it expected that fewer than 3 days will record an air frost; and its summit is one of the few sites in Australia to routinely experience sub-freezing daily maxima, with more than 1 in 10 days in both July and August expected to be ice days, and recorded the coldest daily highs in Tasmanian history at −5.0 °C (23.0 °F) on 5 September 1995 and 11 August 2005.

Very cold days may even occur at the height of summer, with a daily maximum of −2.7 °C (27.1 °F) having occurred on 18 February 1994, followed by a minimum of −7.4 °C (18.7 °F) the next morning. This was part of an extremely cold three-day spell that featured the following daily minima and maxima: low −4.9 °C (23.2 °F) / high −1.3 °C (29.7 °F) (17 February 1994), low −5.9 °C (21.4 °F) / high −2.7 °C (27.1 °F) (18 February 1994), low −7.4 °C (18.7 °F) / high −2.4 °C (27.7 °F) (19 February 1994).

Climate data for kunanyi (Mount Wellington Pinnacle, 1991–2020, extremes 1961–2024 (Note: Temperature was recorded from March 1961 to May 1972 excluding November 1970, then from December 1991 on. Precipitation was recorded from March 1961 to May 1972 and June 1990 to May 1992, then sporadically from 1994 on.)); 1,260 m AMSL; 42.90° S, 147.24° E
Month	Jan	Feb	Mar	Apr	May	Jun	Jul	Aug	Sep	Oct	Nov	Dec	Year
Record high °C (°F)	29.8 (85.6)	29.6 (85.3)	28.4 (83.1)	24.7 (76.5)	15.0 (59.0)	13.3 (55.9)	11.4 (52.5)	13.4 (56.1)	19.5 (67.1)	22.8 (73.0)	26.2 (79.2)	28.6 (83.5)	29.8 (85.6)
Mean maximum °C (°F)	24.8 (76.6)	23.4 (74.1)	20.5 (68.9)	16.0 (60.8)	12.2 (54.0)	9.2 (48.6)	7.4 (45.3)	9.1 (48.4)	12.1 (53.8)	17.5 (63.5)	20.1 (68.2)	22.1 (71.8)	26.8 (80.2)
Mean daily maximum °C (°F)	13.9 (57.0)	13.7 (56.7)	11.5 (52.7)	8.5 (47.3)	6.0 (42.8)	3.9 (39.0)	2.7 (36.9)	3.0 (37.4)	5.0 (41.0)	7.5 (45.5)	10.0 (50.0)	11.6 (52.9)	8.1 (46.6)
Daily mean °C (°F)	9.5 (49.1)	9.5 (49.1)	7.8 (46.0)	5.4 (41.7)	3.5 (38.3)	1.7 (35.1)	0.7 (33.3)	0.7 (33.3)	2.1 (35.8)	3.9 (39.0)	6.1 (43.0)	7.4 (45.3)	4.9 (40.8)
Mean daily minimum °C (°F)	5.0 (41.0)	5.2 (41.4)	4.1 (39.4)	2.3 (36.1)	0.9 (33.6)	−0.5 (31.1)	−1.4 (29.5)	−1.7 (28.9)	−0.9 (30.4)	0.2 (32.4)	2.1 (35.8)	3.1 (37.6)	1.5 (34.8)
Mean minimum °C (°F)	−0.9 (30.4)	−1.0 (30.2)	−1.7 (28.9)	−2.9 (26.8)	−3.8 (25.2)	−4.6 (23.7)	−5.1 (22.8)	−5.6 (21.9)	−5.3 (22.5)	−4.7 (23.5)	−3.4 (25.9)	−2.3 (27.9)	−6.3 (20.7)
Record low °C (°F)	−3.4 (25.9)	−7.4 (18.7)	−4.7 (23.5)	−6.5 (20.3)	−8.1 (17.4)	−7.5 (18.5)	−8.1 (17.4)	−7.8 (18.0)	−9.1 (15.6)	−7.7 (18.1)	−6.2 (20.8)	−4.4 (24.1)	−9.1 (15.6)
Average precipitation mm (inches)	98.5 (3.88)	78.4 (3.09)	84.2 (3.31)	92.9 (3.66)	74.1 (2.92)	97.8 (3.85)	61.7 (2.43)	83.7 (3.30)	80.8 (3.18)	84.4 (3.32)	93.6 (3.69)	91.8 (3.61)	1,021.9 (40.24)
Average precipitation days (≥ 0.2 mm)	17.6	16.9	19.4	19.4	20.3	18.6	20.6	18.7	19.7	20.3	18.3	19.8	229.6
Average relative humidity (%) (at 15:00)	74	75	79	83	87	90	93	89	88	83	80	76	83
Source: Bureau of Meteorology

== See also ==
- List of highest mountains of Tasmania
