= Sandfly, Tasmania =

Sandfly
- Town
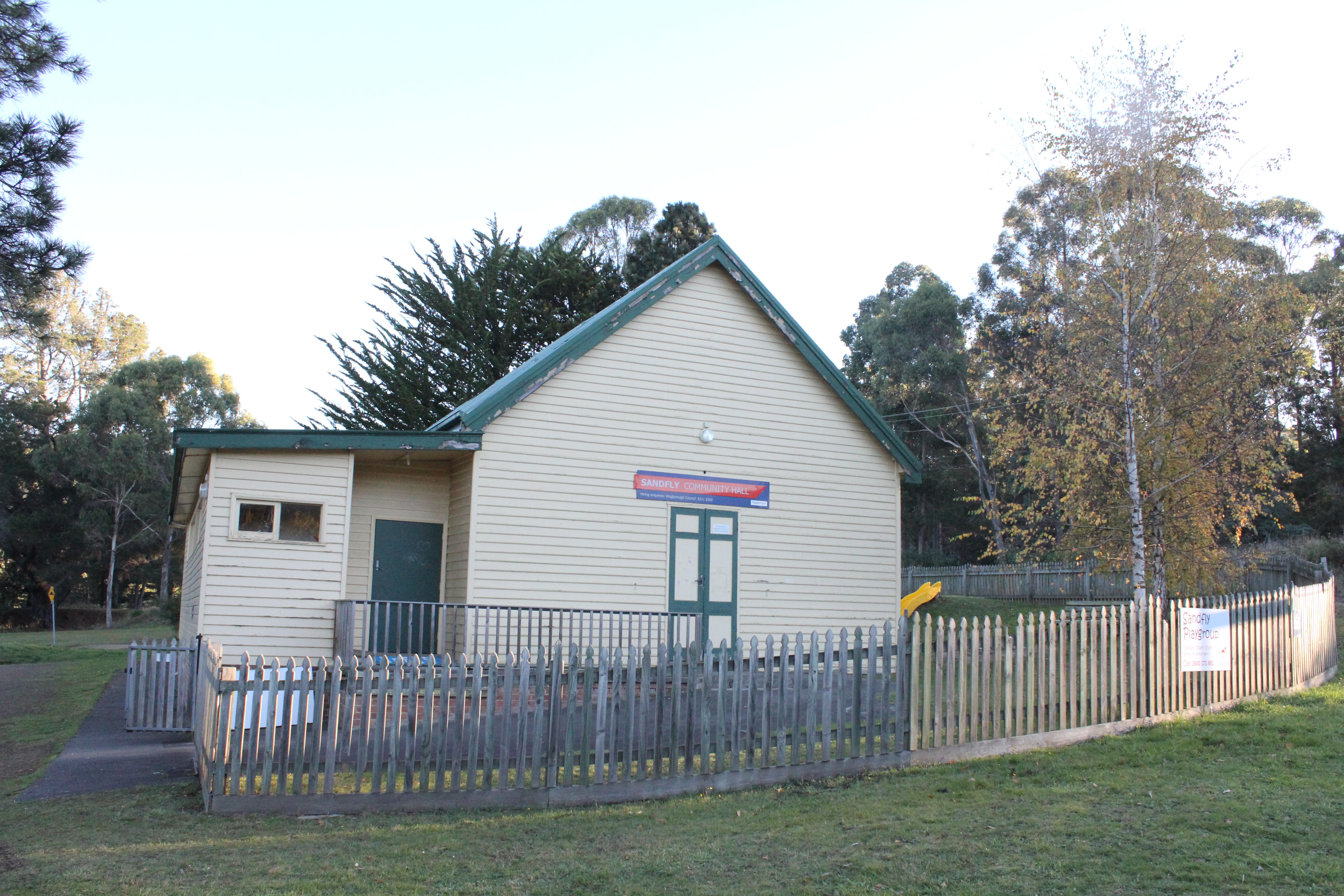
- Sandfly Hall, built 1903

- Coordinates: 42°59′45″S 147°11′24″E
- Country: Australia
- State: Tasmania
- LGA: Kingborough Council

Government
  - State electorates: Clark; Franklin
  - Federal divisions: Clark; Franklin

Population
  - Total: 336 (SAL 2021)
- Postcode: 7105

Sandfly is a suburb in the Kingborough Council local government area in Tasmania, Australia. A region of the Franklin Electorate, Sandfly is a historic area that sits between the suburbs of Longley, Lower Longley, Allens Rivulet, Margate, Leslie Vale and Kaoota. The population of Sandfly in 2011 was 156.

== Etymology ==
The origin of the name of the suburb is confused. It is named after Sandfly Rivulet, a tributary of the Huon River, discovered in 1837 and renamed Kellaways Creek in 1969, but the origin of the rivulets name is unknown. A number of local geographic features also have the name Sandfly; the area between the Rivulet through to Pelverata and Kaoota became the Sandfly Basin and the present Pelverata Falls were originally Sandfly Falls. The present Sandfly Road was Cross Road, and instead the now Pelverata Road was originally Sandfly Road.

== Sandfly basin ==
Usage of the term is now less common but Sandfly originally formed the center of the Sandfly basin, the region that encompasses the localities of Longley, Lower Longley, Kaoota, Allens Rivulet, Neika and Sandfly, roughly based on the area of the old Sandfly Rivulet. As late as 1905 it was legally enshrined as the Road District of Sandfly Basin, used as a school district in 1882. There also existed a parish of the Sandfly Basin for a short period.

== History ==
Sandfly was first settled in the 1850s. Its economy was built on the growing of small fruits, apples and pears like the nearby Huon Valley. Sandfly School was built in 1883 and burnt down in 1897 during bushfires. In 1898 a new school was built and used until 1966; it burnt down the next year during Black Tuesday.

Sandfly Methodist Church's foundation was laid in 1897 but delayed the same year due to the 1897 Tasmanian bushfires. Construction rebegun in 1899 and it opened on 13 August 1899. The church burnt down in Black Tuesday, the last service being on 5 February 1967. Longley Anglican Church and Longley Catholic Church both burnt down in the same fires and in 1969 a combined Methodist-Anglican Church (St Lukes of Sandfly) was built where the school had burnt down. It closed in 2008.

Sandfly Hall was built in 1903, with the foundation stone laid by Captain Evans MHA on 7 March and the entire hall built in just three weeks. An anteroom was added in 1934, opened by Ben Pearsall MHA in November.

Coal was discovered in Sandfly in 1903 by R L Slide and began mining it. This operation was brought up by the North West Bay Company, which later merged with the Sandfly Colliery Company who primarily owned mines at Kaoota, linked via a tramway from Kaoota through to Margate. This company had been founded in the 1870s by James Hurst, a wealthy landowner but the early mining operations were small scale. The Sandfly Coal Mining Company in 1902 began work on larger mines. The North West Bay Company and the Sandfly Coal Mining Company merged in 1904 and leased 100 acres to begin operations. In November 1906 the tramway was completed and production was increased, but the company went bankrupt in late 1907. The Tasmanian Wallsend Colliery Company acquired the Sandfly Colliery Company in 1908 and began mining again but after mining 16000 tons the coal ran out in 1910. The State Government purchased Sandfly Tramway in 1916 and began leasing it to Kingborough Council in 1917.

In 1917 a syndicate reopened the mines after a strike cut coal supply from the mainland, but it again stopped in 1919. Bushfires damaged the tramways in 1917 and 1920, and one of the bridges was destroyed in the 1920 fire. The Council continued to operate the service but stopped at the missing bridge, and the rest of the tramway past the burnt bridge were sold to the Catamaran Coal Company, pulled down and used to help build Ida Bay Railway. The Fogarty family began small scale mining again in 1937, which continued until 1971 when it closed for good.

Sandfly Recreation Ground was created originally by the Sandfly Sports and Trotting Club in 1921 when a temporary racecourse was constructed there. A Recreation Ground Committee was formed in 1923 and began improvements to the grounds. Paid for by a baby competition organised by the local schoolteacher, Sandfly Recreation Ground Pavilion was built in 1925 (now the Longley Cricket Club Rooms). The Sandfly War Memorial was added to the Sandfly Recreation Grounds after World War II, expanding the pavilion and adding memorial gates to the grounds.

== Landmarks ==
The local polling station for the Denison division of the Franklin electorate is located in Sandfly Hall, Sandfly Road, Sandfly. Sandfly Post Office opened on 1 April 1888 and closed in 1981.

The Longley Cricket Club, known as the Longley Bunyips, has Sandfly Oval, located on Sandfly Road, as its homeground. The defunct Anglican Church of St. Luke's is located in Sandfly; it remains under the care of the Anglican Parish of St Clement's, Kingston. The original Church of St Luke's, built in 1893, burnt down in the year 1931, and a second church was built to replace it, which was destroyed in the 1967 bush fires. The current church was built using the combined resources of the local Methodist, Anglican and Roman Catholic congregations, in 1969.

At the very corner of the Longley-Sandfly-Huon Highway intersection, the historic Sandfly Store still stands, although the original building is no longer in use and a new cinder block store has been constructed next door. Sandfly's major road is Sandfly Road, which begins at the Sandfly-Longley Junction and runs through Sandfly, in to Margate, acting as the major route between Longley, Sandfly, Allens Rivulet and Margate.

== See also ==
- List of localities in Tasmania
