= Pelverata =

Pelverata Tasmania
- Coordinates: 43°02′16.9″S 147°07′01.9″E
- Population: 206 (2016 census)
- Postcode(s): 7150
- Location: 22 km (14 mi) SW of Kingston
- LGA(s): Huon Valley Council, Kingborough Council
- Region: South-east, Hobart
- State electorate(s): Franklin, Clark
- Federal division(s): Franklin, Clark
Suburbs around Pelverata:
Grove	Kaoota, Grove	Kaoota
Huonville	Pelverata	Snug, Kaoota
Upper Woodstock	Upper Woodstock, Cygnet	Snug

Pelverata is a rural locality in the local government areas (LGA) of Huon Valley and Kingborough in the South-east and Hobart LGA regions of Tasmania. The locality is about 22 kilometres (14 mi) south-west of the town of Kingston. The 2016 census recorded a population of 206 for the state suburb of Pelverata. It is a town in Tasmania, Australia, to the east of Huonville. It is mainly in the Huon Valley Council area, with about 4% in the Kingborough Council LGA.

== History ==
Pelverata was gazetted as a locality in 1968. Previously known as Upper Woodstock, the name was changed in 1912. The name Pelverata is a Tasmanian Aboriginal word for "ear".

== Geography ==
Most of the boundaries are survey lines.

== Road infrastructure ==
Route B621 (Pelverata Road) runs through from south-west to north-east.

== Attractions ==
- Pelverata Falls
