= Tasmanian Government Railways M class (1912) =

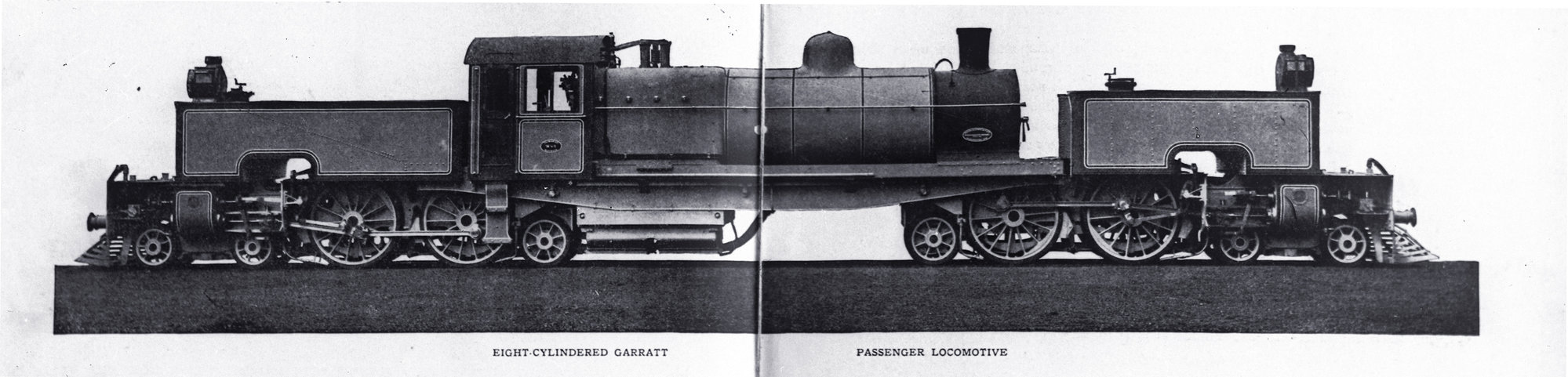
Type and origin
- Power type: Steam
- Builder: Beyer, Peacock & Company
- Serial number: 5523, 5524
- Build date: 1912
- Total produced: 2
Specifications
- Configuration
  - Whyte: 4-4-2+2-4-4
- Gauge: 1,067 mm (3 ft 6 in)
- Driver dia.: 5 ft 0 in (1,524 mm)
- Total weight: 95 long tons 0 cwt (212,800 lb or 96.5 t)
- Fuel type: Coal
- Boiler pressure: 160 lbf/in^{2} (1.10 MPa)
- Cylinder size: 12 in × 20 in (305 mm × 508 mm)
Performance figures
- Tractive effort: 24,576 lbf (109.32 kN)
Career
- Operators: Tasmanian Government Railways
- Numbers: M1-M2
- Disposition: Both withdrawn and scrapped

The Tasmanian Government Railways M class was a class of 2 4-4-2+2-4-4 Garratt locomotives operated by the Tasmanian Government Railways.

== History ==
In 1912, the Tasmanian Government Railways took delivery of two 4-4-2+2-4-4 Garratt locomotives from Beyer, Peacock & Company, Manchester. They were designed to haul express passenger trains between Launceston and Hobart. With the introduction of the R class, M1 was withdrawn in 1923 and sold to the Mount Lyell Mining & Railway Company while M2 was withdrawn in 1931 and scrapped in 1953.

== Namesake ==
The M class designation was reused by the M class that was introduced in 1952.
