= Wellington Park =

Protected area near Hobart, Tasmania

- IUCN category II (national park)
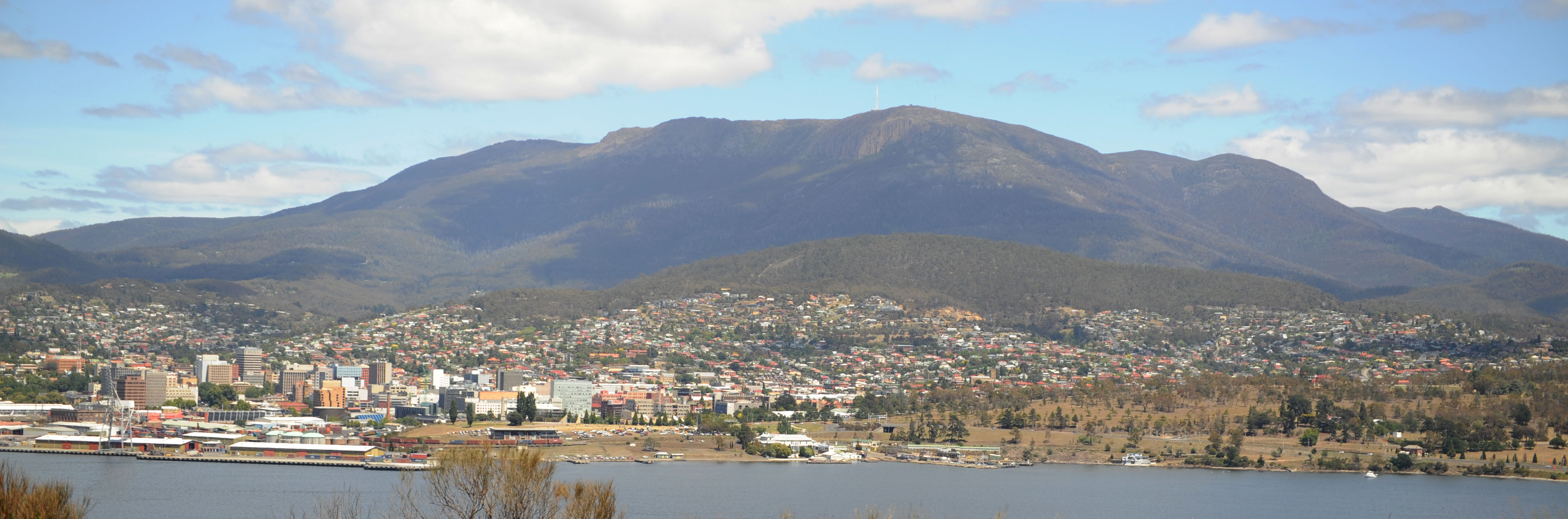
- Hobart with Mount Wellington in the background

- Location within Tasmania
- Nearest city: Hobart
- Coordinates: 42.89°S 147.16°E
- Area: 182.5
- Established: 1 November 1993
- Visitors: 280,491
- Operator: Wellington Park Management Trust
- Website: www.wellingtonpark.org.au

Wellington Park is a protected area which encompasses kunanyi / Mount Wellington and surrounds near Hobart, Tasmania. There are numerous hiking and mountain bike tracks within the park of varying difficulty.

== Protection ==
Although it carries the same status as a national park (IUCN protected area category II), it cannot technically be reserved as a national park because it contains private land.

== Management ==
Wellington Park is administered by the Wellington Park Management Trust, established in 1993, whose members include: Hobart and Glenorchy City Councils, Tasmania Parks and Wildlife Service, Department of Natural Resources and Environment, TasWater, and Tourism Tasmania. The Wellington Park Management Trust is outlined in the Wellington Park Act 1993.

== Gallery ==
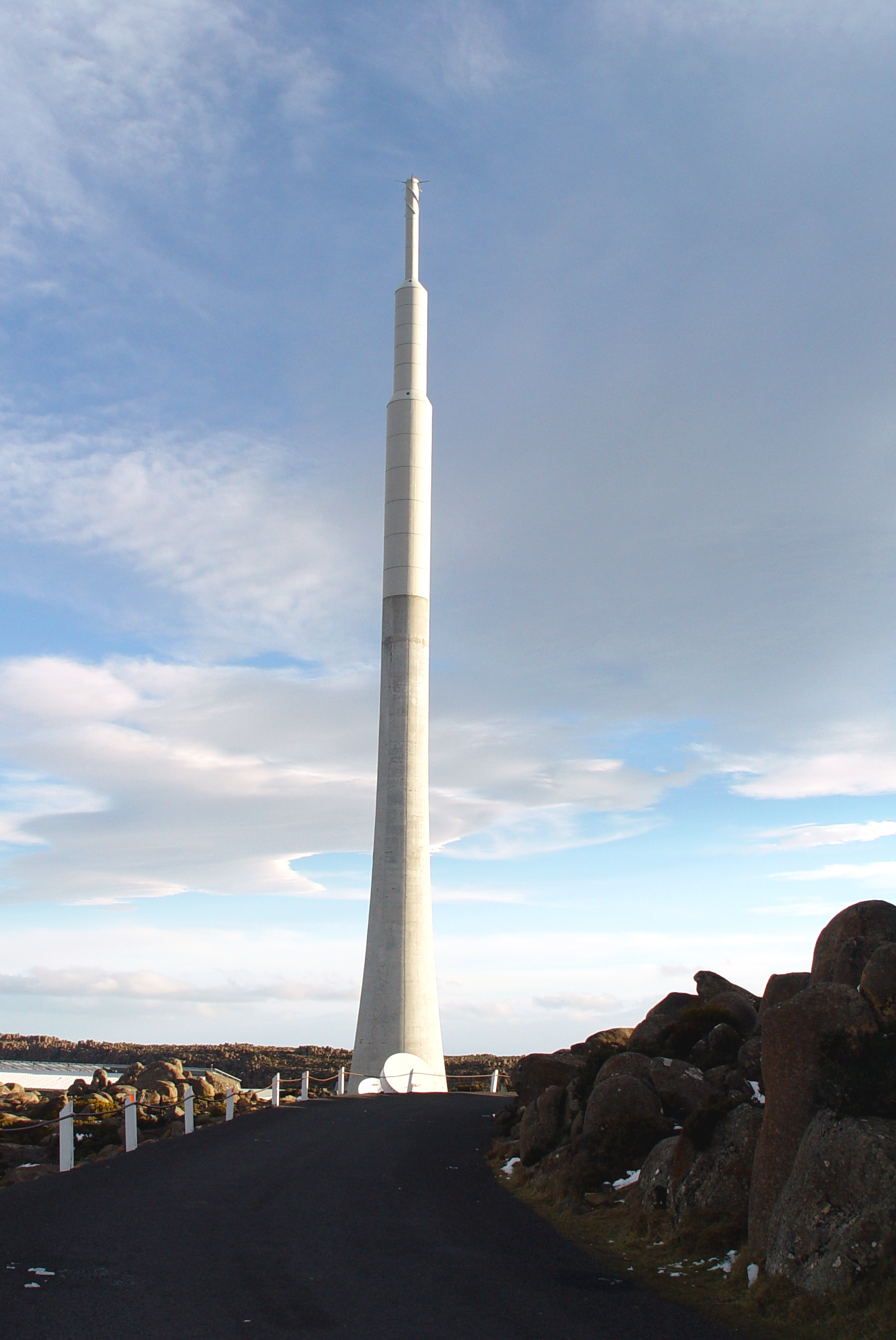
Australia Tower on the top of Mount Wellington

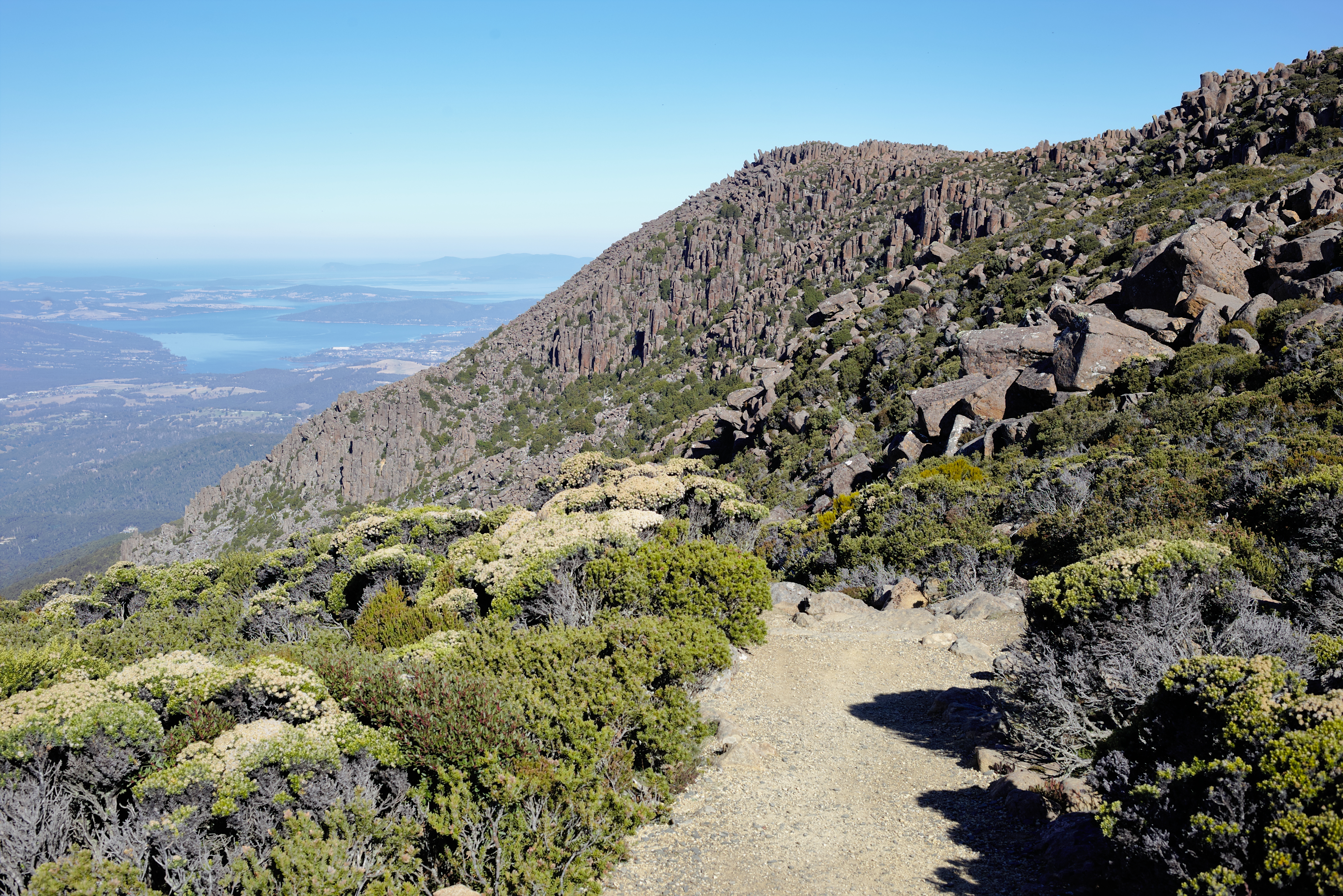
Mount Wellington hiking track and Organ Pipes

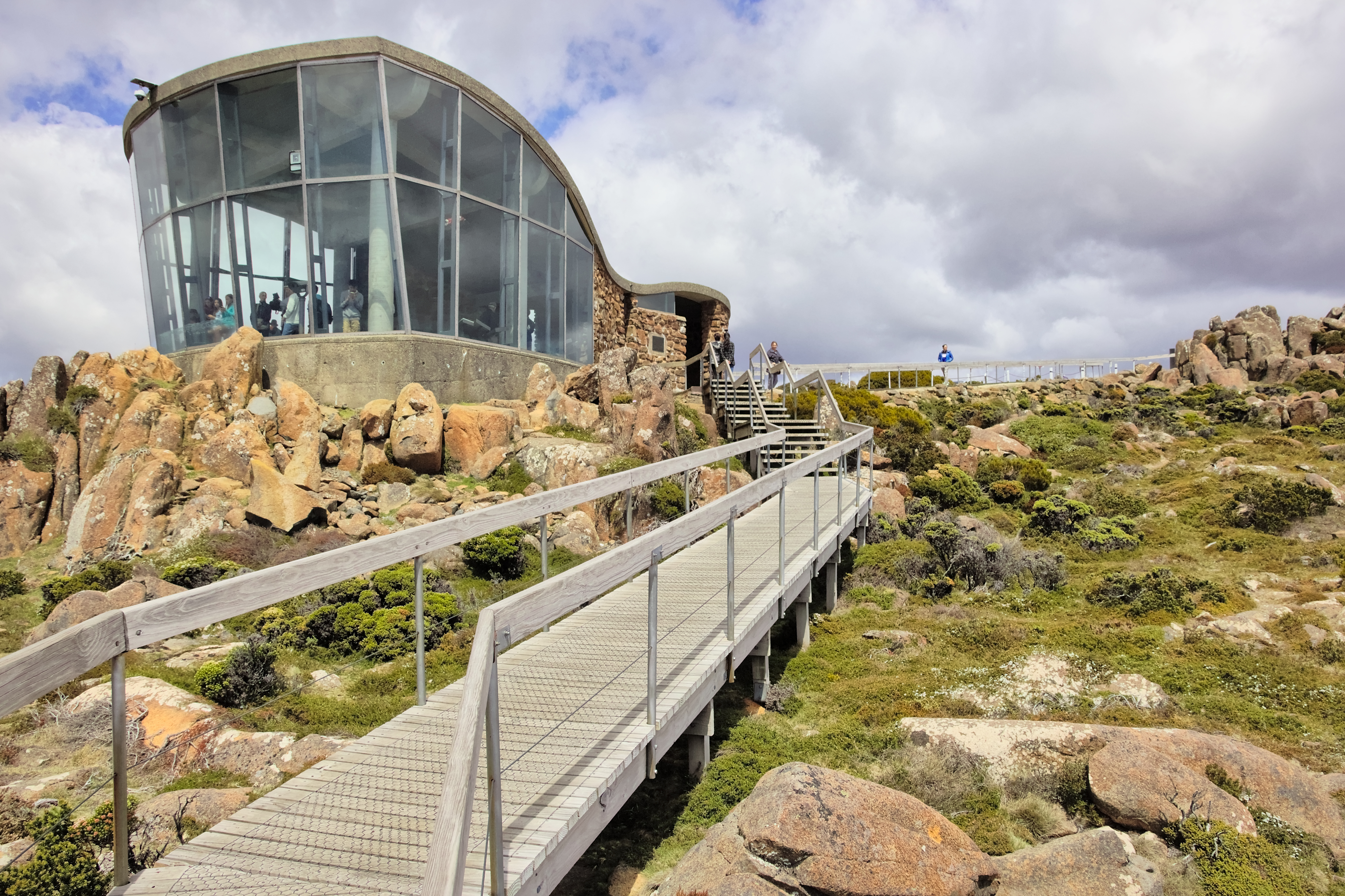
Mount Wellington lookout and boardwalk

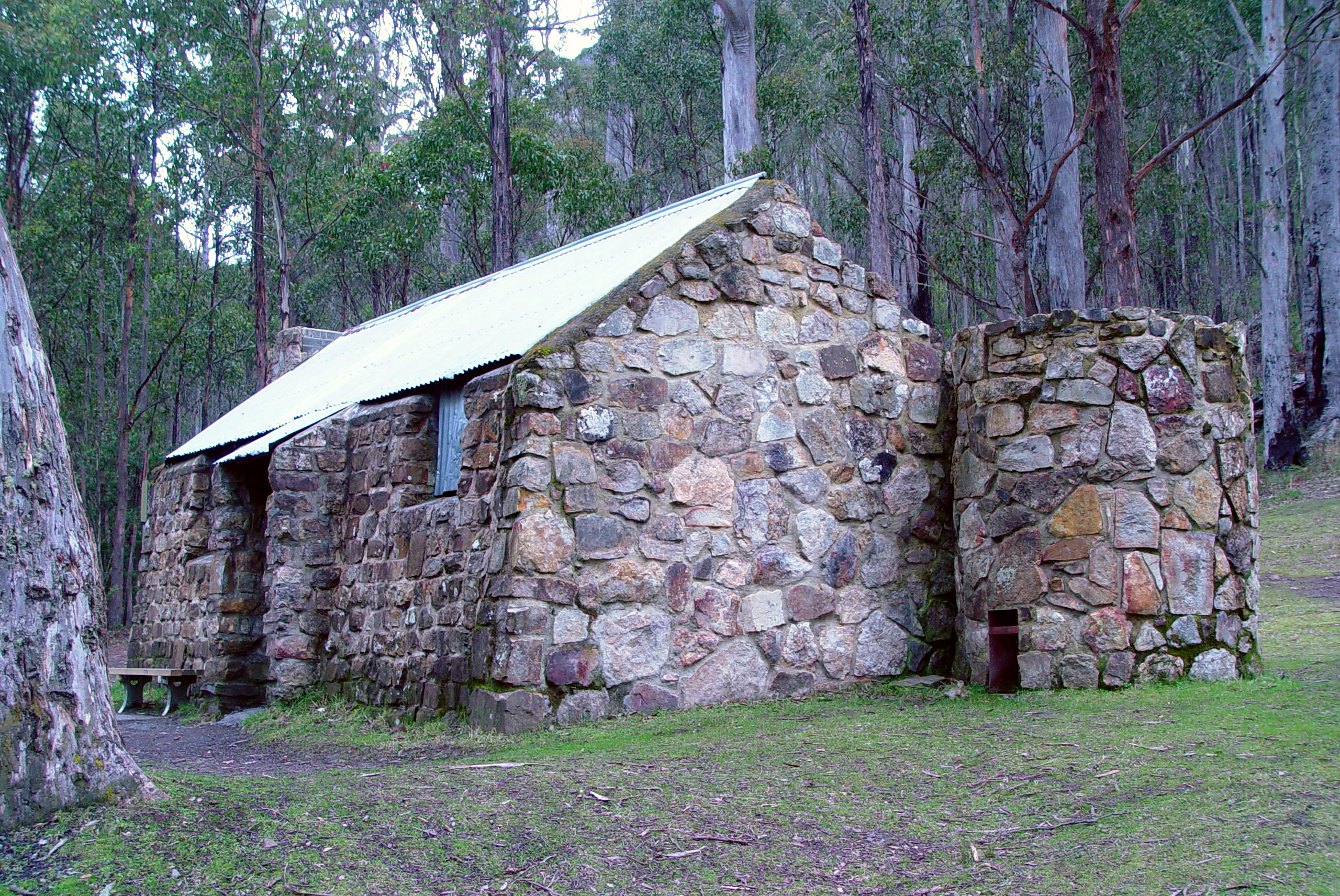
One of the huts on the slopes of Mount Wellington

== See also ==
- Protected areas of Tasmania
- Wellington Range
