= Tasmanian Government Railways M class (1952) =

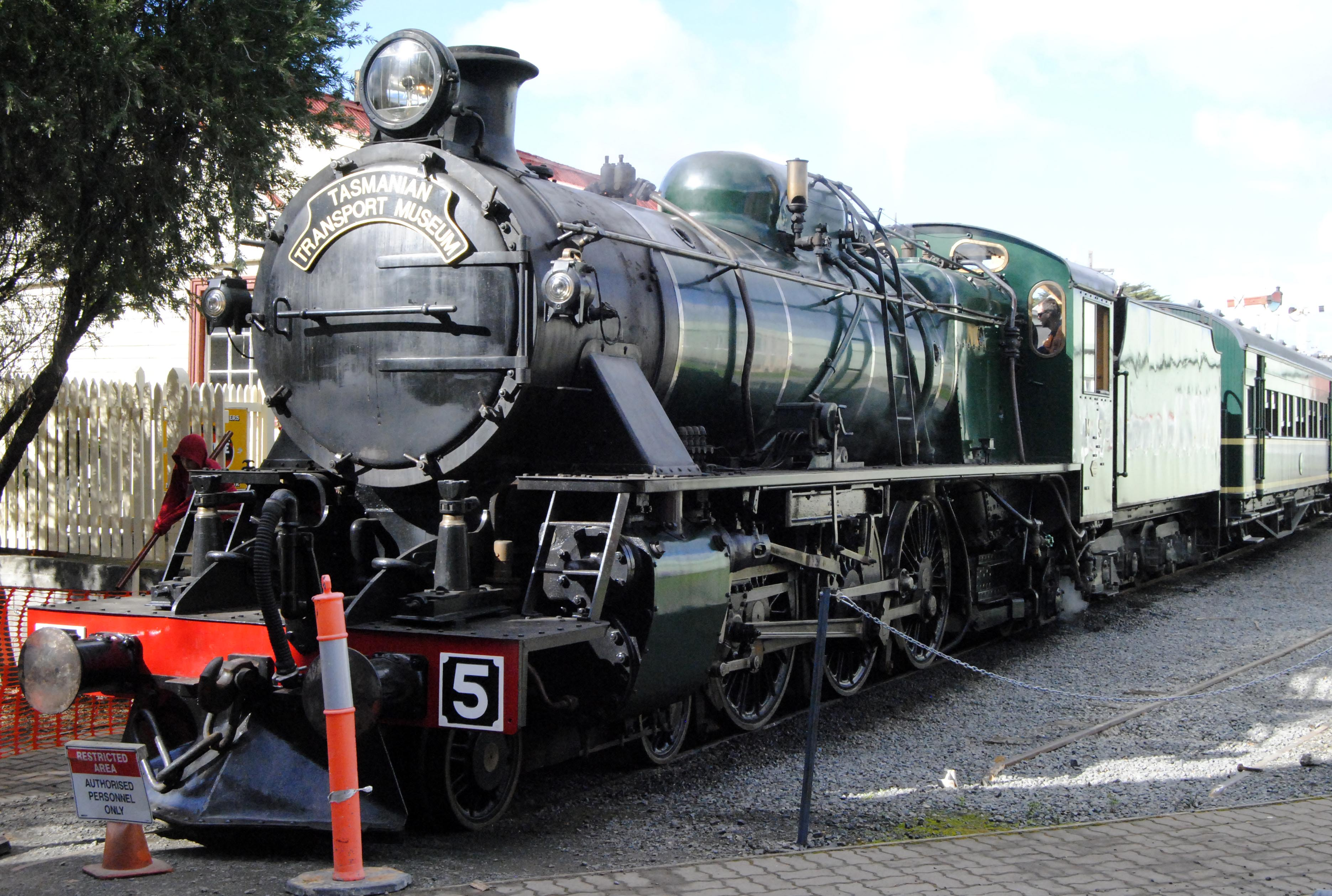
- M5 at the Tasmanian Transport Museum
Type and origin
- Power type: Steam
- Builder: Robert Stephenson & Hawthorns
- Serial number: 7421-7430
- Build date: 1951
- Total produced: 10
- Rebuilder: Tasmanian Government Railways, Inveresk
- Rebuild date: 1957
- Number rebuilt: 4 (MA class)
Specifications
- Configuration
  - Whyte: 4-6-2
- Gauge: 1,067 mm (3 ft 6 in)
- Leading dia.: 2 ft 2.5 in (0.673 m)
- Driver dia.: M: 4 ft 7 in (1,397 mm); MA: M: 4 ft 0 in (1,219 mm)
- Trailing dia.: 2 ft 4 1/2 in (0.724 m)
- Length: 59 ft 2 3/4 in (18.053 m)
- Axle load: Loco: 10.20 long tons (10.4 t); Tender: 10.60 long tons (10.8 t)
- Adhesive weight: 37.25 long tons (37.8 t)
- Loco weight: 54.20 long tons (55.1 t)
- Tender weight: 42.40 long tons (43.1 t)
- Fuel type: Coal
- Fuel capacity: 6 long tons (6.1 t)
- Water cap.: 4,000 imp gal (18,184.4 L)
- Firebox
  - Grate area: 23.1 sq ft (2.146 m^{2})
- Boiler pressure: 180 lbf/in^{2} (1.24 MPa)
- Heating surface
  - Firebox: 371 sq ft (34.5 m^{2})
  - Tubes: 601 sq ft (55.8 m^{2})
  - Flues: 371 sq ft (34.5 m^{2})
- Superheater
  - Type: 18 element
  - Heating area: 371 sq ft (34.5 m^{2})
- Cylinders: 2 outside
- Cylinder size: 16 in × 24 in (406 mm × 610 mm)
Performance figures
- Tractive effort: M: 17,090 lbf (76.02 kN); MA: 19,600 lbf (87.19 kN)
- Factor of adh.: 3.44
Career
- Operators: Tasmanian Government Railways
- Numbers: M1-M10
- Withdrawn: 1960-1975
- Disposition: All preserved

The Tasmanian Government Railways M class is a class of 4-6-2 steam locomotives operated by the Tasmanian Government Railways.

== History ==
On 12 March 1952, the Tasmanian Government Railways (TGR) took delivery of ten M class branch line locomotives from Robert Stephenson & Hawthorns, Newcastle-upon-Tyne. The locomotives were similar to the Indian Railways YB class. The ten locomotives arrived in March 1952.

They were allocated for operation on the North-Eastern and Western lines, as well as for services based in Hobart. However, as the TGR had already commenced dieselisation with the X class, some lines intended for M class operation had already been converted. Consequently, in 1957, four were fitted with smaller driving wheels recovered from withdrawn Australian Standard Garratts to enable them to operate heavier trains over the steeply graded North-Eastern line.

As they fell due for overhaul, they were withdrawn from 1960, with the last removed from traffic in 1975.

=== Preservation ===
All members of the class have been preserved; four have seen further use on heritage trains.

Original number	Builder's number	Final number	Preservation
M1	7421	MA2	Don River Railway, Devonport
M2	7422	MA4	Don River Railway, Devonport
M3	7423	M3	Don River Railway, Devonport
M4	7424	M4	Don River Railway, Devonport
M5	7425	M5	Tasmanian Transport Museum, Glenorchy
M6	7426	MA3	Public park, Margate
M7	7427	M1	Derwent Valley Railway
M8	7428	MA1	Derwent Valley Railway
M9	7429	M6	Bellarine Railway, Queenscliff, Victoria
M10	7430	M2	Tanfield Railway, England

== Namesake ==
The M class designation was previously used by the M class, the last of which was withdrawn in 1931.
