= Wellington Range =

Mountain range in Tasmania, Australia

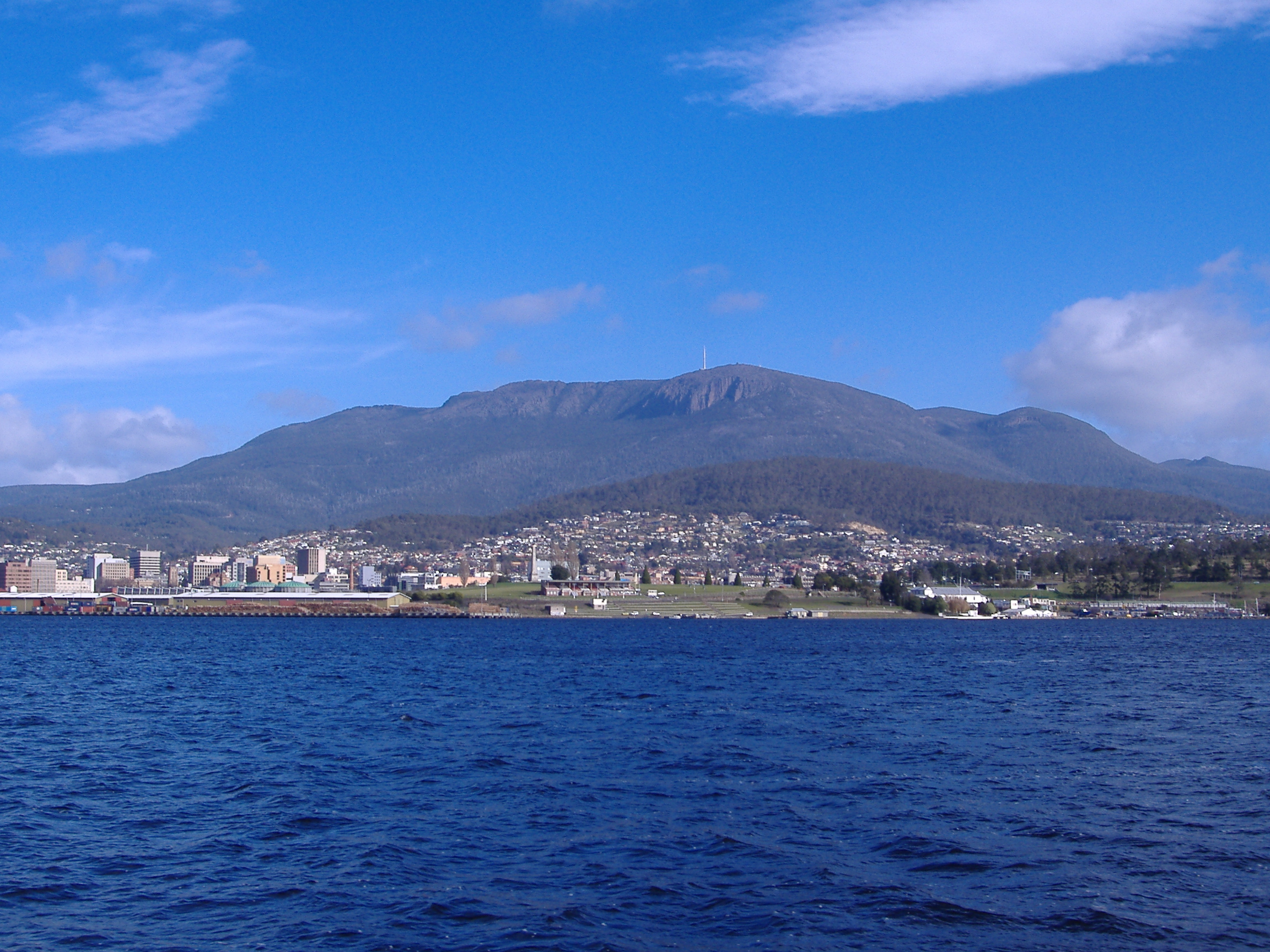
- A view of the Wellington Range with Hobart in the foreground

Highest point
- Peak: Kunanyi / Mount Wellington
- Elevation: 1,269 m (4,163 ft); AHD
- Coordinates: 42°53′24″S 147°13′48″E

Geography
- Location within Tasmania
- Country: Australia
- State: Tasmania
- Range coordinates: 42°52′48″S 146°56′24″E

Geology
- Rock type: Dolerite

The Wellington Range is a mountain range in the southeast region of Tasmania, Australia. The range is mainly composed of dolerite and features evidence of past glaciation.

Prominent features in the range include the dual-named Kunanyi / Mount Wellington at 1,269 metres (4,163 ft) above sea level, Collins Cap, Collins Bonnet via Myrtle Forest, Trestle Mountain, Mount Marian, Mount Charles and Mount Patrick via Middle Hill. The Wellington Range is part of the Wellington Park Reserve.

== Environment ==
The Wellington Range is home to over 500 unique species of flora, despite being mostly high alpine region. The range forms part of the South-east Tasmania Important Bird Area, identified as such by BirdLife International because of its importance in the conservation of a range of woodland birds, especially the endangered swift parrot and forty-spotted pardalote.

== See also ==
- List of highest mountains of Tasmania
