= Margate, Tasmania =

Margate
- Town
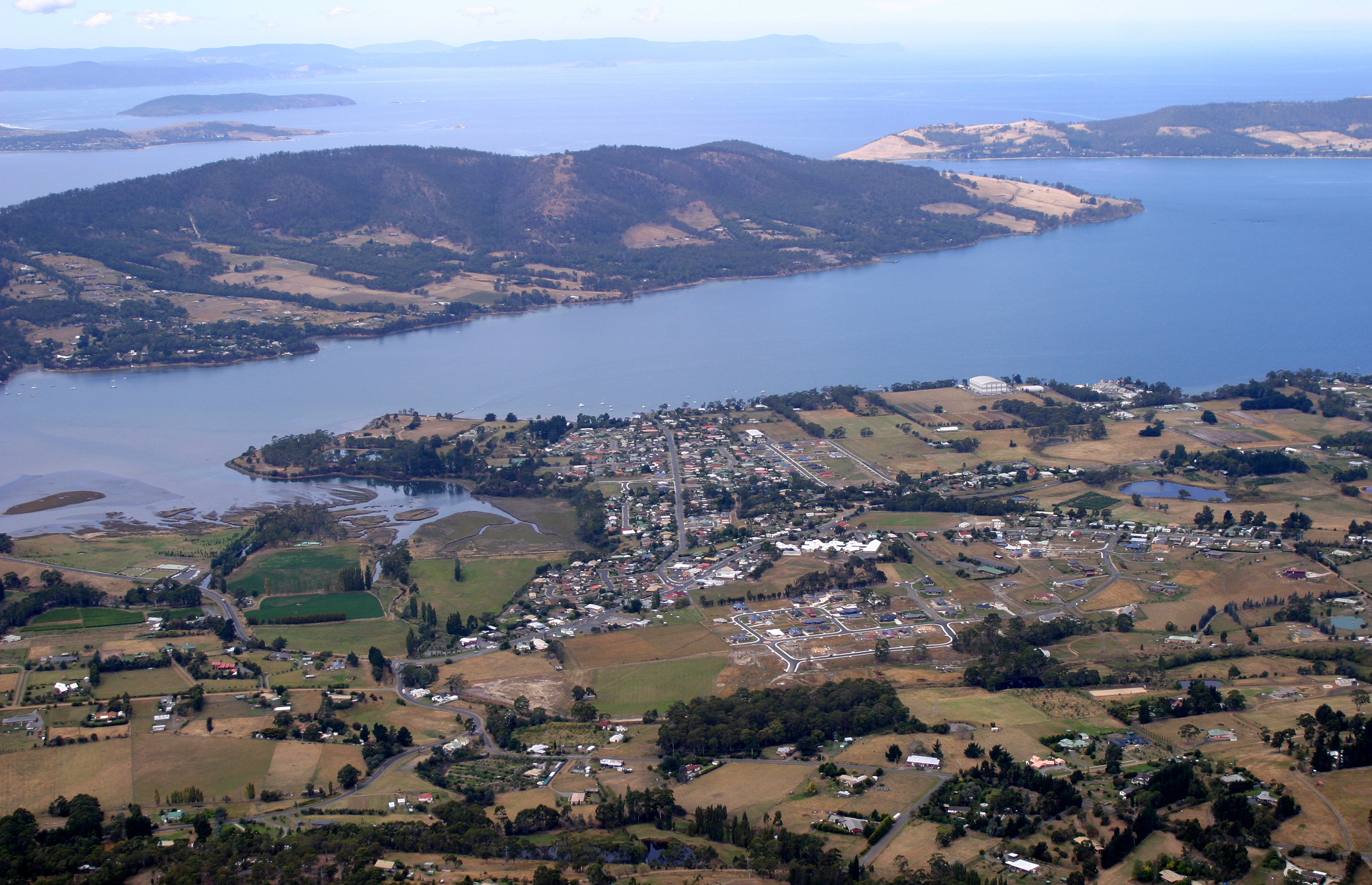
- Aerial of Margate and North-West Bay, c. 2006

- Coordinates: 43°01′46″S 147°15′42″E
- Country: Australia
- State: Tasmania
- LGA: Kingborough
- Location: 20 km (12 mi) S of Hobart; 7 km (4.3 mi) S of Kingston; 6 km (3.7 mi) N of Snug
- Established: 1866

Government
  - State electorate: Franklin
  - Federal division: Franklin

Population
  - Total: 4,239 (2021 census)
- Postcode: 7054

Margate is a coastal town and locality in southern Tasmania, Australia, located on the Channel Highway between the D'Entrecasteaux Channel and the Snug Tiers, approximately 7 km (4.3 mi) south of Kingston and 20 km (12 mi) south of the Hobart central business district. It lies mostly within the Kingborough Council local government area, with a small portion extending into the Huon Valley Council.

Margate developed historically around orcharding and coastal shipping. It was officially gazetted as a township in 1866, and recorded a population of 4,239 at the 2021 census. Today, many residents commute to Hobart or Kingston for employment. The town also supports local industries including retail, hospitality, and aquaculture, with nearby facilities such as Tassal’s salmon processing plant and the Crisp Bros & Haywards Margate Shipyard contributing to township employment.

Margate features a mix of suburban and semi-rural landscapes, with access to the sheltered waters of North-West Bay. Its position along the Channel Highway makes it a regular stopping point for travellers. The town is home to visitor attractions including Dru Point Bicentennial Park and the Margate Train, a roadside attraction featuring a preserved locomotive and carriages repurposed as small businesses beside a former Henry Jones IXL apple packing shed. The Channel Museum in Margate features 24 distinct displays containing over 8,000 items, alongside the Norton Camera Collection, a research library, and a cafe.

== History ==
=== Palawa history ===
The Margate area lies within the traditional lands of the Nuenonne of Bruny Island, who maintained strong kinship and language ties with the neighbouring Muwinina (Hobart area) and Mellukerdee (Huon Valley) bands. These South-East groups shared seasonal access to the D'Entrecasteaux Channel region, gathering for resources, trade, and ceremony under customary protocols of reciprocal custodianship.

=== Early French exploration ===
The first recorded European contact occurred in 1792 when French explorers under Bruni d'Entrecasteaux arrived aboard the frigates Recherche and Espérance. While anchored at North-West Bay in 1792, members of d’Entrecasteaux’s expedition observed signs of the Nuenonne's use and management of the area, including smoke, cut trees, and foot tracks.

A decade later, in 1802, a scientific expedition led by French explorer Nicolas Baudin aboard the ships Géographe and Naturaliste (commanded by Jacques Hamelin) also anchored in North-West Bay. Baudin’s crews established a short-term observatory at the mouth of the North West Bay River to monitor a solar eclipse, gathered provisions, and interacted with the Nuenonne.

=== British settlement ===
British settlement in the Margate district began in the mid-19th century. The town was officially gazetted in 1866, and the Margate Post Office opened on 1 July that year. A government primary school was established in 1869. In the early 20th century, coal mining became an important local industry; the Sandfly Colliery Tramway operated between 1906 and 1922, transporting coal from the mines at Kaoota to a jetty in Margate for shipping.

== Modern times ==
From 2007 to 2010, Austal operated the North West Bay Shipping shipyard.

In 2016, the town marked 150 years since its gazettal with a week-long series of community events and celebrations.

== Demographics ==
Historical population
Year	Pop.	±%
2006	3,397	—
2011	3,625	+6.7%
2016	3,920	+8.1%
2021	4,239	+8.1%
Source: Australian Bureau of Statistics census data.

At the 2021 census, Margate had a population of 4,239 people. The median age was 44 years, slightly above the national median of 38. Children aged 0–14 years made up 18.4% of the population, while people aged 65 years and over accounted for 22.4%.

The majority of residents (83.3%) were born in Australia, with the next most common country of birth being England (5.1%). Regarding religious affiliation, 53.5% of people stated they had no religion, 12.3% identified as Anglican, and 10.7% as Catholic. An additional 6.3% identified broadly as Christian (not further defined), and 4.1% did not state a religion.

The population has grown steadily in recent decades, particularly during the early 2000s housing boom, as the town developed into a commuter hub for Kingston and Hobart. New residential subdivisions and infrastructure projects have accompanied this growth, while the town also supports local industries including aquaculture, hospitality, and small-scale agriculture.

Of those in the labour force aged 15 years and over, 52.7% of Margate residents were employed full-time, 37.6% worked part-time, and 3.7% were unemployed. These figures are similar to the broader Tasmanian labour force profile, although Margate recorded a slightly lower unemployment rate than the state average of 5.9%.

The median weekly household income in Margate was A$1,937, which is above the Tasmanian state median (A$1,370). In a 2009 lifestyle survey conducted by the Sunday Tasmanian, Margate residents were ranked among the happiest in the state.

== Geography ==
Margate is surrounded by a mix of coastal bushland, vineyards, pasture, and residential development. Its location along the Channel Highway makes it a key transit point for travellers heading to destinations further south, such as Kettering, Snug, and the ferry to Bruny Island.

== Tourism ==
Margate includes several sites of historical and recreational interest, and serves as a stopping point for travellers heading south along the Channel Highway.

=== Margate Train ===
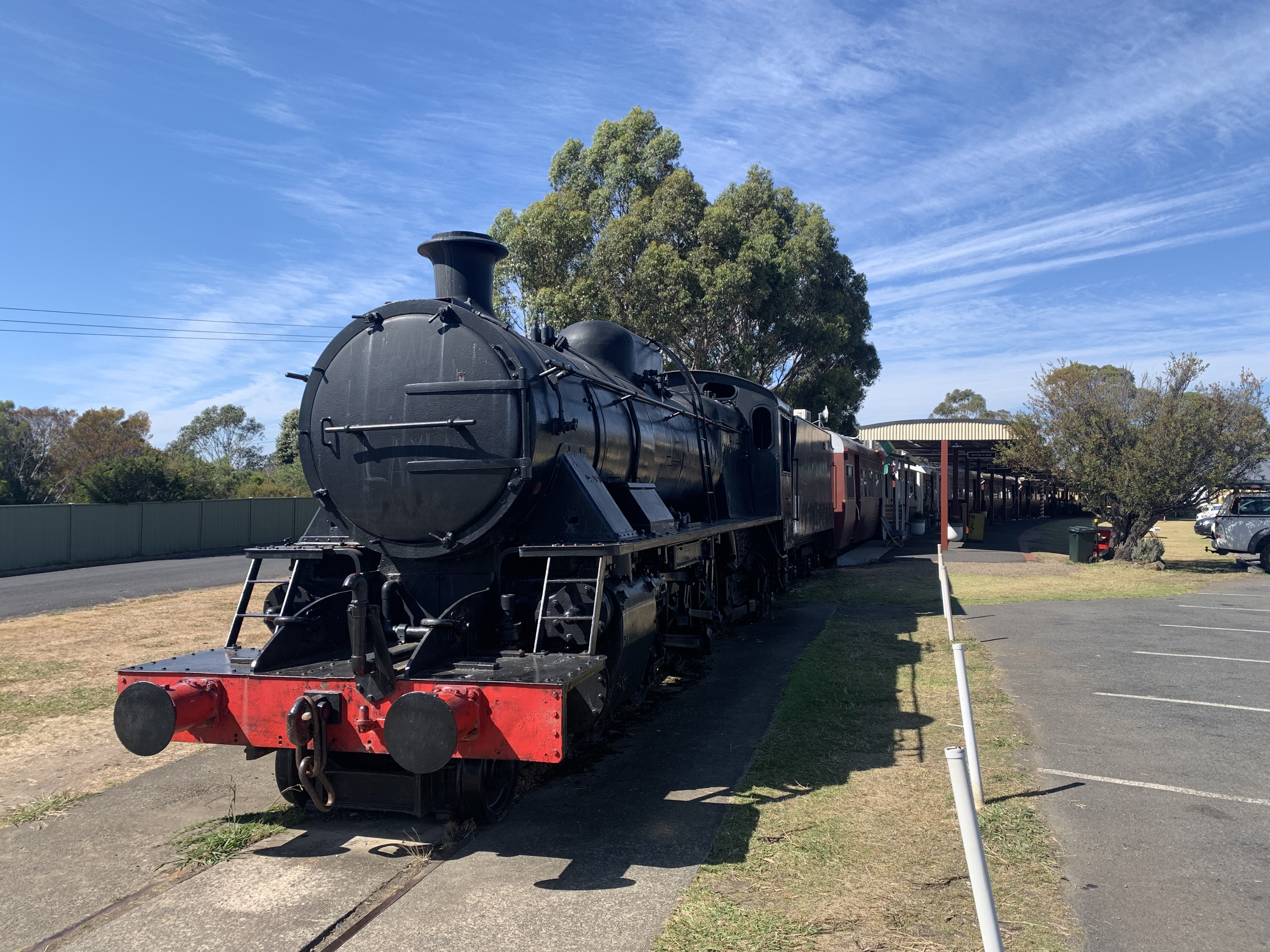
The Margate Train

Located near the northern entrance to the town, the Margate Train is a roadside attraction featuring the preserved locomotive MA3. A number of former passenger carriages are positioned behind the locomotive and have been adapted for commercial use, housing small retail outlets and a café. The display sits adjacent to a former Henry Jones IXL apple packing shed, referencing the area's fruit-growing history.

=== Channel Museum ===
The Channel Museum presents exhibitions on the cultural, social, and maritime history of the D'Entrecasteaux Channel region. Its collections include photographs, documents, and objects relating to shipbuilding, agriculture, and domestic life in the Channel district.

=== Dru Point Bicentennial Park ===
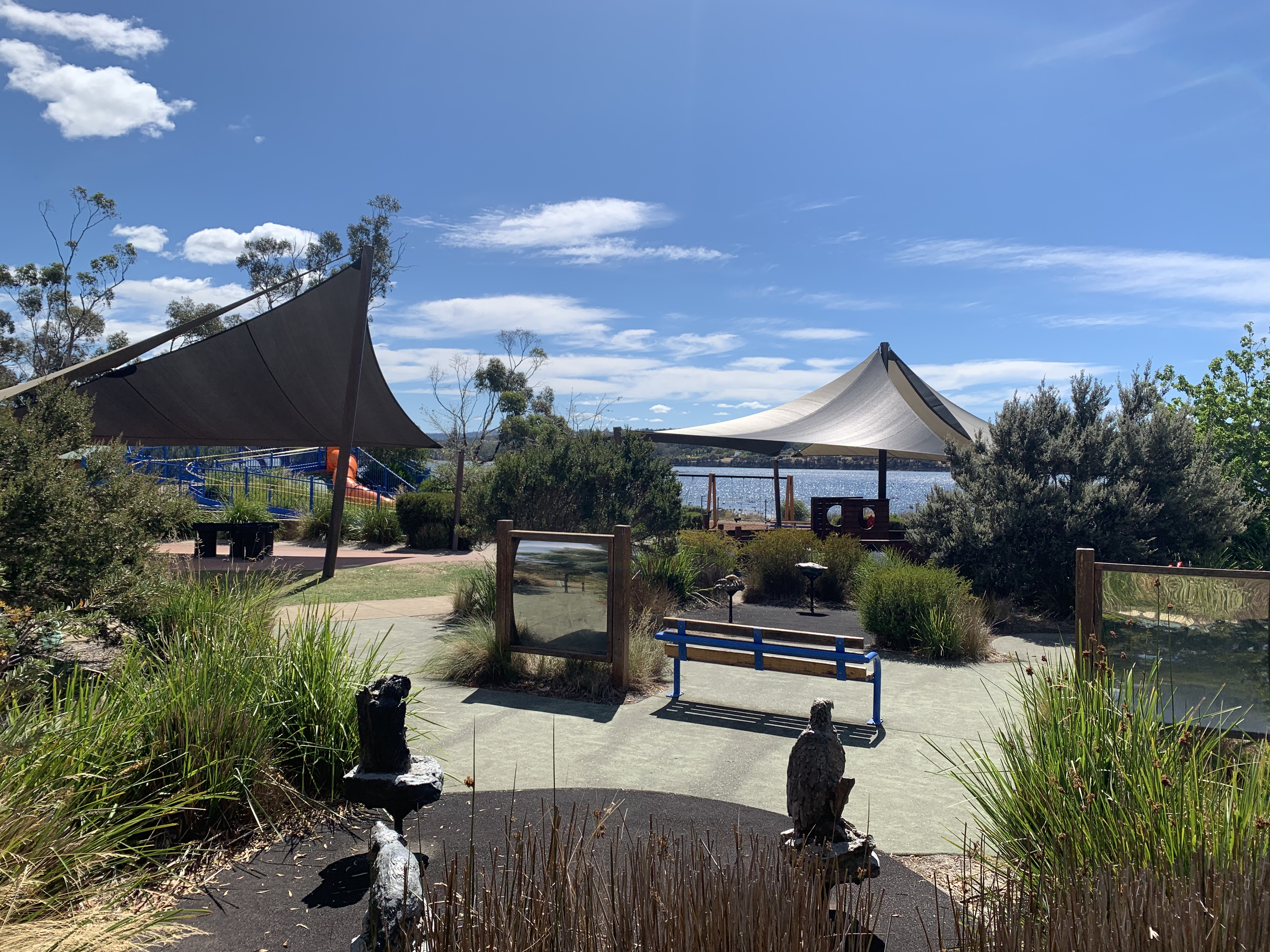
Dru Point Bicentennial Park

Situated on the foreshore of North-West Bay, Dru Point Bicentennial Park includes walking trails, picnic areas, play equipment, and a coastal reserve. It functions as a public recreation space for residents of the Channel region and visitors passing through Margate.

=== Nandroya Vineyard ===
Nandroya Vineyard is a small cool-climate vineyard established in the early 1990s on sloping ground above the North West Bay River. Covering approximately 1.5 ha (3.7 acres), it is planted with pinot noir and sauvignon blanc and oriented north-east to maximise sunlight during the growing season. The vineyard operates on a small scale and is representative of the boutique viticulture found throughout the Channel region.

== Amenities ==
Margate provides a range of essential services for residents of the Channel region, including supermarkets, medical clinics, community facilities, and recreational spaces.

Margate Primary School is the town’s main government primary school. In 2009, the school received A$3 million in federal government funding for new buildings under the national economic stimulus plan.

A childcare centre in Margate formerly operated by ABC Learning narrowly avoided closure during the company’s national collapse in the same year.

The town also includes churches, sports facilities, and public open spaces such as Dru Point Bicentennial Park, which features walking trails, playgrounds, and picnic areas.

== Notable people ==
- Charles Frost (1882–1964) – Member of the Australian House of Representatives for Franklin (1929–1931, 1934–1946), Minister in the Chifley government, and later Australian High Commissioner to Ceylon (1947–1950). He established an orchard in Margate and was educated at the local state school.
- Jack Frost (1911–1995) – Son of Charles Frost. Member of the Tasmanian House of Assembly for Franklin (1964–1976). Served as Chair of Committees and Minister in the Reece Ministry.
