= Peter Murrell Conservation Area =

Protected area in Tasmania, Australia

- IUCN category V (protected landscape/seascape)
- Location within Tasmania
- Location: Tasmania, Huntingfield
- Nearest city: Hobart
- Coordinates: 43°00′39″S 147°17′33″E
- Area: 1.35 km^{2} (0.52 sq mi)
- Established: 8 December 1999
- Governing body: Tasmanian Parks and Wildlife Service
- Website: Official website

The Peter Murrell Conservation Area is located in Huntingfield, Tasmania, approximately 15 km (9.3 mi) south of the state's capital city, Hobart. The conservation area has an area of 135 ha (330 acres) and is one of three reserves within the Peter Murrell Reserves. Also within these reserves are the Peter Murrell State Reserve (133 ha (330 acres)) and a Public Reserve (9 ha (22 acres)). These reserves and the Conservation Area lie at the base of the Tinderbox Peninsula, between the suburbs of Kingston, Howden and Blackman's Bay. The Peter Murrell Conservation Area surrounds the northern, western and southern sides of the Peter Murrell State Reserve.

== Area description ==
Lying within the Derwent Estuary – Bruny Catchment of Southern Tasmania, the Peter Murrell Conservation Area comprises a number of small creeks and streams. These drain land from South Arm up to Old Beach on the eastern side of the Derwent Estuary, and from Granton to Gordon and Bruny Island on the western side. Within the catchment area, the North West Bay River is the only major river, flowing from the southern side of Mt. Wellington into North West Bay, at the southwestern corner of the Peter Murrell Conservation Area.

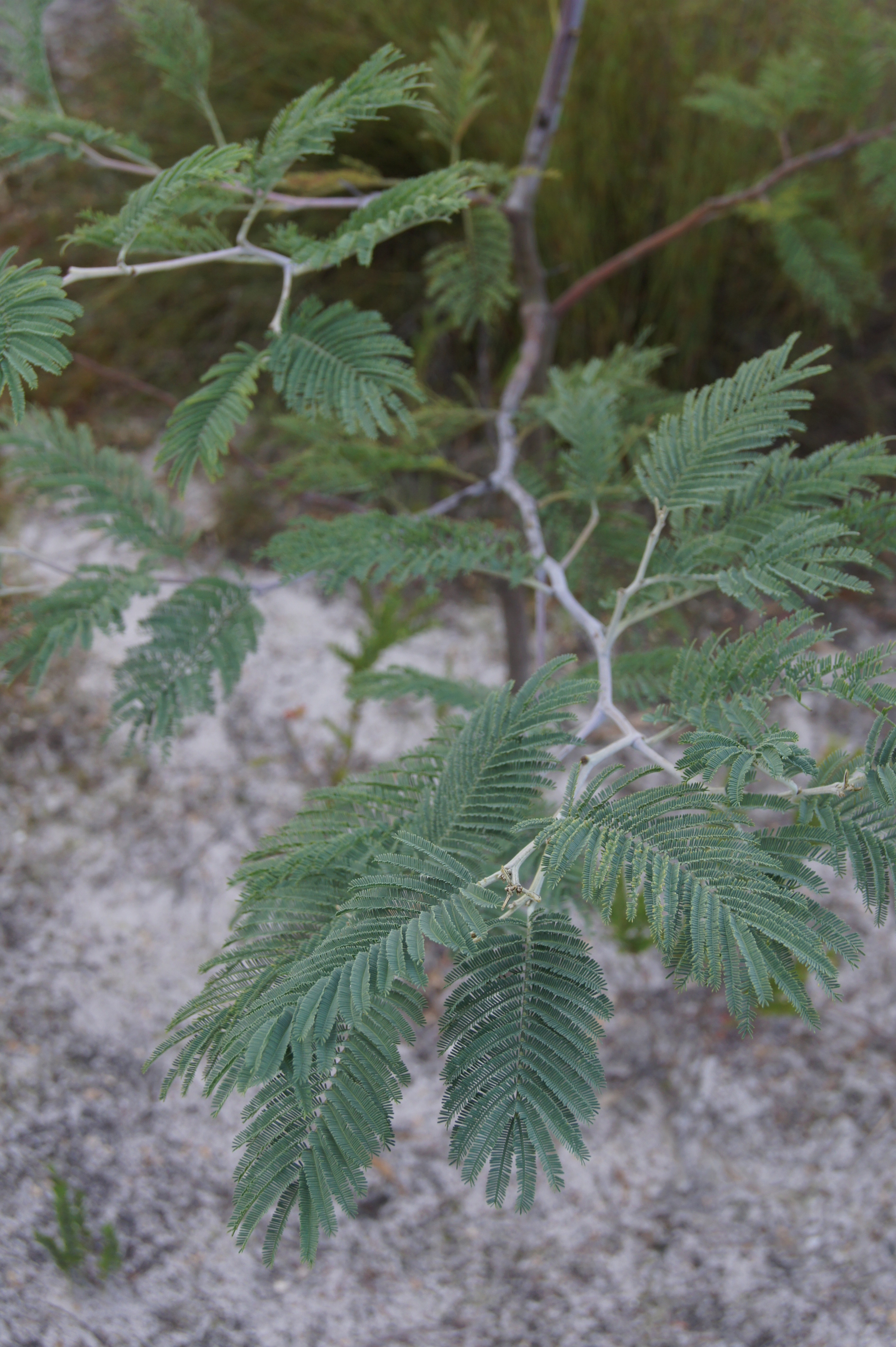
Wattle (Acacia sp.) - native plant

This Conservation Area is part of the South East Tasmania Bioregion, with a protection level of between 15.01 and 30%, under the National Reserve System. Bioregions are areas of Australia classified into large distinct bioregions based on common climate, geology, landform, native vegetation and species information, and are the reporting unit for assessing the status of Australia's native ecosystems and the level of protection in the National Reserve System.

== Ecology ==
=== Flora ===
The dominant vegetation types in the Peter Murrell Conservation Area are dry heathlands and heath-shrub black peppermint woodland and forests. In the buttongrass along the east/west creek lines, small areas of peat exist. Within the Conservation Area, nine major vegetation units have been identified. These include the dominant black peppermint (Eucalyptus amygdalina) coastal forest and woodland, with a heath understorey. A small area of buttongrass also exists along Buttongrass Creek. Inhabiting the down-slope areas within the Conservation Area are damper vegetation types.

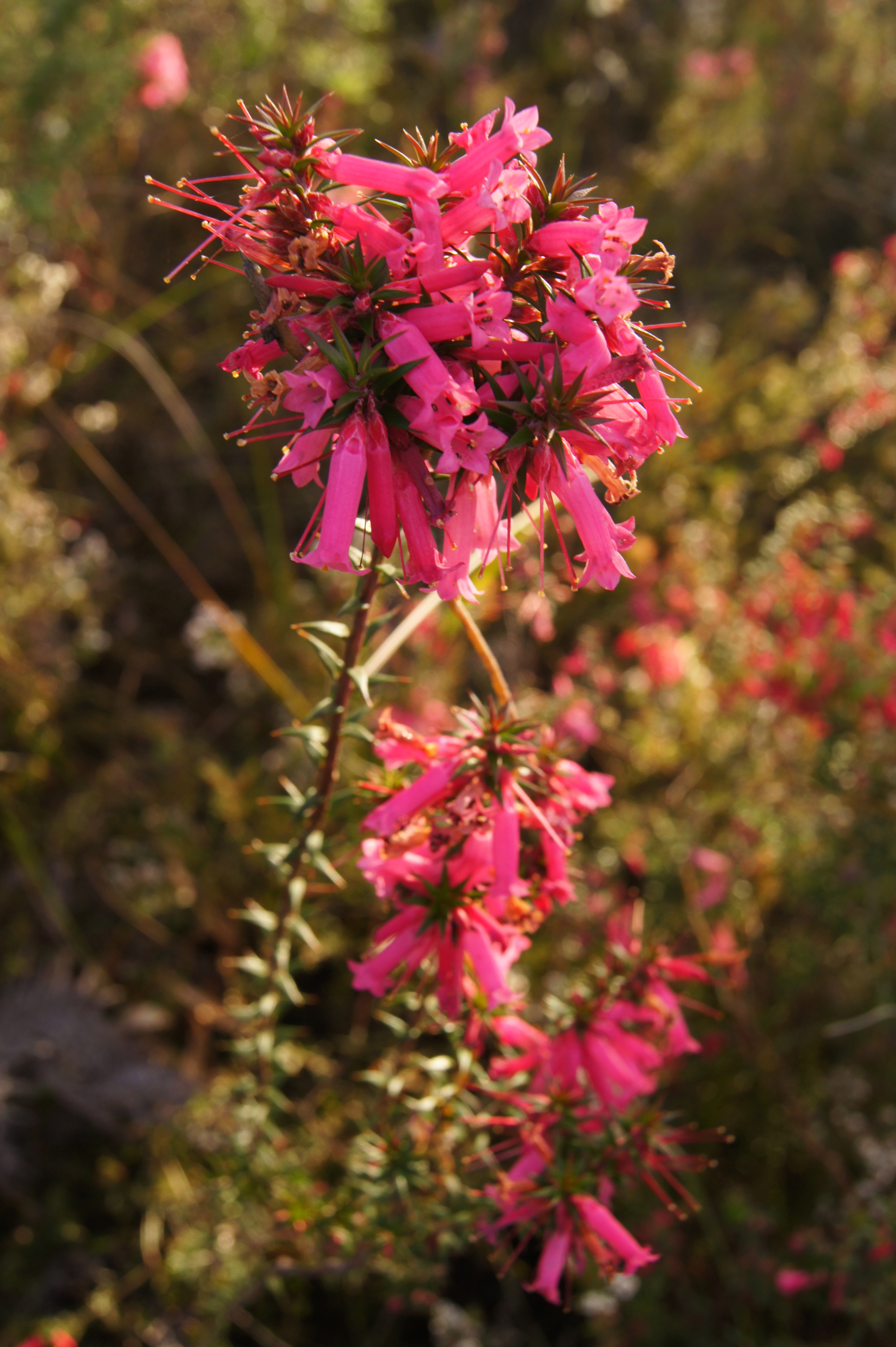
Swamp heath (Epacris impressa) - native plant

Within the Peter Murrell Conservation Area, 250 native flowering plants have been recorded, comprising approximately 15% of Tasmania's flowering plants. Of these 250 plants, 13 are endemic to Tasmania. The area also provides habitat for 113 introduced plant species, only a small number of which are troublesome weeds, however. During late winter and early spring, numerous shrubs of the wattle and pea families produce colourful displays.

Within this Conservation Area, 37 orchid species exist. The area is known for its orchid diversity, with one of the highest densities of orchid species anywhere in Tasmania. Of the vast number of orchid species inhabiting the Peter Murrell Conservation Area, five endemic orchid species exist, including the trim leek-orchid (Prasophyllum continuum) and the dark-finger-orchid (Caladenia atrata). In recent years it appears that the orchid diversity and abundance has been declining. A potential explanation for these declines are infrequent burning events, absence of rain following prescribed burns, and firebreak slashing during key flowering periods, October to early December.

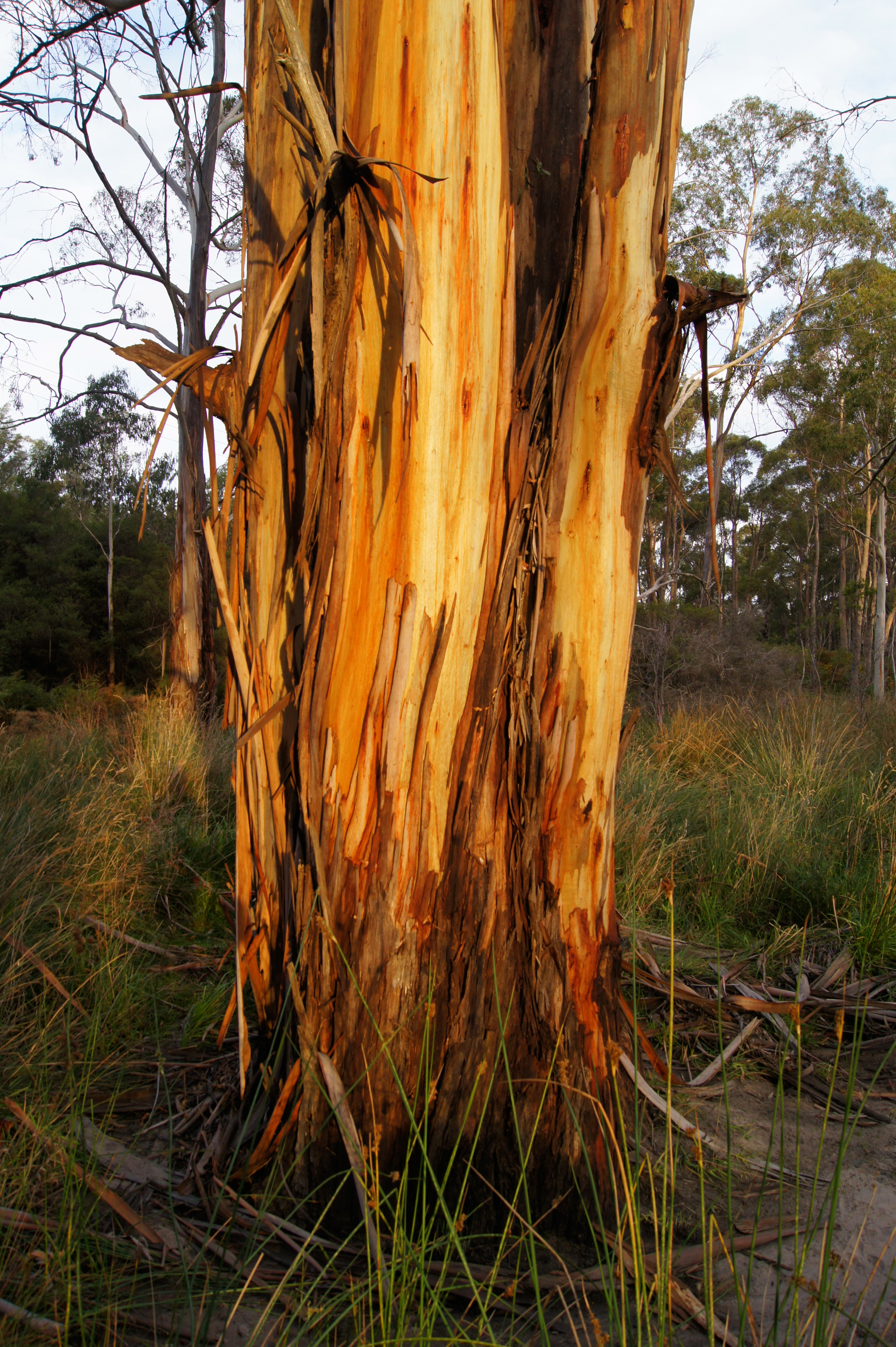
Trunk of a gum tree (Eucalyptus sp.) - native plant

Two threatened plant species inhabit the Peter Murrell Conservation Area, the twisting rapier sedge (Lepidosperma tortuosum) and the gentle rush (Juncus amabilis). Both of these species are listed as rare at the Tasmanian state level.

=== Fauna ===
==== Mammals ====
In 2010, it was reported that 13 mammal species inhabited the Peter Murrell Conservation Area. Other reports list 24 mammal species living in the area, 19 of which are native to Tasmania, while the remaining 5 are introduced species. Some of the 24 species reported have not been seen in the Conservation Area for a number of years. For example, platypuses (Ornithorhynchus anatinus) were once regularly seen in Heron Pond but have now not been seen since 2010.

Other native mammals listed as inhabiting the Peter Murrell Conservation Area include: the short-beaked echidna (Tachyglossus aculeatus), eastern quoll (Dasyurus viverrinus), southern brown bandicoot (Isoodon obesulus), eastern barred bandicoot (Perameles gunnii), common ringtail possum (Pseudocheirus peregrinus), sugar glider (Petaurus breviceps), common brushtail possum (Trichosurus vulpecular), long-nosed potoroo (Potorous tridactylus), Tasmanian bettong (Bettongia gaimardi), Tasmanian pademelon (Thylogale billardierii), Bennett's wallaby (Macropus rufogriseus), Gould's wattled bat (Chalinolobus gouldii), chocolate wattled bat (Chalinolobus morio), lesser long-eared bat (Nyctophilus geoffroyi), southern forest bat (Vespadelus regulus), little forest bat (Vespadelus vulturnus), water rat (Hydromys chrysogaster) and swamp rat (Rattus lutreolus).

Five introduced mammals have been identified as inhabiting the area, including: the cat (Felis catus), house mouse (Mus musculus), brown rat (Rattus norvegicus), black rat (Rattus rattus) and European rabbit (Oryctolagus cuniculus).

Of all the mammal species inhabiting the Peter Murrell Conservation Area, one is listed as vulnerable under the commonwealth's Environment Protection and Biodiversity Conservation Act 1999, the eastern barred bandicoot (Perameles gunnii). This is a small terrestrial marsupial, found in south-eastern Australia. The species has a high fecundity, with up to five litters per year, an average of 2-3 young per litter, a gestation period of 12 days, and sexual maturity reached a 3 months (females) and 5 months (males). Once having a fairly large distribution on the south-eastern part of mainland Australia, the distribution and abundance of this species has declined significantly since European settlement, primarily due to the invasive predatory fox (Vulpes vulpes). The total number of individuals of this species is now considered to be less than 200 on mainland Australia. Wild populations of the eastern-barred bandicoot still exist, and are stronger, in Tasmania, but distributions are limited to the north and southeast of the state. However, it is thought that those factors threatening populations of the eastern barred bandicoot on mainland Australia also pose significant threats to Tasmanian populations. Consequently, eastern barred bandicoot populations in Tasmania are too believed to be declining, with the species now listed as near threatened on the IUCN Red List of Threatened Species.

==== Birds ====
In 2012, eBird recorded 100 bird species. Other reports list that only 70 species are present, but this is a false underestimate. It is one of the last few places where the endangered Forty-spotted pardalote is still found. This species can be found in white gum, in the car park and the trees around the ponds, though Juvenile Spotted pardalote have been mistaken.

Other bird species which have been recorded there are the Australian wood duck, pacific black duck, chestnut teal, hoary-headed grebe, brown quail, common bronzewing, cuckoos, tawny frogmouth, Tasmanian native hen, Eurasian coot, Australasian swamphen, masked lapwing, swamp barrier, laughing kookaburra, yellow-failed black-cockatoo, green rosella, superb fairywren, eastern spinebill, little wattlebird, yellow wattlebird, honeyeaters, pardalotes, striated fieldwren, brown thornbill, black-faced cuckoo shrike, grey shrike thrush, golden whistler, dusky wood swallow, grey butcherbird, Australian magpie, grey currawong, grey fantail, satin flycatcher, forest raven, scarlet robin, dusky robin, welcome swallow and European goldfinch.

==== Invertebrates, reptiles and amphibians ====
As is the case with birds of the Peter Murrell Conservation Area, recent comprehensive information on invertebrates, reptiles and amphibians is lacking. Extensive reports and observation in the late 1990s found there to be six reptile, three amphibian and 151 invertebrate species extant in the area.

The chaostola skipper (Antipodia chaostola), a species of butterfly, is listed as endangered under Tasmanian state legislation. While found in New South Wales, Victoria and Tasmania, the Tasmanian populations of this species are considered to be a separate subspecies, Antipodia chaostola leucophaea. A study into the ecology and conservation of the Tasmanian sub-species, conducted in 2000, found that the Tasmanian habitat of the Chaostola skipper has been significantly reduced over the past two hundred years, both in extent and quality. Furthermore, this habitat decline is thought to be ongoing. The continued fragmentation and destruction of the Chaostola skipper's habitat was considered to be the main cause behind its population declines. Additionally, while not listed at the state or national level, twelve insect species in the Peter Murrell Conservation Area have been listed as rare or endemic.

== Geology and landforms ==
The parent materials within the Peter Murrell Conservation Area include sandstone, siltstone and mudstone. The soils in the area are typically sandy. On sloped areas, these soils are well drained. Two ponds, Penrhyn and Heron ponds, exist in the northwestern portion of the Conservation Area.

== Environmental threats and issues ==
=== Land use and development ===
The Peter Murrell Conservation Area is located in the municipality of Kingborough, an area of primarily low density, residential land use, as well as commercial, retail and administrative land use. The area supports local industries including fish processing, aquaculture, tourism, viticulture, boat building and civil engineering.

With these land uses prominent in the area, the primary source of land use impacts in and surrounding the Peter Murrell Conservation Area is urban development, particularly future developments. With regard to industrial development, some land use conflicts exist because the Conservation Area, and associated reserves, border the Huntingfield industrial area. Consequently, there is no capacity for extension of this industrial area. Similarly, a major residential development has been proposed for an area south of Huntingfield, however the proximity of this to the Peter Murrell Conservation area places environmental pressure on this proposal.

Significant problems are also associated with storm water management, with large amounts of sediment being deposited on Coffee Creak, on the western side of the Conservation Area. This deposition damages native vegetation and habitat. These impacts also mean that there are indirect considerations involving development upstream of the Conservation Area. For example, development upstream and adjacent to Coffee Creek, on the Conservation Area's western side, could detrimentally effect the Conservation Area and its associated reserves. Local water courses are particularly sensitive to pollution and sedimentation.

=== Introduced species ===
A number of invasive plant species inhabit the Peter Murrell Conservation Area and threaten native vegetation. These invasive plant species include gorse (Ulex europeaus), Spanish heath (Erica lusitanica), English broom (Cytisus scoparius), canary broom (Genista monspessulana), boneseed (Chrysanthemoides monilifera), blackberry (Rubus fruticosus), blue-butterfly-bush (Psoralea pinnata) and introduced wattles (Acacia spp.). Invasive species such as these can threaten ecosystems as they can displace native species, contribute to land degradation and lessen overall productivity.

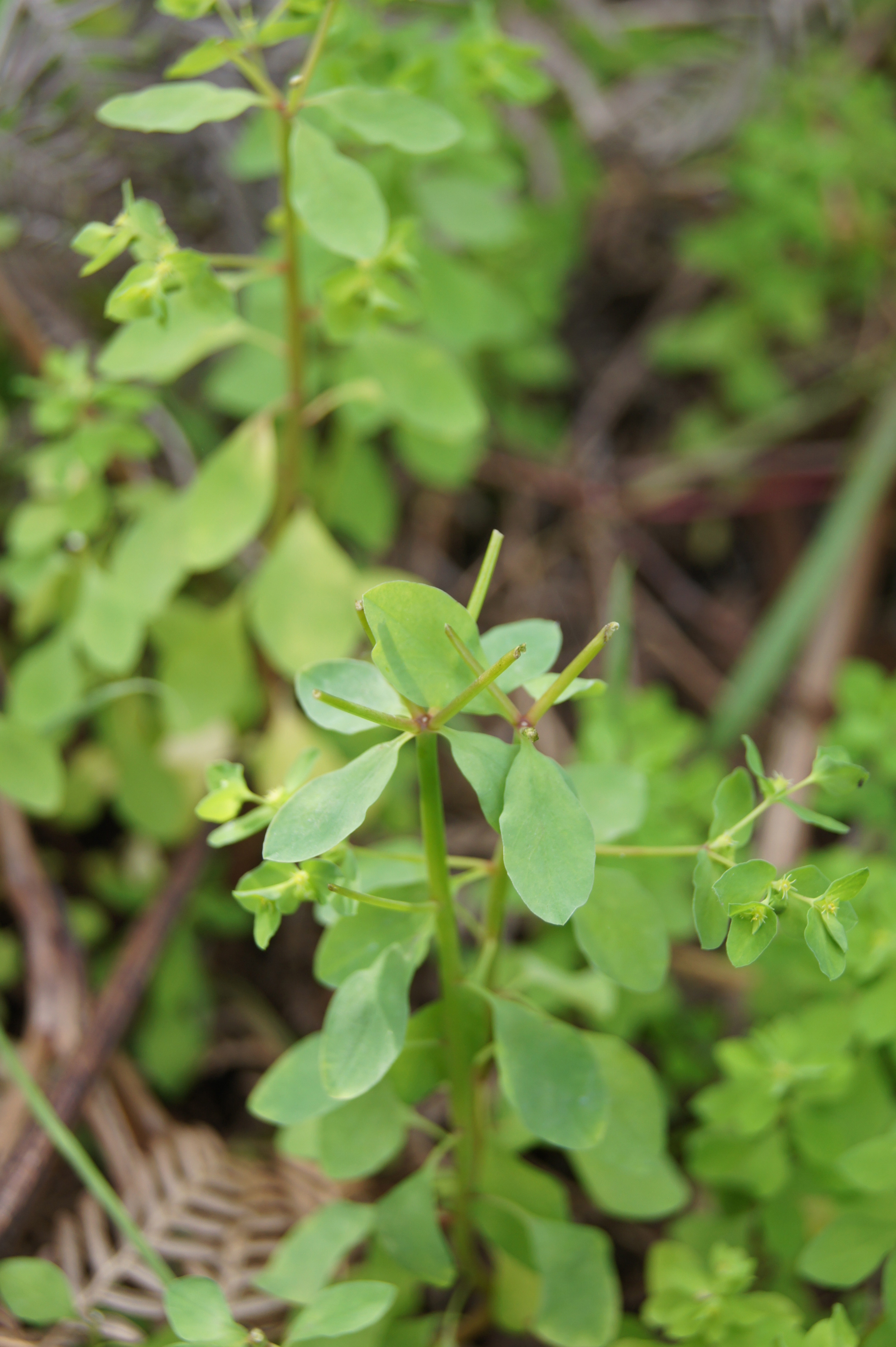
Unidentified invasive plant

In addition to these invasive plant species, a block within the Peter Murrell Conservation Area is infected with root rot (Phytophthora cinnamomi), a soilborne plant pathogen listed as a "Key Threatening Process" under the Environmental Protection and Biodiversity Conservation (EPBC) Act 1999, since 2000. This disease can cause extinction of flora populations, reductions in primary productivity within affected ecosystems, and loss and degradation of flora and fauna habitats. Biodiversity of buttongrass and orchid communities in the Peter Murrell Conservation Area is particularly threatened by root rot.

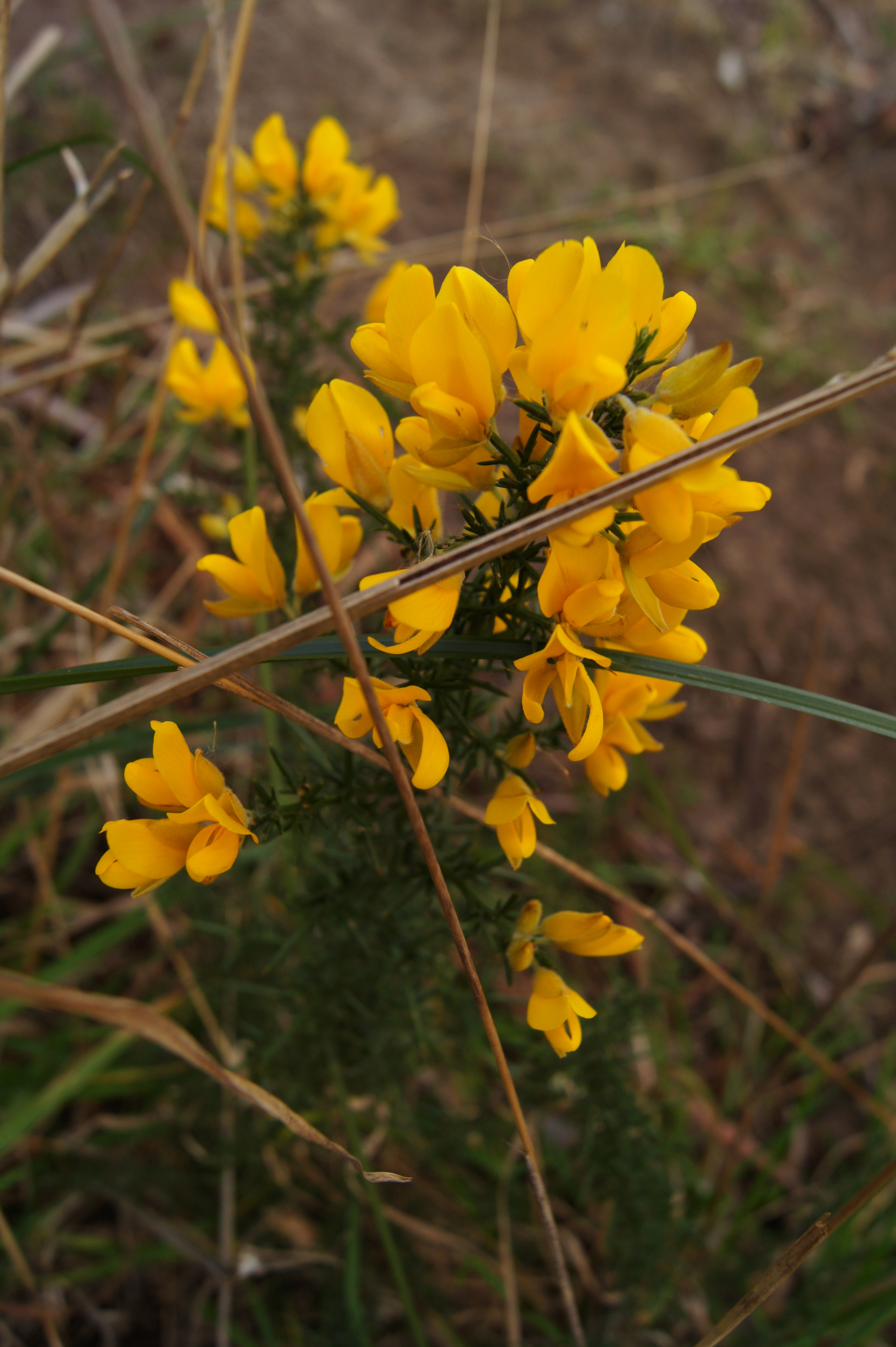
Gorse (Ulex europeaus) - invasive plant

== Management ==
=== Legislation ===
The Peter Murrell Conservation Area is managed under the National Parks and Reserves Management Act and was reserved under the Nature Conservation Act. Additionally, management of the area must be in accordance with the Threatened Species Protection Act 1995. The Tasmanian Reserves Code of Practice 2003 is also important in providing guiding principles for management of the reserves. With Aboriginal heritage sites in the area, the Aboriginal Relics Act 1975 is also important legislation, protecting these sites and setting out statutory obligations for the TPWS to protect and preserve Aboriginal sites. The Land Use Planning and Approvals Act 1994 is also relevant, as it contains provisions determining preparation of planning schemes. Also applicable is the national EPBC Act 1999, as a 'Key Threatening Process', Phytophthora cinnamomi, has been identified in the Peter Murrell Conservation Area. Additionally, with the Peter Murrell Conservation Area providing habitat for the eastern barred bandicoot, a species nationally listed as vulnerable, the EPBC Act 1999 is applicable to matters concerning this species.

=== General ===
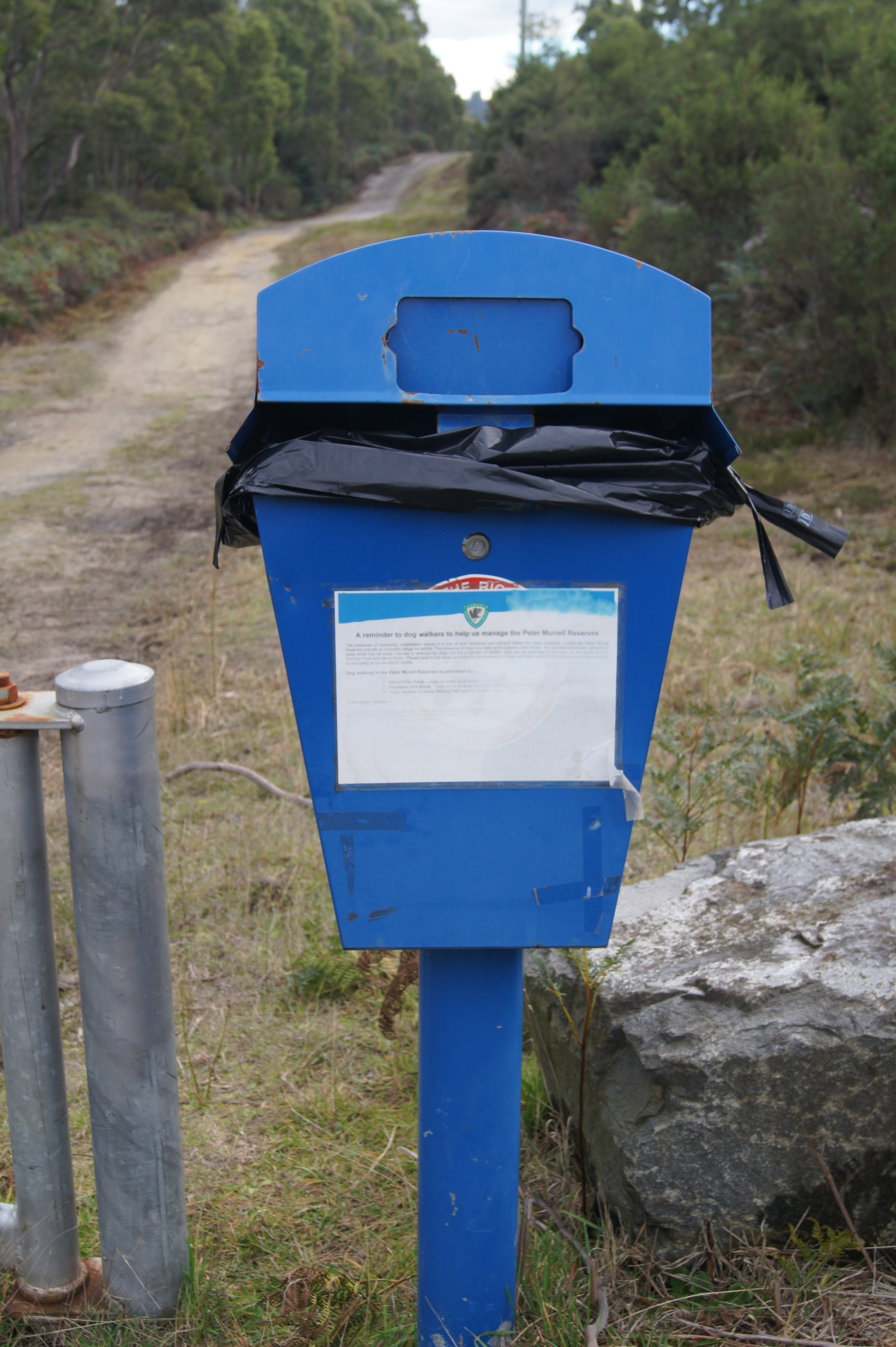
Rubbish bin facilities - erected by the TPWS

The Peter Murrell Reserves, comprising the Conservation Area, State Reserve and Public Reserve, are managed as one land management unit of 277 ha. Management of the Peter Murrell Conservation Area is the responsibility of the Tasmanian Parks and Wildlife Service (TPWS). A 25 ha portion of the area, however, is leased by the Huntingfield Pony and Riding Club, which is responsible for fire control, while the TPWS maintains responsibility for vegetation management.

As part of the municipality of Kingborough, the Conservation Area is zoned as 'Environmental Management' under the Kingborough Planning Scheme 2000., and the Draft Kingborough Council Planning Scheme 2012. Classified as 'Environmental Management', the aim with respect to the Peter Murrell Conservation Area is to: provide protection and management of natural and cultural resources, including cultural heritage, natural heritage, scenic landscapes, fragile landforms, water catchments, coastal area and areas of recreational value; prevent urban sprawl by not allowing ribbon residential development between townships; and allow use or development that is compatible with these values.

Management actions undertaken by the TPWS include provision of facilities such as car parks and doggy bags and disposal bins. Particular locations within the Conservation Area have been designated for particular uses, as a means of providing appropriate protection to flora and fauna living within the Conservation Area. For example, a horse riding trail extends from the northwestern tip of the Conservation Area, around the western and southern perimeters, to the southeastern corner. Designated fire trails also exist within the area.

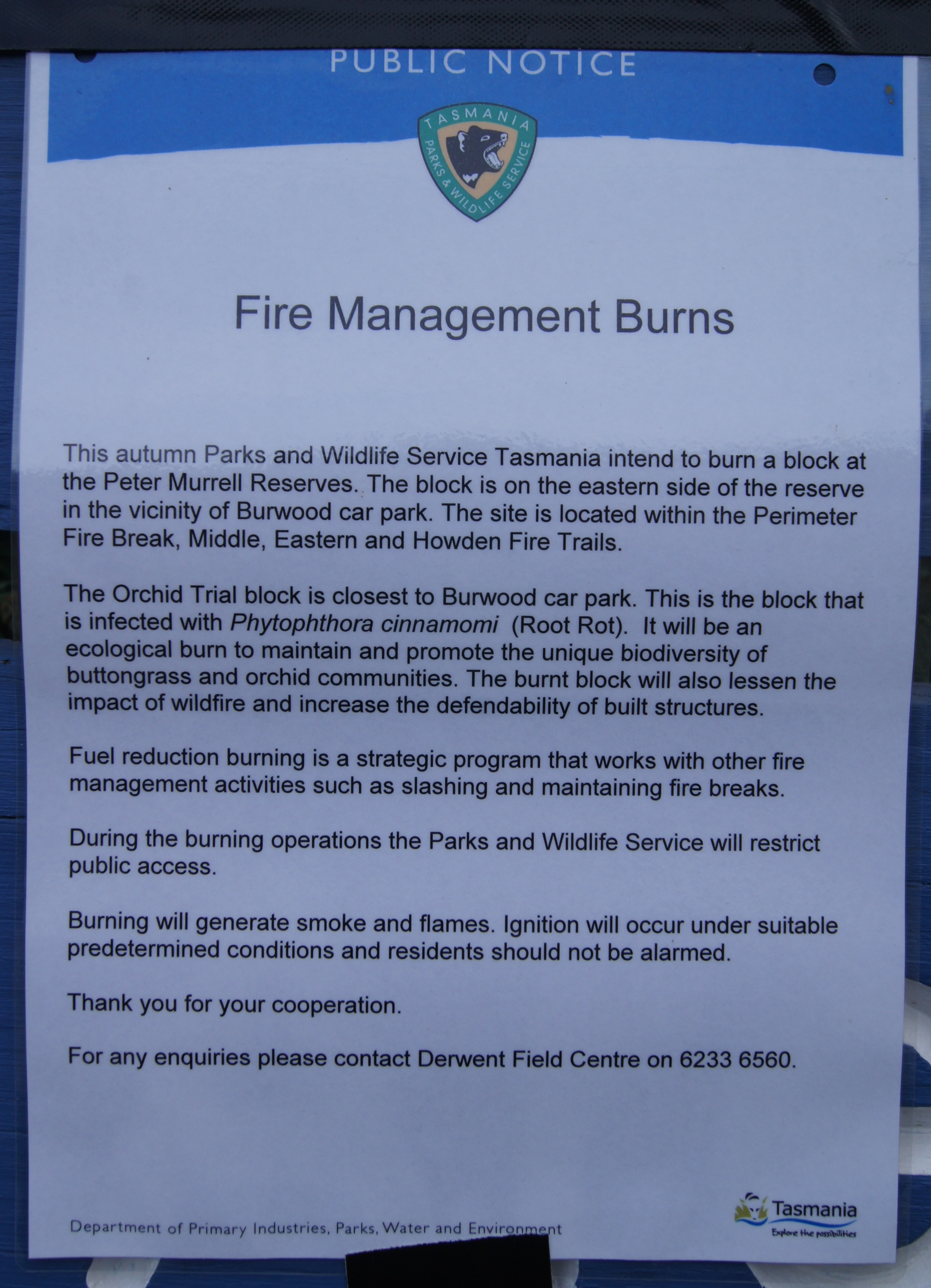
Signage notifying the public of fire management burns to eradicate Phytophthora cinnamomi, erected by the TPWS

Another management action employed by the managing authority, TPWS, is the execution of fire management burns as a means of eradicating Phytophthora cinnamomi. Such a management action can make a significant contribution toward the protection of biodiversity, as Phytophthora cinnamomi poses a serious threat to native vegetation in the Conservation Area, particularly the biodiversity of buttongrass and orchid communities. Fire management practices are also employed as a means of protecting the Conservation Area's orchid community. The Fire Management Plan for the Peter Murrell Reserves (2006), was developed for a variety of reasons, some of which were to provide ecological and fuel reduction outcomes, and facilitate maintenance of ideal conditions for orchid regeneration.

Another important measure being taken to protect one of the Conservation Area's threatened species, the eastern barred bandicoot, is the development and ongoing work of Tasmania's Fox Eradication Program. Now managed by the Resource Management and Conservation division of the Department of Primary Industries, Parks, Water and Environment, this program was first part of the TPWS, at its inception in 2002.

While the Peter Murrell Conservation Area is managed by the TPWS, there is currently no Management Plan for this area, or its associated reserves.
