= Taroona High School =

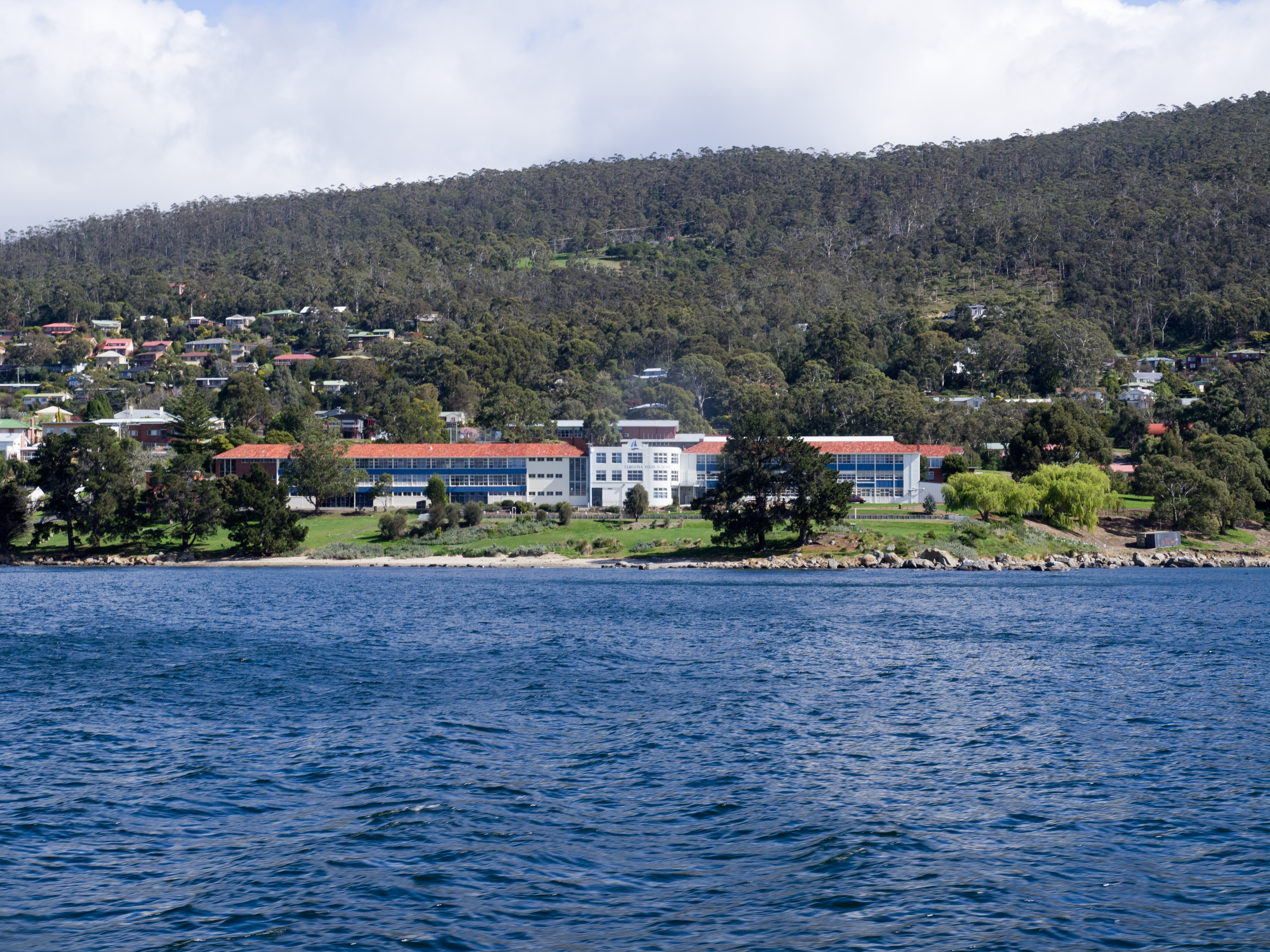
- Taroona High School from across the River Derwent

Location
- Meath Avenue; Taroona, Hobart, Tasmania; Australia; 42°56′34″S 147°21′16″E

Information
- Type: Government comprehensive junior secondary school
- Motto: Enriching lives through learning
- Established: 1958
- Status: Open
- School district: Southern
- Educational authority: Department for Education, Children and Young People
- Oversight: Office of Tasmanian Assessment, Standards & Certification
- Principal: Charles White
- Teaching staff: 79.9 FTE (2024)
- Years: Year 7-12
- Gender: Co-educational
- Enrolment: 1,159 (2024)
- Campus type: Suburban
- Houses: Crayfish; Gellibrand; Cartwright; Droughty
- Website: taroonahigh.education.tas.edu.au

Taroona High School is a government co-educational comprehensive junior secondary school located in Taroona, a suburb of Hobart, Tasmania, Australia. Established in 1958, the school caters for approximately 1,200 students from Years 7 to 10 (Taroona@UTAS caters for years 11 to 12). The school is administered by the Department for Education, Children and Young People.

In 2019 student enrollments were 1,110. The school principal is Charles White. The school is planning to expand into years 11 and 12 with limited courses starting in the 2022 school year at the University of Tasmania campus.

The school's most notable former student is Queen Mary of Denmark.

== Facilities ==
The school is located on the shore of the River Derwent, with a rocky beach. In 2003 Taroona High School underwent a major redevelopment. The school feeder zone covers students in the southern suburbs of Hobart such as Taroona, Dynnyrne and Sandy Bay but students also come from access schools in a wide range of other areas such as West Hobart and Blackmans Bay.

Taroona High School features four building areas each with two or more levels:

- A Block contains the office, principal, general classrooms on the top two floors and a Learning Centre, used for teaching children with special needs. The lower floor houses the Library and the Exploring the Ocean classroom. Construction started in 1957, and it opened for use in 1958, the first building in the school. An extension called the Science Demonstration Block was added in 1969.
- B Block is composed of a mixture of general classes as well as art rooms on the top floor, with kitchens for food based courses, general purpose classrooms on the ground floor, as well as Design and Technology workshop facilities and a fully equipped Canteen on the lower ground floor.
- C Block was originally built in 1962. C Block is mainly devoted to both Music, Drama, and Contemporary Music classes, with all music rooms on the top floor of the new extension of the block, and Drama and Contemporary Music facilities below. C Block now contains multiple new classrooms that are used for Grade 10 classes, as well as staff offices. The entire block recently underwent extensions and renovations.
- D Block was a temporary structure that contained class rooms, but was removed.
- Gym - The gym is used for whole school assemblies, but mainly for the use of indoor Physical Education classes. The gym is also used for music and drama performances. Construction finished and it was opened on 26 October 1970.
- S Block contains Science labs and classrooms as well as a seismograph and two mobile computer labs contained within the science prep room.
- The link block connecting A and B block was constructed between 1987 and 1988. During the concrete pour for level 1 the formwork collapsed.
- Resource Materials Centre was completed in 1977. The library moved there from A block.

Buses transporting students to and from school are operated by Metro Tasmania and Wisby Buses.

=== Public artworks ===
Art at Taroona High School includes the International Orange mural (which is blue and white) painted in 2015 by Josh Foley. in 2011 in the Art for Public Buildings Scheme, a work called Chaos Theory was made in sandblasted glass and cut vinyl by Designhaus. The exterior of the building and logo thereon was painted by Dyson Painters using Wattyl Solagard.

== Curriculum ==
Mandatory subjects within the school vary depending on grade.

- Core subjects: Maths, English, Science, HASS and Wellness.
- Grade Sevens must participate in all core subjects, a full year course in Music and Computing, as well as half-year courses in Art, D&T, Drama, Chinese, French and Home Economics.
- Grade Eights must participate in all core subjects, however they can select three Full year subjects and Two half year subjects as electives
- Grade Nine & Tens must participate in Maths, Science and English in both years as well as complete a History and Social Sciences (HASS) course at least once in grade nine or ten. Wellness is compulsory in years 7-9 only. Students select several subjects on a semester or full year basis. Due to the complexity in the selection of these subjects, a Course Selection Guide is given to each Grade Eight and Nine student every year, usually on the return to third term.
- Music students can study Rock/Music Industry studies or participate in the Senior Concert Band, as well as having the option of participating in the Senior Stage Band.
- There are courses unique to this school (Australia wide) which include exploring the ocean, exploring the ocean advanced, and exploring the coastline, these can include SCUBA diving and snorkelling and as part of these courses students can receive PADI Open Water Diver, First Aid and CPR qualifications as well as teaching marine biology as a year 10 science course.
- Graphic Design is offered to grades 8, 9 and 10.
- There is also a special course in Grade 10 to assist students who struggle to keep up with their normal classes.
- Previously there have also been quarter-year and half-year courses called 'Short Courses' although these are not offered within the current time-table.

In its early years, sports included yachting as an option.

School houses are called Crayfish, Gellibrand, Cartwright and Droughty after land prominences into the River Derwent.

== Taroona@UTAS ==
Taroona@UTAS is Taroona High School's Year 11/12 offering. It is situated within the University of Tasmania's Old IMAS Building which they co-occupy with the University College. It also utilities UTAS's facilities such as engineering and physics labs. Taroona@UTAS's curriculum encompasses several TASC courses, the Certificate III in Aviation (Remote Pilot), and the University Connections Program's Entrepreneurship course. Taroona@UTAS has a timetable that is in-line with that of Hobart College's to easily facilitate dual enrollment.

== Taroona Primary School ==
Taroona High School participates a great deal with the Taroona Primary School, its neighbouring school, the two education facilities making up the Taroona Learning Complex. As a result, a large number of Taroona High students come from Taroona Primary School. The Taroona Learning Centre thus provides schooling from K - 10.

== Feeder schools ==
Associated schools: Albuera Street, Mount Nelson, Princes Street, South Hobart, Taroona Primary, Waimea Heights.

Schools with access to Taroona High School: Campbell Street, Goulburn Street, Lansdowne Crescent, Mount Stuart (this is to ensure that students whose neighbourhood high schools are single sex schools also have access to a coeducational school).

== History ==
Lobbying for a high school south of Hobart to take students from Sandy Bay, Taroona, and the Channel district happened in 1952. The school opened in 1958.

Funds from the Commonwealth Government were made available in 1968 to construct new science laboratories.

Nine students were hurt and hospitalized after an explosion following a reaction of sodium with water on 2 May 1985.

On 3 July 1990 two students and a teacher from the school drowned in Mystery Creek Cave near Lune River.

A new technology and design centre opened in 1995.

After someone started a fire with paper towels in the boys toilet, A block had to be evacuated on 9 October 2008.

== Related organisations ==
There is a Taroona High School Council, Student Representative Council, Parents and Friends Association, Parents Auxiliary and Old Scholars Association. Taroona High School Association Inc.

== Geography and geology ==
Taroona High School is located in Taroona on the shore of the River Derwent. A small sandy beach on the northeast side is called Dixons Beach. A creek runs in a north east direction north of the buildings and main oval, and meets the sea between the car park and the archery field. This is called School Creek. To the south of the school campus is its access road, Meath Avenue and Melinga Place. The rock beneath the school is Paleogene sandstone and conglomerate. A boulder bed formed in the Paleogene makes up the point. A bed of tuff just to the south of A block heads east-northeast to the coast and southwest inland. The whole region north from Belhaven Avenue to School Creek is unstable ground undergoing a slow moving landslide called "School Creek Landslide". This started hundreds of years ago before there were any buildings constructed. Movement to the northwest is happening, the tennis court moved about 40 mm in 11 years, and a survey marker near the road entrance has shifted 0.4 m since 1961. Several smaller landslips are parasitic or nearby. These are the Archery Field Landslip, north of the creek; the Dixons Beach Landslip and Carpark Landslip which moved a couple of metres in the late 1980s; and Channel Highway Landslip between the Channel Highway and the primary school. The soil in the area is highly reactive expanding and contracting with changes in water content. The situation is being monitored with a real time inclinometer, and a vibrating wire piezometer, as well as survey markers and a GPS station to see where the school moves.

== Headmasters and principals ==
- Bernard Mitchell 1958–1959
- N. H. Campbell 1960–1965
- Don Lennox 1966–1971
- C. R. O. (Ray) Barnfield 1972-1974
- Graham Clements 1974–1989
- Jan Baker 1991–1993
- Greg Cairnduff -1997
- Tony McKenny 1997–1998
- Robin Fox 1999–2003
- Brendan Kelly 2003–2006
- David Hamlett 2007–2011
- John O'Rourke 2012–2016
- Karena Gregory (acting) 2016–2017
- Mathew Bennell 2017–2021
- Susan Flinn (acting) 2022
- Charles White 2022-

== Notable alumni ==
- Eric Abetz, politician, former Senator for Tasmania, representing the Liberals
- David Bartlett, politician, former Premier of Tasmania, representing Labor
- Mark Burrows journalist
- Mary Donaldson, Queen of Denmark
- Stephanie Grant judoka olympian
- Darrin Pritchard footballer
- Michael Seddon footballer
- Rob Valentine, former Lord Mayor of Hobart and current independent Member of the Tasmanian Legislative Council
- Justin Denholm, Current director of the Victorian tuberculosis program

Rhodes scholars from Taroona High include Michael Buchanan (1989), Rhys Edwards (1992), Jessica Radford (2004), Abishek Sharma (2005), Alex Shabala (2008), Robert Hortle (2014), Bede Jones (2016), and Brook Dambacher (2019).

== See also ==
- List of schools in Tasmania
- Education in Tasmania
