= Taroona Beach =

Suburban beach in Taroona, Tasmania

- Beach
- Location within Hobart
- Coordinates: 42°57′09″S 147°21′07″E
- Location: Taroona, Hobart, Tasmania, Australia
- Water bodies: River Derwent

Dimensions
  - Length: 500 metres (1,600 ft)
- Hazard rating: 3/10
- Access: Taroona Crescent, Niree Parade, Taroona Foreshore Track

Taroona Beach is a popular beach destination along the River Derwent in Taroona, Hobart, Tasmania. The south facing beach looks directly out to Storm Bay and the Tasman Sea, with views of the Derwent estuary, the City of Clarence on the eastern shore, Opossum Bay, South Arm, the Alum Cliffs and northern tip of Bruny Island. Taroona Beach is situated between Hinsby Beach and Crayfish Point, home of the Fisheries and Aquaculture Centre for the Institute for Marine and Antarctic Studies. Taroona Beach contains a boat ramp and is backed by Taroona Park which contains bathroom facilities, a skate park, scout hall, the Taroona Tennis Club, and the Taroona Bowls and Community Club.

== History ==
Taroona Beach has historically been a popular staple of local activity, used for exercise, beach combing, kayaking, sailing, snorkelling, bodyboarding and swimming. Prior to the British colonisation of Tasmania, the land had been occupied for possibly as long as 35,000 years by the semi-nomadic Mouheneener people, a sub-group of the Nuennone, or "South-East tribe". The name Taroona is derived from the Mouheneener word for chiton, a marine mollusc found on rocks in the intertidal regions of Taroona Beach. Mouheneener shell middens can be found scattered all along Taroona's foreshores.

On 28 January 1810, a young sailor named Joseph Batchelor died onboard the vessel Venus incoming from India. Batchelor was brought ashore and buried at Taroona Beach; his is reputed to be the oldest European grave in Tasmania. Batchelor's Grave was a declared historical site by the Tasmanian Heritage Register on 21 March 1978. A reenactment of Batchelor's body being brought to Taroona Beach was carried out to mark the 200th anniversary of the sailor's burial on Thursday 28th January 2010.

During her time as a resident of Taroona, poet Gwen Harwood wrote popular beachside poems including At the Water's Edge, Last Meeting and Estuary which contain vivid descriptions of Taroona Beach and surrounds.

Horseriding on Taroona Beach was banned in 1950. In 1952, the Kingborough Council requested financial aid from the Australian Government to build a swimming bath at Taroona beach as a means to protect children from sharks, although this never eventuated.

In 2018, the eastern section of the beach became an off-leash dog zone.

== Marine life ==
The mouth of the River Derwent leading to Storm Bay was a major calving ground of the southern right whale (Eubalaena australis) until the 19th century when whaling in Australia became a lucrative industry. Southern right whales display strong maternal fidelity to their calving grounds, and their numbers were so great that early settlers complained that sounds of cavorting whales kept them awake at night. In July 1804, clergyman Robert Knopwood claimed that in crossing the River Derwent, "we passed so many whales that it was dangerous for the boat to go up the river unless you kept very near the shore". By the 1890s southern right whales had been brought to the brink of extinction, with over 25,000 recorded whales killed in Australia and New Zealand. The whaling industry ended in Tasmania in 1900. Southern right whales have only intermittently made appearances in the Derwent estuary since, during months in winter and spring when their migration takes place. In 2010, a southern right whale gave birth to a calf in the River Derwent just off the shore near Taroona Beach, the first birth recording in the estuary in approximately 190 years.

A large Wedgenose skate (Dipturus whitleyi) weighing 187 pounds (85 kg) was caught off Taroona Beach in 1952.

In the winter months of 2014, humpback whales (Megaptera novaeangliae) and a minke whale (Balaenoptera bonaerensis) (being the first confirmed record of this species in the river) were recorded feeding in the River Derwent for the first time since the 1800s.

Other marine life sighted from Taroona Beach include the Australian swellshark (Cephaloscyllium laticeps), bottlenose dolphins (Tursiops aduncus) and Burrunan dolphins (Tursiops aduncus australis), southern rock lobster (Jasus edwardsii) and the rare spotted handfish (Brachionichthys hirsutus), whose only habitat is in the Derwent estuary and surrounds.

Caused by microscopic plankton, a bioluminescence phenomenon intermittently occurs in the beach's waters in the evening.

== Environment ==
The steep and narrow 500-metre (1,600 ft) beach has waves averaging .5 metres (1 ft 8 in) swells and is bookended by clusters of large boulder rocks. The beach can be viewed from beachside homes along Niree Parade. Taroona Park contains native flora including Tasmanian blue gum (Eucalyptus globulus subsp. globulus), black gum (Eucalyptus aggregata), sheoak (Casuarinaceae), Tasmanian Blackwood (Acacia melanoxylon), hopbush, banksia, coast wattle, and saltbush.

== Access ==
Taroona Beach is accessible from the Hobart City Centre via the Channel Highway. It is a two hour walk from the CBD, or a 25 minute metro bus ride. There is dedicated parking at the beach directly off Niree Parade and at Taroona Park. The beach can be accessed on foot via the Taroona Foreshore Track.
