= Blackmans Bay, Tasmania =

Blackmans Bay
- Suburb
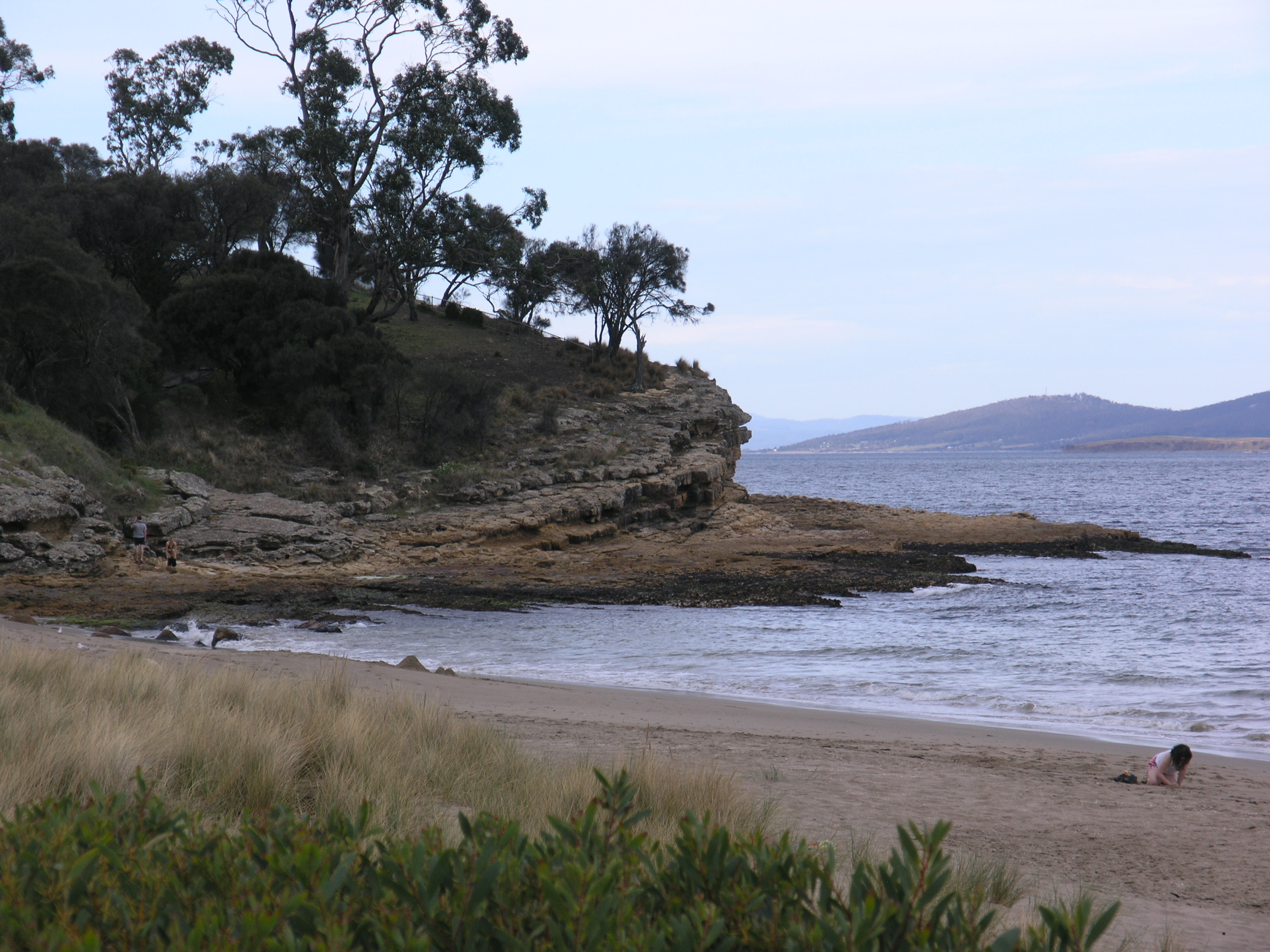
- North end of Blackmans Bay Beach in 2008

- Interactive map of Blackmans Bay
- Coordinates: 42°59′56″S 147°19′8″E
- Country: Australia
- State: Tasmania
- City: Hobart
- LGA: Kingborough
- Location: 4 km (2.5 mi) from Kingston; 17 km (11 mi) from Hobart; 33 km (21 mi) from Hobart Airport

Government
  - State electorates: Franklin; Nelson; Huon
  - Federal division: Franklin

Population
  - Total: 7,688 (2021 census)
- Postcode: 7052
Suburbs around Blackmans Bay
Maranoa Heights	Kingston Beach
Huntingfield	Blackmans Bay	River Derwent
Howden	Tinderbox

Blackmans Bay is a coastal suburb of Kingborough Council, Tasmania, Australia. It forms part of the Kingston-Blackmans Bay urban area and is a satellite town of Greater Hobart. It borders Kingston Beach to the north, Maranoa Heights and the Peter Murrell Conservation Area to the west, and Howden and Tinderbox to the south.

== Etymology ==
Blackmans Bay is named after James Blackman, who occupied land there in the 1820s. Another Blackman Bay, near Dunalley, was so named in 1642 because of the presence of Aboriginal Tasmanians.

== Geography ==
Blackmans Bay is located on the hills surrounding a popular sandy beach, known as Blackmans Bay Beach, situated on the River Derwent.

There is a blowhole near the northern end of the Blackmans Bay Beach, which has eroded and forms a large rock arch, where waves can be seen entering and crashing on the rocks. James Baynton is credited with the discovery of the blowhole when he found his lost dog whimpering at its base.

At the southern end of the beach are rocks leading to Flowerpot Point, a popular spot for fishing, although snags are an issue because of the prevalence of seaweed and rock ledges beneath the water. Beyond Flowerpot Point lies a quiet pebble beach that is accessible at low tide. The Suncoast Headlands Walking Track leads south via clifftops, overlooking Flowerpot Point, to Soldiers Rocks, a dog exercise area, and a bushland loop walking track.

At the southern boundary of the suburb lies Fossil Cove, accessible via a steep walking track from Fossil Cove Drive.

== Infrastructure ==
Blackmans Bay is serviced by two government primary schools, offering kindergarten to grade six, Blackmans Bay Primary School and Illawarra Primary School. Both are often used as a polling place. The area is also serviced by St Aloysius Catholic College, a private catholic school offering kindergarten to grade four at their primary campus, located adjacent to the border of Kingston Beach and Blackmans Bay, on the Kingston Beach side. The closest government high school is Kingston High School in Kingston. There are independent primary and secondary schools in neighbouring areas. Calvin Christian School and Southern Christian College are in Kingston, and Tarremah Steiner School and the secondary campuses of St Aloysius Catholic College are in Huntingfield.

There is a shopping plaza located centrally within the suburb, which includes a Hill Street Grocer, combined Australia Post post office and newsagent, doctor's surgery, pharmacy, and a variety of other small businesses. There are also a number of child care centres and a petrol station. Blackmans Bay also has a Scout hall and a Girl Guide hall.

The esplanade at Blackmans Bay Beach has a playground, public toilets and three restaurants. There is also a community hall, skate park, and another playground nearby.

Blackmans Bay is connected to Hobart by Algona Road, the Kingston Bypass, and the Southern Outlet. Algona Road also connects the area to the Channel Highway and Huntingfield. Blackmans Bay has direct bus services to Kingston, Hobart, and Glenorchy, operated by Metro Tasmania.

== History ==
The 1830 Ross Almanack describes Blackmans Bay as "[...] several small farms. It is a very romantically situated little settlement with a fine sandy beach in front. The potatoes that grow there are as celebrated as those of Brown's River." The only families referenced in the text are the Mansfields and the Lovetts. The signal station "Mount Lewis" is said to be located next to the Lovett household.

Despite knowledge of the Bay's existence it was settled relatively late, and by 1842 only four or five families lived in the area. The road from Hobart reached Brown's River and ended in Kingston Beach, with only a sandy track over the hill connecting Kingston Beach and Blackmans Bay. One of the earliest settlers was William Sherburd who was granted 50 acres there in 1818, which he started farming in 1819. The existing oval at Blackmans Bay bears Sherburd's name.

Blackmans Bay did not develop as quickly as Brown's River or Kingston Beach, as the lack of a road or jetty made it difficult to access. Therefore, the area enjoyed little development between 1830 and 1880, with farmland growth but little change in population. There were still few residents by the 1930s, with only the following six families listed as residing in the area: Ranger, Parson, Ayres, Sherburd, Chamberlain and Keeble. The area enjoyed greater growth during the post-war period. At the beginning of 1947 there were 57 families in the area, and by the end of the year there were 343.

== Climate ==
Climate data for Blackmans Bay
Month	Jan	Feb	Mar	Apr	May	Jun	Jul	Aug	Sep	Oct	Nov	Dec	Year
Mean daily maximum °C (°F)	22.0 (71.6)	21.4 (70.5)	20.2 (68.4)	17.8 (64.0)	15.0 (59.0)	13.0 (55.4)	12.6 (54.7)	13.1 (55.6)	15.0 (59.0)	16.7 (62.1)	18.4 (65.1)	20.3 (68.5)	17.1 (62.8)
Mean daily minimum °C (°F)	13.5 (56.3)	13.1 (55.6)	10.4 (50.7)	10.4 (50.7)	8.5 (47.3)	7.1 (44.8)	6.4 (43.5)	6.2 (43.2)	7.7 (45.9)	8.7 (47.7)	10.2 (50.4)	11.8 (53.2)	9.7 (49.5)
Average precipitation mm (inches)	32.6 (1.28)	29.4 (1.16)	43.6 (1.72)	33.8 (1.33)	51.5 (2.03)	51.5 (2.03)	43.9 (1.73)	53 (2.1)	38.5 (1.52)	55.4 (2.18)	46.2 (1.82)	43.7 (1.72)	530.6 (20.89)
Source: https://www.eldersweather.com.au/climate-history/tas/blackmans-bay
