= Hinsby Beach =

Suburban beach in Taroona, Tasmania

- Beach
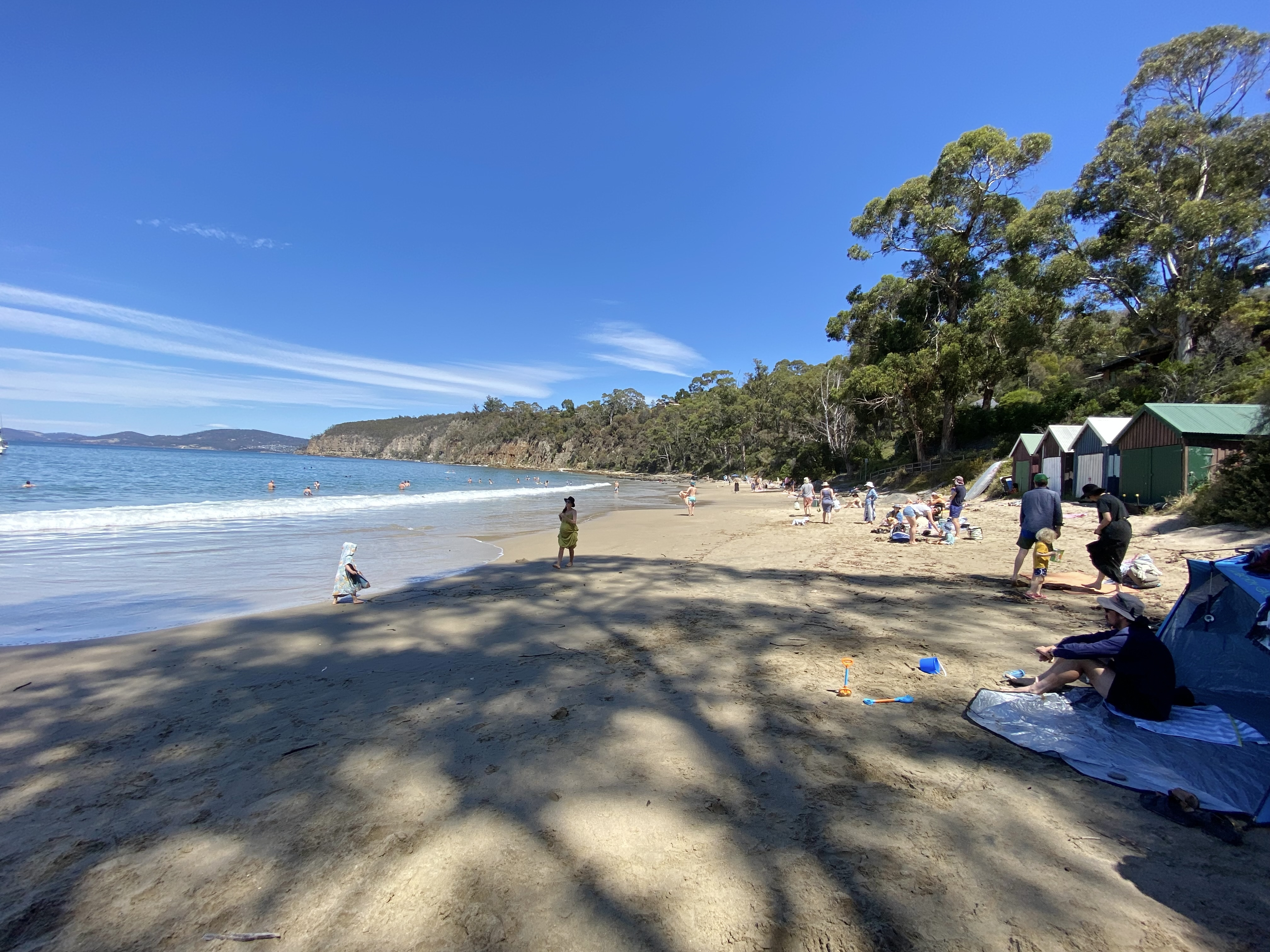

- Location within Hobart
- Coordinates: 42°57′12.86″S 147°20′46.17″E
- Location: Taroona, Hobart, Tasmania, Australia
- Water bodies: River Derwent

Dimensions
  - Length: 250 metres (820 ft)
- Hazard rating: 3/10
- Access: Jenkins Street, Hinsby Road, Taroona Foreshore Track

Hinsby Beach is a beach along the River Derwent in the Hobart suburb of Taroona, Australia. The south facing beach looks directly out to Storm Bay and the Tasman Sea, with views of the Derwent estuary, the Alum Cliffs, Taroona Shot Tower, the City of Clarence on the eastern shore and Opossum Bay, South Arm. Hinsby Beach is situated between the Alum Cliffs and Taroona Beach. A naturally secluded section of the beach, beyond the rocky south-western outcrop is a zoned naturist beach.

== History ==
Hinsby Beach has historically been a popular staple of local activity, used for exercise, beach combing, kayaking, sailing, snorkelling, bodyboarding and swimming. Prior to the British colonisation of Tasmania, the land had been occupied for possibly as long as 35,000 years by the semi-nomadic Mouheneener people, a sub-group of the Nuennone, or "South-East tribe". Mouheneener shell middens can be found scattered all along Taroona's foreshores.

Extreme weather hit the beach in 2018, causing rough seas to wash salmon farming equipment ashore and the escape of 120,000 atlantic salmon.

In 2021, Hinsby Beach was utilised for MONA FOMA celebrations with an installation called Hobart Digs, in which south sea pearls encased in handcrafted boxes by German artist Michael Sailstorfer were buried in the sand and discovered by participants.

== Environment ==
The steep and narrow 250-metre (820 ft) beach has waves averaging .5 metres (1 ft 8 in) swells and is bookended by a 50-metre (160 ft) collection of boulder rocks at Taroona Beach and the Alum Cliffs, which emerge from sea level to heights between 50–100 metres (160–330 ft) to create a dramatic coastline, stretching for 2 kilometres (1.2 mi) to Tyndall Beach, Kingston Beach. The beach can be viewed from beachside homes along Hinsby Road. Hinsby Beach performs well for water quality within the Derwent estuary for swimming.

== Access ==
Hinsby Beach is accessible from the Hobart City Centre via the Channel Highway. It is a two-hour walk from the CBD, or a 30-minute metro bus ride. There is parking at nearby Jenkins Street, Hinsby Road, Niree Parade and at Taroona Park. The beach can be accessed on foot via the Taroona Foreshore Track.

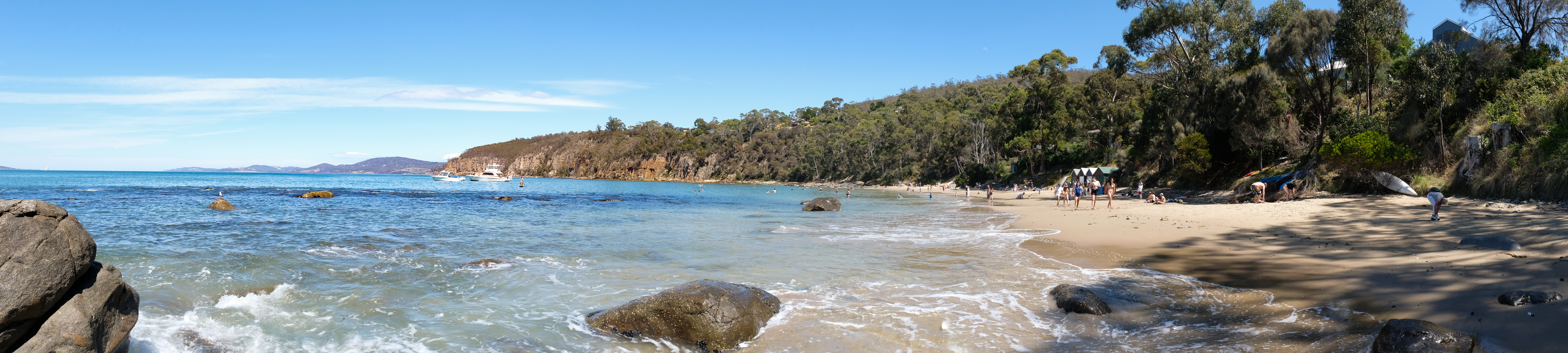
Panorama of Hinsby Beach at Taroona

== See also ==
- List of social nudity places in Oceania
