= Firthside =

- Suburb
- Interactive map of Firthside
- Coordinates: 42°57′57″S 147°18′28″E
- Country: Australia
- State: Tasmania
- City: Hobart
- LGA: Kingborough Council

Government
  - Federal division: Franklin, Denison
- Postcode: 7053
Suburbs around Firthside
Firthside	Bonnet Hill
Kingston	Kingston Beach

Firthside is a neighbourhood within the suburb of Kingston, in the greater Hobart area, capital of Tasmania, Australia. It is located on the northern edge of the Kingston urban area.

The Firthside area was originally settled by Dutch migrants.
