= Kingston Beach =

- Suburb
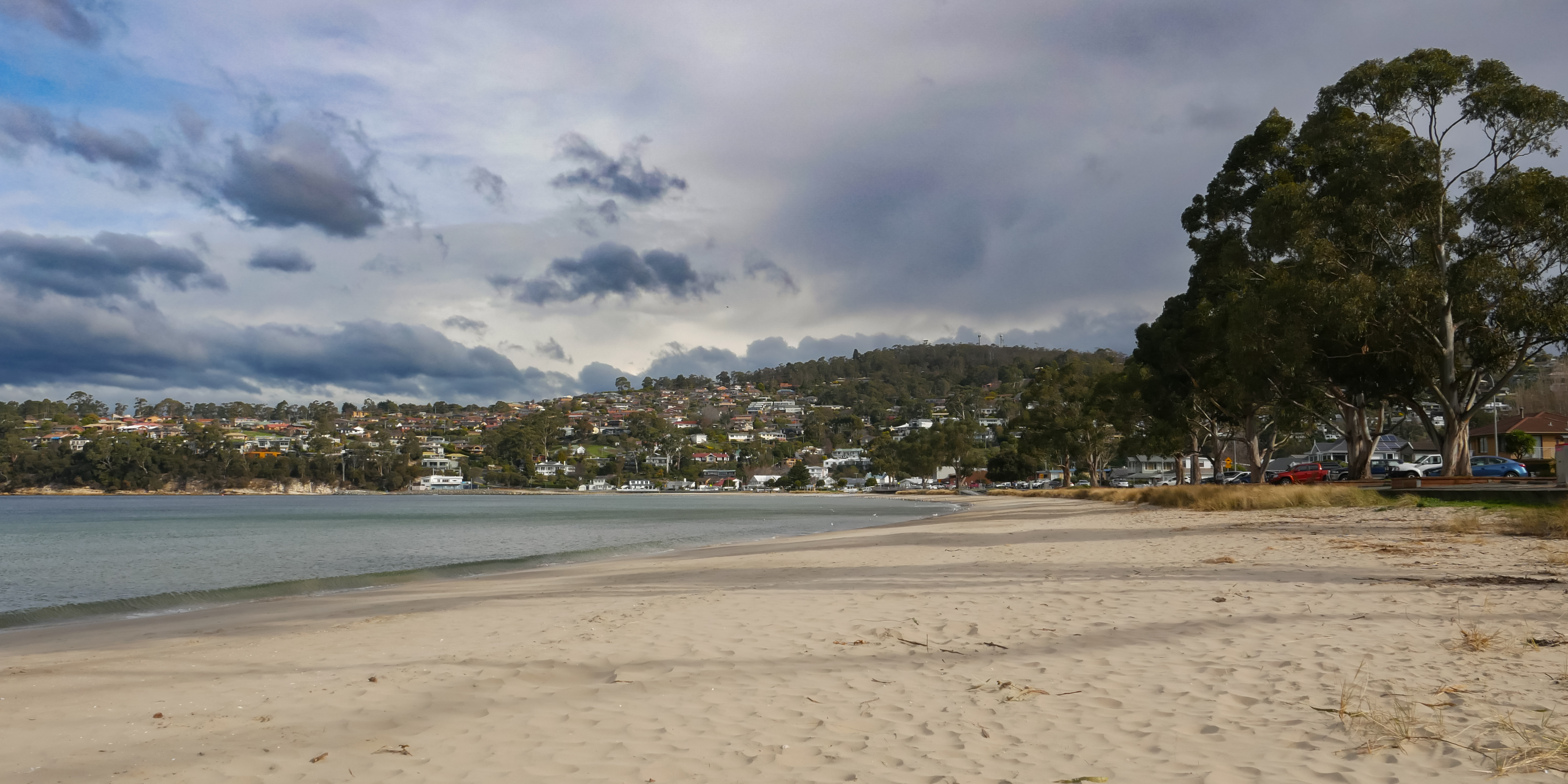

- Interactive map of Kingston Beach
- Coordinates: 42°58′52″S 147°19′22″E
- Country: Australia
- State: Tasmania
- Region: Hobart
- City: Hobart
- LGA: Kingborough
- Location: 2 km (1.2 mi) SE of Kingston

Government
  - Federal division: Franklin

Population
  - Total: 2,305 (2021 census)
- Postcode: 7050
Suburbs around Kingston Beach
Firthside	Bonnet Hill	River Derwent
Kingston	Kingston Beach	River Derwent
Maranoa Heights	Blackmans Bay	River Derwent

Kingston Beach is a residential locality in the local government area (LGA) of Kingborough in the Hobart LGA region of Tasmania. The locality is about 2 kilometres (1.2 mi) south-east of the town of Kingston. The 2021 census recorded a population of 2305 for the state suburb of Kingston Beach.

It is a suburb of the greater Hobart area. It is located on the River Derwent at the mouth of Browns Rivulet. It was originally known as Browns River Beach in the 1850s. Kingston Beach was a regularly photographed location in the twentieth century.

The beach is patrolled by Kingston Beach Surf Life Saving Club between the months of December and April. Other facilities include a dog beach, bike park, barbecue area, sailing club, playgrounds and various shops. The local Progress Association served between 1925 and 1992, known as either the Kingston Beach Progress Association, Kingston Beach Regatta Association, or the Kingston Beach Progress and Regatta Association.

== History ==
Kingston Beach was gazetted as a locality in 1960.

== Geography ==
The waters of the River Derwent estuary form the eastern boundary. Beginning at Tyndall Beach, the Alum Cliffs stretch through the neighbouring suburb of Bonnet Hill to Hinsby Beach at Taroona.

== Road infrastructure ==
Route B68 (Channel Highway) passes to the north-west. From there, several roads provide access to the locality.
