= Howden, Tasmania =

Howden
- Suburb
- Interactive map of Howden
- Coordinates: 43°01′36″S 147°17′34″E
- Country: Australia
- State: Tasmania
- LGA: Kingborough
- Location: 21 km (13 mi) S of Hobart

Government
  - State electorate: Franklin
  - Federal division: Franklin

Population
  - Total: 717 (2021 census)
- Time zone: UTC+10 (AEST)
  - Summer (DST): UTC+11 (AEDT)
- Postcode: 7054
Suburbs around Howden
Huntingfield	Maranoa Heights	Blackmans Bay
Margate	Howden	Blackmans Bay
		Tinderbox

Howden, a suburb of Hobart, is a small, isolated community on the shore of North West Bay in Tasmania Australia. It is situated between the developing township of Kingston and the smaller Margate, it borders bushland and is located 21 kilometres (13 mi) south of Hobart, the capital city of Tasmania.

== Location and features ==
Howden is located five minutes' walk from the waterfronts of Stinkpot Bay and North West Bay. Lapwings, seagulls, black and white cockatoos, and ducks are all found in Howden. Many birds live in and around the Peter Murrell Conservation Area.

At the end of the local Wingara Road, the Howden foreshore is accessible at low tides.

The rocky shoreline attracts many bird species and supports a wide variety of intertidal reef species that are visible in rock pools, such as Pacific oysters and Shore crabs.

The area is hilly with a suburban housing style.

== See also ==
- List of Hobart suburbs
- Howden 2021 Census - Australian Bureau of Statistics
