= Parent-controlled school =

Type of private school

A parent-controlled school is a type of private school in which significant power is vested in the parents of students, usually through an association. Many parent-controlled schools are Christian schools, but do not usually have a denominational affiliation.

In Australia, the first Christian parent-controlled school was Calvin Christian School in Kingston, Tasmania, established in 1962. Christian Education National (formerly Christian Parent Controlled Schools) represents eighty such schools around the country.

Christian parent-controlled schools are driven by a belief that parents have been "given a responsibility by God for their children's upbringing and education."

== See also ==
- Parental rights movement – Movement advocating against sex education and LGBT pronoun usage in schools
