= Taroona =

- Suburb
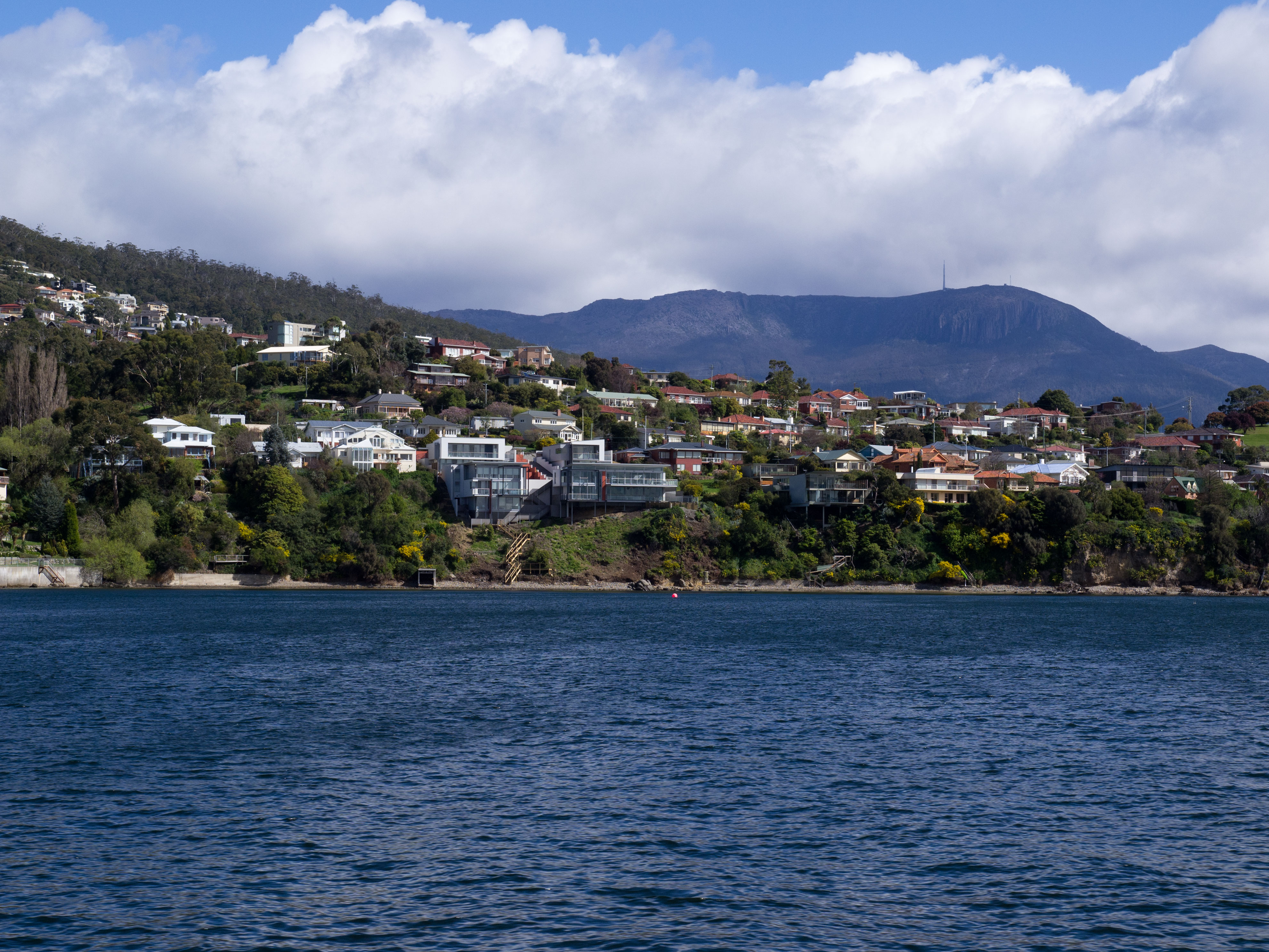

- Interactive map of Taroona
- Coordinates: 42°56′53″S 147°20′56″E
- Country: Australia
- State: Tasmania
- City: Hobart
- LGA: Kingborough

Government
  - State electorate: Clark
  - Federal division: Clark

Population
  - Total: 3,070 (2016 census)
- Postcode: 7053
Suburbs around Taroona
Mount Nelson	Sandy Bay	River Derwent
	Taroona	River Derwent
	Bonnet Hill	River Derwent

Taroona is a residential suburb in Hobart, Tasmania, Australia, on the route between the Hobart City Centre and Kingston. Although on the edges of the City of Hobart, Taroona is actually part of the municipality of Kingborough. Taroona is bounded on the east by the River Derwent, and has several beaches along the shore. The main beaches with public access are Taroona Beach, Hinsby Beach and Dixons Beach. Past Hinsby Beach, the Alum Cliffs form a section of cliffed coast to the neighbouring suburb of Bonnet Hill.

== Name ==
The name Taroona is derived from the Mouheneener word for chiton, a marine mollusc found on rocks in the intertidal regions of the Taroona foreshore.

== History ==
=== Traditional owners ===
Prior to the British colonisation of Tasmania, the land had been occupied for possibly as long as 35,000 years by the semi-nomadic Mouheneener people, a sub-group of the Nuennone, or "South-East tribe". Mouheneener shell middens can be found scattered all along Taroona's foreshores.

=== European settlement ===
This district was originally known as Crayfish Point and the diaries of Robert Knopwood contain reference to expeditions to catch crayfish there.

The first European settlement at Taroona took place in the early 19th century, when land was granted to settlers who had relocated from Norfolk Island. For the remainder of that century, the area was largely used for farming, and was sparsely populated.

In the mid-1890s, Clarendon James Cox Lord purchased an 18-acre property which he called Taroona, after an Aboriginal word for sea shell. Lord built himself a pretty homestead and also established tea rooms where visitors could indulge in delicacies such as strawberries and cream while overlooking the River Derwent, Hobart.

In the first half of the 20th century, more large and elegant residences were built, as well as beach shacks and cottages which were used for seaside holidays by the residents of Hobart. Taroona Post Office opened on 2 August 1906.

At the northern end of Taroona Beach, just above the foreshore, there is the grave of a young sailor and First Officer, Jas. Batchelor, who died on the schooner Venus in the Derwent Estuary in 1810, and was buried ashore on 28 January 1810. It is the oldest known European grave in Tasmania, and was declared an historic site by the Australian Heritage Commission on 21 March 1978.

After World War II, significant subdivision of Taroona was undertaken, and the suburb's population rapidly expanded. Having been developed mainly in the "era of the automobile", Taroona was, from the beginning, a commuter suburb, and it has a notable absence of commercial or retail premises, with many of the early retail enterprises having lost the battle with larger supermarkets elsewhere.

=== 1967 bushfires ===
In February 1967, southern Tasmania was engulfed in the most vicious wildfires on record, resulting in many deaths. Taroona was the closest suburb to the city of Hobart to take the full brunt of the fires, which swept across the suburb in the mid afternoon wreaking havoc and destroying many homes. Children and residents fled to the river, and many people's survival was due to the refuge the safe waters provided.

== Education ==
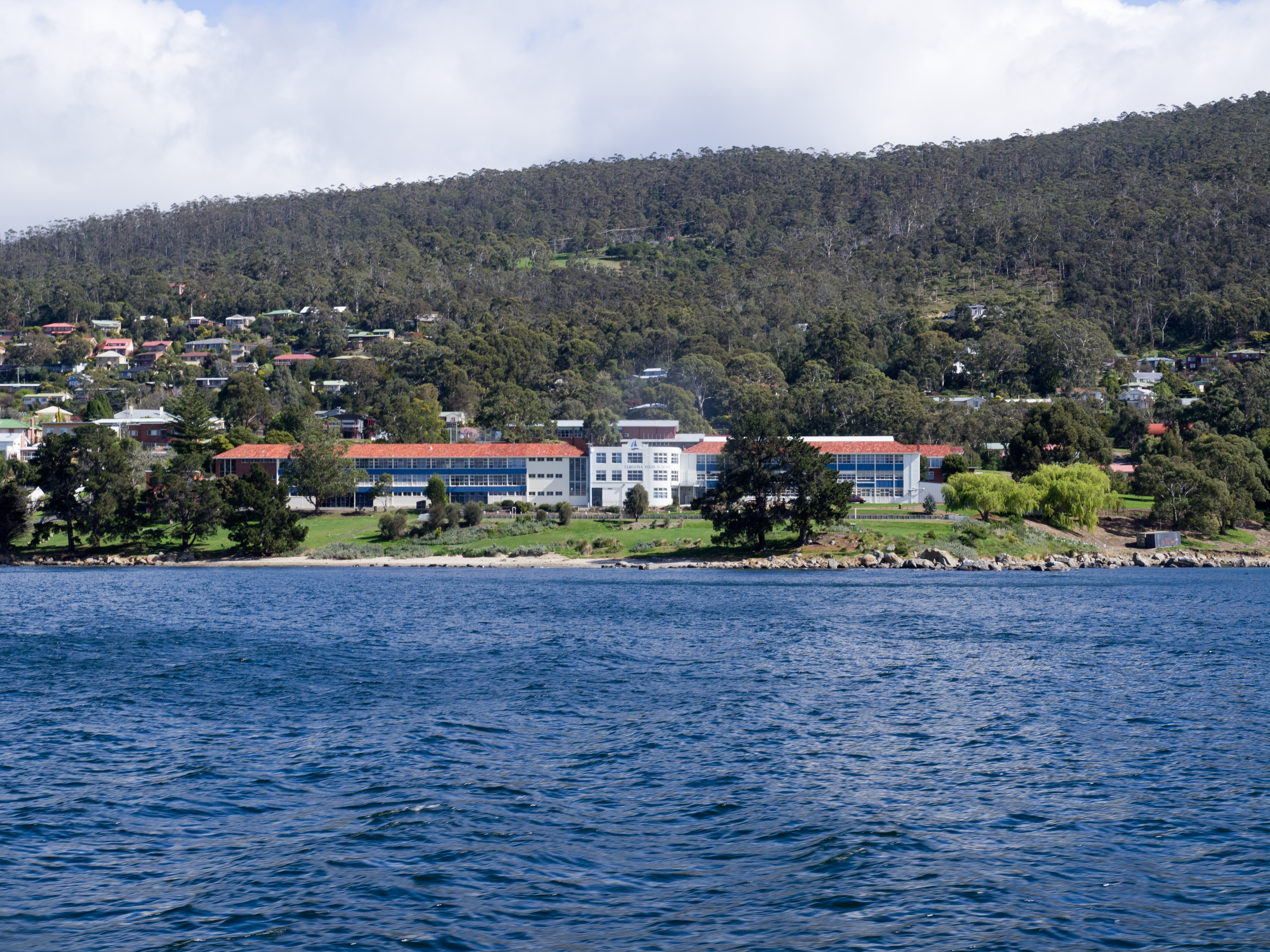
Taroona High School

In 1958, a public high school was established on a large parcel of land on the Channel Highway central to the suburb, and with a frontage on the foreshore of the River Derwent.

In 1960, the Taroona Primary School re-located to the same site, from an older building further south on the Channel Highway. Those original primary school buildings were adapted for kindergarten and pre-school, but were burnt down by an arsonist in 1974. The kindergarten and pre-school were subsequently re-built adjacent to the primary school.

Taroona High School and Taroona Primary school are completely separate educational institutions, although they do share one oval.

Originally, the high school catered for grades 7 to 11, but with the establishment of the separate Matriculation College system in 1962, the grade 11 students were transferred to the Hobart Matriculation College. At its maximum in the 1960s, the enrolments at Taroona High School were about 1200, with students travelling from Ferntree, South Hobart, Sandy Bay, Battery Point, Kingston, Blackmans Bay, and several centres further south.

There are now approximately 1150 students in high school, now only drawing students from the southern suburbs of Hobart. The current principal is Matthew Bennell.

== Notable persons ==
Taroona was the childhood home of Tasmanian-born Queen Mary of Denmark, who attended the river-side Taroona High School before completing her high schooling at Mount Nelson's Hobart College and embarking on her tertiary degree at the University of Tasmania.

In the arts, lead vocalist of The Seekers Judith Durham (born Judith Mavis Cock, 3 July 1943) lived in Taroona as a young girl, and attended the Fahan School in Sandy Bay before moving back to Melbourne in 1956. She joined The Seekers in 1963. Gwen Harwood, a poet and librettist, lived in Taroona with her family for a number of years in the 1950s. Louise Lovely, Australia's first actress to achieve fame in Hollywood, spent her later years in Taroona until her death in 1980.

David Bartlett, a former Tasmanian premier (2008), was also raised in Taroona.

== Shot Tower ==
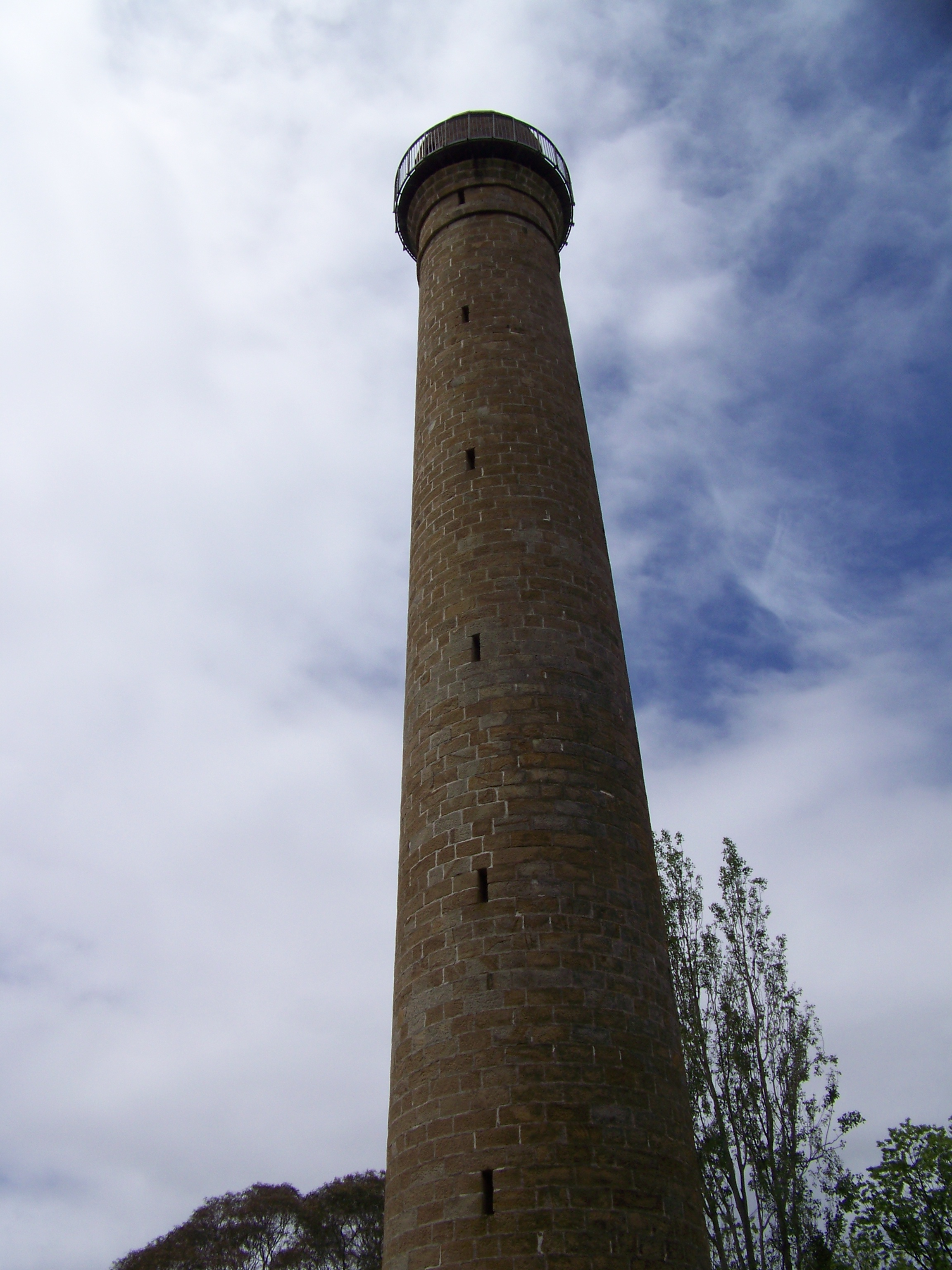
The Taroona shot tower

Situated on the Channel Highway just south of Taroona is one of the State's most unusual historic buildings, the Shot Tower. The Shot Tower is 48 metres (157 ft) tall and 10 metres (33 ft) wide, and was constructed in a cylindrical shape by Joseph Moir in 1870 from locally quarried sandstone blocks. Lead shot was made by dropping molten lead through a sieve at the top of the tower, and by the time it hit the water at the bottom, it was cold and spherical in shape. A climb up the 259 steps to the top of the tower gives a scenic view of the Derwent Estuary.
