= Huntingfield =

Huntingfield is the name of a number of places.

- Huntingfield, Suffolk, England.
- Huntingfield, Tasmania, Australia
