= Tinderbox, Tasmania =

Tinderbox
- Town
- Coordinates: 43°02′14″S 147°19′22″E
- Country: Australia
- State: Tasmania
- Region: Hobart
- LGA: Kingborough
- Location: 13 km (8.1 mi) S of Kingston

Government
  - State electorate: Franklin, Clark
  - Federal division: Franklin, Clark

Population
  - Total: 394 (2016 census)
- Postcode: 7054
Localities around Tinderbox
North-West Bay	Howden, Blackmans Bay	River Derwent
North-West Bay	Tinderbox	River Derwent
North-West Bay	D'Entrecasteaux Channel	River Derwent

Tinderbox is a rural residential locality in the local government area of Kingborough in the Hobart region of Tasmania. It is located about 13 kilometres (8.1 mi) south of the town of Kingston. The 2016 census recorded a population of 394 for the state suburb of Tinderbox. Tinderbox is also part of the Greater Hobart statistical area.

== History ==
Tinderbox was gazetted as a locality in 1961. The locality is said to be named after a sterling silver tinderbox found on the beach in the 1830s.

a silver tinderbox inscribed in French, an indication that some thirty years before early French expeditioners, perhaps with Baudin, maybe with Bruny D’Entrecasteaux, had visited this beach

== Geography ==
North-West Bay forms the western boundary, D'Entrecasteaux Channel the southern, and the River Derwent the eastern.

== Road infrastructure ==
The C624 route (Tinderbox Road) enters from the north and runs south-west, south, east and north, thus completing almost a complete loop of the locality before exiting in the north-east.
