= Maranoa Heights =

- Suburb
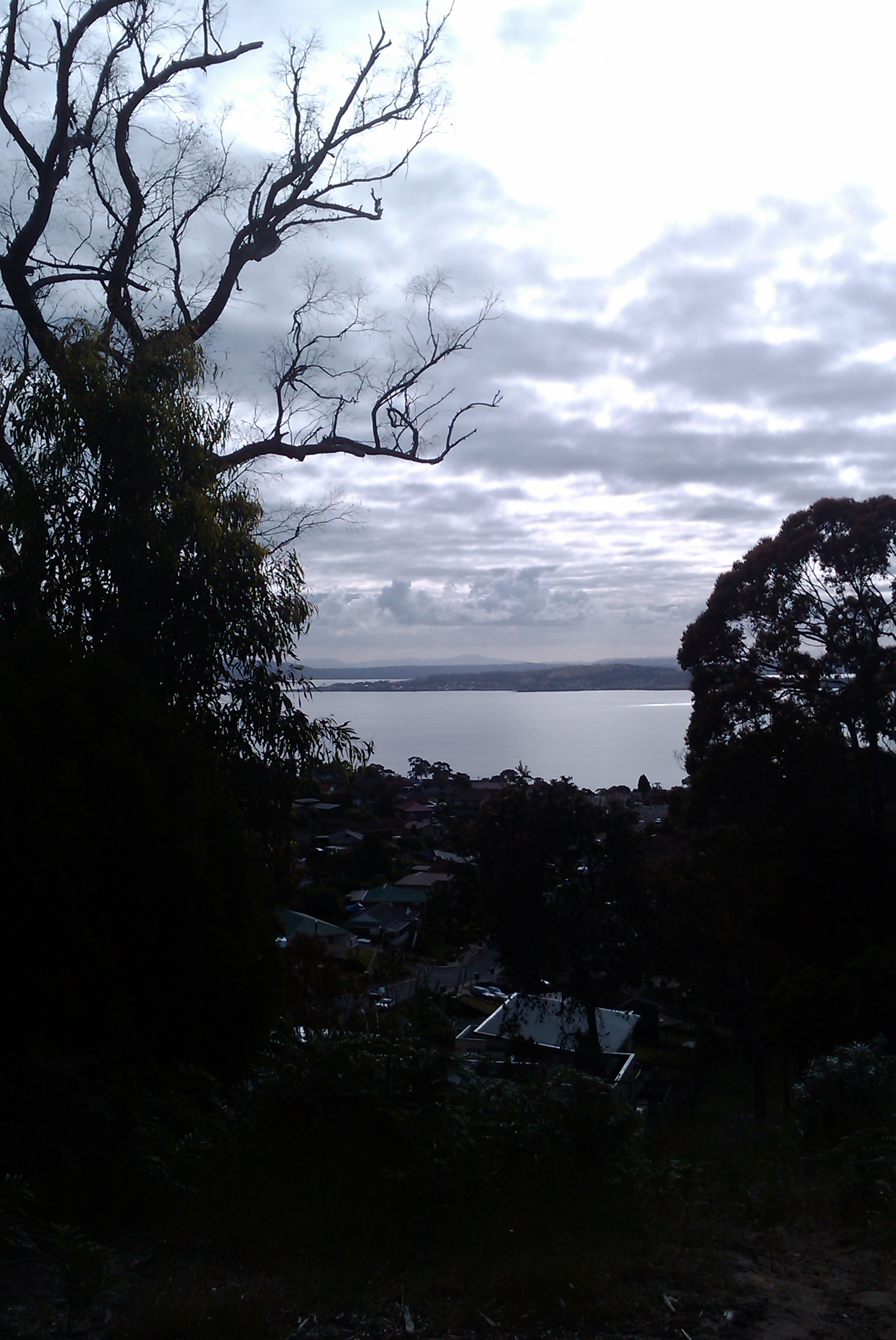
- Blackmans Bay from Maranoa Heights

- Interactive map of Maranoa Heights
- Coordinates: 42°59′32″S 147°18′28″E
- Country: Australia
- State: Tasmania
- City: Hobart
- LGA: Kingborough
- Postcode: 7050
Suburbs around Maranoa Heights
Kingston	Kingston	Kingston Beach
Huntingfield	Maranoa Heights	Blackmans Bay
Howden		Blackmans Bay

Maranoa Heights is a residential neighbourhood of the suburb of Kingston in the greater Hobart area of Tasmania, Australia. It is largely within the southern part of the area contained by the B68 Channel Highway, the C628 Roslyn Avenue and Algona Road. Maranoa Heights contains large areas of recreational woodland accessed by walking tracks and overlooks the coastal suburbs of Kingston Beach and Blackmans Bay. Maranoa Heights is home to the Boronia Hill Flora Track.

== History ==
Development of the Maranoa Heights region can be traced to around 1950 when Dutch migrants settled in the region. Maranoa Heights developed further after the 1967 bushfires laid waste to much of region bordering the D'Entrecasteaux Channel and many of the resident apple farmers were forced to sell their land to property developers, among them the Dutch families of Pinkster, Vanderlaan and Laning.

In 1969, the opening of the Southern Outlet linked Hobart to the rest of Southern Tasmania. Prior to this, the population of Kingston numbered around 1000 people centred on Kingston Beach but with the development of Maranoa Heights the population of Kingston now numbers around 28,000.
