= Channel Court =

Shopping center in Tasmania, Australia

Channel Court Shopping Centre
- Location: Kingston, Tasmania
- Coordinates: 42°58′37.71″S 147°18′33.85″E
- Address: 29 Channel Highway
- Opened: 1967
- Owner: Behrakis Group
- Num. of stores: 21 or more
- Num. of anchor tenants: 2
- Floors: 2 or 3
- Website: www.channelcourt.com.au

Channel Court is a sub regional shopping centre located on the Channel Highway, Kingston, Hobart, Tasmania. Comprising an indoor outdoor complex, and standalone facilities, the centre is primarily anchored by Tasmania's largest Big W and a Woolworths supermarket, as well as Tasmania's only KaiserCraft store. The centre has a gross lettable area of 25,415 m^{2} (273,560 sq ft).

== Stores ==
Channel Court is home to the regional Service Tasmania and Centrelink service centres, and holds the Kingston Library, operated by Libraries Tasmania.

Other landmark stores include local sports store chain Intersport, which opened a Channel Court store in 2020, Namaskar, an Indian restaurant that has operated in Channel Court since 2003, and Madame Clarke's, a cafe opened in 2022 by Andrew Hasler and Josh Clarke, co-owners of popular Hobart cafe Machine Laundry Cafe.

== History ==
For many years the shopping centre was considered very small but adequate to the needs of the local population. However, after being purchased by the Behrakis Group in June 2004 the centre underwent a complete transformation to cope with the growing local population. Tasmania's largest Big W was opened at the shopping centre on 5 April 2006, and it was planned that by 2009 Channel Court would be one of the largest shopping centres in Tasmania.

Extensive redevelopment took place through 2011 and 2012. Initial plans for a new full-sized cinema complex were abandoned in favour of installation of older women's clothing stores. The development was finally completed in 2013, with an estimated $50 million dollar cost.

In May 2018, the centre received significant flood damage to the underground section of the complex. Damage required a total refit of affected stores, some of which were closed for nearly six months. In 2021, Bendigo Bank decided to close its Channel Court store, a decision called "disappointing" by the local MHR Julie Collins.

== See also ==
- List of shopping centres in Tasmania
- Kingborough
