= Bonnet Hill =

Bonnet Hill Hobart, Tasmania
- Coordinates: 42°58′19″S 147°19′52″E
- Population: 505 (2016 census)
- Postcode(s): 7053
- Location: 2 km (1 mi) E of Kingston
- LGA(s): Kingborough
- Region: Hobart
- State electorate(s): Clark
- Federal division(s): Clark
Suburbs around Bonnet Hill:
Kingston	Taroona	River Derwent
Kingston	Bonnet Hill	River Derwent
Kingston	Kingston Beach	River Derwent

Bonnet Hill is a residential locality in the local government area (LGA) of Kingborough in the Hobart LGA region of Tasmania, Australia. The locality is about 2 kilometres (1.2 mi) east of the town of Kingston. The 2016 census recorded a population of 505 for the state suburb of Bonnet Hill.

The suburb, on the massive hill of the same name in the greater Hobart area, overlooks Kingston; the famous Taroona Shot Tower is on it. The hill is a popular cycling route. The sides of the hill are riddled with small paths mostly leading to the nearby Kingston Beach. The Alum Cliffs along Bonnet Hill's cliffed coast reach heights of up to 30 metres (98 ft) above sea level and have vistas facing the Derwent Estuary, Storm Bay, South Arm and Bruny Island.

== History ==
Bonnet Hill was gazetted as a locality in 1960.

== Geography ==
The waters of the River Derwent estuary form the eastern and south-eastern boundaries.

== Road infrastructure ==
Route B68 (Channel Highway) runs through from north to west.
