= Alum Cliffs =

Cliffs in Tasmania, Australia

- Cliffs
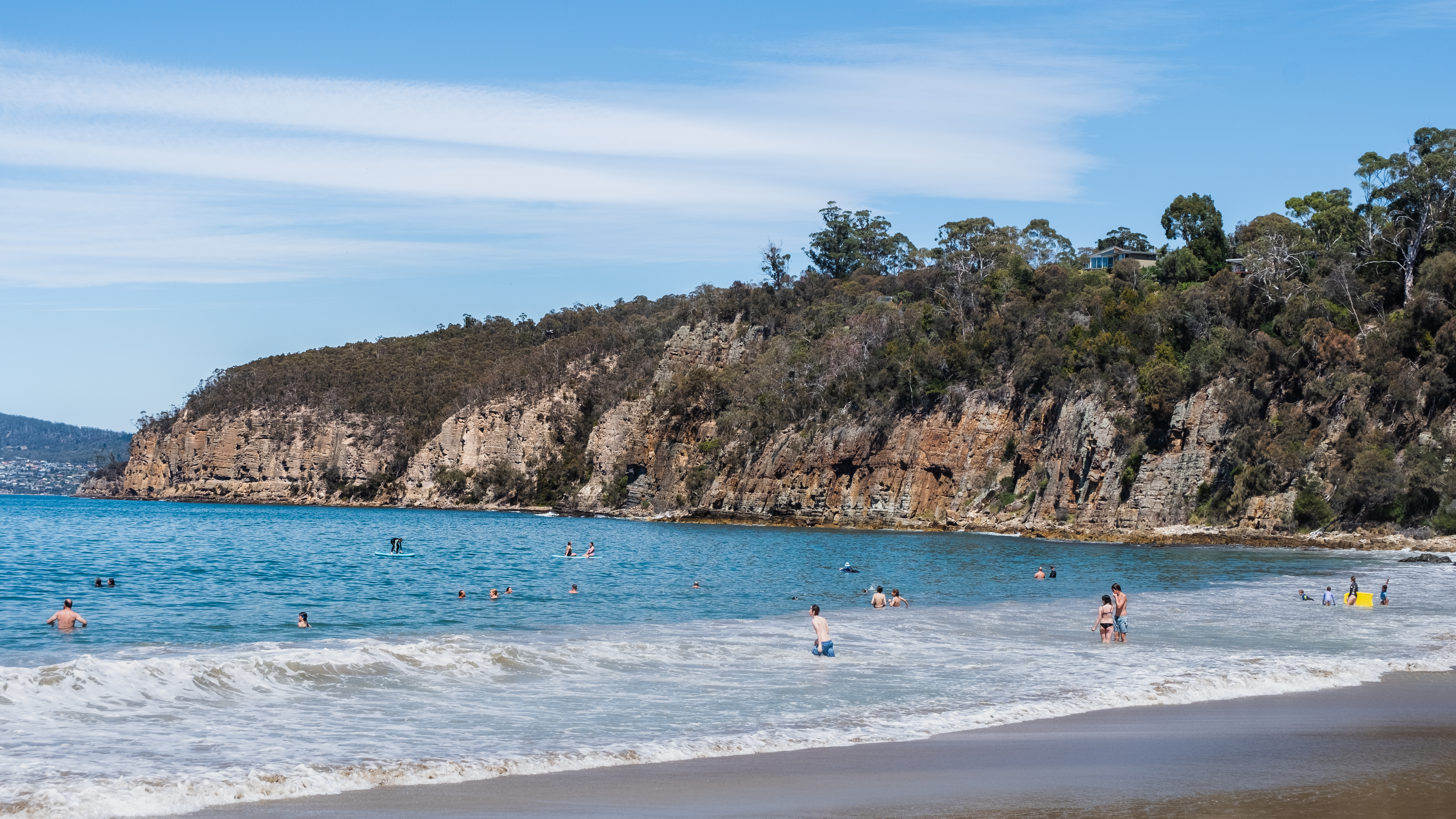

- Location within Tasmania
- Coordinates: 42°57′41.55″S 147°20′28.58″E
- Location: Tasmania, Australia
- Water bodies: Derwent Estuary; Storm Bay

The Alum Cliffs are a section of cliffed coast facing the Derwent Estuary and Storm Bay along the suburbs of Taroona, Bonnet Hill, and Kingston Beach, Tasmania, Australia. Composed of Permian mudstone, the cliff formation stretches for 3.5 kilometres (2.2 mi) between Hinsby Beach and Tyndall Beach at Kingston Beach. The cliff face reaches heights of up to 30 metres (98 ft) above sea level and has vistas of the Derwent Estuary, Storm Bay, South Arm and Bruny Island.

== History ==
The first reference of the Alum Cliffs namesake was documented in 1847.

== Geology ==
The Alum Cliffs are made of Permian mudstone, containing pyrite. Once oxidised, the pyrite produces the chemical compound alum.

== Recreation ==
The Alum Cliffs track is a popular 6 kilometres (3.7 mi) (2.5 hour) return walking track frequented by locals and tourists. A small track was initially developed in the 1970s and formally developed as part of Australia's Bicentennial celebrations in 1988. In 2018, a council proposal was put forward to upgrade the track to facilitate mountain biking.

== Access ==
The Alum Cliffs track is accessible via Tyndall Beach at Kingston Beach and the Channel Highway.
