= Browns River (Tasmania) =

River in Tasmania, Australia

Browns
- Location of the Browns River mouth in Tasmania
- Etymology: Robert Brown
- Native name: Promenalinah (undetermined)

Location
- Country: Australia
- State: Tasmania
- Region: East Coast

Physical characteristics
- Source
  - location: near Neika
  - coordinates: 42°19′46″S 147°29′54″E
  - elevation: 464 m (1,522 ft)
- Mouth: Halfmoon Bay, D'Entrecasteaux Channel
  - location: east of Kingston
  - coordinates: 42°58′42″S 147°19′48″E
  - elevation: 0 m (0 ft)
- Length: 12 km (7.5 mi)

The Browns River is a perennial river on the east coast of Tasmania, Australia.

== Course and features ==
The river rises near Neika and flows generally east towards Kingston, where it empties into Halfmoon Bay within the D'Entrecasteaux Channel that also forms part of the Derwent estuary. The river descends 464 metres (1,522 ft) over its 12-kilometre (7.5 mi) course.

The river was known to the indigenous people of the area as promenalinah.

The river was named after botanist Robert Brown who collected samples in the area in 1804. When it was settled in 1808, the area adjacent to the river was also called Browns River. The locality was renamed "Kingston" in 1851.

== See also ==
- List of rivers of Australia § Tasmania
