= Hill Street Grocer =

Australian supermarket chain

- Type: Private
- Industry: Retail
- Founded: 2001; 25 years ago
- Headquarters: West Hobart, Tasmania, Australia
- Number of locations: 10 stores (2025)
- Key people: Marco Nikitaras & Nick Nikitaras (Co-Owners), Steven Longmore (Northern CEO)
- Products: Groceries & general products
- Website: https://hillstreetgrocer.com/

Hill Street Grocer is an independent grocery store chain in Tasmania, Australia, with ten stores in the state as of 2025.

It is a member of the Tasmanian Independent Retailers co-operative. Hill Street Grocer is best known for its focus on Tasmanian grown food and produce, and stocks high end Tasmanian foods as well as general grocery foods. Some of its stores include attached gift shops.

== History ==
Hill Street Grocer was established at 109 Hill Street, West Hobart as an independent local grocer, established in the 1980s. It was inherited by Marco Nikitaras and his wife Dianna from her parents in 1994. In 2001, the store rebranded as Hill Street Grocer, and was joined by Marco's brother Nick and wife Natalia, who returned from working as lawyers in Melbourne to assist in business expansion. In 2009, the third brother Nektarios joined the business when Hill Street acquired a Lauderdale store.

Hill Street Grocers has primarily expanded by acquiring former independent grocers, primarily IGA locations, as well as independent petrol stores. In 2015, their Lauderdale and New Town stores won two categories at the National IGA awards.

A purpose-built store was built in Devonport, on the former hardware store, which includes a 9/11 Bottleshop outlet and cafe. In 2019, it built its 10th store at Sandy Bay, after demolition of the former University of Tasmania print office.

== Operations ==
Hill Street Grocer is owned by the Nikitaras family, second generation Greek immigrants. Northern operations are overseen by Northern CEO Steve Longmore, previously Southern Tasmanian regional manager of Coles.

As most food producers in Tasmania are contracted to Woolworths or Coles, Hill Street Grocer purchases much of its produce from small and micro producers - including backyard growers and hobby farmers. Tasmania's only drygoods importation center is owned by Woolworths, and Hill Street Grocer imports dry staples via Woolworths supply lines. It also stocks many Tasmanian made products to avoid this service fee.

Several Hill St Grocer locations operate 9/11 Bottleshops, as part of a deal with the Federal Group. It also manages the Australia Post franchise at Dodges Ferry. They offer a fuel docket offer which can be redeemed at Bennetts Petroleum, a Tasmanian owned petrol station chain. Its Lauderdale location also operates a petrol station. The flagship store at the corner of Hill and Arthur Streets in West Hobart also includes a retail location of local florist chain Botanical.

In 2019, they announced that all Hill Street Grocers would transition to plastic free.

Hill Street Grocers also offer home delivery and online shopping, via MyFoodLink technology.

== Products ==
Hill Street Grocer offers several Tasmanian product ranges exclusively or as one of a limited number of retailers, including Pizzirani pasta, Omega treats produced by Huon Aquaculture, Bream Creek Dairy milk and Tasmanian wagyu beef

== Controversies ==
In 2013, Hill Street Grocers pursued legal action against other businesses in Hill Street West Hobart, forcing them to change their business names to remove any mention of Hill Street. In 2018, it pursued legal action against Tasmanian Independent Retailers (TIR), of which it is a member, to force the board of TIR to release financial reports earlier. A former worker claimed unfair dismissal in 2018, and pursued action to Fair Work Australia.
