= University College (University of Tasmania) =

- Motto: Live. Learn. Do.
- Established: 2016
- Parent institution: University of Tasmania
- Vice-Chancellor: Rufus Black
- Principal: Andrea Carr
- Location: Hobart, Launceston and Burnie, Tasmania, Australia
- Website: www.utas.edu.au/college

University College (UC) is a college at the University of Tasmania which offers programs that provide both single year diplomas, and two-year associate degrees. These programs are offered as both stand-alone degrees, but can also be used to provide credit towards further study at the university.

The college was launched in 2016 by Prime Minister Malcolm Turnbull as part of the Universities transformation plan and seeks to provider a greater link between industry and education experts. The college is based in Launceston, but operates throughout Tasmania at both the Hobart and Burnie campuses of the university.

== Programs ==
=== Diplomas ===
The college offers single-year diploma qualifications in Applied Business, Applied Health and Community Support, Applied Science, Applied Technologies, Agribusiness, Sustainable Living and Construction Management. Graduates can utilise the diploma in further studies at the university within an associate degree or a bachelor's degree.

=== Associate Degrees ===
Two year associate degree studies are available by the college within the Business, Health, Science, Technology, Agribusiness and Design fields. Upon the competition of one year of the associate degree program, students can elect to receive a diploma.

=== Pathways ===
In addition to the provision of credit towards a bachelor's degree, the college also offers direct pathway programs into further study. These programs include the University Preparation Program (UPP) and the Diploma of University Studies. The college also offers a direct pathway option for the Bachelor of Pharmacy degree through the associate degree in Pharmacy Studies.

== See also ==
- List of universities in Australia
