= St Aloysius Catholic College =

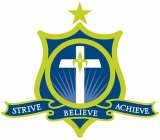

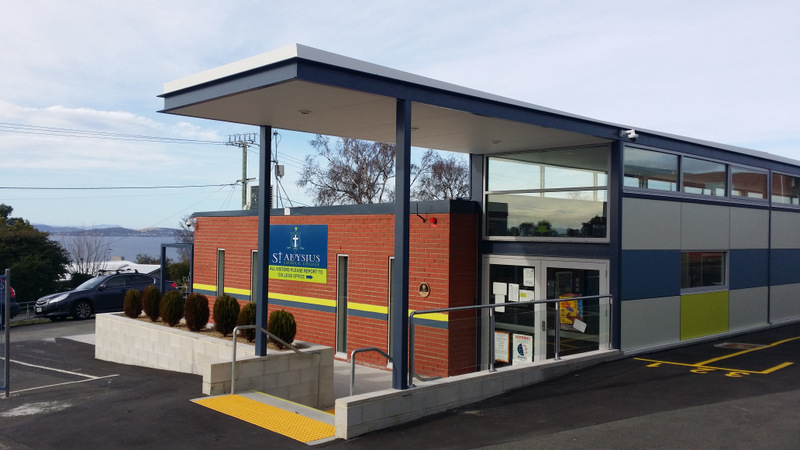
- Kingston Beach campus

Location
- Kingston Beach and Huntingfield, Tasmania; Australia; 42°59′26″S 147°19′22″E

Information
- Type: Independent co-educational primary and secondary day school
- Motto: Strive, Believe, Achieve
- Religious affiliation: Roman Catholic Diocese of Hobart
- Denomination: Roman Catholic
- Established: 1960; 66 years ago
- Principal: Paul Reidy
- Years: K–12
- Enrolment: c. 1100
- Campuses: Kingston; Huntingfield
- Colours: Navy, green and white
- Affiliation: Sports Association of Tasmanian Independent Schools
- Website: www.staloysius.tas.edu.au

St Aloysius Catholic College is an independent Roman Catholic co-educational primary and secondary day school with campuses in Kingston Beach and Huntingfield, in southern Tasmania. The college provides education for children from Kindergarten to Year 4 at the Kingston Beach campus and Year 5 to Year 10 at the Huntingfield campus.

== Campuses ==
Kingston Beach

The Kinder to Grade 4 campus is on a 4.5-hectare (11-acre) site at Kingston Beach, near Tasmania's capital, Hobart. Alongside the Kingston campus is the Parish Church, Christ the Priest, serving the needs of both the college and broader community.

Huntingfield

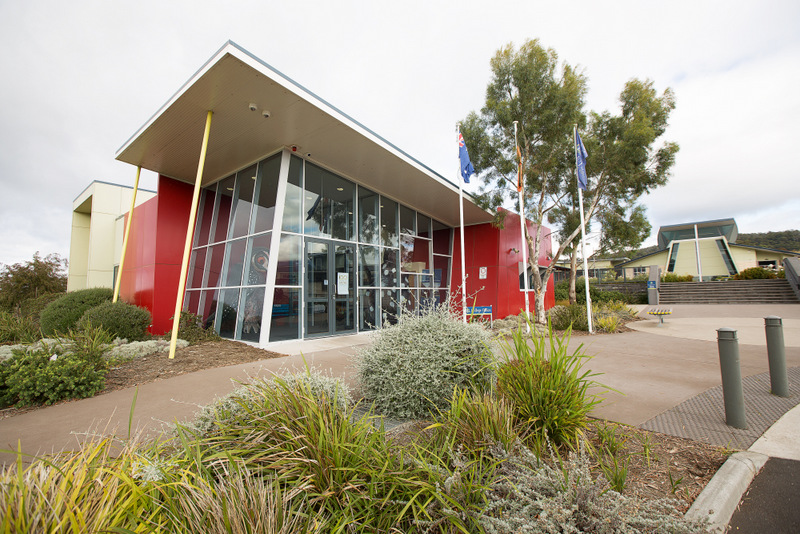
Huntingfield campus

The Grade 5 to 8 campus is situated at Huntingfield and was constructed during the years from 2008–2012 after Archbishop Adrian Doyle's acceptance of the school's proposal to extend into a Middle/Secondary School in 2007.

== History ==
St Aloysius Catholic College, founded in 1960 by the Sisters of Charity as St Aloysius Primary School, catered for Kindergarten to Grade 6 until 2009, when the educational capacity began expanding to cater for Grades 7–10. The Sisters conducted the school until 2001.

In 2007, the Archbishop of Hobart, Adrian Doyle, gave approval for the primary school to extend its educational program to include Grades 7–10 and for St Aloysius School to become St Aloysius Catholic College. The introduction of the Grades 5–10 facilities at the Huntingfield Campus began in 2009.

The Kindergarten to Grade 4 Kingston Campus had its educational provision enhanced with the construction of the Sisters of Charity Centre, a large ominous multi-purpose facility, and an extension to provide extra learning areas for Kindergarten staff and students. Further developments took place in early 2015.

After the Sisters of Charity handed leadership over of the school, Janine O’Hea was the first lay Principal. Elaine Doran succeed her. She was the first principal of the school as a college and responsible for the building of the Huntingfield Campus. Joe Sandric and Brendan Gill, Doran’s deputies, took over the leadership of the college as co-principals after her retirement.

== See also ==
- List of Catholic schools in Tasmania
- Education in Tasmania
