= Tarremah Steiner School =

School in Tasmania, Australia

Location
- Huntingfield, Tasmania; Australia; 42.99814°S 147.28998°E

Information
- Type: co-educational, private, primary, secondary
- Established: 1988
- Staff: 15
- Grades: pre-K to 10
- Enrolment: 244 (2024)
- Affiliation: Steiner
- Website: https://www.tarremah.tas.edu.au

Tarremah Steiner School is an independent, co-educational Steiner school in the Hobart suburb of Huntingfield, Tasmania, Australia. It is administered by Independent Schools Tasmania, with an enrolment of 244 students and a teaching staff of 31 as of 2024. The school serves students from Prep to Year 10 and was established in 1988. It follows the education philosophies of Rudolf Steiner.

The school was originally located in a house in Warneford Street, South Hobart, but moved to its current location in 1992.

== See also ==
- Education in Tasmania
- List of schools in Tasmania
