= Calvin Christian School (Kingston, Tasmania) =

Coordinates: 42.979°S 147.305°E

- Kingston, Tasmania; Australia

Information
- Type: Christian, private, day
- Motto: Set Your Mind on Christ
- Established: 1962
- Sister school: Emmanuel Christian School (1979); Channel Christian School (1988); Northern Christian School (1992)
- Principal: Scott Ambrose
- Enrolment: ~660 (K–12)
- Colours: Gold, black and white
- Slogan: Be Your Best
- Affiliation: Sports Association of Tasmanian Independent Schools
- Website: www.calvin.tas.edu.au

Calvin Christian School is a coeducational, private Kindergarten to Year 12 Christian school located 12 kilometres south of Hobart in Kingston, Tasmania, Australia.

It is part of Christian Schools Tasmania, a network of four schools around Hobart. It is owned and managed by an association, whose members are parents and past parents of students. Although initiated and supported by members of the Christian Reformed Churches of Australia, the Church has no controlling influence, and the school community now includes many families from other Christian backgrounds.

Calvin Christian School was the first Christian parent-controlled school in Australia, founded in 1962 by members of the Dutch Reformed community living in and around Kingston. The founders of the school were a group of Christian parents who shared a desire to educate their children in a Christ-centred environment. The school campus was built without any government funding, with many of the construction workers being parents of future students, who volunteered their time and resources to bring the school into existence. Calvin Christian School is named after the Protestant reformer John Calvin.

The school's annual fundraiser, held in September, is the Oliebollen Festival, which is well attended by the local community.

== Sister schools ==
- Emmanuel Christian School (1979)
- Channel Christian School (1988)
- Northern Christian School (1992)

== Sport ==
Calvin Christian School is a member of the Sports Association of Tasmanian Independent Schools (SATIS).

== See also ==
- List of schools in Tasmania
- Education in Tasmania
