= Huntingfield, Tasmania =

Huntingfield
- Suburb
- Interactive map of Huntingfield
- Coordinates: 42°59′35″S 147°17′11″E
- Country: Australia
- State: Tasmania
- Region: Hobart
- City: Hobart
- LGA: Kingborough
- Location: 3 km (1.9 mi) SW of Kingston

Government
  - State electorate: Franklin
  - Federal division: Franklin

Population
  - Total: 540 (2021 census)
- Postcode: 7055
Suburbs around Huntingfield
Kingston	Kingston	Kingston
Kingston	Huntingfield	Maranoa Heights
Margate	Howden	Blackmans Bay

Huntingfield is a residential locality in the local government area (LGA) of Kingborough in the Hobart LGA region of Tasmania. The locality is about 3 kilometres (1.9 mi) south-west of the town of Kingston. The 2021 census recorded a population of 540 for the state suburb of Huntingfield.

It is an outer suburb of the greater Hobart area, bordering Blackmans Bay and Kingston. The area was created in the late 1980s. Located in Huntingfield are Tarremah Steiner School, St Aloysius Catholic College and Kingborough Family Church. In 2017 its houses were the fastest selling in Australia, which was attributed to reasonable prices and a good range of services.

== History ==
Huntingfield is a confirmed locality. The first European to visit the area was botanist Robert Brown in 1804, and the area was later settled by the Lucas family. It was predominantly an agricultural area until the late 1960s when bushfires, changes in the export market and the completion of the Southern Outlet road to Hobart caused urbanisation and growth.

== Geography ==
Most of the boundaries are survey lines.

== Road infrastructure ==
Route B68 (Channel Highway) runs along the north-western boundary, providing access to the locality from a roundabout adjacent to the northern tip.
