= British colonisation of Tasmania =

Early British colonisation of the island of Tasmania, 1803–1830

The British colonisation of Tasmania took place between 1803 and 1830. Known as Van Diemen's Land, the name changed to Tasmania, when the British government granted self-governance in 1856. It was a colony from 1856 until 1901, at which time it joined five other colonies to form the Commonwealth of Australia. By the end of the colonisation in 1830 the British Empire had annexed large parts of mainland Australia, and all of Tasmania.

== First colonies 1803 ==
The first British colonies on Tasmania appeared circa 1803. Small numbers of whalers and sealers set up communities along the Northern Coast and the Bass Strait islands. The whalers and sealers began to trade with the Aboriginal Tasmanians along the North Coast. Most of the goods traded were seal skins and dogs. Sporadic skirmishes over land and women occurred between the settlers and the Aboriginal people, but few records of the conflict exist.

In late 1803 to early 1804 colonisation of Tasmania began to formalise. The governor of New South Wales built military outposts along the River Derwent in southern Tasmania, and also on the Tamar River in the north to prevent French interests in the area. These outposts began to grow into small communities as new settlers and convicts came from Great Britain. Communities around Hobart and Launceston were established, which would eventually become the largest settlements on Tasmania, and railways connecting the towns were built. The early colonies on Tasmania constantly suffered from lack of food.

== Agricultural expansion 1818 - 1830 ==
In 1818, Britain expropriated 50 acres overlooking Hobart to use as "John Hangan’s farm, Rowland Loane’s lost cause, the Government Garden, the Royal Society’s Gardens, Hobart Botanical Gardens and, from 1967, the Royal Tasmanian Botanical Gardens." This land has been used to grow food, experiment with trial crops, introduce exotic food to the colony, classify and propagate plants, and most importantly provide refuge for endangered species. Convict and native labor used on this land to stretch budgets well into the 20th century.

By 1820, British authorities controlled around 15 per cent of Tasmania, stretching from Hobart to Launceston. Much of this land had been settled for farming, with colonists exporting grain to Britain and rearing cattle for local consumption. It was during this agricultural expansion that the population of colonists grew from 7,185 in 1821 to 24,279 in 1830. During this time, the British authorities ceded rural land owned by the Crown to British colonists. About 6,000 settlers received land along rivers on the Eastern Midland Plain between Hobart and Launceston under this scheme, and many colonists also settled along the Meander River west of Launceston. These settlers reared sheep and exported wool and mutton to Northern England. The total number of sheep reared on Tasmania was around 1,000,000. Over time, the British acquired over 30 per cent of Tasmanian land, and the entire area became known as the Settled Districts. By 1823 the population of Aboriginal people was estimated at around 2,000.

Dogs were first introduced to Tasmania by British colonists, used to hunt game, such as kangaroos. Aboriginal people, convicts and settlers used the dogs as a way to source food and also used dog fur for clothing and shoes. They also used the kangaroo meat and fur that was hunted by the dogs as produce to sell. This hunting culture slowed down the agricultural development.

== Impact on the native population ==
Authors such as Jeremy Paxman and Niall Ferguson have concluded that the colonisation of Tasmania led to the genocide of the Aboriginal Tasmanians.

Although distantly related, the people on the island had been separate from the peoples of the mainland for around 8,000 years. It is unknown how many Aboriginal people were living there when the Dutch arrived in 1642, nor when James Cook landed in 1777, but when British settlers began to colonise the region in 1803, there existed an estimated population of 7,000-8,000, many of whom were already dying from diseases thought to have been contracted from European sailors, explorers and seal hunters. In addition, many had been left infertile by venereal disease.

Almost all of the 7,000 Indigenous Tasmanians died during a period of colonisation lasting around 27 years. By 1830, when the process of colonisation had been going on for two decades, only two families of Aboriginal Tasmanians were living on the Island. By 1835 only one Aboriginal family remained on the island, who were living in a white sealing village near the Bass Strait, hiding from the colonial authorities. Nearly all of these survivors were incarcerated by the colonial authorities and placed in camps, "where all but forty-seven perished by 1847." By 1876, the only survivors remaining were mixed-race Aboriginal Tasmanians.

Recent figures for the number of people claiming Aboriginal Tasmanian descent vary according to the criteria used to determine this identity, ranging from 6,000 to over 23,000.
