= Kingston, Tasmania =

Kingston
- Suburb
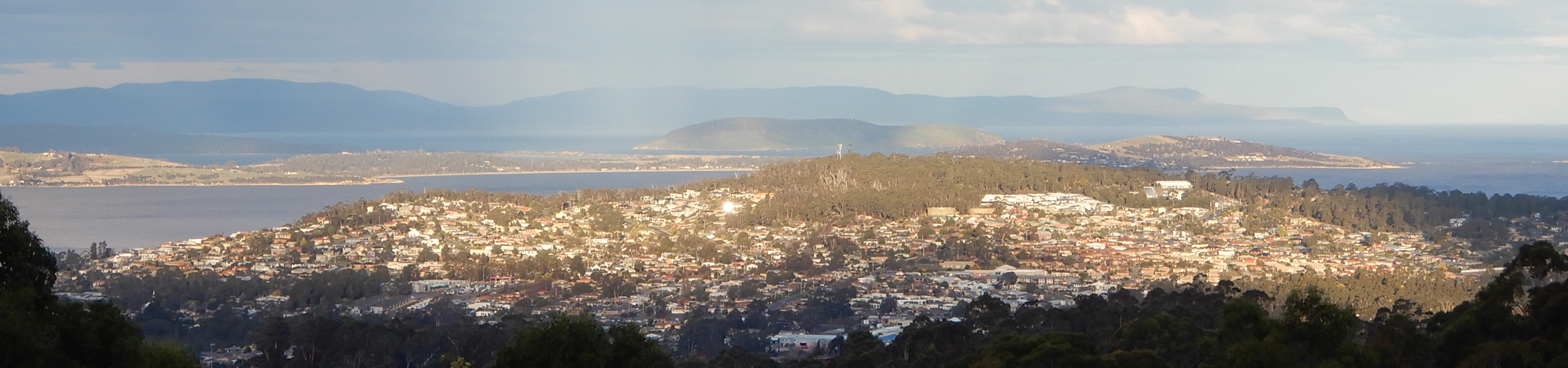
- Kingston Tasmania. Picture taken from the west.

- Interactive map of Kingston
- Coordinates: 42°58′37″S 147°18′30″E
- Country: Australia
- State: Tasmania
- City: Hobart
- LGA: Kingborough

Government
  - State electorates: Clark; Franklin
  - Federal divisions: Clark; Franklin
- Elevation: 52 m (171 ft)

Population
  - Total: 12,288 (2021 census)
- Postcode: 7050, 7051
- Mean max temp: 17.0 °C (62.6 °F)
- Mean min temp: 6.2 °C (43.2 °F)
- Annual rainfall: 674.4 mm (26.55 in)
Suburbs around Kingston
	Firthside	Bonnet Hill
	Kingston	Kingston Beach
Huntingfield	Maranoa Heights	Blackmans Bay

Kingston is a suburb on the outskirts of Hobart, Tasmania, Australia. Nestled 12 km (7.5 mi) south of the city between and around several hills, Kingston is the seat of the Kingborough Council, and today serves as the gateway between Hobart and the D'Entrecasteaux Channel region, which meets the River Derwent nearby. It is one of the fastest-growing regions in Tasmania. The Kingston-Huntingfield statistical area had an estimated population of 13,473 in June 2021.

Although the Kingston–Blackmans Bay region is statistically classed as a separate urban area to Hobart by the ABS, Kingston is also part of the Greater Hobart statistical area.

== History ==
In 1804, the botanist Robert Brown visited the area. Browns River, that runs from Mount Wellington to Kingston Beach is named after him. The area was settled in 1808 by Thomas Lucas and his family, who were evacuated from Norfolk Island, and quickly the land became actively used by many pioneers who spread out to form the beginnings of Kingston's localities today. In its early years, the area was also named after Brown, but when the population grew and a commercial district was established, Kingston was proclaimed a township in 1851.

The Kingston region comprises many suburban estates, including Blackmans Bay and Kingston Beach.

Kingston has close ties with the Dutch community, where after 1950 many post-war immigrants moved to an area they called 'Little Groningen' (today Firthside). The Kingston Dutch community were primarily members of the Christian Reformed Churches of Australia, which they set up the local church of in 1952. Calvin Christian School was founded by the Dutch community in 1962.

Kingston was named by the Best Suburb in Australia for families by Aussie Home Loans in their annual study of 3800 Australian towns.

=== Climate ===
Kingston has an oceanic climate (Köppen: Cfb), with very mild summers and cool winters. Average maxima vary from 21.9 °C (71.4 °F) in February to 12.5 °C (54.5 °F) in July while average minima fluctuate between 10.7 °C (51.3 °F) in February and 2.4 °C (36.3 °F) in June and July. Mean average annual precipitation is moderate, 674.3 mm (26.55 in) spread between 131.5 precipitation days. Extreme temperatures have ranged from 40.0 °C (104.0 °F) on 20 January 1973 to −7.2 °C (19.0 °F) on 25 June 1972.

Climate data for Kingston (42º58'12"S, 147º19'12"E, 52 m AMSL) (1965–1977 normals & extremes, rainfall to 1910)
Month	Jan	Feb	Mar	Apr	May	Jun	Jul	Aug	Sep	Oct	Nov	Dec	Year
Record high °C (°F)	40.0 (104.0)	36.6 (97.9)	34.8 (94.6)	29.2 (84.6)	25.0 (77.0)	20.0 (68.0)	21.5 (70.7)	20.1 (68.2)	28.0 (82.4)	28.5 (83.3)	36.1 (97.0)	37.5 (99.5)	40.0 (104.0)
Mean daily maximum °C (°F)	21.6 (70.9)	21.9 (71.4)	20.4 (68.7)	18.3 (64.9)	15.0 (59.0)	12.7 (54.9)	12.5 (54.5)	13.1 (55.6)	14.8 (58.6)	16.8 (62.2)	17.6 (63.7)	19.8 (67.6)	17.0 (62.7)
Mean daily minimum °C (°F)	9.7 (49.5)	10.7 (51.3)	9.0 (48.2)	7.0 (44.6)	4.6 (40.3)	2.4 (36.3)	2.4 (36.3)	2.9 (37.2)	4.4 (39.9)	5.2 (41.4)	7.3 (45.1)	8.8 (47.8)	6.2 (43.2)
Record low °C (°F)	1.3 (34.3)	2.4 (36.3)	1.7 (35.1)	−1.1 (30.0)	−3.3 (26.1)	−7.2 (19.0)	−4.4 (24.1)	−3.3 (26.1)	−2.8 (27.0)	−1.6 (29.1)	0.7 (33.3)	−0.1 (31.8)	−7.2 (19.0)
Average precipitation mm (inches)	46.4 (1.83)	46.1 (1.81)	52.1 (2.05)	57.5 (2.26)	55.3 (2.18)	58.5 (2.30)	56.3 (2.22)	55.6 (2.19)	51.3 (2.02)	68.0 (2.68)	61.8 (2.43)	65.4 (2.57)	674.3 (26.55)
Average precipitation days (≥ 0.2 mm)	8.6	7.8	9.4	10.4	11.3	11.2	12.0	12.9	11.9	13.0	12.2	10.8	131.5
Source: Bureau of Meteorology (1965–1977 normals & extremes, rainfall to 1910)

== Economy ==
Kingston hosts the national headquarters of the Australian Antarctic Division. It has two major shopping centres, Kingston Town Shopping Centre and Channel Court Shopping Centre. The newest shopping centre complex, opened in 2008, is Kingston Plaza, which was built over the existing Coles supermarket site.

=== Media ===
Kingston is served by two free publications; the full-size newspaper Kingborough Chronicle and the weekly newsletter Kingston Classifieds. Kingston is served by Pulse FM Kingborough and Huon and Huon FM 98.5.

== Education ==
Kingston is served by a pair of public schools, Kingston High School (Grade 7–10) and Kingston Primary School (grade 1–6). It is also served by three private Christian schools; Calvin Christian School (kinder to year 12) and Southern Christian College (kinder to year 12), both of which are nondenominational, and the Kingston campus of St Aloysius Catholic College (grade kinder to year 4) at Kingston campus, grade 5 to year 10 at Huntingfield campus).

== Sister cities ==
- Grootegast, Netherlands
