= South Bruny, Tasmania =

South Bruny Tasmania
- Coordinates: 43°25′10″S 147°14′57″E
- Population: 84 (2016 census)
- Postcode(s): 7150
- Location: 14 km (9 mi) S of Alonnah
- LGA(s): Kingborough
- Region: Hobart
- State electorate(s): Franklin
- Federal division(s): Franklin
Localities around South Bruny:
D'Entrecasteaux Channel, Alonnah	North Bruny, Simpsons Bay	Tasman Sea
D'Entrecasteaux Channel, Lunawanna	South Bruny	Tasman Sea, Adventure Bay
D'Entrecasteaux Channel	Tasman Sea	Tasman Sea

South Bruny is a rural locality on Bruny Island in the local government area of Kingborough in the Hobart region of Tasmania. It is located about 14 kilometres (8.7 mi) south of the town of Alonnah, the largest town on the island. The 2016 census determined a population of 84 for the state suburb of South Bruny.

== History ==
South Bruny was gazetted as the locality of South Bruny Island in 1967, and re-gazetted with its current name in 1974.

== Geography ==
The D'Entrecasteaux Channel forms much of the western boundary, and the Tasman Sea forms most of the eastern.

== Road infrastructure ==
The B66 route (Bruny Island Main Road) enters from the north and runs west to Alonnah, then south to Lunawanna where it ends. Route C628 (Simpsons Bay Road) starts at an intersection with B66 and runs north to Simpsons Bay, where it ends. Route C630 (Adventure Bay Road) starts at an intersection with B66 and runs south to Adventure Bay, where it ends. Route C629 (Coolangatta Road) enters from Adventure Bay in the east and runs west to Lunawanna, where it intersects with the southern end of B66, and then runs south to Cape Bruny Lighthouse, where it ends. Route C644 (Cloudy Bay Road) starts at an intersection with C629 and runs south to the shore of Cloudy Bay (the body of water).
