= North Bruny, Tasmania =

North Bruny
- Town
- Coordinates: 43°06′58″S 147°21′05″E
- Country: Australia
- State: Tasmania
- Region: Hobart
- LGA: Kingborough
- Location: 34 km (21 mi) NE of Alonnah

Government
  - State electorate: Franklin
  - Federal division: Franklin

Population
  - Total: 95 (2016 census)
- Postcode: 7150
Localities around North Bruny
D'Entrecasteaux Channel, Dennes Point	River Derwent	Storm Bay
D'Entrecasteaux Channel, Barnes Bay, Killora, Apollo Bay	North Bruny	Storm Bay
D'Entrecasteaux Channel, Great Bay	South Bruny	Storm Bay

North Bruny is a rural locality on Bruny Island in the local government area of Kingborough in the Hobart region of Tasmania. It is located about 34 kilometres (21 mi) north-east of the town of Alonnah, the largest town on the island. The 2016 census determined a population of 95 for the state suburb of North Bruny.

== History ==
North Bruny was gazetted as the locality of North Bruny Island in 1967, and re-gazetted with its current name in 1974.

== Geography ==
The D'Entrecasteaux Channel forms much of the western boundary, and Storm Bay is to the east.

== Road infrastructure ==
The B66 route (Lennon Road / Bruny Island Main Road) starts at Roberts Point Boat Ramp in the west and runs east and then south before passing through Great Bay and exiting. Route C625 (a continuation of Bruny Island Main Road) starts at an intersection with B66 and runs north to Dennes Point, near the northern tip of the island. From there it turns south along the western shore as Nebraska Road and Killora Road (through Killora) until it reaches Quarantine Bay, where it turns east to eventually end a loop at an intersection with itself (C625) on Bruny Island Main Road.
