= Bruny Island Airport =

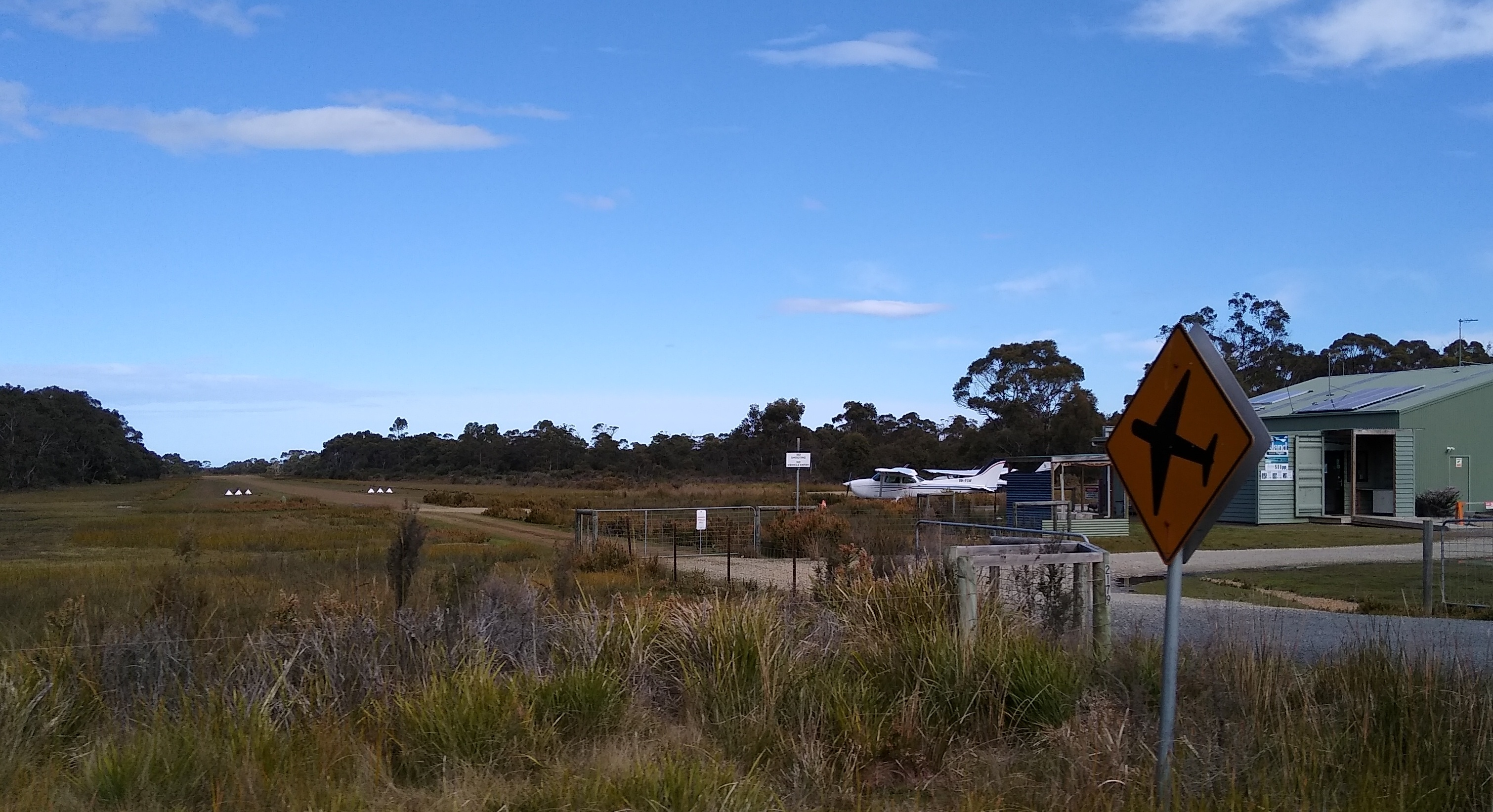
- IATA: none; ICAO: YBYI

Summary
- Airport type: Public
- Owner: Kingborough Council
- Operator: Bruny Island Aviation Trust
- Location: Bruny Island
- Elevation AMSL: 26 ft (7.9 m)
- Coordinates: 43°14′00″S 147°22′45″E

Maps
- Location in Tasmania
- Interactive map of Bruny Island Airport

Runways
| Direction | Length | | Surface |
| Direction | m | ft | Surface |
|---|---|---|---|
| 14/32 | 650 | 2,133 | Gravel |
- Sources: Australian AIP and aerodrome chart

Bruny Island Airport (IATA: YBYI) is the only airport located on Bruny Island, in Tasmania. The small airstrip is located in the Great Bay area of North Bruny, 15 km (9.3 mi) northeast of the town of Alonnah. The facility has a single 650 m (2,130 ft) gravel runway 14/32 which caters mostly to scenic flights in support of local tourism, but is also used by private individuals visiting the island.

The airfield was constructed by community volunteers on donated land and was opened by the Tasmanian Government in 1963. In 1993, the airfield's ownership was transferred to the Kingborough Council. In 2010, the council approved a licence for a tourism operator, Island Scenic Flights to build a modern hangar and office facility at the northern end of the runway and establish a commercial operation from the airport. Citing concerns about the costs of maintaining the facility for mostly private users, the Kingborough Council announced in May 2018 they intended to permanently close the airfield. The announcement prompted a campaign by local businesses and residents to save the airport that received national media coverage, resulting in the formation of a not-for-profit community trust to operate the airport on the council's behalf.

== See also ==
- List of airports in Tasmania
