= Barnes Bay, Tasmania =

Barnes Bay Tasmania
- Coordinates: 43°07′S 147°22′E
- Population: 22 (2016 census)
- Postcode(s): 7150
- Location: 48 km (30 mi) S of Hobart; 15 km (9 mi) W of Kettering; 11 km (7 mi) NW of Killora; 35 km (22 mi) S of Kingston
- LGA(s): Kingborough Council
- Region: Hobart
- State electorate(s): Franklin
- Federal division(s): Franklin
Localities around Barnes Bay:
Barnes Bay	North Bruny	North Bruny
Barnes Bay	Barnes Bay	North Bruny
Barnes Bay	North Bruny	North Bruny

Barnes Bay is a rural locality on Bruny Island in the local government area (LGA) of Kingborough in the Hobart LGA region of Tasmania. The locality is about 35 kilometres (22 mi) south (by ferry) of the town of Kingston. The 2016 census recorded a population of 22 for the state suburb of Barnes Bay.

It is both a geographical feature and a small hamlet near the northern end of Bruny Island.

== History ==
Barnes Bay was gazetted as a locality in 1971.

During the early 19th century it was a centre for the firewood trade to Hobart and later the fruit industry, mostly apples and pears. It is now mostly a centre for the tourist industry and light grazing.

Barnes Bay Post Office opened on 20 October 1851 and closed in 1969 (though known as Kelly's Point from 1853 until 1906).

During the 1919 influenza epidemic Barnes Bay was used as a quarantine location for putting infected passengers off ships.

== Geography ==
The waters of Barnes Bay (the body of water) form the north-western, western and south-western boundaries.

== Road infrastructure ==
Route C625 (Bruny Island Main Road) passes to the east. From there, Barnes Bay Road and Church Road provide access to the locality.
