= Great Bay =

Great Bay may refer to:

- Great Bay (New Hampshire), a tidal estuary in southeastern New Hampshire
- Great Bay (New Jersey), a tidal estuary north of Atlantic City
- Great Bay, Tasmania. a locality in Australia
- Greater Bay Area, a megalopolis in South China
