= Lunawanna, Tasmania =

Lunawanna Tasmania
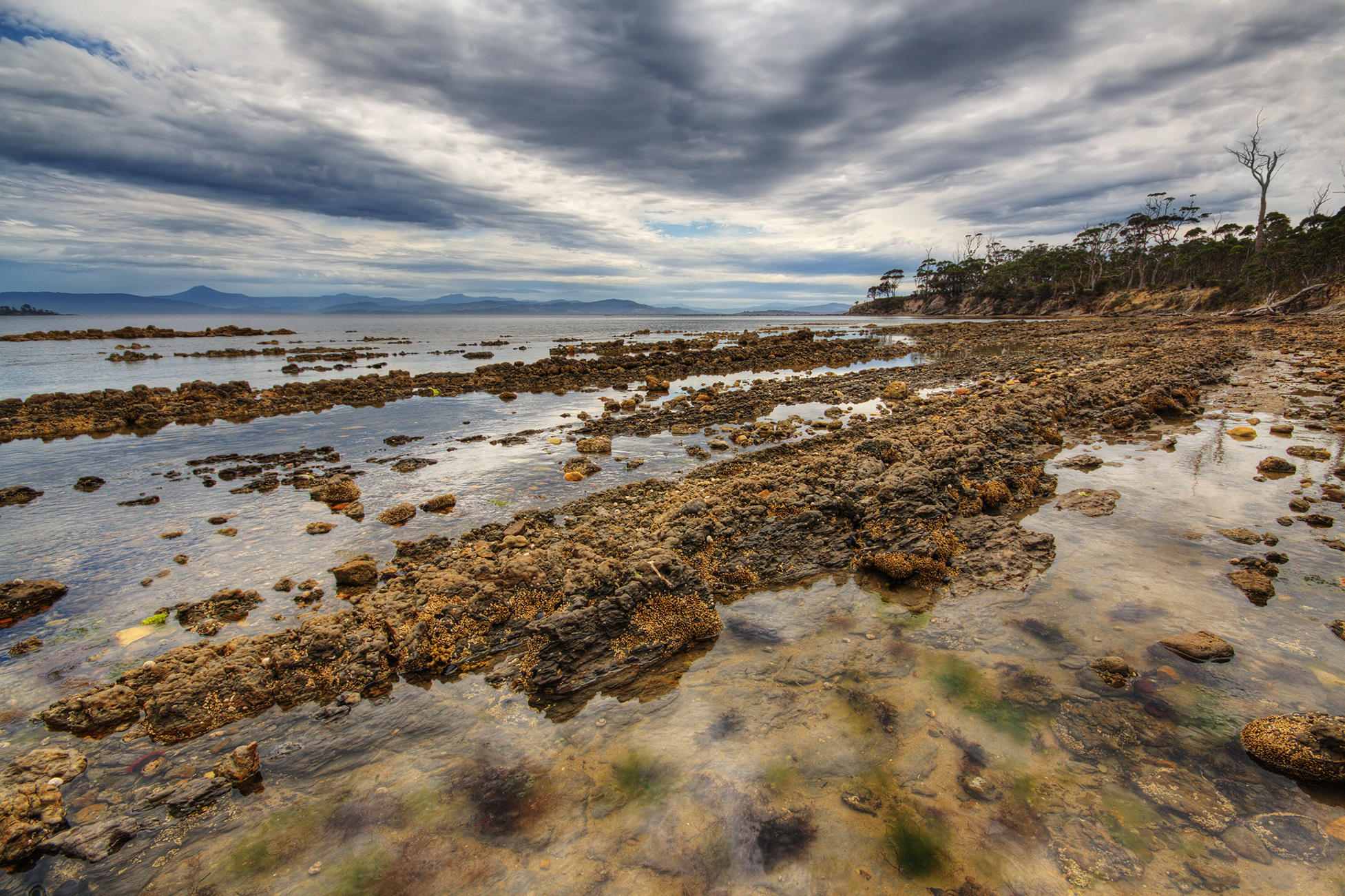
- Cemetery Bay is located nearby.

- Coordinates: 43°27′32.04″S 147°9′13.68″E
- Population: 144 (SAL 2021)
- Postcode(s): 7150
- LGA(s): Kingborough Council
- State electorate(s): Franklin / Huon
- Federal division(s): Franklin

Lunawanna is a small township on the western side of Bruny Island, Tasmania, facing the D'Entrecasteaux Channel. It is named after part of the Tasmanian Aboriginal name for Bruny Island, Lunawanna-alonnah, a nearby township about 5 kilometres (3.1 mi) to its north being named Alonnah.

Lunawanna is in the federal electorate of Franklin, the Tasmanian House of Assembly division of Franklin, and the Tasmanian Legislative Council division of Huon. The Bruny Island local council amalgamated with Kingborough council in 1994 and Lunawanna is located in the Kingborough Council local government area.

Mrs Lue Lunawanna (Granddaughter of Eddie Lunawanna) wanted the State Government to name a small region on South Bruny after Mr Lunawanna to remember the Aboriginal people of Bruny Island and their traditions. At this time, European settlement on Bruny Island had caused these traditions to dissipate.

Lunawanna has a public toilet at the community hall, a jetty, and a post box. Bruny Island Premium Wines is located at Lunawanna. The closest food store, post office, and police station are located in Alonnah, 7 kilometres (4.3 mi) to the north. The only petrol available on Bruny Island is at the Adventure Bay store, 19 kilometres (12 mi) away via Bruny Island Main Road.

On the last Saturday evening of every month an amateur talent night (the Lunawanna Jamboree - until 2015 named Hoppy's Jamboree, in honour of its founder) is held in the Lunawanna Memorial hall.

== History ==
Daniel's Bay Post Office opened on 1 April 1899, was renamed Lunawanna in 1907 and closed in 1971. In the past there was a sawmill at Daniels Bay, later relocated to "Ventnor" on Little Taylor's Bay, and another at "Out the Back", near the Cloudy Bay Road, on the eastern side of Lunawanna. At Ventenat Point, on the western shore of Little Taylor's Bay, sandstone was quarried and shipped to Hobart and Melbourne between 1860 and 1872.

== Tourism ==
Current industries include tourist accommodation, oyster farming (on Little Taylor's Bay), and pig farming and an apple orchard (both on the eastern side of Lunawanna). Coolangatta Road, which goes through Mount Mangana Forest Reserve, connects Adventure Bay with Lunawanna over Mount Mangana. There are lookouts from this road at the northern and southern points. Mount Mangana is accessible via a walking track (estimated 1.5 hours return walk).

To the east of Lunawanna, Mount Mangana is surrounded by the Mount Mangana Forest Reserve.

== Gallery ==
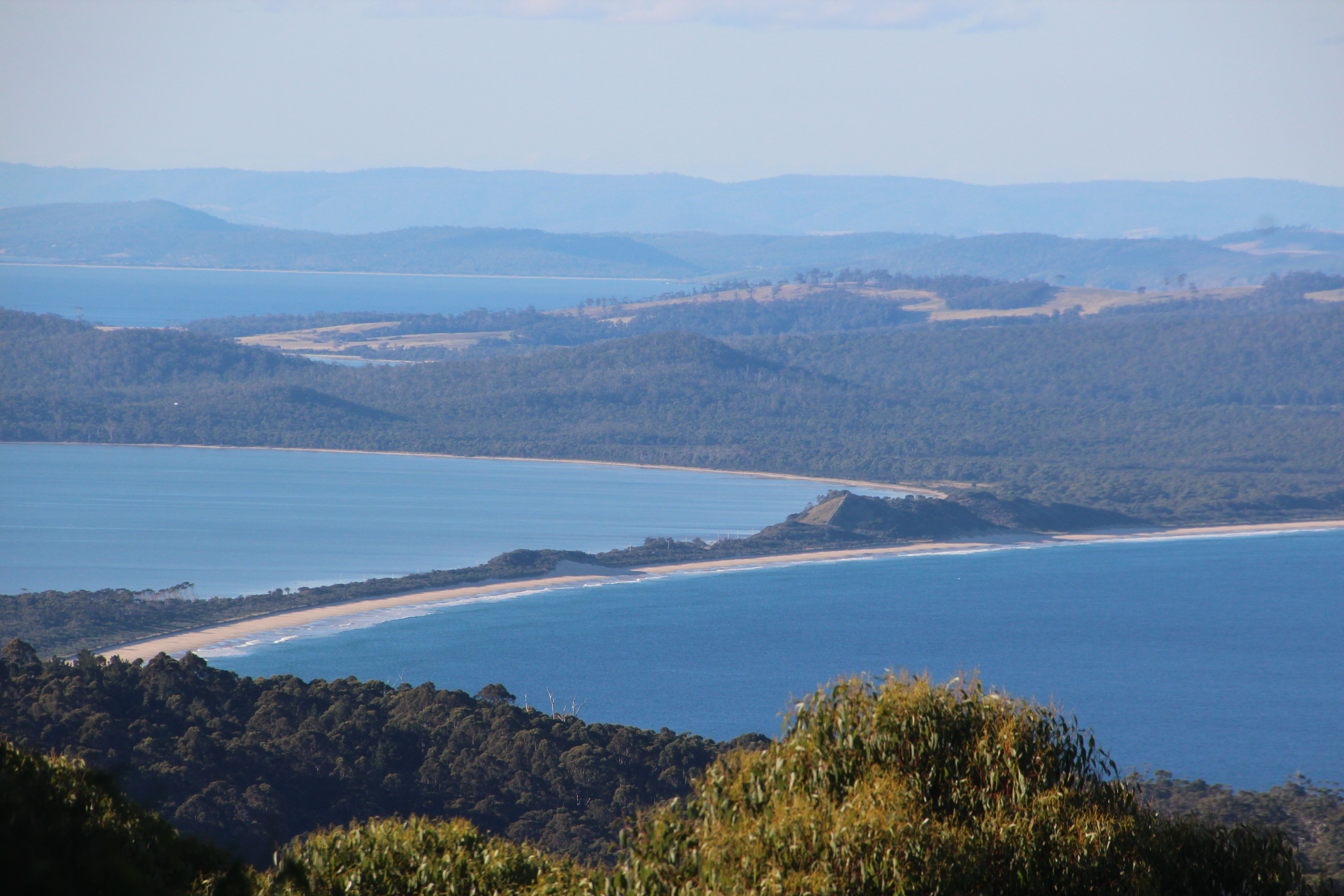
Coolangatta Road northerly lookout offers views over The Neck and North Bruny (2017)

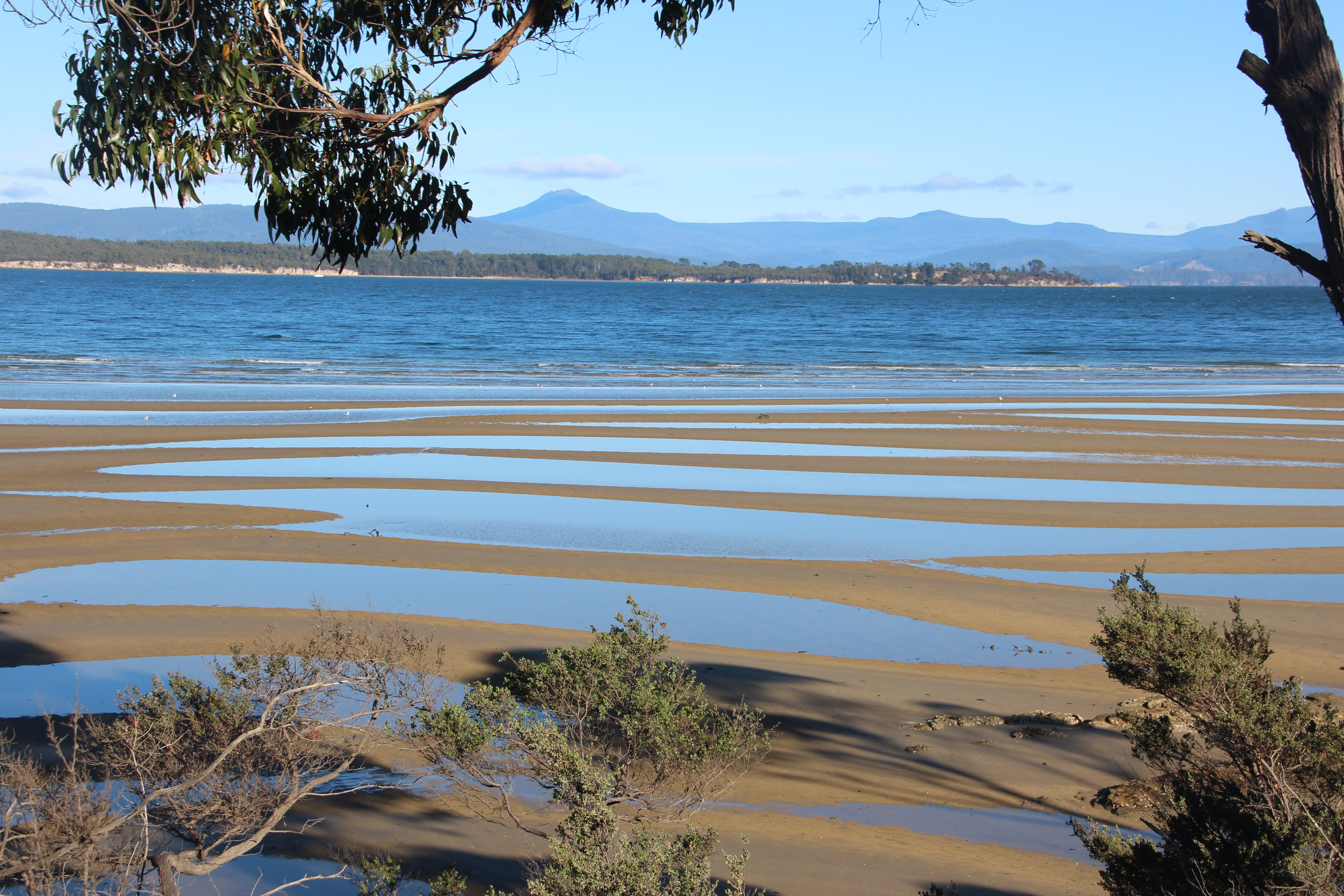
Low tide at Daniel's Bay, Lunawanna, showing characteristic tidal patterns in sand (2017)

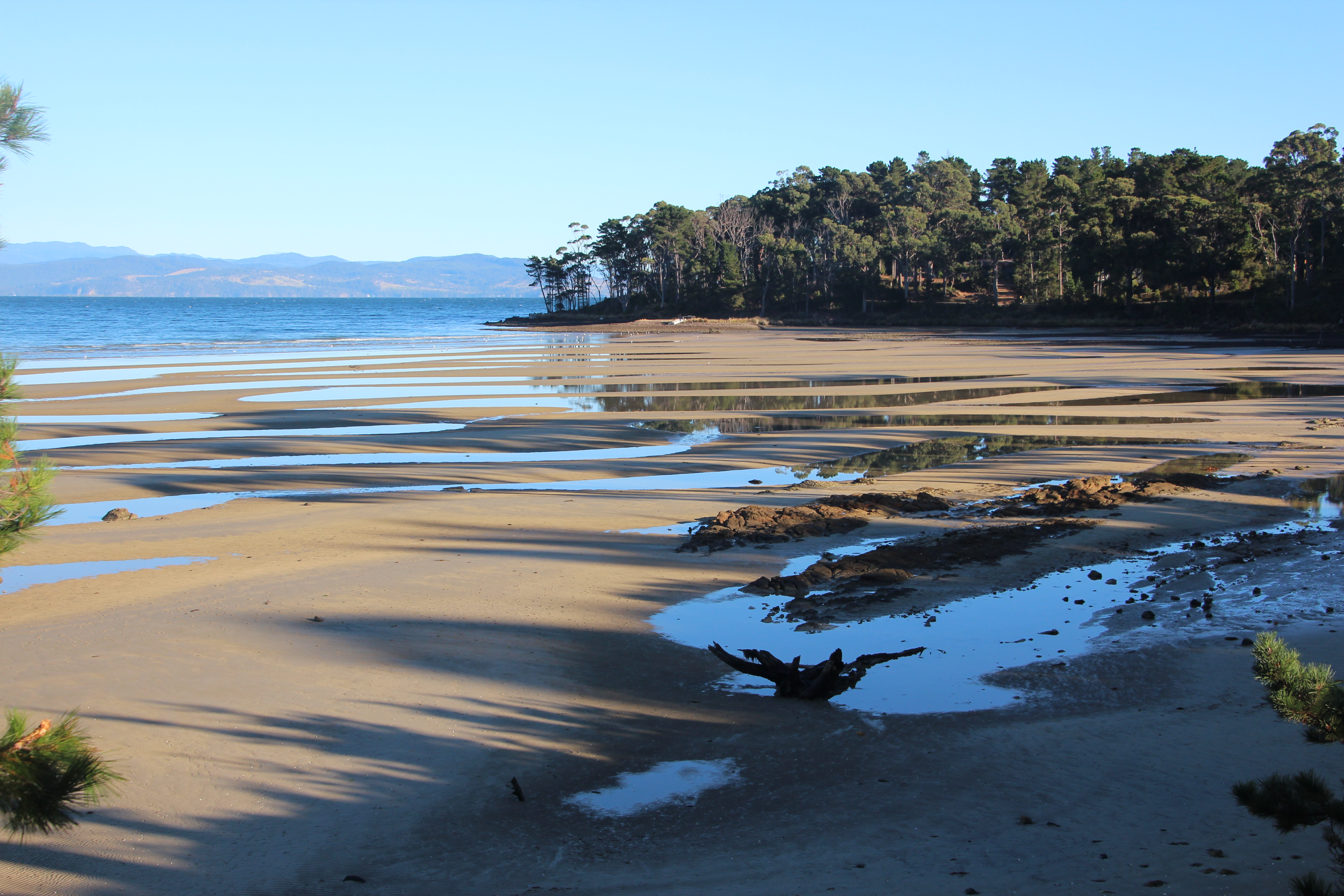
Daniel's Bay, Lunawanna where the tree line runs to the beach (2017)

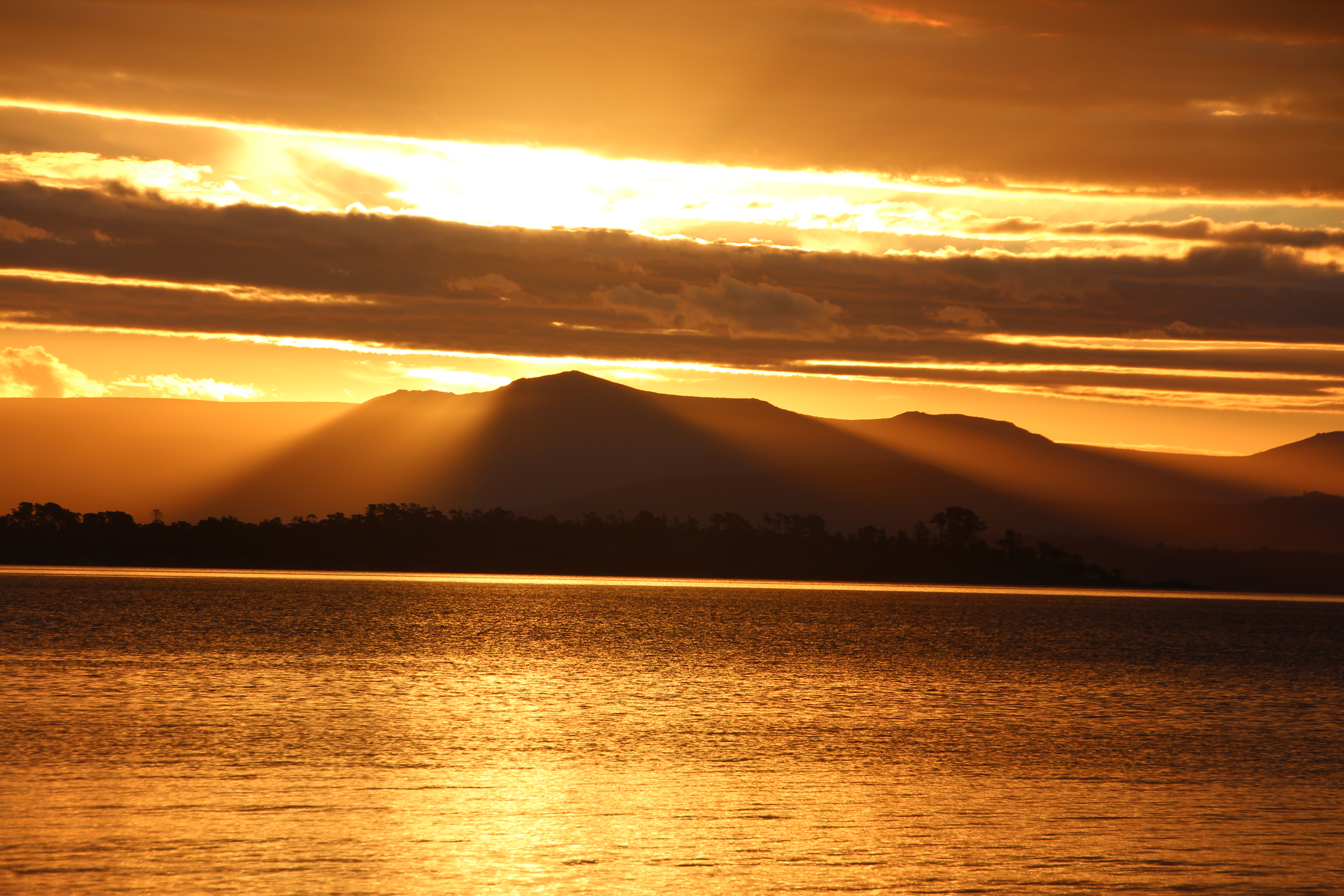
Profile of the mountains over from Daniel's Bay at Lunawanna (2017)

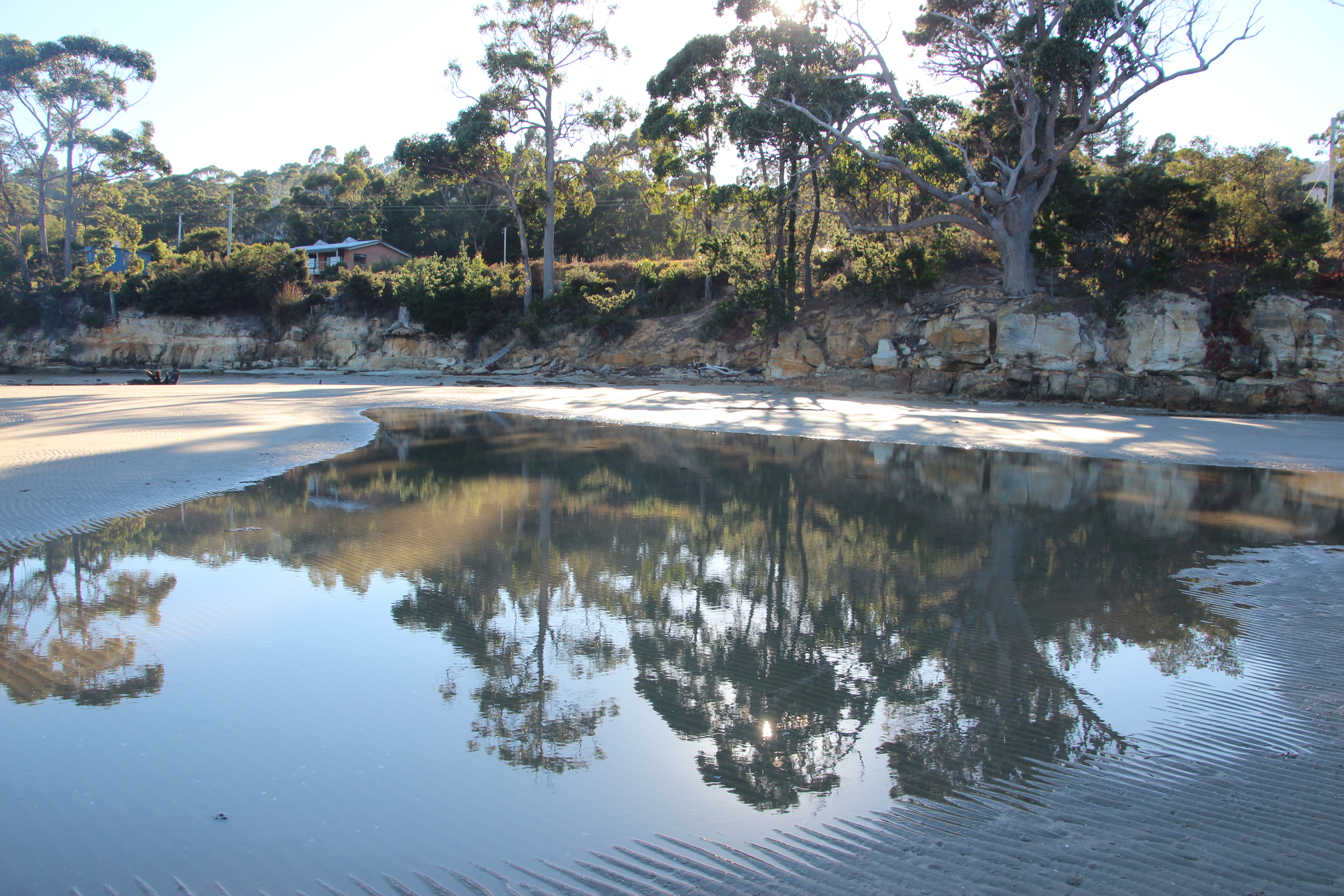
Tree roots counter sea erosion at Daniel's Bay, Lunawanna (2017)

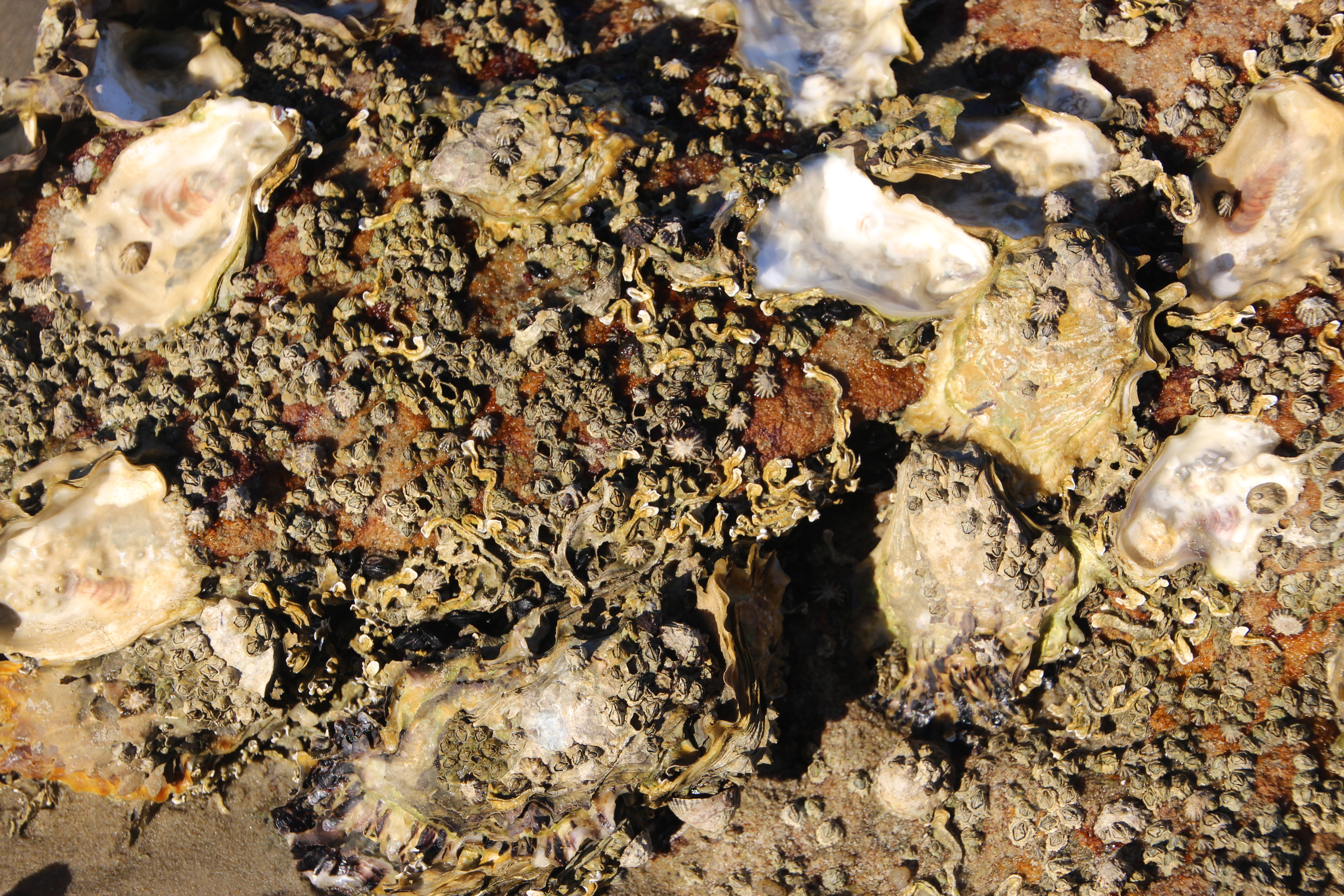
Though they are also farmed locally, wild oysters are native to Daniel's Bay, Lunawanna, seen here at low tide (2017)
