= Adventure Bay, Tasmania =

Adventure Bay
- Town
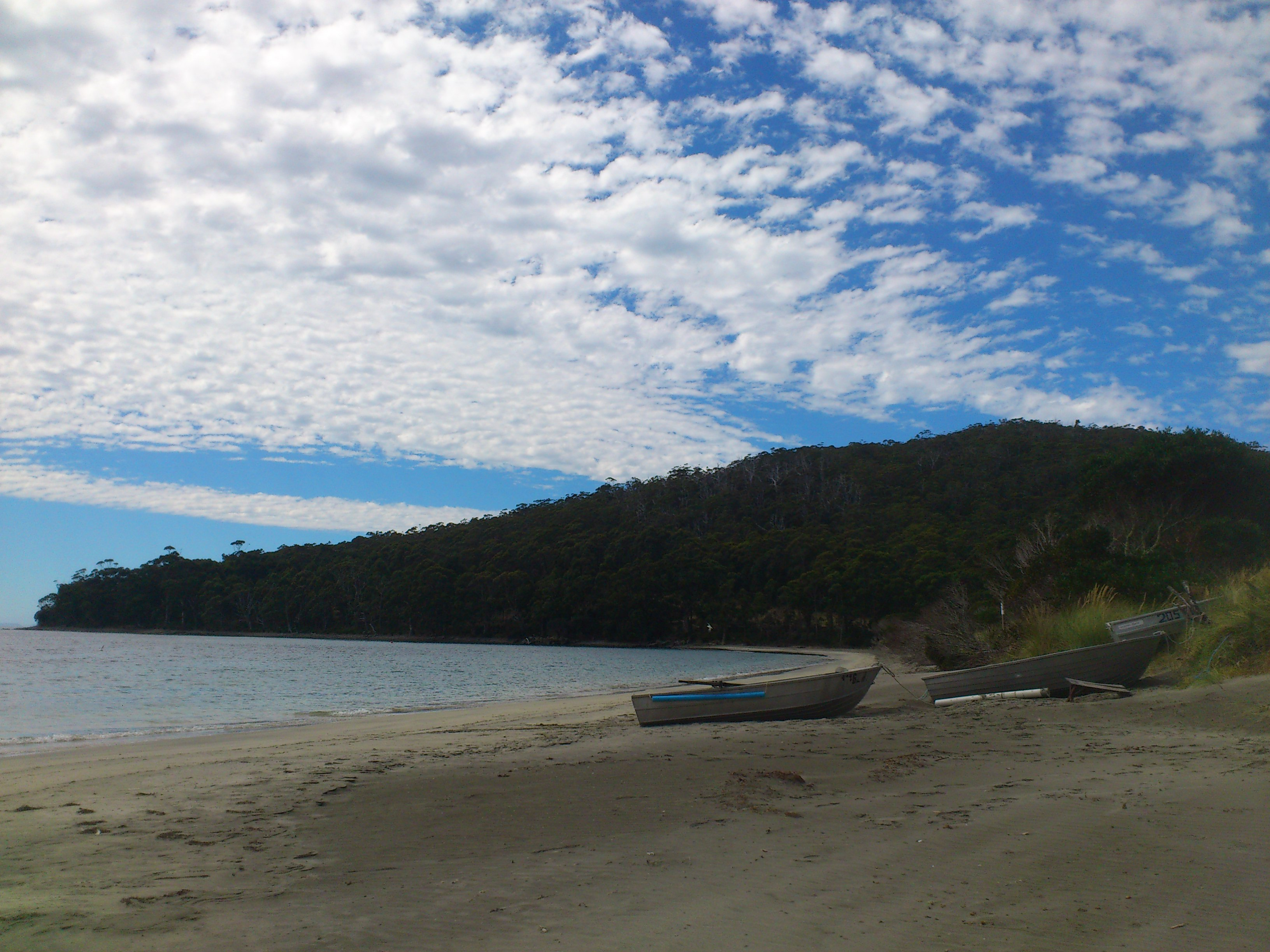
- Adventure Bay

- Coordinates: 43°22′S 147°20′E
- Country: Australia
- State: Tasmania
- LGA: Kingborough Council
- Location: 75 km (47 mi) S of Hobart; 44 km (27 mi) S of Kettering; 41 km (25 mi) S of Dennes Point
- Established: 1798

Government
  - State electorate: Franklin
  - Federal division: Franklin

Population
  - Total: 218 (2021 census)
- Postcode: 7150

Adventure Bay is the name of a locality, a township and a geographical feature on the eastern side of Bruny Island, Tasmania. At the 2021 census, Adventure Bay had a population of 218.

== Early history ==
The first European to sight the bay was explorer Abel Tasman, who sought to anchor his vessel Heemskerck there in 1642. Instead, Heemskerck was driven back offshore by a storm, in token of which Tasman named the place Storm Bay.^{[a]} Captain Tobias Furneaux renamed it in March 1773, in honour of his ship HMS Adventure, which he had anchored in the bay for five days after becoming separated from Captain James Cook's HMS Resolution during Cook's second voyage to the Pacific in search of Terra Australis Incognita.

Furneaux's log made clear the bay was an excellent anchorage for resupplying vessels:

To the SW of the first watering place there is a large lagoon which I believe has plenty of fish in it for one of our Gentlemen caught upwards of 2 dozen trout, and shot a possum which was the only animal we saw. There are a great many gum trees and of a vast thickness and height, one of which measured in circumference 26 feet and the height under the branches was 20 feet."

Others among Furneaux's crew spotted evidence of what they believed were small deer but were more likely kangaroos. Furneaux also noted signs of an Aboriginal settlement in the form of "several huts or wigwams on shore, with several bags of grass in which they carry their shellfish." – but the branches of which the huts were made were "split and torn" and there was "not the least appearance of any people."

Reliably mapped and offering an abundance of fresh water and game, Adventure Bay quickly became a popular anchorage for European explorers. Cook's Resolution watered there in 1777, followed by William Bligh aboard HMS Bounty in 1788 and HMS Providence in 1792. Others who resupplied their vessels in the bay in this period included Bruni d'Entrecasteaux aboard Recherche in 1792 and 1793, and Nicolas Baudin in the corvette Géographe in 1802. Matthew Flinders also tried to enter the bay with Norfolk in 1798. That same year Adventure Bay became the site of whaling and timber stations.

== European settlement ==
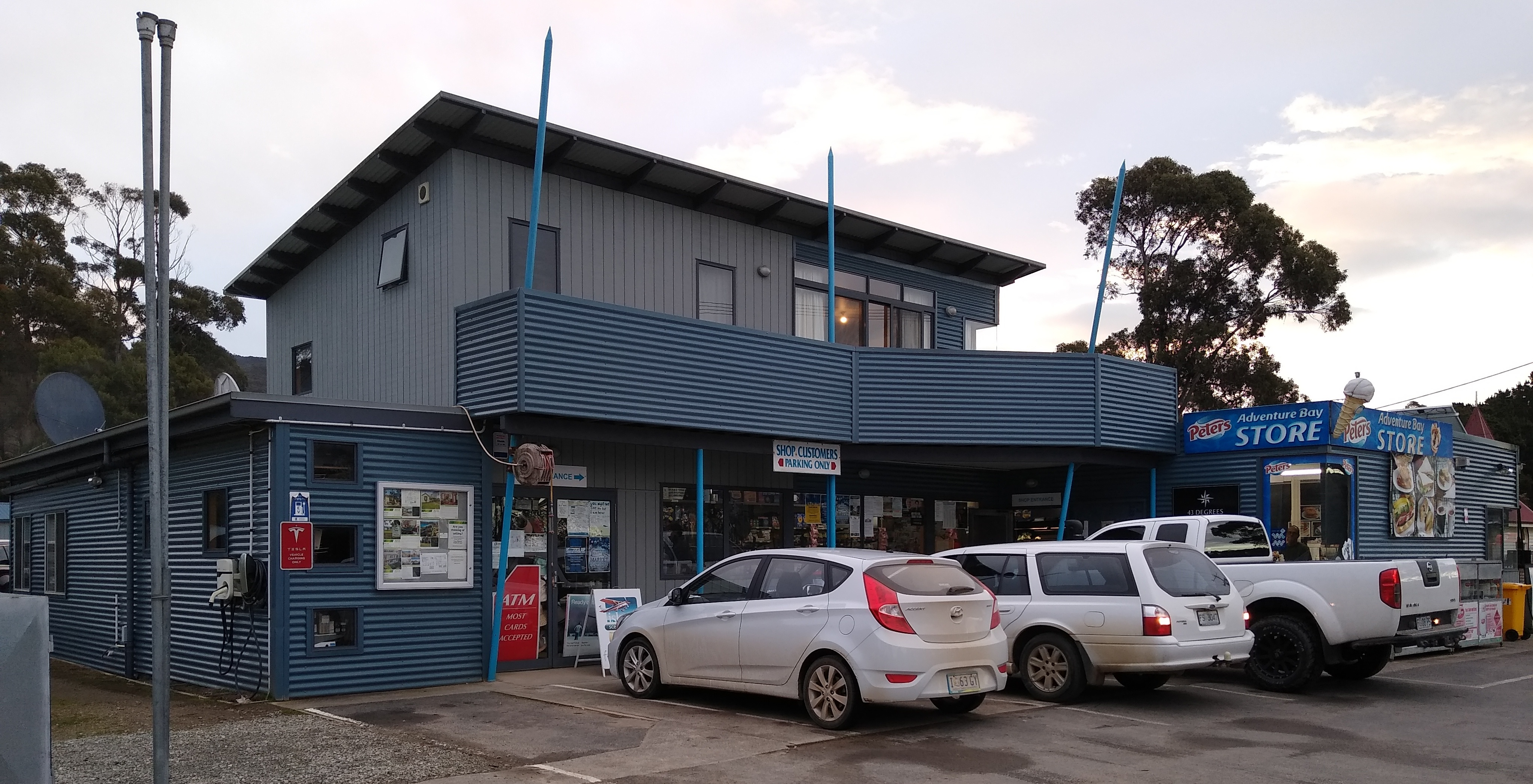
Adventure Bay Store

British whalers were reported in Adventure Bay by 1804. Shore-based whaling stations operated in the bay from 1826 at four separate locations. During the 19th and 20th century Adventure Bay was used by the timber industry. Sheltered from all but strong north-easterly winds, the township of Adventure Bay at the southern end of the bay itself was the site of both extensive timber mills and a long jetty from where seagoing vessels could load timber. Dangerously exposed to north-easterly gales, several ships were driven ashore and wrecked there, the largest being the 241-ton barque Natal Queen in 1909.

Adventure Bay Post Office opened on 1 December 1890 and closed in 1974.

Adventure Bay is now largely a tourist destination. Facilities in town include a general store that sells petrol and a cafe. It is also the location for cruises around the island.

== Notes ==
=== Footnotes ===
^[a]Tasman's name, Storm Bay, survives in describing the larger inlet to the north and northeast of Adventure Bay, containing the mouth of the River Derwent estuary.
