= Apollo Bay, Tasmania =

Apollo Bay
- Town
- Coordinates: 43°09′51″S 147°17′32″E
- Country: Australia
- State: Tasmania
- Region: Hobart
- LGA: Kingborough
- Location: 30 km (19 mi) S of Kingston

Government
  - State electorate: Franklin
  - Federal division: Franklin

Population
  - Total: 38 (SAL 2021)
- Postcode: 7150
Localities around Apollo Bay
D'Entrecasteaux Channel	North Bruny	North Bruny
D'Entrecasteaux Channel	Apollo Bay	North Bruny
D'Entrecasteaux Channel	North Bruny	North Bruny

Apollo Bay is a rural locality on Bruny Island, in the local government area (LGA) of Kingborough in the Hobart LGA region of Tasmania. The locality is about 30 kilometres (19 mi) south of the town of Kingston (by road and ferry). The 2021 census recorded a population of 38 for Apollo Bay.

== History ==
Apollo Bay is a confirmed locality. Anecdotal evidence suggests that Apollo Bay was named after the brig Apollo (105 tons) built in 1826 for Captain J Laughton and which was wrecked in 1827 at the north end of Maria Island.

== Geography ==
The D'Entrecasteaux Channel forms the western boundary, and most of the northern and southern boundaries. Apollo Bay also have a beach located along Apollo Bay Rd, shortly after the turn off to Mulcahys Road. Apollo Bay has two major zones Environmental Living and Rural Resource where existing natural and landscape values are to be retained. It is characterised by native vegetation cover.

== Road infrastructure ==
Route B66 (Lennon Road) passes to the north-east. Access is provided by Apollo Bay Road. Apollo Bay is located approximately 4.5 km from the ferry terminal on Bruny Island making it a short 7 min drive.

== Tourism ==
Apollo Bay is part of Bruny Island but situated along a no-through road meaning tourists rarely explore the locality. Whilst the permanent population in Apollo Bay is small, there are many houses and blocks of land dotted across the area making it a popular holiday destination for locals visiting their "shacks".

Apollo Bay is a close drive to Bruny Island's growing food, wine and tourism businesses, Bruny Island oyster farm, vineyards, smokehouse, the oldest continuous lighthouse (Cape Bruny lighthouse) and breathtaking beaches. The island offers a wide range of tourist adventures which attract local, national and international visitors.

Accommodation in Apollo Bay is limited. Increasingly popular is the opportunity to explore Bruny Island using a hired campervan, via bike or in a car with a tent. There is a campground which sits on land inhabited by the famous eastern quoll (Dasyurus viverrinus) which is thought to be extinct on the Australian mainland.
