= Simpsons Bay, Tasmania =

Simpsons Bay
- Town
- Coordinates: 43°16′43″S 147°17′28″E
- Country: Australia
- State: Tasmania
- Region: Hobart
- LGA: Kingborough
- Location: 9 km (5.6 mi) NE of Alonnah

Government
  - State electorate: Franklin
  - Federal division: Franklin

Population
  - Total: 55 (2016 census)
- Postcode: 7150
Localities around Simpsons Bay
D'Entrecasteaux Channel	D'Entrecasteaux Channel	D'Entrecasteaux Channel
D'Entrecasteaux Channel, Alonnah	Simpsons Bay	D'Entrecasteaux Channel, South Bruny
Alonnah	South Bruny	South Bruny

Simpsons Bay is a rural locality on Bruny Island in the local government area of Kingborough in the Hobart region of Tasmania. It is located about 9 kilometres (5.6 mi) north-east of the town of Alonnah, the largest town on the island. The 2016 census recorded a population of 55 for the state suburb of Simpsons Bay.

== History ==
Simpsons Bay was gazetted as a locality in 1967.

== Geography ==
The D'Entrecasteaux Channel forms much of the western boundary, all of the northern, and most of the eastern.

== Road infrastructure ==
The C628 route (Simpsons Bay Road) enters from the south and runs north to the centre, where it ends.
