= Isthmus Bay (Tasmania) =

Coordinates: 43.25°S 147.32°E

Isthmus Bay is a body of water in South Eastern Tasmania. It is a bay of Bruny Island.

== History ==
Isthmus Bay was discovered on 1 May 1792 by M. de Cretin, of Antoine Bruni d'Entrecasteaux's expedition along the eastern coast of Australia. On 21 May M. de St. Aignon, while searching for an exit from the channel, beached his boat in Isthmus bay, and waded ashore naked holding his gun and his compass.

On 13 February 1793, M. de Well and the geographer M. Beaupre, returned to Isthmus Bay. The French found an abundance of fish in the bay, catching one fish caught weighed 100 lb. and another that weighed 260 lb. The French gave the name "Isthmus Bay+ to the whole of the water now included in the bay of that name, as well as Great Bay. They named the isthmus "St. Aignon" after M. de St. Aignon.
