= Bruny Island Premium Wines =

Winery in Tasmania, Australia

- Location: Bruny Island, Tasmania, Australia
- Coordinates: 43.352979°S 147.236439°E
- Founded: 1998
- Key people: Richard & Bernice Woolley
- Varietals: Pinot noir, Chardonnay
- Other attractions: Farmhouse accommodation
- Distribution: Limited
- Tasting: Cellar door open to public
- Website: http://www.brunyislandwine.com

Bruny Island Premium Wines is Australia's most southern vineyard. It is located in the township of Lunawanna on Bruny Island. The winery produces Pinot noir, Chardonnay & apple cider called J Dillon and Sons Cider on its 120-acre (0.49 km^{2}) estate. A restaurant and accommodation is also offered in a 1900s farmhouse on the property.

== See also ==
- Australian ciders
- Tasmanian wine
- Cult wine
