= Great Bay, Tasmania =

Great Bay Tasmania
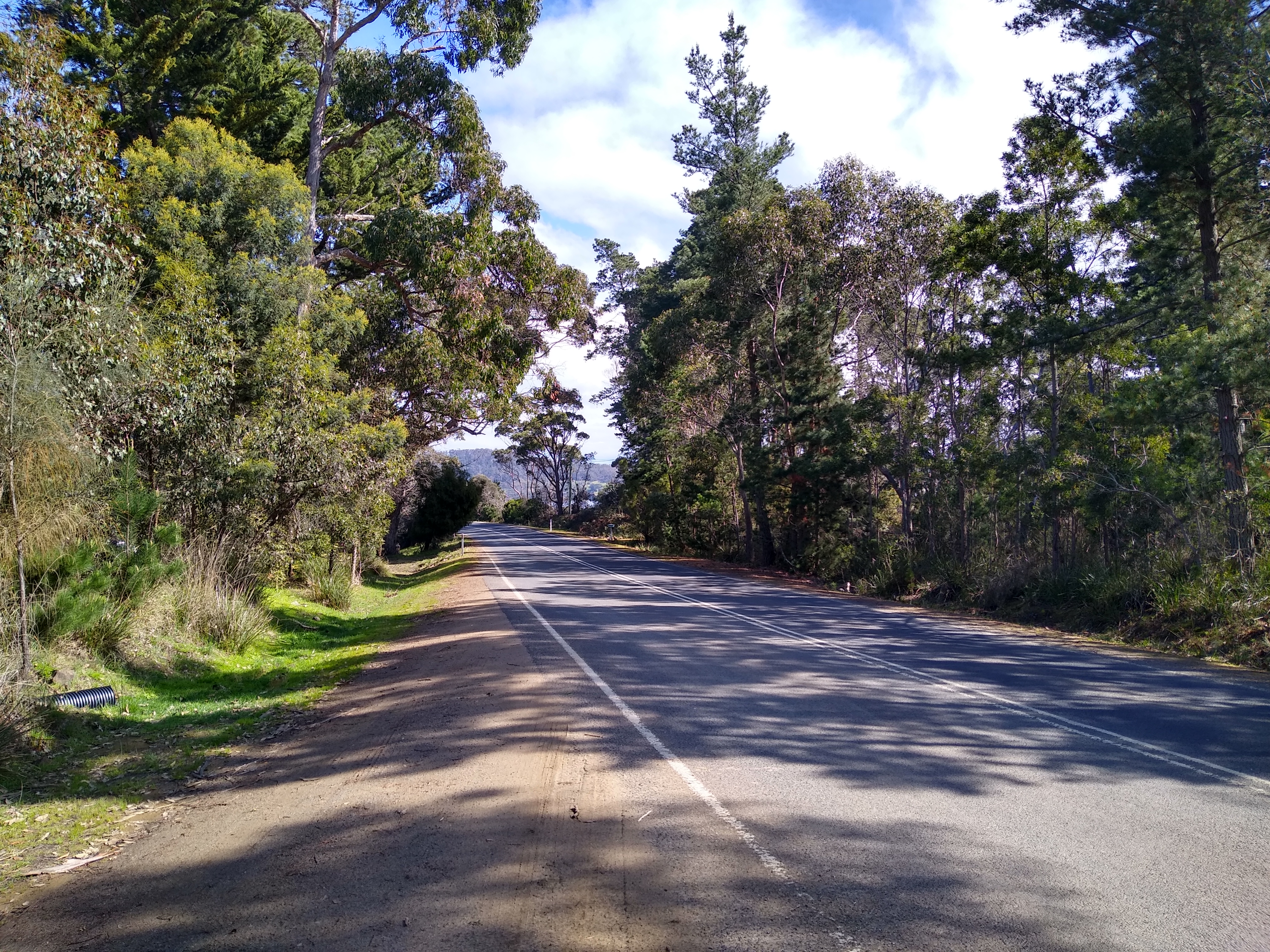
- Bruny Island Main Road in Great Bay, Tasmania

- Coordinates: 43°13′38″S 147°22′38″E
- Population: 57 (2016 census)
- Postcode(s): 7150
- Location: 18 km (11 mi) NE of Alonnah
- LGA(s): Kingborough
- Region: Hobart
- State electorate(s): Franklin
- Federal division(s): Franklin
Localities around Great Bay:
| D'Entrecasteaux Channel | North Bruny | North Bruny |
| D'Entrecasteaux Channel | Great Bay | North Bruny |
| D'Entrecasteaux Channel | North Bruny | North Bruny |

Great Bay is a rural locality on Bruny Island in the local government area of Kingborough in the Hobart region of Tasmania. It is located about 18 kilometres (11 mi) north-east of the town of Alonnah, the largest town on the island. The 2016 census determined a population of 57 for the state suburb of Great Bay. The Bruny Island Airport is located within the suburb of Great Bay.

== History ==
Great Bay is a confirmed suburb/locality. In 1829 the Protector of Aborigines, George Augustus Robinson, set up an Aboriginal settlement near Great Bay (the body of water) on Bruny Island. It was here that Truganini first met Robinson.

== Geography ==
The D'Entrecasteaux Channel forms the western boundary. This includes the southern half of Great Bay (the body of water).

== Road infrastructure ==
The B66 route (Bruny Island Main Road) enters from the north and runs through to the south before exiting.
