= Dennes Point, Tasmania =

Dennes Point
- Town
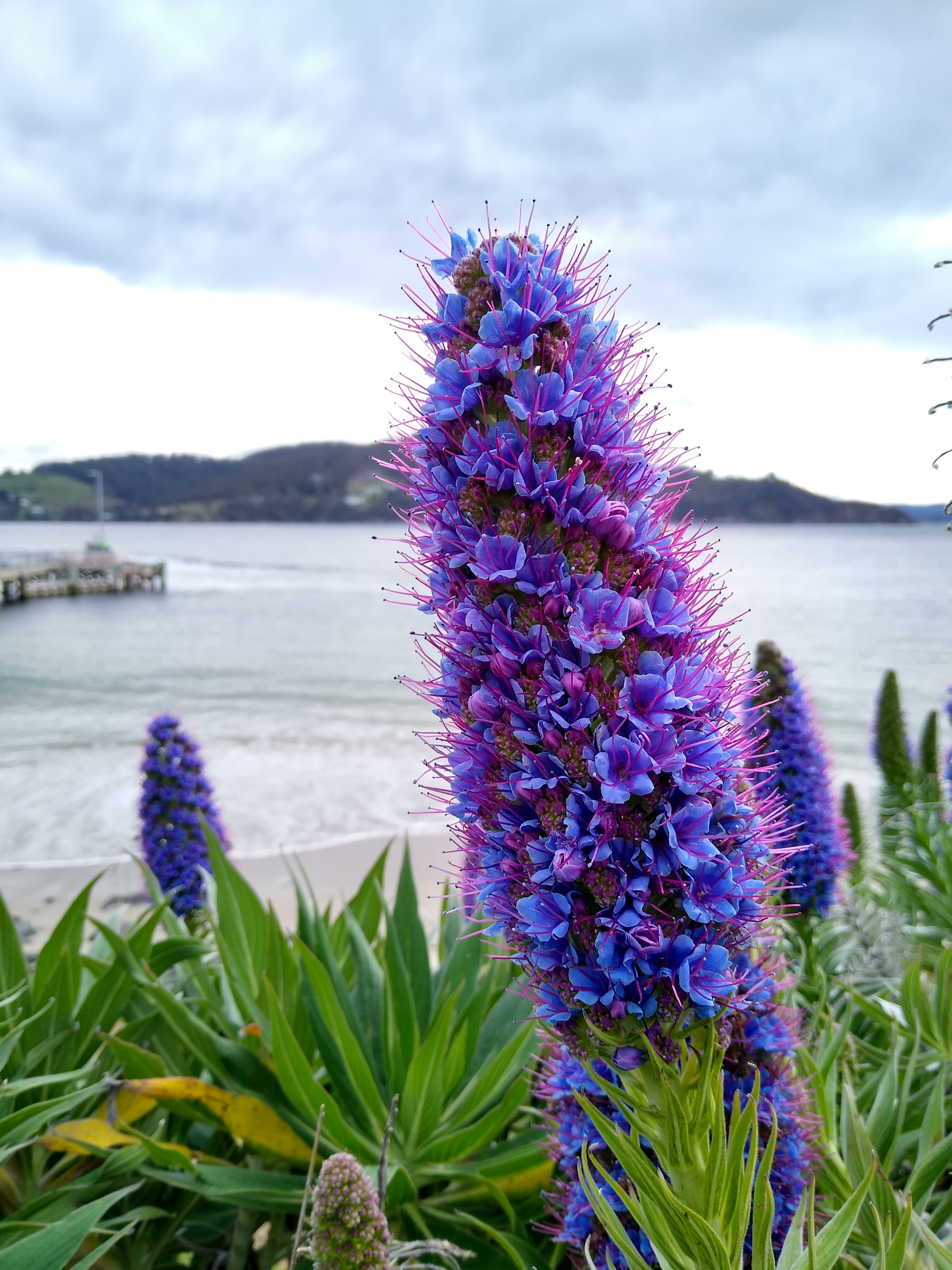

- Coordinates: 43°03′36″S 147°21′00″E
- Country: Australia
- State: Tasmania
- Region: Hobart
- LGA: Kingborough
- Location: 3 km (1.9 mi) NE of Killora

Government
  - State electorate: Franklin
  - Federal division: Franklin
- Elevation: 6 m (20 ft)

Population
  - Total: 49 (2016 census)
- Postcode: 7150
- Mean max temp: 17.2 °C (63.0 °F)
- Mean min temp: 9.7 °C (49.5 °F)
- Annual rainfall: 514.3 mm (20.25 in)
Localities around Dennes Point
D’Entrecasteaux Channel	North Bruny	North Bruny
D’Entrecasteaux Channel	Dennes Point	North Bruny
North Bruny	North Bruny	North Bruny

Dennes Point is a semi-rural locality in the local government area (LGA) of Kingborough in the Hobart LGA region of Tasmania. The locality is about 3 kilometres (1.9 mi) north-east of the town of Killora. The 2016 census recorded a population of 49 for the state suburb of Dennes Point. It is also a geographical feature and a small hamlet at the northern tip of Bruny Island.

== History ==
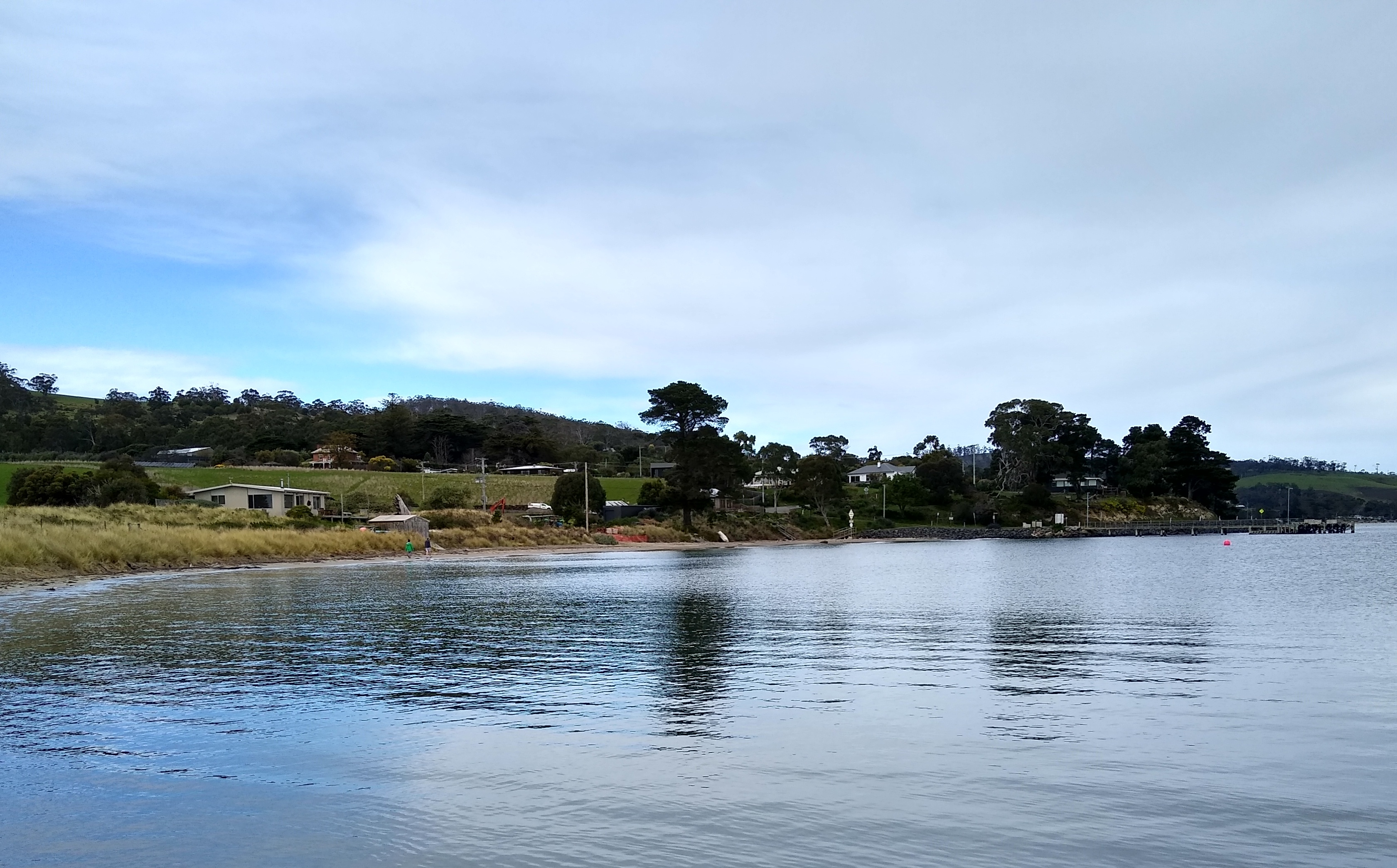
Dennes Point

Dennes Point was gazetted as a locality in 1967. It is named after the Denne family who first settled the area as farmers around the 1830s, although it was known as Kelly's Point up to the 1840s, being named after pioneer shipmaster and harbour pilot James Kelly. Anthony Smith Denne commenced a regular ferry service in 1847 across the D'Entrecasteaux Channel between Tinderbox and "Kelly's" Point, although the island is now serviced by a vehicular ferry between Kettering and Roberts Point. Over the years Dennes Point has seen mixed agricultural activity, mostly orcharding and light grazing.

Its post office opened on 20 August 1941 and closed in 1984.

== Geography ==
The shore of the D’Entrecasteaux Channel forms the western boundary.

=== Climate ===
Dennes Point experiences an oceanic climate (Köppen: Cfb) with pleasant, relatively dry summers and cool, wetter winters. The wettest recorded day was 14 January 2015 with 92.6 mm (3.65 in) of rainfall. Extreme temperatures ranged from 40.5 °C (104.9 °F) on 4 January 2013 to 0.9 °C (33.6 °F) on 3 August 2015.

Climate data for Dennes Point (43.06°S 147.36°E) (6 m (20 ft) AMSL) (2012-2025)
Month	Jan	Feb	Mar	Apr	May	Jun	Jul	Aug	Sep	Oct	Nov	Dec	Year
Record high °C (°F)	40.5 (104.9)	33.7 (92.7)	33.5 (92.3)	30.3 (86.5)	22.6 (72.7)	19.6 (67.3)	18.8 (65.8)	20.6 (69.1)	27.2 (81.0)	30.2 (86.4)	32.4 (90.3)	37.2 (99.0)	40.5 (104.9)
Mean daily maximum °C (°F)	22.1 (71.8)	21.6 (70.9)	20.4 (68.7)	17.9 (64.2)	15.2 (59.4)	13.1 (55.6)	12.8 (55.0)	13.4 (56.1)	15.1 (59.2)	16.6 (61.9)	18.3 (64.9)	20.3 (68.5)	17.2 (63.0)
Mean daily minimum °C (°F)	13.4 (56.1)	13.2 (55.8)	12.3 (54.1)	10.4 (50.7)	8.5 (47.3)	7.1 (44.8)	6.5 (43.7)	6.5 (43.7)	7.6 (45.7)	8.7 (47.7)	10.1 (50.2)	11.7 (53.1)	9.7 (49.4)
Record low °C (°F)	8.1 (46.6)	7.9 (46.2)	6.6 (43.9)	4.4 (39.9)	2.9 (37.2)	1.5 (34.7)	1.5 (34.7)	0.9 (33.6)	1.2 (34.2)	3.4 (38.1)	2.2 (36.0)	5.1 (41.2)	0.9 (33.6)
Average precipitation mm (inches)	31.5 (1.24)	26.7 (1.05)	38.8 (1.53)	32.8 (1.29)	49.7 (1.96)	50.3 (1.98)	46.5 (1.83)	51.6 (2.03)	38.4 (1.51)	55.5 (2.19)	44.3 (1.74)	47.4 (1.87)	514.3 (20.25)
Average precipitation days (≥ 0.2 mm)	7.7	9.0	10.3	11.2	13.6	14.1	14.5	16.0	14.5	13.9	13.0	11.5	149.3
Source: Bureau of Meteorology (2012-2025)

== Road infrastructure ==
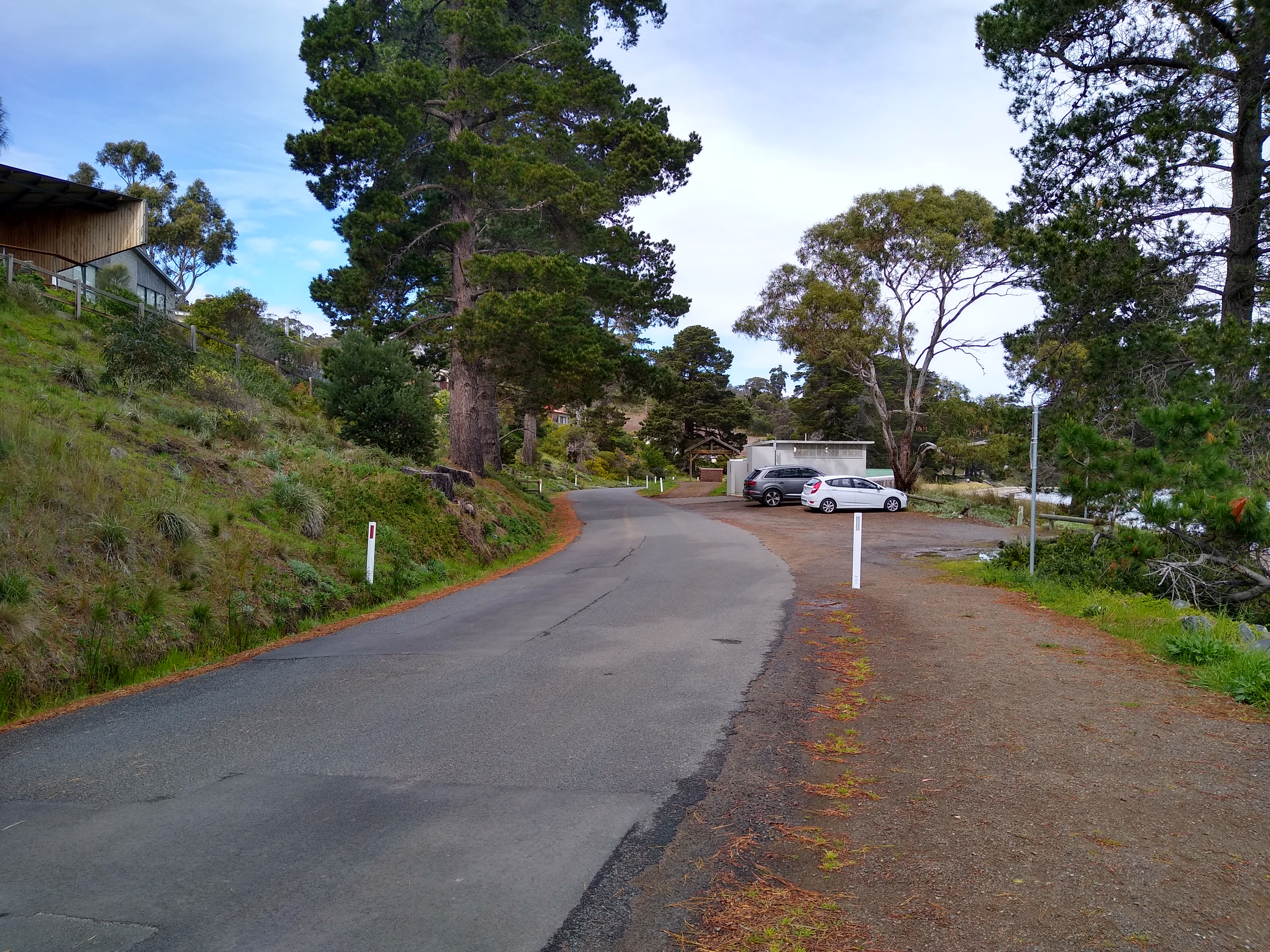
Nebraska Road in Dennes Point

Route C625 (Nebraska Road / Bruny Island Main Road) passes through from south to east.
