= Kingborough Council =

- Local government area
- Interactive map of Kingborough Council
- Coordinates: 43.1932°S 147.2632°E
- Country: Australia
- State: Tasmania
- Region: Kingston and Channel
- Established: 20 August 1907
- Council seat: Kingston

Government
  - Mayor: Paula Wriedt
  - State electorate: Franklin, Clark
  - Federal division: Franklin, Clark

Area
  - Total: 720 km^{2} (280 sq mi)

Population
  - Total: 37,734 (2018)
  - Density: 52.4/km^{2} (135.7/sq mi)
- Website: Kingborough Council
LGAs around Kingborough Council
Glenorchy	Hobart	Hobart
Huon Valley	Kingborough Council	Storm Bay
Huon Valley	Southern Ocean	Southern Ocean

Kingborough Council is a local government body in Tasmania, and one of the five municipalities that constitutes the Greater Hobart Area. Kingborough is classified as an urban local government area and has a population of 37,734, it covers the transition from the southern urban areas of Hobart through Kingston, as well as encompassing Bruny Island.

== Etymology ==
The origin of Kingborough Council is a simple derivation from the name of the main town. The name Kingston was suggested by Mr Lucas in 1851, and the area had been known as Brown's River before then. Why he suggested this name is unknown. Mr Lucas' parents had been raised in England near New Kingston, they had come from Norfolk Island where the capital was Kingston or it might have been named after the Governor of New Norfolk Philip Gidley King.

== History ==
Europeans settled in the Kingborough Council's district in 1808 at Brown's River (Promenalinah), named after Robert Brown, botanist in 1804. The town and district were both known as Brown's River during the earliest periods of settlement. The Lucas family settled the area and built The Red House, a prominent mansion which is now Kingston Golf Club. Early Kingston developed primarily around The Red House. Development of Kingborough was slow and the first post office opened only in the 1840s. The first road to Hobart, Proctors Road, was opened in 1835.

Kingston was proclaimed a town in 1851. The town's name was suggested by the then Police Magistrate, a member of the Lucas family. By 1890 Kingston had a population of 249. When proclaimed on 20 August 1907, the Kingborough Municipality comprised 3 wards: Kingston, Margate and Longley. On 2 April 1993 Kingborough absorbed the former municipality of Bruny.

In 1877 Keen's Curry was invented in the municipality.

The area developed as a holiday area, especially the suburbs of Kingston Beach and Blackmans Bay. Margate and Kettering operated fishing fleets and Taroona had a manufacturing industry, primarily through Taroona Shot Tower. Sandfly became a centre for small fruits and apple orcharding. The decline of the apple industry progressed during the 1960s, but the industry collapsed entirely following the 1967 Tasmanian fires, when much of the municipality was devastated and most orchards burnt down. A memorial to the 62 fatalities of the fire was constructed in Snug following the fire, where 80 of the towns 120 buildings burned and a permanent exhibition is present at the Channel Heritage Centre.

== Current composition ==
Name	Position
Paula Wriedt	Mayor
Clare Glade-Wright	Deputy Mayor
Aldo Antolli	Councillor
David Bain	Councillor
Gideon Cordover	Councillor
Kasper Deane	Councillor
Flora Fox	Councillor
Amanda Midgley	Councillor
Mark Richardson	Councillor
Christian Street	Councillor

== 2022 Election Results ==
2022 Tasmanian local elections: Kingborough
Party	Candidate	Votes	%	±%
Independent Labor	Paula Wriedt (elected)	5,503	23.67	+16.34
Independent	Aldo Antolli (elected)	2,438	10.49	
Independent	Mark Richardson (elected)	2,155	9.27	
Greens	Gideon Cordover (elected)	2,063	8.88	+6.32
Kingborough Thrives	Clare Glade-Wright (elected)	1,946	8.37	
Independent	Kaspar Deane (elected)	1,936	8.33	
Greens	Amanda Midgley (elected)	1,079	4.64	−0.42
Independent	Christian Street (elected)	941	4.05	+0.97
Independent	David Bain (elected)	911	3.92	
Independent	Flora Fox (elected)	877	3.77	−0.62
Kingborough Thrives	Jill Hickie	803	3.45	
Kingborough Thrives	Di Carter	767	3.30	
Independent	David McQuillan	592	2.55	
Independent	Kate Lucas	493	2.12	+0.96
Independent	Michael Rowan	461	1.98	
Independent	Alex Jensen	279	1.20	
Total formal votes		23,244	96.58	+1.40
Informal votes		824	3.42	−1.40
Turnout		24,068	86.32	+28.67

== Demographics ==
Localities and smaller towns of the region include Taroona, Kettering, Margate, Snug, Blackmans Bay and Woodbridge. Kingston is classified as urban, fringe and medium (UFM) under the Australian Classification of Local Governments.

== Localities ==
=== Hobart suburbs ===
• Blackmans Bay • Bonnet Hill • Howden • Huntingfield • Kingston • Kingston Beach • Taroona

=== Other localities ===
• Adventure Bay • Allens Rivulet • Alonnah • Apollo Bay • Barnes Bay • Barretta • Birchs Bay • Coningham • Dennes Point • Electrona • Fern Tree • Flowerpot • Garden Island Creek • Gordon • Great Bay • Kaoota • Kettering • Killora • Leslie Vale • Longley • Lower Longley • Lower Snug • Lunawanna • Margate • Middleton • Mount Nelson • Neika • North Bruny • Oyster Cove • Pelverata • Sandfly • Simpsons Bay • Snug • South Bruny • Tinderbox • Wellington Park • Woodbridge

== See also ==
- Local government areas of Tasmania
