= Killora, Tasmania =

Killora Tasmania
- Coordinates: 43°05′39″S 147°19′24″E
- Population: n/a (2016 census)
- Postcode(s): 7150
- Location: 39 km (24 mi) N of Alonnah
- LGA(s): Kingborough
- Region: Hobart
- State electorate(s): Franklin
- Federal division(s): Franklin
Localities around Killora:
D'Entrecasteaux Channel	North Bruny	North Bruny
D'Entrecasteaux Channel	Killora	North Bruny
D'Entrecasteaux Channel	North Bruny	North Bruny

Killora is a rural locality on Bruny Island in the local government area of Kingborough in the Hobart region of Tasmania. It is located about 39 kilometres (24 mi) north of the town of Alonnah, the largest town on the island. The 2016 census has no population information for the state suburb of Killora.

== History ==
Killora was gazetted as a locality in 1971.

== Geography ==
The D'Entrecasteaux Channel forms the western boundary.

== Road infrastructure ==
The C625 route (Killora Road) enters from the north and runs through to the south.
