= Bruny Island =

Island off the coast of Tasmania

Bruny
Native name: Lunawanna Allonah
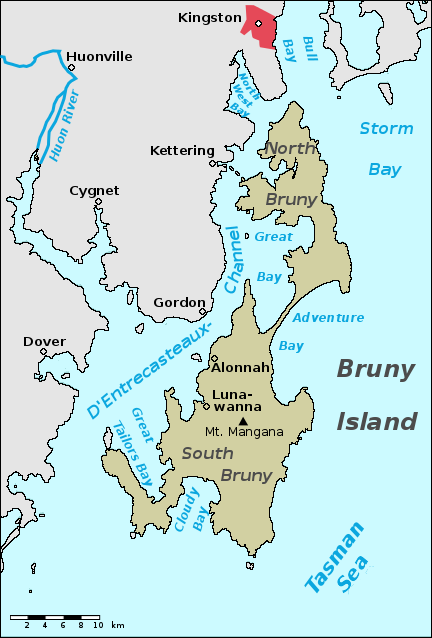

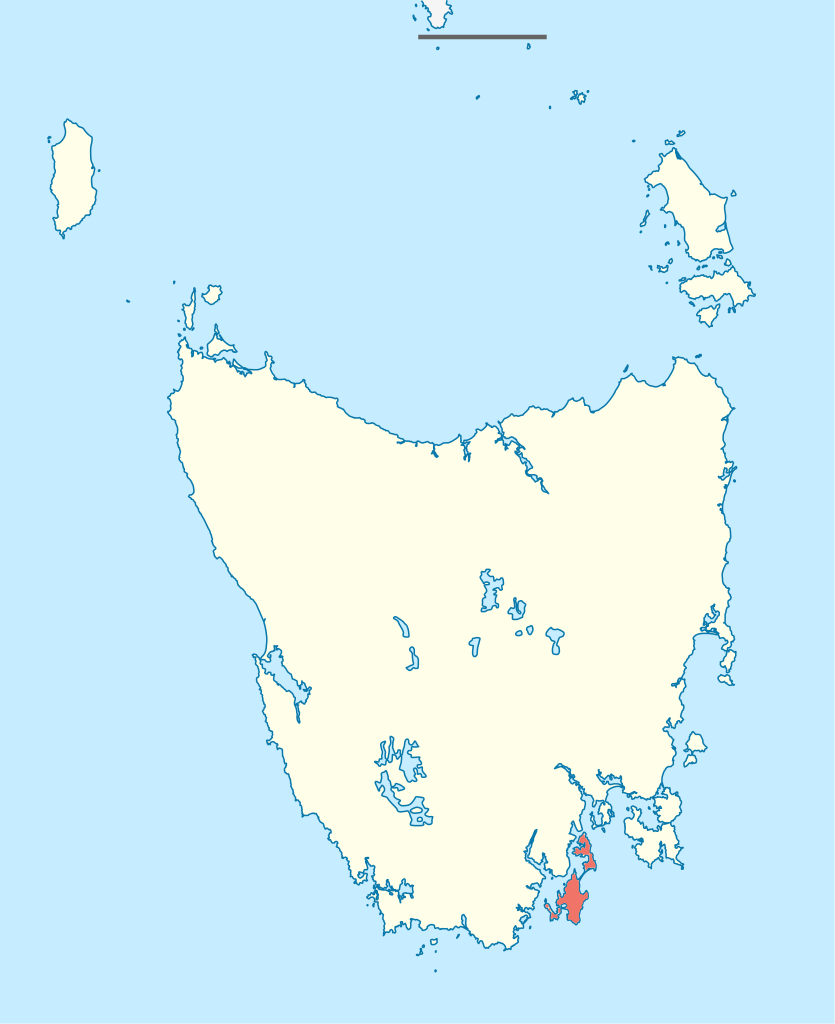
- Location of the Bruny Island in Tasmania
- Etymology: Bruni d'Entrecasteaux

Geography
- Location: Tasman Sea
- Coordinates: 43°18′S 147°18′E
- Total islands: 2
- Area: 362 km^{2} (140 sq mi)
- Highest elevation: 571 m (1873 ft)
- Highest point: Mount Mangana

Administration
- Australia
- State: Tasmania
- LGA: Kingborough Council

Demographics
- Population: 1008 (2021 Census)
- Pop. density: 1.6/km^{2} (4.1/sq mi)

Additional information
- Official website: www.brunyisland.org.au

Bruny Island is a 362-square-kilometre (140 sq mi) coastal island of Tasmania, Australia, located at the mouths of the River Derwent and Huon River estuaries on Storm Bay on the Tasman Sea, south of Hobart. The island is separated from the mainland by the D'Entrecasteaux Channel. The island and the channel are named after French explorer Antoine Bruni d'Entrecasteaux.

The island's Aboriginal name is lunawanna-allonah, from which the island settlements of Alonnah and Lunawanna are named.

== History ==
Bruny Island was inhabited by Aboriginal Tasmanians people. Some people living on the island identify as being of Aboriginal descent. Abel Tasman was the first recorded European to sight the island, in November 1642 but did not determine it was an island. On 11 March 1773, Tobias Furneaux was the first British explorer to reach the island and his ship anchored at Adventure Bay (named after his ship) for four days and the crew ascertained the land was an island. Four years later, on 26 January 1777, James Cook's two ships, the Resolution and Discovery stayed in the bay area for two days. Cook carved his initials in a tree that was destroyed in a 1905 bushfire and is now commemorated by a plaque. In 1788 and again in 1792 with Matthew Flinders, William Bligh stayed in the Adventure Bay area.

The island is named after the French explorer Bruni d'Entrecasteaux, who explored the channel region in 1792. It was known as Bruni Island until 1918, when the spelling was changed to Bruny.

Whaling was conducted off the coast of Bruny Island in the first half of the 19th century. The British whaler, Alexander, was reported to be whaling in Adventure Bay in 1804. In 1805, the British whalers Richard and Mary, Ocean and the Sydney whaler King George were reported there in the winter months. The American whaler Topaz was there in 1807. Colonial entrepreneurs also operated shore-based whaling stations there. Bethune and Kelly had a station operating in Adventure Bay by August 1826. Kelly and Lucas had another at Bull Bay. Young and Walford had one at Trumpeter Bay. Alexander Imlay applied for a site as a whaling station at Cloudy Bay in 1837, and Brown and Rogers did the same in 1842. These stations had all ceased operating by 1850, although whaling vessels sometimes anchored offshore in the second half of the century.

Even though "Cooktown" was marked on maps as early as the 1840s, the island was not officially opened up to European settlement until the late 1800s when the timber industry took off. South Bruny was opened up by numerous tramways and haulages, some horse-drawn and some using modified locomotives. The longest and best-preserved tramway runs from Adventure Bay to the far southeast corner of the island. Almost all settlements on South Bruny were originally opened as timber ports, owned by the different timber companies operating on the island. Lunawanna (formerly Daniels Bay), Alonnah (formerly Mills Reef) and Adventure Bay were some of the largest ports operating on the island. At Daniels Bay, the settlement was separated from the timber jetty as the tramway was forced to trace along the south side of the bay in order to reach deep water, as most of Daniels Bay was too shallow to bring boats in. Most settlements of South Bruny now serve as shack towns or holiday locations.

Since the 1920s, the island has become known as a holiday location with surfing beaches, National Parks and historical sites. In more recent history the Bruny Island was the site of a land transfer by the state government to local Aboriginal people.

== Geography ==
Geologically, Bruny Island actually consists of two land masses—North Bruny and South Bruny—that are joined by a long, narrow, sandy isthmus, often referred to as "The Neck". The island has a total length of approximately 50 kilometres (30 miles). The holiday village of Dennes Point is located in North Bruny, while South Bruny is the site of the towns of Alonnah, Adventure Bay, and Lunawanna.

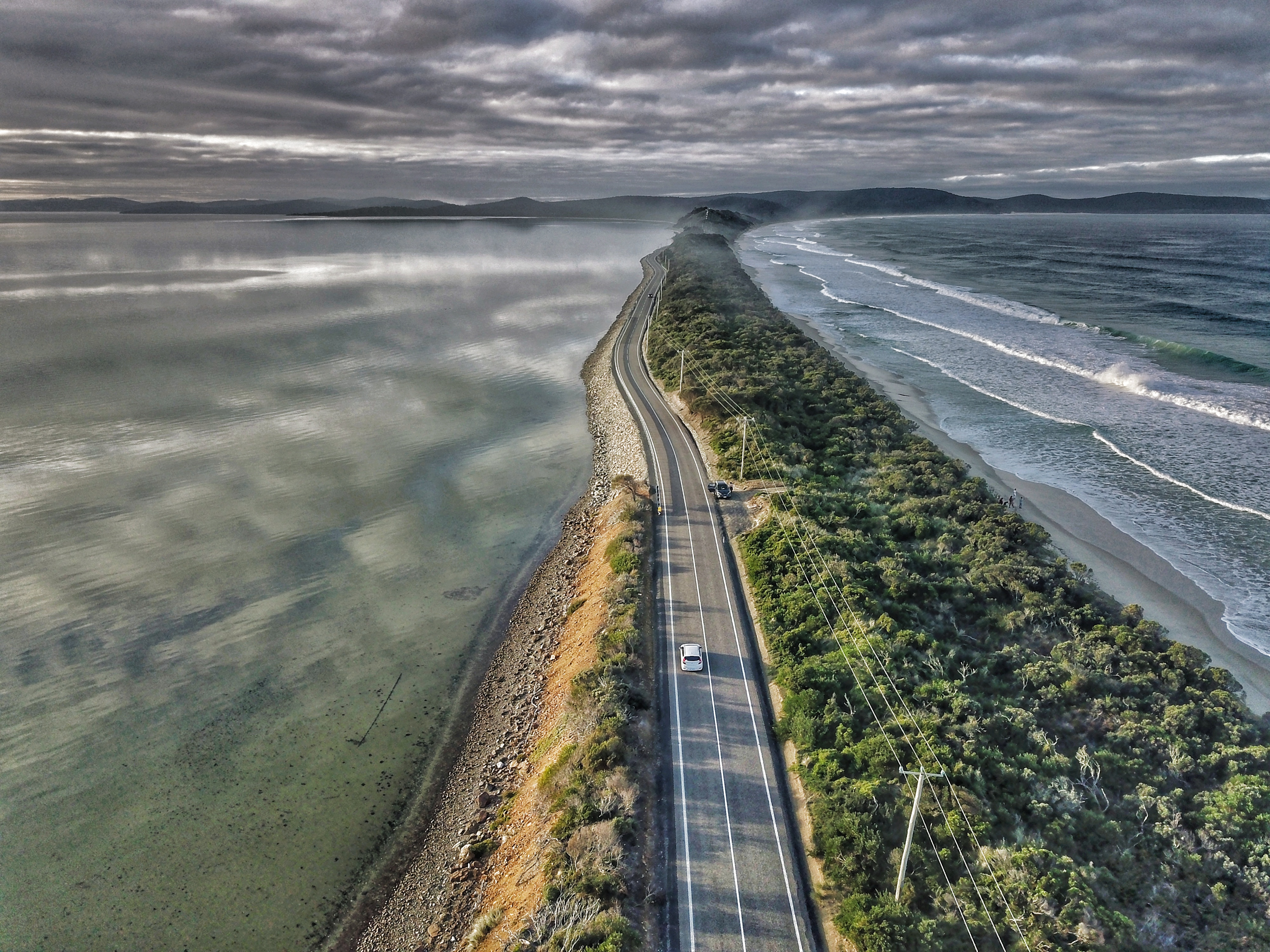
Aerial perspective of the isthmus of Bruny Island, looking north

Outside its settlements, the island is covered with grazing fields and large tracts of dry eucalyptus forest. Inland forests have been logged, but other large sections—mostly along the southeastern coast—are preserved as the South Bruny National Park. While the seaward side of the island features two long beaches—Adventure Bay and Cloudy Bay—it is for the most part extremely rugged, with cliffs of dolerite over 200 metres (660 ft) AHD in altitude. Bruny's channel side is more sheltered and a favourite fishing and recreational boating area for local and interstate visitors. Adventure Bay is located on the eastern side of the isthmus, while Isthmus Bay is located on the western side.

Access to the island is by vehicular ferry, funded by the State Government. Since 1954, four vessels have operated the Bruny Island Ferry service between the island and Kettering on the mainland. The service currently uses the vessel, Mirambeena, which is plied by a Voith-Schneider propulsion system rather than a conventional propeller. There is a public airfield, Bruny Island Airport located on North Bruny, just north of The Neck, however the small runway is mostly suited to small aircraft, and there are no scheduled flights.

The d'Entrecastaux Channel region, sheltered by Bruny Island, is increasingly subject to foreshore erosion. Some areas have begun sandbagging to reduce the effects.

=== Climate ===
Bruny Island has a cool oceanic climate (Köppen: Cfb) with short, cool summers and chilly, wet winters with snowfalls. The island is near-constantly buffeted by cold fronts off the Roaring Forties, even through the height of summer. The island is very windy with a mean 3 pm wind speed of 27.8 km/h (17.3 mph); cloud cover is likewise great, with 242 cloudy days and 19.2 clear days annually. Rain falls on an average of 200 days a year.

An extreme event on 15 November 2021 saw a fall of snow to beach level on the island, though historical temperature data indicate this may have also happened prior to that event − and perhaps even in the early summer.

Climate data for Cape Bruny Lighthouse (1991–2020, extremes 1923–2026); 43.49° S, 147.15° E
Month	Jan	Feb	Mar	Apr	May	Jun	Jul	Aug	Sep	Oct	Nov	Dec	Year
Record high °C (°F)	39.3 (102.7)	39.0 (102.2)	39.7 (103.5)	28.7 (83.7)	24.5 (76.1)	20.0 (68.0)	19.1 (66.4)	22.4 (72.3)	26.5 (79.7)	31.4 (88.5)	35.0 (95.0)	39.2 (102.6)	39.7 (103.5)
Mean daily maximum °C (°F)	19.1 (66.4)	19.1 (66.4)	18.0 (64.4)	16.0 (60.8)	14.1 (57.4)	12.2 (54.0)	11.8 (53.2)	12.4 (54.3)	13.7 (56.7)	14.9 (58.8)	16.2 (61.2)	17.7 (63.9)	15.4 (59.8)
Mean daily minimum °C (°F)	12.3 (54.1)	12.4 (54.3)	11.6 (52.9)	10.0 (50.0)	8.7 (47.7)	7.1 (44.8)	6.6 (43.9)	6.5 (43.7)	7.4 (45.3)	8.3 (46.9)	9.7 (49.5)	10.7 (51.3)	9.3 (48.7)
Record low °C (°F)	1.7 (35.1)	2.8 (37.0)	1.7 (35.1)	0.3 (32.5)	0.0 (32.0)	−1.4 (29.5)	−1.7 (28.9)	−2.2 (28.0)	−2.0 (28.4)	−1.7 (28.9)	0.6 (33.1)	0.6 (33.1)	−2.2 (28.0)
Average precipitation mm (inches)	57.1 (2.25)	57.3 (2.26)	64.8 (2.55)	68.7 (2.70)	76.5 (3.01)	81.7 (3.22)	90.1 (3.55)	108.2 (4.26)	81.6 (3.21)	76.2 (3.00)	67.8 (2.67)	65.9 (2.59)	895.9 (35.27)
Average precipitation days (≥ 0.2 mm)	13.2	12.7	15.2	15.6	17.4	17.5	19.2	20.5	18.3	18.7	16.2	15.6	200.1
Average afternoon relative humidity (%)	70	70	70	72	73	76	75	71	69	70	71	71	71
Average dew point °C (°F)	11.0 (51.8)	11.3 (52.3)	10.4 (50.7)	8.9 (48.0)	7.8 (46.0)	6.7 (44.1)	6.2 (43.2)	5.6 (42.1)	6.1 (43.0)	7.4 (45.3)	8.7 (47.7)	9.8 (49.6)	8.3 (47.0)
Source 1: Cape Bruny Lighthouse (means 1991–2020, extremes 1923–2021)
Source 2: Cape Bruny (extremes 1997–2026)

== Environment ==
Bruny Island is classified by BirdLife International as an Important Bird Area because it supports the world's largest population of the endangered forty-spotted pardalote, up to a third of the world population of the swift parrot, all 12 of Tasmania's endemic bird species, and up to 240,000 breeding pairs of the short-tailed shearwater (or Tasmanian muttonbird). In March 2021, awareness increased concerning the feral cat population on the island, which had been steadily growing over the last decade. Local residents opened an inquiry into the sudden large number of feral cats, concerned this spike in numbers may have adverse affects on the environment and wildlife. Initial findings suggest the feral cats migrated from the Eastern Shore of Tasmania, namely the Howrah/Tranmere region.An alternative view taken by some wildlife ecologists is that cats are a naturalized alien species in much of Australia, and the best approach available at present to conserve species on which they predate is to ensure adequately large and intact habitats. Invasive cats may be eradicated on small islands, but some believe complete eradication is impractical at present on islands the size of Bruny. Control methodologies alternative to complete eradication are currently being investigated.Multiple vegetation types are seen across the island, including wet sclerophyll forest, coastal healthland and dry sclerophyll forests.

== Tourism ==
A key contributor to Bruny Island's economy is its growing tourism industry. Being home to the South Bruny National Park, tourism on the island centres on the showcase of its natural assets. The Cape Bruny Lighthouse, first lit in 1838, is an iconic Australian lighthouse. It was the third lighthouse built in Tasmania, and the fourth in all of Australia, and was the longest continuously staffed lighthouse in the country until it was automated in 1993. It was removed from service in 1996, and became part of the South Bruny National Park in 2000. Guided tours of the structure are available. In 2010/11, overall visitors to Bruny Island increased 4% to 74,600. The island is primarily a day-trip destination with only 21,800 visitors staying on the island overnight. There are a growing number of tourism businesses on the island including a cheese factory, oyster farm, vineyard, smoke-house, lighthouse, museum, art gallery, two eco-cruises along with various accommodation properties and cafes.

== Localities ==
Bruny Island is divided into eleven bounded localities. The two largest by area are North Bruny and South Bruny which consist of national park, state forest and some grazing areas and do not have postcodes. On North Bruny, there are five populated coastal enclaves: Apollo Bay, Barnes Bay, Dennes Point, Great Bay and Killora. On South Bruny, there are four: Adventure Bay, Alonnah, Lunawanna and Simpsons Bay.

== Gallery ==
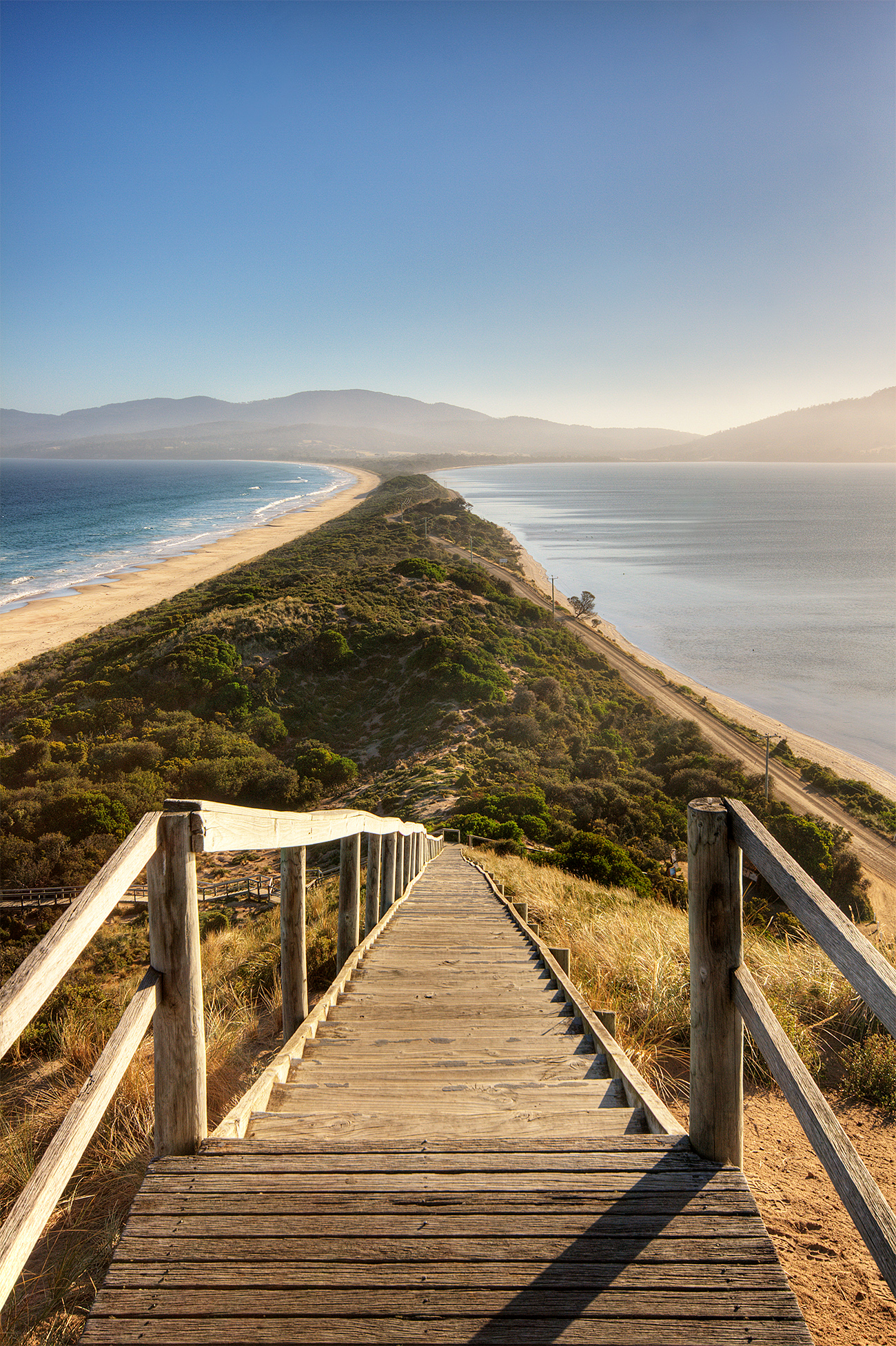
"The Neck" connects the two halves of Bruny Island and is an important breeding site for short-tailed shearwater and fairy penguins

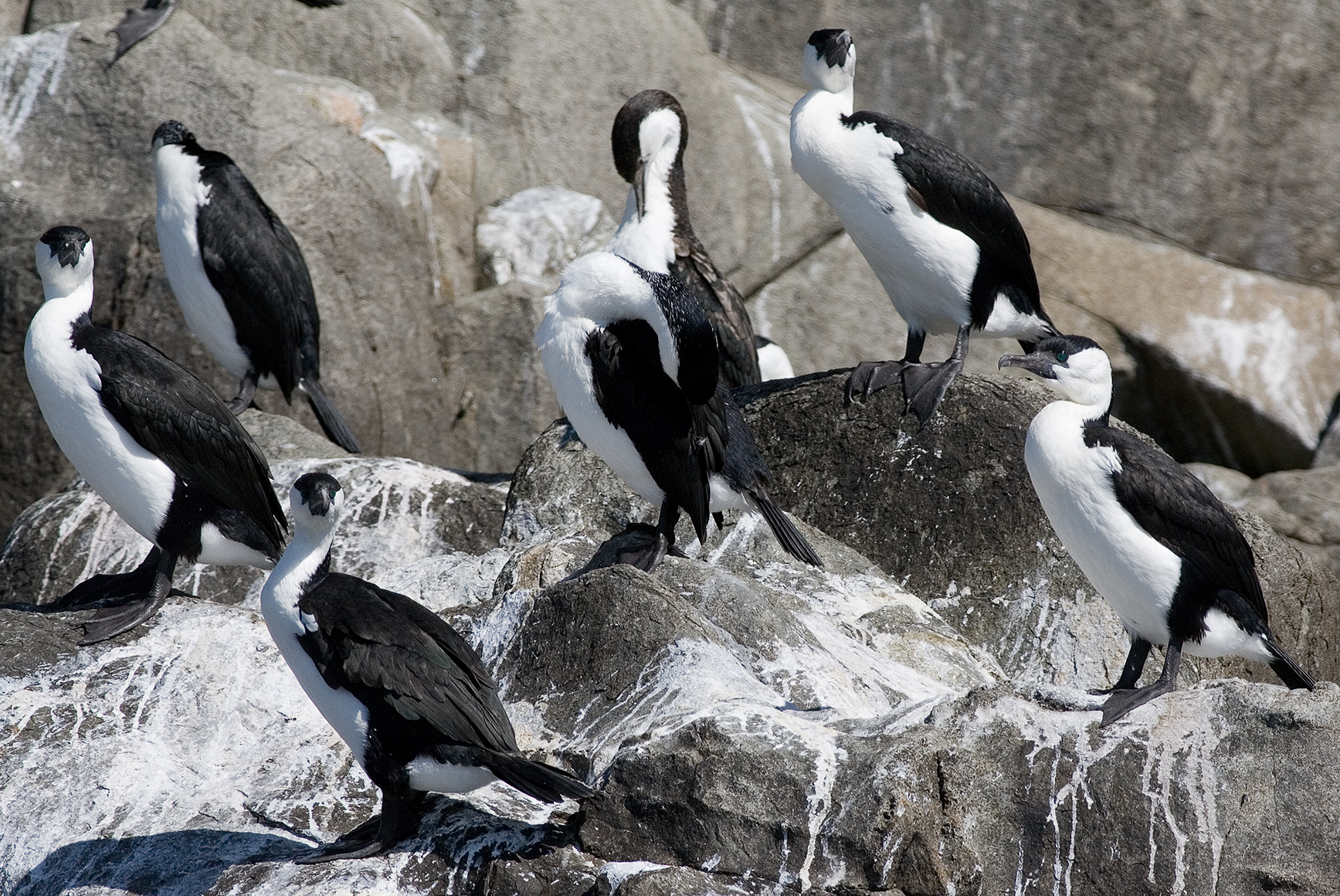
Black-faced cormorants (Phalacrocorax fuscescens), Bruny Island, Tasmania

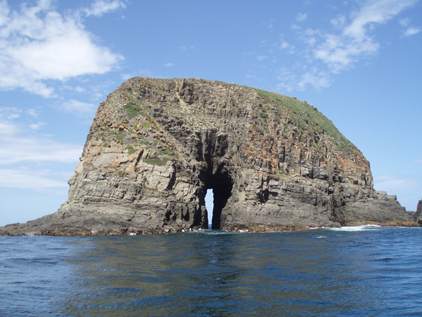
Rock formation off the coast of Bruny Island

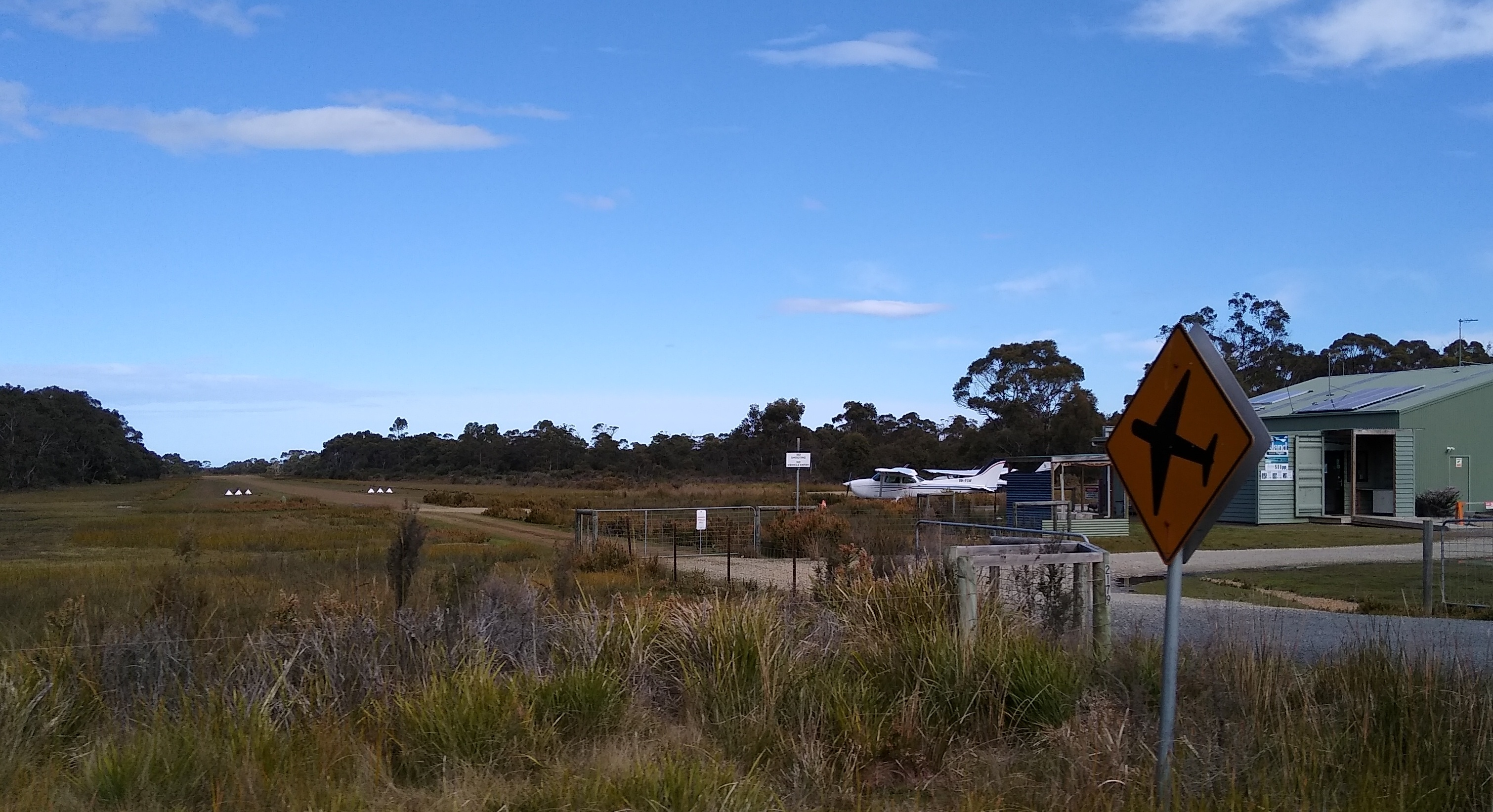
Bruny Island airport

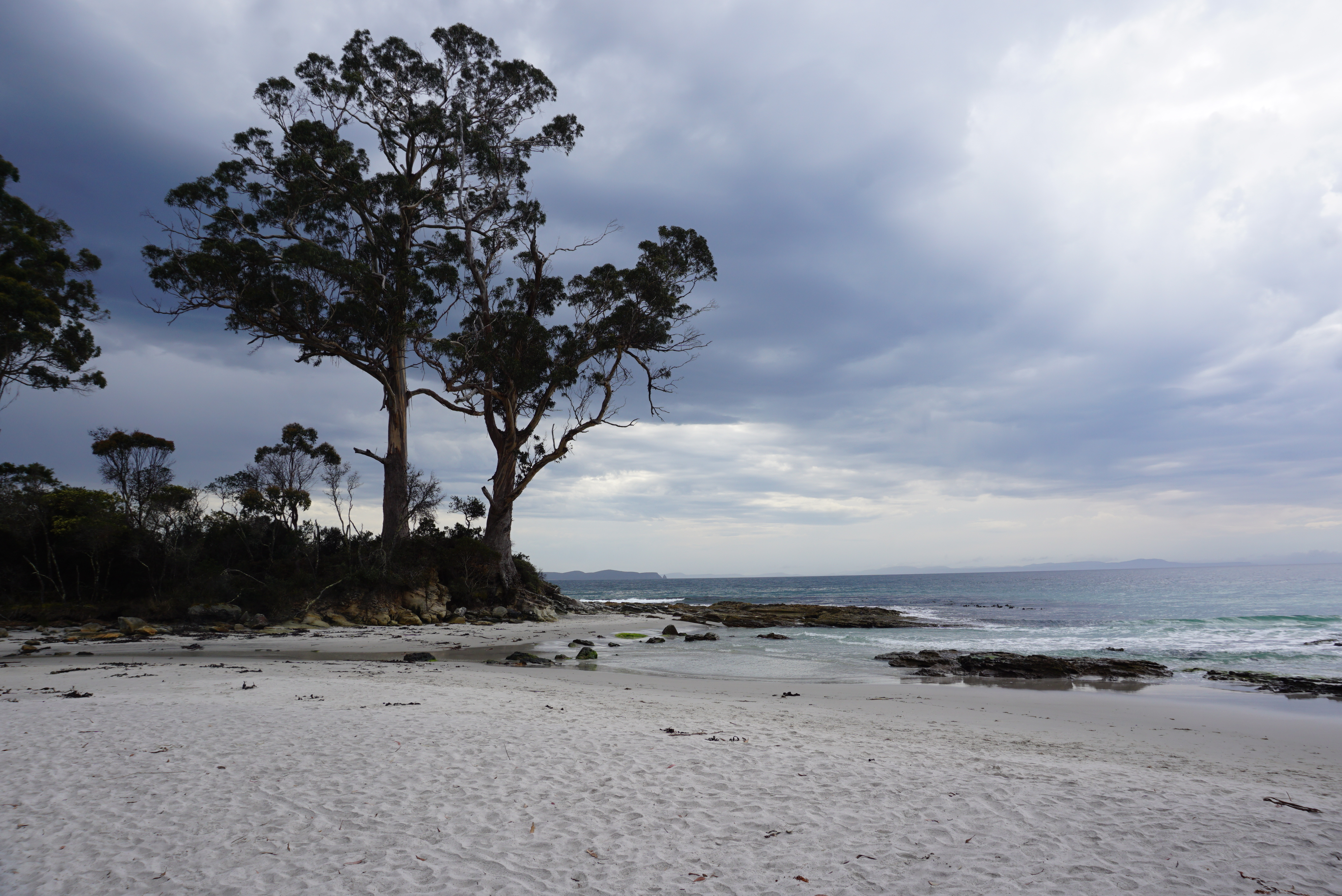
Shore of Bruny Island

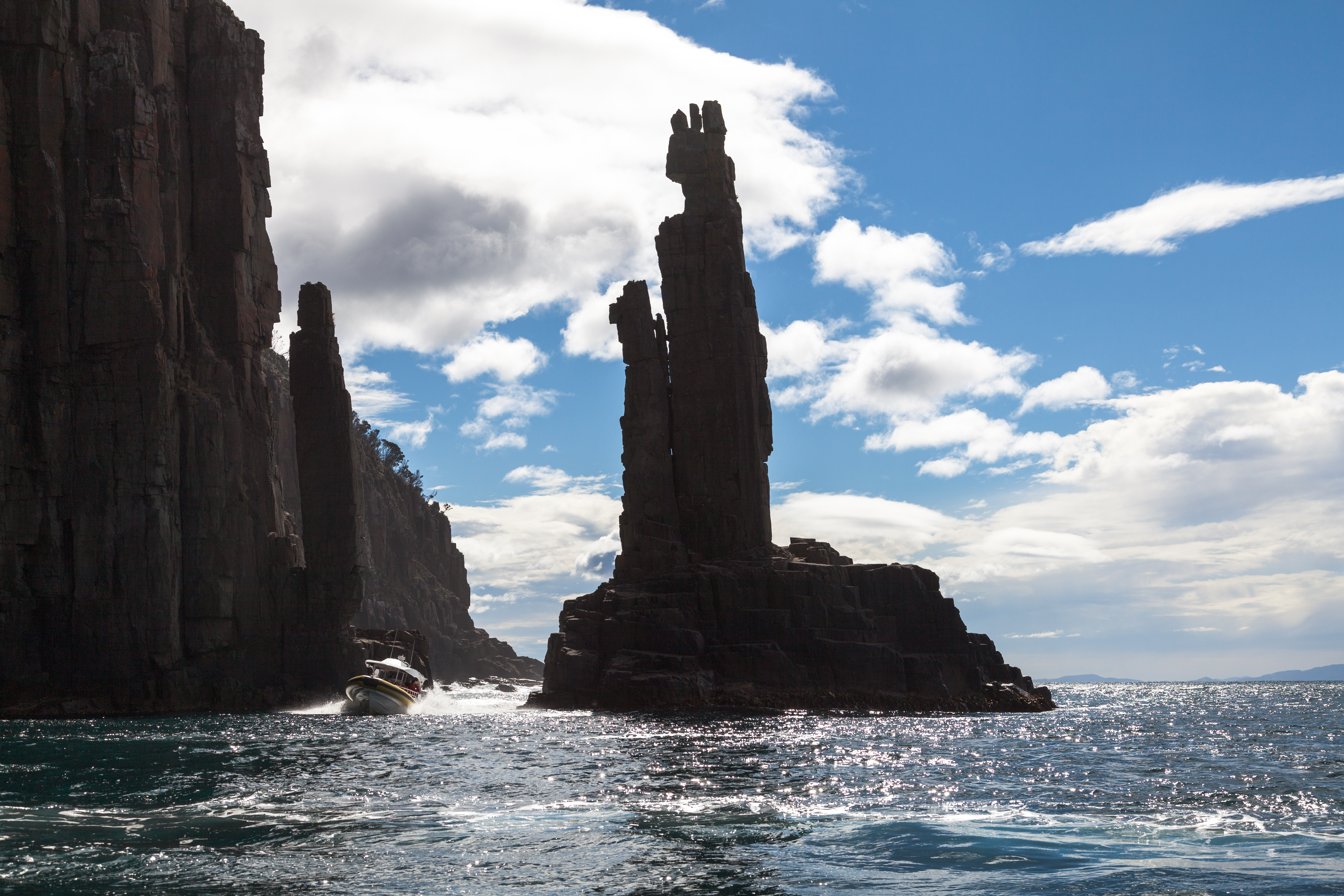
Rock pillars from Bruny Island

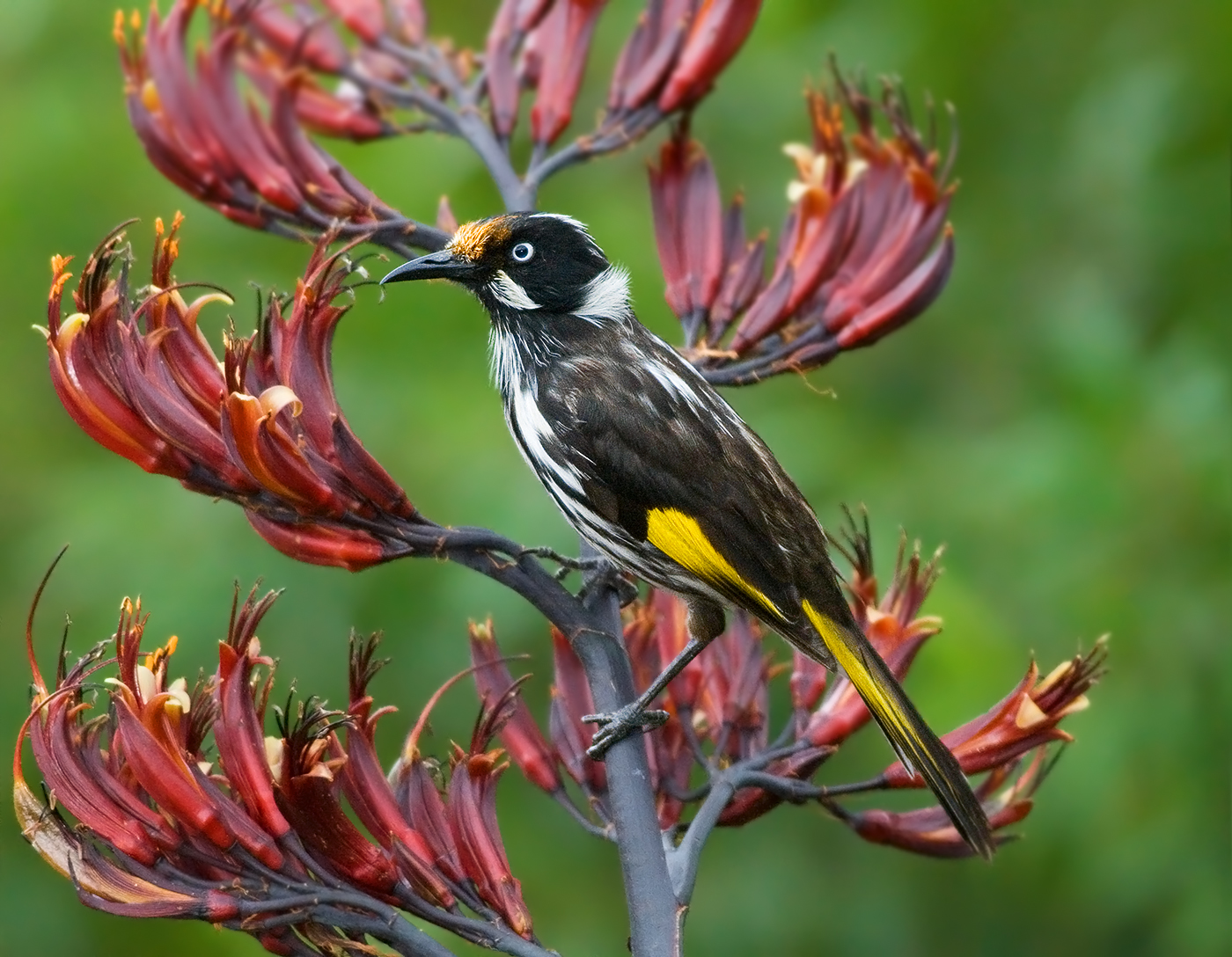

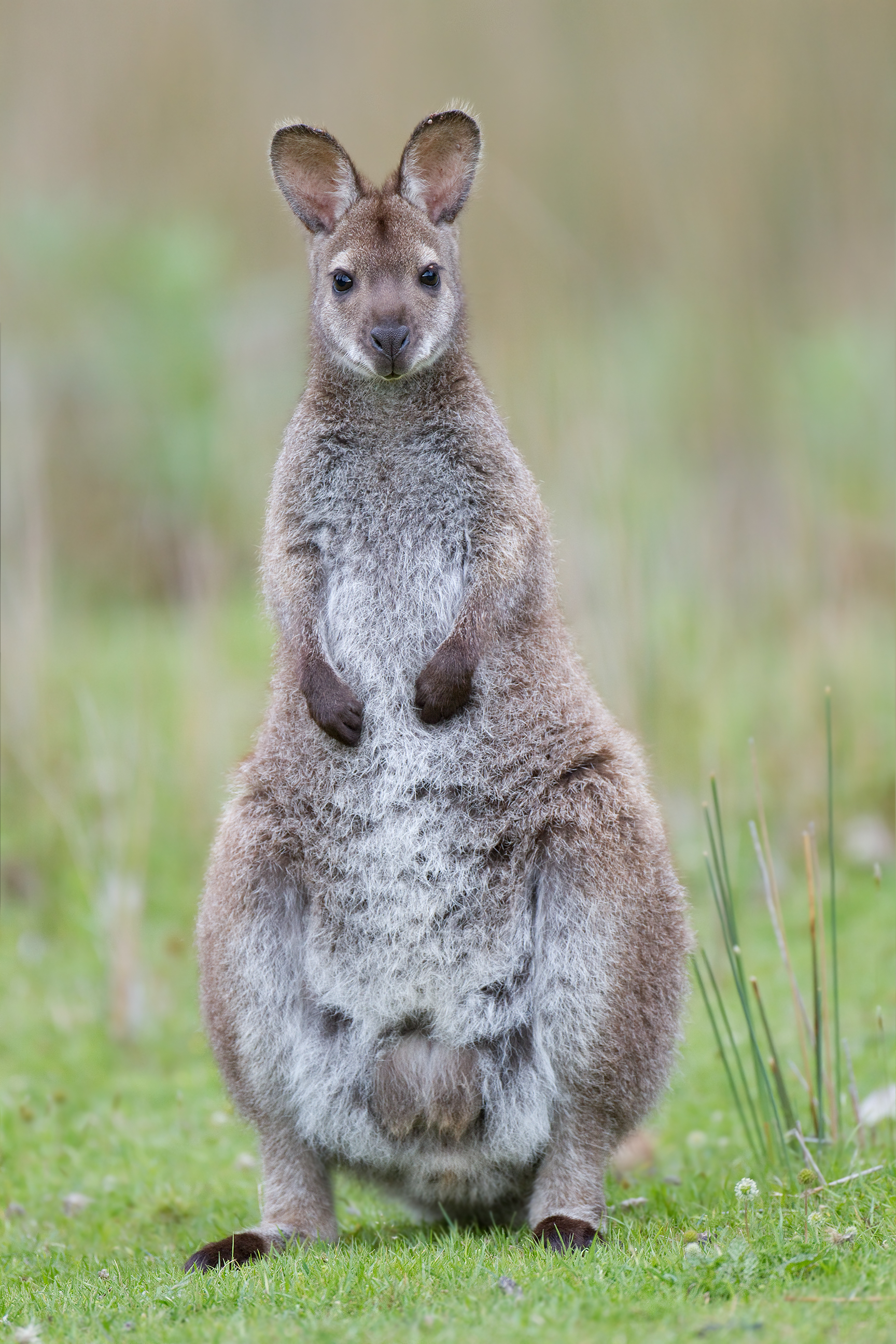

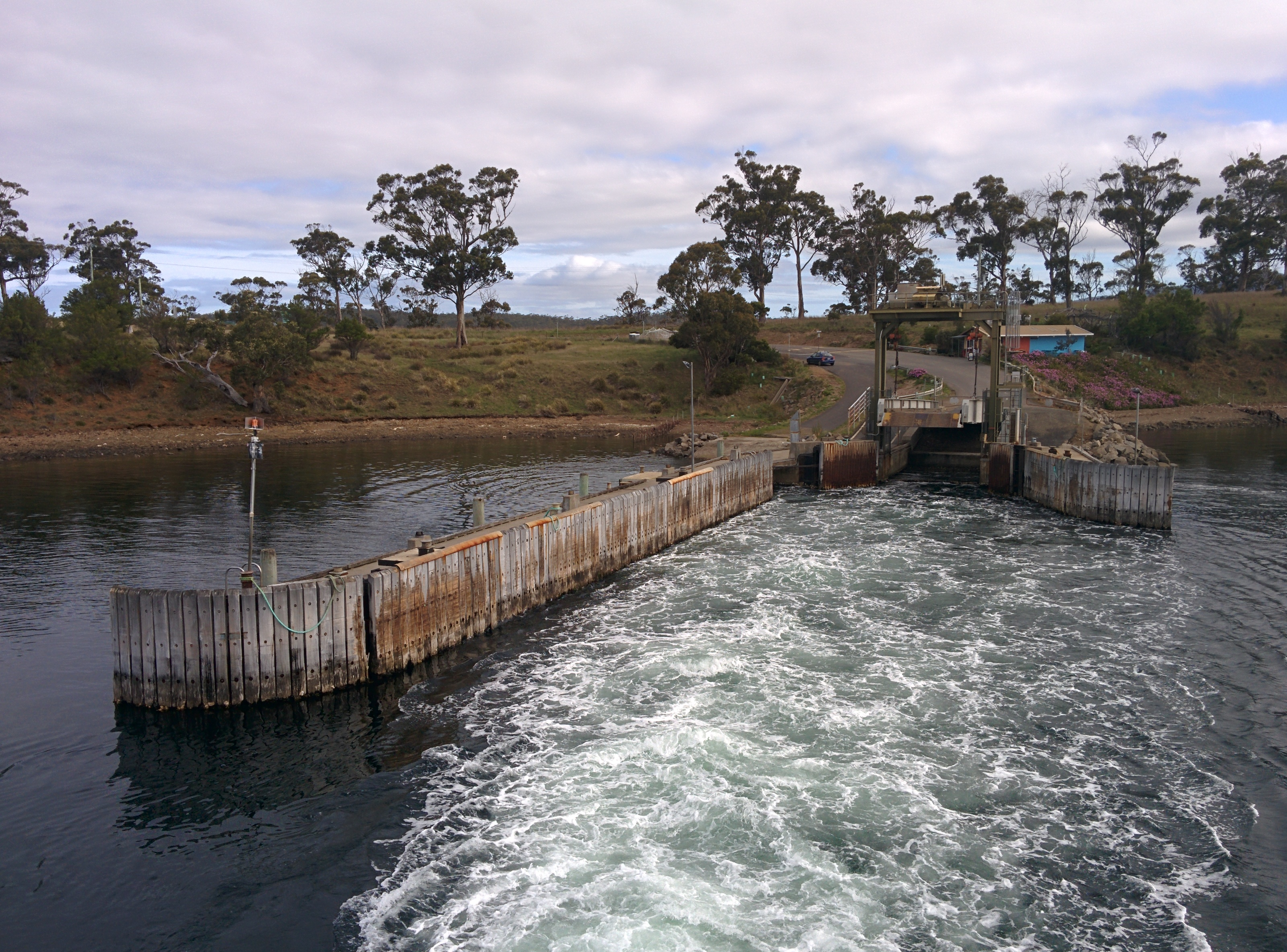
Bruny Island's ferry dock

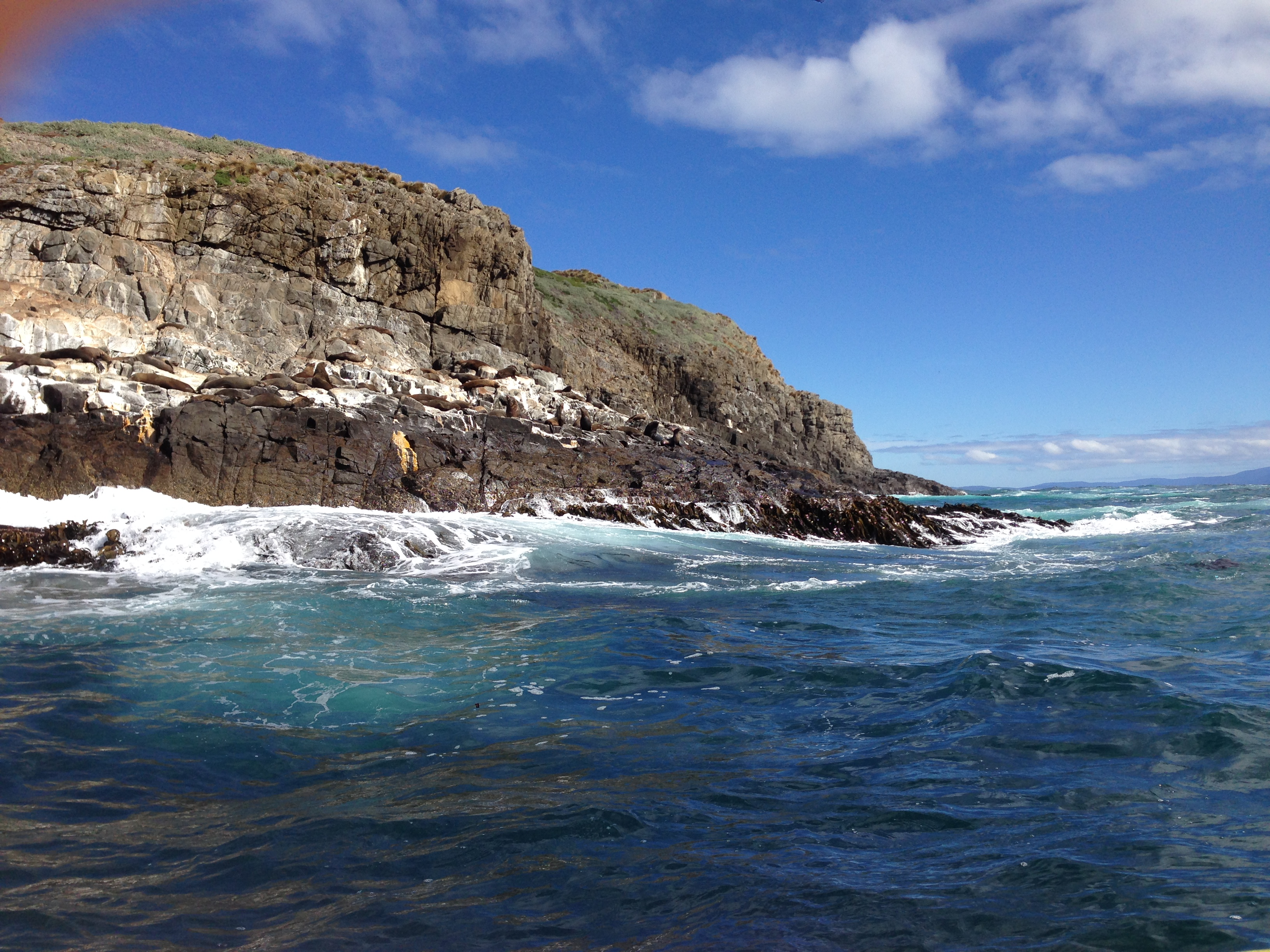
Pennicott, Bruny Island

== See also ==
- List of islands of Tasmania
