= Alonnah, Tasmania =

Alonnah
- Town
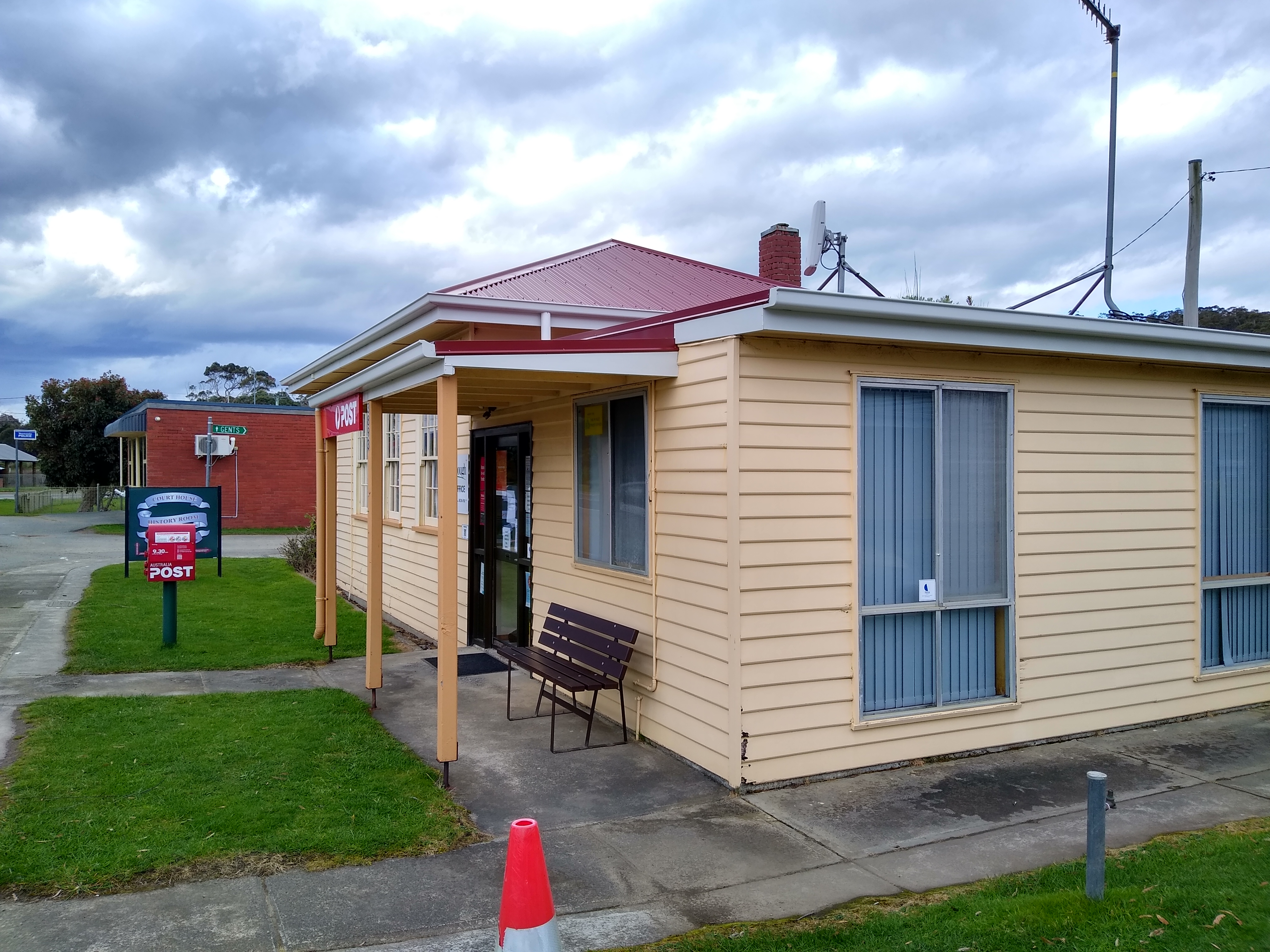
- Alonnah Post Office

- Coordinates: 43°18′54″S 147°14′37″E
- Country: Australia
- State: Tasmania
- Region: Hobart
- LGA: Kingborough
- Location: 60 km (37 mi) S of Kingston

Government
  - State electorate: Franklin
  - Federal division: Franklin

Population
  - Total: 164 (2021 census)
- Postcode: 7150
Localities around Alonnah
D'Entrecasteaux Channel	Simpsons Bay	Simpsons Bay
D'Entrecasteaux Channel	Alonnah	Simpsons Bay, South Bruny
South Bruny	South Bruny	South Bruny

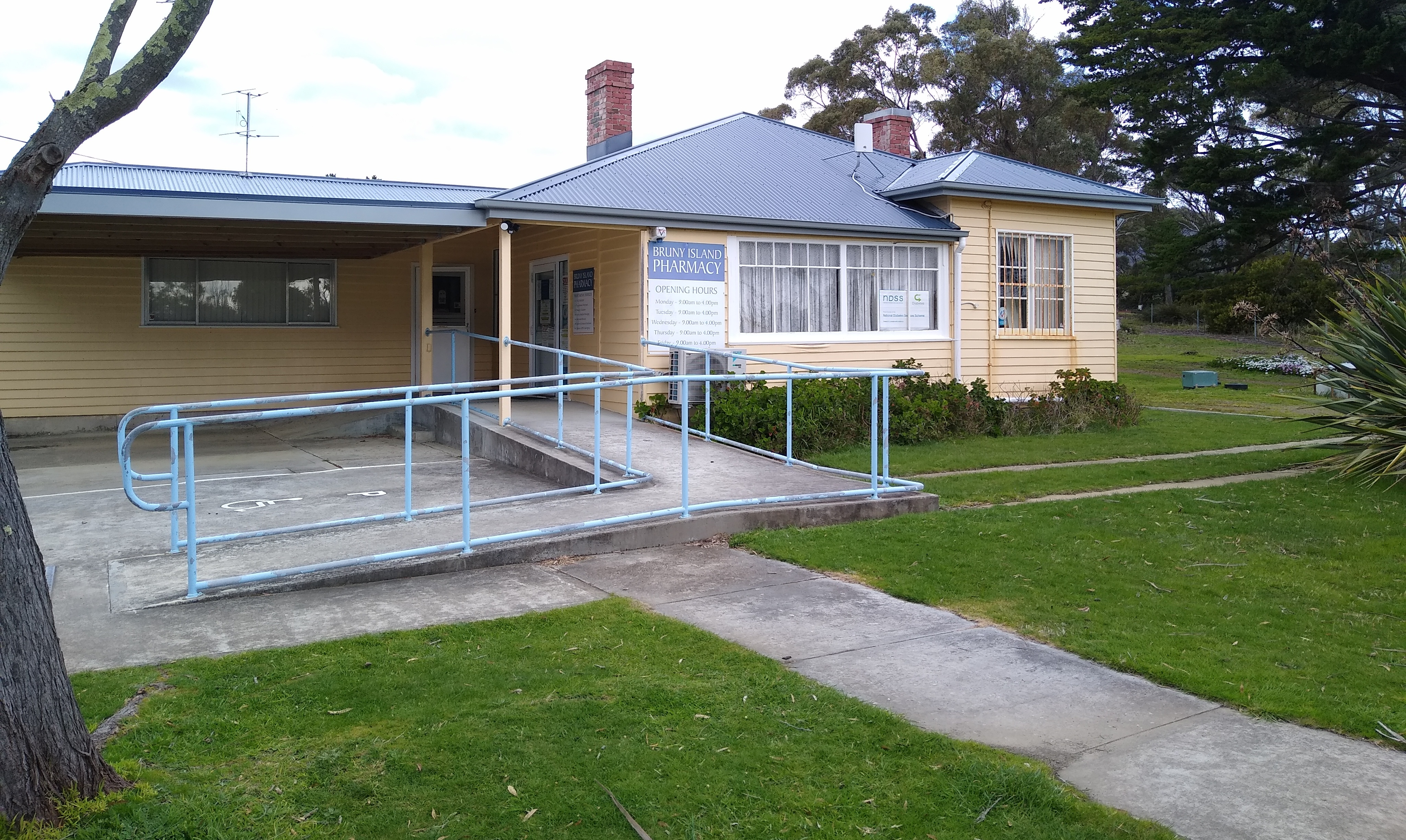
Bruny Island Pharmacy

Alonnah is a rural locality on Bruny Island in the local government area (LGA) of Kingborough in the Hobart LGA region of Tasmania. The locality is about 60 kilometres (37 mi) south (by ferry) of the town of Kingston. The 2021 census recorded a population of 164 for Alonnah.

It is a small township on the western side of Bruny Island, facing the D'Entrecasteaux Channel.

Alonnah is the main location in Bruny Island for government facilities, including post office, police station, primary school, internet centre, community library, pharmacy, and health centre with nurses, a visiting doctor, physiotherapist, and other health practitioners. There is also a museum located in the court house, Bruny Hotel, and a small general store.

The Alonnah Dray track (also known as Sheepwash track) is an easy walking track of historical value, beginning at Alonnah jetty.

== History ==
Alonnah was gazetted as a locality in 1955.

Originally named Mill's Reef, it was renamed in the early 1900s after part of the Tasmanian Aboriginal name for Bruny Island, Lunawanna-alonnah (a nearby township a little to its south being named Lunawanna). Mill's Reef Post Office opened on 1 February 1905 and was renamed Alonnah in 1909.

== Geography ==
The waters of the D'Entrecasteaux Channel form the western boundary.

== Road infrastructure ==
Route B66 (Bruny Island Main Road) runs through from south-west to east.
