= Dainty leek orchid =

Dainty leek orchid is a common name for several plants and may refer to:

- Prasophyllum amoenum, endemic to Tasmania
- Prasophyllum plumiforme, endemic to Western Australia
