= Electrona, Tasmania =

Electrona Tasmania
- Coordinates: 43°03′09″S 147°15′29″E
- Population: 601 (2021 census)
- Postcode(s): 7054
- Location: 12 km (7 mi) S of Kingston
- LGA(s): Kingborough
- Region: Hobart
- State electorate(s): Franklin, Clark
- Federal division(s): Franklin, Clark
Localities around Electrona:
Margate	Margate, Barretta	North-West Bay
Margate	Electrona	North-West Bay
Margate, Snug	Snug	North-West Bay

Electrona is a semi-rural township and former industrial site in the southern region of Tasmania, Australia. Situated on the western shore of the D'Entrecasteaux Channel, it lies within the Kingborough Council local government area, approximately 12 km (7.5 mi) south of Kingston and 35 km (22 mi) south of central Hobart. At the 2021 census, Electrona had a population of 601 people.

The township is notable as the first site in Tasmania to industrialise using hydroelectric power, with the establishment of the Electrona Carbide Works in 1917. This factory, powered by the Great Lake hydro scheme initiated by industrialist James Hynds Gillies, marked the beginning of the state’s transformation into a hydro-powered economy. Electrona grew as a company town centred around carbide and later silicon production, employing hundreds at its peak.

Since the closure of these operations in the early 1990s, Electrona has evolved into a quiet residential community with light industrial activity, forming part of the Greater Hobart metropolitan area. The locality is known for its views across North-West Bay, proximity to popular Channel towns such as Snug and Margate, and its historical significance as one of Tasmania’s earliest electrolytic industrial sites.

== History ==
The name Electrona is believed to derive from the early use of electricity in carbide smelting at the site. The locality was officially gazetted in 1965.

Industrialist James Hynds Gillies began negotiations with the Tasmanian Government in 1908 to construct a hydroelectric scheme at Great Lake. The scheme was intended to power a zinc smelter and a calcium carbide factory. The carbide plant was constructed at Peggy's Beach, near Snug, and commenced operation in 1917. Using lime, coke and electric arc furnaces, the plant produced carbide for the generation of acetylene gas used in welding and lighting.

Gillies’ company went into receivership in 1924, and the Hydro Electric Department (later the Hydro-Electric Commission and now Hydro Tasmania) assumed control of the electricity assets. The zinc smelting project was later revived by separate interests and today operates at the Nyrstar Hobart Smelter in Lutana, Tasmania.

The carbide facility was taken over by Electrona Carbide Industries Pty Ltd and continued operating until the early 1980s. At its peak in the 1960s, the Electrona Carbide Works employed more than 250 people. It suffered major damage in the 1967 Tasmanian fires and, following significant losses from plant failures in 1979, was sold to Pioneer Silicon Industries Pty Ltd.

In 1988, the plant was refitted to produce metallurgical-grade silicon with an intended capacity of 10,000 tonnes per year. However, the new operation was never profitable and closed permanently in August 1991.

A permanent display on the history of the Electrona Carbide Works, including historical photographs, documents and industrial artefacts, is located at the Channel Museum in nearby Margate.

== Post-industrial transition ==
Following the closure of the silicon plant in the early 1990s, the Electrona site underwent significant redevelopment. Many of the larger smelter buildings were demolished, though remnants such as concrete foundations, utility structures, and access roads remain visible. The area transitioned toward residential use, with expansion of the Peggy’s Beach housing area, and the establishment of small-scale businesses in the adjacent light industrial zone.

Today, Electrona is primarily a residential locality with some light industrial activity. It serves as a commuter suburb for residents working in Kingston and Hobart.

== Geography ==
Electrona is located on the western shore of North-West Bay, which forms its eastern boundary. It is bordered by Margate to the north and Snug to the south.

== Access ==
The locality is traversed by Route B68 (Channel Highway), which provides access to nearby towns and the Hobart metropolitan area.

== Sources ==
- Crowley, Catherine (1989). "Accommodating industry in Tasmania: Eco-political factors behind the Electrona Silicon Smelter dispute". University of Tasmania – via Trove.
- Stephens, J. R. (1985). Environmental impact statement relating to a proposed silicon producing plant to be located at Electrona, Tasmania (Report). Environmental and Technical Services Pty Ltd for Tasmanian Silicon Smelters Pty Ltd – via Trove.
- Guthrie, V. A.; Chesterman, R. B. (1992). Report on monitoring of the Pioneer Silicon Industries Silicon Smelter, Electrona, Tasmania (Report). Tasmania. Department of Environment and Planning – via Trove.
- "Tasmania: The Birmingham of the Commonwealth". Building: The Magazine for the Architect, Builder, Property Owner and Merchant. 26 (155). Sydney: Building Publishing Co. 12 July 1920 – via Trove.
- "Electrona: Industrial Town". The Real Property Annual (7). Melbourne: Herald and Weekly Times. August 1918 – via Trove.
