= Birchs Bay, Tasmania =

Birchs Bay
- Town
- Coordinates: 43°11′00″S 147°13′12″E
- Country: Australia
- State: Tasmania
- Region: Hobart
- LGA: Kingborough
- Location: 30 km (19 mi) S of Kingston

Government
  - State electorate: Franklin, Clark
  - Federal division: Franklin, Clark

Population
  - Total: 93 (2016 census)
- Postcode: 7162
Localities around Birchs Bay
Woodbridge	Woodbridge	Woodbridge
Garden Island Creek	Birchs Bay	D'Entrecasteaux Channel
Garden Island Creek	Flowerpot	Flowerpot

Birchs Bay is a rural residential locality in the local government area (LGA) of Kingborough in the Hobart LGA region of Tasmania. The locality is about 30 kilometres (19 mi) south of the town of Kingston. The 2016 census recorded a population of 93 for the state suburb of Birchs Bay.

== History ==
Birchs Bay was gazetted as a locality in 1968.

== Geography ==
The waters of the D'Entrecasteaux Channel form most of the eastern boundary.

== Road infrastructure ==
Route B68 (Channel Highway) runs through from north-east to south-east.
