= Snug, Tasmania =

Snug
- Town
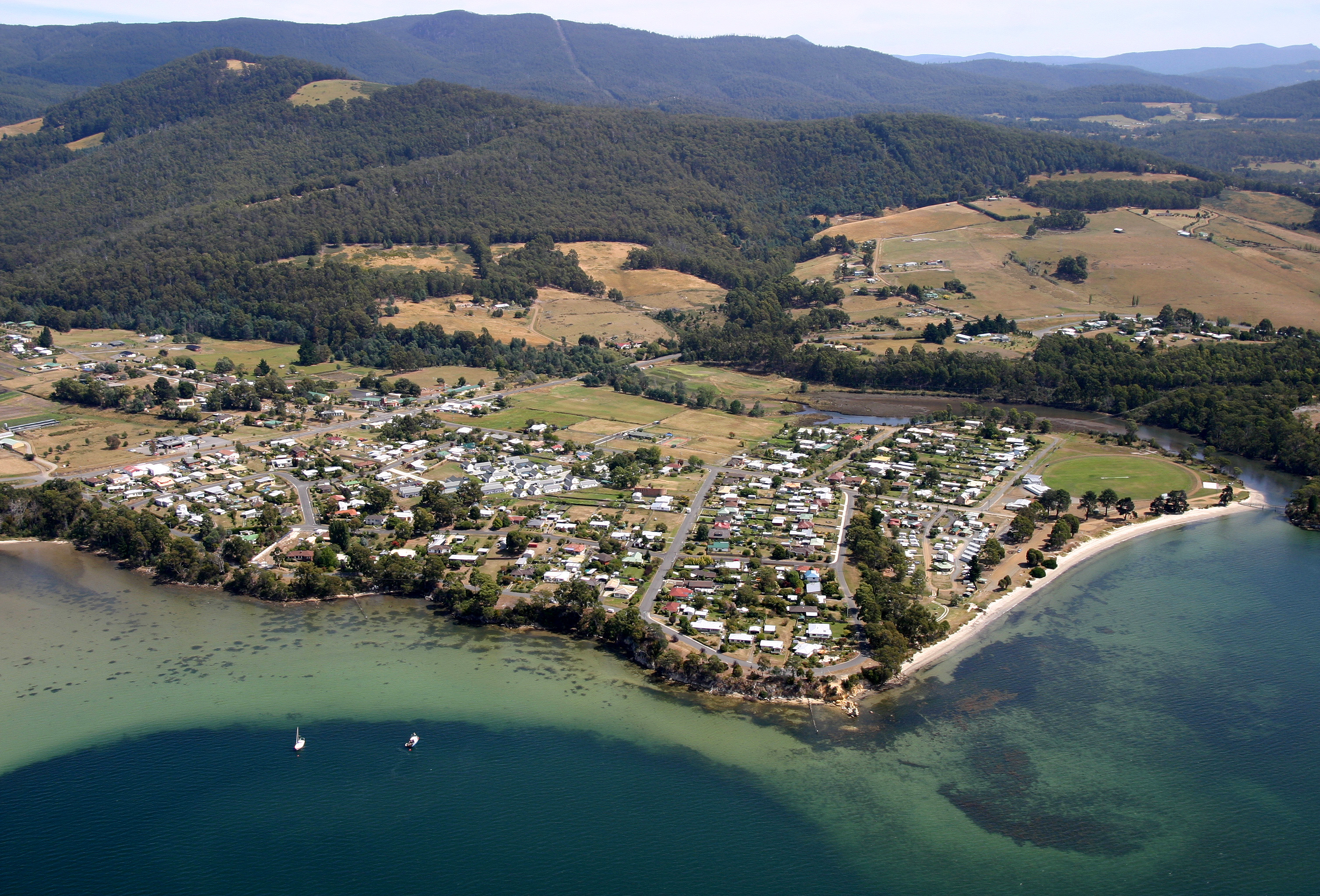
- Snug aerial, c. 2006

- Coordinates: 43°04′0″S 147°16′0″E
- Country: Australia
- State: Tasmania
- LGA: Kingborough, Huon Valley
- Location: 30 km (19 mi) S of Hobart; 13 km (8.1 mi) S of Kingston; 32 km (20 mi) NE of Cygnet
- Established: 1840s

Government
  - State electorate: Franklin
  - Federal division: Franklin

Population
  - Total: 1,440 (2021 census)
- Postcode: 7054
- Gazetted: 1965

Snug is a small coastal town on the Channel Highway, located 30 km (19 mi) south of Hobart in Tasmania, Australia. It lies on the shore of the D'Entrecasteaux Channel, with views across the water to Bruny Island. At the 2021 census, Snug had a population of 1,440. The town is within the Kingborough Council area, though a small portion lies in the Huon Valley Council, and it is considered part of Greater Hobart.

Primarily a residential community for those working in Hobart and Kingborough, Snug also supports a modest tourism sector. Local amenities include a primary school, general store, supermarket, butcher, pub, community hall, churches, sports oval, caravan park, nursery, retirement home, and a playground. A monthly community market is held in the town.

== History ==
=== Palawa history ===
The Snug area lies within the traditional lands of the Nuenonne of Bruny Island, who maintained strong kinship and language ties with the neighbouring Muwinina (Hobart area) and Mellukerdee (Huon Valley) bands. These South-East groups shared seasonal access to the D'Entrecasteaux Channel region, gathering for resources, trade, and ceremony under customary protocols of reciprocal custodianship.

=== European exploration and settlement ===
The Snug area was first recorded by Europeans when French Vice-Admiral Bruni d'Entrecasteaux sailed through the D'Entrecasteaux Channel in 1792. Following the establishment of the British colony at Hobart Town, the nearby Snug River was named for the sheltered nature of its river inlet and coastline. By the 1820s, a port and timber mills had been established at nearby North-West Bay. Originally known as "The Snug", the small settlement began to take form by the 1840s and 1850s.

Snug River Post Office opened on 1 October 1870 and was renamed Snug in 1908.

The town established the Snug Soldiers' Memorial Avenue, in 1953 to commemorate local service members who served in World War II. The township of Snug was gazetted on 11 August 1965.

Today, Snug encompasses the smaller locality of Lower Snug, located to the south of the main township. Lower Snug is a rural residential area that was gazetted as a locality in 1972.

=== Carbide factory ===
In 1917, industrialist James Hynds Gillies commenced construction of a carbide factory at Electrona, a locality situated just north of Snug. Gillies intended to use electricity from a proposed hydroelectric scheme at Great Lake to produce calcium carbide for acetylene gas. The Electrona Carbide Works began production shortly after World War I. Although Gillies lost control of the hydroelectric project (later developed into what became Hydro Tasmania) the carbide works continued under various operators.

As demand for carbide declined, the factory was sold to Pioneer Silicon Industries and converted into a silicon smelter in 1988, producing metallurgical-grade silicon. However, the plant struggled financially and closed permanently in 1991.

=== 1967 bushfires ===
On 7 February 1967, Snug was among the worst-affected areas during the catastrophic bushfires that swept southern Tasmania, an event known as the 1967 Tasmanian bushfires or 'Black Tuesday'. The fires resulted in the deaths of 62 people across the region, with over 900 injured and 7,000 left homeless. In Snug, 11 residents lost their lives, and approximately 80 of the town's 120 buildings were destroyed, including homes, churches, and half the local school.

To commemorate those who perished and to acknowledge the community's loss and resilience, the Snug Bushfire Memorial was erected in 2007. The memorial symbolically represents the widespread devastation of the fires and consists of a stylised steel skeleton of a house painted in raw orange to evoke flame and heat. A standing brick chimney reflects the common image of chimneys being the only structures left standing after a fire. It serves as a focal point for remembrance of all those affected across southern Tasmania.

=== St John's Church ===
The current St John's Church in Snug was constructed in 1969 to replace a 1920s Anglican church destroyed in the 1967 bushfires. Designed by architect Harry Oldmeadow, the new brick building was completed at a cost of $28,000 and was consecrated in April of the same year. A cross made from charred timber recovered from the original church was installed in the new building as a memorial feature.

The church has since been deconsecrated and is currently leased to the Snug Christian Church. As of 2023, the Anglican Diocese entered into an agreement to sell the property to the adjacent aged care facility, Christian Homes.

== Environment ==
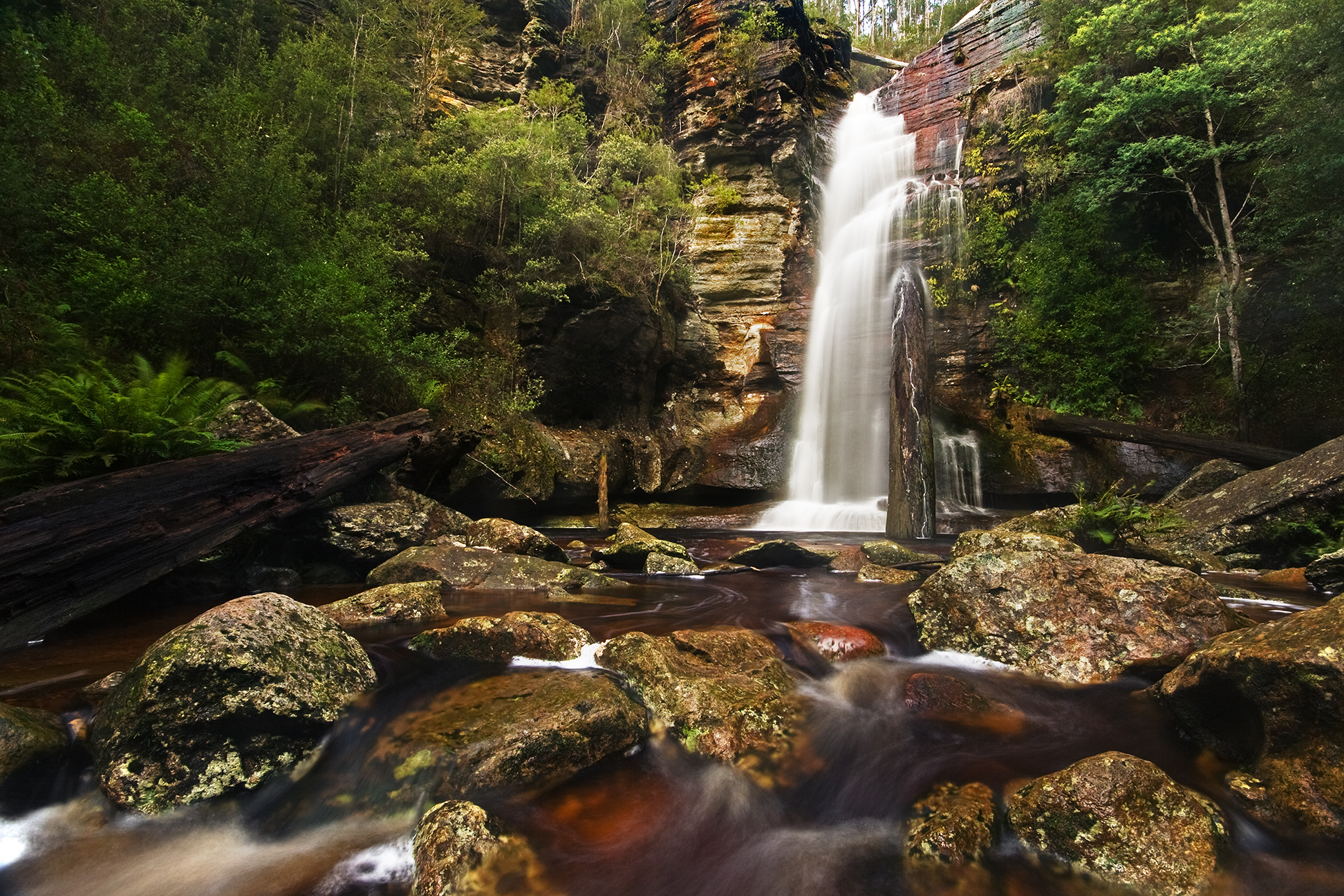
Snug Falls in 2009

Snug Falls, a popular local walking destination, is located in the nearby bushland. The walking track to the falls begins from a car park off Snug Falls Road and is approximately 2 km (1.2 mi) return. The trail descends through open eucalypt forest with views over the Snug Tiers Nature Recreation Area (established in 1927), ending at a cascade where the Snug River drops over mossy rock ledges into a fern-lined gully. It is considered a relatively easy walk and is especially popular after rain when the waterfall is flowing at its strongest.

Other natural features in the region include the Snug Tiers, a range of forested hills that offer views over North-West Bay and the D'Entrecasteaux Channel. The area is known for native flora and fauna, including Tasmanian blue gums and echidnas. Snug Beach, located at the mouth of the Snug River, provides sheltered swimming conditions and is a common spot for families, picnics, and kayaking. It is backed by grassy foreshore reserves and is accessible from the town centre.

== Sport ==
The town supported a football team in the Kingborough Football Association, winning premierships in 1954, 1956 and 1957. The team later merged with neighbouring clubs to form the Channel Football Club.

== Gallery ==
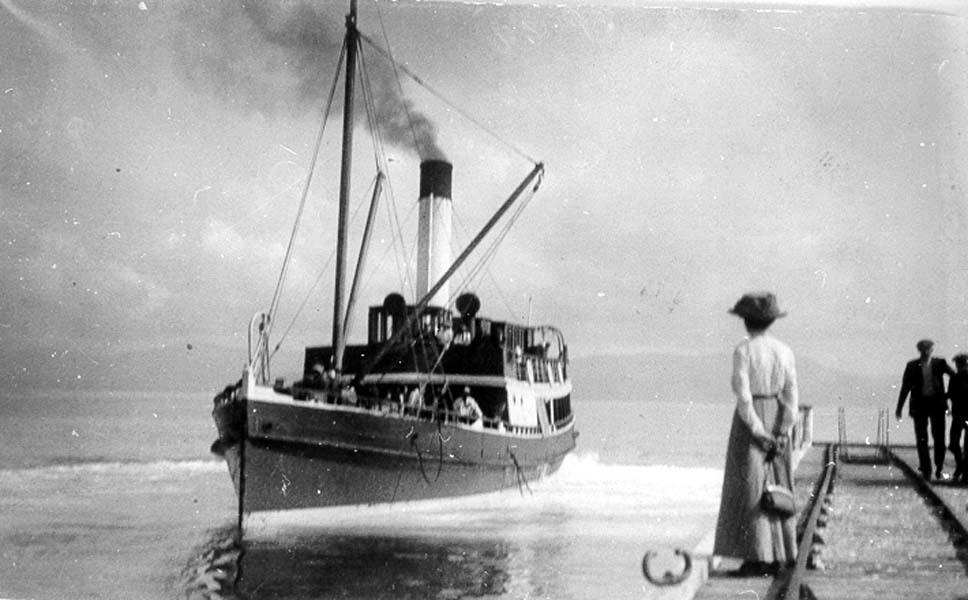
Steamship arriving at the Snug jetty, c. 1910s. From the Crowther Collection, Libraries Tasmania.

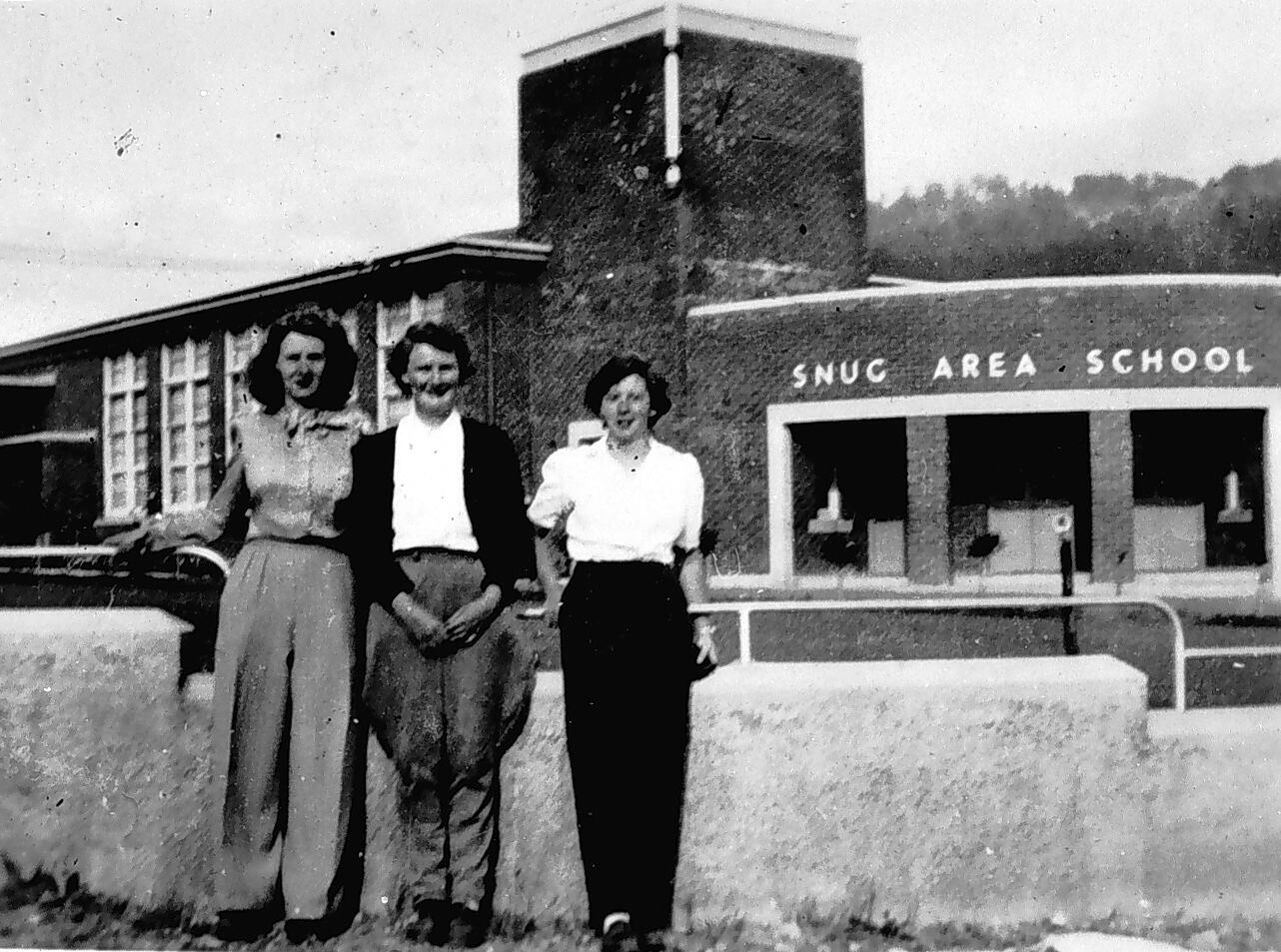
Three women outside Snug Area School, c. 1955. From the collection of Betty McDowell (née Thwaites), Museums Victoria.

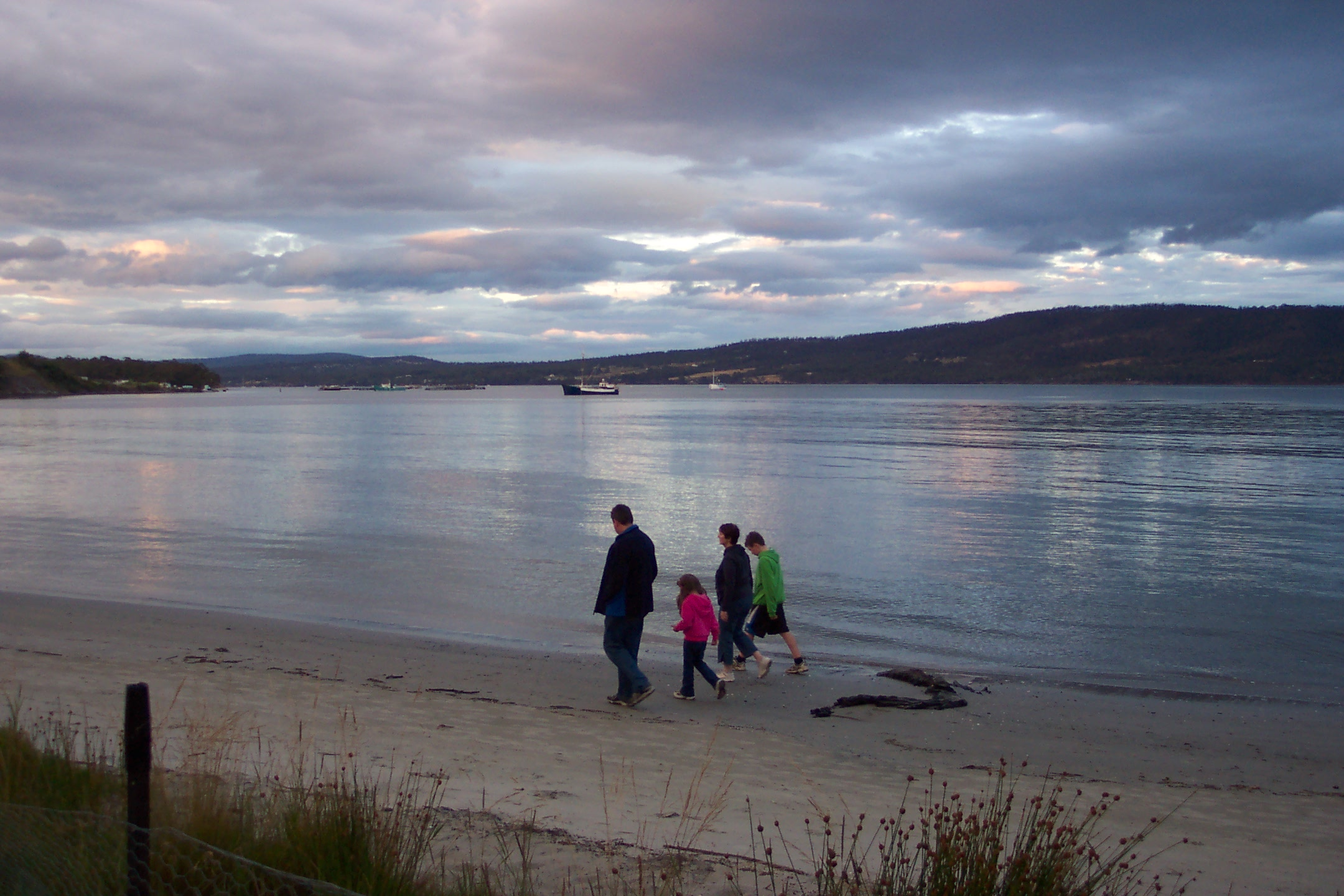
Snug Beach at dusk, c. 2005.

== Notable people ==
- Beau Webster – professional cricketer who has represented the Hobart Hurricanes, and other domestic teams, Tasmania and the Australian Men’s Cricket Team; born and raised in Snug.
- James Hynds Gillies – entrepreneur and industrialist who established the Electrona Carbide Works at nearby Electrona.
- Russell Menzies – musician.

== Access ==
The Channel Highway (Route B68) passes through both Snug and Lower Snug, linking the locality to Kingston and Hobart. Public transport is provided by Metro Tasmania, with routes 413, 415, 416, 417 and 422 operating between Hobart and Snug, offering regular weekday and limited weekend services.

Historically, Snug also served as a terminal for ferry access to Bruny Island. In 1938, Grant’s Bruny Island Ferry Service commenced operations with the MV Taruna, initially running between Middleton and Simpsons Bay. By 1943, a second vessel, the Gayclitte, captained by J. F. Miley, operated from the Snug Jetty to Dennes Point. However, due to deterioration of the jetty, the service was later relocated to Tinderbox, from where it continued to service Dennes Point.

== See also ==
- List of localities in Tasmania

== Sources ==
- Gardam, Julie (2007), The Snug : A History of the Snug-Electrona-Coningham Area, J. Gardam
