= Coningham, Tasmania =

Coningham
- Town
- Coordinates: 43°05′00″S 147°16′50″E
- Country: Australia
- State: Tasmania
- Region: Hobart
- LGA: Kingborough
- Location: 17 km (11 mi) S of Kingston

Government
  - State electorate: Franklin, Clark
  - Federal division: Franklin, Clark

Population
  - Total: 253 (2016 census)
- Postcode: 7054
Localities around Coningham
North-West Bay	North-West Bay	D'Entrecasteaux Channel
Lower Snug	Coningham	D'Entrecasteaux Channel
Lower Snug	Oyster Cove	D'Entrecasteaux Channel

Coningham is a rural residential locality in the local government area (LGA) of Kingborough in the Hobart LGA region of Tasmania. The locality is about 17 kilometres (11 mi) south of the town of Kingston. The 2016 census recorded a population of 253 for the state suburb of Coningham. Coningham is part of the Greater Hobart statistical area.

== History ==
Coningham was gazetted as a locality in 1965.

== Geography ==
The waters of North-West Bay form the northern boundary, and D'Entrecasteaux Channel the eastern.

== Road infrastructure ==
Route B68 (Channel Highway) passes to the west. Old Station Road and Coningham Road provide access to the locality.
