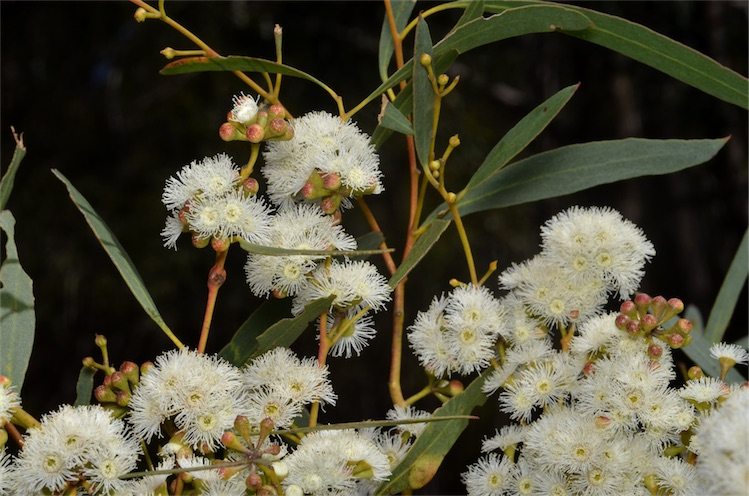
- Eucalyptus amygdalina near Electrona

Conservation status
- Near Threatened (IUCN 3.1)

Scientific classification
- Kingdom: Plantae
- Clade: Tracheophytes
- Clade: Angiosperms
- Clade: Eudicots
- Clade: Rosids
- Order: Myrtales
- Family: Myrtaceae
- Genus: Eucalyptus
- Species: E. amygdalina

Binomial name
- Eucalyptus amygdalina Labill.

Synonyms
- Eucalyptus amygdalina Labill. var. amygdalina; Eucalyptus glandulosa Desf.; Eucalyptus globularis DC. nom. inval., pro syn.; Eucalyptus salicifolia Cav.; Eucalyptus salicifolia Cav. var. salicifolia; Eucalyptus salicifolius Cav. orth. var.

= Eucalyptus amygdalina =

Black peppermint

Species of eucalyptus

Eucalyptus amygdalina, commonly known as black peppermint, is a species of flowering plant that is endemic to Tasmania. It is a small to medium-sized tree with rough bark on park of the trunk, smooth grey to brown bark above, lance-shaped to linear adult leaves, oval to club-shaped flower buds, white flowers and cup-shaped to hemispherical fruit.

== Description ==
Eucalyptus amygdalina is a tree that typically grows to a height of 30 m (98 ft) and forms a lignotuber. It has rough, finely fibrous bark on most or all of the trunk and base of the larger branches, smooth greyish bark above. The leaves on young plants and on coppice regrowth are arranged in opposite pairs, lance-shaped or curved, 28–55 mm (1.1–2.2 in) long, 2–11 mm (0.079–0.433 in) wide and sessile. Adult leaves are arranged alternately along the stems, the same shade of bluish green on both sides, lance-shaped to linear, 55–120 mm (2.2–4.7 in) long and 4–12 mm (0.16–0.47 in) wide on a petiole 4–20 mm (0.16–0.79 in) long. The flowers are borne in groups of eleven to fifteen or more in leaf axils on a peduncle 4–10 mm (0.16–0.39 in) long, the individual flowers on a pedicel 1–5 mm (0.039–0.20 in) long. The buds are oval to club-shaped, 3–5 mm (0.12–0.20 in) long, 2–3 mm (0.079–0.118 in) wide and the stamens are white. Flowering mainly occurs from November to January and the fruit are cup-shaped to hemispherical, 4–7 mm (0.16–0.28 in) long and wide.

== Taxonomy ==
Eucalyptus amygdalina was first formally described in 1806 by Jacques Labillardière in his book Novae Hollandiae Plantarum Specimen. The specific epithet (amygdalina) means "almond".

== Distribution ==
Black peppermint is endemic to Tasmania where it is widespread in the drier, north-eastern side of the island, from coastal areas extending well inland to the edges of plateaux where it is part of dry eucalypt forest communities.

== See also ==
- List of Eucalyptus species
