= Flowerpot, Tasmania =

Flowerpot
- Town
- Coordinates: 43°12′11″S 147°14′32″E
- Country: Australia
- State: Tasmania
- Region: Hobart
- LGA: Kingborough
- Location: 31 km (19 mi) S of Kingston

Government
  - State electorate: Franklin, Clark
  - Federal division: Franklin, Clark

Population
  - Total: 73 (2016 census)
- Postcode: 7163
Localities around Flowerpot
Birchs Bay	Birchs Bay	Birchs Bay
Garden Island Creek	Flowerpot	D'Entrecasteaux Channel
Garden Island Creek	Middleton	Middleton

Flowerpot is a rural locality in the local government area (LGA) of Kingborough in the Hobart LGA region of Tasmania. The locality is about 31 kilometres (19 mi) south of the town of Kingston. The 2016 census recorded a population of 73 for the state suburb of Flowerpot.

== History ==
Flowerpot was gazetted as a locality in 1968.

== Geography ==
The waters of the D'Entrecasteaux Channel form the eastern boundary.

== Road infrastructure ==
Route B68 (Channel Highway) runs through from north-east to south-east.
