= Charlotte Cove =

- Town
- Coordinates: 43°16′06″S 147°08′54″E
- Country: Australia
- State: Tasmania
- Region: South-east
- LGA: Huon Valley
- Location: 35 km (22 mi) S of Huonville

Government
  - State electorate: Franklin
  - Federal division: Franklin

Population
  - Total: 34 (2016 census)
- Postcode: 7112
Localities around Charlotte Cove
Garden Island Creek	Garden Island Creek	Garden Island Creek
Huon River	Charlotte Cove	Verona Sands
Huon River	Huon River	Verona Sands

Charlotte Cove is a rural locality in the local government area (LGA) of Huon Valley in the South-east LGA region of Tasmania. The locality is about 35 kilometres (22 mi) south of the town of Huonville. The 2016 census recorded a population of 34 for the state suburb of Charlotte Cove.

== History ==
Charlotte Cove is a confirmed locality.

== Geography ==
The western and southern boundaries follow the shoreline of the Huon River estuary.

== Road infrastructure ==
Route B68 (Channel Highway) runs through from north-west to south-east.
