= Gordon, Tasmania =

Gordon
- Town
- Coordinates: 43°15′54″S 147°12′35″E
- Country: Australia
- State: Tasmania
- Region: Hobart, South-east
- LGA: Kingborough, Huon Valley
- Location: 43 km (27 mi) SW of Kingston

Government
  - State electorate: Franklin
  - Federal division: Franklin

Population
  - Total: 199 (2016 census)
- Postcode: 7150
Localities around Gordon
Garden Island Creek	Middleton	D'Entrecasteaux Channel
Verona Sands, Garden Island Creek	Gordon	D'Entrecasteaux Channel
D'Entrecasteaux Channel	D'Entrecasteaux Channel	D'Entrecasteaux Channel

Gordon is a rural locality in the local government areas of Kingborough and Huon Valley in the Hobart and South-east regions of Tasmania. The locality is about 43 kilometres (27 mi) south-west of the town of Kingston. The 2016 census recorded a population of 199 for the state suburb of Gordon.

== History ==
Gordon was gazetted as a locality in 1967. It is believed that the locality was named for General Charles George Gordon.

== Geography ==
The D'Entrecasteaux Channel forms the southern and eastern boundaries.

== Road infrastructure ==
The B68 route (Channel Highway) enters from the south-west and follows the coast to the north-east, where it exits.
