= Verona Sands, Tasmania =

Verona Sands
- Town
- Coordinates: 43°16′19″S 147°09′42″E
- Country: Australia
- State: Tasmania
- Region: South-east
- LGA: Huon Valley
- Location: 37 km (23 mi) SE of Huonville

Government
  - State electorate: Franklin
  - Federal division: Franklin

Population
  - Total: 131 (SAL 2021)
- Postcode: 7112
Localities around Verona Sands
Garden Island Creek	Garden Island Creek	Gordon
Charlotte Cove	Verona Sands	Gordon
Charlotte Cove	Huon River	Gordon

Verona Sands is a rural locality in the local government area (LGA) of Huon Valley in the South-east LGA region of Tasmania. The locality is about 37 kilometres (23 mi) south-east of the town of Huonville.

== History ==
Verona Sands was gazetted as a locality in 1968.

The 2016 census recorded a population of 78 for the state suburb of Verona Sands. At the 2021 census, the population had increased to 131.

== Geography ==
The waters of the Huon River estuary form the southern boundary.

== Road infrastructure ==
Route B68 (Channel Highway) runs through from south-west to south-east.
