= Barretta, Tasmania =

Barretta Tasmania
- Coordinates: 43°02′46″S 147°15′43″E
- Population: 41 (2016 census)
- Postcode(s): 7054
- Location: 13 km (8 mi) SW of Kingston
- LGA(s): Kingborough
- Region: Hobart
- State electorate(s): Franklin, Clark
- Federal division(s): Franklin, Clark
Localities around Barretta:
Margate	Margate	Margate
Margate	Barretta	North-West Bay
Electrona	Electrona	Electrona

Barretta is a rural locality in the local government area (LGA) of Kingborough in the Hobart LGA region of Tasmania. The locality is about 13 kilometres (8.1 mi) south-west of the town of Kingston. The 2016 census recorded a population of 41 for the state suburb of Barretta. Barretta is part of the Greater Hobart statistical area.

== History ==
Barretta was gazetted as a locality in 1965. It is believed that the name was derived from an early settler family named Barrett.

== Geography ==
The waters of North-West Bay form most of the eastern boundary.

== Road infrastructure ==
Route B68 (Channel Highway) runs through from north to south.
