= Lower Snug =

- Town
- Coordinates: 43°04′57″S 147°14′50″E
- Country: Australia
- State: Tasmania
- Region: Hobart
- LGA: Kingborough
- Location: 15 km (9.3 mi) S of Kingston

Government
  - State electorate: Franklin, Clark
  - Federal division: Franklin, Clark

Population
  - Total: 442 (2016 census)
- Postcode: 7054
Localities around Lower Snug
Snug	North-West Bay	Coningham
Snug	Lower Snug	Coningham
Oyster Cove	Oyster Cove	Oyster Cove

Lower Snug is a rural residential locality in the local government area (LGA) of Kingborough in the Hobart LGA region of Tasmania. The locality is about 15 kilometres (9.3 mi) south of the town of Kingston. The 2016 census recorded a population of 442 for the state suburb of Lower Snug. Lower Snug is also part of the Greater Hobart statistical area.

== History ==
Lower Snug was gazetted as a locality in 1972.

== Geography ==
The waters of North-West Bay form part of the northern boundary.

== Road infrastructure ==
Route B68 (Channel Highway) runs through from north to south.
