= Prasophyllum plumiforme =

Dainty leek orchid

Scientific classification
- Kingdom: Plantae
- Clade: Tracheophytes
- Clade: Angiosperms
- Clade: Monocots
- Order: Asparagales
- Family: Orchidaceae
- Subfamily: Orchidoideae
- Tribe: Diurideae
- Subtribe: Prasophyllinae
- Genus: Prasophyllum
- Species: P. plumiforme

Binomial name
- Prasophyllum plumiforme Fitzg.

Species of orchid

Prasophyllum plumiforme, commonly known as the dainty leek orchid, is a species of orchid endemic to the south-west of Western Australia. It is a small leek orchid with a single smooth, tubular leaf and up to fifty or more tiny cream-coloured or greenish-yellow flowers on a tall flowering stem.

== Description ==
Prasophyllum plumiforme is a terrestrial, perennial, deciduous, herb with an underground tuber and a single smooth, tube-shaped leaf which is 200–350 mm (8–10 in) long and 2–3 mm (0.08–0.1 in) in diameter. Between fifteen and fifty or more flowers are moderately crowded on a flowering stem 80–150 mm (3–6 in) long reaching to a height of 300–600 mm (10–20 in). The flowers are cream-coloured to greenish-yellow, about 4 mm (0.2 in) long and wide. As with others in the genus, the flowers are inverted so that the labellum is above the column rather than below it. The dorsal sepal is 4–5 mm (0.16–0.20 in) long and about 2 mm (0.08 in) wide and the lateral sepals are 4–5 mm (0.16–0.20 in) long and about 1 mm (0.04 in) wide and free from each other. The petals are about the same size as the lateral sepals and turn forwards. The labellum is about 4 mm (0.2 in) long, 3.5 mm (0.1 in) wide and turns obliquely upwards near its middle. The edges of the labellum are crinkled and there is a green callus along its centre. Flowering occurs from September to November. This leek orchid resembles P. ovale but is taller and has smaller, less crowded flowers.

== Taxonomy and naming ==
Prasophyllum plumiforme was first formally described in 1882 by Robert FitzGerald and the description was published in The Gardeners' Chronicle. The specific epithet (plumiforme) is derived from the Latin word pluma meaning "soft feather" or "down" with the suffix -forme meaning "shape", referring to the feather-like labellum.

== Distribution and habitat ==
The dainty leek orchid is widespread and often common in woodland and shrubland between Kalbarri and Israelite Bay.

== Conservation ==
Prasophyllum plumiforme is classified as "not threatened" by the Western Australian Government Department of Parks and Wildlife.
