= Bruny Island Ferry =

Ferry route from Kettering to Bruny Island in Tasmania, Australia

The Bruny Island Ferry links Bruny Island to the Tasmanian mainland. Once operated by the North Western Shipping and Towage Company and owned by the Government of Tasmania, the ferry Mirambeena travels between Kettering on the Tasmanian mainland and Roberts Point on Bruny Island, the service is now run by Kelsian.

== History ==
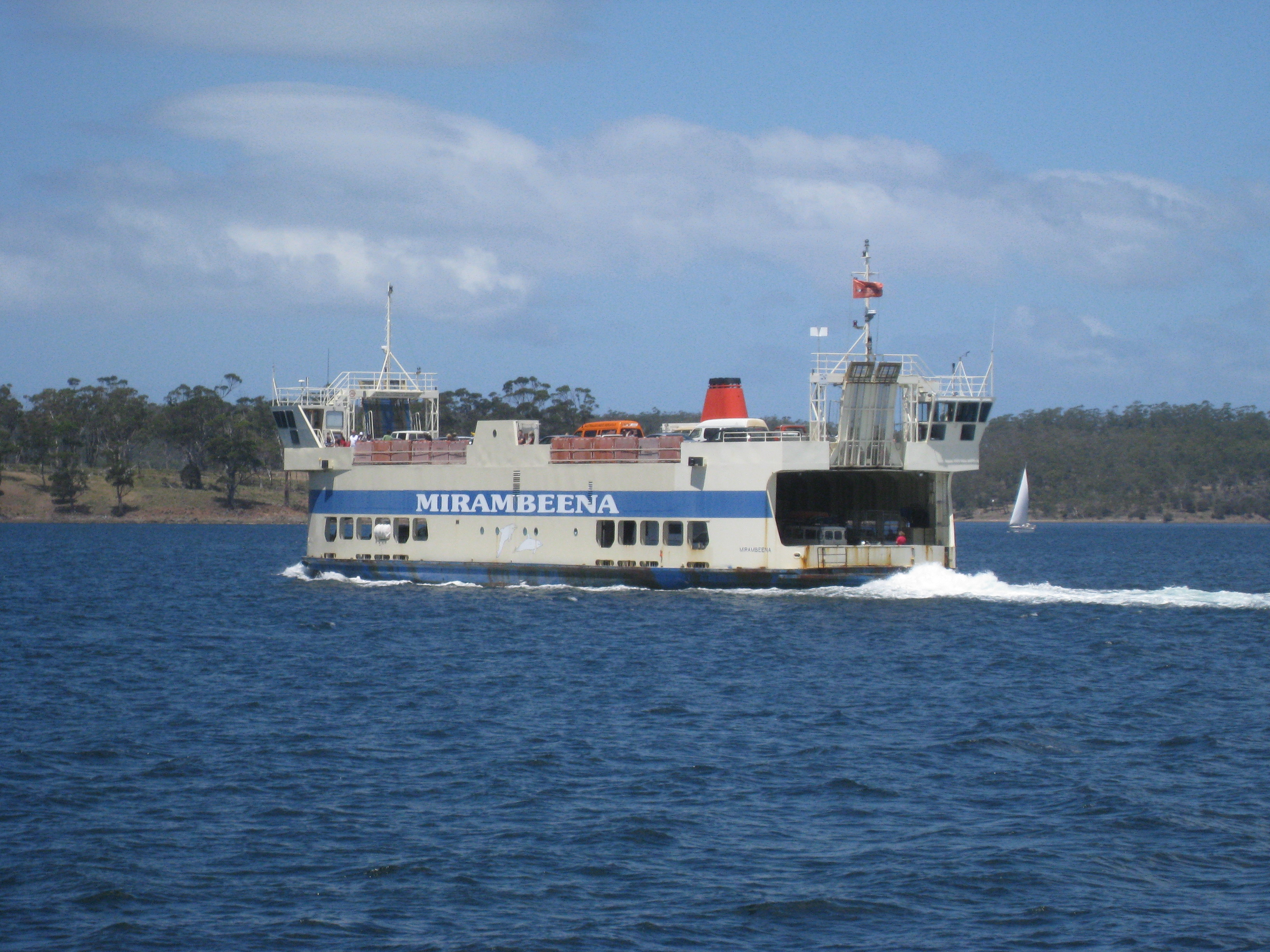
The Bruny Island ferry Mirambeena en route from Kettering to Roberts Point

Name	Year built	Builder	Initial Ownership	Current Ownership / Fate	Max. Passengers
SS Lottah	1901	Wilson, John		Unknown	
SS Ronnie	1903			Unknown	
SS Dover				Unknown	
ML Taruna	c.1910	McKay, Charles Harold		Unknown	
ML Gayclite	c.1943			Unknown	
SS Breone	c.1910	Moore, Frederick		Unknown	
SS Excella	1912	Mr John Dalgleish	James Rowe & Sons	Unknown	
SS Beagle				Unknown	6 Vehicles

Roll on Roll off ferries have operated on the route since 1954:

- Melba (1954–1961, then as a reserve until approximately 1977)
- Mangana (1961-early 1980s, then as a reserve for the Harry O'May until 1991)
- Harry O'May (early 1980s-early 1990s)
- Mirambeena (early 1990s-)

=== Melba ===
The Melba was built in 1921 as a cargo steamer to operate on the River Derwent. She commenced operations as a single-deck vehicular ferry on the Bruny Island run on 13 December 1954, with a capacity of 22 cars. She was the primary Bruny Island ferry until the arrival of the Mangana in 1961. After that date, she continued on the Bruny Island run, assisting during peak periods and when the Mangana was under repair.

In 1975, the Tasman Bridge disaster created an urgent short-term need for ferries operating across the River Derwent. The Melba, despite frequent strandings due to her deep draft, operated between Hobart and Bellerive.

=== Mangana ===
The Mangana, originally known as the George Peat, was one of two 42.06 metre-long single-deck ferries built in 1930 to operate a service across the Hawkesbury River.

After a stint operating on Auckland Harbour, the 42.06 metre long ship (now known as the Ewan W. Alison) was purchased by the Tasmanian Government in 1959. Although both the Ewan W. Alison and its sister ship the Alexander Alison were purchased from their New Zealand operators for use on the Bruny Island run, the Alexander Alison sunk on 30 April 1960 while being towed across the Tasman Sea. Seven months later, the Mangana was successfully towed across the Tasman, and commenced operations on the Bruny Island run on 27 March 1961. The Mangana was named for a Chief of the Bruny Island people, whose daughter Truganini is generally considered to have been the last full-blooded Tasmanian Aborigine.

The Melba stayed on to fill the gap left by the loss of the Mangana's sister ship.

The Mangana, with a capacity of 37 cars, was the primary Bruny Island ferry until the early 1980s, staying on as a reserve ferry for the Harry O'May until 1991.

=== Harry O'May ===
Formerly the Hong Kong ferry Man On, the Harry O'May operated the Bruny Island route in the 1980s and 1990s. Its two decks greatly increased carrying capacity relative to the smaller earlier ferries.

==== Move from Barnes Bay to Roberts Point ====
Prior to 1983, the Bruny Island end of the ferry service terminated at Barnes Bay. The trip from Kettering to Barnes Bay took around 35 minutes. The change of route to terminate at Roberts Point meant that the one-way trip time was reduced to 12 minutes.

=== Mirambeena ===
The Mirambeena began operation on the Bruny Island run in the early 1990s. Completed in 1991, it is a 52-metre two-deck ferry equipped with a Voith-Schneider propulsion system.

Name	Year built	Builder	Initial Ownership	Current Ownership / Fate	Max. Passengers
SS Melba	1921	Wilson Bros		Unknown	22 vehicles
SS Mangana previously George Peat	1930	Tasmanian Steam Navigation Company		Unknown	37 vehicles
MV Harry O May previously Man On	c.1975	Hong Kong		Launceston, Tas	48 vehicles
MV Mirambeena	1991			Dismantled 2022	74 vehicles
MV Bowen			Backspring Pty Ltd	Kelsian	30 Vehicles
MV Moongalba	1974		Stradbroke Ferries	Kelsian	30 vehicles
MV Nairana (MV Bruny Island Ferry#1)	2019	Richardson Devine Marine	Kelsian	Kelsian	36 vehicles
MV Parrabah (MV Bruny Island Ferry#2)	2019	Richardson Devine Marine	Kelsian	Kelsian	36 vehicles
