= Kettering, Tasmania =

Coastal town in southern Tasmania, Australia

Kettering
- Town
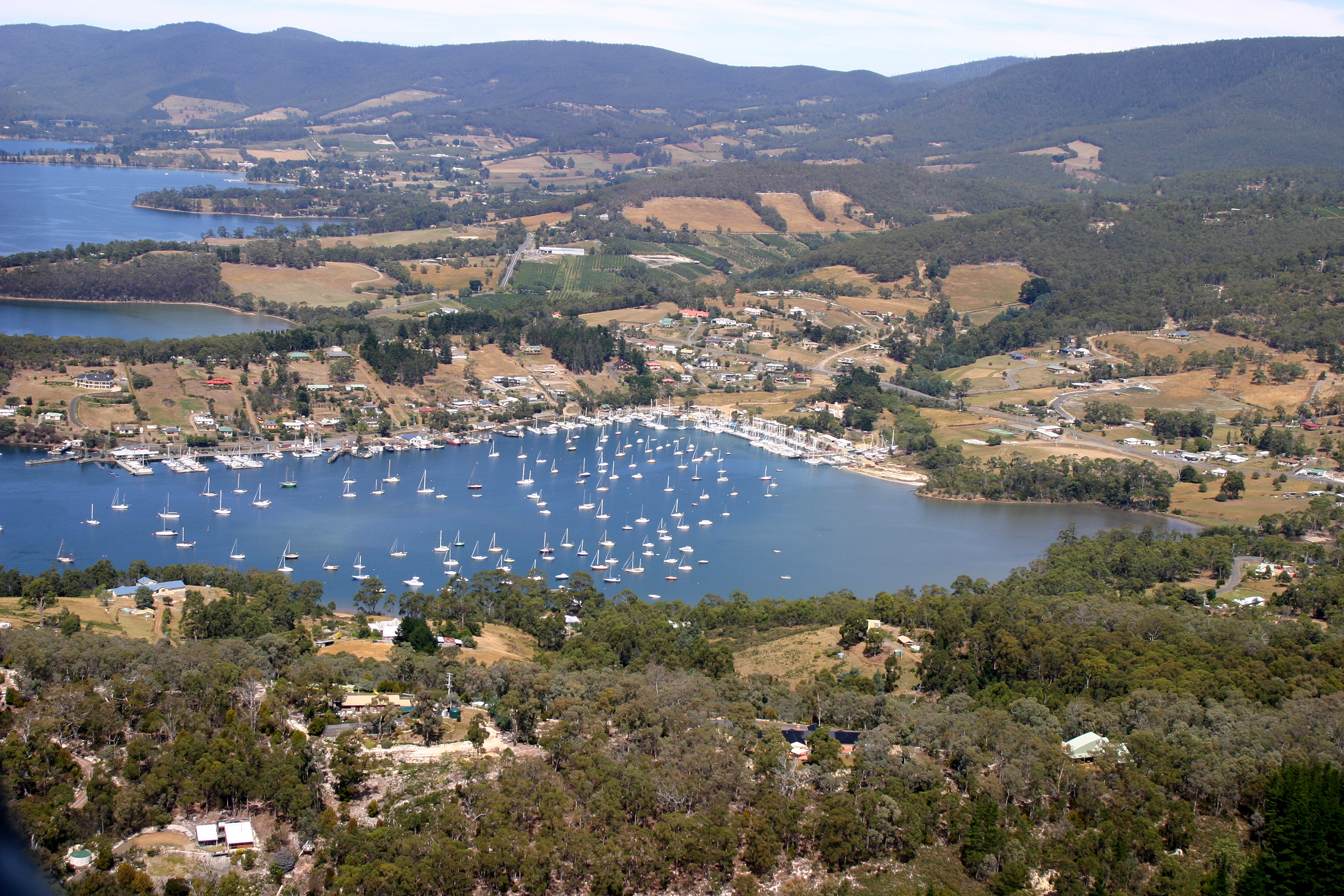
- Aerial of Kettering, c. 2006

- Coordinates: 43°07′S 147°16′E
- Country: Australia
- State: Tasmania
- LGA: Municipality of Kingborough
- Location: 32 km (20 mi) S of Hobart; 20 km (12 mi) S of Kingston; 4 km (2.5 mi) N of Woodbridge

Government
  - State electorate: Franklin
  - Federal division: Franklin
- Elevation: 12 m (39 ft)

Population
  - Total: 943 (2021 census)
- Postcode: 7155

Kettering is a small coastal town in southern Tasmania, Australia, located on the D'Entrecasteaux Channel approximately 32 km (20 mi) south of Hobart. Part of the Municipality of Kingborough, it lies within the greater Hobart metropolitan area and serves as a departure point for the Bruny Island Ferry. At the 2021 census, Kettering had a population of 943 people.

Sheltered by Bruny Island, Kettering is known for its marinas, artistic community, and scenic waterfront. Kettering has two major marinas, South Haven Marina and Oyster Cove Marina, as well as numerous private jetties and moorings, with an estimated 400 boats based in the area.

The area has a longstanding association with orcharding, particularly apples, cherries, and pears, and continues to support marine-based industries and rural properties. Its proximity to Hobart has also made it popular with commuters and those seeking a quieter lifestyle.

== History ==
=== Palawa history ===
Kettering lies within the traditional lands of the Nuenonne of Bruny Island, who maintained strong kinship, trade, and language ties with the neighbouring Muwinina (Hobart area) and Mellukerdee (Huon Valley) peoples. These South-East groups shared seasonal access to the D'Entrecasteaux Channel region, gathering for resources, ceremony, and governance under customary custodianship protocols.

==== Oyster Cove Reserve ====
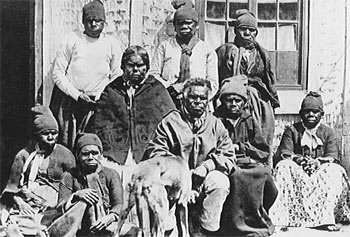
Palawa at the Oyster Cove Reserve, c. 1860s

The arrival of European sealers, whalers, and settlers in the early 1800s led to significant disruption of traditional life. Introduced diseases and violent conflict during the Black War caused a dramatic decline in the Palawa (Tasmanian Aboriginal) population. Oyster Cove, just north of Kettering, became the site of a government reserve for surviving Palawa in 1847. These individuals had previously been relocated from across Van Diemen's Land to Wybalenna on Flinders Island in the 1830s and 1840s. By the time of their transfer to Oyster Cove, only 44 individuals remained. The site had formerly operated as a convict probation station, which was repurposed to house the group.

Over the following decades, many of the reserve's inhabitants died, and by 1869 only Trugernanner (Truganini) was still living. She died in Hobart in 1876, and her ashes were scattered over the D'Entrecasteaux Channel a century later in 1976.

=== European exploration and settlement ===
The D'Entrecasteaux Channel region was first charted in 1792 by French navigator Bruni d'Entrecasteaux, for whom the channel is named. In 1795, British officer Lieutenant John Hayes of the Bombay Marine also explored the area, including the River Derwent and Oyster Cove. European sealers, timber cutters, and whalers began settling in the early 19th century, drawn by the area's dense forests and accessible bays. The hills surrounding Little Oyster Cove attracted wood splitters supplying timber to Hobart and nearby settlements.

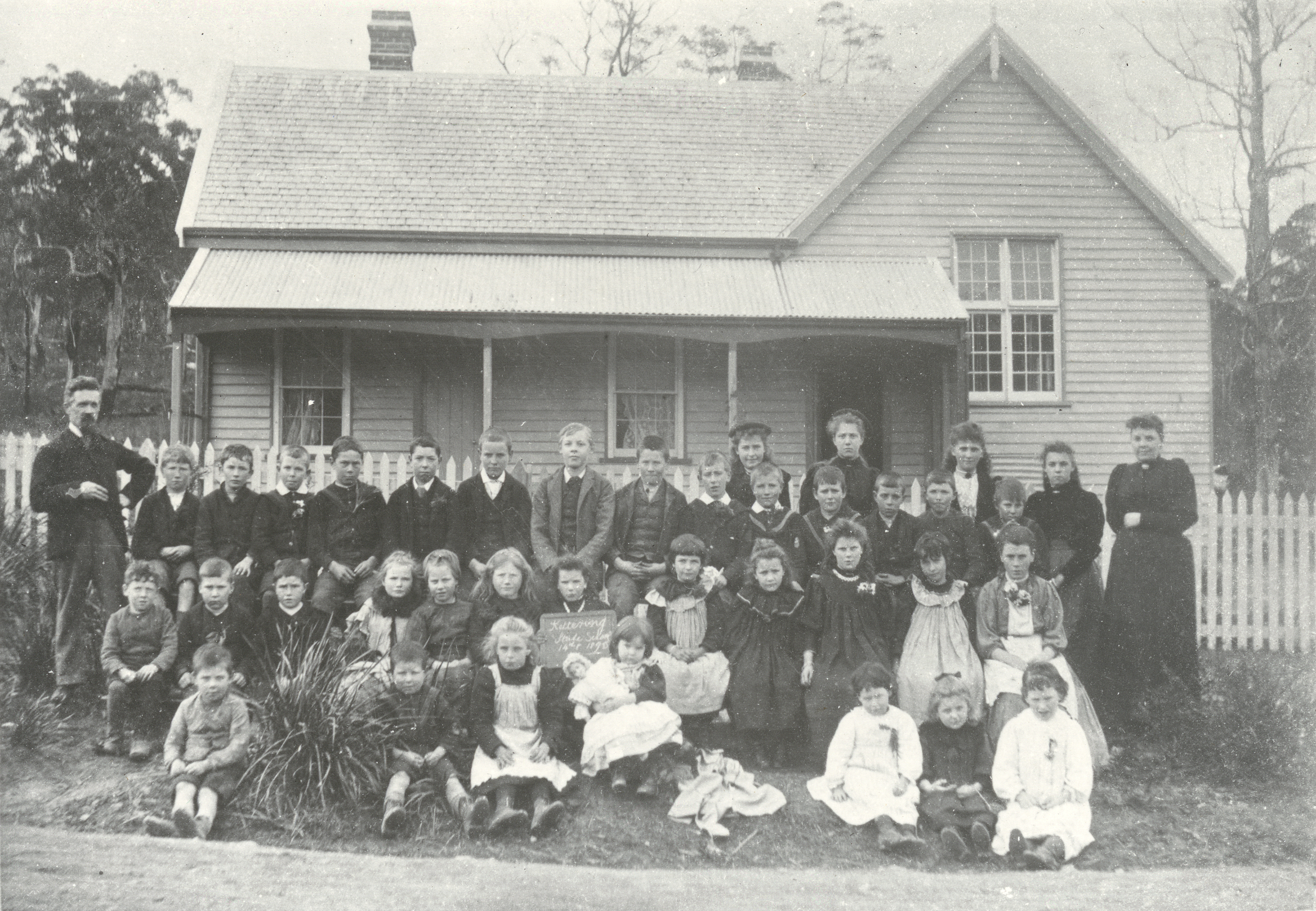
Kettering State School, c. 1896

Agricultural activity increased during the mid-1800s, with berries, fruits, and timber becoming important exports shipped north by water. By the 1850s, Little Oyster Cove had an estimated population of 150 residents. The scallop fishing industry also became prominent in the early 20th century. A post office was opened at Little Oyster Cove on 19 October 1868 and was renamed Kettering in 1892.

== Facilities and services ==
Kettering provides a range of essential services for residents and visitors. The town's central commercial hub, known as Kettering Central, offers general supplies, postal services, fuel, and takeaway food options. The Oyster Cove Inn, a prominent 1930s mansion located at the head of Little Oyster Cove, overlooks the marina and Bruny Island. Following a major refurbishment in 2009, the inn continues to operate as a hospitality venue with scenic views across the channel.

=== Bruny Island ferry service ===
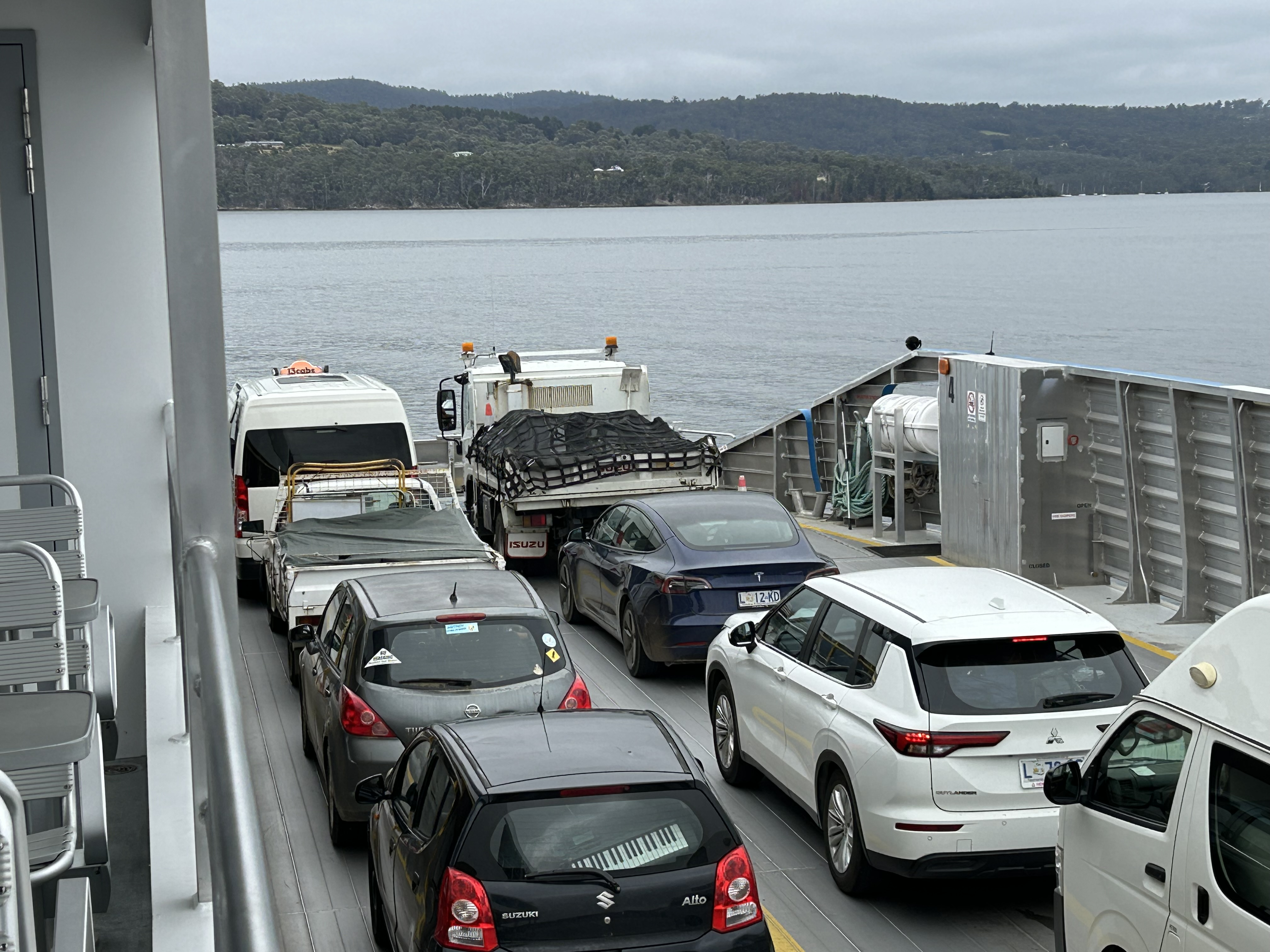
Vehicles aboard a Bruny Island ferry

Kettering is the departure point for the Bruny Island Ferry, which transports passengers and vehicles across the D'Entrecasteaux Channel to Roberts Point on Bruny Island. The service, operated by SeaLink Travel Group, is a critical transport link for residents, businesses, and the island’s growing number of visitors.

In 2018, SeaLink was awarded a ten-year contract to operate the service, replacing the long-standing Bruny Island Ferry Company. The company committed to constructing two new ferries to increase capacity and frequency. Each vessel was designed to carry up to 36 vehicles, with faster turnaround times and improved on-board facilities including passenger lounges. The first ferry entered service in late 2019, with the second delivered in 2021.

The new ferries were built locally by Richardson Devine Marine in Hobart, supporting Tasmanian shipbuilding jobs. SeaLink initially continued operating the government-owned MV Mirambeena alongside its own vessels until the full transition was complete.

To complement the upgraded fleet, the Tasmanian Government funded major infrastructure works at both Kettering and Roberts Point terminals. The $15.3 million project included new dual ramps, gantries, and modernised mechanical and electrical systems to improve vehicle loading and reduce wait times. Although the upgrades were delayed by over three years due to design changes and international supply challenges, the facilities opened in late 2024 and were immediately credited with improving operational efficiency.

A partial online booking system was introduced to manage peak demand, with 20% of each sailing reserved for drive-up customers. Discounted fares were made available to Bruny Island residents during the first year of the new contract.

=== Raptor & Wildlife Refuge ===
The Raptor & Wildlife Refuge of Tasmania is a not-for-profit organisation located on a 20 acres (8.1 ha) property overlooking Kettering and the D'Entrecasteaux Channel. It was established in 2001 by wildlife carer Craig Webb, who became widely known for his dedication to the care and rehabilitation of birds of prey.

The refuge is dedicated to the conservation and rehabilitation of Tasmania’s raptors and operates as a working care facility rather than a zoo or wildlife park. Guided tours are available by appointment and allow visitors to see species such as wedge-tailed eagles, white-bellied sea eagles, falcons, and owls. Educational resources are also provided through the refuge's on-site Education Centre.

A key feature of the refuge is its series of large flight aviaries, designed to assist with the recovery and flight training of raptors undergoing rehabilitation. These structures are among the largest of their kind in the Southern Hemisphere. Constructed using repurposed salmon aquaculture netting, the aviaries reach up to 21 m (69 ft) in height and 26 m (85 ft) in width. The facility follows a strict policy of housing different eagle species separately due to their specific care needs and temperament.

In 2024, the organisation began construction on a new purpose-built treatment facility at the Kettering site. This development is the first of its kind in Tasmania and is intended to enhance medical care for injured and ill raptors from across the state. The new facility will include up to 12 treatment bays, advanced veterinary equipment, and, for the first time, an on-site X-ray machine.

=== War memorial ===
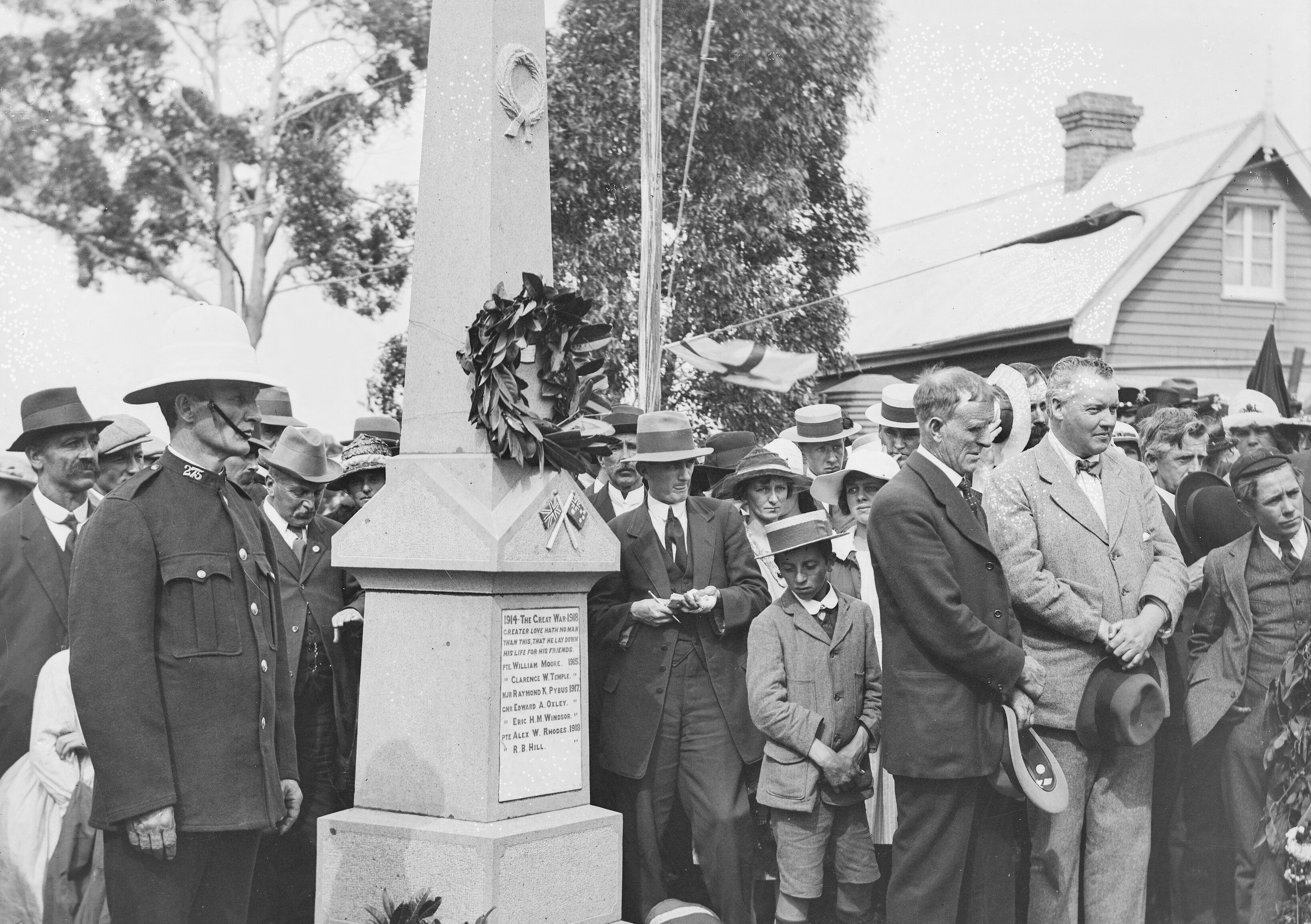
Unveiling of the Kettering War Memorial, c. 1919

A memorial to the fallen soldiers of the Kettering district was unveiled on 18 January 1919 by the Governor of Tasmania, Sir Francis Newdegate. Constructed from bluestone in the form of a miniature Cleopatra’s Needle, the monument stands on a spur above the township, offering views across the orchards, fields, and waters of the D'Entrecasteaux Channel.

An inset marble tablet bears the names of eight local men who lost their lives in the First World War: Pte. Wm. Moore, Pte. Clarence W. Temple, Major R. K. Pybus, Gnr. Eric H. Windsor, Gnr. A. Oxley, Pte. W. Rhodes, and Pte. H. B. Ball. It also carries the inscription:

The Great War, 1914–18 Greater love hath no man than this, that he lay down his life for his friends.

The unveiling ceremony was attended by a large gathering and featured music from the Claremont Military Band. The vice-regal party, arriving aboard the SS Mongana from Hobart, was met by local dignitaries before proceeding to the memorial site by motor car. Among those present were Senator John Keating, federal MP William McWilliams, members of state parliament, the Mayor of Hobart, and the Warden of Kingborough Council. The memorial was built by stonemason John Gillon of Sandy Bay.

== Arts and recreation ==
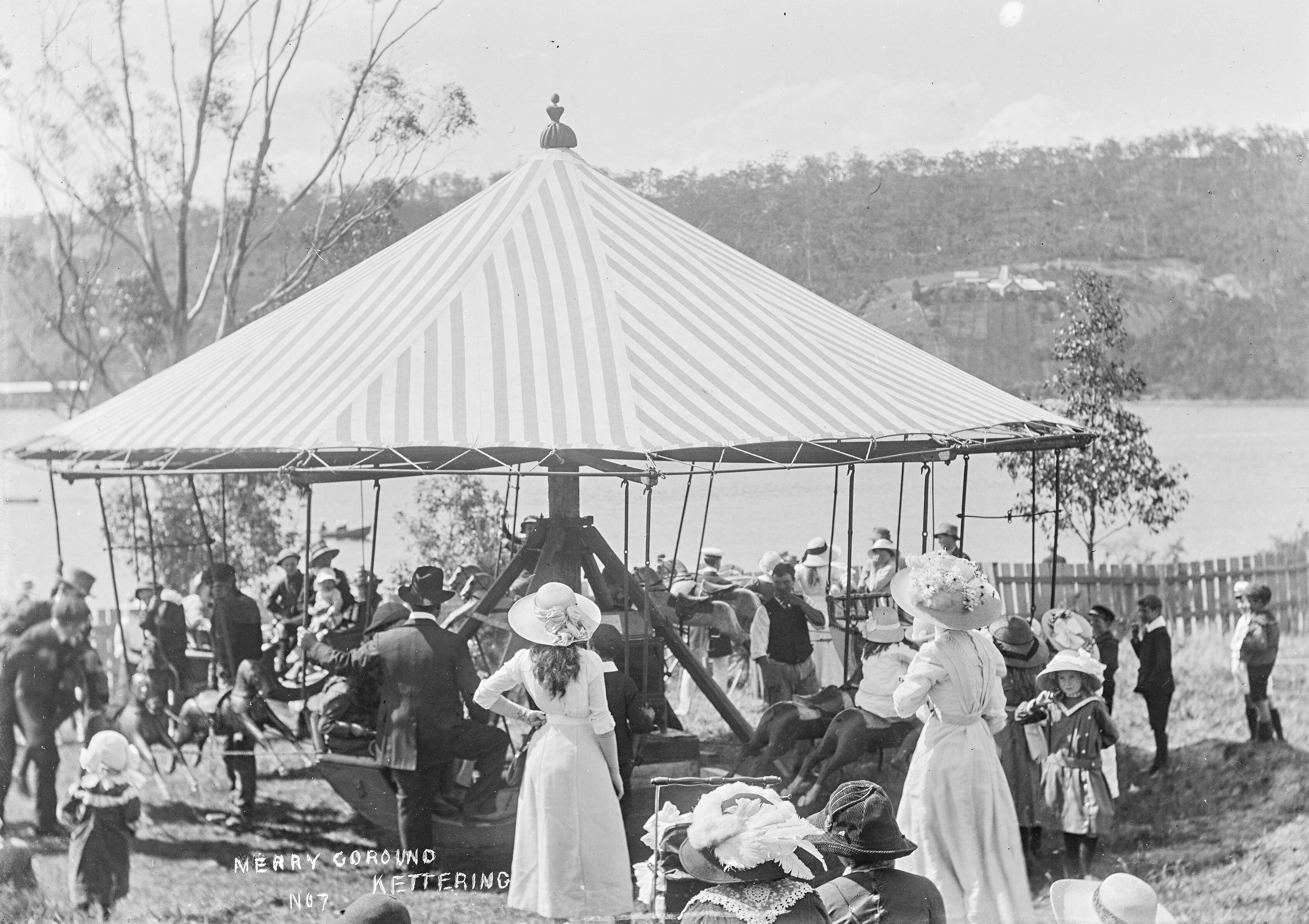
Merry-go-round at Kettering Regatta, c. 1910s

Recreational facilities include the Kettering Oval, which hosts local cricket matches during the summer months and serves as a venue for regional events such as the Taste of the Huon, a popular celebration of food, wine, and produce from the Channel and Huon Valley regions. The Kettering Community Hall, upgraded with acoustic panelling in 2004, supports a variety of uses including public meetings, art exhibitions, theatrical performances, and music concerts.

Kettering has an active artistic community. Events such as the Kettering Art Trail and regular chamber music performances have become local traditions. The Kettering Concerts series and Jazz in July have drawn regional audiences since 2004. The Kettering Community Hall hosts exhibitions, performances, and weekly badminton.

Kettering historically held an annual regatta, celebrating the town’s maritime culture with sailing races, live music, food stalls, and family-friendly activities along the waterfront.

In 2016, the town was used as the filming location for the mystery drama series The Kettering Incident, produced by Foxtel and BBC Worldwide.

== Gallery ==
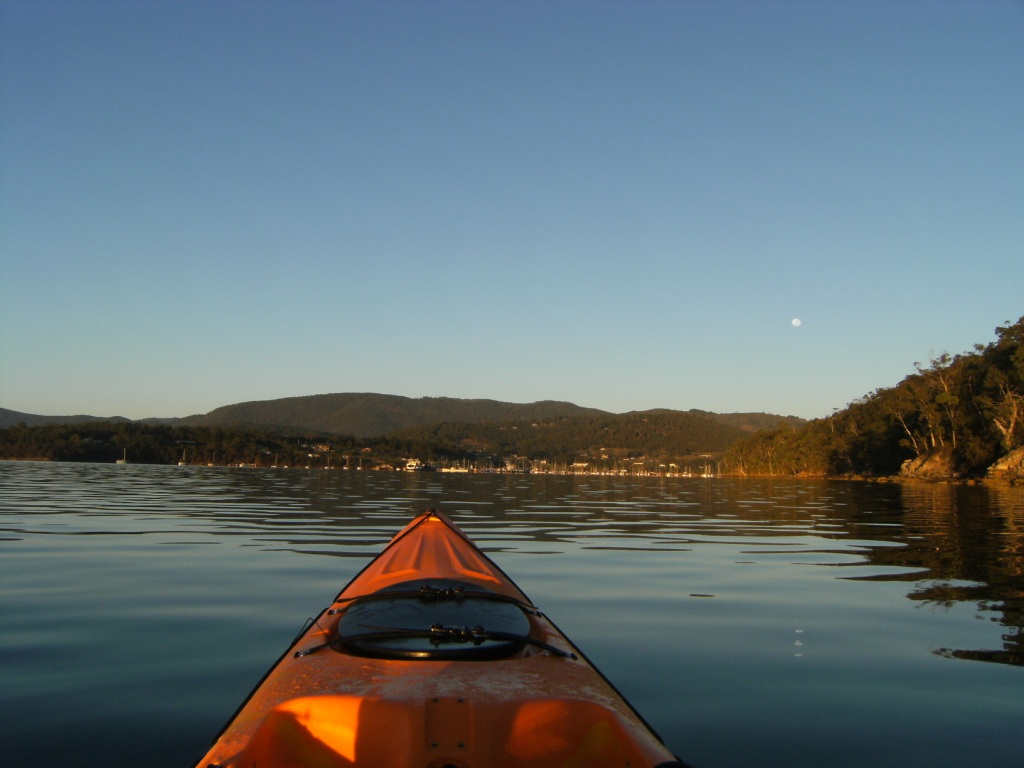
Kayak paddling

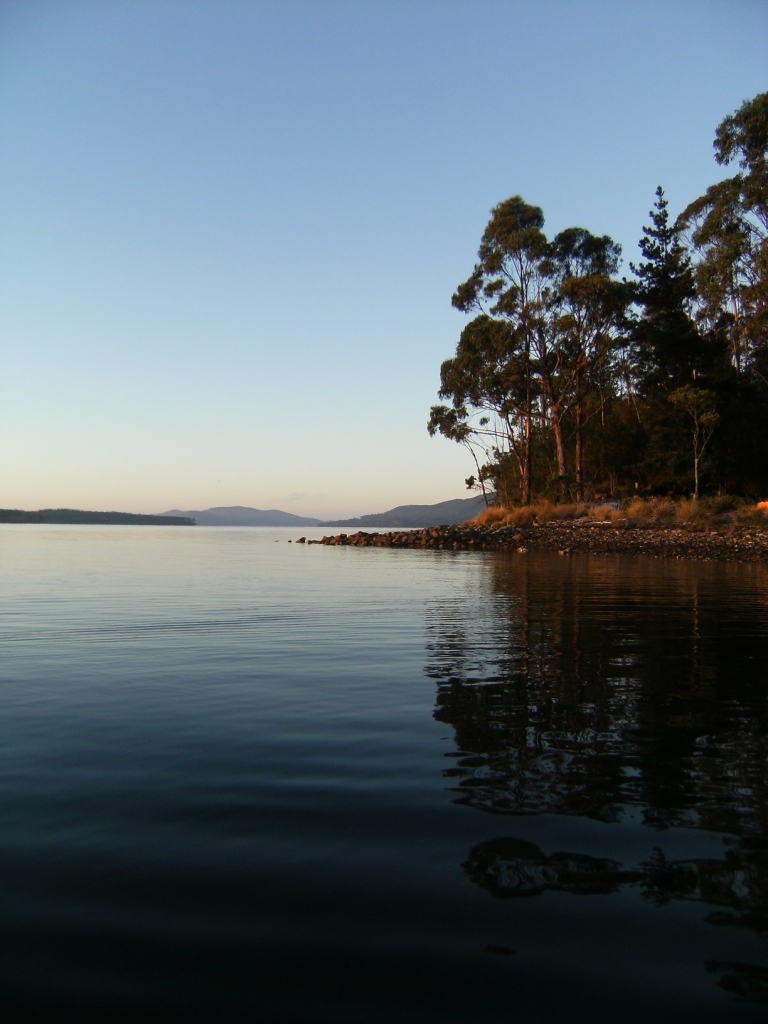
Early morning, Kettering

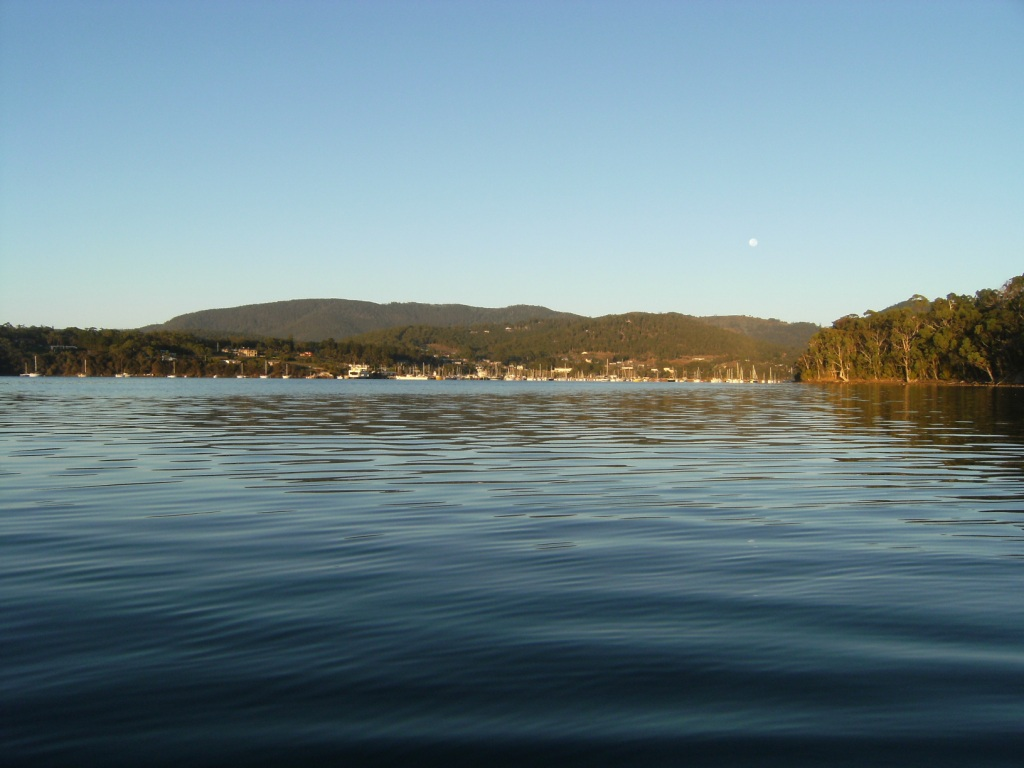
Kettering marinas

== Notable people ==
- John Earle (1865–1932) – Tasmania's first Labor Premier, serving briefly in 1909 and again from 1914 to 1916. He later represented Tasmania in the Australian Senate from 1917 to 1923. Earle died in Kettering in 1932.
- Raymond Donoghue (1920–1960) – A tram conductor and former prisoner of war, Donoghue was awarded the George Cross posthumously for his actions during a tram accident in Hobart. He was born in Hobart and had connections to the Kettering area.
- George Dibbern (1889–1962) – A German-born seafarer and author, Dibbern sailed the ketch Te Rapunga and became known for his philosophies on freedom and citizenship. The vessel was later rebuilt in Kettering, highlighting the town's maritime heritage.
- Gwen Harwood AO (1920–1995) – Poet and librettist. In 1976, Harwood and her family moved to a five-acre property in Kettering, where she spent her later years writing, fishing, and keeping poultry while her husband built boats. Her time in Kettering coincided with the publication of some of her most celebrated work. Harwood received the Grace Leven Prize for Poetry (1975), the Robert Frost Medallion (1977), and the Patrick White Award (1978), and was awarded a fellowship from the Australia Council (1973–76). She was appointed an Officer of the Order of Australia (1989) and received honorary doctorates from the University of Tasmania (1988), University of Queensland (1993), and La Trobe University (1994). Her collection Bone Scan (1988) received the C. J. Dennis Prize and the John Bray Award, while Blessed City was named The Age "Book of the Year in 1990". Her final collection, The Present Tense (1995), was posthumously shortlisted for the John Bray Award in 1996.
- William Lodewyk Crowther (1817–1885) – Surgeon, naturalist, and parliamentarian. Crowther established timber operations in the Huon district in the 1850s, later relocating sawmills to the hills above Kettering, where he owned a substantial property. He exported Tasmanian timber to other Australian colonies, New Zealand, and the Californian goldfields, including prefabricated houses for export. Crowther served as Premier of Tasmania in 1878–79 and spent his later years at Oyster Cove, where he died in 1885.
- Cameron Wheatley (born 16 April 1992) is an Australian cricketer. He made his first-class debut for the Cricket Australia XI during Pakistan’s tour of Australia on 8 December 2016. He is the head club coach of Kettering Cricket Club, where he holds multiple club records.

== Access ==
Kettering is accessible by road via the Channel Highway (Route B68), which connects the town with Kingston and Hobart to the north and Woodbridge and Cygnet to the south. The highway provides a scenic coastal drive along the D'Entrecasteaux Channel, popular with both commuters and tourists.

The town is also the departure point for the Bruny Island Ferry, with vehicle and passenger services operating daily between Kettering and Roberts Point on Bruny Island. Ample car parking is available near the ferry terminal, and a boat ramp services recreational vessels.

Kettering is serviced by Metro Tasmania bus service routes 415, 416 and 417.
