= Middleton, Tasmania =

Middleton Tasmania
- Coordinates: 43°13′38″S 147°13′57″E
- Population: 252 (2016 census)
- Postcode(s): 7163
- Location: 40 km (25 mi) SE of Huonville
- LGA(s): Kingborough, Huon Valley
- Region: Hobart, South-east
- State electorate(s): Franklin
- Federal division(s): Franklin
Localities around Middleton:
Garden Island Creek	Garden Island Creek, Flowerpot	D'Entrecasteaux Channel
Garden Island Creek	Middleton	D'Entrecasteaux Channel
Gordon	Gordon	D'Entrecasteaux Channel

Middleton is a rural residential locality in the local government areas (LGA) of Kingborough and Huon Valley in the Hobart and South-east LGA regions of Tasmania. The locality is about 40 kilometres (25 mi) south-east of the town of Huonville. The 2016 census recorded a population of 252 for the state suburb of Middleton.

== History ==
Permanent European settlement began in Middleton from the 1850s, however, the area had been utilised earlier by the timber and sealing industries and has always been of significance to the Nuenonne band of the South East tribe of Aboriginal people. Middleton was gazetted as a locality in 1967. It is believed that the name was derived from the wife of an early settler. The area was originally known unofficially as Long Bay.

== Geography ==
The waters of the D'Entrecasteaux Channel form the eastern boundary.

== Road infrastructure ==
Route B68 (Channel Highway) runs through from north-east to south-east.
