= Prasophyllum amoenum =

Dainty leek orchid

Conservation status
- Endangered (EPBC Act)

Scientific classification
- Kingdom: Plantae
- Clade: Tracheophytes
- Clade: Angiosperms
- Clade: Monocots
- Order: Asparagales
- Family: Orchidaceae
- Subfamily: Orchidoideae
- Tribe: Diurideae
- Genus: Prasophyllum
- Species: P. amoenum

Binomial name
- Prasophyllum amoenum D.L.Jones

Species of orchid

Prasophyllum amoenum, commonly known as the dainty leek orchid or Snug leek orchid, is a species of orchid endemic to Tasmania. It has a single tubular, green leaf with a purplish base and between five and twelve light green, dark brown and white flowers. In 2007, the entire population was estimated to be about 600 plants.

== Description ==
Prasophyllum amoenum is a terrestrial, perennial, deciduous, herb with an underground tuber and a single tube-shaped leaf, 120–300 mm (5–10 in) long and 2–4 mm (0.08–0.2 in) wide, the free part 40–60 mm (1.6–2.4 in) long. Between five and twelve flowers are loosely arranged along a flowering spike 30–50 mm (1–2 in) long reaching to a height of 150–350 mm (6–10 in). The flowers are greenish, 8–10 mm (0.3–0.4 in) long and 7–9 mm (0.3–0.4 in) wide with dark brown lateral sepals, white and red petals and a white or pinkish labellum. As with others in the genus, the flowers are inverted so that the labellum is above the column rather than below it. The dorsal sepal is a narrow egg-shape to lance-shape, 8–10 mm (0.3–0.4 in) long and about 3 mm (0.1 in) wide. The lateral sepals are up to 8–10 mm (0.3–0.4 in) long and spread apart from each other. The petals are narrow linear to lance-shaped, 7–9 mm (0.3–0.4 in) long and about 2 mm (0.08 in) wide. The labellum is 8–10 mm (0.3–0.4 in) long and turns upwards, sometimes extending above the lateral sepals and its edges are wavy. Flowering occurs in January.

== Taxonomy and naming ==
Prasophyllum amoenum was first formally described in 1998 by David Jones from a specimen collected near Snug and the description was published in Australian Orchid Research. The specific epithet (amoenum) is a Latin word meaning "pleasant" or "delightful".

== Distribution and habitat ==
The dainty leek orchid grows with rushes, sedges and grasses in south-eastern Tasmania.

== Conservation ==
Prasophyllum amoenum is only found in five populations containing a total of 500-600 plants. In some years, no plants have been observed in flower because of drought or browsing. The species is classified as Vulnerable under the Tasmanian Threatened Species Protection Act 1995 and as Endangered under the Commonwealth Government Environment Protection and Biodiversity Conservation Act 1999 (EPBC) Act.
