= James Hyndes Gillies =

Australian metallurgist and pioneer of hydroelectricity in Tasmania

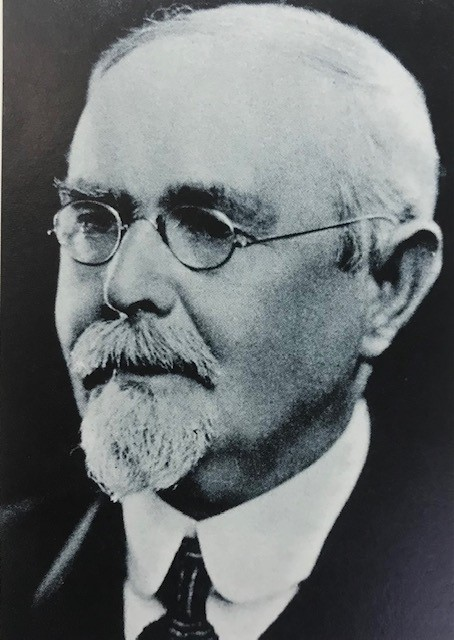
Portrait of James Hyndes Gillies

James Hyndes Gillies (11 November 1861 – 26 September 1942) was the pioneer of hydro-electricity in Tasmania, Australia and a metallurgist who patented a method for the electrolytic extraction of zinc. He was granted approval in 1909 by the Tasmanian parliament to construct and operate the Great Lake Scheme (which became known as Waddamana Power Station) in the Central Highlands of Tasmania, which served the state until 1960.

== Early life ==
Gillies parents had migrated from the Isle of Skye and had a traditional Presbyterian upbringing on a farm in Maitland, NSW. At 24, Gillies married Annie Griffiths and after a number of years working in real estate in Eastern Sydney, qualified as a metallurgist from the NSW School of Mines and moved to regional NSW with Annie and their four children.

It was during his career as a metallurgist that Gillies invented an electrolytic process for the treatment of complex zinciferous ores and in 1904-7, took out a series of patents in America, Europe, Mexico and Australasia. Gillies' process involved first crushing complex zinc-lead ore into coarse screenings, partially roasting it, fuming off the zinc and lead as oxides, dissolving the zinc oxides in sulphuric acid, filtering the solution to remove lead sulphate, arsenic, antimony and cadmium, then passing an electric current through the remaining solution to cause deposition of pure metallic zinc on the cathode. A syndicate of backers to the process later became known as the Complex Ores Company. The process required large amounts of electricity however.

== The Great Lake Scheme ==
In 1908 Gillies arrived in Tasmania in search of a way to produce large amounts of power for his zinc process. Gillies presented two options for a hydro-electricity scheme using the Ouse and Shannon rivers to the Tasmanian Government, option A was for a government scheme and option B was for a private scheme, the Government held by a narrow majority. of the time and with the state in economic recession, insisted the scheme be privately constructed and operated

In December 1909, the Complex Ores Act passed the Tasmanian parliament with the requirement that Gillies’ company had 4 years to complete the scheme or the Government would have the right to buy it back. The Complex Ores Company’s subsidiary Hydro-Electric Power and Metallurgical Company, Limited (HEPMCo), was formed in February 1911.

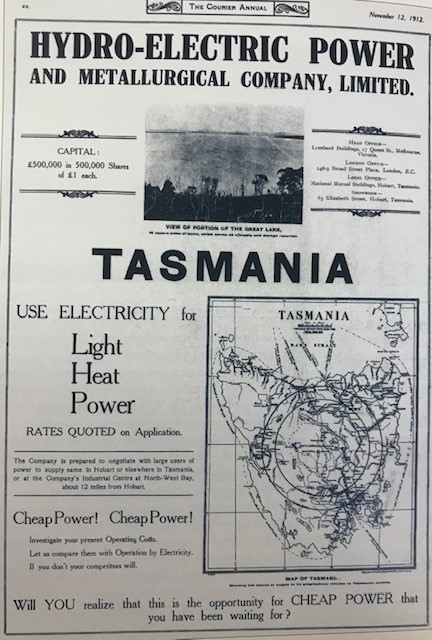
HEPMCo Advertisement in the Weekly Courier annual supplement for 1912

== Commencement of works ==
Gillies travelled to London to secure capital investment from investors for the Great Lake Scheme and orders for turbines, alternators, switch gear, transformers and transmission line were placed in America as soon as possible thereafter, with delivery for the steel and cables expected by February 1912 and the machinery for the power station, March 1912. In June 1912, HEPMCo contracted a Melbourne firm to build AC and DC distribution systems along the main roads leading to Hobart.

The site was progressing well, including the 6 mile access road that wound up through the hills surrounding Waddamana, until the winter of 1912 hit, one of the harshest on record, meaning that work became impossible due to frost and snowstorms, with rocks in many places being covered with six inches of ice. The sun didn't reach the worksite at all during the day and the Ouse river was frozen a foot deep six feet from each bank.

By the end of the 1912 winter, rumours swirled on the project failing which cast doubt on the HEPMCo’s financial viability. Head Engineer John Butters and Gillies both took every possible opportunity to calm the public.

The arrival of 1913 turned the tide with a change in Government. In April, a 12 month extension was granted and passed through the lower house with the support of the speaker, John Evans, who had supported the Complex Ores Act in 1909. £150,000 in extra capital was recommended as a figure to complete the Great Lake Scheme.

== Government takeover ==
The situation presented the then Liberal Government with challenges. It held a delicate majority and yet the Labour Party was strongly opposed to any extension of time or financial assistance. A final 6 month extension was granted, bringing completion to July 1915, but no money was granted. The Labour party began manoeuvring to buy the scheme and the then-Premier Albert Solomon arranged for Evan Parry, the chief electrical engineer of New Zealand’s Public Works Department, to compile a report on the scheme and its ultimate viability.

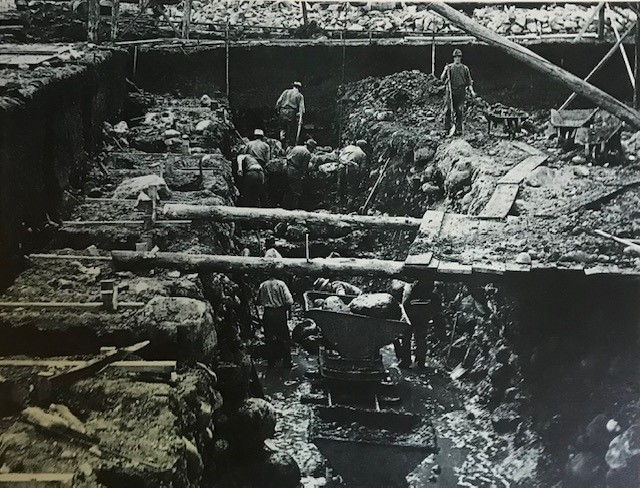
Excavating the Tailrace Tunnel under Waddamana Power Station 1912

Evan Parry’s report complimented the design of the Great Lake Scheme, quality of work, low prices paid for equipment and the unit cost at which it would deliver power, once completed. The report recommended the Tasmanian Government take over the scheme.

Two days after this, the Solomon government was defeated and the Labour party returned to Government. Moves were quickly made to itemize and document the assets of HEPMCo and the Hydro Electric Power and Metallurgical Company Purchase Bill was introduced to the Tasmanian parliament on 3 July 1914 and again after considerable negotiation, passed on 24 July 1914.

== Gillies' later life ==
Gillies left Tasmania at 65 with no pension and no assets. He returned to Sydney where he continued to work on various inventions, taking out patents for improved car lighting, sound-proofing with diatomaceous earth and improvements in refrigeration methodologies. The Gillies Pension Bill was introduced into parliament in 1925 by a Labour Government to provide a pension for Gillies, which recognised that he had been overcome by overwhelming economic forces whilst at the same time had initiated an economic revolution in Tasmania. The pension amount was three hundred pounds per year.

When the bill was introduced into the House of Assembly, there was agreement on both sides that the State was in debt to Gillies for his great contribution to its advancement. The Bill passed all stages in the House of Assembly without opposition, it was however, rejected in the Legislative council on three occasions, once without debate. Albert Ogilvie who as Attorney General introduced the first Bill, became Premier in 1934. In 1935 he introduced a similar bill which went through both houses quietly, ten years after it was first introduced.

== Death ==
Gillies died at the age of 79 on 26 September 1942 at South Camberwell, Melbourne, his remains were cremated. He was survived by his wife, three sons and a daughter.
