= D'Entrecasteaux Channel =

Water between Bruny Island and Tasmania

- Location in Tasmania

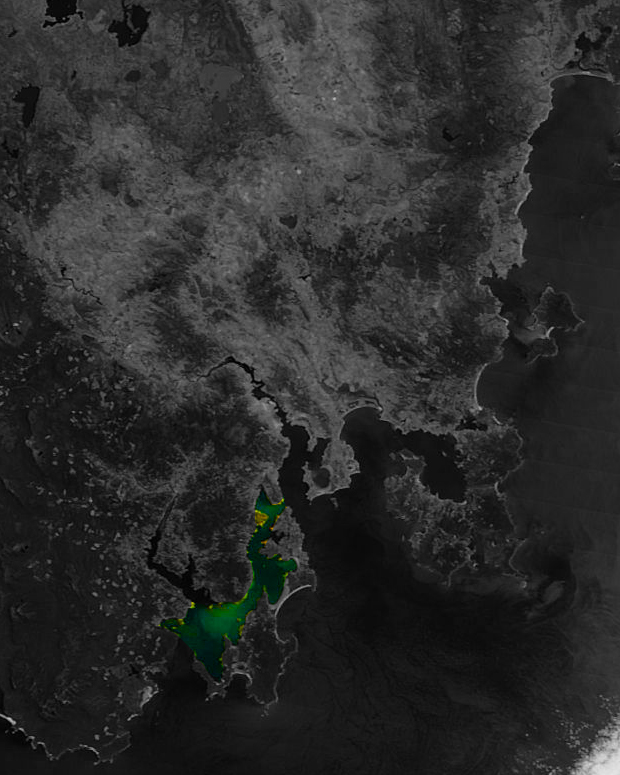
- South East Tasmania with D'Entrecasteaux Channel highlighted.
- Location: South East Tasmania
- Coordinates: 43°13′S 147°17′E
- Type: Channel
- Etymology: Vice-Admiral Bruni D'Entrecasteaux
- Primary inflows: Derwent River, Huon River
- Primary outflows: Tasman Sea
- Ocean/sea sources: South Pacific Ocean
- Settlements: Margate, Snug, Kettering, Woodbridge, Flowerpot, Middleton, Gordon

The D'Entrecasteaux Channel /ˌdɒntrəˈkæstoʊ/ is a body of water located between Bruny Island and the south-east of mainland Tasmania, Australia. The channel forms the estuarine mouth for both the Derwent and Huon Rivers and empties into the Tasman Sea of the South Pacific Ocean. It was sighted by Abel Tasman in 1642 and later surveyed in 1792 by Bruni d'Entrecasteaux.

Towns along the channel include Margate, Snug, Kettering, Woodbridge, Flowerpot, Middleton and Gordon.

== Geography and environment ==
The D'Entrecasteaux Channel stretches approximately 60 km (37 mi) from the Derwent Estuary to the Huon River. It is bounded by Tasmania’s south-east mainland to the west and Bruny Island to the east, which shelters it from the open ocean. Notable features include North-West Bay, Great Bay, and the Huon River mouth.

The region has experienced significant foreshore erosion, particularly around Coningham and Middleton. Local communities have implemented erosion control measures such as sandbagging.

The channel supports seagrass beds, reefs, and estuarine habitats. It remains an important breeding ground for scallops, although bottom dredging was banned in 1969 due to ecological damage. Scallops are now collected by hand-diving.

Aquaculture, particularly Atlantic salmon and shellfish farming, is prominent throughout the channel. However, light pollution from farming infrastructure increasingly affects night-sky photography, including views of the aurora australis.

== History ==
=== Palawa history ===
The D'Entrecasteaux Channel region forms part of the ancestral waters and lands of the Nuenonne people of Bruny Island. The Nuenonne shared cultural and linguistic ties with the Muwinina (Hobart region) and Mellukerdee (Huon Valley) peoples. These groups practised seasonal migration, harvesting shellfish and marine resources, and conducting ceremony under systems of shared custodianship.

=== French exploration, 1792 ===
In April 1792, Vice-Admiral Bruni d'Entrecasteaux arrived aboard Recherche and Espérance. Anchoring in North-West Bay, his crew made landfall and documented evidence of Aboriginal activity, such as fire smoke, footpaths, and tree marks. Naturalist Jacques Labillardière conducted scientific collections of Tasmanian flora and fauna.

=== British exploration by John Hayes, 1793 ===
In 1793, British officer John Hayes sailed from Calcutta aboard the Duke of Clarence and Duchess on a commercial and exploratory voyage. He entered the channel in late April, unaware of d'Entrecasteaux's earlier visit. Hayes charted the coastline, renamed the Rivière du Nord to River Derwent, and introduced English names such as Seton's Strait (for the Channel), William Pitt's Isle (Bruny Island), and King George's Plains.

=== Scientific expedition of Nicolas Baudin, 1802 ===
French explorer Nicolas Baudin returned to North-West Bay in 1802 aboard Géographe and Naturaliste. His crews set up an observatory to view the solar eclipse, carried out coastal mapping, and collected scientific specimens. The visit was brief and overlapped with prior work by Hayes and d'Entrecasteaux.

== Gallery ==
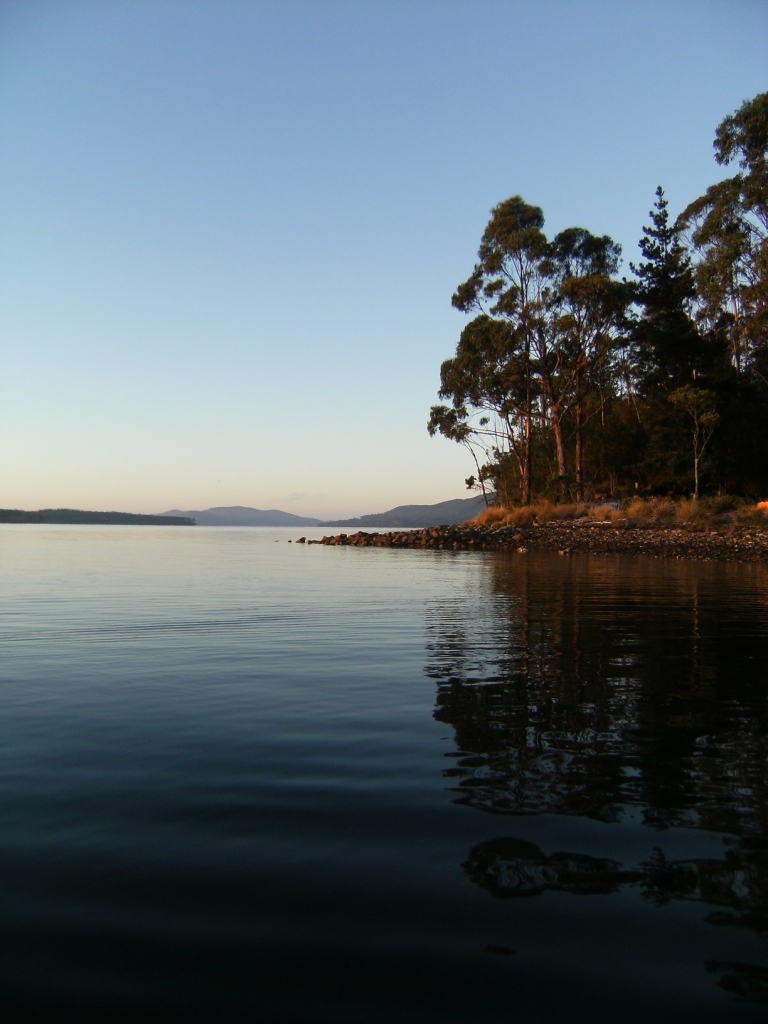
D'Entrecasteaux Channel from Kettering.

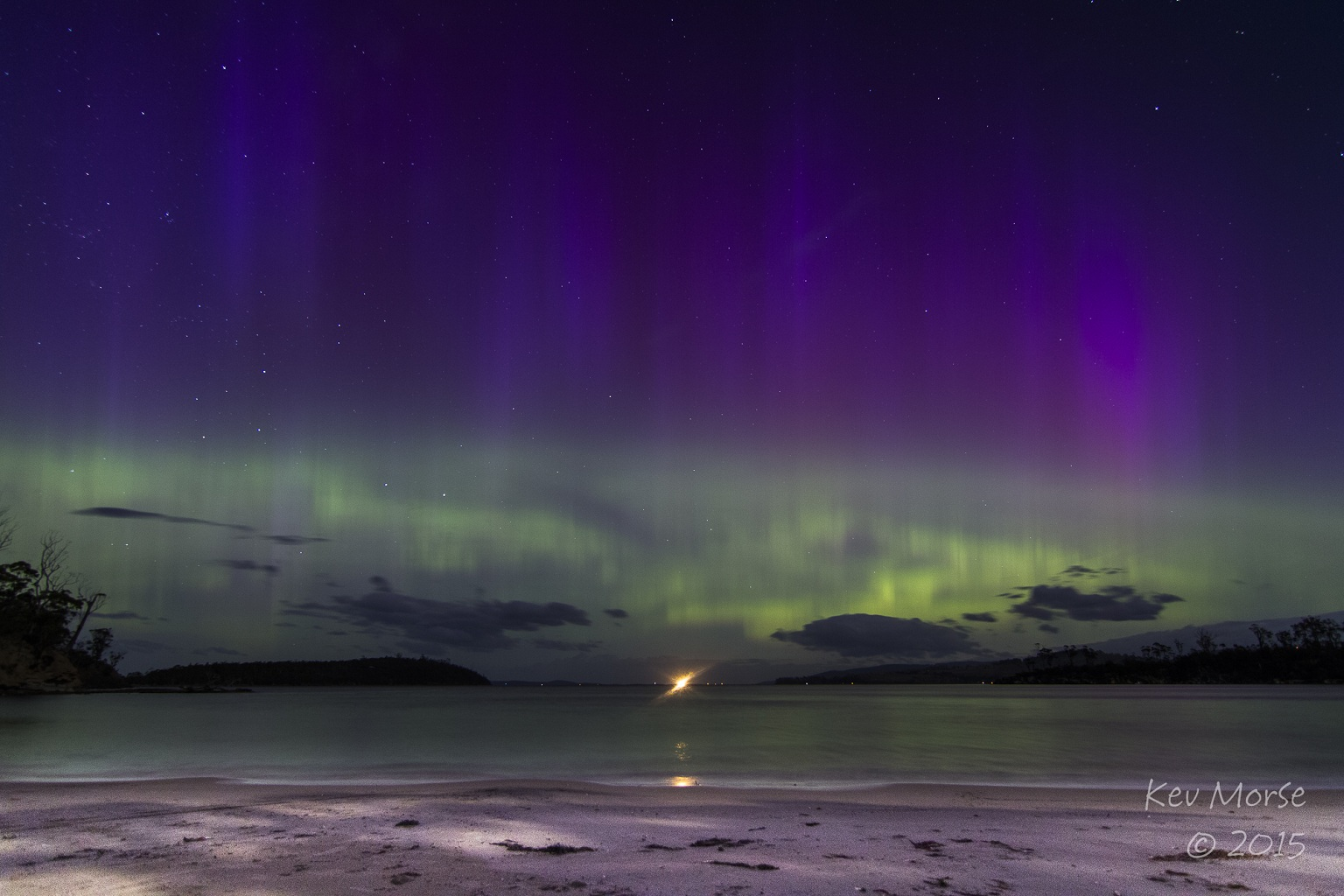
Aurora Australis over D'Entrecasteaux Channel near Cygnet.
