= North-West Bay =

Bay in south-east Tasmania, Australia

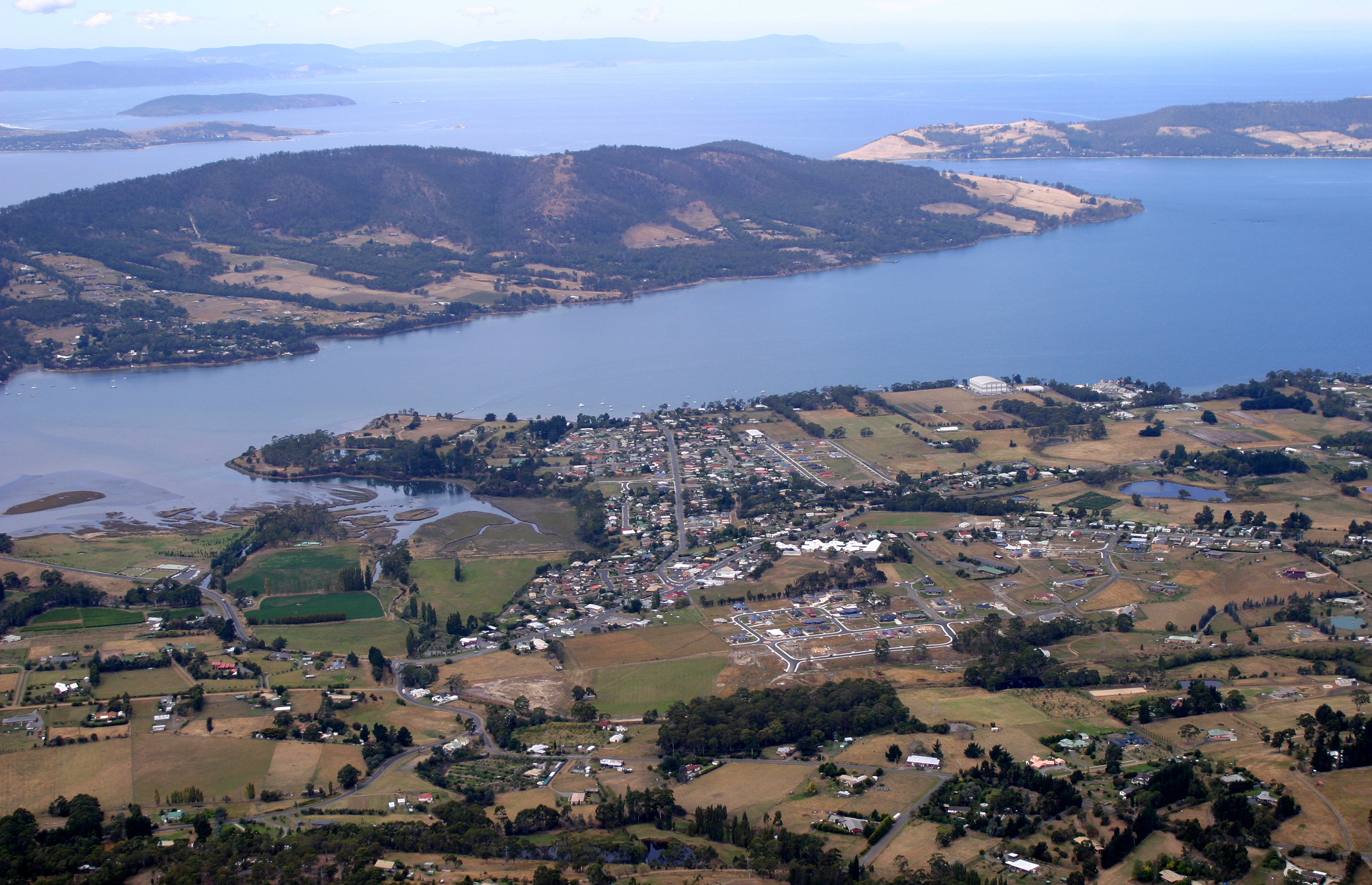
- Aerial of Margate and North-West Bay, c. 2006

- Location in Tasmania
- Location: Tasmania, Australia
- Coordinates: 43°1′17.55″S 147°16′55.61″E
- Type: Bay
- Primary inflows: D'Entrecasteaux Channel
- Basin countries: Australia
- Settlements: Margate, Howden

North-West Bay is a broad coastal bay in the south-east of Tasmania, Australia, situated along the D'Entrecasteaux Channel between the towns of Margate and Howden. The bay forms part of the larger waterway system that separates mainland Tasmania from Bruny Island and is utilised for recreational boating, fishing, and aquaculture.

== History ==
=== Indigenous heritage ===
The area surrounding North-West Bay lies within the traditional lands of the Nuenonne people, a band of the South-East Tasmanian Aboriginal nation. The Nuenonne inhabited Bruny Island and adjacent mainland areas, including the D'Entrecasteaux Channel region, for over 34,000 years. They engaged in seasonal migrations, utilising bark canoes to navigate the waterways for hunting, fishing, and trade. The bay and its resources held significant cultural and spiritual value for the Nuenonne people.

=== European exploration ===
In April 1792, the French expedition led by Rear Admiral Bruni d'Entrecasteaux arrived in the region aboard the ships Recherche and Espérance, during their search for the lost expedition of La Pérouse. The expedition charted various parts of the Tasmanian coast, including the channel now bearing d'Entrecasteaux's name. They named the large bay at the top of the channel "Baie du Nord-Ouest" (North-West Bay) and anchored there to collect fresh water. Observations of Aboriginal activity, such as smoke and footpaths, were recorded during their stay.

In 1793, British explorer Captain John Hayes entered the same body of water during his voyage aboard the ships Duke of Clarence and Duchess. Unaware of d'Entrecasteaux's prior naming, Hayes referred to the bay as "Fairlies Harbour" and assigned English names to several geographic features in the area. Although some of Hayes's names were adopted, the French designation for North-West Bay ultimately prevailed.

== Geography and use ==
North-West Bay opens into the D'Entrecasteaux Channel and is sheltered from the open ocean by Bruny Island. The bay supports various recreational and commercial activities, including marinas, aquaculture leases (notably for salmon and shellfish), and small-scale tourism. The town of Margate lies at the northern end of the bay and serves as a launch point for vessels. Shoreline development remains relatively low-density, preserving natural features and scenic views across the water.

== Gallery ==
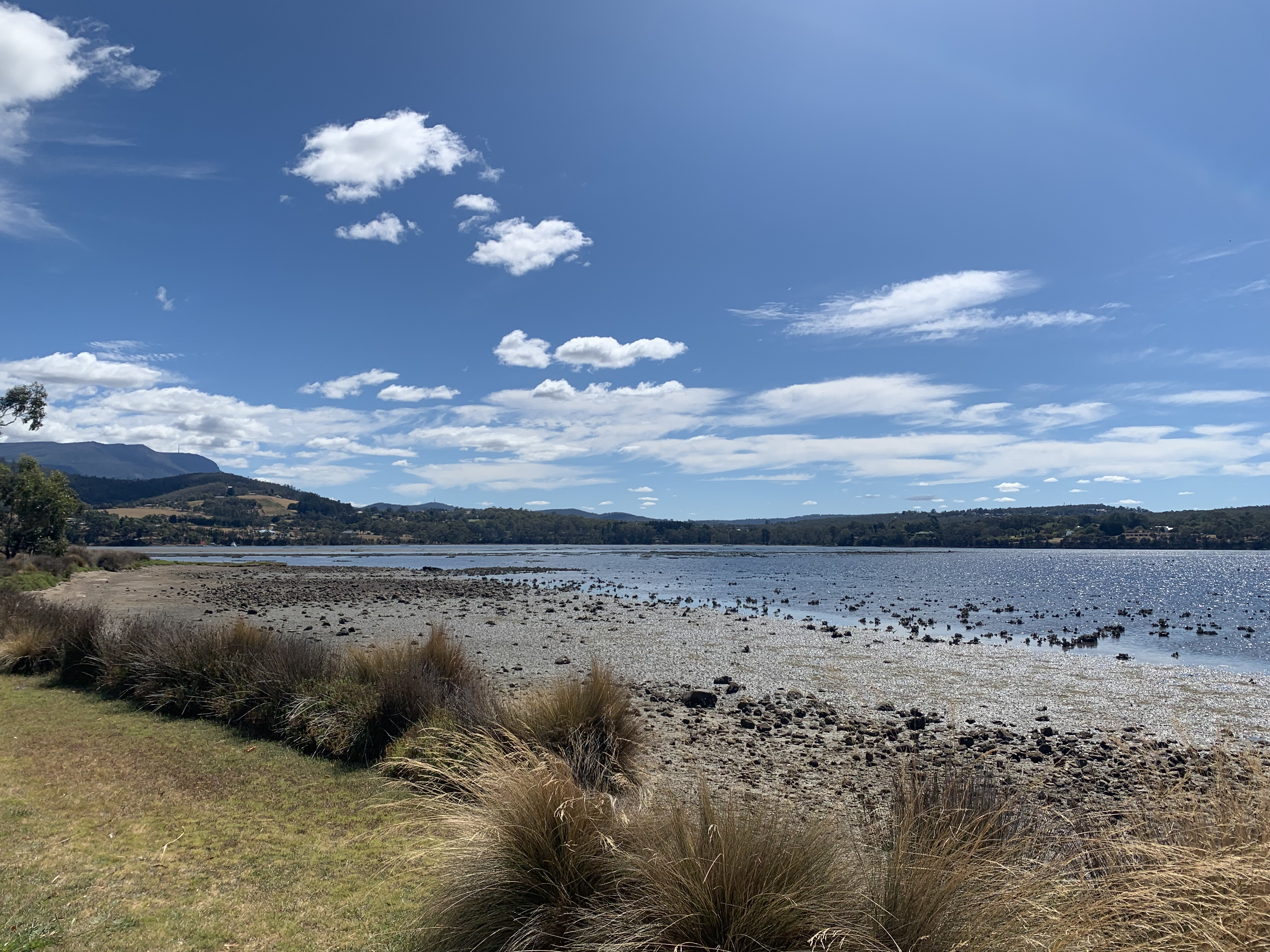

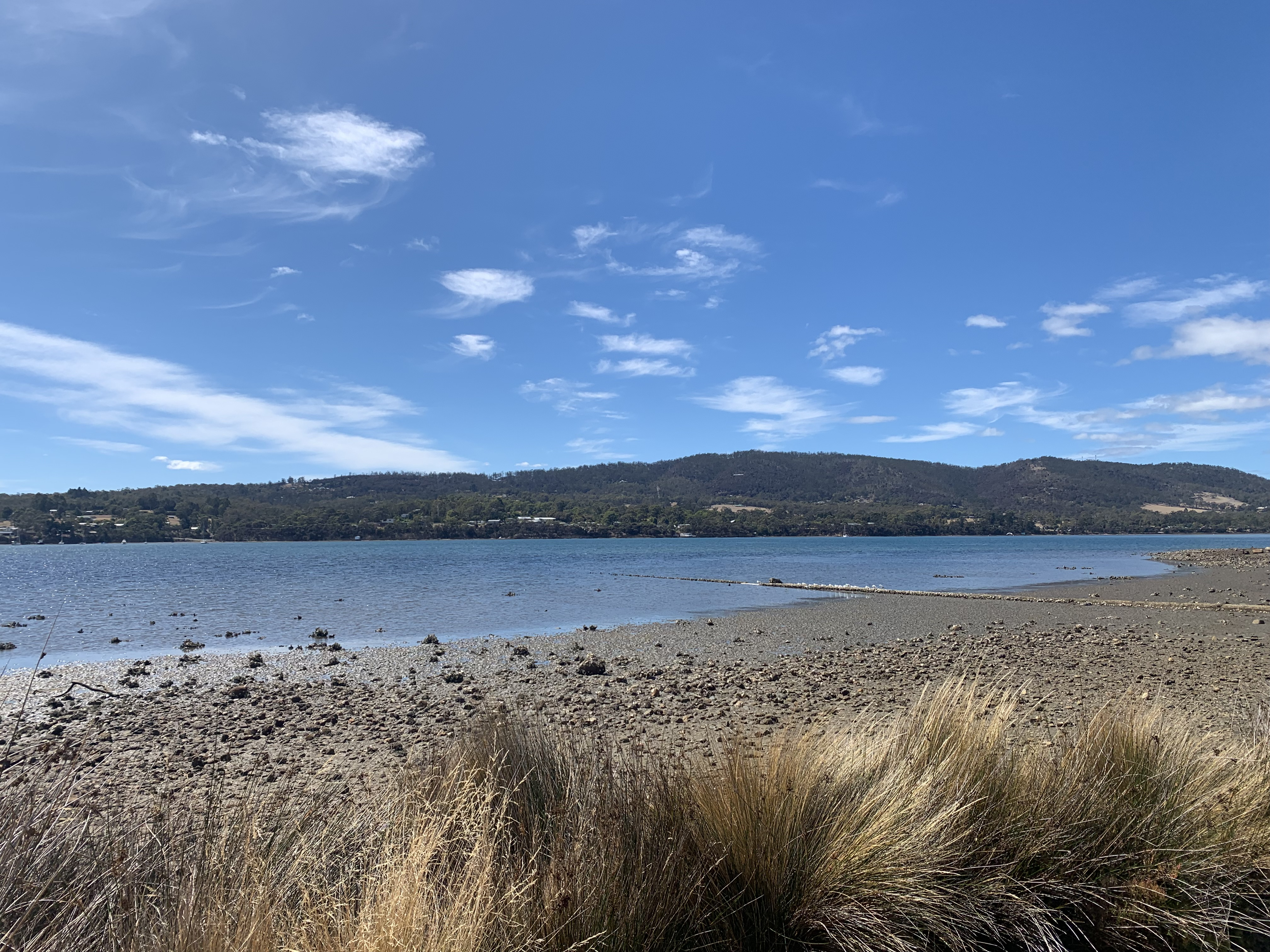

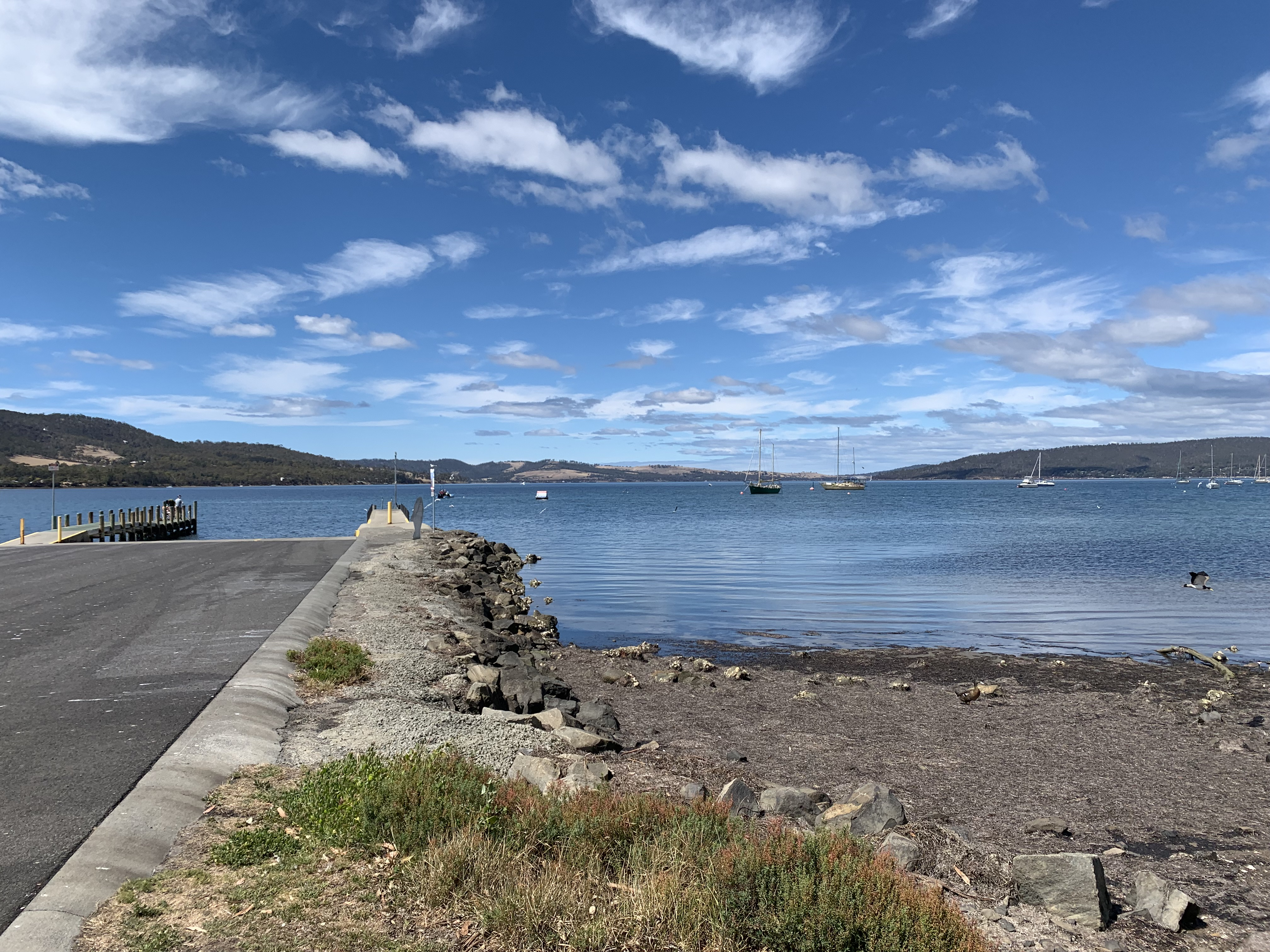
Margate Boat Ramp

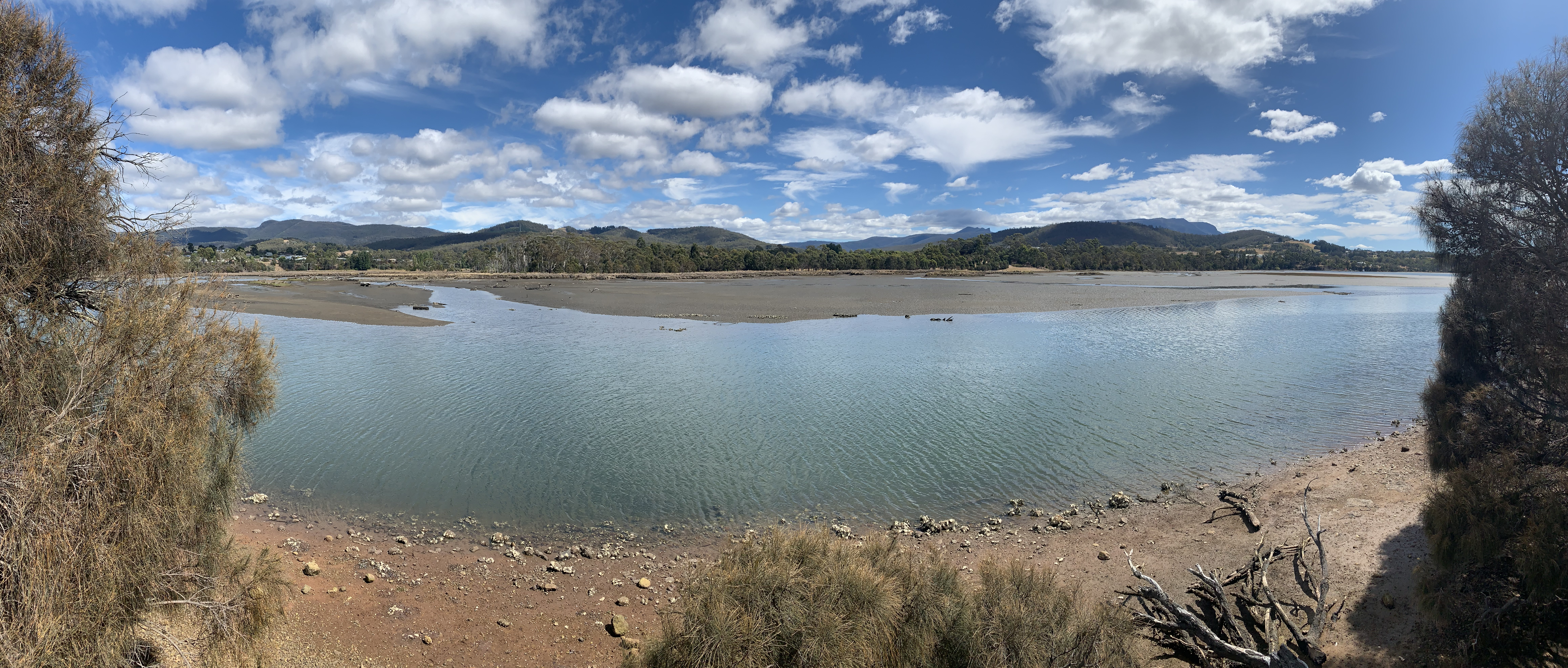
Panorama of North-West Bay

== See also ==
- D'Entrecasteaux Channel
- Bruni d'Entrecasteaux
- Margate, Tasmania
