= Garden Island Creek =

- Town
- Coordinates: 43°15′S 147°10′E
- Country: Australia
- State: Tasmania
- LGA: Huon Valley Council, Kingborough Council
- Location: 14 km (8.7 mi) NE of Dover; 18 km (11 mi) ESE of Geeveston; 27 km (17 mi) S of Grove

Government
  - State electorate: Franklin
  - Federal division: Franklin

Population
  - Total: 282 (SAL 2021)
- Time zone: UTC+10 (AEST)
  - Summer (DST): UTC+11 (AEDT)
- Postcode: 7112
- Mean max temp: 16.4 °C (61.5 °F)
- Mean min temp: 6.8 °C (44.2 °F)
- Annual rainfall: 884.2 mm (34.81 in)

Garden Island Creek is a rural locality located 42 kilometres (26 mi) south west of the Hobart City Centre, Tasmania, Australia, within the Huon Valley Council and Kingborough Council local government areas. The locality was originally settled during the 19th century, primarily due to the large supply of good timber readily available and the local geography which enabled vessels to go up the creek during high tide to collect the wood. At the 2021 census, Garden Island Creek had a population of 282. The area currently has a number of permanent residents along with those that visit for weekends and holidays.

Garden Island Creek Post Office opened in around 1875 and closed in 1969.

There was a local cricket team in the early part of the 20th century, although no team currently exists. There is a small beach at Garden Island Creek that has a direct view of Garden Island (a short distance across the water), and is reported to have the appearance of a fish when photographed from the air. There is a garden nursery in the community and, within a short drive, a number of vineyards and fruit farms.

During the mid-1970s, Garden Island Creek was home to an ashram housing around fifty followers of the Divine Light Mission. The community disbanded after most of the members converted to Christianity.
