= Fingal Valley =

Valley region in the North-east of Tasmania

- Region
- Coordinates: 41°35′52″S 148°03′44″E
- Country: Australia
- State: Tasmania

Population
  - Total: 1,788 (2021 census)

The Fingal Valley is a rural region, located in the North-East of Tasmania, in the local government area Break O'Day, and Northern Midlands. The population of the region was 1,788 from the 2021 census from all of the localities that are in the Fingal Valley region. The most populated locality in the Fingal Valley region is St Marys, while the least populated locality in the Fingal Valley region is Mangana.

== Localities ==
- Fingal
- St Marys
- Avoca
- Rossarden
- Mangana
- Mathinna
- Cornwall
- Royal George
- Gray

== Roads ==
- Esk Highway (A4)
- Elephant Pass Road (A4)
- St Marys Pass (Section of the Esk Highway (or A4))
- Mathinna Road (B43)
- Mangana Road (B42)
- Rossarden Road (B42)
- Storys Creek Road (B42)
- Royal George Road (C301)
- Tower Hill Road (C429)
- Mount Nicholas Road (C430)
- Catos Road (C421)
- Upper Esk Road (C401)
- Mathinna Plains Road (C423)
- Cornwall Road
- Valley Road
- Irish Town Road
- Top Marshes Road
- German Town Road
- Gardiners Creek Road

== Gallery ==
Aerial view of Fingal, St Marys, Avoca, and Royal George in the Fingal Valley region
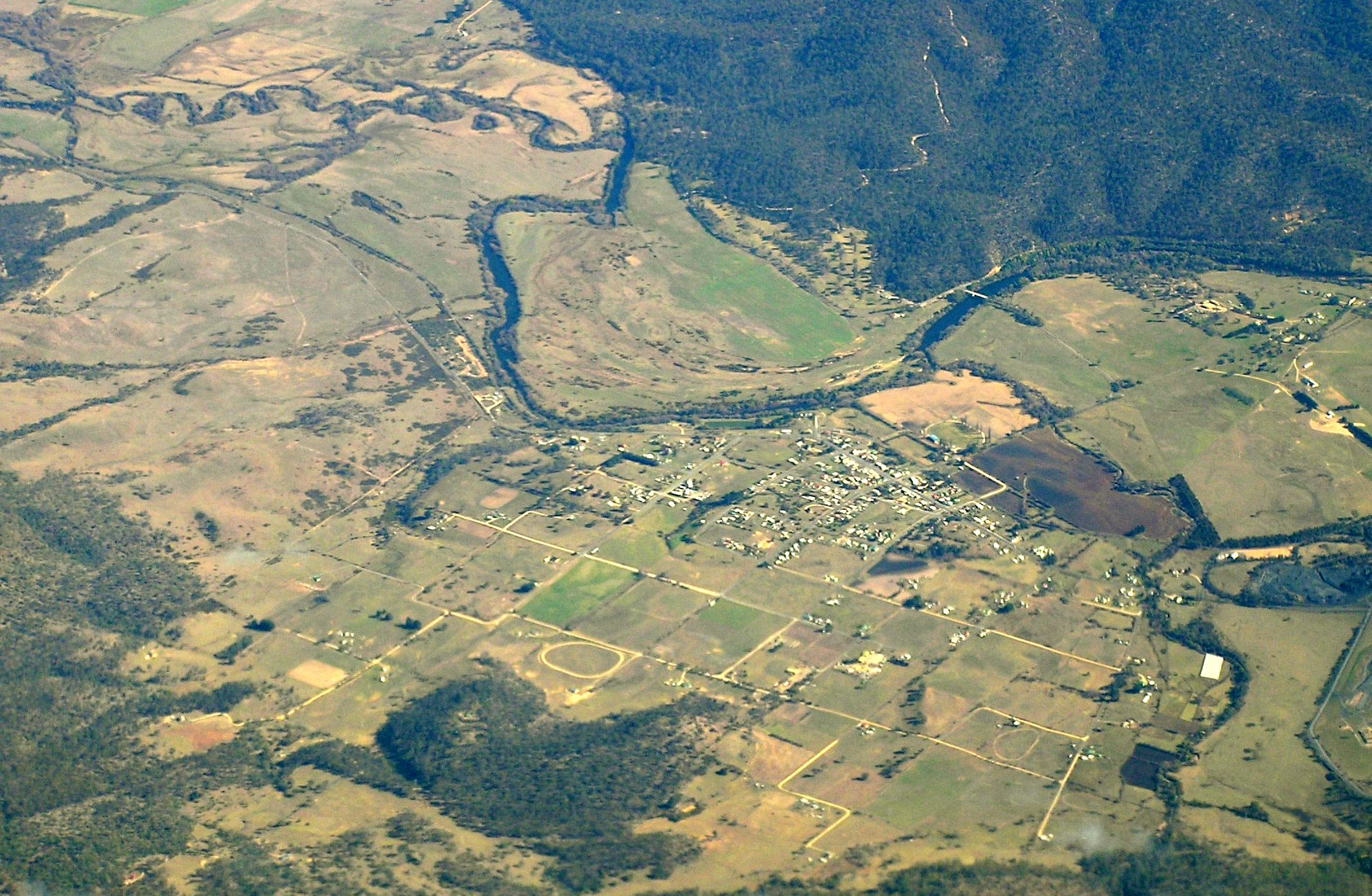

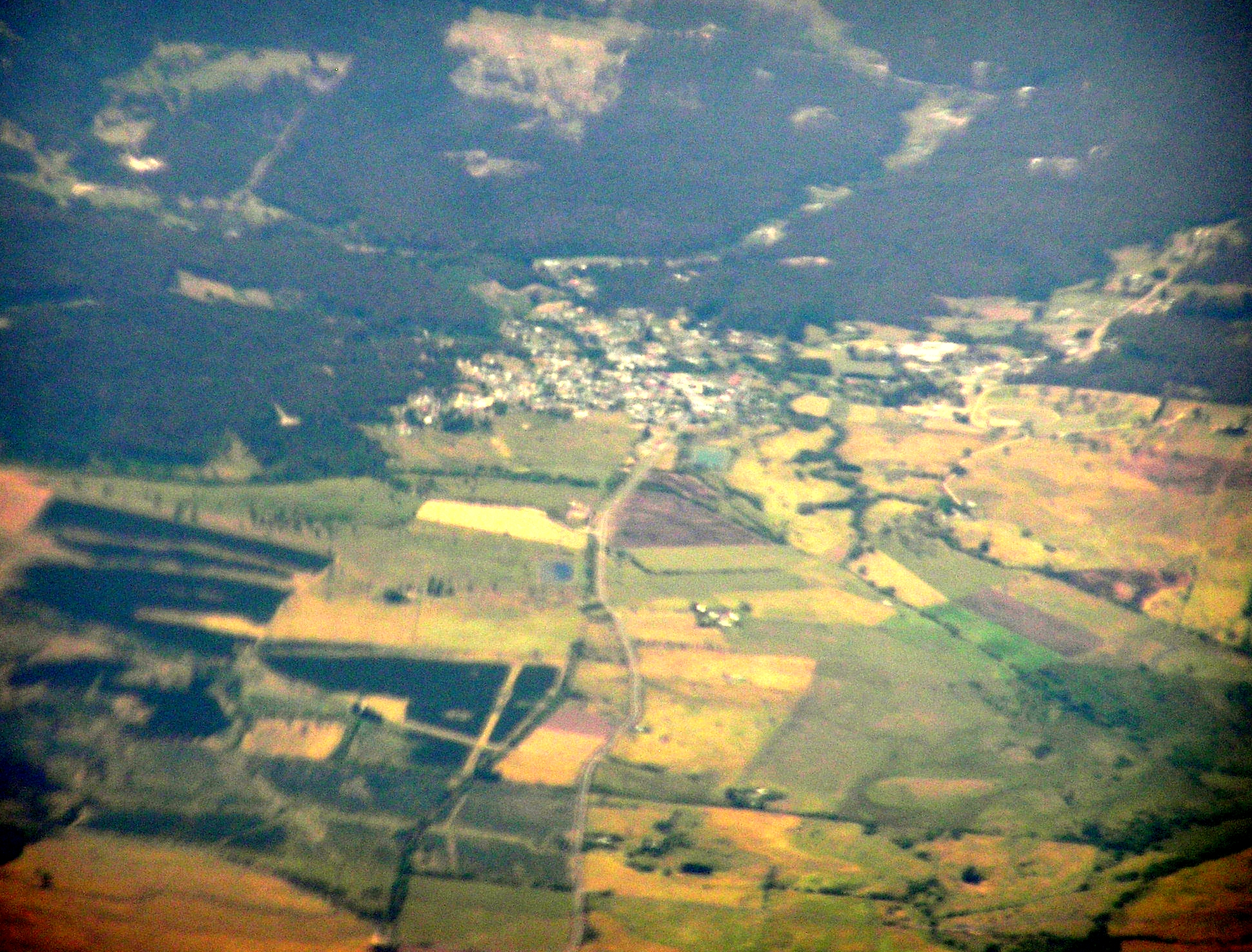

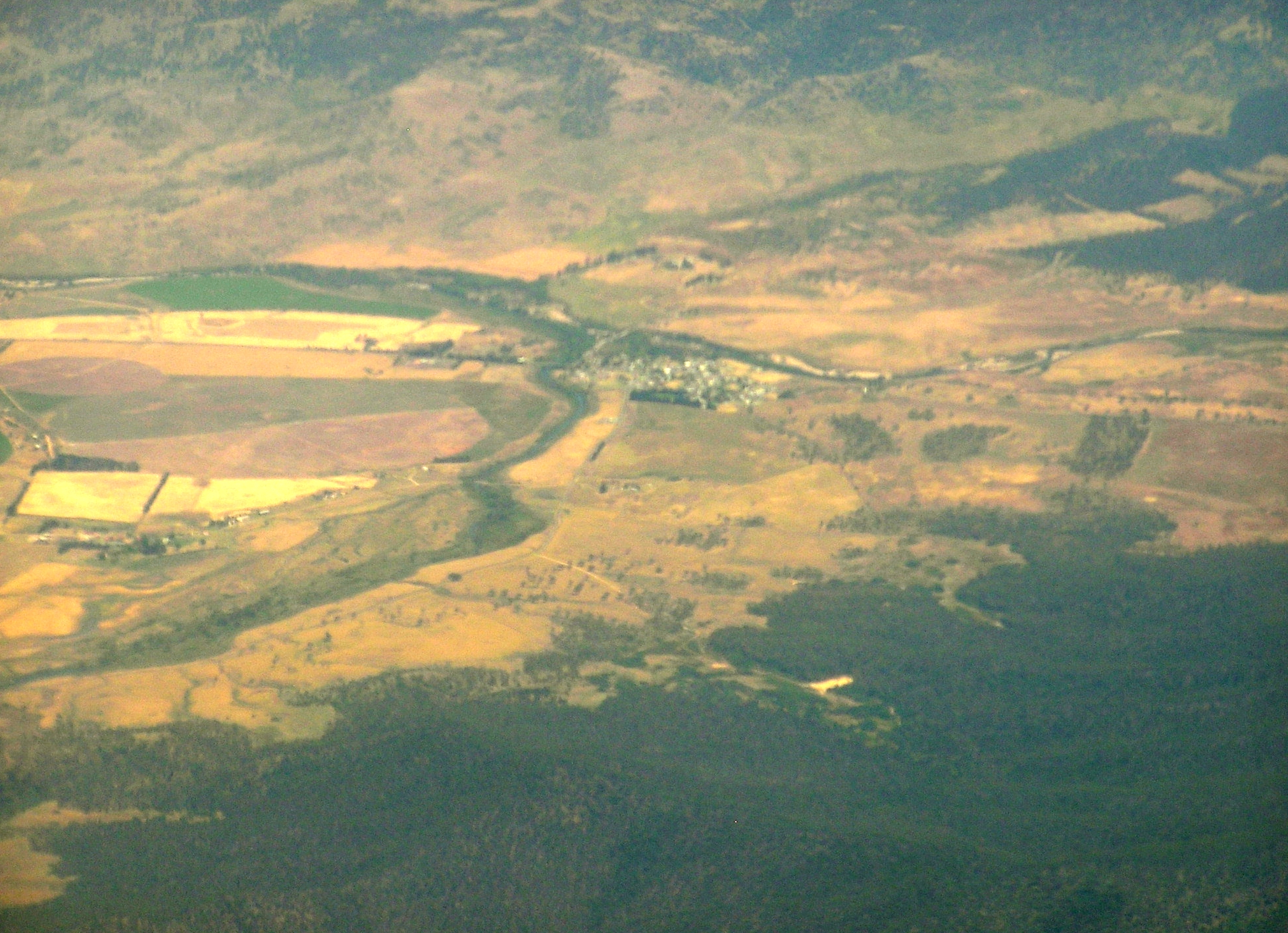

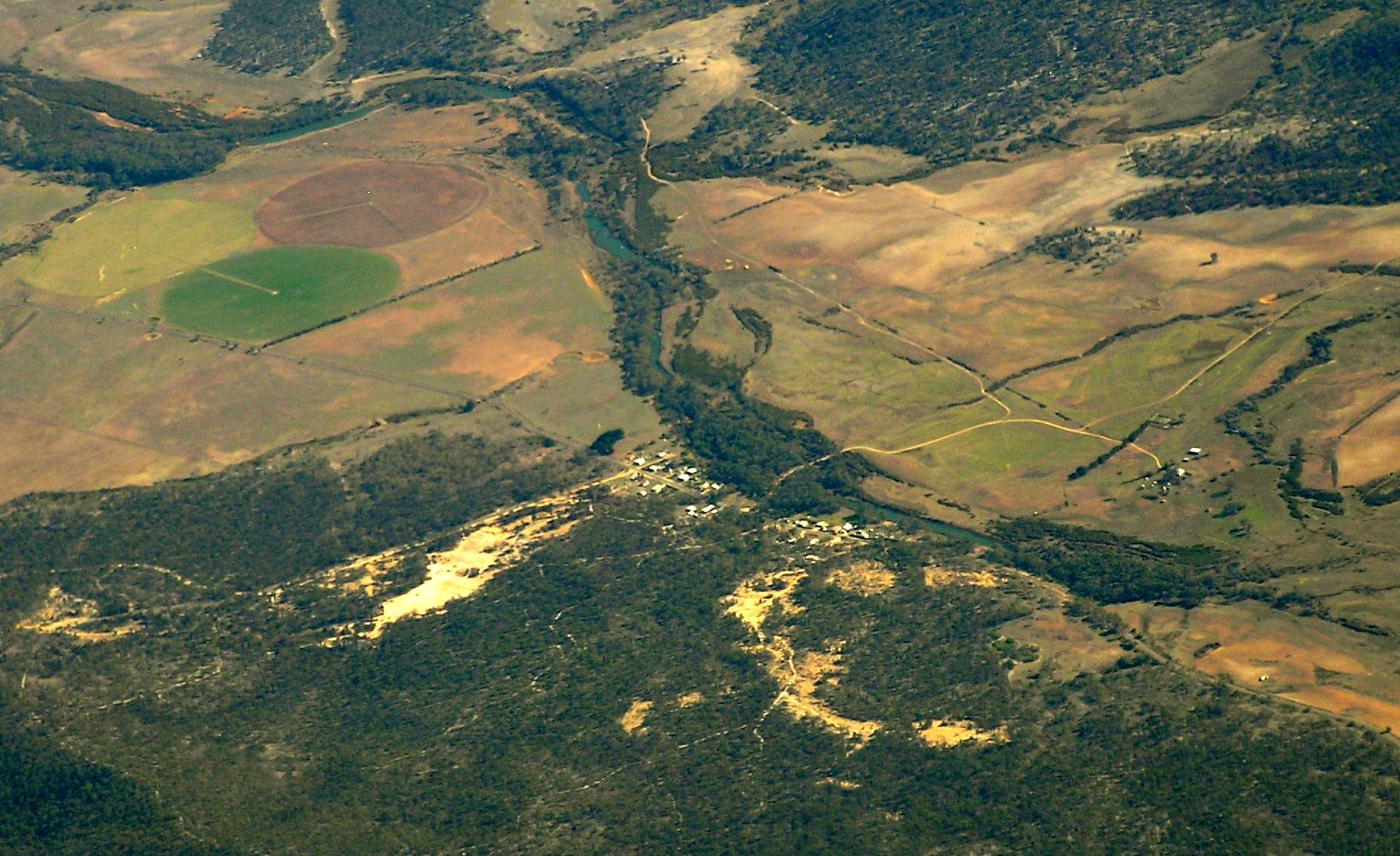
