= Cornwall, Tasmania =

Cornwall
- Town
- Coordinates: 41°33′13″S 148°08′16″E
- Country: Australia
- State: Tasmania
- Region: North-east
- LGA: Break O'Day
- Location: 44 km (27 mi) SW of St Helens

Government
  - State electorate: Lyons
  - Federal division: Lyons

Population
  - Total: 82 (2021 census)
- Postcode: 7215
Localities around Cornwall
St Marys	Upper Scamander	St Marys
Mathinna	Cornwall	St Marys
Fingal	Cullenswood	Gray

Cornwall is a rural locality in the local government area (LGA) of Break O'Day in the North-east LGA region of Tasmania. The locality is about 44 kilometres (27 mi) south-west of the town of St Helens. The 2016 census recorded a population of 65 for the state suburb of Cornwall.

== History ==
Cornwall was gazetted as a locality in 1973.

It was named by Governor King in 1804, after Cornwall in Britain, which never mined coal, but rather tin mining.

== Geography ==
Cornwall is completely surrounded by the locality of St Marys.

== Road infrastructure ==
Route A4 (Esk Highway) passes to the south of the locality, from there, Cornwall Road provides access.
