= Seymour, Tasmania =

Seymour
- Town
- Coordinates: 41°44′51″S 148°17′55″E
- Country: Australia
- State: Tasmania
- Region: North-east
- LGA: Break O'Day
- Location: 61 km (38 mi) S of St Helens

Government
  - State electorate: Lyons
  - Federal division: Lyons

Population
  - Total: 25 (2016 census)
- Postcode: 7215
Localities around Seymour
Chain of Lagoons	Chain of Lagoons	Tasman Sea
Douglas-Apsley	Seymour	Tasman Sea
Douglas-Apsley	Douglas River	Tasman Sea

Seymour is a rural locality in the local government area (LGA) of Break O'Day in the North-east LGA region of Tasmania. The locality is about 61 kilometres (38 mi) south of the town of St Helens. The 2016 census recorded a population of 25 for the state suburb of Seymour.

== History ==
Seymour was gazetted as a locality in 1965. The name was in use by 1845.

It was originally a coal mining town.

== Geography ==
The waters of the Tasman Sea form the eastern boundary.

== Road infrastructure ==
Route A3 (Tasman Highway) passes through from south to north.
