= Fingal Line =

Railway line in Tasmania, Australia

Overview
- Status: In use
- Owner: Government of Tasmania
- Termini: Conara Junction; Duncan Colliery ( Fingal)
- Stations: 3

Service
- Type: Heavy rail
- System: Coal
- Operator: TasRail

History
- Opened: 29 June, 1886
- Closed: Between Duncan Colliery to St Marys since 1988

Technical
- Line length: 52 or 53 km (32 or 33 mi)
- Track gauge: 3 ft 6 in (1,067 mm)

The Fingal Line is a 52 or 53 kilometre railway line in Tasmania, Australia, that runs from Conara Junction to Duncan Colliery near Fingal. To the present, the railway line is only used for colliery and is taken from a Wash plant near Fingal to Railton. There are a grand total of five Level crossings and several private Level crossings. The track goes over the Esk Highway three times and once on the Midland Highway but being the most dangerous Level crossing in Tasmania as the Railway line intersects on the Midland Highway at Conara.

== History ==
The railway line opened on 29 June, 1886 for Passengers, Sheep, Timber, General goods, Coal and other various uses. Since 1978, Passenger transport was defunted and was only used for Sheep, Timber, General goods, Coal and other various uses. In 1988, parts of railway line from Duncan Colliery to St Marys was stopped being used which ended 102 years of use from Fingal to St Marys, to the present, there are no little remainings of the railway line besides some left in gravel roads, the bridges for the defunt railway line still remain currently which can be seen when entering St Marys. Today, the railway line is only used for Colliery (coal) which comes from a Coal mine at Cornwall.

On 13 July 1886 at approximately 3:35pm, the company manager of the Fingal Line was killed when a ballast engine with a long string of trucks ran off the rails at the points on the Fingal side of the Avoca train station. It was supposed that the man slipped while jumping off the engine and the wheel of the truck passed over his head killing him instantly. Another man and his wife who were in an overturned truck were also injured. There were approximately 40 people on the train at the time but no one else was injured.

== See also ==
- Rail transport in Tasmania
