= St Marys Pass =

Section of road in the north-east of Tasmania

St Marys Pass Tasmania
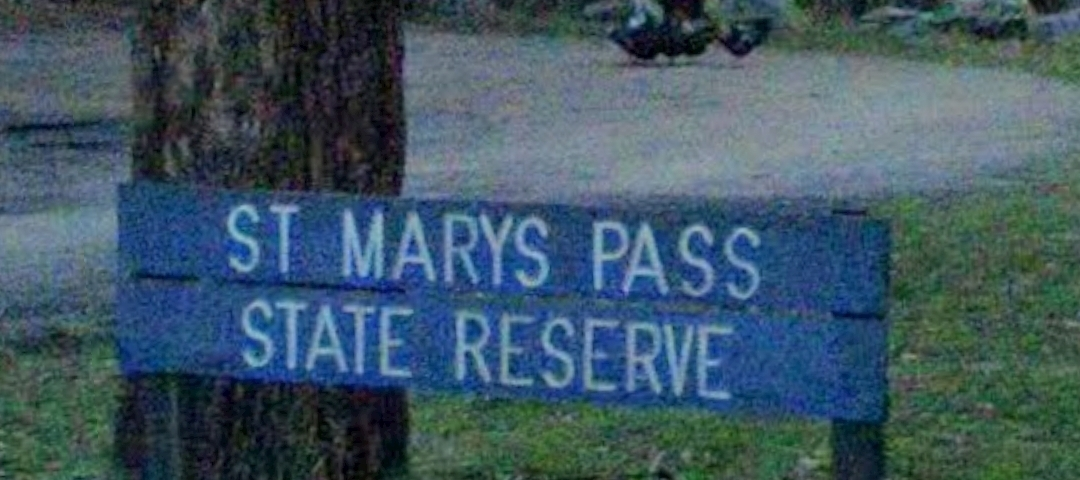
- The St Marys Pass State Reserve Sign when going to Falmouth
- Coordinates: 41.5252334°S 148.2424662°E (East end); 41.5587914°S 148.2078426°E (West end)

General information
- Type: Road
- Length: 6 km (3.7 mi)
- Route number(s): A4 Esk Highway; St Marys - Falmouth
- Former route number: A3 State Route 3 Tasman Highway

Major junctions
- East end: Tasman Highway
- West end: Main Street (St Marys)

Location(s)
- Region: North East and nearby the East Coast regions

St Marys Pass is a 6 km (3.7 mi) curvey road in Tasmania. The road has a hiking track when entering the pass. Convict labour built the trail built back in the 1840s. The road carries the Esk Highway, and serves traffic from St Marys to Falmouth and to the East Coast of Tasmania.

Route of St Marys Pass (Red Line)

In 2019, the Royal Automobile Club of Tasmania (or RACT) did a Member Survey and received 5500 responses. St Marys Pass (following up with the Esk Highway) were ranked as the Top 10 Worst Rated Roads in Tasmania.

== History ==
St Marys Pass was built by convict labour between 1843 and 1846. The road was built to connect traffic from the Fingal Valley to the East Coast. Around 300 convicts were stationed near the Grassy Bottom for the project. It serves as a historic, scenic route through the mountain.

The road serves traffic from the Fingal Valley to the East Coast with gravel roads connecting to the road and gullies on the side of St Patrick's Head Mountain.

Before 1991 the Tasman Highway went through St Marys Pass and out of Elephant Pass Road since there was no coastal route connected between Chain of Lagoons to Falmouth. On 2 December 1991 the bypass for St Marys opened to traffic. Care was taken during construction to protect the Aboriginal middens.

== Future of St Marys Pass ==
St Marys Pass experienced landslides and rockfalls throughout the previous years. Due to these landslides and rockfalls over the years, in 2024, the Tasmanian Government announced seven new routes to replace the existing road.

=== Planned routes ===
- Red Route - Upper Scamander
- Orange Route - Lower German Town Road Extension
- Blue Route - TasNetworks Powerline
- Yellow Route - Gillies Road Extension
- Green Route - Alternate Gillies Road Extension
- Purple Route - Maintain Existing Route plus Ten Year Upgrade
- Purple Route Two - Maintain Existing Route

=== Controversy ===
The new route to replace the already existing route of St Marys Pass is controversial due to it going to apparently cost A$2.7 Billion or A$3 Billion to reroute St Marys Pass which is more than the proposed Macquarie Point Stadium in Hobart which is approximately A$1 Billion or A$1.7 Billion.

== See also ==
- St Marys Pass State Reserve
- Elephant Pass Road
