= Esk Highway =

Highway in Tasmania, Australia

Esk Highway Tasmania

General information
- Type: Highway
- Length: 82 km (51 mi)
- Route number(s): A4; Conara — Falmouth
- Former route number: State Route 4

Major junctions
- West end: Midland Highway; Conara, Tasmania
- Storys Creek Road; Brown Street; Story Street
- East end: Tasman Highway; Falmouth, Tasmania

Location(s)
- Region: Midlands, North East and nearby the East Coast regions
- Major settlements: Avoca, Fingal, St Marys

Highway system
- Highways in Australia; National Highway • Freeways in Australia; Highways in Tasmania

The Esk Highway (also known as Esk Main Road) (route number A4) is a highway in Tasmania, Australia. It connects the Midland Highway, located down the centre of the state, with the Tasman Highway, which is located on the east coast of the state and in the Fingal Valley.

Its western end joins the Midland Highway at Conara Junction, just north of Campbell Town. Its eastern end passes through St Marys and then deviates to a north-east direction, where it connections to the Tasman Highway. Another road, which follows a path south-east of St Marys, joins another part of the Tasman Highway at Chain of Lagoons – although this is also marked as route A4, it is named Elephant Pass Road and is not part of the Esk Highway. The highway serves a short cut for traffic to the East Coast or the Northern Midlands.

== Route description ==
The highway branches off the Midland Highway (N1) near Conara. Most of the 3.6 km part of the road from the intersection of the highway is completely straight with hilly sections. The highway goes through curvey parts of road and then goes over the Fingal Line on a road bridge. Most of the highway branches off onto curvey, hilly parts of the road. The highway meets its first level crossing and town called Avoca but goes onto the St Pauls Bridge crossing the St Pauls River. After the bridge, it meets the intersection of Storys Creek Road (B42) and goes through the town centre of Avoca and meets the intersection of Royal George Road (C301). The highway then leaves the town and then goes through curvey and hilly sections. The highway meets its second level crossing and goes through curvey sections of the highway between the level crossing and Fingal, the highway meets its third level crossing near Ormley. It then meets its second town called Fingal after going through farmland. It goes through the town centre and meets the intersection for Mathinna Road (B43) and then keeps going through the town centre and then goes past the Duncan Colliery. About 20 km of highway goes through curvey and hilly sections again and then goes over the Break O'Day River, after crossing the Break O'Day river, a few kms ahead is the intersection of Mount Nicholas Road (C430) and meets the intersection for Cornwall. It goes through bushes until it meets its third town called St Marys, it then goes through the town centre meeting the intersection of Elephant Pass Road (A4) near the St Marys Hotel. It keeps going through the town centre and then leaves onto bushes and then enters the most curvey part of the highway called St Marys Pass which is 6 km long. It finishes St Marys Pass and then ends near Falmouth on the Tasman Highway (A3).

== Upgrades ==
The Esk Highway didn't revive any types of major upgrades until 2003 when roadworks were sited at Killymoon Bridge. The Esk Highway wasn't fully widened until 2022.

== Major intersections ==
| LGA | Location | km | mi | Destinations | Notes |
|---|---|---|---|---|---|
| Northern Midlands | Conara | 0 | 0.0 | Midland Highway (National Highway 1) – northwest – Launceston / southeast – Hobart | Western end of Esk Highway |
| St Pauls River | | 24.3 | 15.1 | St Pauls River Bridge | |
| Northern Midlands | Avoca | 24.4 | 15.2 | Storys Creek Road (B42) – northwest – Fingal | |
| Northern Midlands | Avoca | 24.7 | 15.3 | Royal George Road (C301) – southeast – Cranbrook | |
| Break O'Day | Fingal | 52.3 | 32.5 | Brown Street, to Mathinna Road (B43) – north – Mathinna | |
| Break O'Day River | | 61.1 | 38.0 | Killymoon Bridge | |
| Break O'Day | St Marys | 72.5 | 45.0 | Story Street, to Elephant Pass Road (A4) – south – Chain of Lagoons | |
| Break O'Day | Falmouth | 82.0 | 51.0 | Tasman Highway (A3) – north – St Helens / northeast, then south – Chain of Lagoons | Eastern end of Esk Highway |
1.000 mi = 1.609 km; 1.000 km = 0.621 mi

== See also ==
- Highways in Australia
- List of highways in Tasmania
- St Marys Pass
- Elephant Pass
