= Tasman Highway =

Highway in Tasmania, Australia

Tasman Highway Tasmania
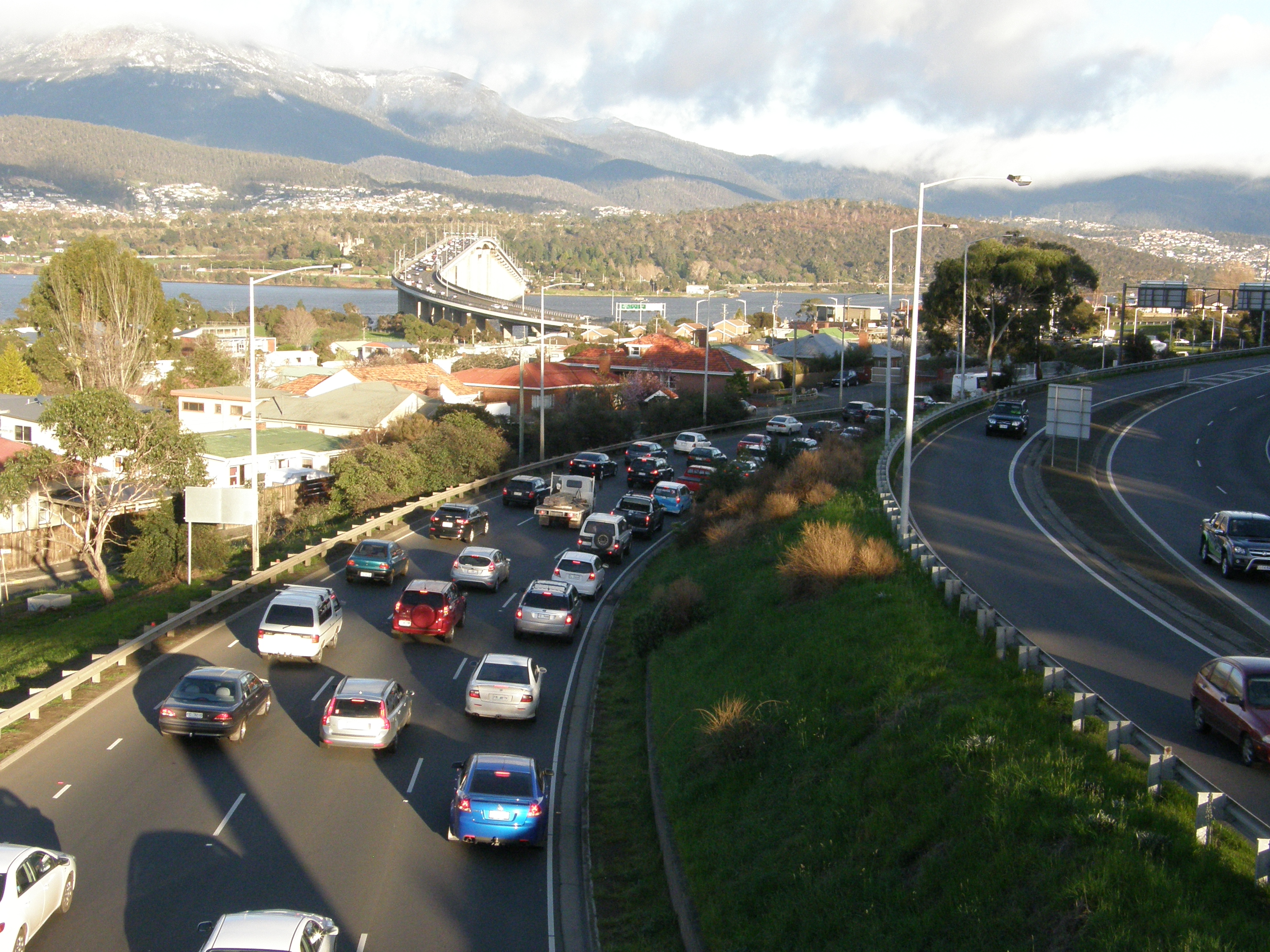
- The Tasman Highway at Montagu Bay, with the Tasman Bridge and Mount Wellington visible in the background
- Coordinates: 42.8788284°S 147.3345747°E (SW end); 41.4376229°S 147.1772370°E (NE end)

General information
- Type: Highway
- Length: 410 km (255 mi)
- Route number(s): A3; Hobart – Launceston
- Former route number: State Route 3

Major junctions
- SW end: Brooker Avenue; Macquarie Street; Davey Street; Hobart, Tasmania
- Domain Highway; East Derwent Highway; South Arm Highway; Cambridge Road; Arthur Highway; Lake Leake Highway; Elephant Pass Road; Esk Highway; Gladstone Road; George Street
- NE end: St Leonards Road; St Leonards Road; St Leonards, Launceston, Tasmania

Location(s)
- Region: Tasmania
- Major settlements: Rosny, Sorell, Orford, St Helens, Scottsdale

Highway system
- Highways in Australia; National Highway • Freeways in Australia; Highways in Tasmania

The Tasman Highway (or A3) is a highway in Tasmania, Australia. Just like the Midland Highway, it connects the major cities of Hobart and Launceston, however it takes a different route, via the north-eastern and eastern coasts of the state. The Highway also acts as a major commuter road to Hobart residents living on the eastern side of the River Derwent. The designation "Tasman Highway" arises from its location facing the Tasman Sea – named, like the state itself, after Abel Tasman. The highway is one of the longest in Tasmania – 410 km (250 mi), with an average travelling time of 4 1/2 hours.

== Eastern Outlet ==
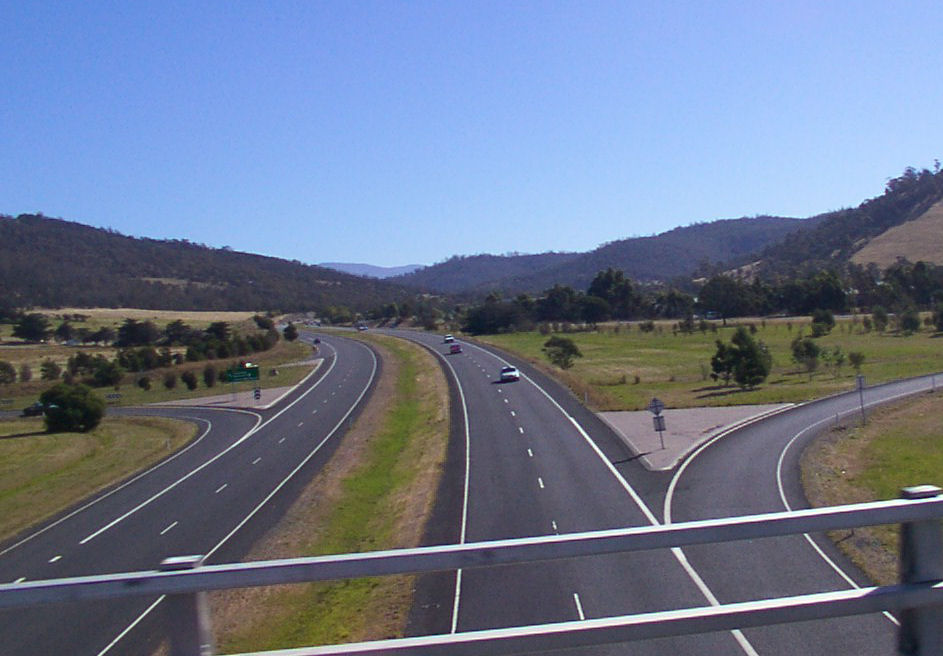
The Tasman Highway at Cambridge

The Eastern Outlet is a 24 km (15 mi) section of the Tasman Highway between Hobart and Sorell. As one of the city's 3 major radial highways, the outlet connects traffic from the Hobart city centre with Hobart Airport and commuters on the eastern shore of the River Derwent as well as intrastate traffic on the east coast and Tasman Peninsula. With recorded Annual average daily traffic of 67,000, the Tasman Bridge is the busiest portion of the Eastern Outlet and the Tasman Highway as a whole.

=== History ===
In 1964, a comprehensive transport study of Hobart was undertaken, calling for the construction of a freeway to serve Hobart's growing eastern suburbs. Prior to opening of the Tasman Bridge in 1964 traffic travelling between Hobart and the airport had to make use of the Hobart Bridge as well as Rosny Hill Road and Cambridge Road. Passing through the Meehan Range, this route was windy and entirely two-lane featuring at-grade intersections. The first section of the new Highway between Rosny Hill Road and Mornington opened in 1974 as it exists today and continued to the airport as three lanes in its current alignment. During the 1990s, the section of highway between Mornington and the airport was fully duplicated with funds from the Federal Government. In 2002, the Pitt Water bridge was replaced with a new bridge built beside the existing structure with the causeway widened. In 2012, Department of Infrastructure, Energy and Resources progressively installed variable speed limit signage between the airport and Hobart, citing the increased crashed rate on the road due to traffic and weather on the Meehan Range.

In 2022 the roundabout at Hobart Airport was replaced by a 5-way peanut-roundabout diamond intersection, allowing traffic on the Tasman Highway to flow over the intersection. The first stage of the Sorell Bypass was opened the same year, allowing traffic using the Arthur Highway to directly bypass Sorell instead of using Tasman Highway or Parsonage Place (to which was applied a 5-tonne limit, but the junction was earlier made into a roundabout). There is a reserve for Tasman Highway to bypass Sorell, going directly north at the current bypass towards William Street, but currently the traffic must use the old Arthur Highway intersection to exit Sorell.

=== Future ===
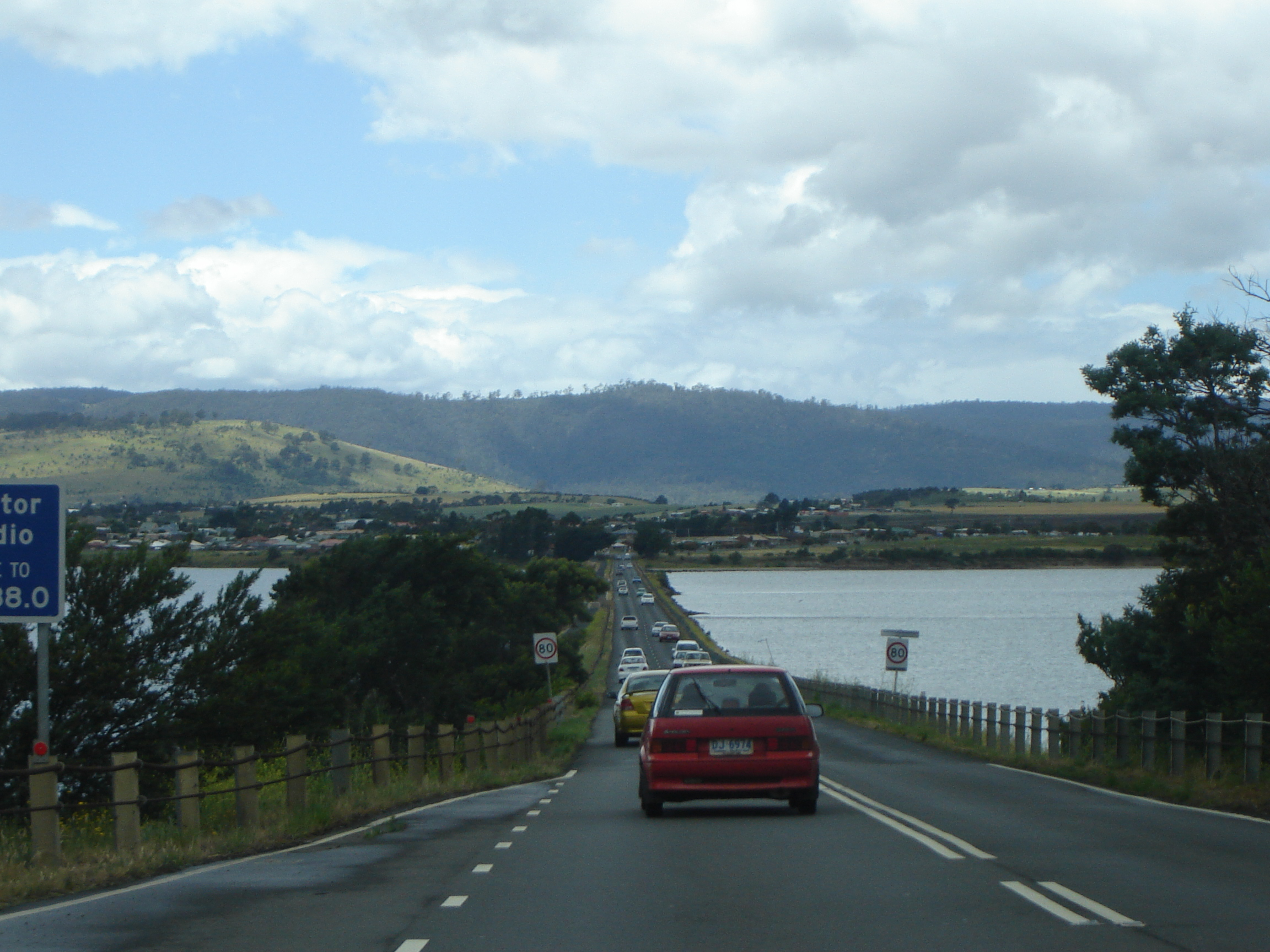
Tasman Highway at Midway Point

The Department of Infrastructure, Energy & Resources has outlined several concepts for the upgrading of the Eastern Outlet portion of the Tasman Highway – Both short and long term. These include;

- An upgrade of the highway at Montagu Bay, involving the addition of extra lanes and On/Off ramps between the East Derwent Highway and Rosny Hill Road, to provide safer passage of traffic travelling between these two Roads
- The upgrading of the Holyman Avenue Roundabout into the airport at Cambridge.
- The addition of On/Off Ramps at Gordons Hill Road at Rosny.
- The State government recently purchased land at Cambridge on the northern boundary of Hobart Airport to facilitate the future duplication of the Tasman Highway to Sorell. Possible second bypass of Sorell.

Additionally, independent bodies and proponents of the Highway have also made proposals of their own, including:

- Building the Highway to limited access, dual carriageway standard between the Airport and Sorell.
- Capacity upgrades between the Hobart city centre and the Mornington interchange.

=== Route ===
The southern section of the Highway commences on the fringe of the Hobart Central Business District at the intersection with the Brooker Highway and the Davey/Macquarie couplet. Featuring between four and five lanes of traffic and utilizing a lane management system for peak hour traffic, the highway travels north along the western shore of the River Derwent, intersecting with the Domain Highway before preceding over the Tasman Bridge. On the eastern side of the Bridge there are two interchanges in close proximity; the East Derwent Highway intersects the highway immediately after the bridge via the Lindisfarne Interchange and within 500 metres there is an interchange connecting Rosny Hill Road. From Rosny Hill Road the Tasman Highway continues east as a fully grade separated, Limited access highway intersecting with the South Arm Highway at Mornington and concluding after the airport diamond interchange (formerly a complete roundabout). For the remaining 4 km (2.5 mi) from the Airport the highway features 2 lanes of traffic, and travels over McGees Bridge and the Sorell Causeway to Sorell.

== Sorell to St Helens ==
The road to Orford remains at the national standard as a two-lane highway, albeit with only a few overtaking lanes along its distance. The remainder of the road to St Helens is two lane, with even fewer overtaking opportunities. In places, the eastern coastal portion of the highway runs just metres from the Tasman Sea, making it the easternmost A road in Tasmania.

The Tasman Highway is marketed as "East Coast Escape" between St Helens and Orford, to fit in with Tasmania's scheme of introducing tourist trails, a way of simplifying navigation of key tourist locations in Tasmania.

Prior to 1990, there was no coastal route between Falmouth and the Chain of Lagoons – one had to travel into and out of St Marys, both roads being steep grades. The bypass was officially opened on 2 December 1991, though motorists had been using the partially constructed road before its opening. Great care was taken during the construction to protect Aboriginal middens and the general environment.

In 2025, roadworks began between the Coles Bay Road intersection and Bicheno, constructing new overtaking lanes and improving road conditions.

== St Helens to Launceston ==
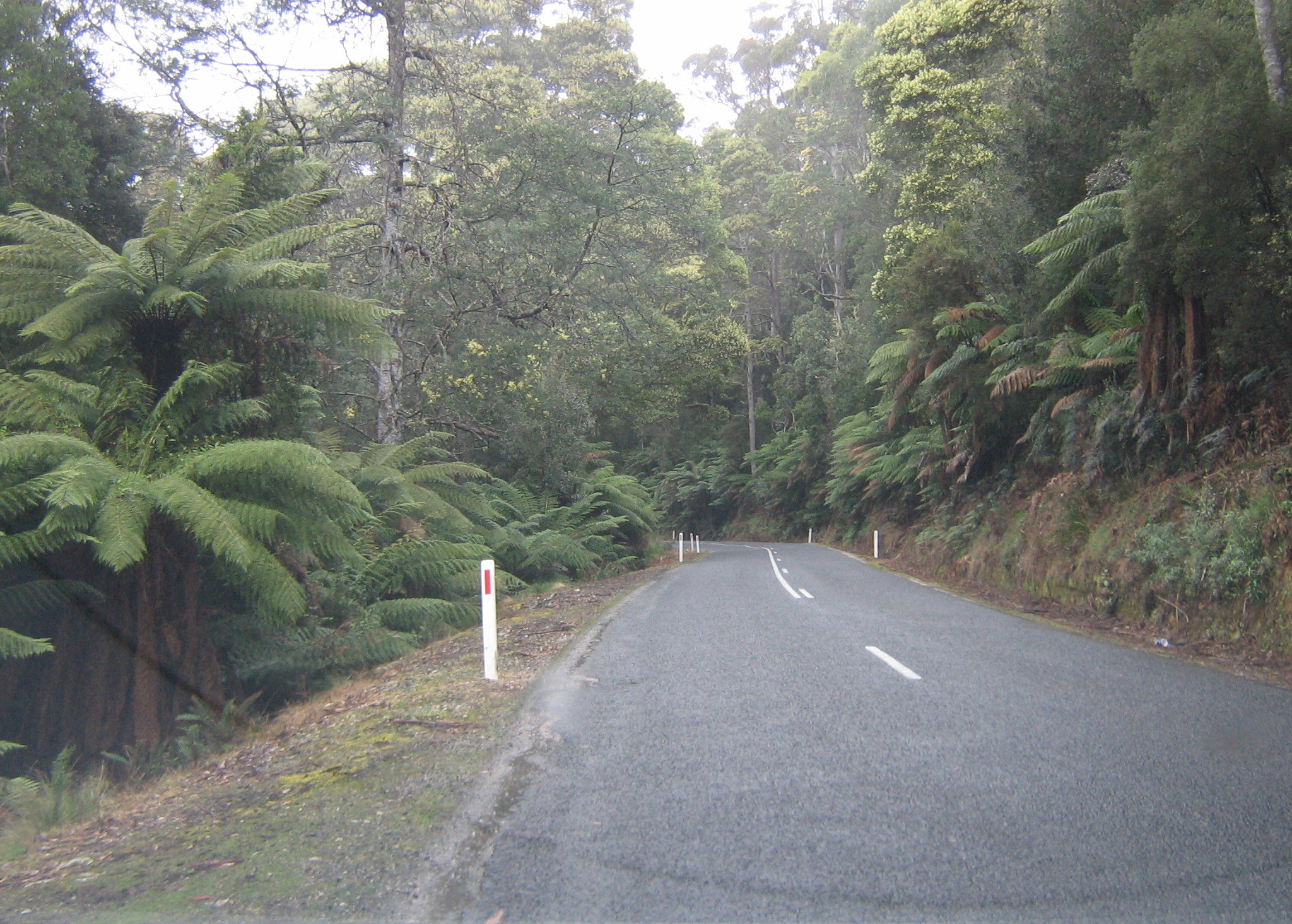
Tasman Highway between Scottsdale and St Helens

At the Launceston end, the highway is a main road with traffic lights. Out of the city, it becomes an ordinary two-lane road through the mountains. It passes waterfalls and through timber and rainforest country.

The portion between Launceston and Scottsdale runs through the Sideling Range. There is a lookout that offers views of Scottsdale and its surrounds.

The highway also passes through several former mining towns.

In 2023, roadwork began between the Sideling Lookout and Springfield, widening parts of the curved sections of highway and adding stopping bays along the curved parts of the highway.

== Route ==
The highway passes through the following localities:

- Hobart
- Suburbs the Highway passes out of Hobart
  - Rose Bay
  - Rosny
  - Warrane
  - Mornington
  - Cambridge
  - Midway Point
- Sorell
- Orielton
- Runnymede
- Buckland
- Orford
- Swansea
- (Freycinet National Park)
- Bicheno
- (St Marys)
- Scamander
- St Helens
- Scottsdale
- St Leonards and other Launceston suburbs
- Launceston

== Major intersections ==
LGA	Location	km	mi	Destinations	Notes
Hobart	Hobart	0	0.0	Brooker Highway (National Highway 1) west / Davey Street & Macquarie Street one-way couplet (A6) south - Huonville. Sandy Bay	Southern highway terminus; no access from Tasman Highway to Brooker Highway; traffic light intersection
Hobart	Hobart–Queens Domain boundary	0.24	0.15	Liverpool Street to Brooker Highway (National Highway 1) – Hobart central business district, North Hobart	No access from Liverpool Street to Tasman Highway southbound; traffic light intersection
Hobart	Queens Domain	1.5	0.93	Domain Highway – Glenorchy	Semi-directional T interchange
River Derwent		1.5– 2.9	0.93– 1.8	Tasman Bridge	
Clarence	Montagu Bay–Rose Bay boundary	3.2	2.0	East Derwent Highway (B32) – Lindisfarne	Directional T interchange
Clarence	Montagu Bay–Rose Bay–Lindisfarne–Rosny Park quadripoint	3.9	2.4	Rosny Park Road south - Rosny Park, Bellerive	Partial directional T interchange: no northbound to eastbound ramp
Clarence	Warrane–Mornington boundary	6.6	4.1	South Arm Highway (B33) south / Flagstaff Gully Link north - Mornington, Warrane, Rokeby, Flagstaff Gully	Interchange with eastbound exit via loop ramp
Clarence	Cambridge	9.7	6.0	Cambridge Road (B31 north / C329 south) / Belbins Road west - Cambridge, Richmond, Mount Rumney. Rokeby	Northbound exit and southbound entry only
Clarence	Cambridge	13.0	8.1	Acton Road south-east (C330) / Alliance Drive southwest / Cambridge Road north-west (to B31) / Kennedy Drive northeast – Cambridge, Richmond, Seven Mile Beach	Folded diamond interchange with ramp termini at roundabouts
Clarence	Cambridge	15.7	9.8	Holyman Avenue southeast / Kennedy Drive northwest – Hobart Airport, Cambridge Park	Dogbone interchange, replaced a roundabout
Sorell	Midway Point	20.6	12.8	Penna Road - Midway Point	Signalised intersection, replaced a roundabout
Sorell	Sorell	23.2	14.4	Arthur Highway (A9) – Dunalley, Port Arthur	Roundabout
Sorell	Sorell	24.5	15.2	Arthur Highway (old/Cole Street) (A9), Station Lane – Dunalley, Port Arthur	Traffic light intersection; dogleg onto Station Lane, northbound traffic turns west; southbound traffic turns south (both one turning lane); old northern terminus of Arthur Highway
Sorell	Sorell–Penna boundary	27.4	17.0	Brinktop Road (C351) – Richmond	
Clarence–Sorell boundary	Orielton	34.1	21.2	Fingerpost Road (C350) – Campania, Richmond	
Southern Midlands	Runnymede	43.7	27.2	Woodsdale Road (C312) – Levedale, Oatlands	
Glamorgan Spring Bay	Buckland	60.2	37.4	Buckland Road (C318) north – Woodsdale, Whiteford	
Glamorgan Spring Bay	Buckland	61.0	37.9	Nugent Road (C335) south – Nugent	
Glamorgan Spring Bay	Orford	76.3	47.4	Charles Street (C320) south / Esplanade east - Rheban	
Glamorgan Spring Bay	Triabunna	85.1	52.9	Freestone Point Road (C319)	
Glamorgan Spring Bay	Swansea	143	89	Lake Leake Road (B34) - Lake Leake, Campbell Town	
Glamorgan Spring Bay	Cranbrook	149	93	Old Coach Road (C301) – Royal George, Avoca	
Glamorgan Spring Bay	Bicheno	165	103	Coles Bay Road (C302) – Coles Bay, Freycinet National Park	
Break O'Day	Chain of Lagoons	204	127	Elephant Pass Road (A4) – St Marys, Launceston	
Break O'Day	Falmouth	226	140	Esk Highway (A4) south – St Marys, Launceston	T junction: northbound traffic turns north; southbound traffic turns east
Break O'Day	Scamander	232	144	Upper Scamander Road (C421) – Upper Scamander Road, Trout Creek Reserve	
Break O'Day	St Helens	249	155	St Helens Point Road (C851) – Stieglitz, Akaroa, St Helens Point Conservation Area	
Break O'Day	St Helens	253	157	Quail Street (C850 east) - Binalong Bay	
Break O'Day	St Helens	255	158	Ansons Bay Road (C843) - Priory. Ansons Bay, Mount William National Park	
Break O'Day	Goshen–Goulds Country boundary	270	170	Lottah Road (C841) - Goulds Country, The Blue Tier Forest Reserve	
Break O'Day	Pyengana	278	173	St Columba Falls Road (C428) - Pyengana, St Columba Falls State Reserve	
Break O'Day	Weldborough	297	185	Mount Paris Dam Road (C425) – Mount Paris Dam	
Dorset	Herrick	308	191	Gladstone Road (B82) – Pioneer, Gladstone	
Dorset	Winnaleah	312	194	Winnaleah Road (C840) - Winnaleah, Banca	
Dorset	Winnaleah	313	194	Derby Back Road (C837) west	
Dorset	Derby–Branxholm boundary	322	200	Derby Back Road (C837) north	
Dorset	Branxholm	324	201	Mount Paris Dam Road (C425) – Mount Paris Dam	
Dorset	Branxholm	326	203	Stokes Street (C835) - Warrentinna	
Dorset	Branxholm–Legerwood boundary	327	203	Legerwood Lane (C424)	
Dorset	Legerwood	330	210	Carisbrook Lane (C423) - Legerwood, Ringarooma. Mathinna	
Dorset	Tonganah	339	211	Jensens Road (C831)	
Dorset	Scottsdale	347	216	Ten Mile Track (C407)	
Dorset	Scottsdale	350	220	George Street (B84) northwest / Union Street northeast – Bridport, Lilydale	
Dorset	Scottsdale	351	218	William Street (B81) – Lilydale	
Dorset	Scottsdale	354	220	Sledge Track (C830) west - West Scottsdale	
Dorset	Springfield	358	222	South Springfield Road (C406) - South Springfield	
Dorset	Springfield	361	224	Upper Brid Road (C407)	
Dorset	Springfield	362	225	Sledge Track (C830) north - West Scottsdale	
Launceston	Targa	380	240	Camden Hill Road (C405)	
Launceston	Targa	381	237	Targa Hill Road (C828)	
Launceston	Nunamara	384	239	Pecks Hill Road (C829) – Patersonia	
Launceston	Nunamara	385	239	Mount Barrow Road (C404) – Mount Barrow State Reserve	
Launceston	Nunamara	384	239	Patersonia Road (C827) – Patersonia	
Launceston	St Leonards	405	252	Abels Hill Road (C403 southwest) – St Leonards	
Launceston	Waverley–St Leonards boundary	409	254	St Leonards Road (A3 north / C401 south) – Launceston, St Leonards	Northern highway terminus; roundabout
1.000 mi = 1.609 km; 1.000 km = 0.621 mi: Incomplete access

== See also ==
- Highways in Australia
- List of highways in Tasmania
- List of bypasses in Tasmania
