= Four Mile Creek, Tasmania =

Four Mile Creek
- Town
- Coordinates: 41°34′38″S 148°16′43″E
- Country: Australia
- State: Tasmania
- Region: North-east
- LGA: Break O'Day
- Location: 38 km (24 mi) S of St Helens

Government
  - State electorate: Lyons
  - Federal division: Lyons

Population
  - Total: 96 (2016 census)
- Postcode: 7215
Localities around Four Mile Creek
Falmouth	Falmouth	Tasman Sea
St Marys	Four Mile Creek	Tasman Sea
Gray	Chain of Lagoons	Tasman Sea

Four Mile Creek is a rural locality in the local government area (LGA) of Break O'Day in the North-east LGA region of Tasmania. The locality is about 38 kilometres (24 mi) south of the town of St Helens. The 2016 census recorded a population of 96 for the state suburb of Four Mile Creek.

== History ==
Four Mile Creek is a confirmed locality.

It was so named because of the length of the stream that flows through the area.

== Geography ==
The waters of the Tasman Sea form the eastern boundary. Four Mile Creek (the watercourse) flows through from south-west to north-east.

== Road infrastructure ==
Route A3 (Tasman Highway) passes through from south-east to north-east, which provides access to Four Mile Creek Road, which goes into the centre of Four Mile Creek.
