= Conara, Tasmania =

Conara
- Town
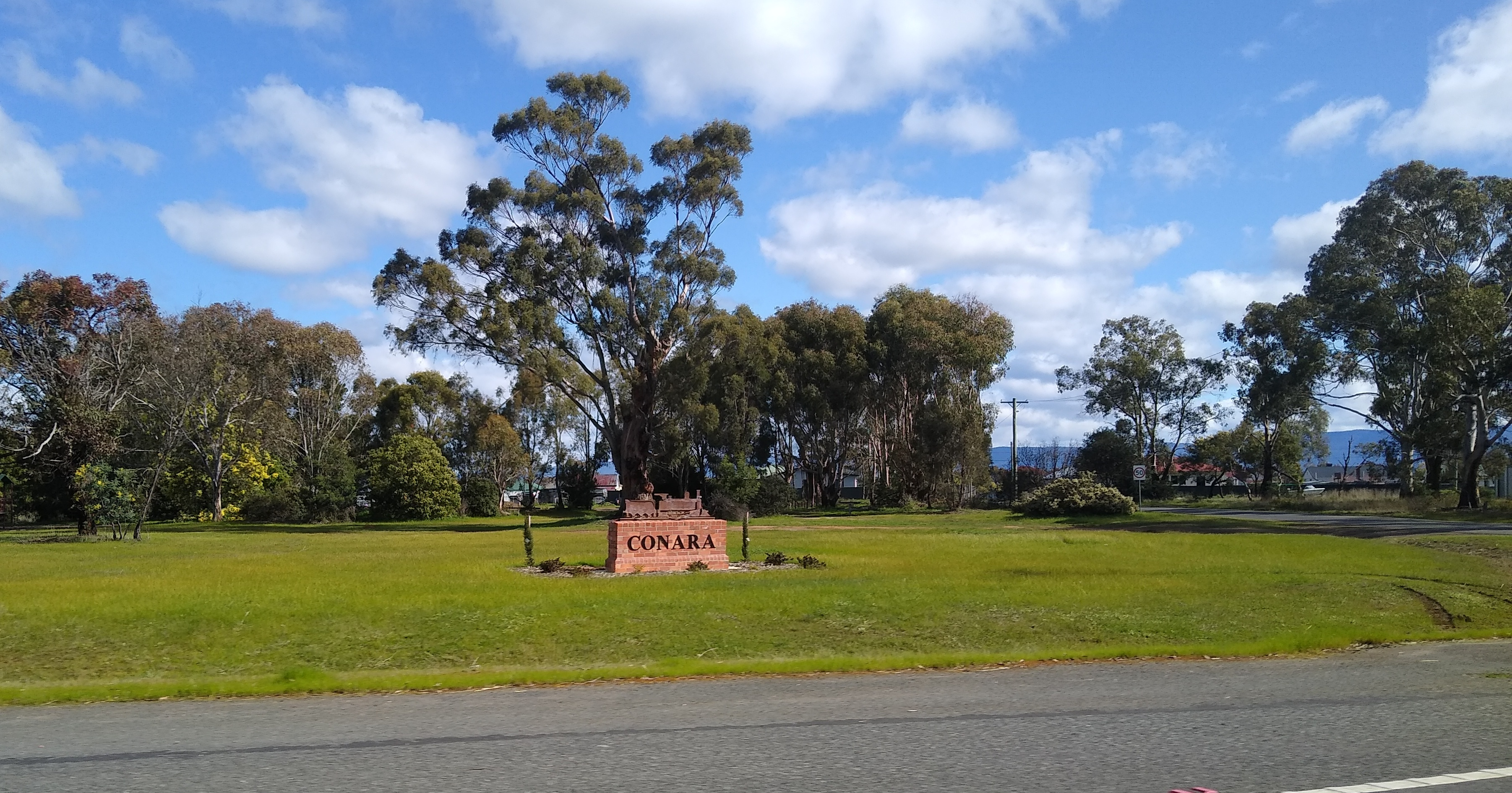

- Coordinates: 41°50′S 147°26′E
- Country: Australia
- State: Tasmania
- Region: Central
- LGA: Northern Midlands Council
- Location: 116 km (72 mi) N of Hobart; 51 km (32 mi) S of Launceston; 52 km (32 mi) NNE of Oatlands; 50 km (31 mi) SE of Longford

Government
  - State electorate: Lyons
  - Federal division: Lyons
- Elevation: 233 m (764 ft)

Population
  - Total: 127 (2021 census)
- Postcode: 7211
Localities around Conara
Nile	Deddington	Rossarden
Cleveland, Nile	Conara	Avoca
Campbell Town	Campbell Town	Campbell Town

Conara is a rural locality in the local government area (LGA) of Northern Midlands in the Central LGA region of Tasmania. The locality is about 50 kilometres (31 mi) south-east of the town of Longford. The 2016 census recorded a population of 127 for the state suburb of Conara.

== History ==
Conara was gazetted as a locality in 1972. The area was previously known by a number of names, including The Corner and Conara Junction. Conara is believed to be an Aboriginal word for "coal" or "charcoal".

=== Foundation ===
The founding of Conara originated in the early 1800s, from a land grant given to settlers James and Catherine Smith. At this time, the settlement was known as "Willis' Corner", or by the more contemporary and colloquially known "Humphrey’s Waterhole", until Smith was asked to establish an inn in 1850 to provide overnight hospitality to travellers on coach routes between Hobart and Launceston.

"The Corners Inn", built in 1850, gave its name to the future township, where it became known as "The Corners". This name would be recognised in part by the inn, but also that Conara was an important junction for the coach and rail networks in Tasmania. The inn itself became known to travellers as "The Disappearing House", due to the way of which the inn disappeared in front of a hill when viewed heading south. The town's post office, known as "Corners PO", opened on 12 August 1862, and was renamed to Conara Junction on 14 October 1887.

The original name of "The Corners" remained with the adjoining land until 1958 when then owner, Graeme Taylor, sold his 400 acres (less the separate title for the old Inn), to Alan McKinnon who absorbed it into his property Glen Esk on the banks of the South Esk River near Epping Forest.

When the railways arrived in Conara in the 1880s, the township became an important social hub in the Midlands region of Tasmania. The boom affected the township greatly, with housing, employment, a church opening in 1892, as well as a part-time school opening in 1891.

In 1903, the local school began full-time operation until it closed in 1974 due to low enrolment. The church is now disused and derelict, and the general store and shops have closed. The town's post office was renamed from Conara Junction to Conara on 1 January 1960, but the post office has since closed.

Today, with the heyday all but over, Conara still remains an important siding for trains, albeit diminished, as well as a destination between the two main cities. The town has one of the most unsafe level crossings in Tasmania, with the railway intersecting the Midland Highway.

=== Conara Junction ===
In 1872, the Tasmanian Main Line Railway Company surveyed and constructed their government-sponsored main railway line between Hobart and Launceston, which helped to expand the town. Due to mining interests on the East Coast of Tasmania, in 1886 the railway company constructed the Fingal Line. branching eastwards out of the town, through Avoca and Fingal to the Cornwall and Mt. Nicholas coal mines near St Marys. The township of Conara derives its name from the Aboriginal word for "coal", although the relevance of this name may be questioned as no coal bearing seams exist in its vicinity.

Seeing daily services from Hobart or Launceston, as well as freight workings on the Fingal line on the new Tasmanian Government Railways, Conara Junction developed into a railway town; becoming home to mostly railway employees, as well as recreation and housing provided by the Railways Institute.

With the removal of passenger services on the Fingal Line in the 1950s, and the subsequent investment in the highway system in Tasmania; the railways and their importance in Tasmania dwindled, and as a result Conara was affected. Railway workers, who made up most of the town's population, lost work and moved elsewhere, and with the transfer of the Tasmanian Government Railways to the Australian National Railways Commission in 1978, passenger operations ceased on the network and Conara lost most of its rail traffic.

A new freight rail yard was erected to the north of the heritage station in recent years, as well as the closure of the southern leg of the wye junction. The Fingal Line still carries coal trains to this day, mostly headed to Burnie. The railway station building and platform still remain, derelict but used for occasional Main Line crew changes. The Fingal Line platforms were demolished in the 1950s and very little traces remain.

== Geography ==
Most of the boundaries are survey lines. The South Esk River flows through from east to west before forming a small part of the western boundary. The Ben Lomond Rivulet, a tributary of the South Esk, forms part of the western boundary. The North-South Railway Line runs through the south-west corner.

== Road infrastructure ==
National Highway 1 (Midland Highway) semi bypasses and passes through from south-west to west, and the A4 road (Esk Highway) branches off to the east. This intersection is at the tripoint of road route zones 3, 4 and 5.
