= St Marys Pass State Reserve =

Protected area in the north-east of Tasmania

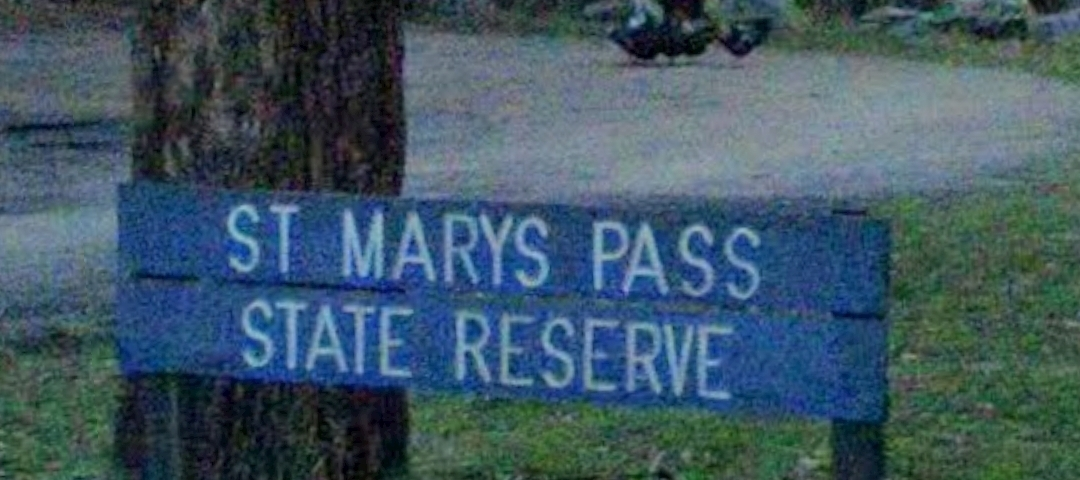
- Sign at the entrance of St Marys Pass

- Location within Tasmania
- Location: Tasmania
- Coordinates: 41°33′31.5″S 148°12′6″E
- Governing body: Tasmania Parks and Wildlife Service

St Marys Pass State Reserve is a state reserve located in the Fingal Valley, in the North-east of Tasmania, Australia.

Entrance to the State Reserve is from St Marys Pass, which is a section of road on the Esk Highway.

The State Reserve is mostly a bushwalk reserve, like St Patrick's Head State Reserve.
