= Elephant Pass Road =

Road in the North east of Tasmania

Elephant Pass Road Tasmania

General information
- Type: Road
- Length: 17 km (11 mi)
- Route number(s): A4 Elephant Pass Road St Marys - Chain of Lagoons
- Former route number: A3 State Route 3 Tasman Highway

Location(s)
- Major suburbs: Gray

Elephant Pass Road or better known as Elephant Pass is a 17 kilometre curvey road between St Marys to Chain of Lagoons, The road is similar to St Marys Pass but longer and narrower, and is popular with Motorists, and Targa racing.

The name for the Road comes from the shape of the Hills as Shaped as a Elephant lying down when viewed when Entering St Marys on the Esk Highway when leaving Fingal

Before 1991 the Tasman Highway went through Elephant Pass Road since there was no coastal route between Chain of Lagoons to Falmouth. When the bypass for St Marys was being built, Great care was taken during the construction to protect the Aboriginal middens. When driving on Elephant Pass Road, a view of the Ocean can be seen from a Curtain view. There has being multiple Tagra racing accidents on Elephant Pass Road as going off-road and other various Accidents.

== See also ==
- St Marys Pass
