= Upper Scamander =

- Town
- Coordinates: 41°26′46″S 148°11′20″E
- Country: Australia
- State: Tasmania
- Region: North-east
- LGA: Break O'Day
- Location: 28 km (17 mi) SW of St Helens

Government
  - State electorate: Lyons
  - Federal division: Lyons

Population
  - Total: 60 (SAL 2021)
- Postcode: 7215
Localities around Upper Scamander
St Helens	St Helens	St Helens
St Helens, Mathinna	Upper Scamander	Scamander, Falmouth, Beaumaris, St Helens
Mathinna	St Marys	Falmouth

Upper Scamander is a rural locality in the local government area (LGA) of Break O'Day in the North-east LGA region of Tasmania. The locality is about 28 kilometres (17 mi) south-west of the town of St Helens.

== History ==
Upper Scamander was gazetted as a locality in 1964. The district was originally known as Lolla, but the current name was in use by 1855.

It is believed that the name “Scamander” was given by Surveyor-General George Frankland (also known as George Franklin) who was a scholar with an interest in Greek culture.

The 2016 census recorded a population of 44 for the state suburb of Upper Scamander. At the 2021 census, the population had increased to 60.

== Geography ==
The Scamander River forms part of the western boundary before flowing through to the east, where it then forms part of the eastern boundary.

== Road infrastructure ==
Route C421 (Upper Scamander Road / Catos Road) enters from the east and runs north-west to the village, where it turns south-west and runs to the western boundary. From there it follows the western boundary to the south-west corner.

== See also ==
- Scamander, a river god in Greek mythology.
