= Douglas River, Tasmania =

Douglas River Tasmania
- Coordinates: 41°48′47″S 148°15′27″E
- Population: 30 (2016 census)
- Postcode(s): 7215
- Location: 67 km (42 mi) S of St Helens
- LGA(s): Break O'Day, Glamorgan–Spring Bay
- Region: North-east, South-east
- State electorate(s): Lyons
- Federal division(s): Lyons
Localities around Douglas River:
Douglas-Apsley	Seymour	Tasman Sea
Douglas-Apsley	Douglas River	Tasman Sea
Douglas-Apsley	Bicheno	Tasman Sea

Douglas River is a rural locality in the local government areas (LGA) of Break O'Day and Glamorgan–Spring Bay in the North-east and South-east LGA regions of Tasmania. The locality is about 67 kilometres (42 mi) south of the town of St Helens. The 2016 census recorded a population of 30 for the state suburb of Douglas River.

== History ==
Douglas River was gazetted as a locality in 1968. The name was in use by 1902. It is possibly derived from an 1830s Survey Department draughtsman named Henry Douglas.

It was originally a coal mining area.

== Geography ==
The waters of the Tasman Sea form the eastern boundary. Douglas River (the watercourse) flows through from west to east, where it empties into Maclean Bay, an inlet of the Tasman Sea.

== Road infrastructure ==
Route A3 (Tasman Highway) passes through from south to north.
