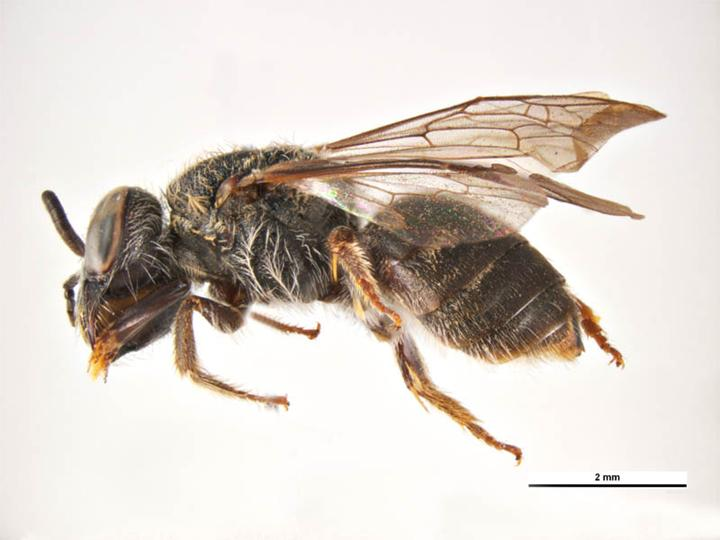
- Female
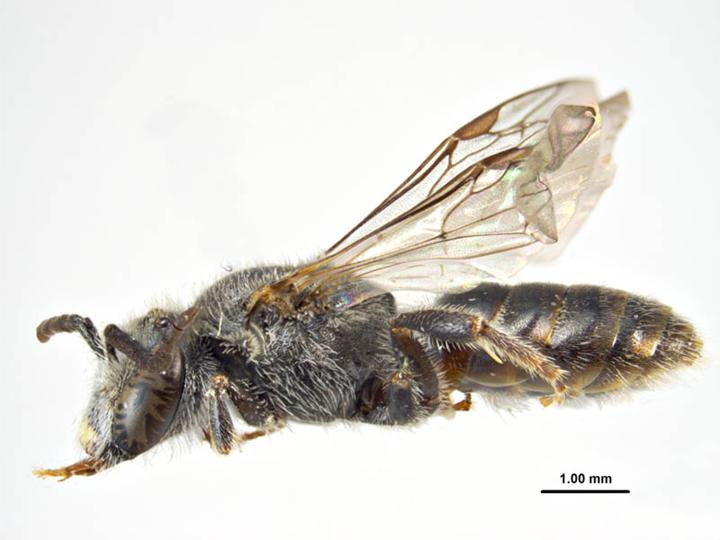
- Male

Scientific classification
- Kingdom: Animalia
- Phylum: Arthropoda
- Clade: Pancrustacea
- Class: Insecta
- Order: Hymenoptera
- Family: Halictidae
- Genus: Lasioglossum
- Species: L. asperithorax

Binomial name
- Lasioglossum asperithorax (Cockerell, 1910)

Synonyms
- Halictus asperithorax Cockerell, 1910; Halictus excusus Cockerell, 1930

= Lasioglossum asperithorax =

Species of bee

Lasioglossum asperithorax, or Lasioglossum (Chilalictus) asperithorax, is a species of bee in the family Halictidae and subfamily Halictinae. It is endemic to Australia. It was described by British-American entomologist Theodore Dru Alison Cockerell in 1910.

== Description ==
Female body length is about 8 mm. Integumental colouration is mainly black, with dark reddish markings.

== Distribution and habitat ==
The species occurs in south-eastern Australia. Type localities include Melbourne in Victoria and Pyengana in Tasmania.

== Behaviour ==
The adults are flying mellivores. They nest communally in soil and have sedentary larvae. Flowering plants visited by the bees include Daviesia, Pultenaea, Coreopsis, Gazania, Hypochaeris, Stylidium and Veronica species.
