= Avoca Primary School =

Former primary school in Avoca, Tasmania

Location
- Avoca; Tasmania; Australia; 41.7823968°S 147.7266727°E

Information
- Type: Primary school
- Established: 1952; 74 years ago
- Status: Closed
- Closed: 19 December 2019; 7 years ago
- Website: avocaprimary.education.tas.edu.au at the Wayback Machine (archived 17 October 2019)

The Avoca Primary School is a former primary school located in Avoca, Tasmania.

== History ==
The primary school was opened in 1952 after relocating from the original location which is now the Avoca Museum and Information Centre. The new primary school reopened on St Pauls Street which is a weather board building with a steel roof.

== Closure ==
The primary school had closed on 19 December, 2019 due to low student numbers, but actually had a closure threat in 2009 before the actual closure happened in 2019. At the time when the Avoca Primary School only had 35 students in 2009, the school had at least a closure threat due to the low student numbers. The state schools like Avoca Primary School had only a week to submit their proposals for federal infrastructure funding and the State Government has advised they would have a greater chance of success if they amalgamate. The school had a proposed closure in 2012, but didn't happen seven until years later which was in December 2019.
