= Stieglitz, Tasmania =

Stieglitz
- Town
- Coordinates: 41°19′47″S 148°18′15″E
- Country: Australia
- State: Tasmania
- Region: North-east
- LGA: Break O'Day
- Location: 8 km (5.0 mi) E of St Helens

Government
  - State electorate: Lyons
  - Federal division: Lyons

Population
  - Total: 561 (2016 census)
- Postcode: 7216
Localities around Stieglitz
Georges Bay	Akaroa	Tasman Sea
Georges Bay	Stieglitz	Tasman Sea
St Helens	St Helens	Tasman Sea

Stieglitz is a rural residential locality in the local government area (LGA) of Break O'Day in the North-east LGA region of Tasmania. The locality is about 8 kilometres (5.0 mi) east of the town of St Helens. The 2016 census recorded a population of 561 for the state suburb of Stieglitz.

== History ==
Stieglitz was gazetted as a locality in 1964. The name was in use by 1855.

The name comes from a pioneer family named von Stieglitz.

== Geography ==
The waters of the Tasman Sea form the eastern boundary, and Georges Bay the western. St Helens Airport is within the locality.

== Road infrastructure ==
Route C851 (St Helens Point Road) passes through from south-west to north-west.
