= Falmouth, Tasmania =

Falmouth
- Town
- Coordinates: 41°29′19″S 148°15′26″E
- Country: Australia
- State: Tasmania
- Region: North-east Tasmania
- LGA: Break O'Day
- Location: 14 km (8.7 mi) NE of St Marys

Government
  - State electorate: Lyons
  - Federal division: Lyons

Population
  - Total: 102 (2016 census)
- Postcode: 7215
Localities around Falmouth
Upper Scamander	Scamander	Henderson Lagoon
St Marys	Falmouth	Tasman Sea
St Marys Pass State Reserve	St Patricks Head State Reserve	Four Mile Creek

Falmouth is a locality and small rural community in the local government area of Break O'Day, in the North-east region of Tasmania. It is located about 14 kilometres (8.7 mi) north-east of the town of St Marys. The Tasman Sea forms most of its eastern boundary, with the remainder being the centre line of Henderson Lagoon. The 2016 census determined a population of 102 for the state suburb of Falmouth.

== History ==
The locality name is believed to be derived from Falmouth, a seaport in Cornwall, England.

== Road infrastructure ==
Falmouth Road goes through the town centre while the Tasman Highway passes through the boundary from south to north, and intersects with the Esk Highway within the locality.
