= Chain of Lagoons, Tasmania =

Chain of Lagoons
- Town
- Coordinates: 41°39′51″S 148°17′01″E
- Country: Australia
- State: Tasmania
- Region: North-east Tasmania
- LGA: Break O'Day
- Location: 17 km (11 mi) SE of St Marys

Government
  - State electorate: Lyons
  - Federal division: Lyons

Population
  - Total: 21 (2016 census)
- Postcode: 7215
Localities around Chain of Lagoons
St Marys	Four Mile Creek	Tasman Sea
Gray	Chain of Lagoons	Tasman Sea
Douglas-Apsley National Park	Seymour	Tasman Sea

Chain of Lagoons is a locality and small rural community in the local government area of Break O'Day, in the North-east region of Tasmania. It is located about 17 kilometres (11 mi) south-east of the town of St Marys. The Tasman Sea forms its eastern boundary. The 2016 census determined a population of 21 for the state suburb of Chain of Lagoons.

== History ==
The locality name is believed to be derived from the several lagoons in the vicinity.

== Road infrastructure ==
The Tasman Highway passes through from south to north, and intersects with the A4 route (Elephant Pass Road) within the locality.
