= Gray, Tasmania =

Gray
- Town
- Coordinates: 41°37′56″S 148°13′32″E
- Country: Australia
- State: Tasmania
- Region: North-east
- LGA: Break O'Day
- Location: 44 km (27 mi) S of St Helens

Government
  - State electorate: Lyons
  - Federal division: Lyons

Population
  - Total: 69 (2016 census)
- Postcode: 7216
Localities around Gray
St Marys	St Marys	Four Mile Creek
St Marys	Gray	Chain of Lagoons
St Marys	Douglas-Apsley	Chain of Lagoons

Gray is a rural locality in the local government area (LGA) of Break O'Day in the North-east LGA region of Tasmania. The locality is about 44 kilometres (27 mi) south of the town of St Helens. The 2016 census recorded a population of 69 for the state suburb of Gray.

== History ==
Gray was gazetted as a locality in 1968.

The area was previously known as Thompsons Marsh.

== Geography ==
The Break O’Day River forms part of the south-western boundary.

== Road infrastructure ==
Route A4 (Elephant Pass Road) passes through from north-west to east.
