= Rossarden =

Town in the Midlands region in Tasmania

- Town
- Coordinates: 41°40′S 147°45′E
- Country: Australia
- State: Tasmania
- Region: Central, North-east
- LGA: Northern Midlands Council (89%), Break O'Day Council (11%)
- Location: 81 km (50 mi) E of Longford

Government
  - State electorate: Lyons
  - Federal division: Lyons
- Elevation: 610 m (2,000 ft)

Population
  - Total: 48 (2021 census)
- Postcode: 7213
- Mean max temp: 14.8 °C (58.6 °F)
- Mean min temp: 4.5 °C (40.1 °F)
- Annual rainfall: 952.5 mm (37.50 in)
Localities around Rossarden
Ben Lomond	Ben Lomond	Mangana
Deddington	Rossarden	Fingal
Conara	Avoca	Fingal

Rossarden is a rural locality in the local government areas (LGA) of Northern Midlands (89%) and Break O'Day (11%) in the Central and North-east LGA regions of Tasmania. The locality is about 81 kilometres (50 mi) east of the town of Longford. The 2016 census recorded a population of 42 for the state suburb of Rossarden.

== Town description ==
The town is a small rural locality with only eight streets, and only two ways of entering which is Rossarden Road (B42) which is the only entrance, and exit from Avoca or Mangana. The town centre has almost nothing but houses, and a former pub which was called the Rossarden Club (Rossarden Club coordinates:41.6650048°S 147.7490263°E). There are massive tall gravel hills near the old tin mine.

== History ==
Rossarden was gazetted as a locality in 1973.

It is an old mining town in north-east Tasmania, located 19 km from Avoca and within sight of Ben Lomond.

The town came into being primarily as a result of the tin mining operations of Aberfoyle Tin Mining Company, N.L which created a demand for employees.

The town is located in a valley below Stacks Bluff (1527 m) and it is an old tin mining town, though the mine closed in 1982. Prior to this Rossarden was one of Australia's major tin producing towns. The main road into and out of the town is Rossarden Road.

At the 2006 census, Rossarden and the surrounding area had a population of 172. According to the 2011 census, this number had grown to 301 people.

In 2008 an irregularity in the deed paperwork belonging to the residents of Rossarden was discovered. It was discovered that each resident actually owned the house next door to their own. The irregularity has since been corrected by the State Government.

By 1933 the town was said to be growing steadily with a town hall, a post office, and 17 dwellings built in a matter of months, while a community ball was reported to have been arranged in order to raise funds for a tennis and badminton court. The post office opened on 20 November 1933.

Nearby locations include Storeys Creek, where there was a wolfram mine, Fingal and Avoca. The town's decline was captured in the Weddings Parties Anything song "Rossarden".

A book was written about the town in 2004 focusing on the stories of former residents. A second edition was published in 2022. There are also various books written about the mineralogy in the area.

In recent times there has been a campaign to draw tourists to the area.

In 2016 plans for a new base station that would better serve mobile telephone coverage in the Rossarden area were revealed.

== Geography ==
Almost all the boundaries are survey lines. Storys Creek, a tributary of the South Esk River, flows through from north to south.

== Road infrastructure ==
Route B42 (Rossarden Road) runs through from south to north-east, which is the only road that provides access to the town centre of Rossarden.
