= Mangana, Tasmania =

Mangana
- Town
- Coordinates: 41°36′28″S 147°53′06″E
- Country: Australia
- State: Tasmania
- Region: North-east
- LGA: Break O'Day
- Location: 74 km (46 mi) SW of St Helens

Government
  - State electorate: Lyons
  - Federal division: Lyons

Population
  - Total: 38 (2021 census)
- Postcode: 7214
Localities around Mangana
Mathinna	Mathinna	Mathinna
Ben Lomond	Mangana	Fingal
Rossarden	Fingal	Fingal

Mangana is a rural locality in the local government area (LGA) of Break O'Day in the North-east LGA region of Tasmania. The locality is about 74 kilometres (46 mi) south-west of the town of St Helens. The 2016 census recorded a population of 36 for the state suburb of Mangana.

== History ==
Mangana was gazetted as a locality in 1973. The name was in use by 1877.

Gold was discovered in the area in 1852. It was named for an Aboriginal who was the father of Truganini.

== Geography ==
The boundaries of the locality are a combination of ridgelines and survey lines.

== Road infrastructure ==
Route B42 (Mangana Road / Rossarden Road) enters from the south-east, runs north-west to the village, then south-west to the southern boundary. From there it follows the southern boundary to the south-west corner. Route C429 (Tower Hill Road) runs north along the eastern boundary before passing through the north-east corner.
