= Scamander, Tasmania =

Town in Tasmania, Australia

Scamander
- Town
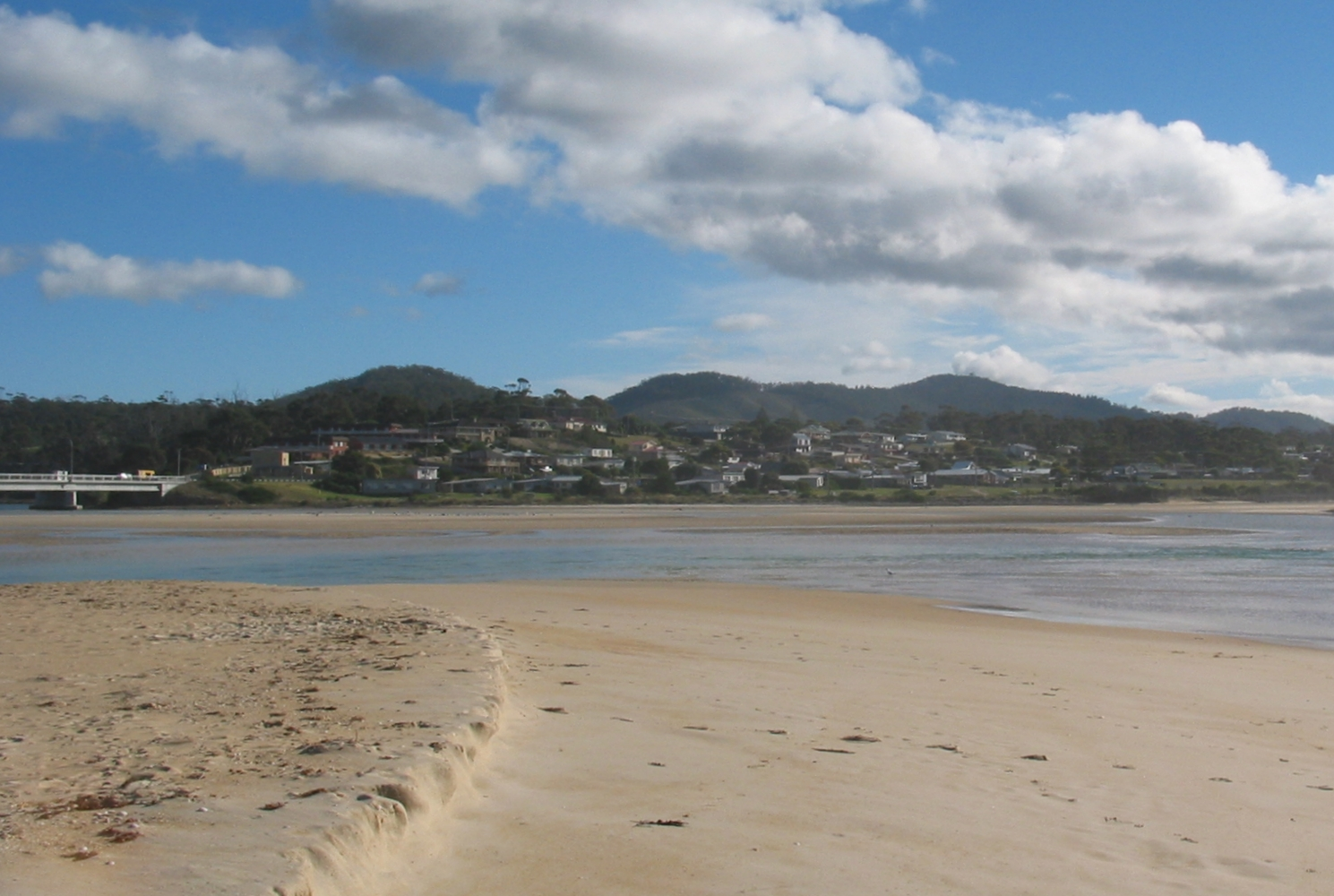

- Coordinates: 41°27′S 148°16′E
- Country: Australia
- State: Tasmania
- LGA: Break O'Day Council
- Location: 18 km (11 mi) from St Marys; 18 km (11 mi) from St Helens; 146 km (91 mi) from Launceston; 235 km (146 mi) from Hobart

Government
  - State electorate: Lyons
  - Federal division: Lyons
- Elevation: 3 m (9.8 ft)

Population
  - Total: 803 (2021 census)
- Postcode: 7215
- Mean max temp: 18.0 °C (64.4 °F)
- Mean min temp: 8.9 °C (48.0 °F)
- Annual rainfall: 699.9 mm (27.56 in)

Scamander is a small town at the mouth of the Scamander River between St Helens and St Marys on the north-east coast of Tasmania in Australia. The town is a popular holiday destination because of its wide, sandy beaches and views of the ocean. Recreational activities include surfing, swimming and fishing for bream in the river.

== History ==
The first European to travel through the area was surveyor John Helder Wedge in 1825. He named the river "Borthwick" and the position itself he named "Yarmouth" after the English port Great Yarmouth but both the river and town were both later renamed "Scamander".

The wide river mouth has been a challenge to bridge builders for many years. Richard Terry constructed a timber bridge in 1865, but it collapsed around May in 1875 while a large herd of cattle was being driven across it. A second and third bridge were successively washed away in floods in 1889 and 1911. Further bridges succumbed to flood and shipworms, the last timber bridge collapsing in 1929. A truss bridge was built in 1936 but was demolished in 2021 due to it being unsafe which was once used by pedestrians and bicycles. The concrete bridge that currently carries the Tasman Highway was built on a better alignment nearby and officially opened on 26 June 1991.

Scamander Post Office opened on 1 October 1896 and closed in 1933. It reopened in 1950.

On the evening of 11 December 2006, 18 houses and a restaurant were razed by a bushfire that swept around the small town.

== Climate ==
Scamander has a temperate oceanic climate (Köppen: Cfb); experiencing mild summers and cool winters. Average maxima vary from 22.1 °C (71.8 °F) in February to 13.8 °C (56.8 °F) in July, while average minima range between 13.0 °C (55.4 °F) in February and 4.5 °C (40.1 °F) in July. Precipitation is moderate, averaging 699.9 mm (27.56 in) per annum. Rainfall is well-distributed through the year; occurring on 126.8 days. The town is not particularly sunny, experiencing 130.0 cloudy days and 74.3 clear days per annum. Extreme temperatures have ranged from 42.2 °C (108.0 °F) on 30 January 2009 to −3.0 °C (26.6 °F) on 6 July 1990. The former reading is also Tasmania's highest recorded temperature.

Climate data for Scamander (41.46°S 148.26°E, elev. 3 m) (1974–2013)
Month	Jan	Feb	Mar	Apr	May	Jun	Jul	Aug	Sep	Oct	Nov	Dec	Year
Record high °C (°F)	42.2 (108.0)	39.8 (103.6)	34.8 (94.6)	29.3 (84.7)	24.7 (76.5)	20.1 (68.2)	21.8 (71.2)	24.9 (76.8)	29.7 (85.5)	31.7 (89.1)	34.7 (94.5)	35.6 (96.1)	42.2 (108.0)
Mean maximum °C (°F)	32.9 (91.2)	31.5 (88.7)	28.9 (84.0)	25.5 (77.9)	21.4 (70.5)	18.1 (64.6)	17.6 (63.7)	19.3 (66.7)	22.3 (72.1)	25.3 (77.5)	28.7 (83.7)	28.7 (83.7)	34.8 (94.6)
Mean daily maximum °C (°F)	22.1 (71.8)	21.7 (71.1)	20.7 (69.3)	18.8 (65.8)	16.6 (61.9)	14.4 (57.9)	13.8 (56.8)	14.8 (58.6)	16.3 (61.3)	17.4 (63.3)	19.0 (66.2)	20.3 (68.5)	18.0 (64.4)
Daily mean °C (°F)	17.4 (63.3)	17.4 (63.3)	16.3 (61.3)	14.3 (57.7)	12.1 (53.8)	10.0 (50.0)	9.2 (48.6)	10.0 (50.0)	11.5 (52.7)	12.7 (54.9)	14.7 (58.5)	15.8 (60.4)	13.4 (56.2)
Mean daily minimum °C (°F)	12.7 (54.9)	13.0 (55.4)	11.8 (53.2)	9.8 (49.6)	7.5 (45.5)	5.5 (41.9)	4.5 (40.1)	5.2 (41.4)	6.6 (43.9)	8.0 (46.4)	10.3 (50.5)	11.3 (52.3)	8.9 (47.9)
Mean minimum °C (°F)	7.6 (45.7)	7.7 (45.9)	6.1 (43.0)	4.2 (39.6)	2.4 (36.3)	0.9 (33.6)	0.4 (32.7)	0.9 (33.6)	1.6 (34.9)	2.8 (37.0)	5.1 (41.2)	6.4 (43.5)	−0.3 (31.5)
Record low °C (°F)	5.1 (41.2)	5.3 (41.5)	2.6 (36.7)	2.0 (35.6)	0.0 (32.0)	−2.2 (28.0)	−3.0 (26.6)	−1.2 (29.8)	−0.2 (31.6)	0.1 (32.2)	1.8 (35.2)	3.8 (38.8)	−3.0 (26.6)
Average precipitation mm (inches)	55.2 (2.17)	45.3 (1.78)	65.7 (2.59)	69.0 (2.72)	53.9 (2.12)	54.0 (2.13)	54.2 (2.13)	63.4 (2.50)	54.7 (2.15)	61.9 (2.44)	64.3 (2.53)	59.1 (2.33)	699.9 (27.56)
Average precipitation days (≥ 0.2 mm)	8.9	8.4	11.0	9.3	9.8	10.7	11.6	11.8	11.9	11.9	10.6	10.9	126.8
Average afternoon relative humidity (%)	64	67	67	66	67	68	67	64	62	64	66	64	65
Average dew point °C (°F)	12.2 (54.0)	12.8 (55.0)	12.1 (53.8)	10.3 (50.5)	8.7 (47.7)	7.0 (44.6)	6.1 (43.0)	6.2 (43.2)	6.7 (44.1)	8.0 (46.4)	10.0 (50.0)	10.7 (51.3)	9.2 (48.6)
Mean monthly sunshine hours	241.8	206.2	189.1	174.0	142.6	129.0	158.1	173.6	192.0	223.2	210.0	229.4	2,269
Percentage possible sunshine	53	53	49	53	46	47	54	53	54	54	48	49	51
Source: Bureau of Meteorology

== Services ==
Services in Scamander include:

- Resort Hotel
- Bottle Shop
- Two Caravan Parks
- Numerous Bed and Breakfasts
- Several small motels
- Supermarket/minimarket
- Petrol Station including mechanic
- Pharmacy
- Fast food store
- Surf Shop
- Post office
