= Akaroa, Tasmania =

Akaroa
- Town
- Coordinates: 41°17′10″S 148°20′18″E
- Country: Australia
- State: Tasmania
- Region: North-east
- LGA: Break O'Day
- Location: 13 km (8.1 mi) NE of St Helens

Government
  - State electorate: Lyons
  - Federal division: Lyons

Population
  - Total: 130 (2021 census)
- Postcode: 7216
Localities around Akaroa
Georges Bay	Tasman Sea	Tasman Sea
Georges Bay	Akaroa	Tasman Sea
Georges Bay	Stieglitz	Tasman Sea

Akaroa is a rural locality in the local government area (LGA) of Break O'Day in the North-east LGA region of Tasmania. The locality is about 13 kilometres (8.1 mi) north-east of the town of St Helens. The 2021 census recorded a population of 130 for Akaroa.

== History ==
Akaroa was gazetted as a locality in 1975. The name comes from a property that was so named in 1946 by a settler who had lived for some time in Akaroa in New Zealand. It is believed to be a Māori word for “long harbour” or “peaceful waters”.

== Geography ==
The waters of the Tasman Sea and Georges Bay form all boundaries of the locality except the southern.

== Road infrastructure ==
Route C851 (St Helens Point Road) enters from the south and runs through to the north, where it ends.
