= Mathinna, Tasmania =

Mathinna
- Town
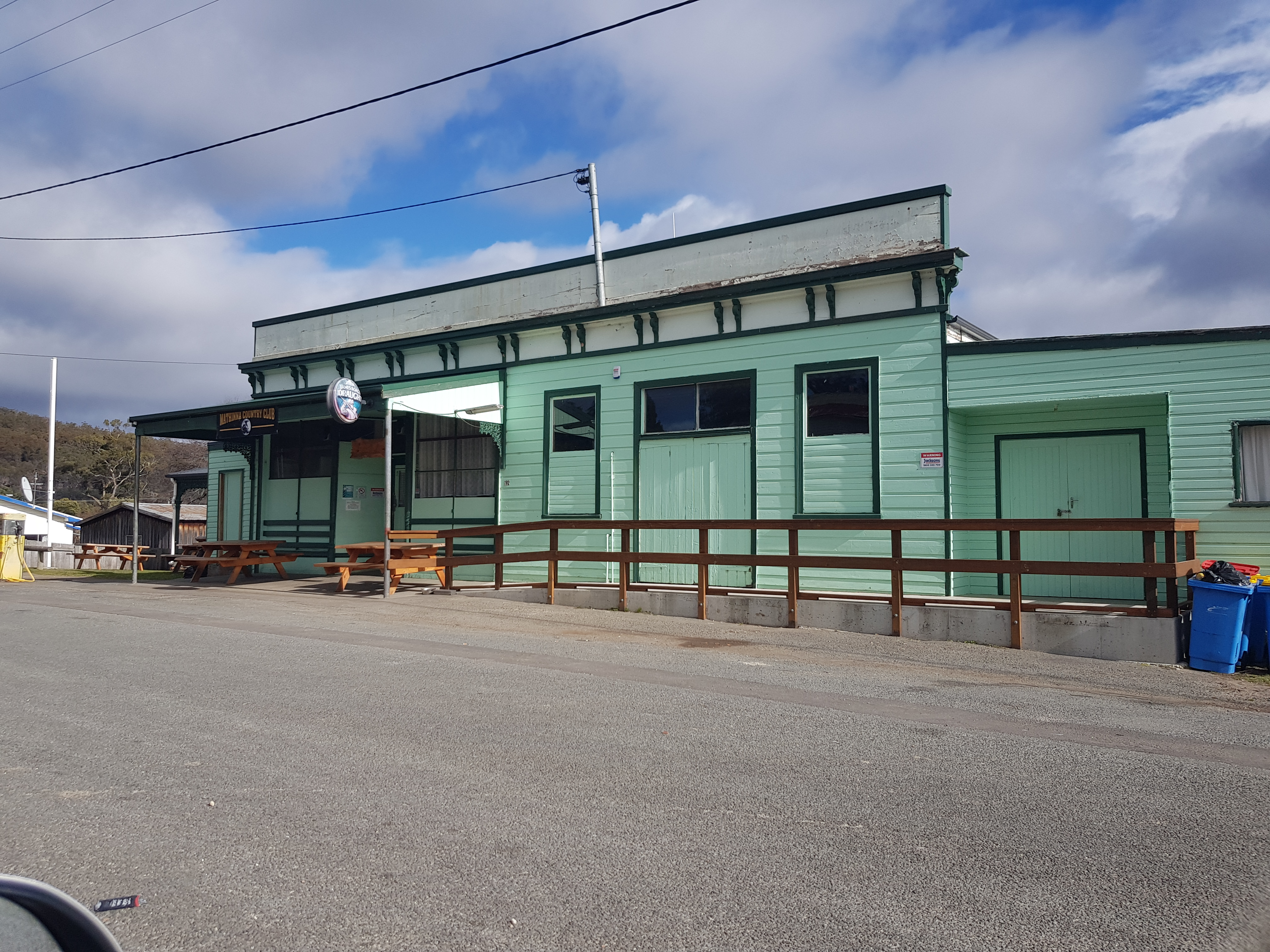

- Coordinates: 41°28′36.6″S 147°53′19.0″E
- Country: Australia
- State: Tasmania
- Region: North-east
- LGA: Break O'Day Council
- Location: 63 km (39 mi) from Launceston; 133 km (83 mi) from Devonport; 160 km (99 mi) from Hobart; 83 km (52 mi) SW of St Helens

Government
  - State electorate: Lyons
  - Federal division: Lyons

Area
  - Total: 1,370.4 km^{2} (529.1 sq mi)
- Elevation: 300 m (980 ft)

Population
  - Total: 131 (2021 census)
  - Density: 0.2/km^{2} (0.52/sq mi)
- Postcode: 7214
Localities around Mathinna
Alberton	Pyengana	St Helens
Upper Esk	Mathinna	Upper Scamander
Ben Lomond	Fingal, Mangana	St Marys

Mathinna is a rural locality in the local government areas (LGA) of Break O'Day (97%) and Dorset (3%) in the North-east LGA region of Tasmania. The locality is about 83 kilometres (52 mi) south-west of the town of St Helens. The 2016 census recorded a population of 142 for the state suburb of Mathinna.

It is a small Australian town in the north-east of Tasmania, 63 km east of Launceston. It was named after a young Aboriginal girl sent to live with the Lieutenant Governor of Van Diemen's Land, Sir John Franklin and his wife, Lady Jane Franklin.

== History ==
Mathinna was gazetted as a locality in 1976.

The town became established as a gold mining centre, shortly after gold was discovered in the area in the 1890s. The Golden Gate Mine in Mathinna was one of Tasmania's highest-yield gold mines, second only to Beaconsfield. At its peak in the late 1890s, the town sustained a population of over 5,000, including a large number of Chinese miners, making it the third largest town in Tasmania at the time. Melbourne-based mining company Riltec made a failed attempt to re-establish the Golden Gate mine in 1994, although recent gold mining efforts have been more successful, with a production target of 70,000 ounces made for the Mathinna mine in 2006.

Blackboy Post Office opened on 30 June 1870, was renamed Reedy Marsh, Blackboy in 1871 and Mathinna in 1882.

Former Premier of Tasmania Eric Reece, was born in the town in 1909.

== Geography ==
The Scamander River forms part of the northern and most of the north-eastern boundaries.

== Road infrastructure ==
Route B43 (Mathinna Road) enters from the south and runs north-west and west to the village. From there, the road continues west as C401 (Upper Esk Road).
