= Fingal, Tasmania =

Fingal
- Town
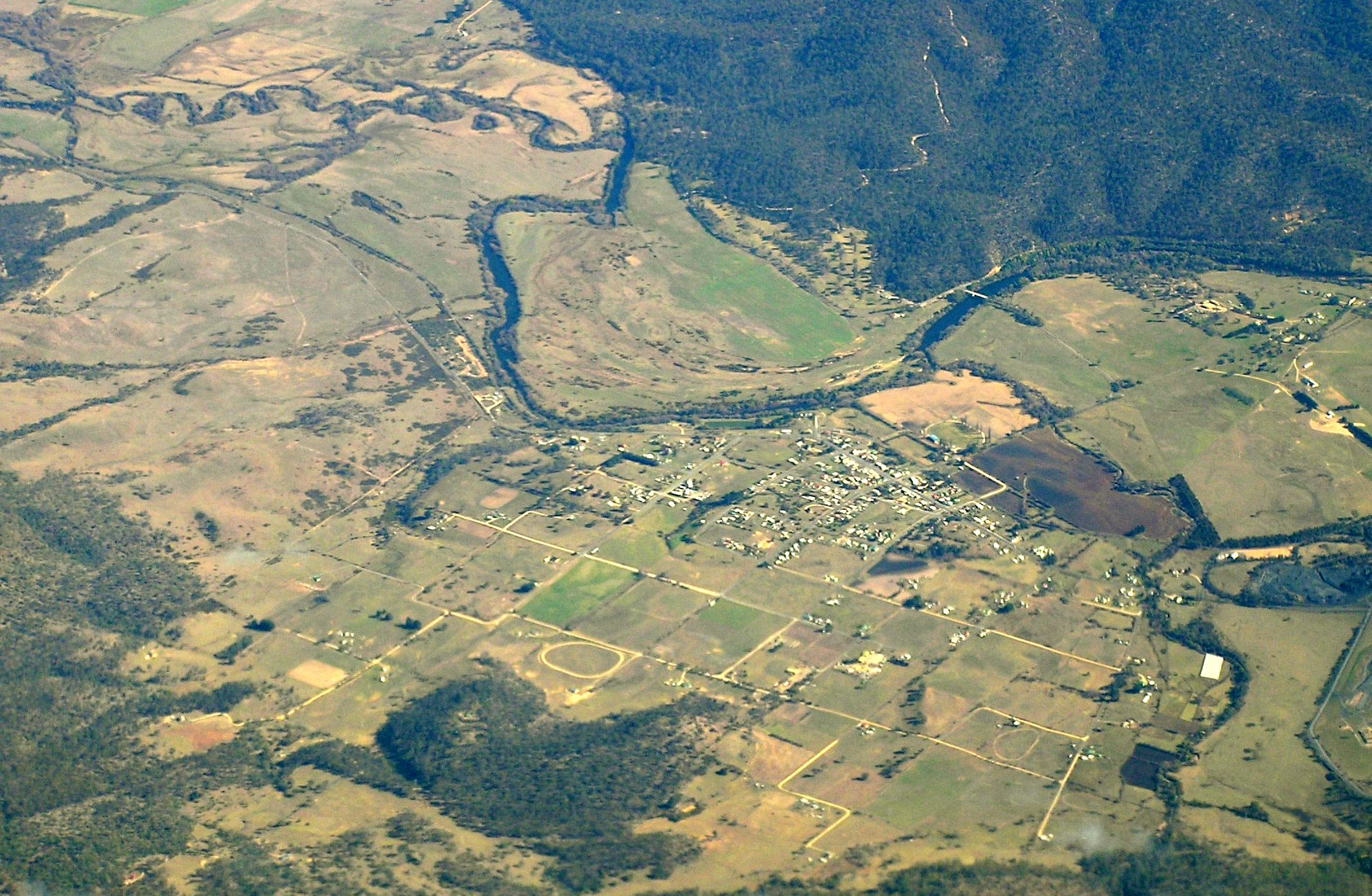
- Aerial photo from south east. South Esk River visible.

- Coordinates: 41°38′19″S 147°58′02″E
- Country: Australia
- State: Tasmania
- Region: North-east
- LGA: Break O'Day Council
- Location: 19 km (12 mi) W of St Marys; 72 km (45 mi) E of Launceston; 150 km (93 mi) NE of Hobart; 56 km (35 mi) SW of St Helens
- Established: 1827

Government
  - State electorate: Lyons
  - Federal division: Lyons

Area
  - Total: 4.6 km^{2} (1.8 sq mi)
- Elevation: 232 m (761 ft)

Population
  - Total: 431 (2021 census)
  - Density: 79.6/km^{2} (206/sq mi)
- Postcode: 7214
Localities around Fingal
Mangana	Mathinna	St Marys
Rossarden	Fingal	St Marys
Avoca	Royal George	Royal George

Fingal /fɪŋˈɔːl/ is a rural locality in the local government area (LGA) of Break O'Day in the North-east LGA region of Tasmania. The locality is about 56 kilometres (35 mi) south-west of the town of St Helens. The 2016 census recorded a population of 405 for the state suburb of Fingal.

It is a small town in the Fingal Valley in the north-east of Tasmania.

== History ==
Fingal was gazetted as a locality in 1965.

The Fingal area was surveyed in 1824 by Roderic O'Connor and John Helder Wedge, and is believed to have been named after Fingal's Cave in the Inner Hebrides of Scotland rather than Fingal in Ireland. The town of Fingal came into existence in 1827 as a convict station, and experienced a boom when Van Diemen's Land's first payable gold was discovered in nearby Mangana.

Fingal Post Office opened on 1 June 1832.

In July 2025, the Fingal Post Office was close to being shut down but was reopened in September 2025.

== Geography ==
Almost all the boundaries are survey lines. The South Esk River flows through from north to south-west.

=== Climate ===
Climate data for Fingal (Legge Street) (237 AMSL)
Month	Jan	Feb	Mar	Apr	May	Jun	Jul	Aug	Sep	Oct	Nov	Dec	Year
Record high °C (°F)	41.3 (106.3)	36.4 (97.5)	35.7 (96.3)	29.4 (84.9)	25.3 (77.5)	20.7 (69.3)	19.2 (66.6)	22.2 (72.0)	29.0 (84.2)	31.6 (88.9)	35.4 (95.7)	39.3 (102.7)	41.3 (106.3)
Mean daily maximum °C (°F)	23.8 (74.8)	22.9 (73.2)	21.6 (70.9)	18.4 (65.1)	15.3 (59.5)	12.7 (54.9)	12.2 (54.0)	13.3 (55.9)	15.4 (59.7)	17.6 (63.7)	19.8 (67.6)	21.7 (71.1)	17.9 (64.2)
Mean daily minimum °C (°F)	10.4 (50.7)	10.1 (50.2)	8.2 (46.8)	5.3 (41.5)	2.8 (37.0)	1.1 (34.0)	0.6 (33.1)	1.2 (34.2)	3.2 (37.8)	4.9 (40.8)	7.2 (45.0)	8.8 (47.8)	5.3 (41.5)
Record low °C (°F)	0.1 (32.2)	−0.2 (31.6)	−1.9 (28.6)	−4.8 (23.4)	−8.1 (17.4)	−9 (16)	−8.1 (17.4)	−7.4 (18.7)	−6.2 (20.8)	−4.6 (23.7)	−2.1 (28.2)	−1.5 (29.3)	−9 (16)
Average rainfall mm (inches)	44.5 (1.75)	40.4 (1.59)	45.0 (1.77)	51.1 (2.01)	50.7 (2.00)	65.4 (2.57)	54.9 (2.16)	59.8 (2.35)	49.8 (1.96)	53.2 (2.09)	46.0 (1.81)	49.7 (1.96)	608.3 (23.95)
Average rainy days (≥ 0.2 mm)	7.2	6.5	7.9	8.3	9.6	10.8	12.0	11.4	10.8	10.8	9.4	8.7	113.4
Source: Bureau of Meteorology

== Road infrastructure ==
Route A4 (Esk Highway) runs through from south-west to north-east.

== See also ==
- Electoral district of Fingal, former Tasmanian House of Assembly district
