= Avoca, Tasmania =

Town in Tasmania, Australia

Avoca
- Town
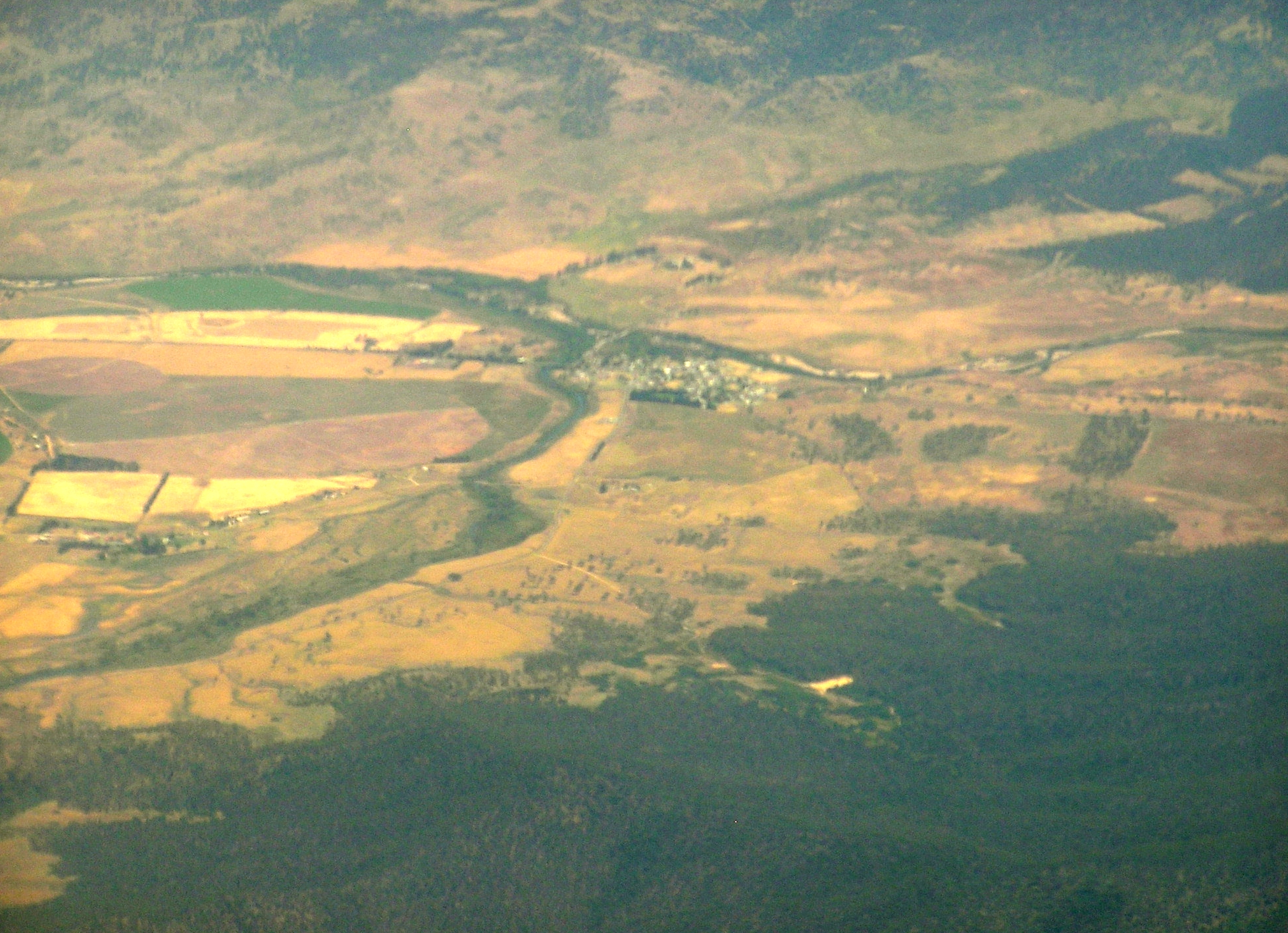
- Aerial photo of the region from the east

- Coordinates: 41°46′53″S 147°43′19″E
- Country: Australia
- State: Tasmania
- Region: Central, North-east
- LGA: Northern Midlands, Break O'Day
- Location: 167 km (104 mi) N of Hobart; 81 km (50 mi) S of Launceston; 29 km (18 mi) SW of Fingal; 69 km (43 mi) SE of Longford

Government
  - State electorate: Lyons
  - Federal division: Lyons

Population
  - Total: 192 (SAL 2021)
- Postcode: 7213
Localities around Avoca
Deddington	Rossarden	Fingal
Conara	Avoca	Royal George
Campbell Town	Lake Leake	Royal George

Avoca is a rural locality in the local government areas (LGA) of Northern Midlands (99%) and Break O'Day (1%) in the Central and North-east LGA regions of Tasmania. The locality is about 69 kilometres (43 mi) south-east of the town of Longford. The 2021 census recorded a population of 192 for Avoca.

It is a small village located 81 kilometres (50 mi) south-east of Launceston in Tasmania.

Avoca is situated on the banks of the South Esk River near the confluence of the St. Paul's river in the parish of Avoca and county of Cornwall, and was first settled in the 1830s. It was originally named St. Paul's Plains by John Helder Wedge during a 1833 survey of the area. The area was officially settled in 1834 as a farming, coal and tin mining village.

== History ==
Avoca is a confirmed locality.

In the 19th century, the town had a small Anglican church (St. Thomas', designed by James Blackburn), a school, and a police station. St. Paul's river was crossed by a small stone bridge. St. Paul's Plains Post Office opened on 1 June 1832 and was renamed Avoca in 1837.

Today, mines in the area have closed and Avoca serves only as a farming community.

== Geography ==
Almost all the boundaries are survey lines. The South Esk River flows through from north-east to south-west.

== Road infrastructure ==
Route A4 (Esk Highway) runs through from south-west to north-east, and Route C301 (Royal George Road) runs through from north-east to south-east, while Route B42 (Storys Creek Road) runs through from north-east, providing access to the town centre of Avoca.

== Landmarks ==
A number of historic buildings exist in the small town, including the St Thomas Anglican Church completed on 8 May 1842, the parish hall completed around 1850, and the Union Hotel built in 1842. Nearby locations include Rossarden, Fingal, and Storys Creek.
