= Pyengana =

- Town
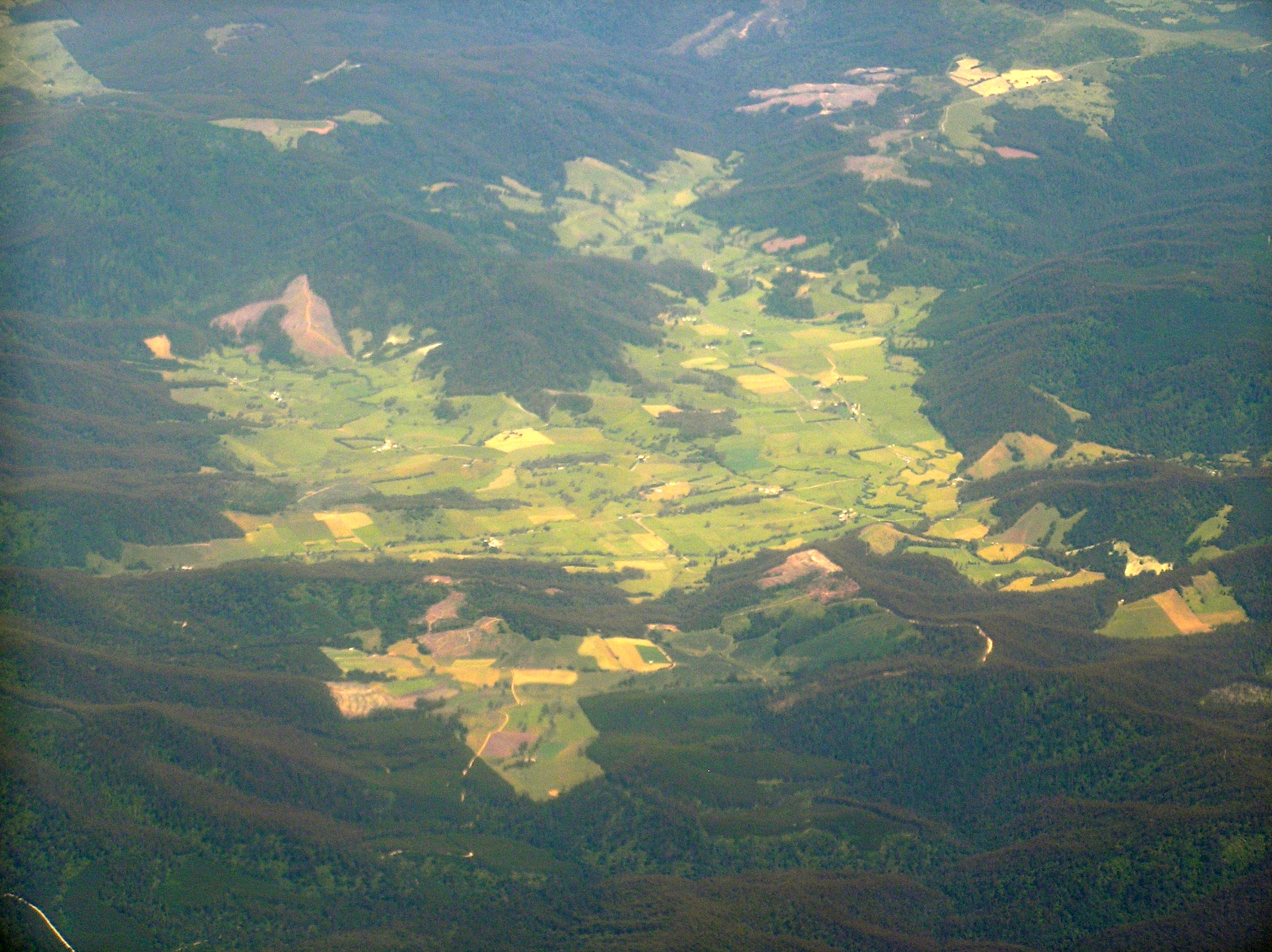
- Aerial photo of Pyengana region

- Coordinates: 41°17′22″S 148°00′17″E
- Country: Australia
- State: Tasmania
- LGA: Break O'Day Council

Government
  - State electorate: Lyons
  - Federal division: Lyons

Population
  - Total: 96 (SAL 2021)
- Postcode: 7216

Pyengana is a village in north-east Tasmania, Australia. It is part of the Break O'Day Council administrative region, with less than 1% in the Dorset LGA. The regional centre is St Helens which is approximately 27 kilometres (17 mi) to the east. Pyengana is a rural farming region with a number of natural and historical heritage sites.

== History ==
Permanent settlement commenced around 1875 with pioneering settlers such as George and Margaret Cotton who raised a family of nine children at the property they called St Columba.

Georges River Post Office opened on 1 December 1885 and was renamed Pyengana in 1888.

The area had several tin mines such as the Anchor Tin Mine and Battery situated in the Pyengana Pass.

== Demographics ==
At the 2006 census, Pyengana had a population of 123. The 2016 census recorded a population of 104, while at the 2021 census, the population had decreased to 96.

== Natural heritage areas ==
Natural heritage areas include St Columba Falls (a cascading waterfall with the highest plunge of 90 metres), Halls Falls, and Blue Tier.

== Local businesses ==
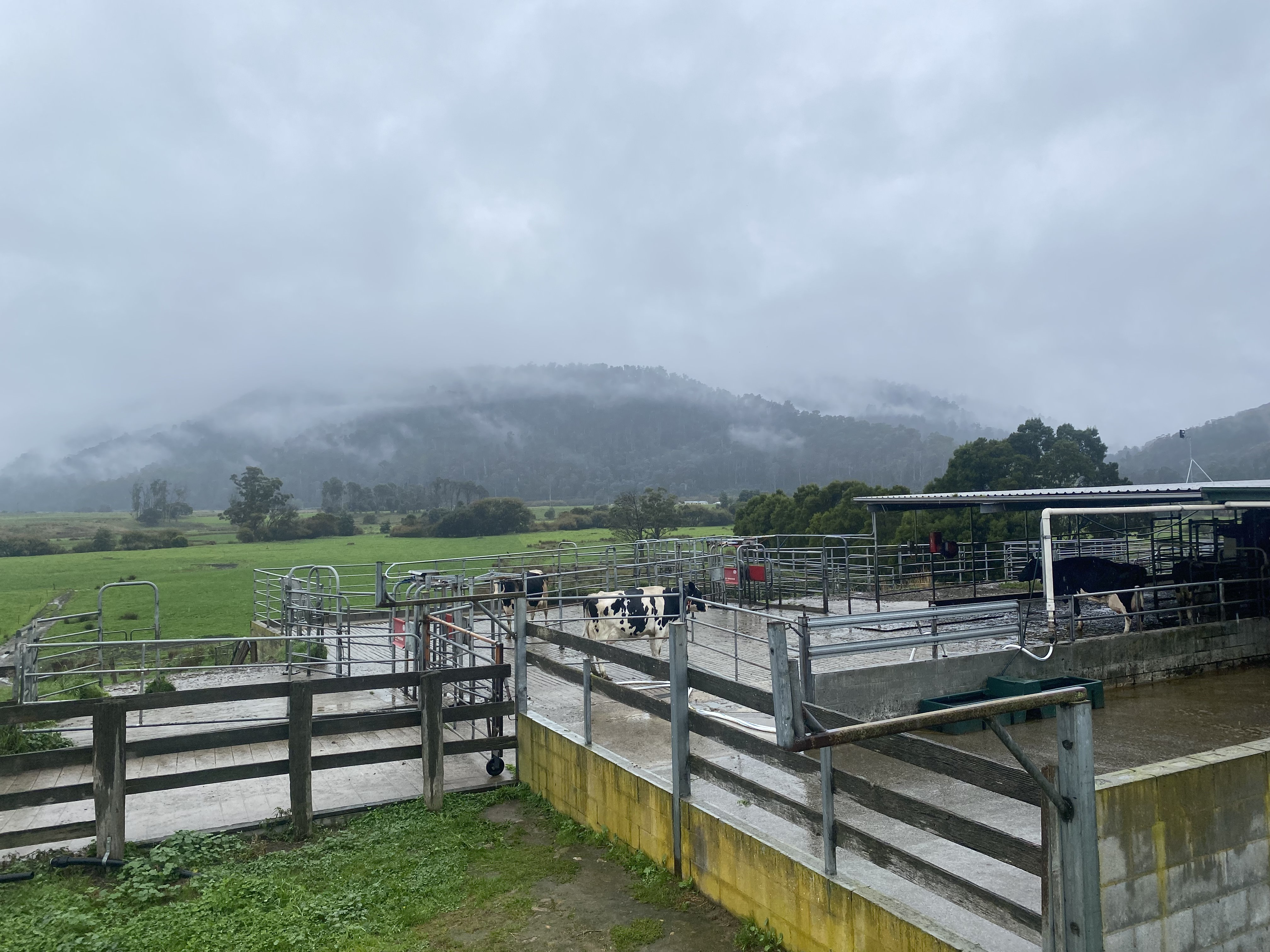
Milking Shed at Pyengana Dairy.

The area is known for its Pyengana Cheese Factory which was founded by 4th generation cheese maker Jon Healey and his family. The factory specialises in cloth-bound cheddar.

Another local business is the 'Pub in the Paddock' which was established in 1900 and is inside a paddock. It boasted a beer-drinking pig, which has since passed on, but there is another pig there now that will also drink beer, but only that which is brought to it by the public.

Anchor Farms began growing organic gourmet potatoes in 1995 and now supply nationwide and export to South East Asia.
