= Douglas-Apsley National Park =

National park in Australia

- IUCN category II (national park)
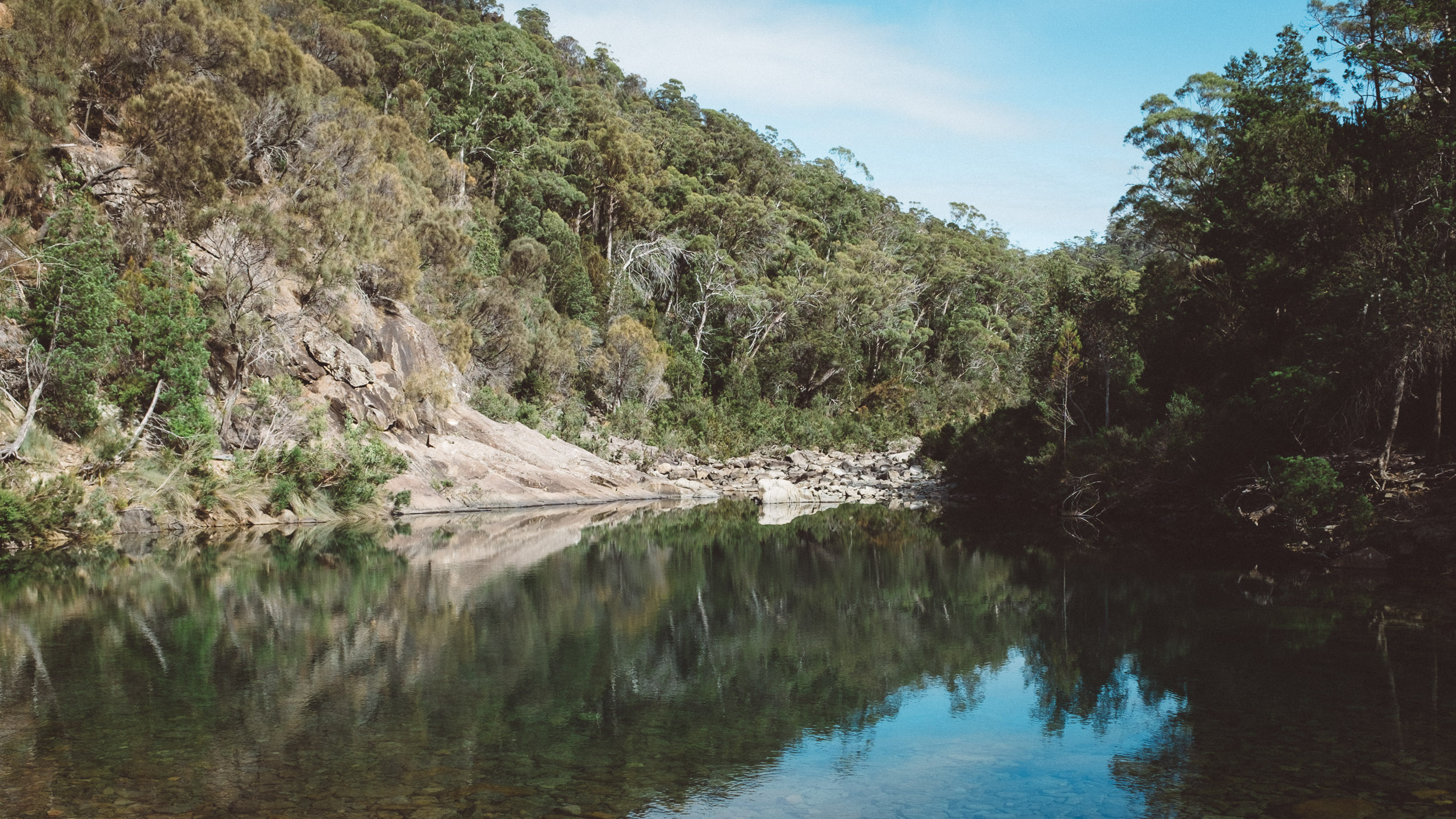
- Douglas-Apsley National Park, April 2017

- Location within Tasmania
- Interactive map of Douglas-Apsley National Park
- Location: Tasmania
- Nearest city: Bicheno
- Coordinates: 41°45′30″S 148°11′58″E
- Area: 160.8 km^{2} (62.1 sq mi)
- Established: 1989
- Governing body: Tasmania Parks and Wildlife Service
- Website: Official website

Douglas-Apsley is a national park and a locality on the east coast of Tasmania, Australia, 149 km northeast of Hobart, and a few kilometres north of Bicheno. It is one of Tasmania's newer National Parks, having been declared on 27 December 1989.

== Description ==
The park preserves remnant east coast dry forested catchment of three main streams, Apsley River, Denison Rivulet and Douglas River. Highlights include deep gorges, wildflower displays and mild inland climate. Visitors can undertake short walks or do a three-day trek.

== Birds ==
The park has been identified by BirdLife International as an Important Bird Area because it supports 11 of Tasmania's endemic bird species as well as flame and pink robins and, probably, swift parrots.

== See also ==
- Protected areas of Tasmania
