= Break O'Day Council =

- Local government area
- Interactive map of Break O'Day Council
- Coordinates: 41.4238°S 148.0524°E
- Country: Australia
- State: Tasmania
- Region: Northern East Coast
- Established: 2 April 1993
- Council seat: St Helens

Government
  - Mayor: Mick Tucker
  - State electorate: Lyons
  - Federal division: Lyons

Area
  - Total: 3,524 km^{2} (1,361 sq mi)

Population
  - Total: 6,770 (2021)
  - Density: 1.7/km^{2} (4.4/sq mi)
- Website: Break O'Day Council
LGAs around Break O'Day Council
| Dorset | Dorset | Tasman Sea |
| Launceston | Break O'Day Council | Tasman Sea |
| Northern Midlands | Glamorgan Spring Bay | Tasman Sea |

Break O'Day Council is a local government body in Tasmania, situated in the northern part of the state's east coast. Break O'Day is classified as a rural local government area and has a population of 6,770, the major towns of the region include St Helens, St Marys and Scamander.

== History and attributes ==
The municipality was established on 2 April 1993. Originally proclaimed as Portland-Fingal, the name was later changed to Break O'Day.

Break O'Day is classified as rural, agricultural and large (RAL) under the Australian Classification of Local Governments.

== Council ==
=== Current composition and election method ===
Break O'Day Council is composed of nine councillors elected using the Hare-Clark system of proportional representation as a single ward. All councillors are elected for a fixed four-year term of office. The mayor and deputy mayor are each directly elected for a four-year term. The mayor and deputy mayor must also be elected as councillors in order to hold office. Elections are normally held in October, with the next election due to be held in October 2026. Neither the Labor Party nor the Liberal Party endorse local government candidates in Tasmania.

The most recent election of councillors was held in October 2022, and the makeup of the council is as follows:

| Party | Councillors |
|---|---|
| Independents | 7 |
| Independent Labor | 1 |
| Greens | 1 |
| Total | 9 |

The current Council, elected in 2022 is:

| Councillor | Party | Notes |
|---|---|---|
| Mick Tucker | Independent | Mayor |
| Janet Drummond | Unaligned | |
| Kristi Chapple | Unaligned | Deputy Mayor |
| Barry LeFevre | Independent | |
| Garry Barnes | Unaligned | |
| Liz Johnstone | Tasmanian Greens | |
| Kylie Wright | Independent Labor | |
| Ian Carter | Unaligned | |
| Vaughan Oldham | Unaligned | |

=== 2022 election results ===
2022 Tasmanian local elections: Break O'Day
| Party | Candidate | Votes | % | ±% |
|---|---|---|---|---|
| Independent | Mick Tucker (elected) | 1,267 | 26.63 | |
| Independent | Janet Drummond (elected) | 711 | 14.95 | |
| Independent | Gary Barnes (elected) | 376 | 7.90 | |
| Greens | Liz Johnstone (elected) | 329 | 6.92 | |
| Independent | Kristi Chapple (elected) | 289 | 6.08 | |
| Independent | Ian Carter (elected) | 271 | 5.70 | |
| Independent | Vaughan Oldham (elected) | 227 | 4.77 | |
| Independent Labor | Kylie Wright (elected) | 209 | 4.39 | |
| Independent | Barry LeFevre (elected) | 202 | 4.25 | |
| Independent | Stephen Walley | 187 | 3.93 | |
| Independent | Lesa Whittaker | 160 | 3.36 | |
| Independent | Tim Gowans | 141 | 2.96 | |
| Independent | Cindy Kurtukoff | 120 | 2.52 | |
| Independent | John LeFevre | 85 | 1.79 | |
| Independent | Russell Montgomery | 76 | 1.60 | |
| Independent | Rosina Gallace | 45 | 0.95 | |
| Independent | Bob Hoogland | 31 | 0.65 | |
| Independent | Randy James Wilson | 31 | 0.65 | |
| Total formal votes | | 4,757 | 97.14 | |
| Informal votes | | 140 | 2.86 | |
| Turnout | | 4,897 | 84.50 | |

== Suburbs ==
| Suburb | Census population 2016 | Reason |
|---|---|---|
| Mount William | 0 | |
| Eddystone | 0 | |
| Ansons Bay | 31 | |
| Lottah | 13 | |
| The Gardens | 19 | |
| Binalong Bay | 290 | |
| Akaroa | 132 | |
| Stieglitz | 562 | |
| Dianas Basin | | Incl in St. Helens |
| Beaumaris | 289 | |
| Scamander | 638 | |
| Upper Scamander | 44 | |
| Falmouth | 102 | |
| Four Mile Creek | 96 | |
| Chain of Lagoons | 21 | |
| Seymour | 25 | |
| Douglas River | 30 | |
| Ormley | | Incl. in Fingal |
| Tullochgorum | | Incl. in Fingal |
| Fingal | 405 | Includes Ormley, Tolluchgorum, Frodsley |
| Mount Nicholas | | Incl. in St. Mary's |
| Cornwall | 65 | |
| Cullenswood | | Incl. in St. Mary's |
| St. Mary's | 682 | Includes Mount Nicholas, Cullenswood |
| Gray | 69 | |
| Mathinna | 142 | |
| Upper Esk | 26 | Includes Roses Tier |
| Mangana | 36 | |
| Roses Tier | | Incl. in Upper Esk |
| Frodsley | | Incl. in Fingal |
| Weldborough | 28 | |
| Pyengana | 104 | |
| Goulds Country | 77 | |
| Goshen | 93 | |
| St. Helen's | 2070 | Includes Priory |
| Priory | | Incl. in St. Helen's |
| Total | 6,089 | |
| | 15 | Variance |
| Local government total | 6,104 | Gazetted Break O'Day Council local government area |

=== Not in above list ===
- Gladstone
- Tayene
- Upper Blessington

== See also ==
- Local government areas of Tasmania
