= St Marys, Tasmania =

Town in north-east Tasmania

St Marys
- Town
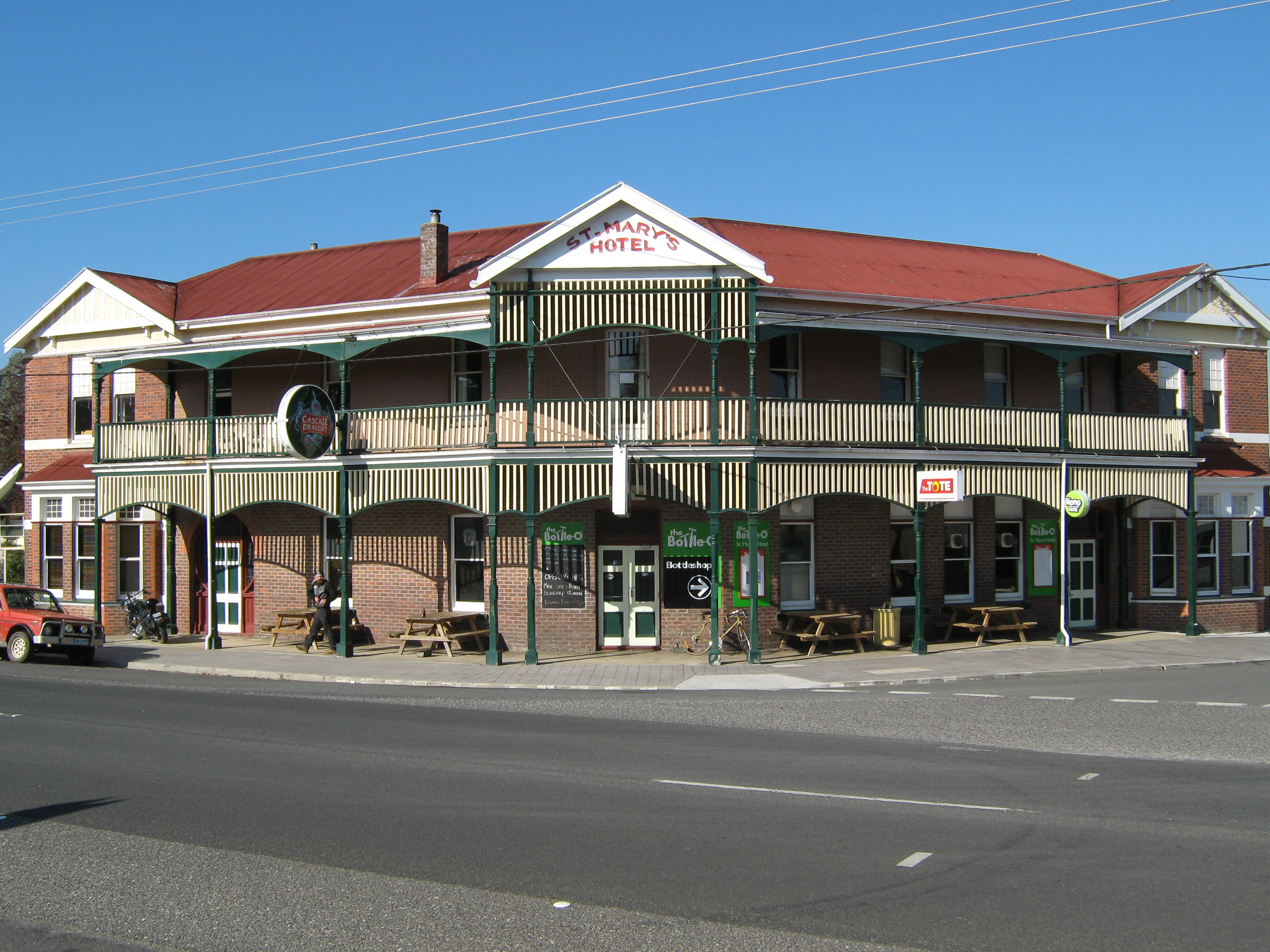
- St Marys Hotel in July 2006

- Coordinates: 41°34′43″S 148°11′08″E
- Country: Australia
- State: Tasmania
- LGA: Break O'Day Council
- Location: 18 km (11 mi) from Scamander; 36 km (22 mi) from St Helens; 128 km (80 mi) from Launceston; 221 km (137 mi) from Hobart

Government
  - State electorate: Lyons
  - Federal division: Lyons
- Elevation: 258 m (846 ft)

Population
  - Total: 738 (2021 census)
- Postcode: 7215

St Marys (or Saint Marys) is a small township nestled at the junction of the Tasman Highway and the Esk Highway on the East Coast of Tasmania, Australia approximately 10 kilometres (six miles) from the coast.

It had a population of 738 as of the 2021 census, although in the early 2000s it was one of the fastest growing areas of Tasmania. The town is part of the Break O'Day Council. Its amenities include a craft gallery, bakery, accommodation, shops and supermarkets, and the St Marys Hotel, built in 1916, which dominates the town centre.

Located beneath a rocky outcrop, St Patricks Head (694 metres/2,277 feet), St Marys is a 240 kilometre/149 mile drive north east of Hobart, via Swansea and Bicheno or 130 kilometres/80 miles east of Launceston. It is possible to reach the town from the coast by crossing the mountains via St Marys Pass or Elephant Pass.

== Town description ==
The Town Centre of St Marys

The town is mostly built on hill on the northern side of St Marys, while the town centre almost remains flat. The town can be accessed through three ways such as the Esk Highway (A4), St Marys Pass (Esk Highway), and Elephant Pass Road (A4). Despite only having fifteen streets, it contains a lot of buildings, and shops in the town centre, even a community hospital called St Marys Community Health Centre which isn't in the town centre but rather in the northern side of St Marys on Gardiners Creek Road. The town centre contains two IGA Supermarkets, the St Marys Hotel, Takeaway shops, Pharmacy, Purple Possum Wholefoods and Cafe, Bakery, Library, Community Health Centre, Fire, and Ambulance Station, and more.

== History ==
St Marys is a confirmed locality.

The first European contact with the district occurred when Captain Tobias Furneaux sighted and named the 694 metre St Patrick's Head in 1773. The early settlement of Van Diemen's Land, which mostly occurred between Hobart and George Town, took little interest in the St Marys area.

It wasn't until the 1840s that a probation station, housing 300 convicts, was built at Grassy Bottom between the town and St Marys Pass. They were assigned to build the road across the mountains to the east coast. This was done between 1843 and 1846.

The arrival of the Railway in 1886 led to the town's increasing importance as a service centre. The Elephant Pass route was completed in 1888, which resulted in goods moving across the mountains to the east coast settlements of Bicheno and Chain of Lagoons. In turn this resulted in a small increase in population as the town became a service centre for the surrounding dairy farms.

St. Patrick's Head Post Office opened on 1 June 1835. It was renamed Cullenswood in 1849 and St Marys in 1869.

== Geology ==
There were two volcanic eruptions of alkali-olivine basalt at 233 ± 5 million years ago. Tuff from calc-alkaline volcanoes to the east of Tasmania produced some layers in the upper sediments. An ashfall tuff in the Denison Rivulet area of eastern Tasmania is dated at 214 ± 1 million years ago (Late Triassic).

== Tourism ==
St Marys is close to several local attractions, including a trail to the top of St Patricks Head, or the more accessible South Sister Peak, which have forest and coastal views. There are also views from Elephant Pass.

The Coalminers' Heritage Wall and Heritage Walk at the tiny settlement of Cornwall is a monument to the miners who hand-tunnelled a coal mine beneath the Mount Nicholas Range.

Tourists also visit the nearby waterfalls, fish at Lake Leake or go bushwalking in Douglas Apsley National Park.

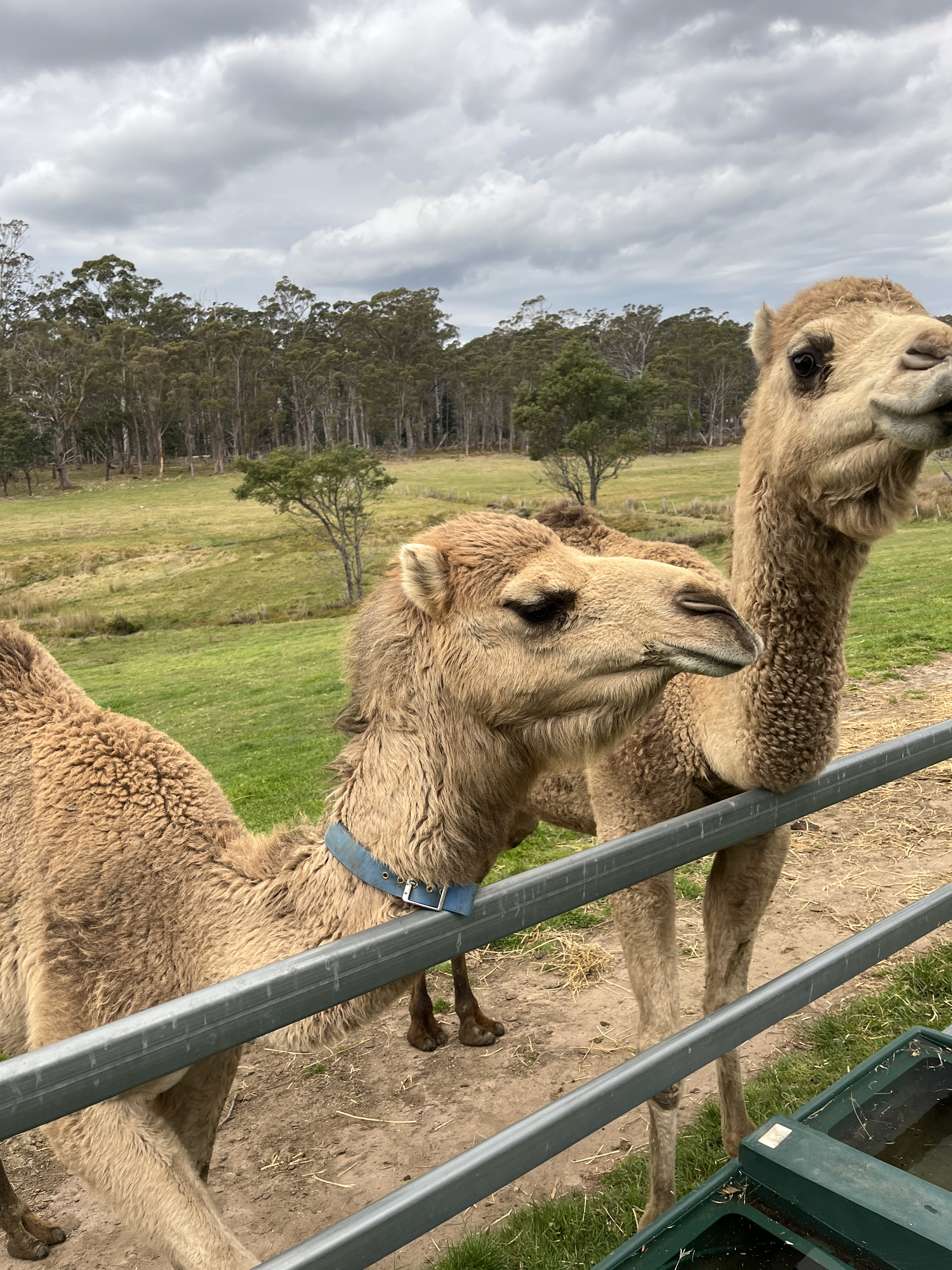
St Marys Camel Farm

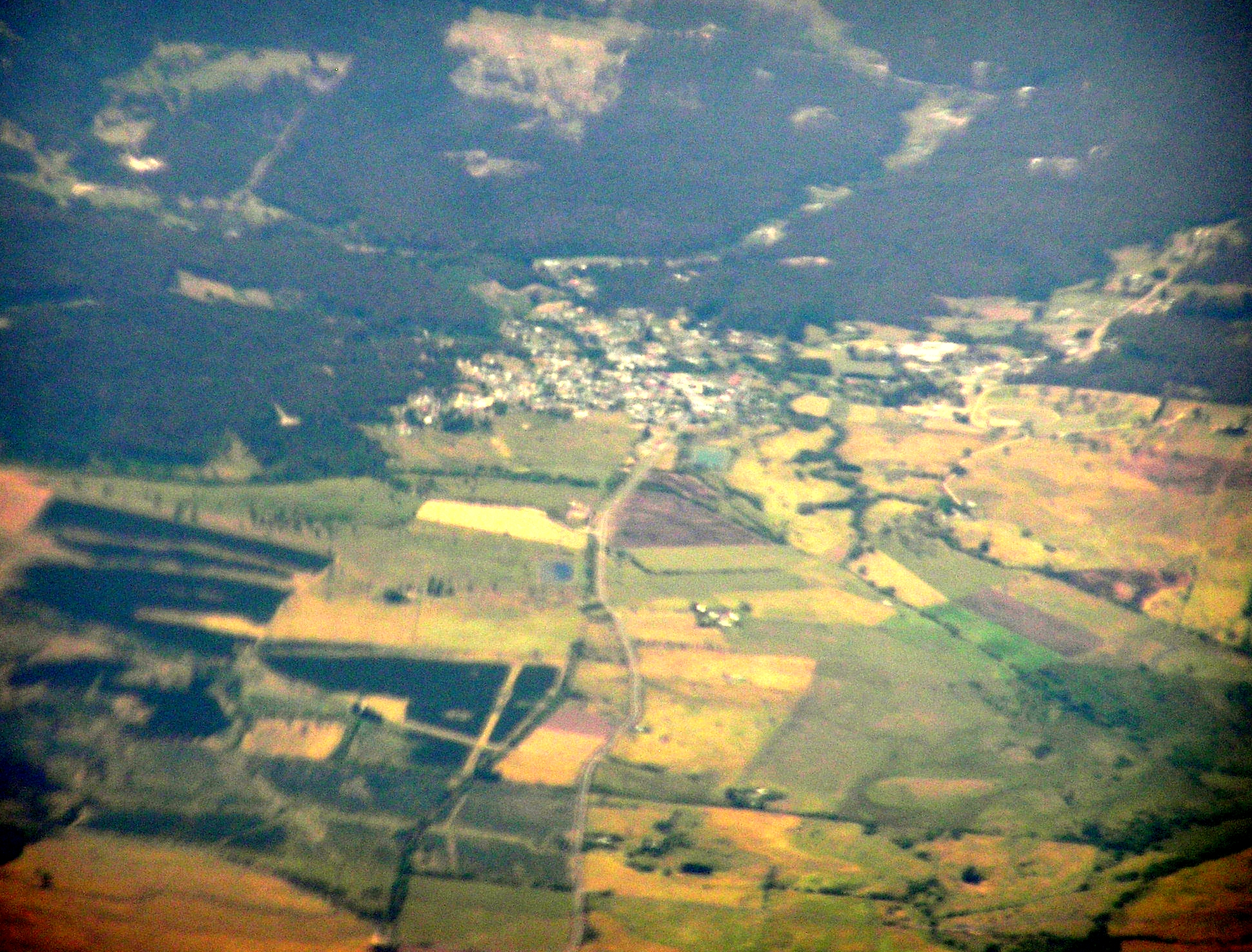
Aerial view from west

Christ Church is an unusual little church standing in the middle of fields a few kilometres to the west of St Marys. The church was built in 1847 and was connected with the large property, 'Cullenswood', which was established in the late 1820s by Robert Vincent Legge who arrived in Van Diemen's Land in 1827. The main residence, 'Cullenswood', was built in 1845 and is located on Cornwall Road off the Esk Highway. It is a two-storey rubblestone Georgian building with a columned verandah and iron-hipped roof. It is not open for inspection.

There is a camel farm in St. Marys that offers interactions with camels, a museum and other activities.

In December 2006, bushfires ravaged the nearby area.
