= List of mayors of Glamorgan–Spring Bay Council =

Mayor of Glamorgan–Spring Bay Council
- Incumbent; Cheryl Arnol since 25 October 2022
- Style: "Madam Mayor" (Note: Commonly used during Arnol's term) "Mayor (surname)" (Note: Commonly used during Mayor Kent's term by Cr Debbie Wisby)
- Member of: Glamorgan–Spring Bay Council
- Seat: Triabunna, Tasmania
- Term length: 4 years (renewable)
- Constituting instrument: Local Government Act, 1993
- Precursor: Mayor of Spring Bay; Mayor of Glamorgan
- Formation: 2 April 1993
- Deputy: Deputy Mayor (Michael Symons)
- Salary: $42,717 AUD (Note: This is the combined allowance payable to the Mayor due to the mayor also being a councillor. Does not include various other allowances payable to councillors.)

The Mayor of Glamorgan–Spring Bay Council is the chair and official spokesperson of Glamorgan–Spring Bay Council in Tasmania, Australia. Cheryl Arnol is the current mayor of GSBC, having been elected in the 2022 Tasmanian local elections to succeed Robert Forbes-Young as the by-elected member.

== Table of mayors and deputy mayors ==
Although GSBC was established in 1993, the is no historical records to show who held the mayoral and deputy-mayoral positions until 1999.

Party	Mayor	Term	Deputy	Party	Term	Ref.
Independent	Cheryl Arnol	1999–2005 (Note: Arnol resigned before the end of her term in 2005 due to alleged abuse from the community due to decisions she had taken on council)	Craig Johnston	Independent	1999–2004	
Independent	Harris Howard	2005–2007	Martin Crawford	Independent	2005–2007	
Independent	Bertrand Cadart	2007–2014	Jenifer Crawford	Independent	2007–2014	
Independent	Michael Kent (Note: Kent was the first mayor of the council to be elected without having previous councillorship)	2014–2018	Cheryl Arnol	Country Alliance	2014–2018	
Independent	Debbie Wisby	2018–2020 (Note: Wisby resigned due to reported abuse by her to her staff. Robert Forbes-Young was elected in by-election to serve until 2022 elections.)	Jenny Woods	Independent	2018–2022	
Independent	Robert Young	2020–2022	Jenny Woods	Independent	2018–2022	
Independent SFF	Cheryl Arnol	2022–present	Michael Symons	Independent	2022–present	
