= Rocky Hills, Tasmania =

Rocky Hills
- Town
- Coordinates: 42°13′46″S 148°00′40″E
- Country: Australia
- State: Tasmania
- Region: South-east
- LGA: Glamorgan–Spring Bay
- Location: 37 km (23 mi) N of Triabunna

Government
  - State electorate: Lyons
  - Federal division: Lyons

Population
  - Total: 12 (2016 census)
- Postcode: 7190
Localities around Rocky Hills
Swansea	Swansea	Great Oyster Bay
Tooms Lake	Rocky Hills	Great Oyster Bay
Tooms Lake, Little Swanport	Little Swanport	Great Oyster Bay

Rocky Hills is a rural locality in the local government area (LGA) of Glamorgan–Spring Bay in the South-east LGA region of Tasmania. The locality is about 37 kilometres (23 mi) north of the town of Triabunna. The 2016 census recorded a population of 12 for the state suburb of Rocky Hills.

== History ==
Rocky Hills is a confirmed locality.

== Geography ==
The eastern boundary follows the shoreline of Great Oyster Bay.

== Road infrastructure ==
Route A3 (Tasman Highway) passes through from south-east to north-east.
