= Municipality of Spring Bay =

Local government area in Tasmania

The Municipality of Spring Bay was a local government area in Tasmania which existed from 1860 to 1993. The council seat was at Triabunna.

It was proclaimed by Governor Charles Du Cane on 10 September 1860 as the Rural Municipality of Spring Bay. The first election was held on 19 October 1860 and elected six councillors, with George Rudd becoming the first warden.

It covered an area of 330,000 acres, with the main towns being Buckland, Orford, Swanston and Triabunna.

It was reconstituted as the Municipality of Spring Bay with effect from 2 January 1908 under the Local Government Act 1906, which abolished existing bodies as part of sweeping local government reform but established a municipality of the same name with similar boundaries. Its boundaries were then explained as: "[extending] from Richmond on the west, to the eastern shores of Maria Island, north to Little Swanport River or Glamorgan municipality, and southerly to the Sorell municipality". It was then divided into three wards.

The council built a new council chambers and community centre in the 1950s.

It amalgamated with the Municipality of Glamorgan to form the Glamorgan–Spring Bay Council in April 1993.

== Wardens ==
Wardens of Spring Bay included:

- G. H. Rudd (1860-1868)
- F. Aubin (1868-1873)
- T. Cruttenden (1873-1874)
- Chas. Meredith (1874-1875)
- G. E. Mace (1875-1876)
- F. Mace (1876-1877)
- Chas. Meredith (1877-1879)
- S. Salmon (1879-1880)
- F. Mace (1880-1883)
- G. A. Mace (1883-1884)
- J. R. F. Mace (1884-1889)
- W. Lester (1889-1890)
- F. Mace (1890-1893)
- unknown (1893-1904)
- H. G. Rudd (1904-1908)
- F. Mace (1909-1920)
- A. H. Salmon (1921-1927)
- W. B. Gatehouse (1928-1929)
- L. Bresnahan (1930-1935)
