= Pontypool, Tasmania =

Pontypool Tasmania
- Coordinates: 42°19′38″S 147°57′35″E
- Population: 53 (2016 census)
- Postcode(s): 7190
- Location: 25 km (16 mi) N of Triabunna
- LGA(s): Glamorgan–Spring Bay
- Region: South-east
- State electorate(s): Lyons
- Federal division(s): Lyons
Localities around Pontypool:
Little Swanport	Little Swanport	Little Swanport
Little Swanport	Pontypool	Little Swanport River
Little Swanport	Little Swanport River	Little Swanport River

Pontypool is a rural locality in the local government area (LGA) of Glamorgan–Spring Bay in the South-east LGA region of Tasmania. The locality is about 25 kilometres (16 mi) north of the town of Triabunna. The 2016 census recorded a population of 53 for the state suburb of Pontypool.

== History ==
Pontypool is a confirmed locality. Pontypool, meaning “bridge by a pool”, is a town in Wales, and the likely source of the locality name.

== Geography ==
The southern and eastern boundaries follow the shoreline of the Little Swanport River estuary.

== Road infrastructure ==
Route A3 (Tasman Highway) runs along the western boundary. From there, Pontypool Road provides access to the locality.
