= Carmichael Lyne =

Australian politician (1861–1929)

Carmichael Lyne (30 July 1861 – 28 November 1929) was an Australian politician. He was a member of the Tasmanian House of Assembly from 1900 to 1906, representing the seat of Ringarooma.

Lyne was born at his family's property near Swansea, Tasmania, the son of pastoralist John Lyne and brother of future Premier of New South Wales William Lyne. He was educated at Horton College before becoming a pastoralist like his father, initially managing his father's Glamorgan property. He was a councillor of the Municipality of Glamorgan, chairman of both the Police Court and Court of Petty Sessions at Glamorgan, warden and chairman of the Glamorgan Road Trust (in 1892–93) and a member of the executive committee of the Tasmanian Pastoral and Agricultural Association.

In 1898, Lyne moved from Glamorgan to the Trevallyn Estate near Launceston. He was elected to the House of Assembly at the 1900 election in the seat of Ringarooma. He was re-elected unopposed in 1903. Lyne was Minister for Lands and Works, Minister for Mines and Minister for Railways in the short-lived Propsting government in 1903–04. He initially declared his intention to recontest his seat in 1906, but abruptly withdrew less than two weeks before polling day.

Lyne returned to his pastoral and grazing properties after his political career. He was a member of a 1907 Royal Commission into local government in Tasmania. He moved to the Riccarton Estate at Campbell Town in 1909, leasing and then purchasing the estate. During this time, he was a member of the Tasmanian Wheat Pool and was appointed as a Coroner. He retired to Hobart in 1919, leaving his son to manage Riccarton. He was president of the Tasmanian Farmers, Stockowners and Orchardists Association from 1922 until his death. In his final years, he was also a member of the Closer Settlement Board, a pastoralist representative on the State Employment Advisory Board, and an executive member of the Agricultural Bureau of Tasmania. He died at his home in New Town, Hobart in 1929 and was buried at Cornelian Bay Cemetery. The Mercury described Lyne as "one of the most successful wheatgrowers and graziers in Tasmania."
