= Tooms Lake =

- Town
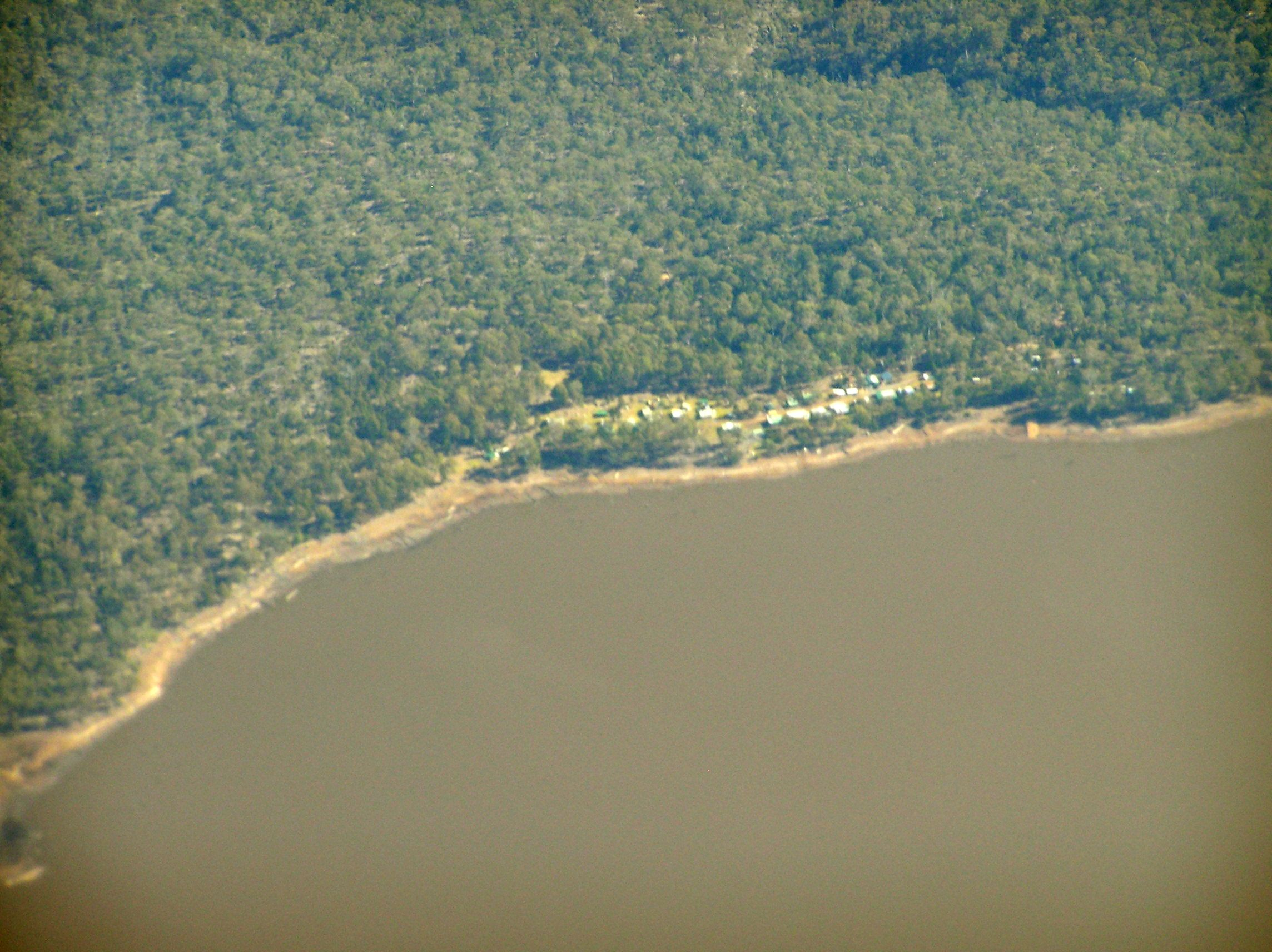
- Aerial photo from the east, the village is at the top of the lake

- Coordinates: 42°14′S 147°48′E
- Country: Australia
- State: Tasmania
- Region: Central, South-east
- LGA: Northern Midlands, Southern Midlands, Glamorgan-Spring Bay
- Location: 83 km (52 mi) N of Hobart; 47 km (29 mi) N of Triabunna

Government
  - State electorate: Lyons
  - Federal division: Lyons
- Elevation: 464 m (1,522 ft)

Population
  - Total: nil (2016 census)
- Postcode: 7209
Localities around Tooms Lake
Ross	Swansea	Swansea, Lake Leake
Lemont, Ross	Tooms Lake	Little Swanport
Lemont	Lemont	Triabunna

Tooms Lake is a rural locality and a lake in the local government areas (LGA) of Northern Midlands, Southern Midlands, and Glamorgan-Spring Bay in the Central and South-east LGA regions of Tasmania. The locality is about 47 kilometres (29 mi) north of the town of Triabunna. The 2016 census recorded a population of nil for the state suburb of Tooms Lake.

The lake is artificial and shallow, covering 6.6 km^{2} (2.5 sq mi).

The lake was once a wetland and was an Aboriginal meeting place. The indigenous name for this place was moyantaliah (moy.en.tel.eea).

The lake can hold 25.362 gigaliters of water. The catchment area is 60.2 km^{2}. It is drained by the Tooms River, which flows into the Macquarie River. The lake is reached by the gravel Tooms Lake Road, 83 km from Hobart. Seaplanes land on the lake several times per year.

The lake is used for recreational fishing, for brown and rainbow trout. Brown trout were introduced in 1904 and rainbow trout were released around 1908. Trout are usually 1 to 1 1/2 kg (2.2 to 3.3 lb) with the largest 2 1/2 kg (5.5 lb). Kuth Energy is drilling a geothermal energy exploration borehole in the area called Tooms1.

Other creatures found in Tooms Lake are Galaxias maculatus or jollytail.

== Amenities ==
Amenities include a camping ground, boat ramp, public toilet and rubbish bin. There are no shops or public phone service. The lake is 468 m above sea level.

Water flowing from the Tooms Lake has an average electrical conductivity of 74 μS/cm.

Tooms Lake
- Location within Tasmania

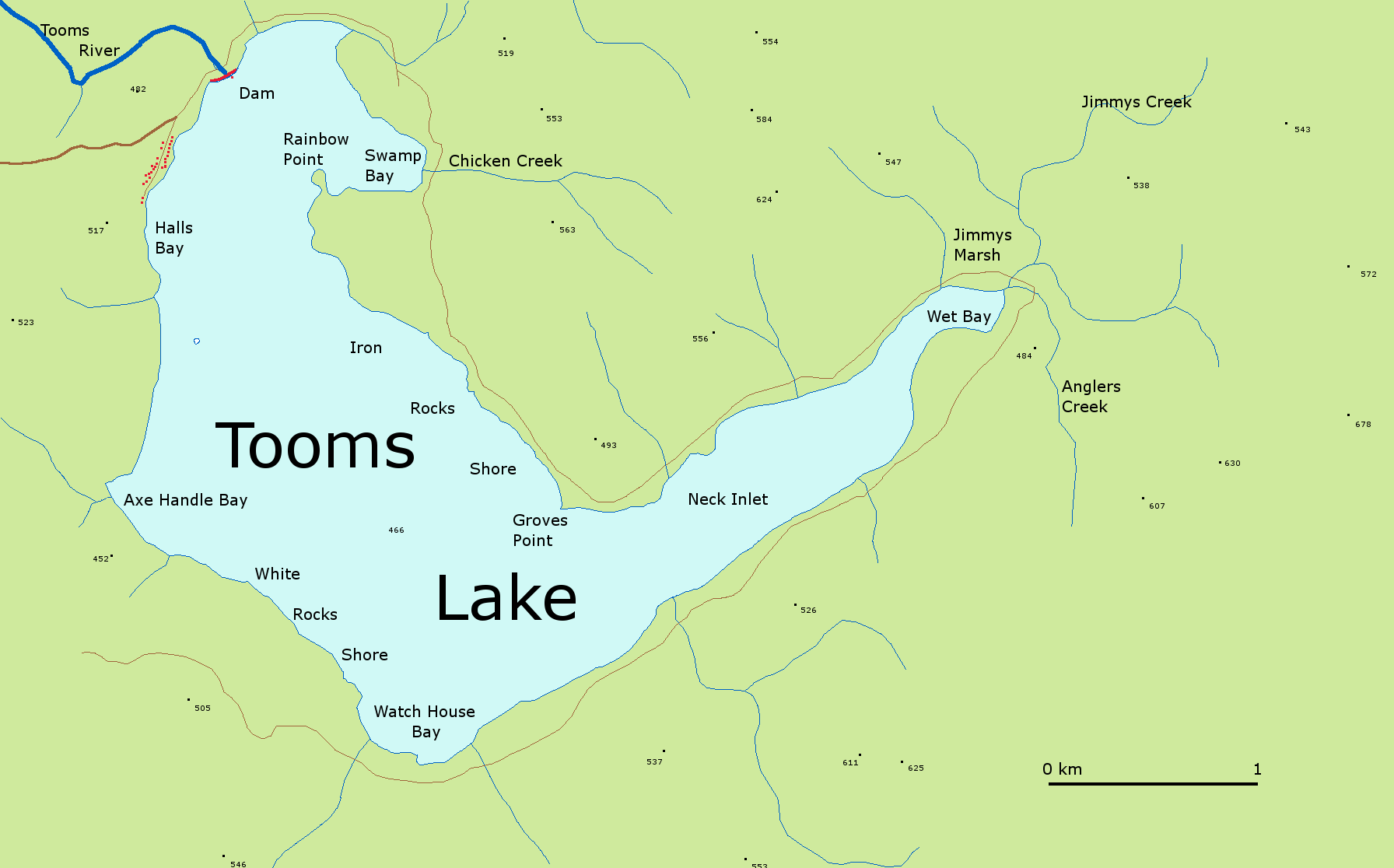
- map with settlement
- Location: Tasmania
- Coordinates: 42.232°S 147.796°E
- Lake type: reservoir
- Primary inflows: Jimmys Creek
- Primary outflows: Tooms River
- Catchment area: 60.2 km^{2} (23.2 sq mi)
- Basin countries: Australia
- Surface area: 6.6 km^{2} (2.5 sq mi)
- Water volume: 25.362 gigalitres (895,700,000 cu ft)
- Surface elevation: 468 m (1,535 ft)
- Frozen: no
- Islands: none

== History ==
On 6 December 1828 a massacre of Aboriginal Tasmanians occurred, in which ten were killed by nine soldiers from the 40th regiment. John Danvers, the guide of the group, reported to the Oatlands police magistrate:

One of them getting up from a small fire to a large one, discovered us and gave the alarm to the rest, and the whole of them jumpt [sic] up immediately and attempted to take up their spears in defence, and seeing that, we immediately fired and repeated it because we saw they were on the defensive part, they were about twenty in Number and several of whom were killed, two only were, unfortunately taken alive.

A woman and a boy were captured and the rest of the group escaped.

The dam on the lake was built by 40 men.

Tooms Lake is a confirmed locality.

== Geography ==
The Little Swanport River forms part of the southern boundary. The lake is fully contained within the locality.

== Resources ==
- Archives Office of Tasmania
