= Spring Beach, Tasmania =

Spring Beach Tasmania
- Coordinates: 42°35′53″S 147°53′54″E
- Population: 97 (2016 census)
- Postcode(s): 7190
- Location: 14 km (9 mi) S of Triabunna
- LGA(s): Glamorgan–Spring Bay
- Region: South-east
- State electorate(s): Lyons
- Federal division(s): Lyons
Localities around Spring Beach:
Orford	Orford	Orford
Orford	Spring Beach	Mercury Passage
Rheban	Rheban	Rheban

Spring Beach is a rural locality in the local government area (LGA) of Glamorgan–Spring Bay in the South-east LGA region of Tasmania. The locality is about 14 kilometres (8.7 mi) south of the town of Triabunna. The 2016 census recorded a population of 97 for the state suburb of Spring Beach.

== History ==
Spring Beach was gazetted as a locality in 1973.

== Geography ==
The eastern boundary follows the shoreline of Mercury Passage.

== Road infrastructure ==
Route C320 (Rheban Road) passes through from north-east to south-east.
