= Rheban =

- Town
- Coordinates: 42°41′14″S 147°52′09″E
- Country: Australia
- State: Tasmania
- Region: South-east
- LGA: Glamorgan–Spring Bay
- Location: 74 km (46 mi) S of Swansea

Government
  - State electorate: Lyons
  - Federal division: Lyons

Population
  - Total: 7 (2016 census)
- Postcode: 7190
Localities around Rheban
Buckland	Spring Beach, Orford	Tasman Sea
Buckland	Rheban	Tasman Sea
Kellevie	Bream Creek	Tasman Sea

Rheban is a rural locality in the local government area of Glamorgan–Spring Bay in the South-east region of Tasmania. It is located about 74 kilometres (46 mi) south of the town of Swansea. The 2016 census determined a population of 7 for the state suburb of Rheban.

== History ==
Rheban was gazetted as a locality in 1960, beside Carrickfergus Bay. The district was initially called 'Annaroe' after a property there. It was then named after an Irish castle called Rheban near Athy, County Kildare. Note the Tasmania Placenames reference is in error as Athy is 60 km inland from the sea and nowhere near Carrickfergus and Carrickfergus Bay (now known as Belfast Lough).

== Geography ==
The Tasman Sea forms the eastern boundary.

== Road infrastructure ==
The C320 route (Rheban Road) enters from the north-east and runs south and south-west to an intersection with Wielangta Road (no route number) where it ends.
