= Spikey Bridge =

Heritage bridge near Swansea, Tasmania

- Coordinates: 42.1866979°S 148.0647602°E
- Locale: Swansea, Tasmania
- Named for: The rock spikes on the brick railing

Characteristics
- Design: Causeway-like bridge design
- Material: Brick
- Total length: 50m
- Width: 8m
- No. of lanes: One

History
- Constructed by: Not recorded
- Construction start: 1843 or 1845
- Construction end: 1848
- Construction cost: Not recorded
- Opened: 1848

Location
- Interactive map of Spikey Bridge

The Spikey Bridge is a brick bridge near Swansea, Tasmania, crossing Lafarelles Gully.

The year is unknown when construction started for the bridge but it is likely to be 1843 or 1845 during the convict period. The name comes from the rocks that point out from the brick railings which was meant to prevent land animals like cattle or sheep from jumping or accidentally falling off the edge of the bridge.

== Description ==
The Spikey Bridge crosses Lafarelles Gully near Swansea consisting a grassy and dirt road on the bridge. The bridge is primarily made out of brick and rock with a small low tunnel for the water to flow straight through the causeway-like bridge. The railings are made out of brick and rock with spikes which are made from rocks which were used to prevent land animals like cattle and sheep from jumping or accidentally falling off the edge of the bridge.

== History ==
Its history of the year it was constructed remains unknown but is likely to be constructed in 1843 or 1845 which was than finished in 1848.

Sometime in the 1920s or 1960s, the bridge was bypassed by the Tasman Highway which the Spikey Bridge used to carry the Tasman Highway.

The bridge was registered as Heritage in the 1990s under Tasmania's Historic Cultural Heritage Act 1995.
