= Cheryl Arnol =

Australian politician

Councillor Cheryl Arnol

Mayor of Glamorgan–Spring Bay
- Incumbent
- Assumed office 25 October 2022
- Preceded by: Debbie Wisby

Deputy Mayor of Glamorgan Spring Bay
- In office 2014-2018

Councillor of Glamorgan-Spring Bay
- Incumbent
- Assumed office 1996

Personal details
- Party: Independent
- Other political affiliations: Shooters, Fishers and Farmers Party (2017); Country Alliance (2013)
- Education: Australian Institute of Company Directors
- Profession: Professional clay shooter
- Website: https://www.cherylarnol.com/

Cheryl Arnol is an Australian politician who has served as Mayor of Glamorgan–Spring Bay Council since 2022, and has previously served in that role from 1996, until 2006. Arnol was Deputy Mayor from 2014 to 2018, whilst Mayor Michael Kent was in office.

== Political career ==
=== First mayorship and resignation ===
Arnol was elected to the mayorship in 1999 and was subsequently re-elected into that role until her resignation in 2005. Arnol said she resigned due to repeated "abuse" from members of the community due to decisions she had made as mayor.

=== State and Federal election campaigns ===
Arnol ran for the Electoral division of Rumney in the 2017 Tasmanian Legislative Council periodic election for the Shooters, Fishers and Farmers Party. Arnol was unsuccessful in this run, receiving the second-last vote count, of 1,616 first-preference votes.

Arnol ran for the Australian Senate in 2013 for the Country Alliance. Arnol was unsuccessful, receiving 197 below-the-line votes.
