= Friendly Beaches =

- Town
- Coordinates: 41°59′31″S 148°15′05″E
- Country: Australia
- State: Tasmania
- Region: South-east
- LGA: Glamorgan–Spring Bay
- Location: 91 km (57 mi) NE of Swansea

Government
  - State electorate: Lyons
  - Federal division: Lyons
- Elevation: 55 m (180 ft)

Population
  - Total: 10 (2016 census)
- Postcode: 7215
- Mean max temp: 18.6 °C (65.5 °F)
- Mean min temp: 9.4 °C (48.9 °F)
- Annual rainfall: 673.2 mm (26.50 in)
Localities around Friendly Beaches
Apslawn	Bicheno	Tasman Sea
Coles Bay, Apslawn	Friendly Beaches	Tasman Sea
Coles Bay	Coles Bay	Tasman Sea

Friendly Beaches is a rural locality in the local government area of Glamorgan–Spring Bay in the South-east region of Tasmania. The locality is about 91 kilometres (57 mi) north-east of the town of Swansea. The 2016 census recorded a population of 10 for the state suburb of Friendly Beaches.

== History ==
Friendly Beaches is a confirmed suburb/locality.

== Geography ==
The eastern boundary of Friendly Beaches is the Tasman Sea. The Friendly Beaches Reserve is within the locality.

=== Climate ===
Friendly Beaches experiences an oceanic climate (Köppen: Cfb) with pleasant summers and quite cool winters. The wettest recorded day was 29 January 2016 with 138.2 mm (5.44 in) of rainfall. Extreme temperatures ranged from 41.9 °C (107.4 °F) on 30 December 2019 to −1.1 °C (30.0 °F) on 22 May 2008.

Climate data for Friendly Beaches (42.00°S 148.28°E) (55 m (180 ft) AMSL) (1997-2025)
Month	Jan	Feb	Mar	Apr	May	Jun	Jul	Aug	Sep	Oct	Nov	Dec	Year
Record high °C (°F)	40.0 (104.0)	38.6 (101.5)	37.0 (98.6)	31.4 (88.5)	24.0 (75.2)	21.0 (69.8)	19.7 (67.5)	23.5 (74.3)	28.7 (83.7)	33.6 (92.5)	35.8 (96.4)	41.9 (107.4)	41.9 (107.4)
Mean daily maximum °C (°F)	23.4 (74.1)	23.0 (73.4)	21.7 (71.1)	18.9 (66.0)	16.2 (61.2)	14.1 (57.4)	13.9 (57.0)	14.8 (58.6)	16.9 (62.4)	18.3 (64.9)	20.0 (68.0)	21.9 (71.4)	18.6 (65.5)
Mean daily minimum °C (°F)	13.4 (56.1)	13.2 (55.8)	12.2 (54.0)	9.9 (49.8)	8.1 (46.6)	6.3 (43.3)	5.7 (42.3)	6.2 (43.2)	7.4 (45.3)	8.6 (47.5)	10.3 (50.5)	11.8 (53.2)	9.4 (49.0)
Record low °C (°F)	6.0 (42.8)	6.6 (43.9)	5.3 (41.5)	1.0 (33.8)	−1.1 (30.0)	−0.7 (30.7)	−0.9 (30.4)	−0.9 (30.4)	−1.0 (30.2)	1.2 (34.2)	3.0 (37.4)	4.4 (39.9)	−1.1 (30.0)
Average precipitation mm (inches)	64.4 (2.54)	52.6 (2.07)	63.1 (2.48)	52.7 (2.07)	53.7 (2.11)	54.6 (2.15)	43.6 (1.72)	52.4 (2.06)	43.7 (1.72)	66.1 (2.60)	70.5 (2.78)	54.9 (2.16)	673.2 (26.50)
Average precipitation days (≥ 0.2 mm)	9.5	11.2	12.0	11.5	11.9	12.6	12.5	13.4	12.6	13.1	12.0	10.0	142.3
Average afternoon relative humidity (%)	58	60	58	62	64	67	64	59	57	57	59	55	60
Average dew point °C (°F)	11.5 (52.7)	12.3 (54.1)	10.9 (51.6)	9.0 (48.2)	7.4 (45.3)	6.3 (43.3)	5.4 (41.7)	5.1 (41.2)	5.8 (42.4)	6.9 (44.4)	8.9 (48.0)	9.5 (49.1)	8.3 (46.8)
Source: Bureau of Meteorology (1997-2025)

== Road infrastructure ==
The C302 route (Coles Bay Road) enters from the north-west and runs through to the south-west, where it exits.
