= Cranbrook, Tasmania =

Cranbrook
- Town
- Coordinates: 42°00′00″S 148°05′07″E
- Country: Australia
- State: Tasmania
- Region: Central east coast, Tasmania
- LGA: Glamorgan-Spring Bay
- Location: 20 km (12 mi) N of Swansea

Government
  - State electorate: Lyons
  - Federal division: Lyons

Population
  - Total: 67 (2016 census)
- Postcode: 7190
Localities around Cranbrook
Royal George	Royal George	Bicheno
Lake Leake	Cranbrook	Apslawn
Swansea	Dolphin Sands	Coles Bay

Cranbrook is a locality and small rural community in the local government area of Glamorgan-Spring Bay, in the Central east coast region of Tasmania. It is located about 20 kilometres (12 mi) north of the town of Swansea. The 2016 census determined a population of 67 for the state suburb of Cranbrook.

== History ==
The locality name is believed to be derived from a town in southern England, probably Cranbrook, Kent. That name was derived from Old English words for "a marsh (or brook) of cranes”.

== Viticulture ==
An emerging viticulture region has been established in Cranbrook, with many vineyards well established such as Gala Estate, Springvale Wines, Milton Vineyard, Craigie Knowe all with cellar doors and other established vineyards such as The Bend vineyard nearby. The region produces quality Pinot Noir, Chardonnay, Riesling's and other grape varieties, noting another 10 vineyards under development.

== Road infrastructure ==
The Tasman Highway passes through from south-west to north-east, and intersects with the C301 route (Old Coach Road) within the locality.

== Notable people ==
- Arthur Cotton, Australian politician
