= John Lyne =

Australian politician (1810–1900)

Member of the Tasmanian House of Assembly for Glamorgan
- In office 8 December 1880 – December 1893
- Preceded by: John Mitchell
- Succeeded by: Edward Miles

Personal details
- Born: 7 December 1810 London, England
- Died: 14 September 1900 (aged 89) Launceston, Tasmania, Australia
- Relations: William Lyne (son); Carmichael Lyne (son)
- Occupation: Pastoralist

John "Tiger" Lyne (7 December 1810 – 14 September 1900) was an Australian pastoralist and politician. He was a member of the Tasmanian House of Assembly from 1880 to 1893, representing the seat of Glamorgan. He farmed at Apslawn on Tasmania's east coast.

== Early life ==
Lyne was born on 7 December 1810 in London, England. He was the son of William Lyne and his wife Sarah, who arrived in Van Diemen's Land with their children in 1826.

Lyne was raised on his father's property at Apsley on Tasmania's east coast. In his memoirs he recalled frequent violent clashes with Aboriginal Tasmanians, including an 1828 attack where his sister was struck unconscious, and that "from the beginning of their settlement, the family, when outside, was always armed against attacks by either bushrangers or Aboriginal people and they mortared the outside of their hut against fire attack".

== Career ==
In about 1833, Lyne established his own property nearby named Apslawn. He was a long-serving member of the Glamorgan Municipal Council, including a period as warden (mayor) of the municipality. He was also a justice of the peace and a visiting magistrate for the gaol at Bicheno.

Lyne was elected to the Tasmanian House of Assembly at the 1880 election, winning the seat of Glamorgan. He retired at the 1893 election, aged 83. His retirement was attributed to his increasing deafness.

In 1886, Lyne led a successful campaign for a government bounty to be paid on the thylacine (Tasmanian tiger), which was instituted the following year. He attributed thousands of sheep deaths to the thylacine and compared it to the impact of dingos on mainland farmers.

== Personal life ==
In 1843, Lyne married Lillias Hume, with whom he had five children. His sons William and Carmichael Lyne were also members of parliament, with William becoming premier of New South Wales and an inaugural federal government minister.

Lyne was widowed around 1890 and remarried to Martha Murray. He died at his home in Launceston on 15 September 1900, aged 90.

Tasmanian House of Assembly
Preceded by John Mitchell	Member for Glamorgan; 1880–1893	Succeeded by Edward Miles
