= Apslawn, Tasmania =

Apslawn
- Town
- Coordinates: 41°58′57″S 148°08′33″E
- Country: Australia
- State: Tasmania
- Region: South-east
- LGA: Glamorgan–Spring Bay
- Location: 74 km (46 mi) N of Triabunna

Government
  - State electorate: Lyons
  - Federal division: Lyons

Population
  - Total: 15 (2021 census)
- Postcode: 7190
Localities around Apslawn
Cranbrook	Douglas-Apsley National Park	Douglas-Apsley
Cranbrook	Apslawn	Bicheno, Friendly Beaches
Moulting Lagoon	Moulting Lagoon	Moulting Lagoon

Apslawn is a rural locality in the local government area (LGA) of Glamorgan–Spring Bay in the South-east LGA region of Tasmania. The locality is about 74 kilometres (46 mi) north of the town of Triabunna. The 2021 census recorded a population of 15 for the state suburb of Apslawn.

== History ==
Apslawn is a confirmed locality. The name comes from a property established here by John Lyne about 1833.

Sir William Lyne, an Australian politician, came from this family.

== Geography ==
The southern boundary follows the centreline of Moulting Lagoon, an inlet of Great Oyster Bay.

== Road infrastructure ==
Route A3 (Tasman Highway) runs through from west to east.

== See also ==
- Moulting Lagoon Important Bird Area
