= Leonard Montague Harris =

Tasmania-born New Zealand cricketer

Leonard Harris
Personal information
- Full name: Leonard Montague Harris
- Born: 21 December 1855; Swansea, Van Diemen's Land, Australia
- Died: 27 April 1947 (aged 91); Durban, Natal, South Africa
- Batting: Left-handed
- Role: Batsman

Domestic team information
- Years: Team
- 1881/82–1887/88: Otago
- 1891/92–1893/94: Wellington

Career statistics
Competition	First-class
Matches	11
Runs scored	348
Batting average	17.40
100s/50s	0/2
Top score	63
Balls bowled	36
Wickets	1
Bowling average	24.00
5 wickets in innings	0
10 wickets in match	0
Best bowling	1/11
Catches/stumpings	19/–
- Source: CricketArchive, 15 September 2025

Leonard Montague Harris (21 December 1855 – 27 April 1947) was an Australian-born cricketer. He played first-class cricket in New Zealand for Otago and Wellington between the 1881–82 and 1893–94 seasons. Later he lived in South Africa.

Harris was born at Swansea in what was then still Van Diemen's Land in 1855. After moving to New Zealand he played club cricket for Dunedin Cricket Club. Considered a "fine left-handed batsman", he played a total of 11 first-class matches, nine for Otago between 1881–82 and 1887–88 and then two for Wellington, one in each of the 1891–92 and 1893–94 seasons. He scored 348 first-class runs, playing several innings for Otago which were later described as "excellent", and took a single wicket.

Harris was the first batsman in New Zealand first-class cricket to carry his bat: for Otago against the touring Tasmanian team in February 1884 he batted throughout the first innings to finish 41 not out in an innings total of 65. The next-highest individual score in the match was 11, and Otago won by eight wickets.

Professionally Harris was a flax merchant, working for Guthrie and Larnach in Dunedin before becoming the manager of the Wellington branch of AS Patterson. He was prosecuted under the bankruptcy act in 1900 but the case was dismissed. He established his own firm in Wellington in January the following year, but by November had moved to Durban in South Africa where he planned to import butter from New Zealand. He travelled to England in 1930, visiting Lord's to watch a Test match and by 1940 owned a set of buildings in Durban.

Harris married Anna Russell at her home in the Dunedin suburb of Ravensbourne in March 1892. He died at Durban in 1947, aged 91.
