= Michael Kent (businessman) =

Australian businessman (1942–2018)

Mayor Michael Kent AM JP
- Kent in 2017

Mayor of Glamorgan-Spring Bay
- In office 28 October 2014 – 30 October 2018
- Preceded by: Bertrand Cadart
- Succeeded by: Debbie Wisby

Councillor of Glamorgan-Spring Bay Council
- In office 28 October 2014 – 6 December 2018 (Note: Kent retained his seat as councillor after the 2018 election, narrowly missing his spot as mayor. As a result, he retained councillor status till his death on the 6th of December 2018.)
- Succeeded by: Keith Pyke (Note: Pyke succeeded Kent as councillor following Kent's death. Pyke ascended the role via recount and as such once Pyke resigned in 2020, Kent's 2018 ballot papers were used to conduct the following recount.)

Honorary Consul of the Chilean Republic
- In office 2001 – 6 December 2018

Personal details
- Born: 1 April 1942 Hobart, Tasmania
- Died: 6 December 2018 (aged 76) Hobart, Tasmania
- Party: Jacqui Lambie Network
- Spouse: Judith Anne Kent (m. 1981; died 2009)
- Children: 8, including Julie
- Parent(s): Cyril Kent (father); Eileen Kent (mother)
- Occupation: Politician; Businessman; Company director
- Awards: See § Awards

Michael John Kent AM, AOTY (1 April 1942 – 6 December 2018) was an Australian businessman, sports administrator, diplomat and politician, from Hobart, Tasmania. Kent was the Tasmanian recipient of the Australian of the Year in 2004, and also received the Member of the Order of Australia award in 1998.

He was general manager of Purity Supermarkets (later Woolworths) and spearheaded the campaign to legalise seven day trading hours in Tasmania.

He was chairman of the Tasmanian Football League, and in 1994 led the first serious bid for a Tasmanian team in the Australian Football League.

He owned various businesses throughout his life, however his latest ventures were The Gateway Cafe in Orford, Tasmania, and the Rusty Devil, a clothing and interiors business with stores formerly in Orford and Triabunna. A large rusty devil sculpture is still located outside the original store in Orford. The Rusty Devil was operated in collaboration with now-Clarence City independent councillor, Wendy Kennedy.

Kent also published his detailed autobiography, Open Slather, in 2015. Paul Lennon, former Premier of Tasmania issued a foreword in Kent's book in which he described his friendship and conduct with Kent regarding Lennon's role as a unionist and Kent's role as a supermarket executive.

== Political career ==
=== Glamorgan—Spring Bay Council ===
He was Mayor of the Glamorgan–Spring Bay Council from 2014 to 2018, being the first to win the position without any prior councillorship. Kent contested the 2018 council election, and as councillor he instantly received the quota to be elected on first preferences.

==== Council amalgamation campaign ====
During is mayoralty, Kent campaigned the council area to advocate for the amalgamations of councils in the region. In his book (Note: Open Slather. Published in 2015) he used an example wherein he commented on the fact that Brisbane City Council has a population of over one million, whilst Tasmania has around 500,000 people and 29 different councils. His main argument for amalgamations was because of the large number of councils that year-after-year are in budgetary-deficit and Kent proposed amalgamation to repair these issues. Towards the end of his mayor term, he brought forth a postal survey for the council ratepayers asking them their opinion on amalgamation, and listed five different options for amalgamation;

1. Extension of common arrangements between; Glamorgan-Spring Bay Council, Sorell Council, City of Clarence, Tasman Council
2. Full amalgamation of; Glamorgan-Spring Bay Council, Sorell Council, City of Clarence, Tasman Council
3. Amalgamation (without GSBC) of; Sorell Council, City of Clarence, Tasman Council
4. Amalgamation (without CoC) of; Sorell Council, Glamorgan–Spring Bay Council, Tasman Council
5. Amalgamation (without GSBC, CoC) of; Sorell Council, Tasman Council

As of 2024, no amalgamations have been made, yet talks are still going ahead through various councils of Tasmania, with the Government pledging not to force any amalgamation.

=== Tasmanian Parliament campaign – 2018 ===
In 2018, he run in the 2018 Tasmanian state election for the Jacqui Lambie Network in the division of Lyons. He was reported by various outlets as the 'star candidate' (Note: As described by newspaper, The Australian.) of the party although they usually refrain from announcing lead candidates and have not done so since. He received more first preference votes that any other JLN candidate across Tasmania, and in his own electorate of Lyons gained more votes than the other JLN candidates on the Lyons ticket combined. This was the first and only time this has happened in an election that the JLN have run in, and in the 2024 election wherein Lyons gained 2 extra members, the JLN elected member for the electorate was decided by a mere 50 votes.

== Honours and awards ==
=== Awards ===
==== Member of the Order of Australia ====
In 1998 at the Queen's Birthday Honours Ceremony in Tasmania, Kent received the honour of the Member of the Order of Australia (AM) for his "service to the community through support for charitable organisations and sporting bodies, and to business and retail industry associations."

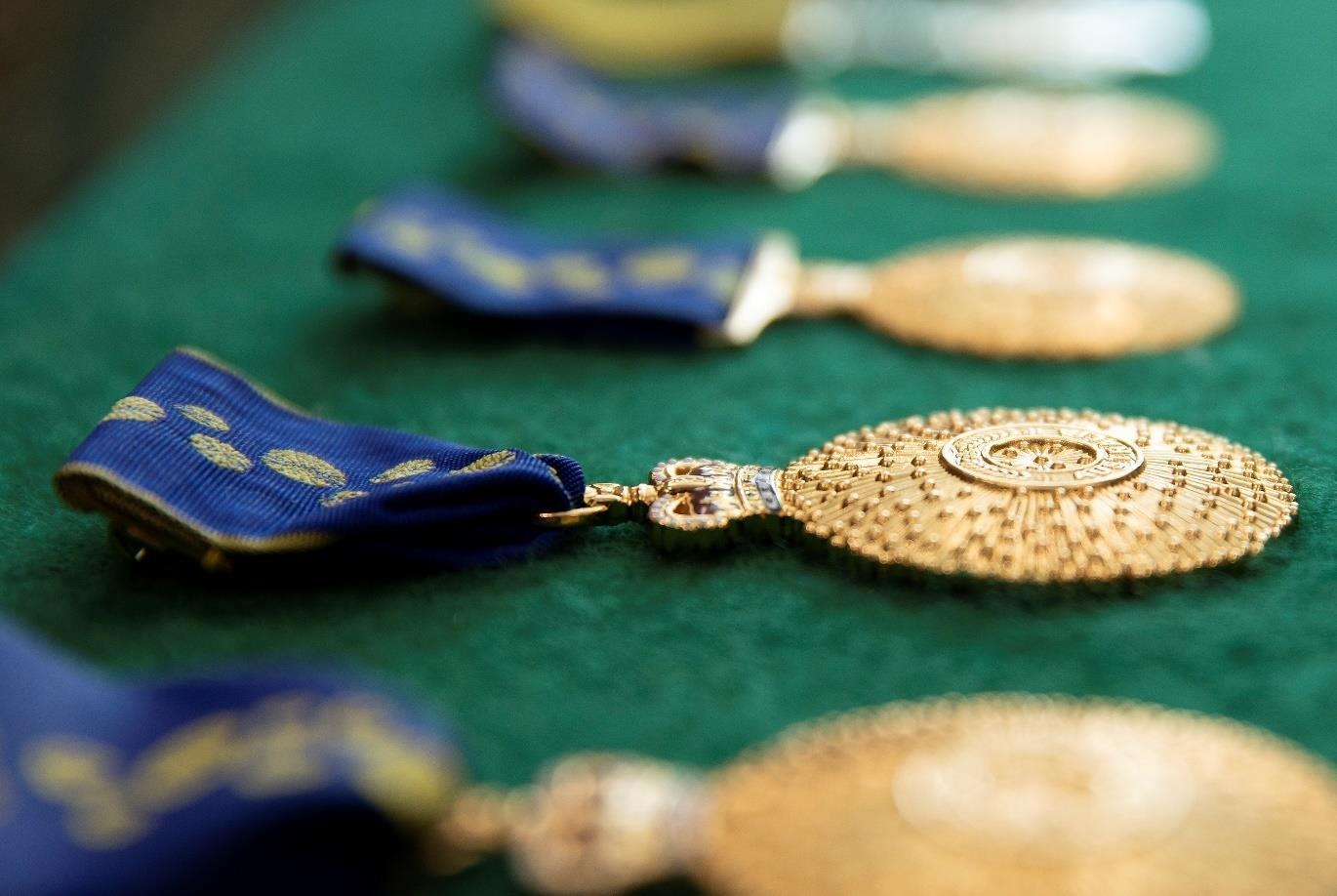
Order of Australia medals

==== Australian of the Year ====
In 2004, Kent was the Tasmanian recipient for the Australian of the Year award for "contributing significantly to Tasmanian business, economy, community, charity and sport" as well as for his directorship of the following organisations: Tasmania Together, RSPCA, Variety Club, the National Heritage Foundation, Tasplan Superannuation Fund (now SpiritSuper), Labour Union Co-operative Retirement Fund, Calvary Health Care, St Mary's Cathedral Restoration Committee and Hobart Aquatic Centre. They described Kent as "a mentor, leader and achiever who has given unconditionally to the betterment and success of the community."

==== Miscellaneous awards ====
Other awards received by Kent included:

- Gold Medal Award Australian Institute of Company Directors;
- Sovereign Order of St John of Jerusalem;
- Australian Centenary Medal;
- Australian Sports Medal;
- Tasmanian Marketer of the Year;
- Employer of the Year;
- Advance Australia Award;
- Paul Harris Fellow (Awarded Rotary Club of Kangaroo Bay); and
- Inaugural Joseph A. Lyons Award
