= Little Swanport =

- Town
- Coordinates: 42°20′26″S 147°56′17″E
- Country: Australia
- State: Tasmania
- Region: South-east
- LGA: Glamorgan–Spring Bay
- Location: 23 km (14 mi) N of Swansea

Government
  - State electorate: Lyons
  - Federal division: Lyons

Population
  - Total: 117 (2016 census)
- Postcode: 7190
Localities around Little Swanport
Tooms Lake	Rocky Hills	Tasman Sea
Tooms Lake, Swanston	Little Swanport	Tasman Sea
Buckland	Triabunna	Tasman Sea

Little Swanport is a rural locality and an estuary in the local government area of Glamorgan–Spring Bay in the South-east region of Tasmania. It is especially significant for the Little Swanport language. The locality is about 23 kilometres (14 mi) south of the town of Swansea. The 2016 census recorded a population of 117 for the state suburb of Little Swanport.

== History ==
Little Swanport is a confirmed suburb/locality. The indigenous name for the Little Swanport area was recorded by George Augustus Robinson in 1831 as meaning "place where a moving stream flows into a large estuary surrounded by hills".

The Little Swanport language was spoken by the Oyster Bay tribe of Aboriginal Tasmanians in the area.

== Geography ==
The eastern boundary of Little Swanport is the Tasman Sea. The locality surrounds the estuary of the Little Swanport River and the locality of Pontypool.

== Road infrastructure ==
The A3 route (Tasman Highway) enters from the south and runs through to the north-east.
