= Buckland, Tasmania =

Buckland
- Town
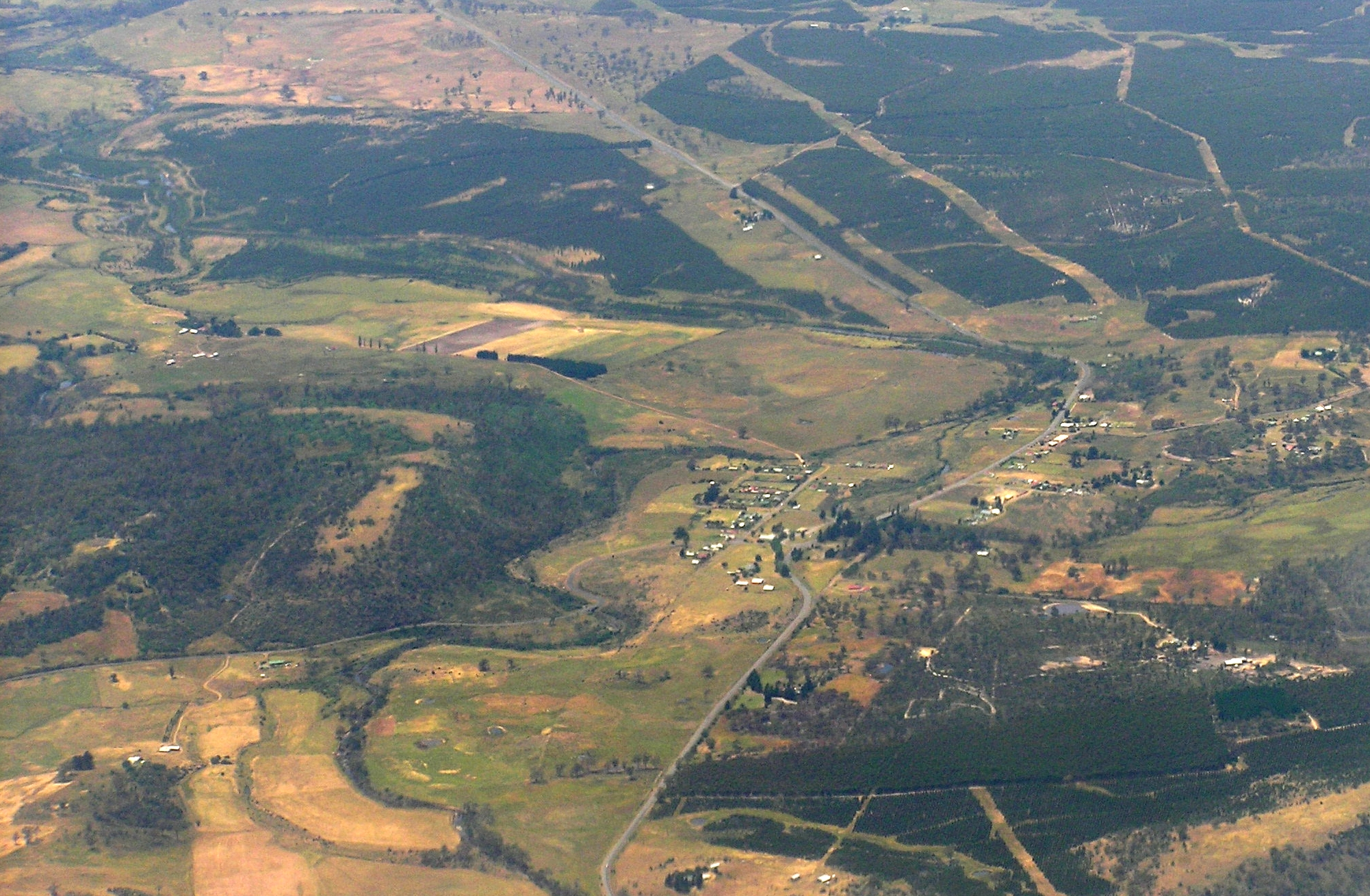
- Aerial view of Buckland from the west

- Coordinates: 42°36′39″S 147°42′25″E
- Country: Australia
- State: Tasmania
- Region: South-east
- LGA: Glamorgan–Spring Bay
- Location: 25 km (16 mi) SW of Triabunna

Government
  - State electorate: Lyons
  - Federal division: Lyons

Population
  - Total: 179 (2016 census)
- Postcode: 7190
Localities around Buckland
Swanston	Swanston	Little Swanport
Swanston, Stonehenge, Woodsdale, Levendale, Runnymede	Buckland	Triabunna, Orford, Rheban, Little Swanport
Pawleena	Nugent, Kellevie	Bream Creek

Buckland is a rural locality in the local government area (LGA) of Glamorgan–Spring Bay in the South-east LGA region of Tasmania. The locality is about 25 kilometres (16 mi) south-west of the town of Triabunna. The 2016 census recorded a population of 179 for the state suburb of Buckland. It is a village on the Tasman Highway. It contains a historic church, St John the Baptist church.

== History ==
The area around Buckland was originally settled around 1820. It was called the Prosser Plains as it was near the Prosser River. The oldest remaining house dates from 1826, and is called Woodsden. The village was renamed Buckland by Governor John Franklin in 1846, gaining its name from William Buckland, the Dean of Westminster. The Buckland Inn was built in 1841 and licensed in 1845.

Prosser's Plains Post Office opened on 19 October 1838, was renamed "Buckland" around 1884 and closed in 1981.

The St John the Baptist Church foundation stone was laid on 22 August 1846 by Fitzherbert Adams Marriott, the arch deacon of Hobart. The foundation stone has an inscription that reads: "That God may in this place be glorified, and the prayers and praises of the faithful continually offered until Christ shall come again". However the inscription is now on the inside of the wall.

On 19 June 2007 black ice caused numerous vehicle accidents in the Buckland area.

The Buckland timber mill operated from 1948 till 1981.

The area was formerly known as Prosser Plains. In 1846 it was renamed in honour of the renowned geologist and Dean of Westminster, William Buckland.

Buckland was gazetted as a locality in 1960.

== Geography ==
The Prosser River flows through from west to east after forming a small part of the western boundary.

== Road infrastructure ==
The Tasman Highway (Route A3) runs through from south-west to east. Route C318 (Buckland Road) starts at an intersection with A3 and runs north-west until it exits. Route C335 (Nugent Road) starts at an intersection with A3 and runs south until it exits.
