= Little Swanport language =

Aboriginal language of Tasmania

Little Swanport
- Region: region of Little Swanport, eastern Tasmania
- Ethnicity: Oyster Bay tribe of Tasmanians
- Extinct: 19th century
- Language family: Eastern Tasmanian: Oyster Bay; Little Swanport

Language codes
- ISO 639-3: None (mis)
- Glottolog: None oyst1235 (Oyster Bay + Little Swanport)
- AIATSIS: T15

Little Swanport Tasmanian is an Aboriginal language of Tasmania in the reconstruction of Claire Bowern. It was spoken near the modern town of Little Swanport on the east coast of Tasmania. Dixon & Crowley (1981) had noted that it appeared to be distinct, but were not sure if it constituted a separate language from other word lists collected near Oyster Bay. It is sometimes considered a dialect of Paredarerme (Oyster Bay).

The Little Swanport language is attested in a list of 211 words collected by George Augustus Robinson.
