= Australian Federation Party =

Right-wing political party in Australia

- Abbreviation: AFP; AFP
- Chairperson: Glenn O'Rourke
- Founder: CA/AFP: Russell Bate; Fiona Hilton-Wood; Russell Pearson; Bob Richardson; ToP: Nick Duffield
- Founded: CA/AFP: Mid-2004; 22 years ago ToP: 23 August 2021; 5 years ago
- Registered: CA/AFP: VEC: 16 August 2005; 21 years ago; AEC: 26 July 2011; 15 years ago; ToP: AEC: 3 December 2024; 23 months ago
- Preceded by: Trumpet of Patriots; United Australia Party (Note: Both parties were led and funded by Clive Palmer. While there is no legal succession between the two parties, some regard Trumpet of Patriots as the successor to the United Australia Party.)
- Membership (2022): ▲2,650
- Ideology: Trumpism; Conservatism; Right-wing populism
- Political position: Right-wing to far-right
- Colours: Gold Navy
- Slogan: Stand Together
- House of Representatives: 0 / 150
- Senate: 0 / 76

Website
- australianfederationparty.com.au

Australian Federation Party (AFP), formerly Trumpet of Patriots (TOP), is a right-wing populist political party in Australia. It is registered with the Australian Electoral Commission (AEC), as well as in New South Wales for local government elections and the Northern Territory for parliamentary elections. The party registrations in New South Wales and the Northern Territory are also in the name of Australian Federation Party in line with the party's constitution.

The party has its origins in the Country Alliance, which was founded in 2004 by four rural Victorians and renamed to the Australian Country Party (ACP) in 2015. In 2020, the ACP changed its name to the Australian Federation Party (AFP), also known as AusFeds. Trumpet of Patriots was formed in 2021 but was unable to achieve AEC registration on its own, and it merged with the Australian Federation Party in 2024.

In February 2025, the billionaire Clive Palmer, founder and chairman of the United Australia Party (UAP), funded Trumpet of Patriots' campaign by agreement with the TOP federal executive, after he was unable to re-register the UAP for the 2025 federal election. Palmer was announced as the TOP's campaign chairman for the campaign (although he was not legally party chairman), while Suellen Wrightson was announced as the party's political leader and unsuccessfully contested the electorate of Hunter.

In May 2025, Clive Palmer tried to voluntarily deregister the party. In September 2025, the AEC ruled that the party constitution of January 2024 was the valid one and the original party executives, including Glenn O'Rourke (chairman and registered officer) controlled Trumpet of Patriots.

On 27 January 2026, the Australian Electoral Commission advertised an application for the name change of Trumpet of Patriots to the former party name of Australian Federation Party. On 16 March 2026 the Australian Electoral Commission confirmed the return of the party name to Australian Federation Party (AFP).

== History ==
=== Country Alliance (2004–2015) ===
Country Alliance was founded in mid-2004 by four Victorians − Fiona Hilton-Wood, a staffer for independent MP Russell Savage; Russell Bate, a Shire of Mansfield councillor; Russell Pearson, a member of the Sporting Shooters Association; and Bob Richardson, a former union official. Savage said he had discussions with the party about joining, but ultimately chose to continue sitting as an independent.

At the 2006 Victorian state election, the party contested the three rural upper house regions, receiving 13,329 first preference votes and finishing in ninth place statewide. In the Western Victoria Region, preferences from the Country Alliance and the Labor Party flowed to the Democratic Labor Party (DLP) through group voting tickets, resulting in DLP lead candidate Peter Kavanagh winning the region's fifth and final seat.

Country Alliance nominated 37 candidates for the 2010 state election, standing in four upper house seats − Western Victoria, Eastern Victoria, Northern Victoria and Northern Metropolitan − and most of the regional seats in the lower house. The party's best lower house result was in Shepparton, where it polled 20.5% of first preferences and 39.8% of the two-candidate-preferred vote after preferences. In Northern Victoria, the party was initially projected by the ABC to win the final seat after polling 6.8% of the primary vote, but it fell approximately 1,900 votes short.

After being registered with the Australian Electoral Commission (AEC) in 2011, the party contested the 2013 federal election in several Victorian lower house seats, as well as fielding Senate candidates in South Australia, Tasmania and Victoria. The party received a total of 6,440 votes in the Senate, accounting for 0.05% of all votes cast nationwide.

In February 2014, the Victorian branch of Katter's Australian Party (KAP) merged with Country Alliance, with the newly-combined party contesting the 2014 state election as the Australian Country Alliance (ACA). At the election, the ACA received 1.28% of the vote in the lower house and 0.68% in the upper house statewide.

=== Australian Country Party (2015–2020) ===
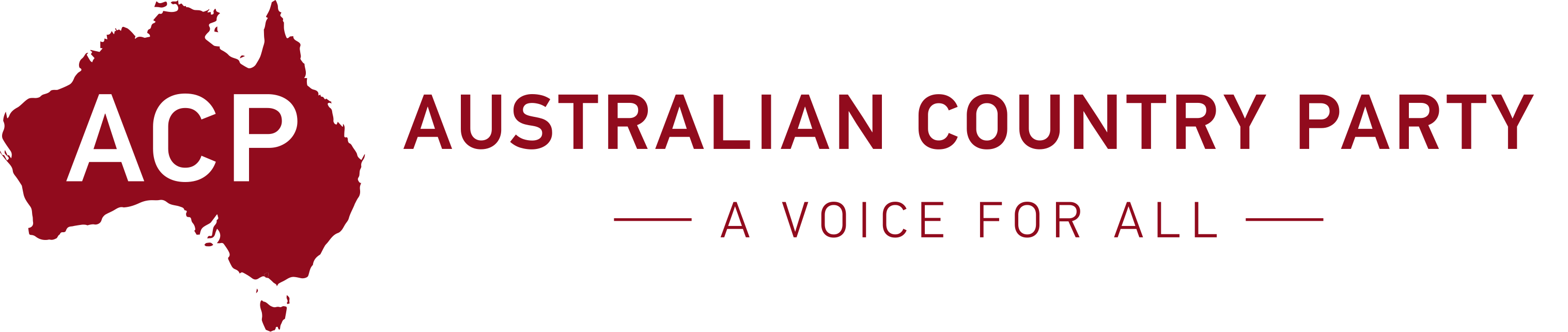
Logo of the Australian Country Party

In 2015, the party announced it would change its name to the Australian Country Party (ACP). The change was approved by the Victorian Electoral Commission (VEC) on 21 August 2015, and later approved for federal elections by the AEC on 23 October 2015. In response, the Victorian National Party sought to change its name to the "National Country Party" (the name that the federal National Party used from 1975 until 1982), but its application was rejected by the VEC.

In August 2018, the party applied to the AEC to change its name to the Australia Party/Give it Back, but withdrew the application before processing was completed. In September 2018, the VEC approved a similar application and the party was registered as the Australian Country Party/Give It Back, although the party applied to revert the change in January 2019.

=== Australian Federation Party (2020–2024) ===
In January 2020, the party changed its name to the Australian Federation Party (AFP). One month later on 4 March 2020, Tasmanians 4 Tasmania, a minor party that had contested the 2018 Tasmanian state election, was formally renamed to Federation Party Tasmania.

On 30 June 2020, an application to register Federation Party Australian Capital Territory was lodged with the ACT Electoral Commission. At the ACT election in October, the party had 0.26% of the overall vote. The party also applied for registration with the New South Wales Electoral Commission (NSWEC) to contest local government elections, although it did not run in the 2021 local elections.

At the 2022 federal election, the Australian Federation Party received 0.39% of the nationwide lower house vote and 0.22% of the upper house vote. One candidate was referred to the Australian Federal Police after it was discovered he was simultaneously as a candidate for One Nation. The national director at the time was South Australian perennial candidate Mark Aldridge.

=== Trumpet of Patriots (2024–2026) ===
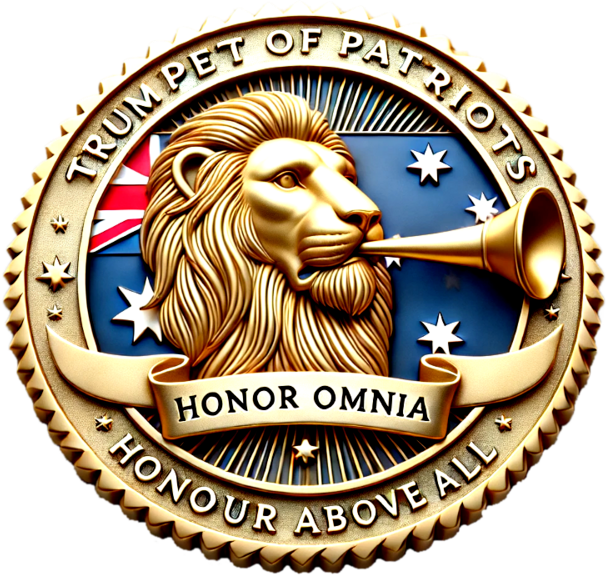
Logo (AI-generated) of the Trumpet of Patriots party

Trumpet of Patriots (TOP) was formed on 23 August 2021 by South Australian management consultant Nick Duffield, who served as its inaugural president. The party applied for registration with the AEC on 23 December 2021, but the party registration process was suspended on 11 April 2022 after the writ for the 2022 federal election was issued.

Because it could not contest the election as a registered party, it entered into an agreement with the Australian Federation Party, with many candidates who had intended to contest for Trumpet of Patriots instead running for the AFP. Following the federal election, the AEC refused the party's request for registration as it did not have 1,500 members required for registration.

On 26 August 2024, the Australian Federation Party applied to change its name federally with the AEC to "Trumpet of Patriots" as part of a merger between the two parties. The name change (an intentional allusion to Donald Trump) was approved by the AEC on 3 December 2024.

==== Clive Palmer ====
At a press conference on 19 February 2025, former federal MP Clive Palmer announced that he had joined, and was now Chairman of Trumpet of Patriots (Campaign Chairman not legally Party chairman), following the High Court ruling that he would be unable to register the United Australia Party (UAP) for the 2025 federal election after its voluntary de-registration in 2022. Suellen Wrightson, a former UAP candidate, was announced as the party's political leader and "prime ministerial candidate" in the Division of Hunter. The only sitting UAP representative, Victorian senator Ralph Babet, chose to remain as UAP leader and did not join Trumpet of Patriots.

Trumpet of Patriots failed to pick up any lower house seats in the election, receiving a total of 296,076 preference votes (1.91%). Wrightson finished a distant sixth in Hunter, polling 3.6%. She congratulated Prime Minister Anthony Albanese on Labor securing another victory, writing on her X account: "The Australian people have spoken." Subsequently, Wrightson shut down all her social media accounts. In the Senate election, the party also failed to secure representation, taking 2.6% of first-preferences.

=== Rebrand to AFP ===
On 16 March 2026, the party changed its name back to Australian Federation Party (AFP).

== Controversies ==
Several candidates nominated by the Trumpet of Patriots party have come under scrutiny following revelations of past controversies and criminal convictions, sparking questions about the party's candidate vetting standards.

In the Division of Reid, New South Wales, the party nominated David Sarikaya, who had claimed to hold a doctorate in psychology. However, an investigation by the NSW Health Care Complaints Commission revealed that his doctorate came from an American, online, non-accredited institution called "The American College of Metaphysical Theology (ACMT)". His doctorate was in theology, unrelated to counselling or psychology practice, and the degree certificate was purchased online in 2009 for around $249. The HCCC launched an investigation in 2016 and found that he had been continuously misleading the public for years, posing as a mental health professional without any formal qualifications in psychology or counselling. In 2018, the New South Wales Civil and Administrative Tribunal issued an order permanently prohibiting him from providing any paid or voluntary healthcare services. He was also convicted of fraud in Victoria in 1997 and later declared bankrupt.

In Queensland, the party's candidate for the division of Dickson, Michael Norman Jessop, also attracted attention. Jessop was arrested in July 2024 outside a residence on the Sunshine Coast after police were called about suspicious behaviour. Police found camouflage clothing, weapons, rope, tape, a shovel, an axe, and a body bag in his car. Jessop is currently out on bail awaiting trial for charges including stalking and possession of weapons.

Another Queensland candidate, Gabrial Pennicott, who contested the division of Wide Bay, was declared bankrupt and imprisoned in 2011 after being involved in 23 counts of fraud.

In the weeks leading up to the 2025 Federal Election, unsolicited text messages were sent out to voters from the Trumpet of Patriots' lead Senate candidate for Queensland, Harry Fong. This caused wide outrage and calls for election reform to outlaw spamming voters, and contributed to the resignation of South Australian Trumpet of Patriots candidate Mark Aldridge days before the election.

== Elected representatives ==
=== Former ===
As Country Alliance, Australian Country Party or Australian Federation Party representatives:

- Glamorgan–Spring Bay Council
  - Cheryl Arnol (2013)
- Mansfield Shire Council
  - Russell Bate (2012–2016)
- Moyne Shire Council
  - Jim Doukas (2015–2018)
- Greater Bendigo City Council
  - Elise Chapman (2014)
- Greater Geelong City Council
  - Jock Irvine (2014)
- Alice Springs Town Council
  - Marli Banks (2019–2020)
  - Eli Melky (2019–2020)
  - Catherine Satour (2019–2020)
