= Orford, Tasmania =

Orford
- Town
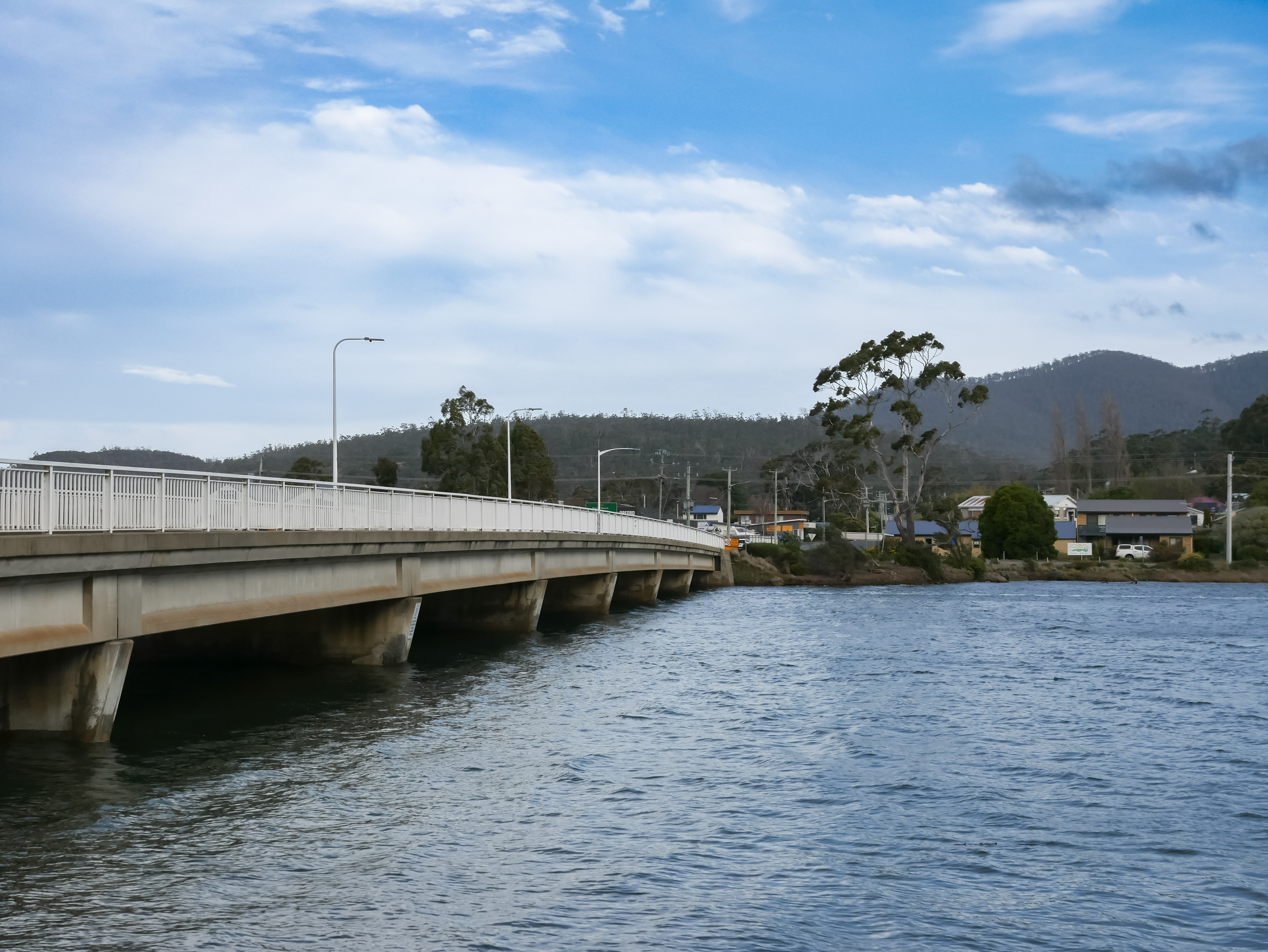
- Orford Bridge and Prosser River

- Coordinates: 42°33′S 147°52′E
- Country: Australia
- State: Tasmania
- LGA: Glamorgan Spring Bay Council
- Location: 6 km (3.7 mi) from Triabunna; 53 km (33 mi) from Sorell; 56 km (35 mi) from Swansea; 78 km (48 mi) from Hobart

Government
  - State electorate: Lyons
  - Federal division: Lyons

Population
  - Total: 685 (2021 census)
- Postcode: 7190

Orford is a seaside village located on the east coast of Tasmania, Australia, approximately 73 kilometres (45 mi) north-east of the state-capital of Hobart. Situated on Paredarerme pungenna country, and nestled around the mouth of the Prosser River, the village sits on the southern edge of Prosser Bay, with the Mercury Passage stretching out beyond the bay’s waters. At the 2021 census, Orford had a population of 685, though the population swells significantly during holiday periods.

Orford is serviced by one supermarket, three cafes and eateries, a hotel and other accommodation, police and fire brigade, a primary school, and a library.

== History ==
The Orford area was originally inhabited by the Paredarerme, or Oyster Bay tribe, one of the largest Aboriginal groups in Tasmania. They followed a seasonal migration pattern, moving inland during warmer months and returning to the coast during autumn and winter to fish and gather resources.

In 1808, convict Thomas Prosser escaped and was recaptured near the area, which led to the naming of the Prosser River and Prosser Bay. European settlement in the area grew in the 1820s, with a whaling station and a small garrison established along the bay to support the convict station on nearby Maria Island.

In 1830, Lieutenant-Governor George Arthur launched the Black Line, a military campaign intended to capture the local Aboriginal population. The effort, led by Edward Walpole, resulted in the capture of only two Aboriginal individuals. As a reward for his involvement, Walpole was granted 1,000 acres (400 ha) in 1831, which he named Strawberry Hill after his relative Horace Walpole's estate in London. Though Walpole soon sold the land, the town retained the name "Orford" in reference to his family's noble title.

Orford's early settlers were primarily engaged in farming, fishing, and timber work. However, the town's geography limited its growth as a port, with the sandbank at the mouth of the Prosser River preventing large vessels from entering. The road south of the town, known sarcastically as "Paradise Gorge", was notorious for its poor condition and was widely considered the worst in the colony.

In the 1840s, convicts began constructing the Convict Road along the northern side of Paradise Gorge. The Paradise Probation Station was established during this time but was abandoned within a few years, and it was later destroyed in a bushfire in 1856. Visitors can still walk sections of the convict-built road today, which leads to the ruins of the probation station.

In 1866, the first bridge across the Prosser River was constructed, overseen by Charles Meredith, the Colonial Treasurer and Minister for Lands and Works. His wife, Louisa Anne Meredith, a writer and artist, also resided in Orford, and their home, "Malunnah", still stands today as a historical landmark.

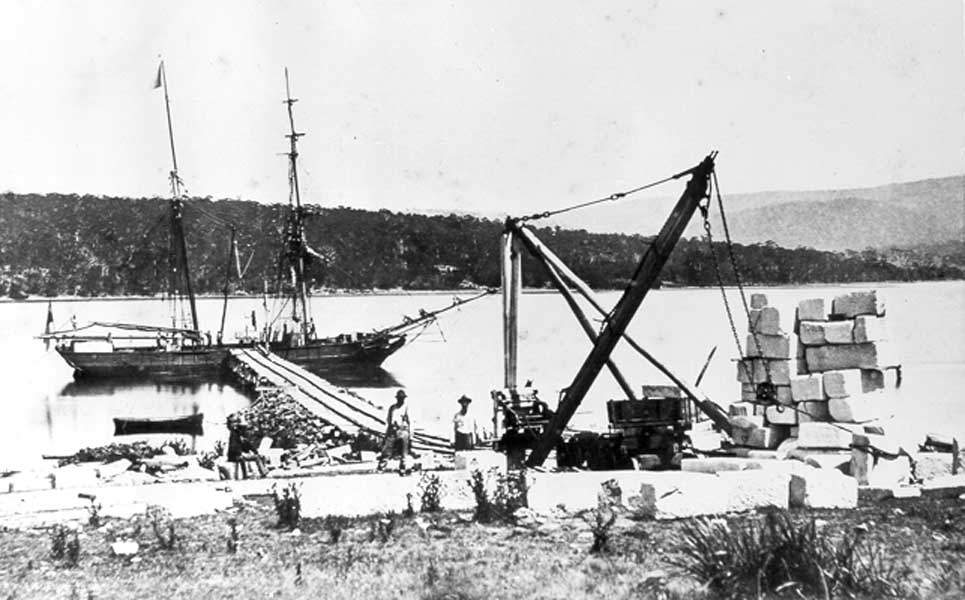
Loading stone at Oakhampton jetty

Founded by Stephen Crabtree, the Spring Bay Quarry near Strawberry Hill was operational from the late 1860s and provided sandstone for key Victorian buildings including the Supreme Court of Victoria, Melbourne Town Hall and the Melbourne General Post Office. After the quarry closed in 1882, Orford became increasingly popular as a holiday destination, with its beaches, bushwalking trails, and fishing spots attracting visitors. Raspins Beach and Thumbs Lookout in Wielangta Forest are particularly popular for outdoor activities today, continuing Orford’s tradition as a sought-after coastal getaway.

== Economy ==
Orford’s economy today is largely driven by tourism, real estate, and small-scale agriculture. The village serves as a popular vacation destination for both Tasmanians and mainland Australians, with a growing number of non-resident property owners investing in holiday homes ('shacks') in the area. This trend has caused a marked increase in real estate activity, particularly in waterfront properties and land near Spring Beach.

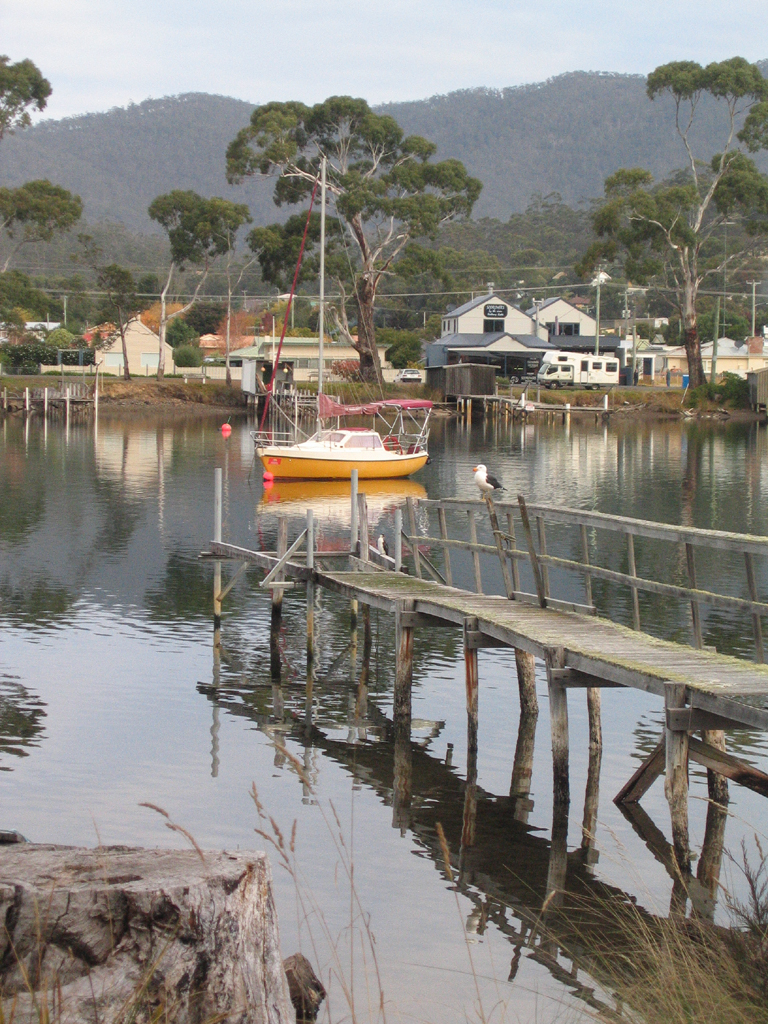
Boats on the Prosser River

During the summer months, the influx of visitors boosts the local economy. Businesses, including accommodation providers, cafes, and eateries, rely heavily on the tourism sector. The construction industry has also benefited from recent developments, such as the Okehampton Bay pipeline project and a recently upgraded sewer system.

Additionally, the fishing industry continues to play a role in Orford’s economy, with local waters providing sought-after species such as flathead, trevally, abalone, and southern rock lobster (crayfish).

=== Tourism ===
Orford is renowned for its picturesque beaches, including Raspins Beach, Millingtons Beach, Spring Beach, and Rheban Beach. The clear waters and sandy shores attract holidaymakers, particularly during the summer months. Raspins Beach also has a well-established campsite, which is popular with families and tourists. The area is known for its excellent fishing opportunities, with both recreational and competitive fishing drawing enthusiasts to Prosser Bay and the Mercury Passage. Species like flathead, trumpeter, and lobster are common catches, making the region a haven for anglers.

Orford’s scenic landscapes offer numerous walking trails, such as the Convict Trail along the Prosser River and the coastal walks between East Shelly Beach and Spring Beach. The nearby Thumbs Lookout in the Wielangta Forest provides panoramic views of the region and Maria Island. Sanda House, the oldest house in Orford, operates as a bed and breakfast, offering visitors a taste of local history.

The village is also home to a well-regarded 9-hole golf course and the Darlington Vineyard, which adds to the area's appeal for visitors seeking leisure and recreation.

In 2007, Orford further cemented its reputation as a prime scuba diving destination with the creation of an artificial reef and dive site from the scuttling of the ship Troy D in the Mercury Passage. The area’s unpolluted waters and abundant marine life make it a popular spot for divers from around the world.

Orford and surrounds
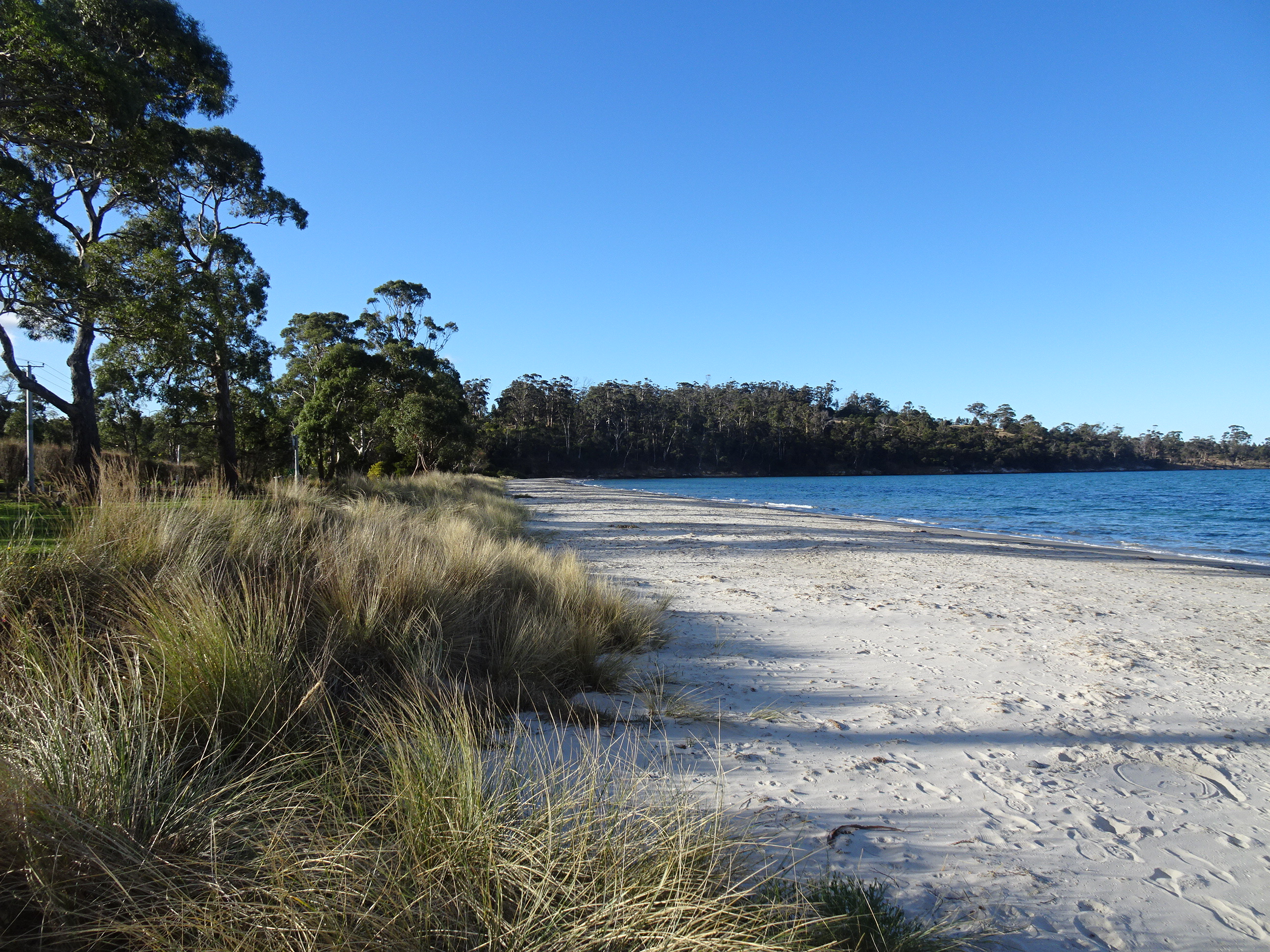
Spring Beach

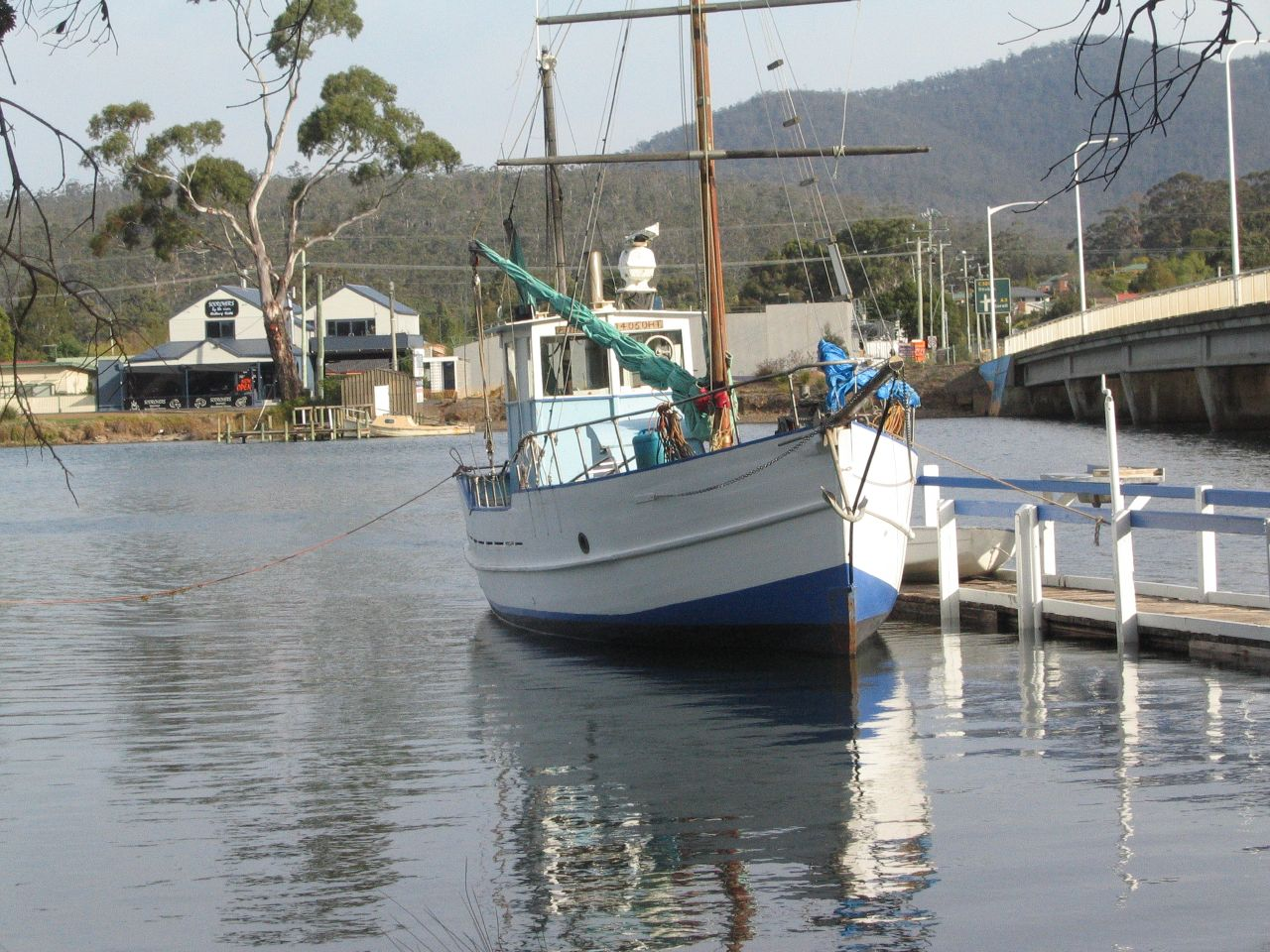
Boats on Prosser River

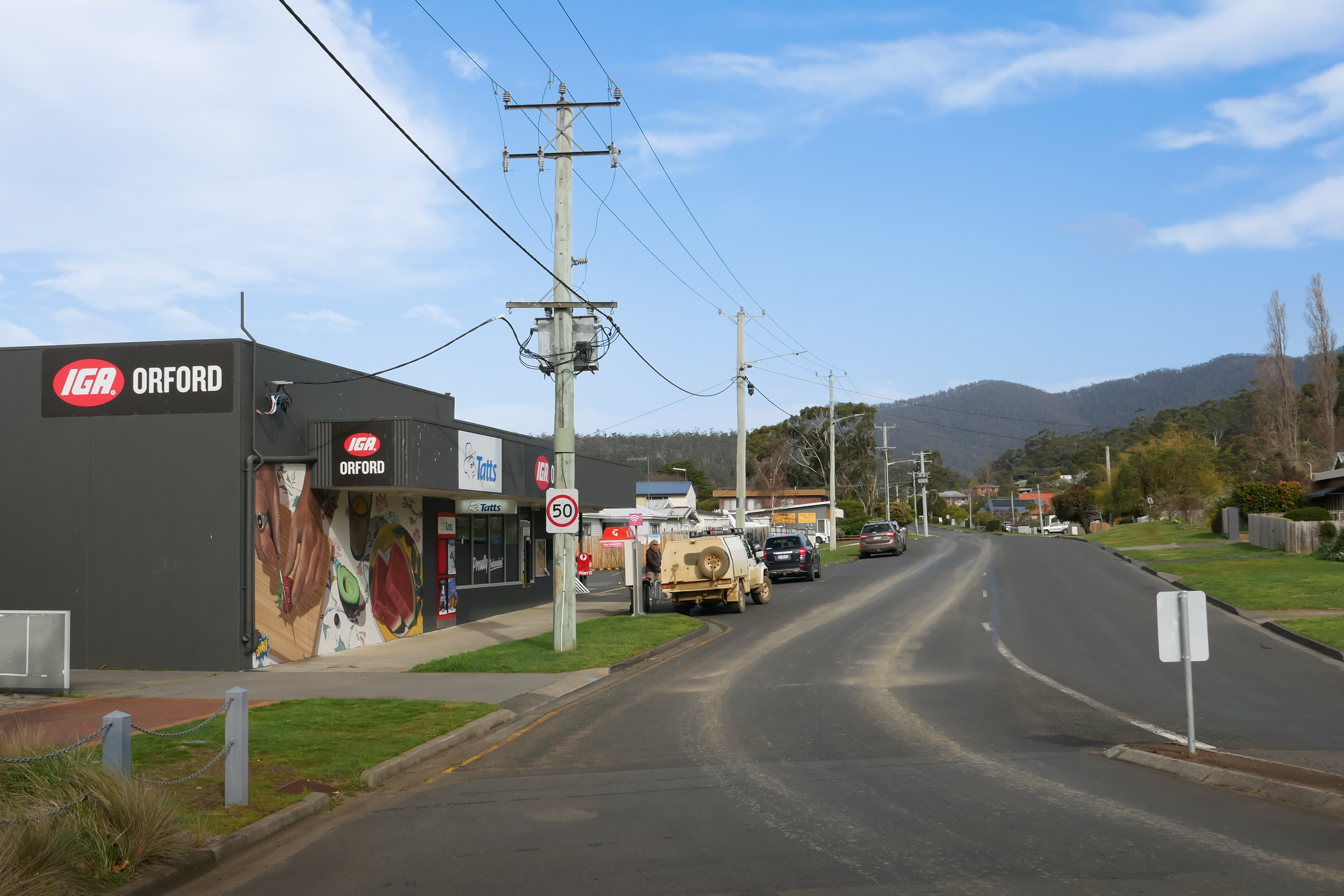
Shops at Orford

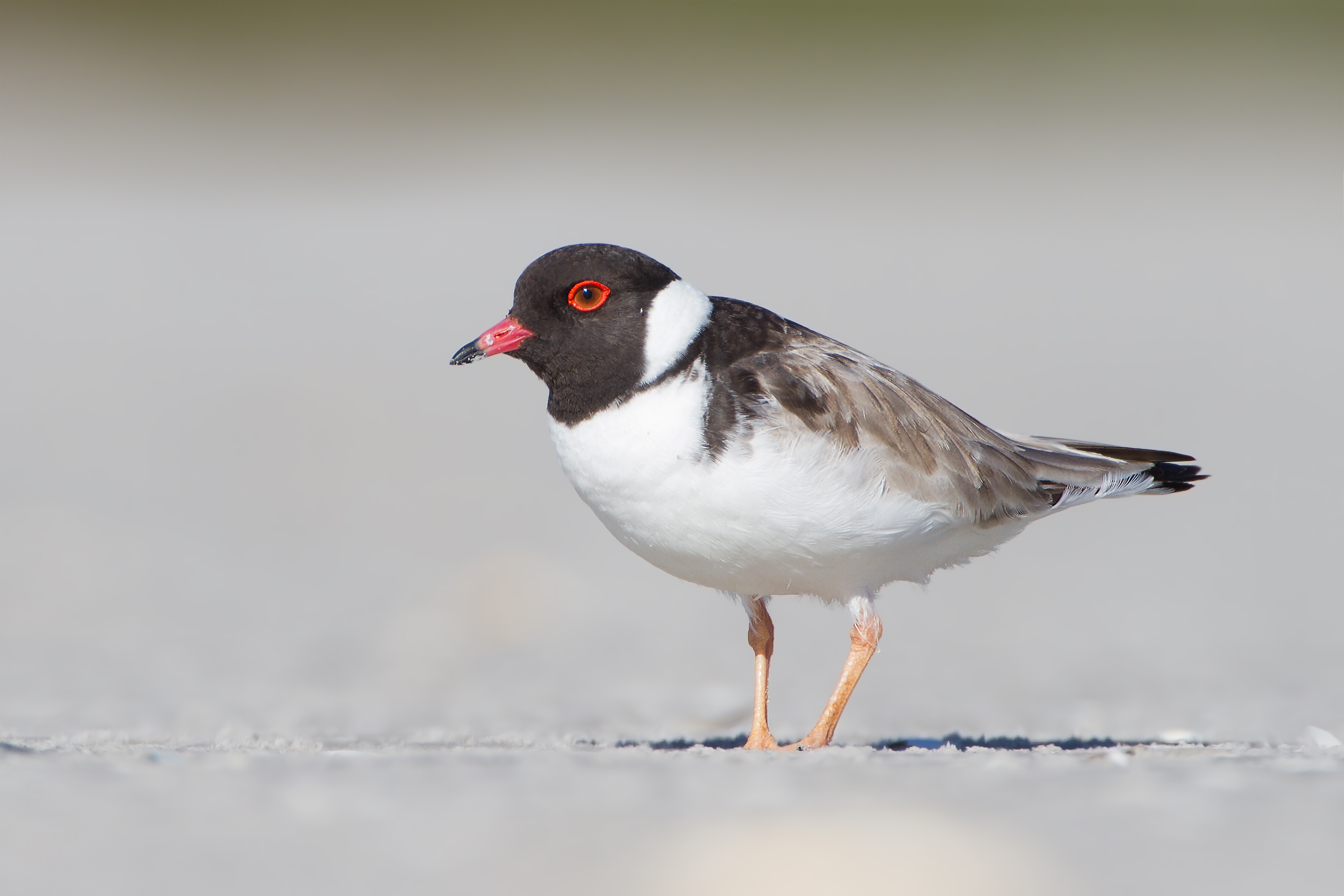
Thinornis rubricollis

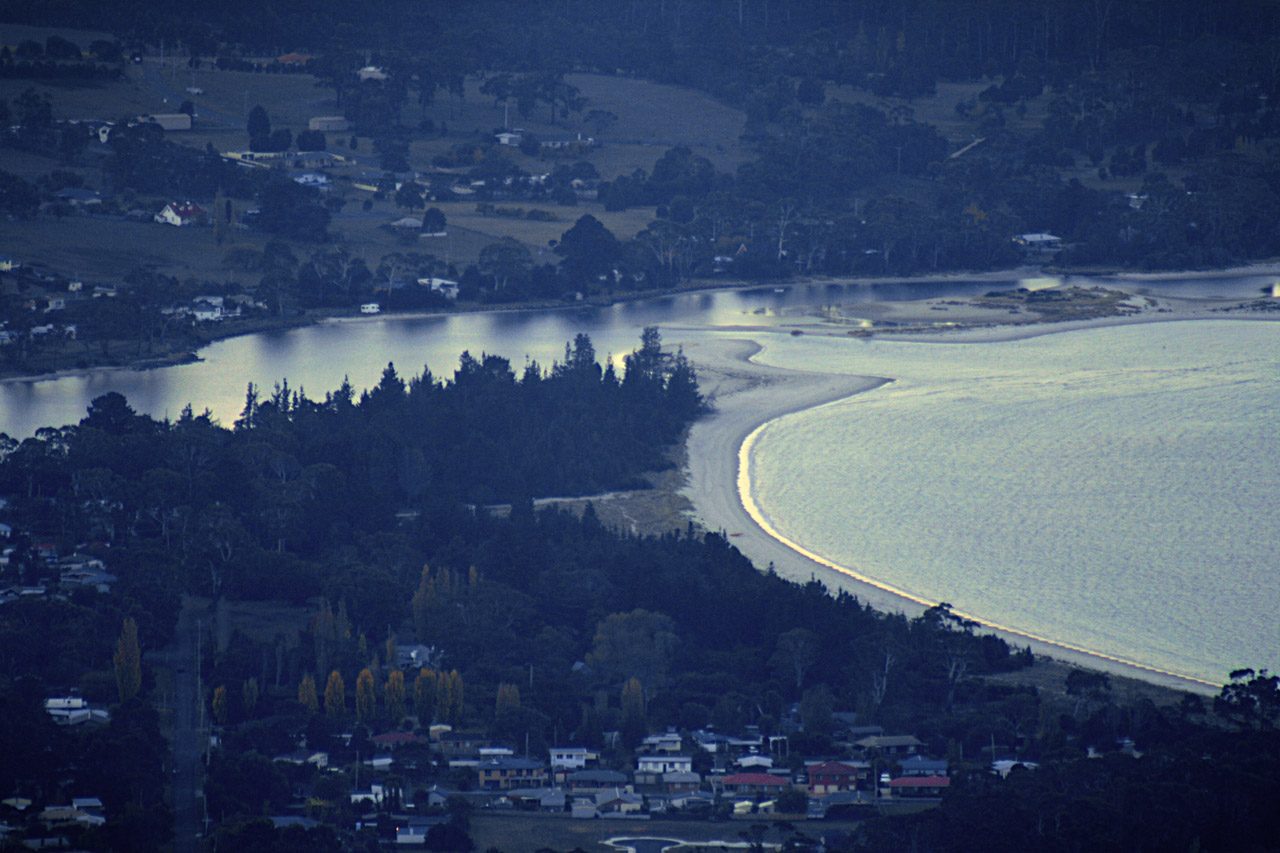
Aerial at dusk, 2009

== Real estate and development ==
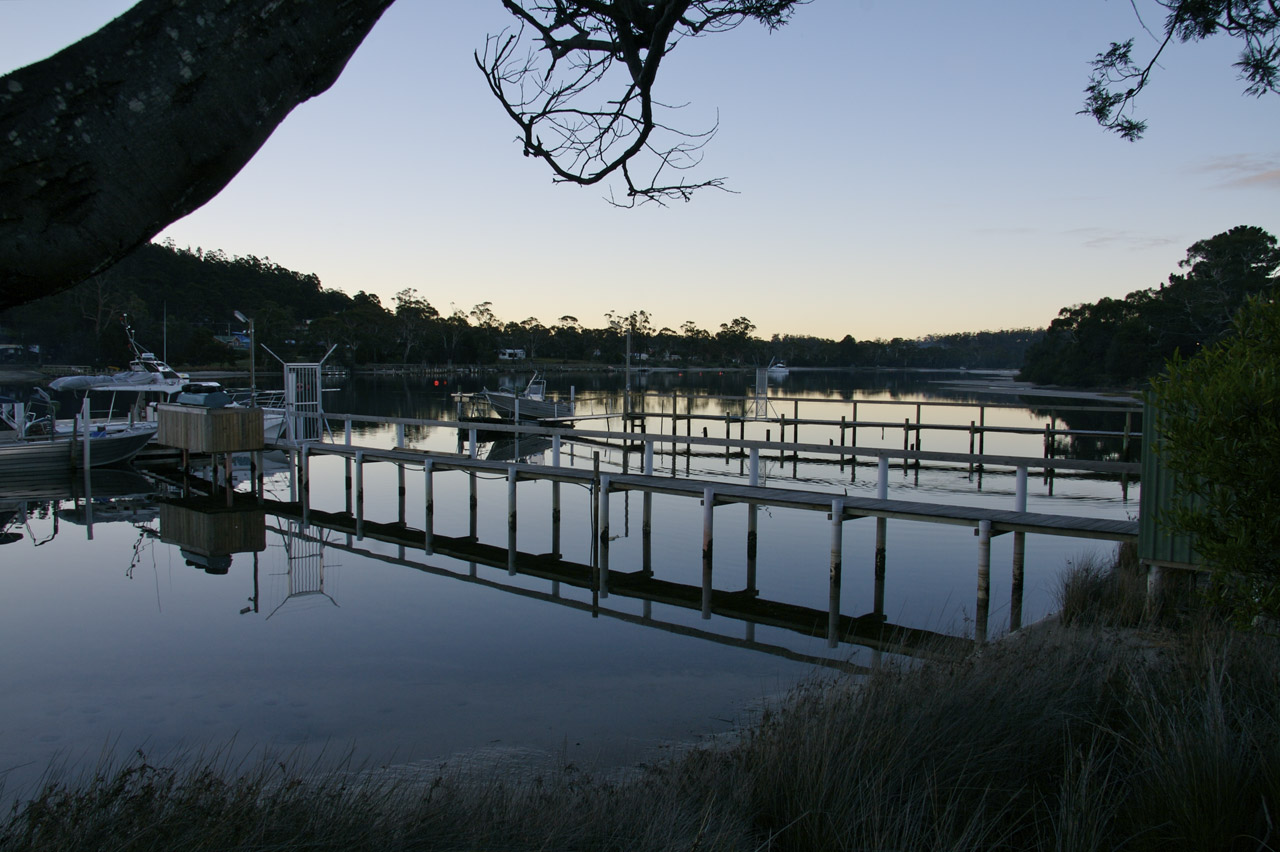
Prosser River jetties

In recent years, Orford has seen a rise in real estate investment, particularly with the Solis residential and tourism development at Louisville Point. Initially approved in May 2004, the project was ambitiously planned to include 550 residential allotments, 60 eco-tourism cabins, retail shops, a day spa, restaurants, and an 18-hole golf course designed by Greg Norman. Construction began in 2007, with the estimated cost of the project set at A$150 million.

However, despite the initial momentum, the development has faced several challenges over the years. Delays in construction, economic fluctuations, and environmental concerns have slowed progress. As of recent reports, only a portion of the development has been completed, with mixed results in terms of both economic impact and real estate success. While some residential allotments have been sold, and parts of the development are operational, the project has not yet lived up to its original vision. Nevertheless, it remains an ongoing project, with potential future growth depending on market conditions and further investment.

=== Okehampton Bay Pipeline Project ===
A multi-million-dollar pipeline is being constructed on Tasmania's east coast to supply freshwater from the Prosser River to Tassal's salmon farming operations in Okehampton Bay. The 18-kilometre (11 mi) pipeline is essential for maintaining fish health and mitigating amoebic gill disease (AGD), crucial to Tassal's aquaculture production.

The project promises economic benefits, including job creation and support for the local industry, but has also sparked environmental concerns. Critics worry about the long-term effects on the Prosser River ecosystem and freshwater resource management. Tassal has committed to responsible environmental practices while continuing with the project.

== Important Bird Area ==
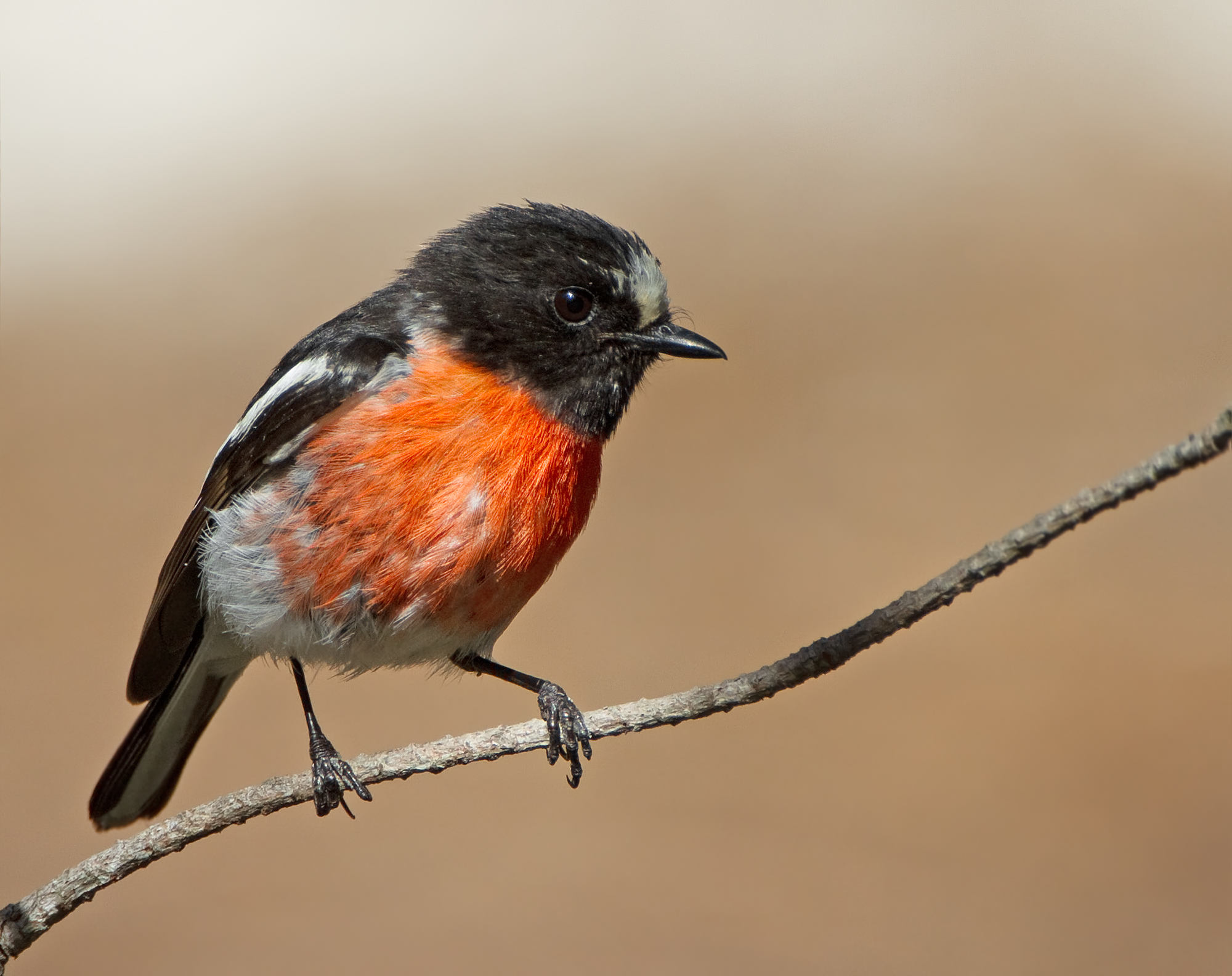
A petroica boodang in Orford's IBA

Orford is home to a significant conservation area for birdlife. A 3-hectare (7.4-acre) sandspit within the Raspins Beach Conservation Area has been designated as an Important Bird Area (IBA) by BirdLife International. This site supports 15–25 breeding pairs of vulnerable fairy terns, as well as breeding populations of red-capped, hooded plovers, and pied oystercatcher. Migratory birds such as red-necked stints can also be spotted in the area during the summer months.

Efforts have been made by the Tasmanian Parks and Wildlife Service to protect the breeding habitats of these birds, though disturbances from recreational activities remain a challenge.

== Climate ==
Orford experiences an oceanic climate, with mild winters and warm summers. Like much of Tasmania’s east coast, Orford is prone to occasional heatwaves, with temperatures reaching as high as 38 °C in summer. While snowfall is rare, frosty mornings are common in winter when skies are clear. Rainfall is moderate throughout the year, contributing to the lush eucalyptus forests and agricultural land surrounding the village.

Climate data for Orford (1951–2023)
Month	Jan	Feb	Mar	Apr	May	Jun	Jul	Aug	Sep	Oct	Nov	Dec	Year
Record high °C (°F)	38.8 (101.8)	38.8 (101.8)	36.2 (97.2)	31.4 (88.5)	25.7 (78.3)	20.5 (68.9)	19.5 (67.1)	22.6 (72.7)	28.4 (83.1)	32.4 (90.3)	36.8 (98.2)	39.7 (103.5)	39.7 (103.5)
Mean daily maximum °C (°F)	22.1 (71.8)	21.8 (71.2)	20.6 (69.1)	18.4 (65.1)	15.7 (60.3)	13.3 (55.9)	13.1 (55.6)	14.0 (57.2)	15.8 (60.4)	17.4 (63.3)	18.8 (65.8)	20.4 (68.7)	17.6 (63.7)
Mean daily minimum °C (°F)	12.0 (53.6)	12.0 (53.6)	10.7 (51.3)	8.4 (47.1)	6.3 (43.3)	4.2 (39.6)	3.6 (38.5)	4.2 (39.6)	5.6 (42.1)	7.3 (45.1)	9.2 (48.6)	10.6 (51.1)	7.8 (46.0)
Record low °C (°F)	3.2 (37.8)	3.3 (37.9)	1.1 (34.0)	0.0 (32.0)	−2.1 (28.2)	−5.3 (22.5)	−3.3 (26.1)	−2.9 (26.8)	−2.6 (27.3)	0.0 (32.0)	0.4 (32.7)	3.2 (37.8)	−5.3 (22.5)
Average precipitation mm (inches)	52.2 (2.06)	43.7 (1.72)	46.8 (1.84)	55.9 (2.20)	57.4 (2.26)	54.4 (2.14)	53.6 (2.11)	61.9 (2.44)	52.5 (2.07)	61.7 (2.43)	66.8 (2.63)	62.1 (2.44)	668.6 (26.32)
Average rainy days	9.6	8.8	10.1	11.2	12.6	12.4	13.7	13.7	13.0	13.6	13.6	11.8	144.1
Source: Bureau of Meteorology

== Demographics ==
Historical population
Year	Pop.	±%
2001	485	—
2011	518	+6.8%
2016	626	+20.8%
2021	685	+9.4%
Source: Australian Bureau of Statistics census data.

According to the 2021 census, Orford had a population of 685 people, showing steady growth from previous years with 485 residents in 2001 and 518 in 2011. The median age in Orford is 57 years, which is significantly higher than the national median of 38 years, indicating that the town has an older population overall. Gender distribution is almost even, with 49.9% identifying as male and 50.1% as female.

The majority of Orford’s residents are of Australian or Anglo-Celtic descent, with 83.6% born in Australia. Other notable countries of birth include England and New Zealand. A small percentage of the population (1.8%) identifies as Aboriginal or Torres Strait Islander, a figure lower than the state average. English is the dominant language spoken at home, with 96.4% of residents using it as their primary language. Other languages, such as German and Dutch, are spoken by a small minority.

In terms of religion, the largest religious affiliation in Orford is Christianity. Anglicanism is the most common denomination, with 26.8% of residents identifying as Anglican, followed by 16.3% who identify as Catholic. However, a significant portion of the population, 41.4%, reports no religious affiliation.

Orford has a notable number of non-resident property owners, many of whom own holiday homes or ‘shacks.’ During the summer months, the town’s population swells to over 3,000 as holidaymakers arrive. Most homes in Orford are detached houses, with a majority being owned outright or with a mortgage, reflecting the town’s older demographic and relatively stable housing market.

== Access ==
Orford is located on Tasmania’s east coast, approximately 73 kilometres (45 mi) north-east of Hobart. The primary route from Hobart to Orford is via the Tasman Highway (A3), which takes around an hour and a half by car. The road passes through rural areas and coastal landscapes.

From northern Tasmania, Orford can be reached by taking the Midland Highway (A1) to Campbell Town, then following Lake Leake Road (B34) eastward to the junction with the Tasman Highway. This route provides access from cities like Launceston and Devonport and takes approximately two and a half to three hours by car.

While Orford does not have major port facilities, the nearby town of Triabunna, located 6 kilometres (3.7 mi) north, serves as the region’s main port. Triabunna is the departure point for the ferry to Maria Island, a destination known for its wildlife and historical sites. Visitors to Orford may also use Triabunna’s port facilities for boating and fishing trips.

Public transport options to Orford are limited, but bus services operated by Tassielink Transit (routes 736 & 737) operate between Hobart and Swansea/Bicheno, passing through Orford.

Cycling to Orford is possible via the coastal roads, which are utilised by cyclists, especially during warmer months when the weather is favourable. The terrain may be more suitable for experienced cyclists.

The nearest commercial airport is Hobart Airport, located near Hobart.

== Notable people ==
Michael Kent AM (1941–2018) – Australian renowned businessman and politician. Mayor of Glamorgan–Spring Bay from 2014–2018.

== Sources ==
- "Orford–Triabunna Structure Plan" (PDF). Glamorgan Spring Bay Council.
