= Municipality of Glamorgan =

Former local government area in Tasmania

The Municipality of Glamorgan was a local government area in Tasmania which existed from 1860 to 1993. It was the first rural municipality in Tasmania. The council seat was located at Swansea.

It was proclaimed by Governor Henry Young on 23 January 1860 under the Rural Municipalities Act as the Rural Municipality of Glamorgan. The first council election was held on 29 February 1860, taking office from 1 March 1860. John Alexander Graham became the first warden. The proclamation followed a petition of local residents to the governor delivered on 15 October 1859.

The municipality covered an area of 439,000 acres, including the towns of Swansea, Bicheno, Seymour, Llandaff (now part of Bicheno) and Pontypool. It had six councillors, one of whom served as warden. It was unusual among rural municipalities in Tasmania that it also served as road trust and main roads, fruit, health and rabbit destruction boards; responsibilities generally the purview of separate bodies elsewhere. It was credited with much of the construction of main roads in the area. It owned Schouten Island for a period with a view to establishing a reserve for English game, but handed it back to the Crown when the idea was unsuccessful.

It was reconstituted as the Municipality of Glamorgan with effect from 2 January 1908 under the Local Government Act 1906, which abolished existing bodies as part of sweeping local government reform but established a municipality of the same name with similar boundaries. Its boundaries following the reconstitution were described as "extend[ing] from the Denison River on the East Coast, and takes in Schouten Island, and goes westerly to join the municipality of Campbell Town at Lake Leake". It was subdivided into three wards.

It amalgamated with the Municipality of Spring Bay to form the Glamorgan–Spring Bay Council in April 1993.
