= Glamorgan–Spring Bay Council =

- Local government area
- Interactive map of Glamorgan–Spring Bay Council
- Coordinates: 42.2672°S 147.9688°E
- Country: Australia
- State: Tasmania
- Region: Southern East coast
- Established: 2 April 1993
- Council seat: Triabunna

Government
  - Mayor: Greg Raspin
  - State electorate: Lyons
  - Federal division: Lyons

Area
  - Total: 2,592 km^{2} (1,001 sq mi)
- Website: Glamorgan–Spring Bay Council
LGAs around Glamorgan–Spring Bay Council
Northern Midlands	Break O'Day	Tasman Sea
Northern Midlands	Glamorgan–Spring Bay Council	Tasman Sea
Southern Midlands	Sorell	Tasman Sea

Glamorgan–Spring Bay Council is a local government body in Tasmania, situated on the central east coast of the state. Glamorgan–Spring Bay is classified as a rural local government area and has a population of 4,528, the major towns of the region include Bicheno, Orford and Swansea with Triabunna the principal town.

The list of Mayors and deputy-mayors can be found at List of mayors of Glamorgan–Spring Bay Council

== History and attributes ==
Glamorgan–Spring Bay was established on 2 April 1993 after the amalgamation of the Municipality of Glamorgan and Municipality of Spring Bay. The council derives its name from the region of Glamorgan in Wales. Glamorgan–Spring Bay is classified as rural, agricultural and medium (RAM) under the Australian Classification of Local Governments.

The Maria Island and Freycinet national parks are contained in the region.

== Council ==
=== Current composition ===
Name	Position	Party	Councillor Since
Greg Raspin	Mayor	Independent	2026–present
Elizabeth Grey	Deputy Mayor	Independent	2026–present
Cheryl Arnol	Councillor	Independent	1996–present
Greg Tory	Councillor	Independent	2026–present
Michael Symons	Councillor	Independent	2020–present
Neil Edwards	Councillor	Independent	2022–present
Pam Sharpe	Councillor	Independent	2026–present

== Election results ==
=== 2022 ===
2022 Tasmanian local elections: Glamorgan–Spring Bay
Party	Candidate	Votes	%	±%
Independent	Cheryl Arnol (elected)	729	19.27	+6.34
Independent	Michael Symons (elected)	546	14.43	+2.39
Independent	Jenny Woods (elected)	516	13.64	+9.57
Independent	Robert Forbes-Young (elected)	498	13.16	
Independent	Neil (Teddy) Edwards (elected)	349	9.22	
Independent	Greg Luck (elected)	301	7.95	
Independent	Rob Churchill (elected)	193	5.10	+3.36
Independent Labor	Carole McQueeney (elected)	190	5.02	
Independent	Annie Browning	151	3.99	−0.44
Independent	Kenneth Gregson	128	3.38	+1.84
Independent	Richard Parker	112	2.96	+1.53
Independent	Pat Gadd	71	1.88	
Total formal votes		3,784	97.28	
Informal votes		106	2.72	
Turnout		3,890	88.88	

== Suburbs ==
Suburb	Census population 2016	Reason
Bicheno	943	Includes Llandaff
Llandaff		Incl. in Bicheno
Friendly Beaches	10	
Coles Bay	353	
Dolphin Sands	126	
Swansea	866	
Rocky Hills	12	
Pontypool	53	
Little Swanport	117	Includes Ravendale
Ravendale		Incl. in Little Swanport
Spring Bay		Incl. in Triabunna
Triabunna	874	Includes Double Creek, Spring Bay
Double Creek		Incl. in Triabunna
Louisville		Incl. in Orford
Orford	626	Includes Louisville, Shelley Beach
Shelley Beach		Incl. in Orford
Spring Beach	97	
Rheban	7	
Buckland	179	
Cranbrook	67	
Apslawn	18	
Total	4,348	
	52	Variance
Local government total	4,400	Gazetted Glamorgan–Spring Bay Council local government area

=== Not in above list ===
- Douglas River
- Freycinet Peninsula
- Maria Island
- Nugent
- Runnymede
- Schouten Island
- Tooms Lake
- Woodsdale

== See also ==
- Local government areas of Tasmania
