= Little Swanport River =

River in Tasmania, Australia

Little Swanport
- Location of the Little Swanport River mouth in Tasmania

Location
- Country: Australia
- State: Tasmania
- Region: East Coast

Physical characteristics
- Source: Mount Burrows (Tasmania)
  - location: below Inglewood Hill
  - coordinates: 42°19′46″S 147°29′54″E
  - elevation: 522 m (1,713 ft)
- Mouth: Tasman Sea
  - location: Little Swanport
  - coordinates: 42°20′28″S 147°56′54″E
  - elevation: 0 m (0 ft)
- Length: 62 km (39 mi)

The Little Swanport River is a perennial river on the east coast of Tasmania, Australia.

== Course and features ==
The Little Swanport River forms a key part of the within Little Swanport water catchment. It is here that the Little Swanport River meets the sea and land use is more diverse with large coastal grazing properties, residential/holiday settlements, tourist accommodation, and olive and oyster farming enterprises. The mouth of the Little Swanport River (estuary) is a popular spot for recreational fishing and other seaside holiday activities. It supports several successful oyster farming enterprises.

The river forms the most northern border of the Pembroke Land District.

In the colonial period of the early 1800s the Lisdillon salt works used the Little Swanport River.

== See also ==
- List of rivers of Australia § Tasmania
