= Triabunna =

- Town
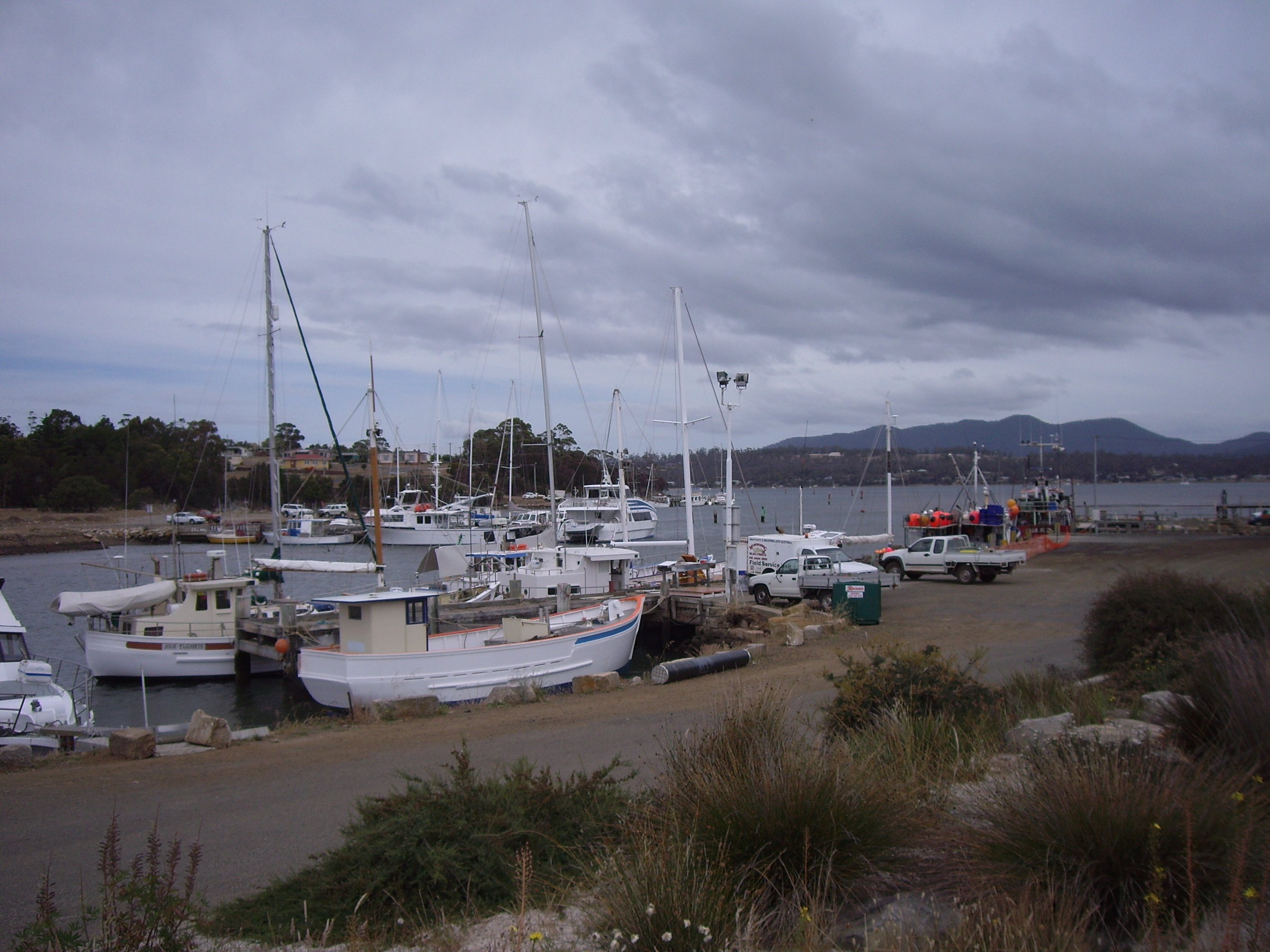
- Triabunna with The Three Thumbs in the background

- Coordinates: 42°30′S 147°54′E
- Country: Australia
- State: Tasmania
- Region: South-east
- LGA: Glamorgan Spring Bay Council
- Location: 6 km (3.7 mi) from Orford; 59 km (37 mi) from Sorell; 62 km (39 mi) from Swansea; 86 km (53 mi) NE of Hobart
- Established: 1830

Government
  - State electorate: Lyons
  - Federal division: Lyons

Population
  - Total: 905 (2021 census)
- Postcode: 7190
- Mean max temp: 17.6 °C (63.7 °F)
- Mean min temp: 7.8 °C (46.0 °F)
- Annual rainfall: 668.6 mm (26.32 in)
Localities around Triabunna
Buckland	Little Swanport	Tasman Sea
Buckland	Triabunna	Tasman Sea
Buckland	Orford	Tasman Sea

Triabunna is a rural residential locality in the local government area (LGA) of Glamorgan–Spring Bay in the South-east LGA region of Tasmania. The locality is about 86 kilometres (53 mi) north-east of the city of Hobart. The 2021 census recorded a population of 905 for the state suburb of Triabunna.

It is the second largest township on the east coast of Tasmania (after St Helens, population 2049, 2006 Census), the civic and municipal heart of the Glamorgan Spring Bay Council and is 84 kilometres to the north-east of the state capital Hobart. It is a coastal town on the Tasman Highway, and is sheltered within Spring Bay at the mouth of MacCleans Creek and Vickerys Rivulet. The nearest township is Orford, 6 kilometres to the south on the far side of the bay.

The nearby resort and residences of Louisville are considered a satellite community of Triabunna.

Triabunna is a scenic township surrounded by beaches, hills and beautiful tracts of eucalyptus forest. The area contains many historic buildings from Tasmania's colonial period. Triabunna also has views of Maria Island, which can be reached by a short ferry ride from the town.

Located on the Triabunna foreshore there is the Tasmanian Seafarers Memorial, a memorial jointly commemorating all Tasmanian seafarers who died at sea, including Tasmanian members of the armed services, and those seafarers who, regardless of occupation or nationality, died in Tasmanian waters. A memorial service is held in October each year when recently added memorial plaques remembering lives lost are dedicated.

The weather on the east coast of Tasmania is particularly mild, and warm sunny summers are a feature of life in Triabunna, which makes it a good holiday or retirement destination. The pleasant beaches and ease of access make the town a haven for those who enjoy watersports such as fishing, sailing, surfing, and diving. Triabunna also has facilities for tennis, cricket, golf and Australian rules football. Bushwalking in the nearby forests is also popular.

== History ==
The area was formerly known as Tenby, and was shown as such on an 1837 map. "Triabunna" was in use by 1866. Triabunna was gazetted as a locality in 1960.

"Triabunna" is an Aboriginal Tasmanian word for the endemic Tasmanian native-hen. The town was founded in 1830 as a station of the 63rd regiment, and later the 51st regiment also called Triabunna home for a time.

There was a shore-based bay whaling station operating in Spring Bay by 1831. By 1837, there were at least nine such establishments in the Spring Bay district.

The first Spring Bay Post Office opened on 28 February 1832 and closed later that year. It reopened in 1836 and was renamed Triabunna in 1881.

== Geography ==
The waters of the Tasman Sea form the eastern boundary.

=== Climate ===
Triabunna has an oceanic climate (Köppen: Cfb), with very mild, summers and cool winters. Due to being leeward of the Central Highlands, foehn winds can significantly raise the maximum temperature, particularly in summer. Average maxima vary from 22.1 °C (71.8 °F) in January to 13.1 °C (55.6 °F) in July while average minima fluctuate between 12.0 °C (53.6 °F) in January and February and 3.6 °C (38.5 °F) in July. Mean average annual precipitation is moderate, 668.6 mm (26.32 in) spread between 144.1 precipitation days, and is concentrated in winter. In addition, the town is not very sunny, with 150.3 cloudy days and only 51.8 clear days per annum. Extreme temperatures have ranged from 39.7 °C (103.5 °F) on 30 December 2019 to −5.3 °C (22.5 °F) on 24 June 1972. Climate data was sourced from Orford, located 6 kilometres (3.7 mi) south of Triabunna.

Climate data for Triabunna (42º33'00"S, 147º52'48"E, 14 m AMSL) (1951–2024 normals and extremes)
Month	Jan	Feb	Mar	Apr	May	Jun	Jul	Aug	Sep	Oct	Nov	Dec	Year
Record high °C (°F)	38.8 (101.8)	38.8 (101.8)	36.2 (97.2)	31.4 (88.5)	25.7 (78.3)	20.5 (68.9)	19.5 (67.1)	22.6 (72.7)	28.4 (83.1)	32.4 (90.3)	36.8 (98.2)	39.7 (103.5)	39.7 (103.5)
Mean daily maximum °C (°F)	22.1 (71.8)	21.8 (71.2)	20.6 (69.1)	18.4 (65.1)	15.7 (60.3)	13.3 (55.9)	13.1 (55.6)	14.0 (57.2)	15.8 (60.4)	17.4 (63.3)	18.8 (65.8)	20.4 (68.7)	17.6 (63.7)
Mean daily minimum °C (°F)	12.0 (53.6)	12.0 (53.6)	10.7 (51.3)	8.4 (47.1)	6.3 (43.3)	4.2 (39.6)	3.6 (38.5)	4.2 (39.6)	5.6 (42.1)	7.3 (45.1)	9.2 (48.6)	10.6 (51.1)	7.8 (46.1)
Record low °C (°F)	3.2 (37.8)	3.3 (37.9)	1.1 (34.0)	0.0 (32.0)	−2.1 (28.2)	−5.3 (22.5)	−3.3 (26.1)	−2.9 (26.8)	−2.6 (27.3)	0.0 (32.0)	0.4 (32.7)	3.2 (37.8)	−5.3 (22.5)
Average precipitation mm (inches)	52.2 (2.06)	43.7 (1.72)	46.8 (1.84)	55.9 (2.20)	57.4 (2.26)	54.4 (2.14)	53.6 (2.11)	61.9 (2.44)	52.5 (2.07)	61.7 (2.43)	66.8 (2.63)	62.1 (2.44)	668.6 (26.32)
Average precipitation days (≥ 0.2 mm)	9.6	8.8	10.1	11.2	12.6	12.4	13.7	13.7	13.0	13.6	13.6	11.8	144.1
Average afternoon relative humidity (%)	64	64	64	66	69	73	71	65	64	62	65	62	66
Average dew point °C (°F)	12.3 (54.1)	12.4 (54.3)	11.3 (52.3)	9.7 (49.5)	8.2 (46.8)	6.7 (44.1)	6.1 (43.0)	5.8 (42.4)	7.0 (44.6)	7.7 (45.9)	9.7 (49.5)	10.7 (51.3)	9.0 (48.2)
Source: Bureau of Meteorology (1951–2024 normals and extremes)

== Access and facilities ==
The Tasman Highway (Route A3) runs through Triabunna from south to north. Route C319 (Freestone Point Road) starts at an intersection with A3 and runs south to Freestone Point, where it ends.

St. Anne's Catholic church is served from St. John's Catholic Parish, based in Richmond.

== Gallery ==
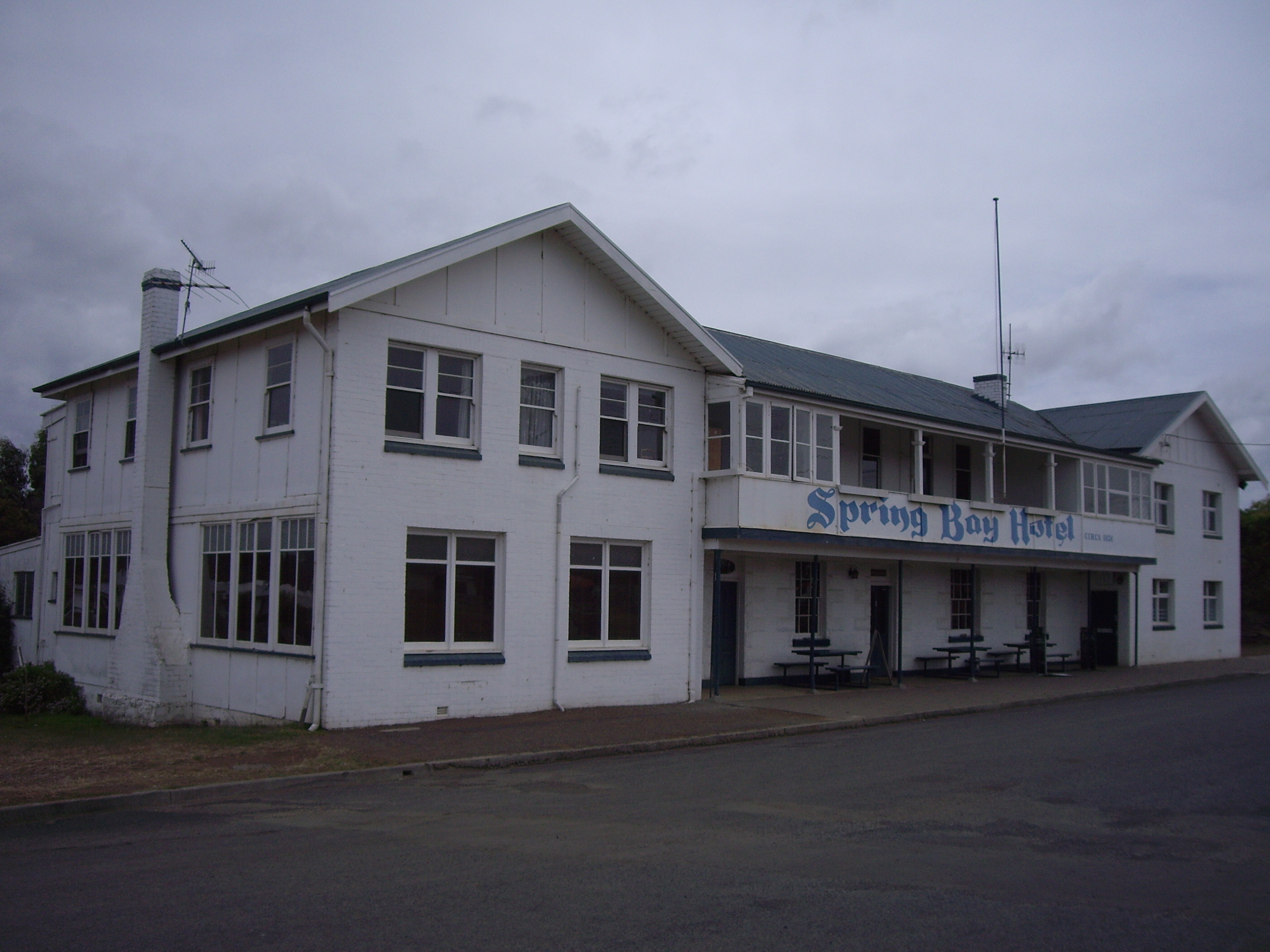
Spring Bay Hotel

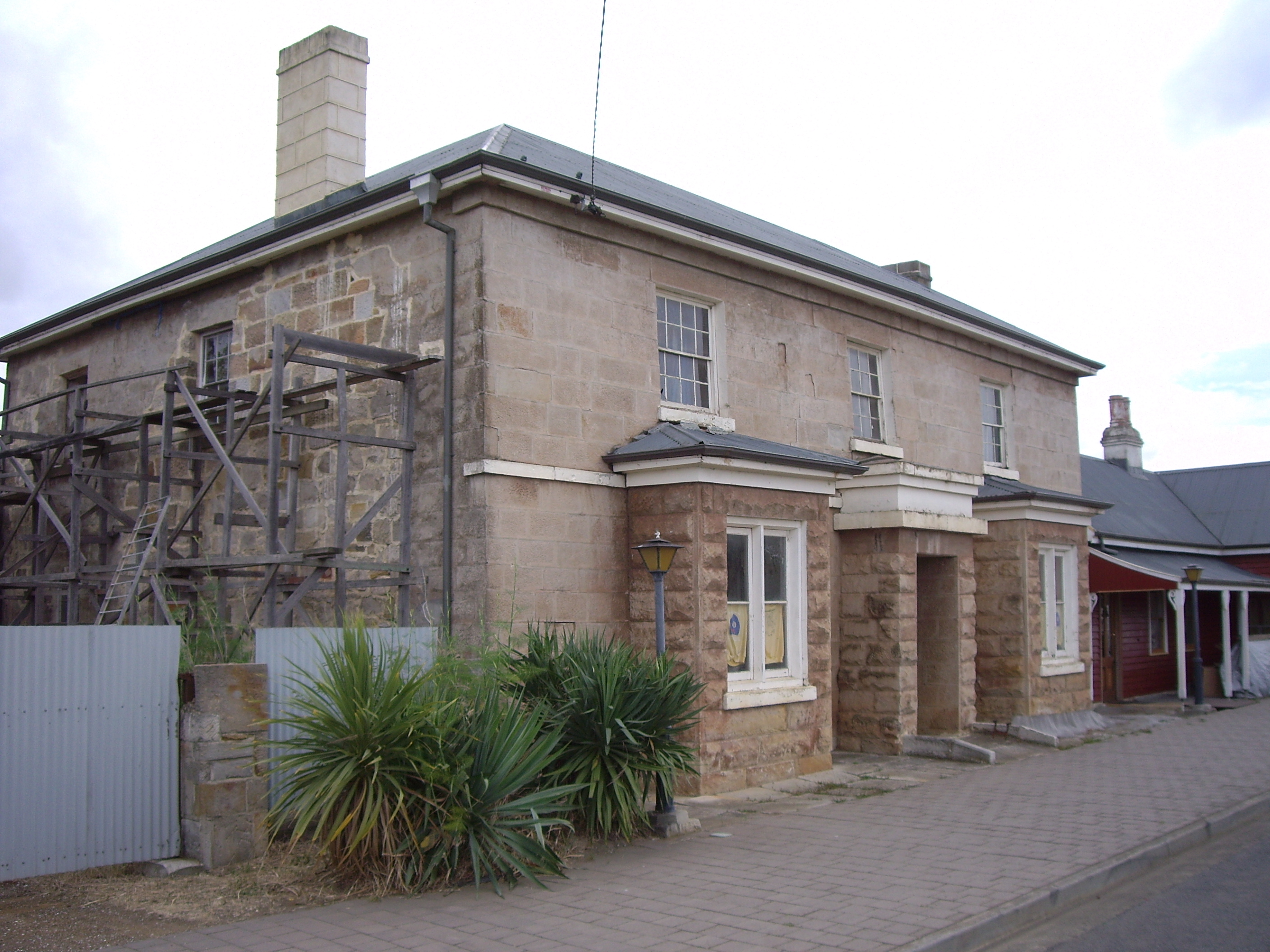
Part of Charles Street

== See also ==
- Seafish Tasmania
