= Swansea, Tasmania =

Swansea
- Town
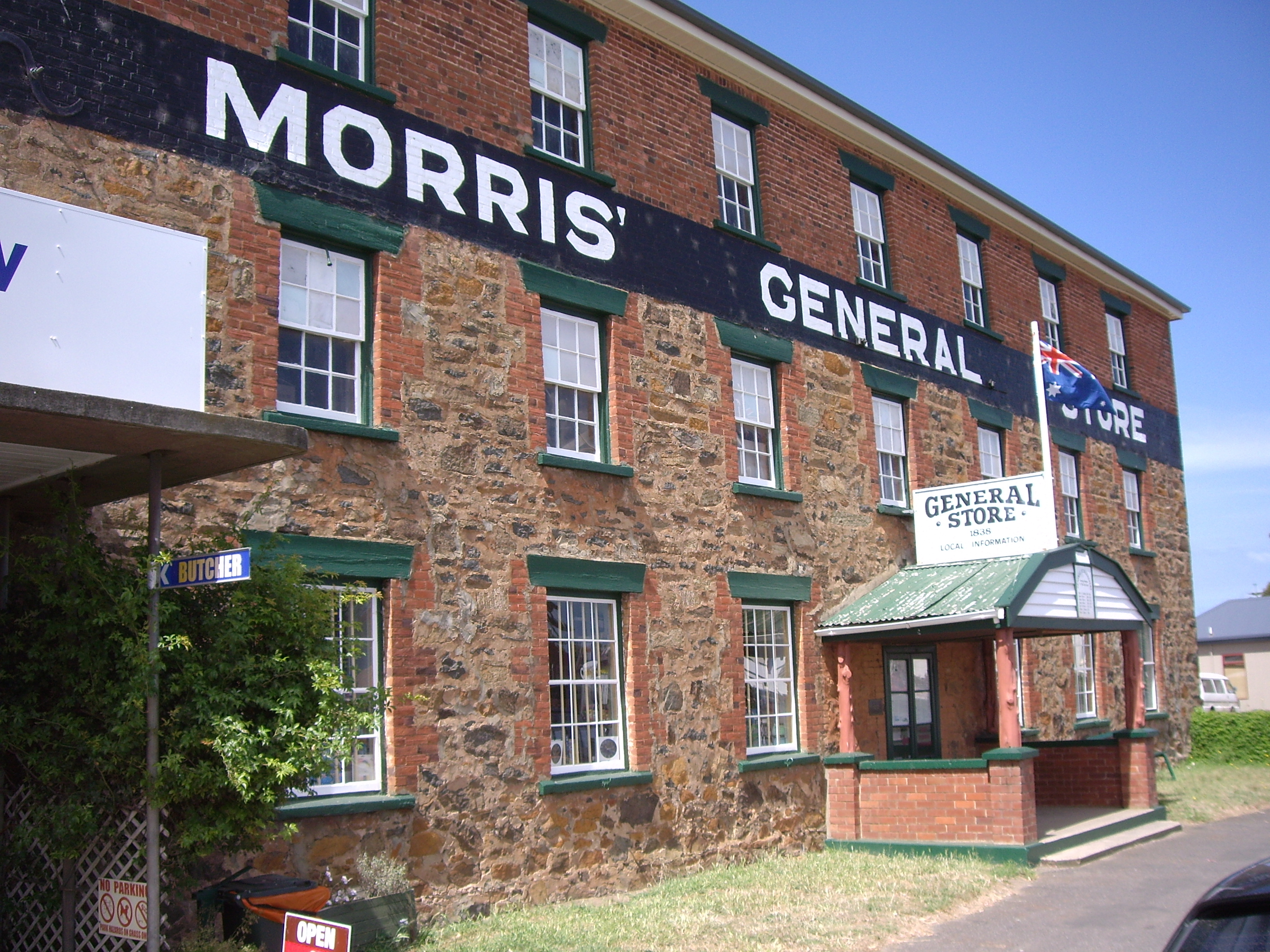
- Morris' General Store in the main street of Swansea

- Coordinates: 42°08′S 148°05′E
- Country: Australia
- State: Tasmania
- LGA: Glamorgan Spring Bay Council
- Location: 43 km (27 mi) from Bicheno; 50 km (31 mi) from Triabunna; 134 km (83 mi) from Hobart

Government
  - State electorate: Lyons
  - Federal division: Lyons
- Elevation: 6 m (20 ft)

Population
  - Total: 997 (2021 census)
- Postcode: 7190
- Mean max temp: 17.9 °C (64.2 °F)
- Mean min temp: 7.8 °C (46.0 °F)
- Annual rainfall: 593.8 mm (23.38 in)

Swansea is a town in the heart of Tasmania's east coast, on the north-west shore of Great Oyster Bay and overlooking Freycinet National Park. It was the first municipality in Australia to be established after Hobart and Sydney. At the 2021 census, Swansea had a population of 997.

The town was formed in 1821 and celebrated its 200th birthday in 2021.

== History ==
The Paredarerme language were spoken by Tasmanian Aborigines in the area. It became extinct during the 19th century.

The first European to explore the Swansea area was Captain John Henry Cox sailing from England to Sydney. He took his ship, the Mercury, up the eastern coast of Tasmania. On 3 July 1789, having heard of vast colonies of seals in the area, he sailed along the western shore of Maria Island and into a stretch of water he named Oyster Bay.

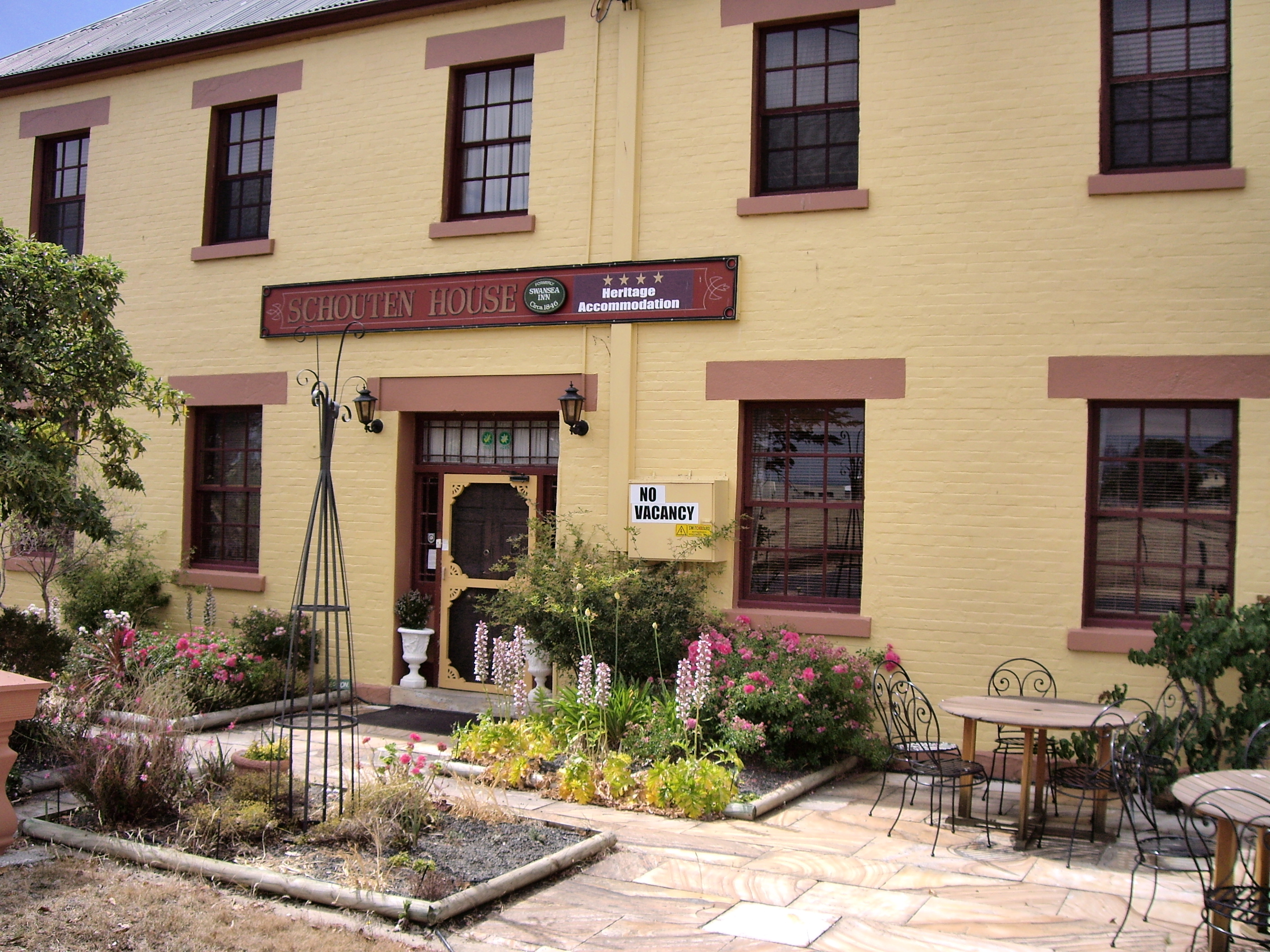
Schouten House, Swansea

Swansea was not settled until 1821 when more British settlers, George Meredith, his family and workers, arrived from Pembrokeshire, Wales. Meredith obtained a grant from Lieutenant Governor William Sorell to farm in the area around Oyster Bay. The land was developed and made suitable for seasonal crops and grazing stock and a tannery and flour mill were established by the Meredith River. Whaling stations were also set up on nearby islands to enable the export of whale oil. Swansea was originally called Great Swanport and Meredith built the family home, Cambria, which is now in private hands. There are other important buildings in the town including Morris’ General Store which has been owned and run by the Morris family for over 100 years. The Swansea Bark Mill which processed black wattle bark was used in colonial times in the tanning industry and is now a combined museum, tavern and bakery. Schouten House is a fine early Victorian colonial house built in 1844 and is now a hotel.

Waterloo Point Post Office opened on 6 September 1832 and was renamed Swansea around 1863.

== Notable residents ==
- William Lyne, Premier of New South Wales from 1899 to 1901, and later federal cabinet minister under Edmund Barton and Alfred Deakin
- Violet Mace, potter known for the "proclamation cup", based on Governor Davey's Proclamation

== Wildlife ==
Swansea is home to colonies of short-tailed shearwaters (muttonbirds) and little penguins. The nearby Freycinet National Park has quolls, wallabies, native microbats, possums and Tasmanian devils. Offshore, there are dolphins, whales and seals.

=== Climate ===
Swansea possesses an oceanic climate (Köppen: Cfb) with tepid summers and cool winters. The town is quite cloudy, experiencing an average of 60.0 clear days and 123.5 cloudy days per annum. Extreme temperatures have ranged from 41.1 °C (106.0 °F) on 30 December 2019 to −5.0 °C (23.0 °F) on 15 July 1979.

Climate data for Swansea (42.12°S 148.07°E, 6 m (20 ft) AMSL) (1884–2008)
Month	Jan	Feb	Mar	Apr	May	Jun	Jul	Aug	Sep	Oct	Nov	Dec	Year
Record high °C (°F)	40.4 (104.7)	39.2 (102.6)	36.8 (98.2)	30.1 (86.2)	27.0 (80.6)	21.1 (70.0)	24.0 (75.2)	24.3 (75.7)	29.6 (85.3)	33.9 (93.0)	36.0 (96.8)	38.1 (100.6)	40.4 (104.7)
Mean daily maximum °C (°F)	22.2 (72.0)	22.2 (72.0)	20.9 (69.6)	18.6 (65.5)	15.9 (60.6)	13.8 (56.8)	13.3 (55.9)	14.2 (57.6)	16.0 (60.8)	17.7 (63.9)	19.1 (66.4)	20.7 (69.3)	17.9 (64.2)
Mean daily minimum °C (°F)	11.7 (53.1)	11.8 (53.2)	10.4 (50.7)	8.2 (46.8)	6.2 (43.2)	4.4 (39.9)	3.6 (38.5)	4.4 (39.9)	5.8 (42.4)	7.2 (45.0)	8.0 (46.4)	10.6 (51.1)	7.7 (45.8)
Record low °C (°F)	2.7 (36.9)	1.3 (34.3)	0.0 (32.0)	−1.3 (29.7)	−3.1 (26.4)	−4.0 (24.8)	−5.0 (23.0)	−4.2 (24.4)	−4.0 (24.8)	−1.9 (28.6)	−1.4 (29.5)	1.0 (33.8)	−5.0 (23.0)
Average precipitation mm (inches)	49.8 (1.96)	42.6 (1.68)	50.5 (1.99)	51.3 (2.02)	46.4 (1.83)	56.9 (2.24)	48.0 (1.89)	43.6 (1.72)	40.4 (1.59)	53.8 (2.12)	50.8 (2.00)	59.9 (2.36)	593.8 (23.38)
Average precipitation days (≥ 0.2 mm)	8.4	7.3	9.0	9.6	9.6	10.4	10.8	10.8	11.0	11.6	10.3	10.0	118.8
Average afternoon relative humidity (%)	59	61	60	62	65	66	65	62	60	59	61	60	62
Average dew point °C (°F)	11.3 (52.3)	12.0 (53.6)	10.9 (51.6)	9.2 (48.6)	7.7 (45.9)	6.1 (43.0)	5.3 (41.5)	5.3 (41.5)	6.1 (43.0)	7.2 (45.0)	9.1 (48.4)	10.3 (50.5)	8.4 (47.1)
Mean monthly sunshine hours	248.0	209.1	195.3	180.0	139.5	126.0	145.7	167.4	193.0	217.0	210.0	235.6	2,266.6
Percentage possible sunshine	54	54	51	55	46	46	50	52	52	53	48	50	51
Source: Bureau of Meteorology (1884–2008), December record high

== Demographics ==
According to the 1996 census, the town's population was 495. Of the population, 25.1% were above the age of 65 – making it the Tasmanian town with the largest percentage of over-65-year-olds.
