= List of road routes in Tasmania =

Road routes in Tasmania assist drivers navigating roads in urban, rural, and scenic areas of the state. The route numbering system is composed of National Highway 1, and three categories of alphanumeric routes: 'A' routes, which are the state's most important arterial roads; 'B' routes, other important sub-arterial and connecting roads; and 'C' routes, significant minor roads.

The current route numbering system was introduced in 1979, based on the British alphanumeric system from 1963. The new system aimed to upgrade the signing of destinations, including previously unmarked roads, and to simplify navigation by allowing visitors to follow numbered routes. There have been various changes to the system over the years, including a few minor adjustments after a 2011 review by the Road Route Code Advisory Group.

== Road route zones ==
For the purpose of allocation of route numbers the state has been divided into eight zones, each delineated by major highways. Where possible the numbering of zones was chosen from adjacent highway route numbers. With a few exceptions all routes in a zone have a number that commences with the zone number. Thus, A7, B71 and C701 are all in zone 7.

=== Zone 1 ===
Zone 1 covers a section of the north coast and a substantial inland area to the south, reaching almost to Hobart. It is delineated as follows:

- The junction of the A2 road (Bass Highway) and the A10 Road (Murchison Highway) in Somerset is the north-west corner of the zone.
- The A2 road from Somerset to Burnie, and National Route 1 from Burnie to its junction with the A5 road (Lake Highway) in Deloraine forms the northern and north-eastern boundary.
- The A5 road from Deloraine to its junction with National Route 1 in Melton Mowbray, and National Route 1 from Melton Mowbray to its junction with the B10 road in Bridgewater form the eastern boundary.
- The B10 road, from Bridgewater to its junction with the A10 road (Lyell Highway) in New Norfolk forms the south-eastern boundary.
- The A10 road (Lyell Highway to Queenstown) forms the southern boundary, and its continuation (Zeehan Highway to Zeehan and Murchison Highway to Somerset) forms the western boundary.

=== Zone 2 ===
Zone 2 covers the north-west corner of the state, from the Zone 1 western boundary to the coast as far south as Macquarie Harbour. King Island is included in this zone.

=== Zone 3 ===
Zone 3 covers the south-east corner of the state, including the northern part of Hobart. It is delineated as follows:

- The junction of National Route 1 and the A4 road (Esk Highway) in Conara is the north-west corner of the zone.
- The A4 road from Conara to its junction with the A3 road (Tasman Highway) in Falmouth forms the northern boundary.
- The A3 road from Falmouth to Bicheno and the coastline from Bicheno to the Derwent River form the eastern and southern boundaries.
- National Route 1 from Hobart to Conara forms the western boundary.

=== Zone 4 ===
Zone 4 covers a section of the north-east of the state, from the Zone 3 northern boundary to Zone 8, which occupies the north-east corner of the state. It is delineated as follows:

- The junction of National Route 1 (northbound) and the A3 road (eastbound) in Launceston is the north-west corner of the zone.
- The A3 road from Launceston to the A4 road in Falmouth forms the northern boundary.
- The A4 road from Falmouth to National Route 1 at Conara forms the eastern and southern boundaries.
- National Route 1 from Conara to Launceston forms the western boundary.

=== Zone 5 ===
Zone 5 covers a section of central Tasmania to the west of National Route 1, which separates it from Zones 3 and 4. It is delineated as follows:

- The junction of National Route 1 and the A5 road in Deloraine is the north-west corner of the zone.
- National Route 1 from Deloraine to Hagley, the B54 road from Hagley to Travellers Rest, and National Route 1 from Travellers Rest to Prospect form the northern boundary.
- National Route 1 from Prospect to the A5 road at Melton Mowbray forms the eastern boundary.
- The A5 road from Melton Mowbray to Deloraine forms the southern and western boundaries.

=== Zone 6 ===
Zone 6 covers the area south and west of the Derwent River and south and west of the A10 road as far west as Derwent Bridge. Bruny Island is included in this zone.

=== Zone 7 ===
Zone 7 covers the area west of the Tamar River to National Route 1 from Devonport to Deloraine, the B54 road from Deloraine to National Route 1 at Travellers Rest, and National Route 1 from Travellers Rest to Launceston. It also includes a small area north of Launceston, east of the Tamar, west of the A8 road (East Tamar Highway) and south of the B73 road (Batman Highway)

=== Zone 8 ===
Zone 8 covers the north-east corner of the state, east of the Tamar River. Its southern road boundaries are:

- B73 road (Batman Highway)
- A8 road (East Tamar Highway)
- A3 road (Tasman Highway)

Flinders Island is included in this zone.

== Routes ==
=== National Highway 1 and A routes ===
These are the state's most important arterial roads.

Route	Component roads	From	Via	To	Length	Notes ↑ (Top)
National Highway 1	Liverpool Street, Hobart; Brooker Avenue, Hobart; Brooker Highway; Midland Highway, known in places as: * High Street, Campbell Town; Streets in Launceston: * Bathurst Street (northbound); * Wellington Street (southbound)	Hobart		Launceston	199.0 km (123.7 mi)	Midland Highway includes the Brighton Bypass as well as the Bridgewater Bridge and the Red Bridge
National Highway 1	Bass Highway, known in Burnie as: * Marine Terrace	Prospect		Burnie	141.4 km (87.9 mi)	Prospect is a suburb of Launceston
A2	Bass Highway	Burnie	Smithton	Marrawah	131.2 km (81.5 mi)	
A3	Liverpool Street, Hobart; Tasman Highway, known in places as: * Main Road, Sorell; * Gordon Street, Sorell; * Cole Street, Sorell; * High Street, Buckland; * Prosser River Road, Orford; * Victoria Street, Swansea; * Franklin Street, Swansea; * Burgess Street, Bicheno; * Foster Street, Bicheno; * Scamander Avenue, Scamander; * Georges Bay Esplanade, St Helens; * Cecilia Street, St Helens; * Tully Street, St Helens; * Main Street, Derby; * Scott Street, Branxholm; * Ringarooma Road, Scottsdale; * King Street, Scottsdale; * St Leonards Road, Waverley; Streets in Launceston: * Hoblers Bridge Road; * Elphin Road; * Brisbane Street; * George Street; * York Street; * Charles Street; * Paterson Street	Hobart	Orford	Launceston	414.0 km (257.2 mi)	Tasman Highway includes Mcgees Bridge, the Sorell Causeway and the Tasman Bridge
A4	Esk Highway, known in places as: * Falmouth Street, Avoca; * Stieglitz Street, Fingal; * Talbot Street, Fingal; Streets in St Marys: * Main Street; * Story Street; * Gray Road	Conara	St Marys	Falmouth	82.0 km (51.0 mi)	A4 splits at St Marys – northern end to Falmouth, southern end to Chain of Lagoons
A4	Elephant Pass Road	St Marys		Chain of Lagoons	16.4 km (10.2 mi)	
A5	Highland Lakes Road (formerly Lake Highway), known in places as: * Patrick Street, Bothwell; * Barrack Street, Bothwell; * East Parade, Deloraine; * Meander Valley Road; * Bowerbank Link	Melton Mowbray		Deloraine	152.0 km (94.4 mi)	
A6	Brooker Avenue; Davey Street; Macquarie Street; Southern Outlet; Huon Highway; Main Street, Huonville	Hobart	Kingston	Southport	97.7 km (60.7 mi)	
A7	York Street, Launceston; West Tamar Road; West Tamar Highway; Elouera Street, Trevallyn; Brisbane Street; Main Road, Lanena & Exeter; Weld Street, Beaconsfield; Flinders Street, Beauty Point; West Arm Road, Ilfraville; Greens Beach Road	Launceston	Beauty Point	Greens Beach	65.1 km (40.5 mi)	
A8	Bathurst Street, Launceston; Lower Charles Street; Wellington Street; Goderich Street; East Tamar Highway; Main Road, Bell Bay; Goulburn Street; Low Head Road, Low Head	Launceston	George Town	Low Head	56.2 km (34.9 mi)	
A9	Cole Street, Sorell; Arthur Highway	Sorell	Dunalley	Port Arthur	69.9 km (43.4 mi)	
A10	Lyell Highway; Hobart Road, New Norfolk; Montagu Crescent; Hamilton Road; Franklin Place, Hamilton; Batchelor Street, Queenstown; Penghana Road; Zeehan Highway; Murchison Highway; Agnes Street, Rosebery; Read Street	Granton	Queenstown	Somerset	416.0 km (258.5 mi)	

=== B routes ===
These are other important sub-arterial and connecting roads.

==== B10 to B50 ====
Route	Component roads	From	Via	To	Length	Notes ↑ (Top)
B10	Boyer Road; Rocks Road	Bridgewater	Boyer	New Norfolk	17.6 km (10.9 mi)	
B11	Marlborough Highway	Bronte Park		Miena	31.4 km (19.5 mi)	
B12	Mole Creek Road; Sorell Street; Jones Street; Pioneer Drive; Liena Road	Deloraine	Mole Creek	King Solomons Caves, Liena	39.0 km (24.2 mi)	King Solomons Caves is a tourist attraction in the locality of Liena.
B13	Railton Road; Kimberley Road; Foster Street; Latrobe Road; Railton Road	Elizabeth Town	Railton	Latrobe	33.5 km (20.8 mi)	
B14	Foster Street; Sheffield Road; Main Street, Sheffield; Sheffield Road	Railton	Sheffield	~~Devonport~~; Spreyton	34.4 km (21.4 mi)	Sheffield Road ends in Spreyton, well outside Devonport.
B15	Main Street; Castra Road	Ulverstone		Nietta	30.6 km (19.0 mi)	
B16	Kindred Road	Forth	Kindred	Sprent	14.3 km (8.9 mi)	
B17	Kings Parade; Lovett Street; Adaihi Street; Lovett Street; Gawler Road; Preston Road, Gawler; Gunns Plains Road; South Riana Road, Gunns Plains; Pine Road; Enterprise Avenue; Pine Road; Mission Hill Road; Main Road, Penguin	Ulverstone	Gunns Plains, Riana	Penguin	50.2 km (31.2 mi)	
B18	Mount Street; Ridgley Highway	Burnie	Ridgley, Hampshire	Fingerpost	54.2 km (33.7 mi)	Fingerpost is an unbounded locality in the locality of Guildford
B19	Gilbert Street; Frogmore Lane; Mersey Main Road; Stony Rise Road, Quoiba; Forth Road, Don; Turners Beach Road, Turners Beach; Westella Drive; Turners Beach Road; Clayton Road East	Latrobe	Forth	Turners Beach	24.0 km (14.9 mi)	
B21	Stanley Highway; Main Road; Wharf Road	Bass Highway, Forest		Stanley	8.0 km (5.0 mi)	
B22	Irishtown Road; Grooms Cross Road; Trowutta Road	Smithton		Edith Creek	15.8 km (9.8 mi)	
B23	Waratah Road; Camp Road; Smith Street; William Street; Waratah Road; Luina Township Road; Waratah Road; Corinna Road	Guildford Junction		Savage River	43.9 km (27.3 mi)	Guildford Junction is an unofficial place name in the locality of Guildford.
B24	Lyell Highway; Reid Street; Harold Street; Harvey Street	Queenstown		Strahan	37.5 km (23.3 mi)	
B25	Grassy Road; Edward Street; Main Street; North Road; Cape Wickham Road	Grassy		Cape Wickham	74.7 km (46.4 mi)	On King Island. Cape Wickham is a promontory in the locality of Wickham.
B26	Mount Hicks Road	Wynyard		Yolla	15.1 km (9.4 mi)	
B27	Zeehan Highway; Main Street; Henty Road; Andrew Street; Innes Street; Bay Street; Esplanade	Murchison Highway, Zeehan		Strahan	47.5 km (29.5 mi)	
B28	Anthony Road	Tullah		~~Queenstown~~; West Coast	38.5 km (23.9 mi)	Anthony Road ends at the Zeehan Highway in the locality of West Coast, some distance north of the Queenstown boundary.
B31	Cambridge Road; Richmond Road; Bridge Street; Franklin Street; Colebrook Road; Reeve Street; Colebrook Road; Richmond Street; Mud Walls Road	Cambridge	Richmond	Jericho	60.2 km (37.4 mi)	
B32	East Derwent Highway	Rose Bay		Bridgewater	22.3 km (13.9 mi)	Includes Jordan River Bridge
B33	South Arm Highway; Rokeby Road; South Arm Road	Mornington	South Arm	Opossum Bay	35.3 km (21.9 mi)	
B34	Montagu Street; Lake Leake Road	Campbell Town		Swansea	57.5 km (35.7 mi)	
B35	Goodwood Road	Glenorchy		Otago	3.2 km (2.0 mi)	Includes Bowen Bridge
B36	Domain Highway	Tasman Highway, Queens Domain		Brooker Highway, Queens Domain	2.0 km (1.2 mi)	Queens Domain is a suburb of Hobart.
B37	Nubeena Road; Main Road; Nubeena Road	Taranna	Nubeena	Port Arthur	27.4 km (17.0 mi)	
B41	Evandale Road; Leighlands Road	Breadalbane	Evandale	Midland Highway, Perth	10.3 km (6.4 mi)	
B42	Storeys Creek Road; Rossarden Road; Walter Street; Lee Street; Rossarden Road; Argyle Street; Elizabeth Street; Mangana Road	Avoca	Rossarden	Fingal	45.1 km (28.0 mi)	
B43	Brown Street; Mathinna Road	Fingal		Mathinna	25.6 km (15.9 mi)	

==== B51 to B110 ====
Route	Component roads	From	Via	To	Length	Notes ↑ (Top)
B51	Tannery Road South; Wellington Street; Marlborough Street; Cressy Road; Main Street, Cressey; Poatina Road	Longford	Cressy	Miena	75.2 km (46.7 mi)	
B52	Drummond Street; Illawarra Road	Perth		Carrick	15.5 km (9.6 mi)	
B53	Powranna Road	Powranna		Cressy	16.9 km (10.5 mi)	
B54	Meander Valley Road	Travellers Rest	Carrick, Hagley, Exton	Deloraine	37.2 km (23.1 mi)	
B61	Gordon River Road; Kallista Road	Rosegarland	Maydena	Strathgordon	119.0 km (73.9 mi)	
B62	Montagu Street; Glenora Road	New Norfolk	Plenty	Bushy Park	18.3 km (11.4 mi)	
B64	Davey Street, Hobart; Huon Road; Sandfly Road	Hobart	Fern Tree	~~Huonville~~; Longley	18.6 km (11.6 mi)	The B64 section of Sandfly Road ends at the Huon Highway in the locality of Longley, a long way from Huonville.
B66	Lennon Road; Bruny Island Main Road	Roberts Point	Alonnah, Great Bay	Lunawanna	42.4 km (26.3 mi)	On Bruny Island. Roberts Point is a geographical feature in the locality of North Bruny.
B68	Sandy Bay Road; Channel Highway; Southern Outlet; Charlton Street, Cygnet; Mary Street; The Esplanade, Huonville	Hobart	Taroona, Kingston, Cygnet	Huonville	97.9 km (60.8 mi)	Channel Highway includes the Kingston Bypass
B71	Frankford Road	~~Devonport~~; East Devonport	Frankford	Exeter	60.3 km (37.5 mi)	Frankford Road starts in the locality of East Devonport, some distance from Devonport.
B72	William Street; Biralee Road	Westbury		Frankford	19.7 km (12.2 mi)	
B73	Batman Highway	West Tamar Highway, Sidmouth	Batman Bridge	East Tamar Highway, Hillwood	11.1 km (6.9 mi)	
B74	Port Sorell Road; Wilmot Street	East Devonport	Wesley Vale, Northdown	Port Sorell	13.2 km (8.2 mi)	
B81	George Town Road; Lilydale Road; Main Road, Lilydale; Golconda Road; Listers Road; William Street	~~Launceston~~; Rocherlea	Lilydale	Scottsdale	59.9 km (37.2 mi)	George Town Road starts at the East Tamar Highway in the locality of Rocherlea, well outside Launceston.
B82	Bridport Road; Emily Street, Bridport; Edward Street; Waterhouse Road; Carr Street, Gladstone; Chaffey Street; Gladstone Road; Main Road, Pioneer	Bell Bay	Gladstone	Tasman Highway, Herrick	134.0 km (83.3 mi)	
B83	Pipers River Road	Underwood, Launceston	Karoola	Pipers River	31.2 km (19.4 mi)	Underwood is a suburb of Launceston.
B84	George Street; Bridport Road; Emily Street, Bridport	Scottsdale		Bridport	19.4 km (12.1 mi)	
B85	Main Street; Lady Barron Road; Palana Road	Lady Barron	Emita	Palana	72.6 km (45.1 mi)	On Flinders Island
B110	William Street; Hollow Tree Road	Hamilton	Hollow Tree	Bothwell	28.8 km (17.9 mi)	

=== C routes ===
These are significant minor roads.

==== C101 to C130 ====
Route	Component roads	From	Via	To	Length	Notes ↑ (Top)
C101	Oonah Road	Highclere		Oonah	24.0 km (14.9 mi)	
C102	Stowport Road; Natone Road; Upper Natone Road	Wivenhoe	Natone	Hampshire	34.2 km (21.3 mi)	
C103	Talunah Road	Hampshire		Tewkesbury	11.3 km (7.0 mi)	
C104	West Ridgley Road; Guide Road	Ridgley		Oonah Road, Tewkesbury	8.8 km (5.5 mi)	
C105	West Ridgley Road; South Prospect Road; Serpentine Road	West Ridgley		West Ridgley	4.2 km (2.6 mi)	West Ridgley Loop
C106	East Yolla Road	Murchison Highway, Yolla		Murchison Highway, Henrietta	9.8 km (6.1 mi)	East Yolla Road Loop
C108	West Park Grove; Mooreville Road; West Mooreville Road	Burnie	West Mooreville	Ridgley	14.5 km (9.0 mi)	
C109	East Cam Road	Camdale		~~West Mooreville~~; East Cam	3.2 km (2.0 mi)	East Cam Road ends in East Cam, some distance from the West Mooreville boundary.
C110	Mooreville Road	Park Grove	Mooreville	Ridgley	7.9 km (4.9 mi)	
C112	Massey–Greene Drive; Old Surrey Road	~~Wivenhoe~~; South Burnie		~~South Burnie~~; Romaine	4.3 km (2.7 mi)	**Serious Reference Error**; Massey-Greene Drive starts in South Burnie, not Wivenhoe, and Old Surrey Road ends at Ridgley Highway (B18) in the locality of Romaine.
C113	Minna Road	Heybridge		Stowport	8.6 km (5.3 mi)	
C114	Upper Stowport Road; Lottah Road	Stowport	Upper Stowport	Natone	9.9 km (6.2 mi)	
C115	South Riana Road	Upper Natone		South Riana	7.5 km (4.7 mi)	
C116	Creamery Road; West Pine Road; Camena Road	Penguin		Natone	14.6 km (9.1 mi)	
C117	River Avenue; Cuprona Road	Heybridge		West Pine	10.8 km (6.7 mi)	
C118	Nine Mile Road; Daveys Road	Howth		West Pine	7.4 km (4.6 mi)	
C123	Top Gawler Road	Gawler		Sprent	8.6 km (5.3 mi)	
C124	Isandula Road; Central Castra Road	Gawler		~~Nietta~~; Upper Castra	19.3 km (12.0 mi)	Central Castra Road ends in Upper Castra, over the Nietta boundary.
C125	Preston Road; South Preston Road	North Motton		Nietta	18.7 km (11.6 mi)	
C126	Preston–Castra Road	Preston		Central Castra	4.8 km (3.0 mi)	Central Castra is an unbounded locality within the locality of Castra.
C127	Raymond Road	Gunns Plains		Warringa	5.5 km (3.4 mi)	Warringa is an unbounded locality within the locality of Preston.
C128	Loongana Road; Leven Canyon Road	Nietta		Leven Canyon Picnic Area	8.9 km (5.5 mi)	Leven Canyon is a tourist destination in the locality of Nietta.
C129	South Nietta Road; Maxfields Road	Nietta		Nietta	6.7 km (4.2 mi)	South Nietta Loop

==== C131 to C160 ====
Route	Component roads	From	Via	To	Length	Notes ↑ (Top)
C132	Leith Road; Forth Road; Wilmot Road; Main Street; Cradle Mountain Road; Dove Lake Road	Leith		Cradle Mountain	81.0 km (50.3 mi)	Cradle Mountain Road, which becomes Dove Lake Road, includes a spur to Dove Lake. Cradle Mountain and Dove Lake are geographic features in the locality of Cradle Mountain. Belvoir Road continues to the Murchison Highway in the locality of West Coast.
C132	Dove Lake Road; Cradle Mountain Road; Belvoir Road	Cradle Mountain		Murchison Highway	38.5 km (23.9 mi)	Cradle Mountain Road, which becomes Dove Lake Road, includes a spur to Dove Lake. Cradle Mountain and Dove Lake are geographic features in the locality of Cradle Mountain. Belvoir Road continues to the Murchison Highway in the locality of West Coast.
C133	Spellmans Road; Back Road	Upper Castra		Wilmot	9.0 km (5.6 mi)	
C135	Buxtons Road; Lake Barrington Road	Wilmot	Lake Barrington	Wilmot	5.7 km (3.5 mi)	Lake Barrington Loop (Route C135) provides access to Lake Barrington Campground in the locality of Wilmot.
C136	Spring Street; Claude Road; Cethana Road	Sheffield	Cethana	Moina	28.8 km (17.9 mi)	
C137	Paradise Road; Union Bridge Road	Sheffield		Mole Creek	20.3 km (12.6 mi)	
C138	Olivers Road; Mersey Forest Road	Cethana		~~Mole Creek~~; Mayberry	27.3 km (17.0 mi)	Mersey Forest Road ends in Mayberry, some distance from the Mole Creek boundary.
C140	Staverton Road	~~Sheffield~~; West Kentish	Roland	Cethana	12.3 km (7.6 mi)	Staverton Road starts in West Kentish, some distance from the Sheffield boundary.
C141	West Kentish Road	Sheffield	West Kentish	Lake Barrington	12.6 km (7.8 mi)	Lake Barrington is a lake. Route C141 ends at the lake in the locality of West Kentish.
C142	Eastland Drive; Main Street; Crescent Street; Kings Parade; Hobbs Parade; South Road; Knights Road	Bass Highway, Ulverstone	Ulverstone	Bass Highway, West Ulverstone	5.4 km (3.4 mi)	Route through Ulverstone
C143	Bartington Road; Nowhere Else Road	Barrington		West Kentish	9.0 km (5.6 mi)	
C144	Lower Barrington Road; Lake Paloona Road; Paloona Dam Road; Paloona Road	Lower Barrington		Paloona Bridge, Kindred	7.6 km (4.7 mi)	
C145	Lower Barrington Road; Paloona Road; Melrose Road; Bellamy Road; Forthside Road	Lower Barrington		Forth	13.3 km (8.3 mi)	
C146	Tarleton Road; Sheffield Road; Melrose Road	Tarleton		Melrose	9.3 km (5.8 mi)	
C147	Melrose Road	Lower Barrington		Melrose	5.8 km (3.6 mi)	
C150	Nook Road; High Street	McGuinness Corner, Acacia Hills		Sheffield	13.9 km (8.6 mi)	
C153	Native Rock Road; Native Plains Road	Railton		~~Latrobe~~; Sassafras	13.1 km (8.1 mi)	Native Plains Road ends in Sassafras, over the Latrobe boundary.
C154	Merseylea Road	Merseylea		~~Latrobe~~; Railton	4.8 km (3.0 mi)	Merseylea Road ends in Railton, some distance from the Latrobe boundary.
C156	Bridle Track Road	Kimberley		Sheffield	11.2 km (7.0 mi)	
C157	Beulah Road	Stoodley		Paradise	12.4 km (7.7 mi)	
C159	Dynans Bridge Road; Lower Beulah Road	Weegena		~~Sheffield~~; Kimberley	17.9 km (11.1 mi)	Lower Beulah Road ends in Kimberley, some distance from the Sheffield boundary.
C160	Weegena Road	Dunorlan	Weegena	Kimberley	12.5 km (7.8 mi)	

==== C161 to C199 ====
Route	Component roads	From	Via	To	Length	Notes ↑ (Top)
C161	Dunorlan Road	Moltema		~~Deloraine~~; Dunorlan	7.5 km (4.7 mi)	Dunorlan Road ends in Dunorlan, well outside the Deloraine boundary.
C163	Bengeo Road	Red Hills		Elizabeth Town	6.8 km (4.2 mi)	
C164	Montana Road	Red Hills		Montana	11.1 km (6.9 mi)	
C166	Long Ridge Road; Montana Road; Cheshunt Road	Highland Lakes Road, Deloraine		~~Caveside~~; Western Creek	18.4 km (11.4 mi)	Cheshunt Road ends in Western Creek, just over the Caveside boundary.
C167	Meander Road; Main Road; Huntsman Road	Highland Lakes Road, Deloraine		Meander	9.2 km (5.7 mi)	
C168	Dairy Plains Road; Western Creek Road	Needles		Caveside	19.5 km (12.1 mi)	
C169	Caveside Road; Gardner Street; Sorell Street	Mole Creek	Caveside	Chudleigh	15.3 km (9.5 mi)	
C170	Mayberry Road	~~Mole Creek Road~~; Liena Road, Mayberry		Mayberry	3.9 km (2.4 mi)	Road to Marakoopa Caves. Mole Creek Road (B12) becomes Liena Road west of Mole Creek.
C171	Mersey Forest Road	~~Mole Creek~~; Mersey Forest		Rowallan Dam, Mersey Forest	18.3 km (11.4 mi)	The C171 section of Mersey Forest Road starts in the locality of Mersey Forest, some distance from the Mole Creek boundary.
C173	Victoria Valley Road	Bronte	Victoria Valley	Ouse	51.6 km (32.1 mi)	Bronte is an unbounded locality in the locality of Bronte Park, where Victoria Valley Road starts.
C176	Strickland Road	~~Dee Lagoon~~; Victoria Valley	Strickland	Ouse	17.6 km (10.9 mi)	Strickland Road starts in Victoria Valley, over the Dee boundary and some distance from Dee Lagoon.
C177	Bashan Road	~~Ouse~~; Victoria Valley		Waddamana	24.7 km (15.3 mi)	Bashan Road starts in Victoria Valley, some distance from the Ouse boundary.
C178	Waddamana Road	~~Miena~~; Steppes	Waddamana	Bothwell	41.5 km (25.8 mi)	Waddamana Road starts in Steppes, over the Miena boundary.
C179	Tor Hill Road; Meadsfield Road; Schaw Street; Wentworth Street	Ouse		Bothwell	35.0 km (21.7 mi)	
C181	Marked Tree Road	~~Bothwell~~; Hollow Tree		Gretna	16.2 km (10.1 mi)	Marked Tree Road starts in Hollow Tree, over the Bothwell boundary.
C182	Thousand Acre Lane; Pelham Road	Hamilton		Elderslie	19.1 km (11.9 mi)	
C183	Bluff Road	Gretna		Elderslie	18.0 km (11.2 mi)	
C184	Black Hills Road; Black River Road	Rosegarland		New Norfolk	17.3 km (10.7 mi)	
C185	Elderslie Road; Clifton Vale Road	Brighton	Elderslie	Dysart	44.9 km (27.9 mi)	
C186	Black Brush Road	Mangalore		Broadmarsh	7.5 km (4.7 mi)	
C189	~~Leith Road~~; Braddons Lookout Road	Bass Highway, Leith		Forth	5.1 km (3.2 mi)	Braddons Lookout. All of Leith Road is in route C132.
C192	Stotts Road	~~Natone~~; Camena		Riana	7.4 km (4.6 mi)	Stotts Road starts in Camena, just over the Natone boundary.
C193	Lake St Clair Road	Derwent Bridge		Lake St Clair	5.0 km (3.1 mi)	
C194	Main Street, Kempton; Sugarloaf Road	Kempton		Clifton Vale Road, Dysart	7.5 km (4.7 mi)	
C195	Brighton Road	Midland Highway, Bridgewater		Midland Highway, Pontville	5.0 km (3.1 mi)	Brighton Village Loop

==== C201 to C230 ====
Route	Component roads	From	Via	To	Length	Notes ↑ (Top)
C201	Old Grassy Road	Lymwood		Currie	13.5 km (8.4 mi)	On King Island
C202	Fraser Road; The Esplanade; Forrest Street; Millwood Road; Yarra Creek Road	Currie	Naracoopa, Yarra Creek	Lymwood	45.2 km (28.1 mi)	On King Island
C203	Pegarah Road	Pegarah		Naracoopa	11.7 km (7.3 mi)	On King Island
C213	Comeback Road	Bass Highway, Marrawah		Bass Highway, Redpa	9.7 km (6.0 mi)	
C214	Arthur River Road; Temma Road; Rebecca Road; Blackwater Road	Marrawah		Kanunnah Bridge	62.3 km (38.7 mi)	Kanunnah Bridge is a bridge over the Arthur River in the locality of Roger River.
C215	Nelson Street; Davis Street; Montagu Road; West Montagu Road; Harvus River Road	Smithton		Marrawah	47.9 km (29.8 mi)	
C217	Scotchtown Road; Trowutta Road	Smithton		~~Edith Creek~~; Scotchtown	7.7 km (4.8 mi)	The C217 section of Trowutta Road ends at its intersection with the B22 route in Scotchtown, well outside the Edith Creek boundary.
C218	Trowutta Road; Reids Road; Tayatea Road; Rapid River Road; Sumac Road	Edith Creek	Roger River, Trowutta	Kanunnah Bridge	64.6 km (40.1 mi)	This is a loop road which, after crossing the Arthur River at Kanunnah Bridge, completes the loop further north in the locality of Roger River.
C218	Sumac Road; Roger River Road	Kanunnah Bridge		Roger River	15.3 km (9.5 mi)	
C219	South Road; Mengha Road	Edith Creek		North Forest	33.4 km (20.8 mi)	North Forest is an unbounded locality partly within the locality of Forest. Mengha Road passes through North Forest and ends at the Bass Highway at the northernmost point of Forest.
C220	Irishtown Road; Johns Hill Road	Irishtown		Alcomie	2.8 km (1.7 mi)	
C221	Backline Road	Wiltshire	Forest	Smithton	11.1 km (6.9 mi)	
C223	Maguires Road	Nabageena		Trowutta	10.0 km (6.2 mi)	
C225	Mawbanna Road; Dip Falls Road	Black River	Mawbanna	Dip Falls	26.4 km (16.4 mi)	Dip Falls is a waterfall within the locality of Mawbanna.
C227	Rocky Cape Road	Bass Highway, Rocky Cape		Rocky Cape Lighthouse	5.8 km (3.6 mi)	Road to Rocky Cape National Park. Rocky Cape Lighthouse and National Park are in the locality of Rocky Cape.
C229	Myalla Road; Meunna Road; Preolenna Road	Sisters Creek	Myalla, Meunna, Preolenna	~~Wynyard~~; Flowerdale	57.7 km (35.9 mi)	Preolenna Road ends in Flowerdale, just over the Wynyard boundary.
C230	Lapoinya Road	Moorleah	Lapoinya	Milabena	12.6 km (7.8 mi)	Lapoinya loop

==== C231 to C299 ====
Route	Component roads	From	Via	To	Length	Notes ↑ (Top)
C231	Robin Hill Road; Gates Road	Flowerdale		Boat Harbour	2.9 km (1.8 mi)	
C232	Port Road	Bass Highway, Boat Harbour		Boat Harbour Beach	1.4 km (0.9 mi)	
C233	Sisters Beach Road	Boat Harbour		Sisters Beach	9.0 km (5.6 mi)	
C234	Saunders Street; Table Cape Road; Lighthouse Road	Wynyard		Table Cape Lighthouse	6.5 km (4.0 mi)	Table Cape loop
C234	Lighthouse Road; Table Cape Road; Tollymore Road	Table Cape Lighthouse		Boat Harbour	8.2 km (5.1 mi)	Table Cape loop
C235	Calder Road; Kellatier Road; Lowries Road	Wynyard	Calder	~~Olinda~~; Oldina	19.7 km (12.2 mi)	Incorrect spelling of Oldina.
C236	Takone Road	Henrietta		West Takone	33.2 km (20.6 mi)	Google Maps shows route C236 continuing from West Takone to Meunna on Farquhars Road and Pruana Road.
C237	~~Olinda~~ Oldina Road	Wynyard		~~Henrietta~~; Takone	20.8 km (12.9 mi)	Oldina Road ends in Takone, just over the Henrietta boundary.
C239	Deep Creek Road	Wynyard		Upper Mount Hicks	12.9 km (8.0 mi)	Upper Mount Hicks is an unbounded locality within the locality of Mount Hicks.
C240	Old Bass Highway; Goldie Street; Inglis Street	Doctors Rocks		Wynyard	8.6 km (5.3 mi)	
C241	Seabrook Road; Malakoff Street; Pellisier Street; Raglan Street	Lower Mount Hicks		Somerset	8.1 km (5.0 mi)	Lower Mount Hicks is an unbounded locality within the locality of Mount Hicks.
C243	Nunns Road	Upper Mount Hicks		Elliott	7.0 km (4.3 mi)	Upper Mount Hicks is an unbounded locality within the locality of Mount Hicks.
C244	Johnsons Road	Yolla		Oldina Road, Yolla	4.5 km (2.8 mi)	
C247	Corinna Road	Savage River		Corinna	21.8 km (13.5 mi)	
C248	Trial Harbour Road; Ernies Drive	Zeehan		Trial Harbour	18.3 km (11.4 mi)	
C249	Main Street; Heemskirk Road; Corinna Road; Norfolk Road	Zeehan		~~Balfour~~; West Coast	128 km (79.5 mi)	Balfour is an unbounded locality in the locality of West Coast. Norfolk Road ends in West Coast, well away from Balfour.
C250	Harvey Street; Ocean Beach Road	Strahan		Ocean Beach	5.2 km (3.2 mi)	Ocean Beach is a beach in the locality of Strahan
C251	Macquarie Heads Road	Strahan		Macquarie Heads	12.2 km (7.6 mi)	
C252	Pieman Road; Heemskirk Road	Tullah		Reece Dam, West Coast	59.7 km (37.1 mi)	

==== C301 to C330 ====
Route	Component roads	From	Via	To	Length	Notes ↑ (Top)
C301	Arthur Street; Royal George Road; Old Coach Road	Avoca		Cranbrook	52.2 km (32.4 mi)	
C302	Coles Bay Road; Freycinet Drive	Llandaff, Bicheno		Coles Bay	27.2 km (16.9 mi)	Llandaff is an unbounded locality partly in the locality of Bicheno.
C305	Chiswick Road; Church Street; Roseneath Road; Bridge Street; Beaufront Road; Bond Street; Tooms Lake Road	Ross		Tooms Lake	35.2 km (21.9 mi)	Tooms Lake is a lake within the locality of Tooms Lake.
C306	Stonehouse Road	Lemont		Tooms Lake	12.8 km (8.0 mi)	
C307	York Plains Road; Lemont Road	St Peters Pass, Oatlands		Lemont	31.9 km (19.8 mi)	St Peters Pass is a geographical feature in the locality of Oatlands.
C309	Nala Road	Andover		~~Pawtella~~; York Plains	12.0 km (7.5 mi)	Nala Road ends in York Plains, just over the Pawtella boundary.
C310	Inglewood Road; Stonehenge Road; Woodsdale Road	Oatlands		~~Whitefoord~~; Baden	40.3 km (25.0 mi)	Woodsdale Road ends in Baden, just over the Whitefoord boundary.
C311	Woodsdale Road	Woodsdale		Levendale	3.8 km (2.4 mi)	
C312	High Street; Dudley Street; Tunnack Road; New Country Marsh Road; Woodsdale Road	Oatlands	Tunnack, Levendale	Runnymede	51.1 km (31.8 mi)	
C313	Rhyndaston Road	Colebrook		Stonor	15.3 km (9.5 mi)	
C314	Stonor Road	Jericho		Baden	14.7 km (9.1 mi)	
C315	Black Gate Road	Stonor		Mount Seymour	3.8 km (2.4 mi)	
C316	Lovely Banks Road	Melton Mowbray		Colebrook	12.2 km (7.6 mi)	
C317	Cutting Grass Road	Levendale		Buckland Road, Levendale	8.4 km (5.2 mi)	
C318	Woodsdale Road; Buckland Road	Whitefoord		Buckland	31.4 km (19.5 mi)	
C319	Freestone Point Road	Triabunna		Spring Bay, Triabunna	5.2 km (3.2 mi)	Woodchip mill. Spring Bay is a bay almost completely surrounded by the locality of Triabunna. Route C319 starts and ends in Triabunna.
C320	Charles Street; Rheban Road	Orford		Rheban	14.3 km (8.9 mi)	
C321	Andrew Street; Tea Tree Road	Brighton		Campania	16.8 km (10.4 mi)	
C322	Middle Tea Tree Road; Colebrook Road	Tea Tree		Richmond	9.3 km (5.8 mi)	
C323	Back Tea Tree Road; Grass Tree Hill Road; Malcolms Hut Road	Brighton		~~Cambridge~~; Richmond	13.9 km (8.6 mi)	Malcolms Hut Road ends in Richmond, some distance from the Cambridge boundary.
C324	Grass Tree Hill Road	Risdon		Richmond	12.9 km (8.0 mi)	
C325	Briggs Road	Brighton		Honeywood	3.9 km (2.4 mi)	
C326	Cove Hill Road; Briggs Road; Old Beach Road	~~Brighton~~; Bridgewater	~~Baskerville~~; Honeywood	Old Beach	9.9 km (6.2 mi)	Cove Hill Road starts at Bridgewater, some distance from the Brighton boundary, and Baskerville is not in the Placenames reference.
C327	Baskerville Road	~~Honeywood~~; Old Beach	~~Baskerville~~	Old Beach	6.5 km (4.0 mi)	Baskerville Road starts in Old Beach, over the Honeywood boundary, and Baskerville is not in the Placenames reference.
C328	Cambridge Road; Mount Rumney Road	Cambridge		Mount Rumney	2.2 km (1.4 mi)	
C329	Pass Road; Cambridge Road	Rokeby		Mornington	5.5 km (3.4 mi)	
C330	Acton Road	Lauderdale		Cambridge	9.5 km (5.9 mi)	

==== C331 to C399 ====
Route	Component roads	From	Via	To	Length	Notes ↑ (Top)
C331	Nugent Road	Sorell		Nugent	18.9 km (11.7 mi)	
C332	Pawleena Road; Shrub End Road	Sorell	Pawleena	Wattle Hill	10.8 km (6.7 mi)	
C333	Delmore Road	Forcett		Wattle Hill	6.8 km (4.2 mi)	
C334	Old Forcett Road; Carlton River Road; Sugarloaf Road; Fulham Road	Forcett	Lewisham, Carlton, Primrose Sands	Dunalley	24.7 km (15.3 mi)	
C335	Nugent Road; Kellevie Road	Buckland		Copping	29.2 km (18.1 mi)	
C336	Bream Creek Road	~~Copping~~; Bream Creek	Bream Creek	Kellevie	9.4 km (5.8 mi)	Bream Creek Road starts in Bream Creek, just over the Copping boundary.
C337	Marion Bay Road; Bay Road	Copping	Marion Bay	Dunalley	12.4 km (7.7 mi)	
C338	Blowhole Road; Tasmans Arch Road	Eaglehawk Neck		Blowhole, Tasmans Arch	4.1 km (2.5 mi)	To Tasmans Arch car park via Doo Town.
C340	Lewisham Road; Lewisham Scenic Drive	~~Lewisham~~; Forcett	Lewisham	Dodges Ferry	5.5 km (3.4 mi)	Lewisham Road starts in Forcett, well beyond the Lewisham boundary.
C341	Saltwater River Road; Coal Mine Road	Premaydena		Coal Mines Historic Site	11.4 km (7.1 mi)	Coal Mines Historic Site is in the locality of Saltwater River.
C342	Eldon Road; Rhyndaston Road	Tunnack		Colebrook	12.6 km (7.8 mi)	
C343	Nubeena Back Road	Koonya		Nubeena	8.5 km (5.3 mi)	
C344	Fortescue Bay Road	Tasman Highway, Port Arthur		Fortescue Bay	11.6 km (7.2 mi)	Fortescue Bay is a bay and an unbounded locality within the locality of Fortescue.
C347	Safety Cove Road	Port Arthur		Safety Cove, Remarkable Cave	6.2 km (3.9 mi)	Safety Cove and Remarkable Cave are within the locality of Port Arthur.
C349	Sugarloaf Road; Primrose Sands Road	Forcett	Carlton River	Primrose Sands	10.8 km (6.7 mi)	
C350	Fingerpost Main Road	Campania		Orielton	7.3 km (4.5 mi)	
C351	Bridge Street; Wellington Street; Brinktop Road	Richmond	Penna	Sorell	10.1 km (6.3 mi)	

==== C401 to C499 ====
Route	Component roads	From	Via	To	Length	Notes ↑ (Top)
C401	St Leonard’s Road; Blessington Road; Upper Blessington Road; Gunns Road; Upper Esk Road	St Leonards		Mathinna	85.8 km (53.3 mi)	
C402	Hobart Road	Breadalbane Roundabout		Kings Meadows	6.6 km (4.1 mi)	
C403	Kings Meadow Link; Johnson Road; St Leonard’s Road; Abels Hill Road	Kings Meadows		Tasman Highway, St Leonards	7.5 km (4.7 mi)	
C404	Mount Barrow Road	~~St Patricks River~~; Nunamara		Mount Barrow	16.1 km (10.0 mi)	St Patricks River is an unbounded locality within the locality of Targa. Mount Barrow Road starts in Nunamara, just over the Targa boundary. Mount Barrow is a mountain in Nunamara.
C405	Camden Hill Road; Camden Road	Targa		Upper Blessington	29.9 km (18.6 mi)	
C406	South Springfield Road; Ten Mile Track	Springfield		South Springfield	2.3 km (1.4 mi)	
C407	Upper Brid Road; Ten Mile Track	South Springfield		Tonganah	11.3 km (7.0 mi)	
C411	Relbia Road	Youngtown		Relbia	8.3 km (5.2 mi)	
C412	Barclay Street; White Hills Road; Cowley Road	Evandale		White Hills	10.0 km (6.2 mi)	
C413	Russell Street; Logan Road; Sawpit Hill Road	Evandale		Blessington	21.8 km (13.5 mi)	
C414	Sawpit Hill Road	Blessington Road, White Hills		Logan Road, White Hills	2.3 km (1.4 mi)	Sawpit Hill Road link
C415	Musselboro Road; Burns Creek Road	Blessington Road, Blessington	Musselboro, Burns Creek	Blessington Road, Upper Blessington	12.3 km (7.6 mi)	
C416	High Street; Nile Road; Glen Esk Road	Evandale	Nile	Conara	41.3 km (25.7 mi)	
C417	Clarence Street; Perth Mill Road	Perth		Western Junction	5.0 km (3.1 mi)	
C418	Clarendon Station Road; Clarendon Lodge Road	~~Clarendon~~; Nile		~~Clarendon~~; Evandale	4.3 km (2.7 mi)	Clarendon loop. Clarendon is an unbounded locality partly within the locality of Nile. Clarendon Station Road starts in Nile, and Clarendon Lodge Road ends in Evandale.
C419	Bryants Lane	~~Clarendon~~; Nile		Deddington	9.6 km (6.0 mi)	Clarendon is an unbounded locality partly within the locality of Nile. Bryant's Lane starts in Nile.
C420	Deddington Road	Nile		Blessington	25.0 km (15.5 mi)	
C421	Upper Scamander Road; Catos Road	Scamander		~~Mount Nicholas~~; St Marys	30.5 km (19.0 mi)	Mount Nicholas is a mountain within the locality of St Marys.
C423	Carisbrook Lane; Main Street; Ringarooma Road; New River Road; Mathinna Plains Road	Branxholm	Legerwood, Ringarooma	Mathinna	42.4 km (26.3 mi)	
C424	Legerwood Lane	Branxholm		Ringarooma	7.1 km (4.4 mi)	
C425	Blundell Street; Mount Paris Dam Road	Weldborough		Branxholm	18.8 km (11.7 mi)	
C426	West Maurice Road; Cottons Bridge Road; East Maurice Road; Barnett Road	Legerwood		Talawa	10.0 km (6.2 mi)	
C427	East Maurice Road	Ringarooma		Talawa	4.6 km (2.9 mi)	
C428	St Columba Road	Pyengana		St Columba Falls, Pyengana	10.8 km (6.7 mi)	
C429	High Street; Dunn Street; Mangana Street; Golden Gate Road; Tower Hill Road	Mathinna		Fingal	24.5 km (15.2 mi)	
C430	Mount Nicholas Road; Barnes Road; Evercreech Road	~~Mount Nicholas~~; St Marys		Mathinna	22.5 km (14.0 mi)	Mount Nicholas is a mountain within the locality of St Marys.
C432	Ben Lomond Road	~~Wattle Corner~~; Upper Blessington		Ben Lomond National Park	17.4 km (10.8 mi)	Wattle Corner is a road bend on Blessington Road in Upper Blessington. The C432 route ends at the point where Ben Lomond Road enters the national park.

==== C501 to C599 ====
Route	Component roads	From	Via	To	Length	Notes ↑ (Top)
C501	East Barrack Street; Quamby Brook Road; Osmaston Road; Mary Street; Dexter Street; Mary Street	Deloraine	Osmaston	Westbury	19.5 km (12.1 mi)	
C502	Exton Road; Bogan Road; Golden Valley Road	Exton		Golden Valley	13.8 km (8.6 mi)	
C503	Quamby Brook Road	Deloraine		Quamby Brook	6.7 km (4.2 mi)	
C504	Bogan Road	Golden Valley		Bogan Gap	6.3 km (3.9 mi)	Bogan Gap is a pass (between mountains) in the locality of Golden Valley.
C505	Cluan Road	Westbury		Bracknell	12.9 km (8.0 mi)	
C507	Hagley Station Lane; Black Hills Road; Whitemore Road	Hagley		Bracknell	13.2 km (8.2 mi)	
C508	Whitemore Road	Carrick		Whitemore	8.7 km (5.4 mi)	
C510	Glenore Road; Adelphi Road	Cluan		Whitemore	6.4 km (4.0 mi)	
C511	Oaks Road; Elizabeth Street	Carrick		Bracknell	14.5 km (9.0 mi)	
C513	Church Street; Bishopsbourne Road; Liffey Road; Bracknell Lane; Louisa Street; Maria Street; Bracknell Road; Gulf Road; Bogan Road; Riversdale Road	Carrick	Bishopsbourne Bracknell	Liffey Falls	43.0 km (26.7 mi)	The Placenames Tasmania reference (and Google Maps) shows Riversdale Road from Highland Lakes Road (A5) to the C513 route (as described in the Road Routes reference) as part of route C513. Liffey Falls is a waterfall in the locality of Liffey.
C514	Liffey Road; Blackwood Creek Road	Bracknell		Blackwood Creek	19.4 km (12.1 mi)	
C515	Saundridge Road	~~Poatina~~; Cressy		Cressy	14.6 km (9.1 mi)	Saundridge Road starts in the locality of Cressy, outside the Poatina boundary.
C516	Elphinstone Road	Bracknell		Cressy	9.9 km (6.2 mi)	
C517	Green Rises Road	Bracknell		Cressy	10.8 km (6.7 mi)	
C518	Bishopsbourne Road; Wilmores Lane	Bishopsbourne		Longford	10.9 km (6.8 mi)	
C519	Bishopsbourne Road	Bishopsbourne		~~Perth~~; Longford	5.0 km (3.1 mi)	Bishopsbourne Road ends in the locality of Longford, we'll away from the Perth boundary.
C520	Wellington Street; Woolmers Lane; Panshanger Road; Chintah Road; Mount Joy Road; Valleyfield Road	Longford	~~Mount Joy~~; Cressy	Campbell Town	49.1 km (30.5 mi)	Mount Joy is not in the Placenames reference. Mount Joy Road passes through the locality of Cressy.
C521	Woolmers Lane	Midland Highway, Perth		Longford	5.8 km (3.6 mi)	
C522	Pedder Street; Macquarie Road	Campbell Town		Cressy	44.2 km (27.5 mi)	
C525	Arthurs Lake Road	Flintstone	Wilburville	Arthurs Lake	12.4 km (7.7 mi)	
C526	Tunbridge Tier Road	Tunbridge		Interlaken	23.6 km (14.7 mi)	
C527	Interlaken Road	Oatlands		Steppes	52.6 km (32.7 mi)	
C528	Market Place; Dennistoun Road	Bothwell		Lake Sorell	32.9 km (20.4 mi)	Lake Sorell is a lake partly in the locality of Interlaken.
C529	Lower Marshes Road	Apsley		Jericho	22.5 km (14.0 mi)	
C531	Pateena Road	~~Prospect~~; Travellers Rest		Longford	11.0 km (6.8 mi)	Pateena Road starts in Travellers Rest, some distance from Prospect.

==== C601 to C630 ====
Route	Component roads	From	Via	To	Length	Notes ↑ (Top)
C601	Fourteen Mile Road	Tarraleah		Bronte	20.0 km (12.4 mi)	Bronte is an unbounded locality within the locality of Bronte Park.
C602	Laughing Jack Lagoon Road	Fourteen Mile Road, Bronte Park		Laughing Jack Lagoon Dam	9.2 km (5.7 mi)	Laughing Jack Lagoon and Dam are in Bronte Park.
C603	Butlers Gorge Road	Tarraleah		Butlers Gorge	16.6 km (10.3 mi)	
C604	Long Spur Road	~~Liapootah~~; Wayatinah		Wayatinah Power Station	8.5 km (5.3 mi)	Liapootah is an unbounded locality within the locality of Tarraleah. Long Spur Road starts in Wayatinah, over the Tarraleah boundary.
C606	Lake Repulse Road	Ouse		Repulse Dam, Ouse	6.7 km (4.2 mi)	
C607	Scotts Peak Dam Road	Gordon River Road, Florentine		Scotts Peak Dam, Southwest	35.6 km (22.1 mi)	
C608	Ellendale Road	Westerway		Ouse	22.8 km (14.2 mi)	
C609	Lake Dobson Road	National Park		Mount Field	15.4 km (9.6 mi)	
C610	Uxbridge Road; Moogara Road; Plenty Valley Road; Glenfern Road	Bushy Park	Feilton	New Norfolk	27.5 km (17.1 mi)	Feilton is an unbounded locality in the locality of Moogara.
C613	Blair Street; George Street; Humphrey Street; Lachlan Road	New Norfolk		Lachlan	8.7 km (5.4 mi)	
C615	Molesworth Road; Glenlusk Road; Berriedale Road	Sorell Creek	Molesworth	Berriedale	16.2 km (10.1 mi)	
C616	Pillinger Drive; Pinnacle Road	Fern Tree		kunanyi/Mt Wellington	11.6 km (7.2 mi)	Mount Wellington is a mountain in the locality of Wellington Park.
C617	Mountain River Road	Grove		Mountain River	5.7 km (3.5 mi)	
C618	Crabtree Road	Grove		Crabtree	7.8 km (4.8 mi)	
C619	Glen Huon Road; North Huon Road; Agnes Street; Marguerite Street; Lollara Road	Huonville	Ranelagh, Judbury, Glen Huon	Grove	27.1 km (16.8 mi)	
C620	Wilmot Road; Louisa Street; Agnes Street	Huonville		Ranelagh	2.8 km (1.7 mi)	
C621	Pelverata Road	Sandfly		Woodstock	20.5 km (12.7 mi)	
C622	Sandfly Road	Margate		Longley	8.0 km (5.0 mi)	
C623	Beach Road; Roslyn Avenue; Brightwater Road; Howden Road	Kingston	Blackmans Bay	Margate	11.7 km (7.3 mi)	
C624	Tinderbox Road	Blackmans Bay	Tinderbox	Howden	13.8 km (8.6 mi)	
C625	Bruny Island Main Road; Nebraska Road; Killora Road	Route B66, North Bruny	Dennes Point	Killora	22.8 km (14.2 mi)	On Bruny Island
C626	Nicholls Rivulet Road	Oyster Cove		Cygnet	17.7 km (11.0 mi)	
C627	Woodbridge Hill Road	Woodbridge		Gardners Bay	11.9 km (7.4 mi)	
C628	Simpsons Bay Road	Alonnah		Simpsons Bay	5.5 km (3.4 mi)	On Bruny Island
C629	Bruny Island Main Road; Lighthouse Road	Lunawanna		Cape Bruny, South Bruny	18.5 km (11.5 mi)	On Bruny Island. Google maps also include Coolangatta Road and Cloudy Bay Road from Adventure Bay to Lunawanna in route C629.
C630	Adventure Bay Road	~~Alonnah~~; Route B66, South Bruny		Adventure Bay	9.9 km (6.2 mi)	On Bruny Island. Adventure Bay Road starts in South Bruny, well outside the Alonnah boundary.

==== C631 to C699 ====
Route	Component roads	From	Via	To	Length	Notes ↑ (Top)
C631	Arve Road	Geeveston		Tahune AirWalk, Southwest	15.3 km (9.5 mi)	
C632	Arve Road; Hartz Road	Geeveston		Hartz Mountains National Park, Southwest	26.3 km (16.3 mi)	
C634	Scotts Road	~~Port Huon~~; Geeveston		Cairns Bay	4.1 km (2.5 mi)	Scotts Road starts in Geeveston, outside the Port Huon boundary.
C635	Hastings Caves Road	Southport		Hastings Caves, Hastings	12.0 km (7.5 mi)	
C636	Lune River Road; South Cape Road; Cockle Creek Road	~~Lune River~~; Hastings		Catamaran, Recherche	23.7 km (14.7 mi)	Lune River Road starts in Hastings, outside the Lune River boundary.
C637	Police Point Road	Glendevie		Police Point	6.0 km (3.7 mi)	
C638	Esperance Coast Road; Kent Beach Road; Station Road	Surges Bay		Dover	22.6 km (14.0 mi)	
C639	Cygnet Coast Road; Lymington Road	Cradoc	Wattle Grove, Lymington	Cygnet	27.0 km (16.8 mi)	
C640	Golden Valley Road; Wattle Grove Road	Cygnet		Wattle Grove	7.9 km (4.9 mi)	
C641	Silver Hills Road	Cygnet		~~Glaziers Bay~~; Lower Wattle Grove	6.8 km (4.2 mi)	Silver Hills Road ends in Lower Wattle Grove, just outside the Glaziers Bay boundary.
C643	Proctors Road; Olinda Grove; Nelson Road	Southern Outlet, Mount Nelson		Mount Nelson Signal Station	3.4 km (2.1 mi)	
C644	Cloudy Bay Road	Lunawanna		Cloudy Bay, South Bruny	8.4 km (5.2 mi)	On Bruny Island
C645	Cross Road; Lucaston Road	Crabtree		~~Ranelagh~~; Lucaston	5.9 km (3.7 mi)	Lucaston Road ends in Lucaston, just outside the Ranelagh boundary.
C646	Forsters Rivulet Road	Lymington		Wattle Grove	5.5 km (3.4 mi)	

==== C701 to C730 ====
Route	Component roads	From	Via	To	Length	Notes ↑ (Top)
C701	Pardoe Road; Mill Road; Port Sorell Road; Wesley Vale Road	East Devonport	Wesley Vale	Latrobe	10.1 km (6.3 mi)	
C702	Bradshaw Street; Moriarty Road	Latrobe		Moriarty	6.4 km (4.0 mi)	
C703	Wrights Lane	Moriarty		Port Sorell	4.8 km (3.0 mi)	
C704	Oppenheims Road	Latrobe		Harford	8.1 km (5.0 mi)	
C705	Bonneys Lane	Moriarty		Harford	2.7 km (1.7 mi)	
C706	East Sassafras Road; Greens Creek Road	~~Latrobe~~; Sassafras	East Sassafras	Harford	7.1 km (4.4 mi)	East Sassafras Road starts in Sassafras, just over the Latrobe boundary.
C707	Appleby Road	Thirlstane		Port Sorell	3.8 km (2.4 mi)	
C708	Woodbury Lane; Parkers Ford Road; Alexander Street; Dumbleton Street; Hawley Esplanade	Harford		Hawley Beach	9.5 km (5.9 mi)	
C709	Squeaking Point Road; Parkers Ford Road; Charles Street	Thirlstane		Squeaking Point	5.9 km (3.7 mi)	
C710	East Parkham Road; Weetah Road	Parkham	Weetah	Deloraine	13.4 km (8.3 mi)	
C711	Parkham Road	Elizabeth Town		Parkham	7.4 km (4.6 mi)	
C713	Chapel Road	Sassafras		Harford	7.9 km (4.9 mi)	
C714	Priestleys Lane	Birralee Road, Birralee		Frankford Road, Frankford	10.0 km (6.2 mi)	Birralee loop
C715	Holwell Road; Kellys Lookout Road	Frankford		Beaconsfield	20.1 km (12.5 mi)	
C716	Nettlefolds Road; South Winkleigh Road; Hoods Road; Lamont Road	Holwell		Glengarry	12.3 km (7.6 mi)	
C717	Flowery Gully Road; Winkleigh Road	Beaconsfield	Winkleigh	Exeter	20.9 km (13.0 mi)	
C718	Glengarry Road	Glengarry		Winkleigh	4.0 km (2.5 mi)	
C720	Greens Beach Road	Beaconsfield		York Town	4.5 km (2.8 mi)	
C721	Badger Head Road	York Town		Badger Head	9.9 km (6.2 mi)	
C722	Clarence Point Road; Bevic Road	York Town	Clarence Point	Kelso	6.5 km (4.0 mi)	
C724	Rowella Road; West Bay Road	Sidmouth		Rowella	7.8 km (4.8 mi)	
C725	Spring Hill Road	~~Beaconsfield~~; Sidmouth		~~Batman Bridge~~; Sidmouth	1.5 km (0.9 mi)	Spring Hill Road starts and ends in Sidmouth.
C727	Hillwood Jetty Road; Craigburn Road	East Tamar Highway	Hillwood	Batman Highway	9.5 km (5.9 mi)	
C728	Deviot Road; Gravelly Beach Road	Batman Bridge		Blackwall	13.5 km (8.4 mi)	
C729	Motor Road	~~Exeter~~; Loira		Deviot	3.9 km (2.4 mi)	Motor Road starts in the locality of Loira, some distance from the Exeter boundary.
C730	Long Plains Road	Exeter		~~Glengarry~~; Bridgenorth	8.2 km (5.1 mi)	Long Plains Road ends in the locality of Bridgenorth, a long way from Glengarry.

==== C731 to C799 ====
Route	Component roads	From	Via	To	Length	Notes ↑ (Top)
C731	Notley Gorge Road; Notley Hills Road; Loop Road	Bridgenorth	Notley Hills	Glengarry	10.3 km (6.4 mi)	
C732	Westwood Road; Bridgenorth Road	Hagley	Bridgenorth	Legana	31.8 km (19.8 mi)	
C733	Rosevears Drive	Legana	Rosevears	Lanena	8.3 km (5.2 mi)	
C734	Ecclestone Road	Riverside		~~Hagley~~; Rosevale	13.7 km (8.5 mi)	Ecclestone Road ends at Rosevale, a long way from Hagley.
C735	Selbourne Road	Hagley		Selbourne	13.4 km (8.3 mi)	
C738	Westwood Road	Carrick		~~Bridgenorth~~; Westwood	6.9 km (4.3 mi)	Westwood Road ends in Westwood, a long way from Bridgenorth.
C739	Windermere Road	Dilston	Windermere	~~Mt Direction~~; Dilston	12.9 km (8.0 mi)	Windermere Road starts and ends in Dilston, and does not enter Mt Direction.
C740	Bakers Beach Road	Harford		Bakers Beach	13.8 km (8.6 mi)	
C741	Bowen Road; Browns Creek Road	York Town		Bakers Beach	18.2 km (11.3 mi)	
C742	John Lees Drive	East Tamar Highway, Dilston		East Tamar Highway, Dilston	7.4 km (4.6 mi)	

==== C801 to C830 ====
Route	Component roads	From	Via	To	Length	Notes ↑ (Top)
C801	Fairhaven Road; Melrose Road; Lucks Road	Emita		Memana	15.1 km (9.4 mi)	On Flinders Island
C803	Memana Road; Lackrana Road	Whitemark	Memana	~~Lady Barron~~; Lackrana	41.0 km (25.5 mi)	On Flinders Island. Lackrana Road ends in Lackrana, some distance from Lady Barron.
C804	Summer Camp Road; Furneaux Lookout Road	Memana Road, Memana	Furneaux Lookout	Lackrana Road, Memana	4.0 km (2.5 mi)	On Flinders Island
C805	Franklin Parade; Coast Road	Lady Barron	Samphire River	Ranga	13.9 km (8.6 mi)	On Flinders Island
C806	Trousers Point Road; Big River Road	Ranga		Strzelecki National Park	15.8 km (9.8 mi)	On Flinders Island
C807	Big Hill Road; Shaw Street; Hope Street; Beechford Road; Davis Street; Proctor Street	Lefroy		Beechford	12.1 km (7.5 mi)	
C808	Shaw Street; Lefroy Road	Lefroy		Pipers River	3.8 km (2.4 mi)	
C809	Dalrymple Road	Mount Direction		~~Lefroy~~; George Town	16.9 km (10.5 mi)	Dalrymple Road ends in George Town, some distance from Lefroy.
C810	East Arm Road	~~Long Reach~~; Hillwood		~~The Glen~~; Mount Direction	4.9 km (3.0 mi)	East Arm Road starts in Hillwood, outside the Long Reach boundary. It ends in Mount Direction, while The Glen (an unbounded locality) is far away in Pipers River.
C811	Bangor Road; Second River Road	Lower Turners Marsh	Bangor	Lilydale	10.6 km (6.6 mi)	
C812	Old Bangor Tram Road	Mount Direction		Lower Turners Marsh	9.5 km (5.9 mi)	
C813	The Glen Road	~~Lower Turners Marsh~~; Pipers River	The Glen	Mount Direction	9.6 km (6.0 mi)	The Glen Road starts in Pipers River, just over the Lower Turners Marsh boundary.
C814	Industry Road	Mount Direction		Pipers River	9.4 km (5.8 mi)	
C815	Troopers Track	Bridport Road, Pipers River		Industry Road, Pipers River	1.9 km (1.2 mi)	Troopers Track link
C816	Weymouth Road; Major Street	Pipers River		Weymouth	14.0 km (8.7 mi)	
C817	Tam O Shanter Road; Hurst Street	Weymouth Road, Weymouth		Lulworth	4.2 km (2.6 mi)	
C818	Pipers Brook Road	Lebrina		Pipers Brook	13.4 km (8.3 mi)	
C819	Retreat Road; Yondover Road; Hextalls Road	Pipers River		Lebrina	16.1 km (10.0 mi)	
C820	Paling Track; Bacala Road; Tunnel Road	Bangor		Tunnel	11.2 km (7.0 mi)	
C821	Bacala Road	~~Bacala~~; Lilydale		Tunnel	2.3 km (1.4 mi)	Bacala Road starts in the locality of Lilydale. Bacala is not in the Placename reference.
C822	Lalla Road	Karoola		Lilydale	5.4 km (3.4 mi)	
C823	Karoola Road; Brown Mountain Road; Underwood Road	Karoola		Underwood	10.2 km (6.3 mi)	
C824	Prossers Road	Underwood		Nunamara	12.6 km (7.8 mi)	
C826	Ferny Hill Road	Golconda		Bridport	13.9 km (8.6 mi)	
C827	Bridport Back Road	Bridport		Nabowla	15.7 km (9.8 mi)	
C828	Targa Hill Road	Targa		Myrtle Bank	3.7 km (2.3 mi)	
C829	Pecks Hill Road	~~St Patricks River~~; Nunamara		Patersonia	2.9 km (1.8 mi)	Pecks Hill Road starts in Nunamara, just over the St Patricks River boundary.
C830	Sledge Track	Scottsdale	West Scottsdale	~~Weelaty~~; Springfield	9.2 km (5.7 mi)	Weelaty is an unbounded locality in the locality of Springfield. The Sledge Track ends in Springfield, well outside Weelaty.

==== C831 to C899 ====
Route	Component roads	From	Via	To	Length	Notes ↑ (Top)
C831	Burnside Road; North Scottsdale Road; Jensens Road	~~Jetsonville~~; Scottsdale	North Scottsdale	~~Tulendeena~~; Tonganah	17.4 km (10.8 mi)	Burnside Road starts in Scottsdale, just over the Jetsonville boundary, and Jensens Road ends in Tonganah, just over the Tulendeena boundary.
C832	Cameron Street; North Scottsdale Road; Old Waterhouse Road	Scottsdale		Waterhouse	32.6 km (20.3 mi)	
C834	Forester Road; Marsh Road	Warrentinna		North Scottsdale	14.5 km (9.0 mi)	
C835	Stoke Street; Warrentinna Road; Main Street	Branxholm		Winnaleah	17.5 km (10.9 mi)	
C836	Tomahawk Road; Tomahawk Drive	~~Waterhouse~~; Tomahawk		Tomahawk	7.2 km (4.5 mi)	Tomahawk Road starts in Tomahawk, just over the Waterhouse boundary. Route C836 ends at Morgan Esplanade.
C839	Racecourse Road; Banca Link	Pioneer		~~Banca~~; Winnaleah	9.9 km (6.2 mi)	Banca Link ends in Winnaleah, just over the Banca boundary.
C840	Winnaleah Road; Banca Road	Winnaleah		~~Waterhouse~~ Tomahawk	23.7 km (14.7 mi)	Banca Road ends in Tomahawk, some distance from Waterhouse.
C841	Tebrakunna Road; Counsels Road; Terrys Hill Road; Lottah Road	Pioneer		Goshen	36.1 km (22.4 mi)	
C843	Carr Street; Cape Portland Road; North Ansons Road; Ansons Bay Road	Gladstone	Ansons Bay	St Helens	64.5 km (40.1 mi)	
C844	Cape Portland Road; Little Musselroe Road	Gladstone		Lyme Regis	25.9 km (16.1 mi)	Lyme Regis is an unbounded locality within the locality of Cape Portland
C845	Musselroe Road; Main Road	Gladstone		Musselroe Bay	16.5 km (10.3 mi)	Ends at Russell Road.
C846	Eddystone Road	Ansons Bay		Eddystone Point	11.5 km (7.1 mi)	Eddystone Point is a promontory in the locality of Eddystone.
C848	Gardens Road	Binalong Bay		The Gardens	13.2 km (8.2 mi)	
C849	Reids Road	Priory		Binalong Bay	8.5 km (5.3 mi)	Priory is an unbounded locality within the locality of St Helens.
C850	Quail Street; Binalong Bay Road; Main Road	St Helens		Binalong Bay	10.7 km (6.6 mi)	Ends at Gulch Road.
C851	St Helens Point Road	Parkside		St Helens Point	11.2 km (7.0 mi)	Parkside is an unbounded locality within the locality of St Helens. St Helens Point is a promontory in the locality of Akaroa.
C852	Bellingham Road	Pipers Brook		Bellingham	5.6 km (3.5 mi)	
C853	Bell Bay Road	East Tamar Highway, Bell Bay		Bell Bay	2.1 km (1.3 mi)	Ends at Bell Bay wharf entrance.
C854	Patersonia Road	Nunamara		~~Myrtle Bank~~; Patersonia	13.4 km (8.3 mi)	The northern end of C854 (at Targa Hill Road) is in Patersonia, just over the Myrtle Bank boundary. Google maps shows C854 extending further north than the references. This has been ignored.

=== Touring routes ===
Official tasmanian touring routes.

Route	Component roads	From	Via	To	Length	Notes ↑ (Top)
Western Wilds	A5; A10; B23; B24; B27; B61; C249	New Norfolk	Maydena; Strathgordon; Westerway; Hamilton; Bothwell; Miena; Liawenee; Ouse; Tarraleah; Derwent Bridge; Queenstown; Strahan; Zeehan; Corinna; Waratah; Rosebery	Waratah		Has loops and side trails
Cradle Country Touring Route	B18; C132	Devonport	Latrobe; Sheffield; Cradle Valley; Waratah	Devonport		
The Heritage Highway	ZZZ	Granton	Pontville; Kempton; Oatlands; Ross; Campbell Town; Longford; Evandale	Perth		Loop through last three towns
Great Nature Trail	1; A2	Bakers Beach	Port Sorell; Ulverstone; Burnie; Wynyard; Boat Harbour; Sisters Beach; Rocky Cape; Stanley; Smithton	Arthur River		
Great Eastern Drive	A3; A4	Buckland	Orford; Spring Beach; Triabunna; Swansea; Bicheno; Coles Bay; St Marys; Fingal; St Helens; Binalong Bay; Pyengana	Weldborough		Loop and side trails
Great Western Tiers Tourist Route	1; B12	Prospect	Hadspen; Westbury; Deloraine; Mole Creek	Liena		
North East Trail	A3; B84	Rocherlea	Lilydale; Scottsdale; Bridport; Derby	Weldborough		Side trail
Convict Trail	A3; A9; B31; C351	Hobart	Richmond; Sorell; Copping; Dunalley; Eaglehawk Neck; Port Arthur	Port Arthur		
Southern Trove	A6; B66; B68; C629; C630; C631; C632; C635; C636	Hobart	Kettering; Adventure Bay; Cape Bruny Lighthouse; Geeveston; Dover; Southport; Hastings Caves; Tahune Airwalk; Huonville; Kingston	Hobart		Loops and side trails
Tamar Valley Touring Route	A7; A8	Launceston	Exeter; Beaconsfield; Beauty Point; Greens Beach; George Town; Low Head; Rocherlea	Launceston		

Source: State of Tasmania (2020). Visitors Map Tasmania (Map). 1:500000. Cartography by Geocentric Datum of Australia 1994 (GDA94). Tasmania, Australia: Tasmanian Government. EAN 9318923008524.

== See also ==
- List of highways in Tasmania
