= Brooks High School (Launceston, Tasmania) =

School in Tasmania, Australia

Location
- 215 George Town Road; Rocherlea, Launceston, Tasmania; Australia; 41°22′42″S 147°7′14″E

Information
- Type: Government comprehensive junior secondary school
- Established: 1948; 78 years ago
- Status: Open
- School district: Northern
- Educational authority: Department for Education, Children and Young People
- Oversight: Office of Tasmanian Assessment, Standards & Certification
- Principal: Louise Fisher
- Teaching staff: 33.3 FTE (2019)
- Years: Year 7–10
- Gender: Co-educational
- Enrolment: 436 (2019)
- Campus type: Regional
- Website: brookshigh.education.tas.edu.au

Brooks High School is a government co-educational comprehensive junior secondary school located in Rocherlea, a northern suburb of Launceston, Tasmania, Australia. Established in 1948, the school caters for approximately 500 students from Years 7 to 10. The school is administered by the Department for Education, Children and Young People.

In 2019 student enrolments were 436. The school principal is Louise Fisher.

The school services the Launceston northern suburbs of Invermay, Mayfield, Mowbray, Newnham, Ravenswood and Rocherlea.

== History ==
Brooks High School opened in 1948. The school originally centred on a large blue gum tree, where it held assemblies. In 1990, the University of Tasmania incorporated these grounds and the school moved to its present site in Rocherlea. The present site resembles the original grounds; both feature large open spaces and separate buildings.

In 1995, the school established the No Dole Program. The program's success led other Australian high schools to found similar programs. Speakers at the Program have included former prime minister John Howard, former education minister Brendan Nelson, former Labor Party Leader Kim Beazley, Hawthorn footballer Dermott Brereton, late motor racing driver Peter Brock, and former Australian cricket captain Ricky Ponting. Ponting also attended the school.

== Notable alumni ==
- Daniel Geale – boxer
- Ricky Ponting – cricketer
- Charles Wooley – journalist

== See also ==
- List of schools in Tasmania
- Education in Tasmania
