= Tayene, Tasmania =

Tayene
- Town
- Coordinates: 41°21′02″S 147°27′08″E
- Country: Australia
- State: Tasmania
- Region: North-east, Launceston
- LGA: Break O'Day, Dorset, City of Launceston
- Location: 31 km (19 mi) S of Scottsdale

Government
  - State electorate: Lyons, Bass
  - Federal division: Lyons, Bass

Population
  - Total: 9 (2016 census)
- Postcode: 7259
Localities around Tayene
Springfield	South Springfield	Ringarooma
Targa, Nunamara	Tayene	Upper Esk, Trenah
Blessington	Burns Creek, Upper Blessington	Upper Esk

Tayene is a rural locality in the local government areas (LGA) of Break O'Day, Dorset and Launceston in the North-east and Launceston LGA regions of Tasmania. The locality is about 31 kilometres (19 mi) south of the town of Scottsdale. The 2016 census recorded a population of 9 for the state suburb of Tayene.

== History ==
Tayene was gazetted as a locality in 1963.

== Geography ==
Several streams flow from the southern part of the locality to the North Esk River, which forms a small part of the southern boundary.

== Road infrastructure ==
Route C405 (Camden Road / Camden Hill Road) passes through from south to north-west.
