= Dilston =

Dilston may refer to:

- Dilston, Northumberland, a village and former civil parish in Northumberland, England close to Corbridge, the location of Dilston Castle
- Dilston, Tasmania, a suburb of Launceston in Australia
