= Turners Marsh, Tasmania =

Turners Marsh Tasmania
- Coordinates: 41°18′19″S 147°07′18″E
- Population: 254 (2016 census)
- Postcode(s): 7267
- Location: 19 km (12 mi) N of Launceston
- LGA(s): Launceston
- Region: Launceston
- State electorate(s): Bass
- Federal division(s): Bass
Localities around Turners Marsh:
Mount Direction	Karoola, Mount Direction	Karoola
Dilston	Turners Marsh	Underwood
Rocherlea	Rocherlea	Underwood

Turners Marsh is a rural locality in the local government area (LGA) of Launceston in the Launceston LGA region of Tasmania. The locality is about 19 kilometres (12 mi) north of the town of Launceston. The 2016 census recorded a population of 254 for the state suburb of Turners Marsh.

== History ==
Turners Marsh was gazetted as a locality in 1963. The original European name for this area was “Mountgarrets Lagoon”.

== Geography ==
The boundaries consist primarily of survey lines. The Bell Bay Railway Line follows the south-western boundary.

== Infrastructure ==
Route B83 (Pipers River Road) passes through from south to north. The abandoned alignment of the North East Railway Line passes through Turners Marsh. The local tourist and heritage rail group Launceston and North East Railway has set up their main base of operations at the Karoola Fire Station in Turners Marsh. They plan to operate railbug and passenger rail services along the rail corridor from their Turners Marsh base.
