= Mount Barrow =

Mountain in Tasmania, Australia

Mount Barrow (pialermeliggener)
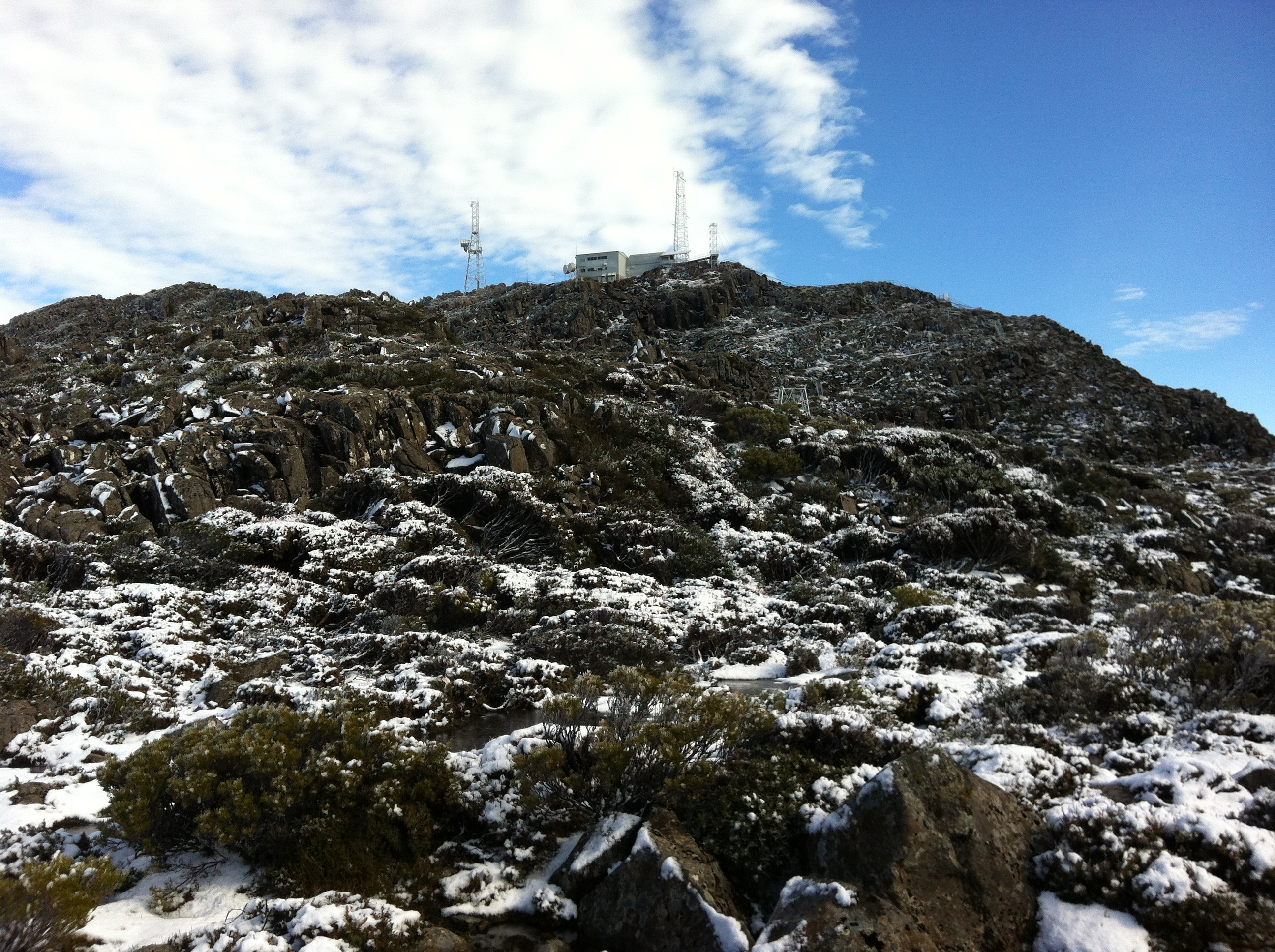
- View of summit ridge at Mount Barrow

Highest point
- Elevation: 1,406 m (4,613 ft)
- Prominence: 796 m (2,612 ft)
- Isolation: 21.43 km (13.32 mi)
- Coordinates: 41°22′12″S 147°24′36″E

Geography
- Location within Tasmania
- Location: Northern Tasmania, Australia

Geology
- Rock age(s): Jurassic, Ice age
- Mountain type(s): Dolerite, granite

Mount Barrow (Aboriginal: pialermeliggener) is a mountain in the northern region of Tasmania, Australia. With an elevation of 1,406 metres (4,613 ft) above sea level, the mountain is located 22 kilometres (14 mi) east-north-east of Launceston. The mountain habitat is a mixture of temperate old growth rainforest, subalpine and alpine landscapes.

== Location and features ==
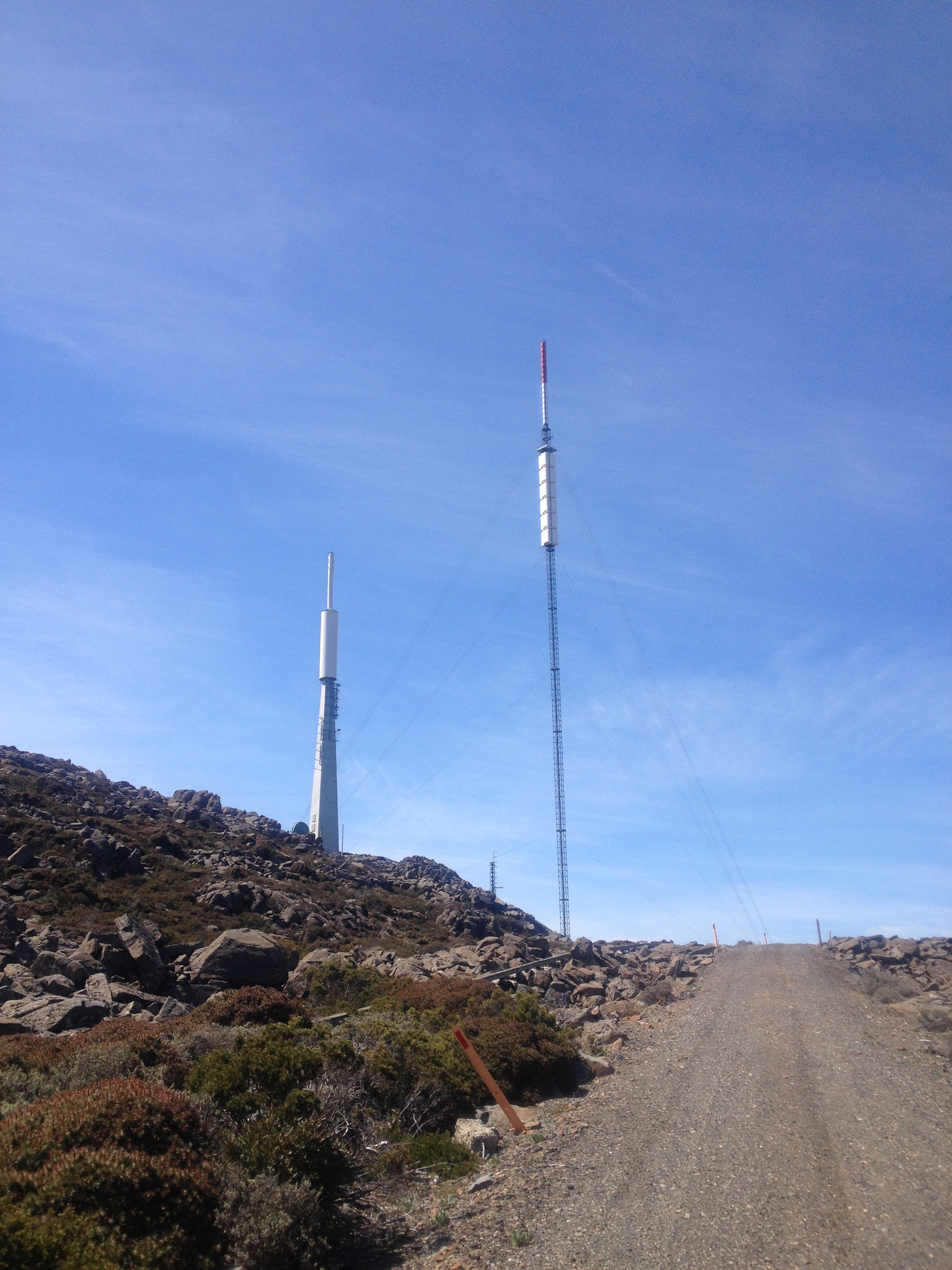
TV transmission towers on Mount Barrow

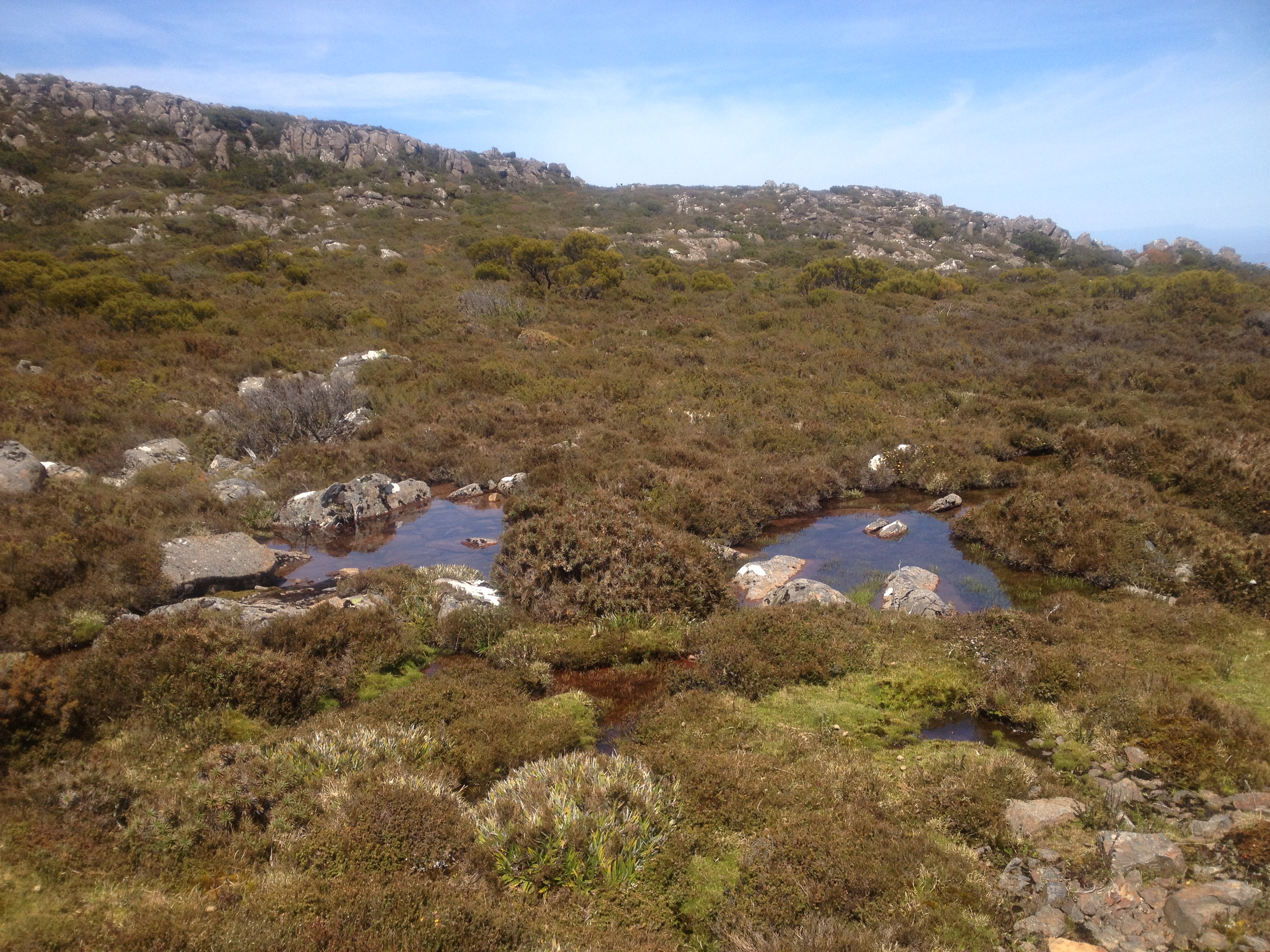
Tarns on the alpine plateau at Mount Barrow

Mount Barrow is a Jurassic dolerite-capped plateau with widespread block fields and a sharp summit ridge at the north-eastern end. It is the closest alpine mountain to Launceston - the plateau extends to 3 kilometres (2 mi) and reaches a maximum altitude of 1,406 metres (4,613 ft) above sea level, making it the second highest peak in eastern Tasmania. The road to the summit is periodically closed in winter due to snow; near the summit this becomes a narrow gravel road leading to a parking area, with an old stone hut nearby. The snow line is located at around 1,100 metres (3,609 ft).

The mountain is in lands once occupied by Aboriginal Tasmanians and lies at the border of country occupied by the Ben Lomond Nation, to the south; the Letteremairener Clan, in the Tamar Valley and the Pyemmairrenerpairrener clan, to the north-east.

=== Nomenclature ===
It is probable that the indigenous name for the mountain was pialermeliggener, transcribed by G.A. Robinson when he was searching the upper Pipers River area. pialermeliggener is sometimes used to describe nearby Mt Arthur, but examination of Robinson's travels and the translation of the aboriginal word (with the suffix meaning cliffs or scree near summit) accord with the exposed cliffs on most faces of Mt Barrow.

The feature is shown as Row Tor on some maps of the area in the early 1800s although, confusingly, this is most often used as the early toponym for nearby Mt Arthur.

The modern name is believed to have been for Sir John Barrow, a British Admiralty official. It is probable that Lieutenant-Governor Franklin named the mountain in Sir John Barrow's honour; as the two were likely acquainted and the mountain first appears as such on maps during Franklin's Governorship. Confusing the issue further, Mt Barrow is named 'Ben Loder' in John Glover's 1836 painting and the mountain is further mentioned in newspaper print several times as 'Mount Barron' - and may have been known colloquially as such in the 19th century.

==== Cartography of the Mount Barrow region ====
Versions of Flinders' 1798 map, adapted in 1825, clearly show the Mt Barrow region depicted as Row Tor; however, maps of 1843 onwards clearly shows Mount Barrow marked in its present location and adds 'Row Tor' as the foothills slightly west towards Launceston. Later maps of the north-east show Row Tor as occupying the present day location of Mt Arthur, it's possible that originally Row Tor was the colloquial name for the broader north-east highlands region and the separate massifs of present-day Mount Arthur and Mount Barrow were delineated cartographically in the 1840s.

Geology of Mount Barrow

Mount Barrow is mostly dolomite from the Jurassic period, which has been predicted to have come to the surface around the late Cretaceous, with more recent granite developed in the Ice age. When the Ice age ended, rain would have washed away the stagnant dirt and uncovered the variety of rocks that can now be seen at the summit.

=== History of the Mount Barrow area ===
The mountain formed an imposing barrier to settlers for long into the 19th century and the steep and rainforested country behind the mountain was visited infrequently. In the 1830s the country was explored by George Robinson and the botanist Robert William Lawrence, who both commented on the steep and difficult country. The hinterland was subject to scientific exploration by Paul Strzelecki in 1846 and prospectors gradually opened up the rugged country in the north-east after that time.

By the late 1870s settlement had made inroads into the surrounding valleys and the forests began to be exploited for their wood, as well as clearing country for emerging settlements such as Nunamara, Patersonia and Diddleum Plains.

A state reserve on Mount Barrow occupies 459 hectares (1,134 acres) and is an important habitat for several threatened species. These include the Tasmanian Wedge-tailed Eagle, the spotted-tail quoll and Eastern quoll and the Mount Arthur Burrowing Crayfish. Marsupials regularly sighted on the mountain include wombats, pademelons, Bennett's wallabies and Forester kangaroos. The reserve also features a pleasant picnic ground with a nature trail beginning and ending there.

Numerous mountain streams are found across the escarpment and these can turn into substantial waterfalls after heavy snowfall.

Mount Barrow is the main television and FM radio transmission site for north east Tasmania. The broadcasting and telecommunication structures are subject to ice build up and have shields incorporated into their designs to prevent damage from falling ice. Due to the rugged terrain the programme reaches the sites via microwave links instead of the usual fibre optic cables. Electrical power reaches the facilities by an overhead line running up the eastern side of the mountain.

== See also ==
- List of mountains in Australia § Tasmania
