= Riverside Potters =

Tasmania ceramic artists group (1969–1989)

The Riverside Potters was a group of ceramic artists in Launceston, Tasmania operating between 1969 and 1989. Members created, exhibited, and taught pottery.

== Foundation ==
Riverside Potters was founded in 1969 by artists Pat Cleveland, OAM (1933–), Peg Pedley (1925–) and Betsy Thain (1926–2021). The group operated from a studio overlooking the Riverside Golf Course. Soon after, Betty Curtis, Elizabeth Godfrey Smith and Jill Kirkham worked with the group.

== Activities ==
The Riverside Potters crafted vessels from clays dug locally that were finished with glazes made from materials collected around Tasmania. Clay was sourced from localities such as Relbia, near Launceston, and the East Coast of Tasmania. Granite from Coles Bay and rutile from King Island were some of the materials used in glazes.

Alongside workspace, the studio included electric and gas kilns, drying and glazing rooms and storage shelves. There were pottery wheels, although some members preferred hand-assembly.

Pedley, Cleveland and Thain taught earthenware pottery classes at Riverside Potters for students of Adult Education. Visiting tutors from interstate and overseas conducted workshops for members. Tutors included Shigeo Shiga (1928–2011), Peter Rushforth (1920–2015), Colin Levy (1933–), and Hiroe Swen (1934–).

In 2010 Pat Cleveland was awarded Medal of the Order of Australia (OAM) for service to the arts in Tasmania through industry development and roles supporting emerging artists.

== Exhibitions ==
- Group exhibition, 15 Brisbane Street, Launceston 5–8 December 1975.
- Patches of Light, Queen Victoria Museum and Art Gallery, Launceston.

== Collections ==
Pedley, Peg, Queen Victoria Museum and Art Gallery (QVMAG) Launceston, 21 July 2019.
