= Lalla, Tasmania =

Lalla Tasmania
- Coordinates: 41°15′11″S 147°10′53″E
- Population: 87 (2016 census)
- Postcode(s): 7267
- Location: 30 km (19 mi) N of Launceston
- LGA(s): Launceston
- Region: Launceston
- State electorate(s): Bass
- Federal division(s): Bass
Localities around Lalla:
Karoola	Karoola, Lilydale	Lilydale
Karoola	Lalla	Lilydale
Karoola	Karoola	Underwood

Lalla is a rural locality in the local government area (LGA) of Launceston in the Launceston LGA region of Tasmania. The locality is about 30 kilometres (19 mi) north of the town of Launceston. The 2016 census recorded a population of 87 for the state suburb of Lalla.

== History ==
Lalla was gazetted as a locality in 1963. The name is believed to be an Aboriginal word for “ant”.

== Geography ==
The boundaries consist of survey lines.

== Road infrastructure ==
Route C822 (Lalla Road) passes through from west to east.
