= Nunamara =

Nunamara Tasmania
- Coordinates: 41°22′10″S 147°18′14″E
- Population: 305 (2021 census)
- Postcode(s): 7259
- Location: 23 km (14 mi) NE of Launceston
- LGA(s): Launceston
- Region: Launceston
- State electorate(s): Bass
- Federal division(s): Bass
Localities around Nunamara:
Underwood	Patersonia	Targa
Waverley, Ravenswood, Rocherlea	Nunamara	Tayene
St Leonards	White Hills	Burns Creek, Blessington

Nunamara is a rural locality in the local government area (LGA) of Launceston in the Launceston LGA Region of Tasmania. The locality is about 14 kilometres (8.7 mi) north-east of the town of Launceston. Nestled along the St Patricks River, a tributary of the North Esk River, it serves as a key site for streamflow monitoring. With a population of 305 as of the 2021 Australian census, Nunamara is characterized by an older demographic, with a median age of 45 years. The area is primarily residential, with most homes being standalone dwellings. Notably, Nunamara is the childhood home of Peter Gutwein, the former Premier of Tasmania. The locality is accessible via several major roads, including the Tasman Highway (Route A3), which runs through the area.

== Geography and location ==
Nunamara is about 14 kilometres (8.7 mi) north-east of the town of Launceston. The St Patricks River, a tributary of the North Esk River runs through Nunamara, which is used as a point for monitoring streamflow by the Department of Primary Industries, Parks, Water and Environment.

== Demographics ==
Nunamara is a small locality with a population of 305 residents as of the 2021 Australian census. The median age is 45 years, which is slightly higher than the national median of 38 and the Tasmanian median of 42, indicating a somewhat older population compared to the broader averages.

The gender distribution is relatively balanced, with approximately 52.8% male and 47.2% female residents. Indigenous Australians comprise about 4.3% of the local population, which is slightly below the Tasmanian percentage of 5.4% but above the national figure of 3.2%.

In terms of household composition, the average household size is 2.6 people, with families having an average of 1.7 children. The median weekly household income in Nunamara is $1,680, higher than the Tasmanian median of $1,358 but slightly below the Australian median of $1,746.

Housing in Nunamara is predominantly composed of separate houses, with 98.2% of dwellings being standalone homes, compared to 87.7% in Tasmania and 72.3% across Australia.

== Notable residents ==
Peter Gutwein, a prominent Tasmanian politician, was raised in Nunamara. He served as Premier of Tasmania from 2020 to 2022, and held several key roles including Treasurer, Minister for Tourism, and Minister for Climate Change. A proud Tasmanian, Gutwein was first elected to the Tasmanian Parliament in 2002, representing the seat of Bass. He maintains strong connections to North East Tasmania.

== Road infrastructure ==
Route A3 (Tasman Highway) passes through from west to north. Route C854 (Patersonia Road) starts at an intersection with A3 and runs north until it exits. Route C824 (Prossers Road) starts at an intersection with C854 and runs north-west until it exits. Route C829 (Pecks Hill Road) starts at an intersection with A3 and runs north-west until it exits. Route C404 (Mount Barrow Road) starts at an intersection with A3 and runs south-east to Mount Barrow, where it ends.
