= Burns Creek, Tasmania =

Burns Creek Tasmania
- Coordinates: 41°27′26″S 147°29′15″E
- Population: 35 (2016 census)
- Postcode(s): 7212
- Location: 44 km (27 mi) E of Launceston
- LGA(s): Launceston
- Region: Launceston
- State electorate(s): Bass
- Federal division(s): Bass
Localities around Burns Creek:
Nunamara	Tayene	Tayene
Blessington	Burns Creek	Upper Blessington
Blessington	Blessington	Upper Blessington

Burns Creek is a rural locality in the local government area (LGA) of Launceston in the Launceston LGA region of Tasmania. The locality is about 43 kilometres (27 mi) east of the town of Launceston. The 2016 census recorded a population of 35 for the state suburb of Burns Creek.

== History ==
Burns Creek was gazetted as a locality in 1963.

== Geography ==
The North Esk River forms most of the southern boundary.

== Road infrastructure ==
Route C415 (Burns Creek Road) passes through from west to south.
