= Invermay, Tasmania =

Suburb in the northern part of Launceston, Tasmania

Invermay
- Suburb
- Interactive map of Invermay
- Coordinates: 41°25′S 147°08′E
- Country: Australia
- State: Tasmania
- Region: Launceston
- City: Launceston
- LGA: City of Launceston
- Location: 3 km (1.9 mi) N of Launceston
- Established: 1880s

Government
  - State electorate: Bass
  - Federal division: Bass

Area
  - Total: 4.1 km^{2} (1.6 sq mi)

Population
  - Total: 3,498 (SAL 2021)
- Postcode: 7248
Suburbs around Invermay
Tamar River	Mowbray	Mowbray
Tamar River	Invermay	Ravenswood
Tamar River	Launceston	Launceston

Invermay is a residential locality in the local government area (LGA) of Launceston in the Launceston LGA region of Tasmania. The locality is about 3 kilometres (1.9 mi) north of the town of Launceston. The 2021 census recorded a population of 3,498 for the state suburb of Invermay. It is a suburb of Launceston, which contains the minor suburb of Inveresk, it is located on the eastern side of the Tamar River and the northern side of the North Esk River, the suburb is most notable as being home to York Park (University of Tasmania Stadium).

Invermay is also home to many of Launceston's cultural institutions, in an area known as the "Inveresk Precinct" including the Tramway museum, Queen Victoria Museum and Art Gallery, The Powerhouse Gallery and ArtSpace and University of Tasmania campus. Invermay is home to Riverbend Park which was voted Tasmania’s Favourite Playground in 2021.

== History ==
Invermay was gazetted as a locality in 1863. It was proclaimed a Town in 1896 and included in Greater Launceston in 1907.

== Geography ==
The waters of the Tamar River and the North Esk River form the north-western to south-eastern boundaries.

== Road infrastructure ==
Route A8 (East Tamar Highway) runs through from south to north semi bypassing Invermay, while Invermay Road goes through most of the suburb centre of Invermay.
