= Newnham, Tasmania =

Suburb of Launceston, Tasmania

Newnham
- Suburb
- Interactive map of Newnham
- Coordinates: 41°23′15″S 147°07′01″E
- Country: Australia
- State: Tasmania
- Region: Launceston
- City: Launceston
- LGA: City of Launceston
- Location: 7 km (4.3 mi) N of Launceston

Government
  - State electorate: Bass
  - Federal division: Bass

Population
  - Total: 6,453 (2016 census)
- Postcode: 7248
Suburbs around Newnham
Dilston	Rocherlea	Rocherlea
Tamar River	Newnham	Mayfield
Tamar River	Tamar River	Mowbray

Newnham is a residential locality in the local government area (LGA) of Launceston in the Launceston LGA region of Tasmania. The locality is about 7 kilometres (4.3 mi) north of the town of Launceston. The 2016 census recorded a population of 6453 for the state suburb of Newnham. It is a suburb of Launceston. Newnham is located on the East Tamar Highway, on the eastern side of the Tamar River.

The University of Tasmania, Australian Maritime College and TasTAFE have a campus in Newnham. Mowbray Indoor Sport 'n' Skate is also located in this area.

== History ==
Newnham was gazetted as a locality in 1963.

The suburb was nearly named "Mowbray Heights" in 1961, but this was not gazetted.

== Geography ==
The waters of the Tamar River form the south-western boundary.

== Road infrastructure ==
Route A8 (East Tamar Highway) runs through from south to north.
