= Deddington, Tasmania =

Deddington
- Town
- Coordinates: 41°37′S 147°25′E
- Country: Australia
- State: Tasmania
- Region: Central
- LGA: Northern Midlands
- Location: 183 km (114 mi) N of Hobart; 37 km (23 mi) SE of Launceston; 17 km (11 mi) SE of Evandale; 34 km (21 mi) E of Longford

Government
  - State electorate: Lyons
  - Federal division: Lyons
- Elevation: 245 m (804 ft)

Population
  - Total: 121 (2016 census)
- Postcode: 7212
Localities around Deddington
| Evandale | Blessington, Upper Blessington | Upper Blessington |
| Nile | Deddington | Ben Lomond |
| Nile | Conara | Rossarden |

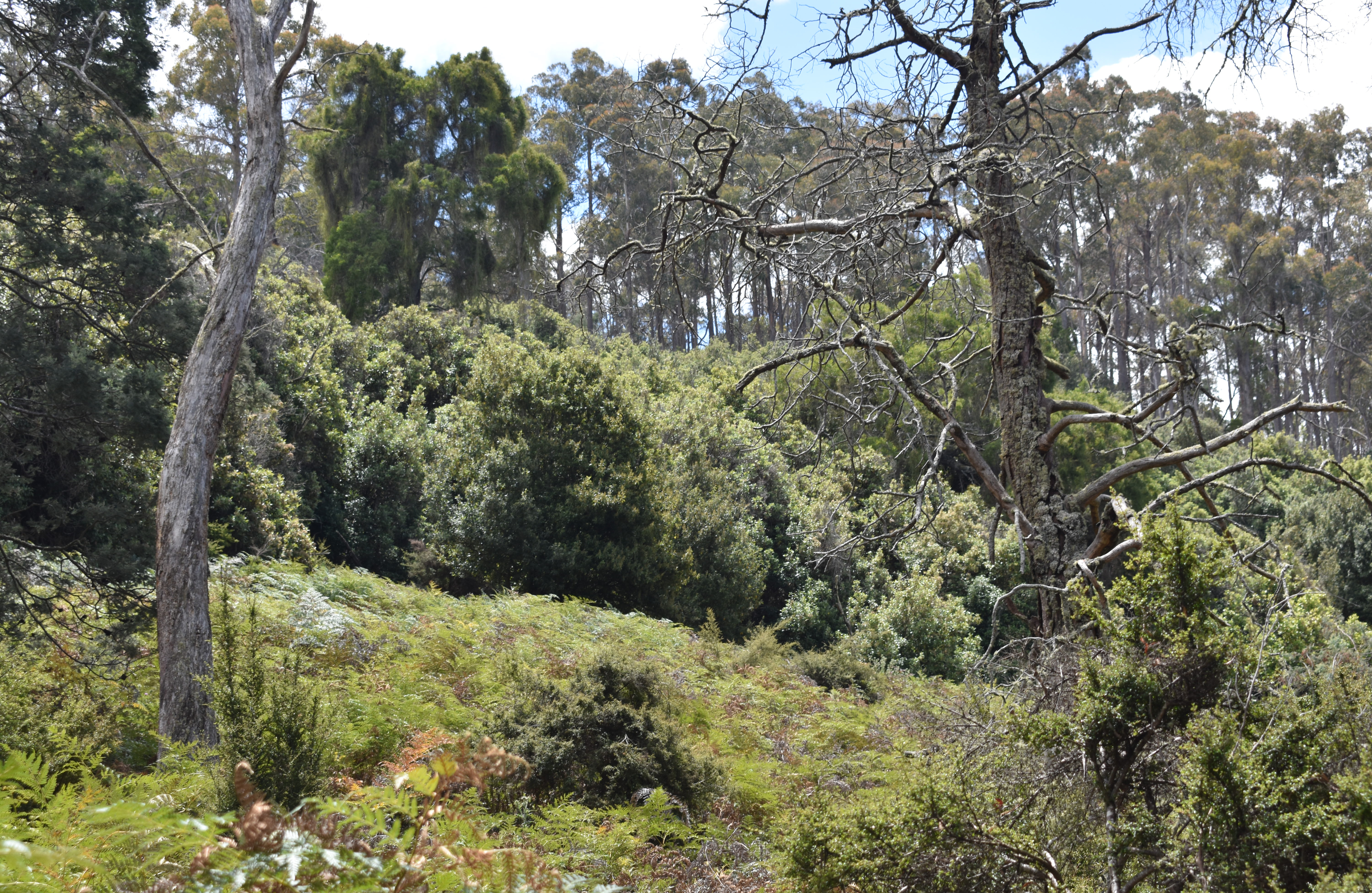
A stand of dry rainforest located on a property in Deddington, Tasmania

Deddington is a rural locality in the local government area (LGA) of Northern Midlands in the Central LGA region of Tasmania. The locality is about 34 kilometres (21 mi) east of the town of Longford. The 2016 census recorded a population of 121 for the state suburb of Deddington. The town is situated on the Nile River and lies in the foothills of Ben Lomond.

== History ==
The first inhabitants of the Deddington area were Tasmanian Aboriginal people of the Ben Lomond nation. Aboriginal artifacts indicating land use (hunting) and seasonal camps have been found along the Nile River and Patterdale Creek. It is uncertain which clans had specific use of the area but the Plindermairhemener clan is referred to as occupying the western South Esk region. The palawa kani (Tasmanian Aboriginal language) name for the Nile River at Deddington was witakina. It is likely that the Deddington area was a hunting ground as well as part of the seasonal migratory route for both the Ben Lomond nation clans, referred to generally as the Plangermaireener, and also clans from the North Midlands nation, who visited the Ben Lomond plateau in summer.

Settlers were granted land around the site of the current town in the second and third decades of the 1800s. James Cox was granted land at Nile, Anthony Cottrell to the north at Gordons Plains, and Massey was granted land to the south at Mills Plains, now the Deddington district. It is likely that stock keepers, kangaroo hunters and timber-cutters (convicts assigned to colonial landowners) moved in advance of settlers to the fringes of the Ben Lomond escarpment and up the South Esk Valley. As was common at the frontier, stock keepers both negotiated and came into conflict with the Aboriginal clans in the Deddington area.

Aboriginal people often traded at the frontier with assigned men, the currency being food, sexual favours and hunting dogs. However relations would often sour, sometimes with fatal consequences, and the first recorded killing of convict stockmen at Deddington occurred in 1825, when Arnold and Booth (assigned men working for Barclay and Cox) were killed and mutilated at their stock hut in a dispute over ownership of hunting dogs and abuse of women. Unusually, a Plangermaireener witness, Temina, gave evidence under translation at trial in Launceston and he stated that the two men were speared to death and further mutilated by women of his people who "crushed his head with a stone".

In subsequent years, there are several records of disputes at the frontier - with killing of cattle and retributive violence on both sides. Finally, escalating pressures on the Plangermaireener from encroaching settlement on hunting grounds, increasing violence, permitted by lax colonial policies towards Indigenous rights to land, and removal of women and children for sexual or domestic enslavement led to the desperate violence of the Black War.

During the Black War, the remaining Aboriginal clansmen of the Plangermaireener prosecuted a desperate campaign of harassment and theft along the South Esk and Nile valleys. John Batman and Anthony Cottrell were both involved in roving parties, essentially bounty hunters contracted to remove Aboriginal people from contested areas by force. It was reported in August 1829 that violence had escalated around the Deddington area, culminating in the fatal spearing of an assigned of the settler, Lord. At his time Batman received his commission to establish his roving party, consisting of several NSW Aboriginal people procured for this purpose and supported by a convict party and the Tasmanian Aboriginal "Black Bill" Ponsonby.

John Batman made numerous forays from his home at Kingston, near Deddington, following the Plangermaireener up the South Esk Valley to the south and east of Ben Lomond. John Batman describes in his letters of July 1830 how he had dispatched women of the Ben Lomond nation along tracks around their "usual haunts" around Stacks Bluff and to Pigeons Plains -the Nile Valley near Lilyburn Bridge, north of Deddington.

By the 1840s the remnant peoples of the Ben Lomond nation had long been exiled to Flinders Island and there was sufficient settler population in the Deddington area for a chapel to be constructed above the Nile River. Local legend has it that the artist John Glover built the chapel but it is likely that the chapel was erected by the land donor and Reverend Russell from Evandale. John Glover is buried in the cemetery. Services for the emerging town and rural area were instituted from the 1860s when the town area was circumscribed. Deddington Post Office opened on 1 December 1862 and closed in 1970. A school opened in Deddington in early 1865, at the chapel, at the urging of Russell; the first teacher employed at 50 pounds a year. By mid 1866 land had been set aside for police barracks and a constable was permanently stationed in the town. The Deddington Inn was licensed in December of the same year. In 1882 a correspondent to the Launceston Examiner newspaper stated:

Deddington contains one hotel and store combined, a brick building, a smithy, post-oflice, and about a dozen other buildings.

By 1980 the town centre had declined with the post office, school and shop long closed. The Deddington Inn burnt down in 1980 and now the town, and rural area, is serviced by the nearby town of Evandale. Deddington was gazetted as a locality in 1959.

== Geography ==
The Nile River, a tributary of the South Esk River, flows through from east to west.

== Road infrastructure ==
Route C420 (Deddington Road) passes through from north to west.

== Notable residents ==
The artist John Glover was granted land in the area at Patterdale creek.

John Batman lived nearby at Kingston Farm on the Ben Lomond Rivulet.
