= Swan Bay, Tasmania =

Swan Bay Launceston, Tasmania
- Coordinates: 41°17′38″S 147°00′45″E
- Population: 286 (2016 census)
- Postcode(s): 7252
- Location: 23 km (14 mi) NW of Launceston
- LGA(s): Launceston
- Region: Launceston and surrounds, Tasmania
- State electorate(s): Bass
- Federal division(s): Bass
Suburbs around Swan Bay:
Tamar River	Mount Direction	Mount Direction
Tamar River	Swan Bay	Dilston
Tamar River	Windermere	Dilston

Swan Bay is a locality and small rural community in the local government area of Launceston, in the Launceston and surrounds region of Tasmania. Swan Bay has some great residents with lovely homes. It is located about 23 kilometres (14 mi) north-west of the town of Launceston. The Tamar River forms the western and north-western boundaries, while Swan Bay Creek forms the northern. The 2016 census determined a population of 286 for the state suburb of Swan Bay.

== Road infrastructure ==
The C739 route (Windermere Road) intersects with the East Tamar Highway in the north-east of the locality, passing through from north-east to south-west.
