= Mayfield, Tasmania =

Mayfield Launceston, Tasmania
- Coordinates: 41°23′22″S 147°07′51″E
- Population: 1,454 (2016 census)
- Postcode(s): 7248
- Location: 7 km (4 mi) N of Launceston
- LGA(s): City of Launceston
- Region: Launceston
- State electorate(s): Bass
- Federal division(s): Bass
Suburbs around Mayfield:
Newnham	Rocherlea	Rocherlea
Newnham	Mayfield	Rocherlea
Newnham	Mowbray	Mowbray

Mayfield is a residential locality in the local government area (LGA) of Launceston in the Launceston LGA region of Tasmania. The locality is about 7 kilometres (4.3 mi) north of the town of Launceston. The 2016 census recorded a population of 1454 for the state suburb of Mayfield. It is a state suburb in Tasmania. It is located north of Launceston.

7% of Mayfield residents are Indigenous peoples, and 20% are foreign born. Local employment is primarily in service industries, such as restaurants and groceries.

== History ==
Mayfield was gazetted as a locality in 1963. The area was previously a property called “Mayfield Estate”.

== Geography ==
The Bell Bay Railway Line marks the north-eastern boundary.

== Road infrastructure ==
Route B81 (George Town Road) passes to the west. From there, several streets provide access to the locality.
