= Ravenswood, Tasmania =

Ravenswood Launceston, Tasmania
- Coordinates: 41°25′06″S 147°10′34″E
- Population: 3,804 (SAL 2021)
- Postcode(s): 7250
- Location: 3.5 km (2 mi) from Launceston
- LGA(s): City of Launceston
- State electorate(s): Bass
- Federal division(s): Bass
Suburbs around Ravenswood:
Mowbray
Launceston	Ravenswood
Newstead	St Leonards	Waverley

Ravenswood is an eastern suburb of Launceston, Tasmania, Australia.

== History ==
Ravenswood, first settled in the early 19th century, began as a small farming community. The area’s name is believed to derive from a property owned by David McGown on Distillery Creek. McGown acquired 2,030 acres in 1836 and named his property Ravenswood. Over time, the district adopted the name.

McGown, who had a background in distilling in Scotland, operated a distillery on his property. His brother-in-law, James Towers, managed the Caledonian Distillery, which used water piped from nearby springs. The distillery was known for exchanging whiskey for grain brought by local settlers. A flour mill, Harden Mill, was constructed nearby in 1857 by James Scott, McGown’s son-in-law. Over the years, it was operated by different owners, including James Marshall in 1892, during whose tenure it was recorded as Marshall's Mill. The mill was eventually sold to Robert Hogarth and demolished in 1932 due to structural issues.

Other early settlers of the district included families such as the Towse brothers, Faulkner, Gipton, Hodgson, and others. Many early homes were constructed from large stone blocks, and settlers also built community structures such as a small hall in front of the original Gipton house, which is now the Ravenswood Gospel Chapel.

Ravenswood saw early infrastructure development, including bridges over the North Esk River. In 1914, Amelia Dean, owner of Hiawatha Farm, negotiated the construction of a flood-resistant bridge at Henry Street in exchange for 20 acres of land. Earlier, George Hobler privately financed the first Hobler’s Bridge near his property at South Ravenswood. Over time, two additional bridges bearing the same name were built in different locations.

The area also had educational institutions. The first school, built on land donated by Robert Gipton, opened in the 19th century but closed in 1940 due to declining enrollment. A new primary school opened in 1957, coinciding with the area's population growth. By 1972, Ravenswood had expanded significantly, reaching a population of 2,870.

Today, Ravenswood has evolved from a rural settlement to a suburban area with schools, shopping centers, and modern infrastructure.

== Facilities ==
Ravenswood has the following facilities:

- Two shopping centres
- Police station
- Volunteer Fire Station
- Skate park
- Hotel
- Over 50's club
- Community health centre
- Community centre
- Pharmacy
- Library
- Bakery
- Neighbourhood house
- Newsagent
- Church
- IGA Supermarket
- Bowls club
- Op Shop
- Bike Museum
- Mamas CAF

== Education ==
Ravenswood's population expanded rapidly in the 1970s and in 1976 a high school opened under the Principal Peter Brooker. The school population peaked in 1979 - 1984 when around 700 students from grades 7 to 10 attended the first open plan high school in Tasmania. Over the years the school population declined and by the early 1990s the High School was considered for amalgamation. Ravenswood now has two schools, including Ravenswood Heights which formed at the end of the 1996 school year after the amalgamation of the three local schools Ravenswood High, Ravenswood Primary and East Ravenswood Primary. After the amalgamation Ravenswood Primary was closed and later re-opened as a special school. While Ravenswood High became the senior campus for grades 6-10 with East Ravenswood becoming the junior campus for grades 1-5 as well as having a kindergarten. The senior campus closed at the end of 1999 after many years of low enrolments, leaving remaining students to choose between nearby Brooks High School at Rocherlea or Queechy High School at Norwood.
