= South Springfield =

South Springfield Tasmania
- Coordinates: 41°14′49″S 147°30′19″E
- Population: 25 (2016 census)
- Postcode(s): 7260
- Location: 12 km (7 mi) S of Scottsdale
- LGA(s): Dorset
- Region: North-east
- State electorate(s): Bass
- Federal division(s): Bass
Localities around South Springfield:
| Springfield | Springfield | Springfield, Cuckoo |
| Springfield | South Springfield | Ringarooma |
| Springfield, Tayene | Tayene | Trenah |

South Springfield is a rural locality in the local government area of Dorset in the North-east region of Tasmania. It is located about 12 kilometres (7.5 mi) south of the town of Scottsdale. The 2016 census determined a population of 25 for the state suburb of South Springfield.

== History ==
South Springfield is a confirmed suburb/locality.

== Geography ==
The Great Forester River rises in the south-east and flows through to the north.

== Road infrastructure ==
The C407 route (Ten Mile Track) follows the northern boundary for a short distance. Route C406 (South Springfield Road) starts at an intersection with C407 and runs south and east to the centre of the locality, where it ends.
