= Tunnel, Tasmania =

Tunnel
- Town
- Coordinates: 41°11′39″S 147°10′32″E
- Country: Australia
- State: Tasmania
- Region: Northern Tasmania
- LGA: Launceston
- Location: 36 km (22 mi) N of Launceston

Government
  - State electorate: Bass
  - Federal division: Bass

Population
  - Total: 73 (2016 census)
- Postcode: 7254
Localities around Tunnel
Pipers River	Lebrina	Lebrina
Pipers River	Tunnel	Lebrina
Bangor	Bangor	Lilydale

Tunnel is a rural locality in the local government area of Launceston, in the Northern region of Tasmania. It is located about 36 kilometres (22 mi) north of the city of Launceston. The 2016 census determined a population of 73 for the state suburb of Tunnel.

== History ==
The locality was originally known as Cambanora for postal purposes. A railway tunnel through a range in the area was completed in 1889, and a nearby station was named "Tunnel". The locality was named Tunnel after the station.

== Road infrastructure ==
Route C820 route (The Paling Track / Bacala Road / Tunnel Road) enters from the south and exits to the east. The C821 route (an extension of Bacala Road) starts at an intersection with C820 near the southern boundary and exits to the south-east.
