= West Scottsdale =

- Town
- Coordinates: 41°11′18″S 147°26′19″E
- Country: Australia
- State: Tasmania
- Region: North-east
- LGA: Dorset
- Location: 10 km (6.2 mi) SW of Scottsdale

Government
  - State electorate: Bass
  - Federal division: Bass

Population
  - Total: 58 (2016 census)
- Postcode: 7260
Localities around West Scottsdale
Lietinna	Lietinna	Scottsdale
Nabowla	West Scottsdale	Springfield, Scottsdale
Nabowla	Springfield	Springfield

West Scottsdale is a rural locality in the local government area of Dorset in the North-east region of Tasmania. It is located about 10 kilometres (6.2 mi) south-west of the town of Scottsdale. The 2016 census determined a population of 58 for the state suburb of West Scottsdale.

== History ==
West Scottsdale was gazetted as a locality in 1956.

== Geography ==
The Brid River forms part of the eastern boundary and then flows through to the north-east.

== Road infrastructure ==
The C830 route (Sledge Track) enters from the south-east and runs north and east before exiting in the north-east.
