= White Hills, Tasmania =

White Hills Tasmania
- Coordinates: 41°30′51″S 147°15′28″E
- Population: 182 (2016 census)
- Postcode(s): 7258
- Location: 15 km (9 mi) SE of Launceston
- LGA(s): Launceston, Northern Midlands
- Region: Northern Tasmania, Central Tasmania
- State electorate(s): Bass, Lyons
- Federal division(s): Bass, Lyons
Localities around White Hills:
Relbia	Nunamara	Blessington
Relbia	White Hills	Blessington
Western Junction	Evandale	Evandale

White Hills is a semi-rural locality and town in the local government areas of Launceston and Northern Midlands, in the Northern and Central regions of Tasmania. It is located about 15 kilometres (9.3 mi) south-east of the city of Launceston. The 2016 census determined a population of 182 for the state suburb of White Hills.

== History ==
The name is believed to be related to the large number of white cockatoos in the area when it was first settled. It was gazetted as a locality in 1959.

== Geography ==
The North Esk River passes through the north-east corner and forms most of the northern boundary.

== Road infrastructure ==
Route C401 route (Blessington Road) enters from the north-west and runs through the locality and town before exiting to the south-east. The C412 route (White Hills Road) starts at an intersection with C401 in the north-west and exits to the south-west. The C414 route (Sawpit Hill Road) starts at an intersection with C401 in the south-east and exits to the south-east.
