= Bangor, Tasmania =

Bangor Tasmania
- Coordinates: 41°12′52″S 147°08′58″E
- Population: 76 (2016 census)
- Postcode(s): 7267
- Location: 31 km (19 mi) N of Launceston
- LGA(s): Launceston
- Region: Launceston
- State electorate(s): Bass
- Federal division(s): Bass
Localities around Bangor:
Pipers River	Pipers River, Tunnel	Tunnel
Lower Turners Marsh	Bangor	Lilydale
Karoola	Karoola	Karoola

Bangor is a rural locality in the local government area of Launceston, in the Launceston region of Tasmania. It is located about 31 kilometres (19 mi) north of the city of Launceston. The 2016 census determined a population of 76 for the state suburb of Bangor.

== History ==
The locality was gazetted in 1964.

== Geography ==
The Pipers River forms the western boundary.

== Road infrastructure ==
The C811 route (Bangor Road) enters from the south-west and runs through to the north-west before exiting. Route C820 (Paling Track) starts at an intersection with C811 and runs east before exiting, where it then follows the eastern boundary to the north for a short distance.
