= Patersonia, Tasmania =

Patersonia Tasmania
- Coordinates: 41°18′04″S 147°18′40″E
- Population: 85 (2016 census)
- Postcode(s): 7259
- Location: 32 km (20 mi) NE of Launceston
- LGA(s): Launceston
- Region: Northern Tasmania
- State electorate(s): Bass
- Federal division(s): Bass
Localities around Patersonia:
Lisle	Lisle, Nabowla	Nabowla
Underwood	Patersonia	Targa, Myrtle Bank
Nunamara	Nunamara	Nunamara

Patersonia is a rural locality in the local government area of Launceston, in the Northern region of Tasmania. It is located about 32 kilometres (20 mi) north-east of the city of Launceston. The 2016 census determined a population of 85 for the state suburb of Patersonia.

== History ==
Patersonia was named for Colonel William Paterson, Lieutenant Governor of the colony of New South Wales. The locality was gazetted in 1963.

== Geography ==
The St Patricks River forms the south-eastern boundary.

== Road infrastructure ==
The C854 route (Patersonia Road) enters from the south and exits to the north-east, where it then runs north along the eastern boundary. The C828 route (Targa Hill Road) starts at an intersection with C854 on the eastern boundary and runs away to the south-east. The C829 route (Pecks Hill Road) starts at an intersection with C854 in the centre of the locality and exits to the east.
