= Dilston, Tasmania =

Dilston Launceston, Tasmania
- Coordinates: 41°18′55″S 147°03′05″E
- Population: 558 (SAL 2021)
- Postcode(s): 7252
- Location: 17 km (11 mi) NW of Launceston
- LGA(s): Launceston
- Region: Launceston
- State electorate(s): Bass
- Federal division(s): Bass
Suburbs around Dilston:
Swan Bay	Mount Direction	Turners Marsh
Windermere, Tamar River	Dilston	Turners Marsh
Tamar River	Newnham	Rocherlea

Dilston is a rural and residential locality in the local government area (LGA) of Launceston in Tasmania. The locality is about 17 kilometres (11 mi) north-west of the city of Launceston. The 2021 census recorded a population of 558 for the state suburb of Dilston.

== History ==
Dilston was gazetted as a locality in 1963.

Dilston Post Office opened in 1871 and closed in 1975.

== Geography ==
The waters of the Tamar River form most of the western boundary.

== Road infrastructure ==
The East Tamar Highway (A8) enters from the south and runs through to the north, where it exits. Route C742 (John Lees Drive) runs parallel to and west of the A8 for a considerable distance, being joined to it at intersections in the south and north of the locality. Route C739 (Windermere Road) starts at an intersection with C742 and runs west until it exits.
