= Mowbray, Tasmania =

Mowbray Launceston, Tasmania
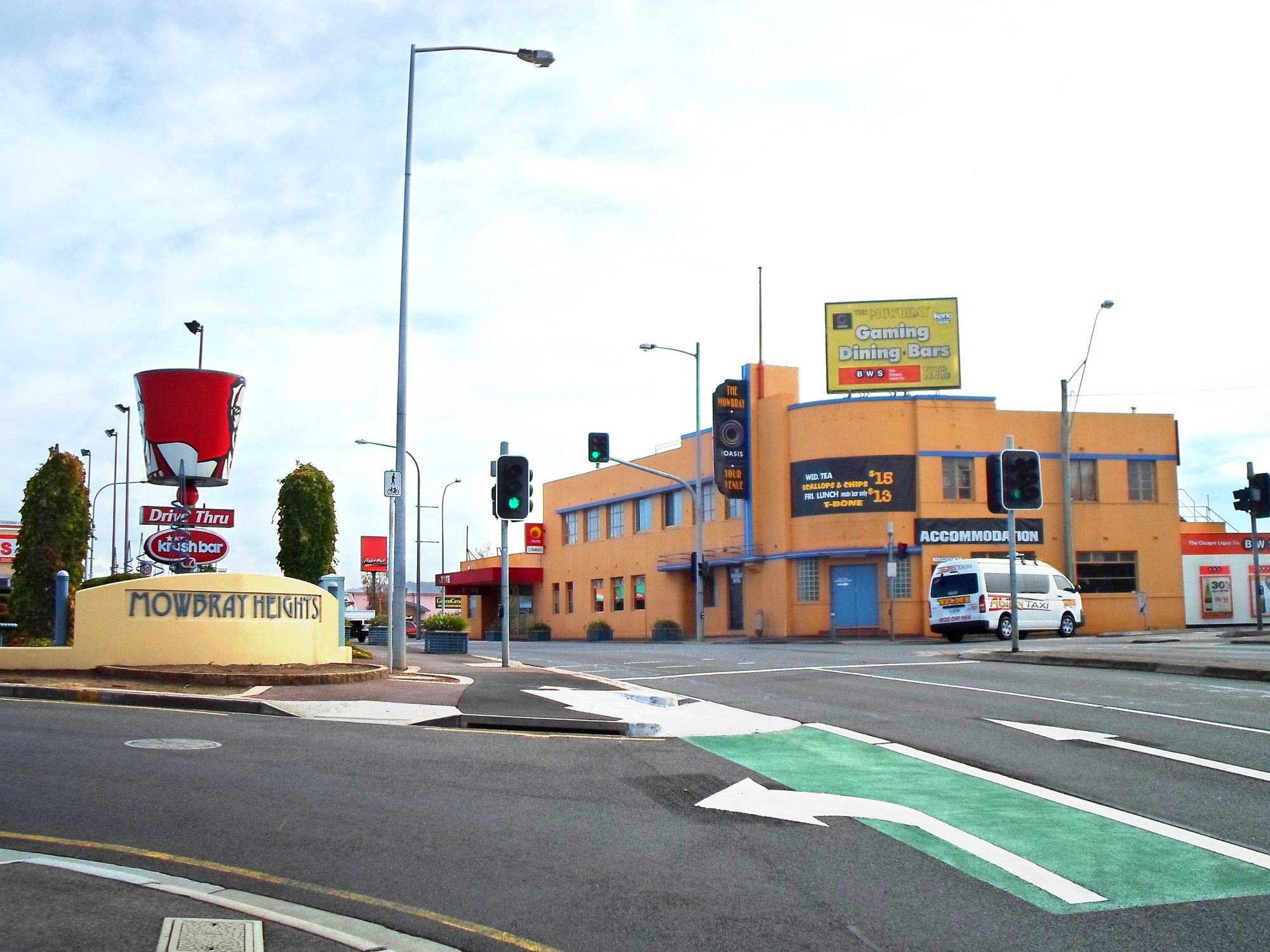
- Mowbray Hotel on the corner of Vermont Road and Invermay Road

- Coordinates: 41.409°S 147.143°E
- Population: 4,048 (SAL 2021)
- Postcode(s): 7248
- Area: 4.5 km^{2} (1.7 sq mi)
- Location: 3 km (2 mi) from Launceston
- LGA(s): City of Launceston
- State electorate(s): Bass
- Federal division(s): Bass
Suburbs around Mowbray:
Newnham	Mayfield	Rocherlea
Tamar River	Mowbray	Ravenswood
Invermay	Invermay	Ravenswood

Mowbray /ˈmoʊbreɪ/ is a suburb of Launceston in the Australian state of Tasmania and is the site of Mowbray Racecourse, home of the Launceston Cup. Mowbray also contains the minor suburbs of Mowbray Heights and Vermont. The suburb of Mowbray is located on a flat-topped, alluvial shelf, known as Mowbray Hill (formerly Paint Mine Hill), roughly 28m above the Tamar River and its flood plains.

== Origin of Name ==
The name "Mowbray" was adopted from an early homestead property formerly located within what is now the Launceston Church Grammar School, it was named and owned by Martin Mowbray Stephenson. The Mowbray Racecourse was a substantial part of this property, and racing meets have been held there from as early as 1830. The name itself stems back to Normandy in France and literally means "mud hill".

== Suburban development ==
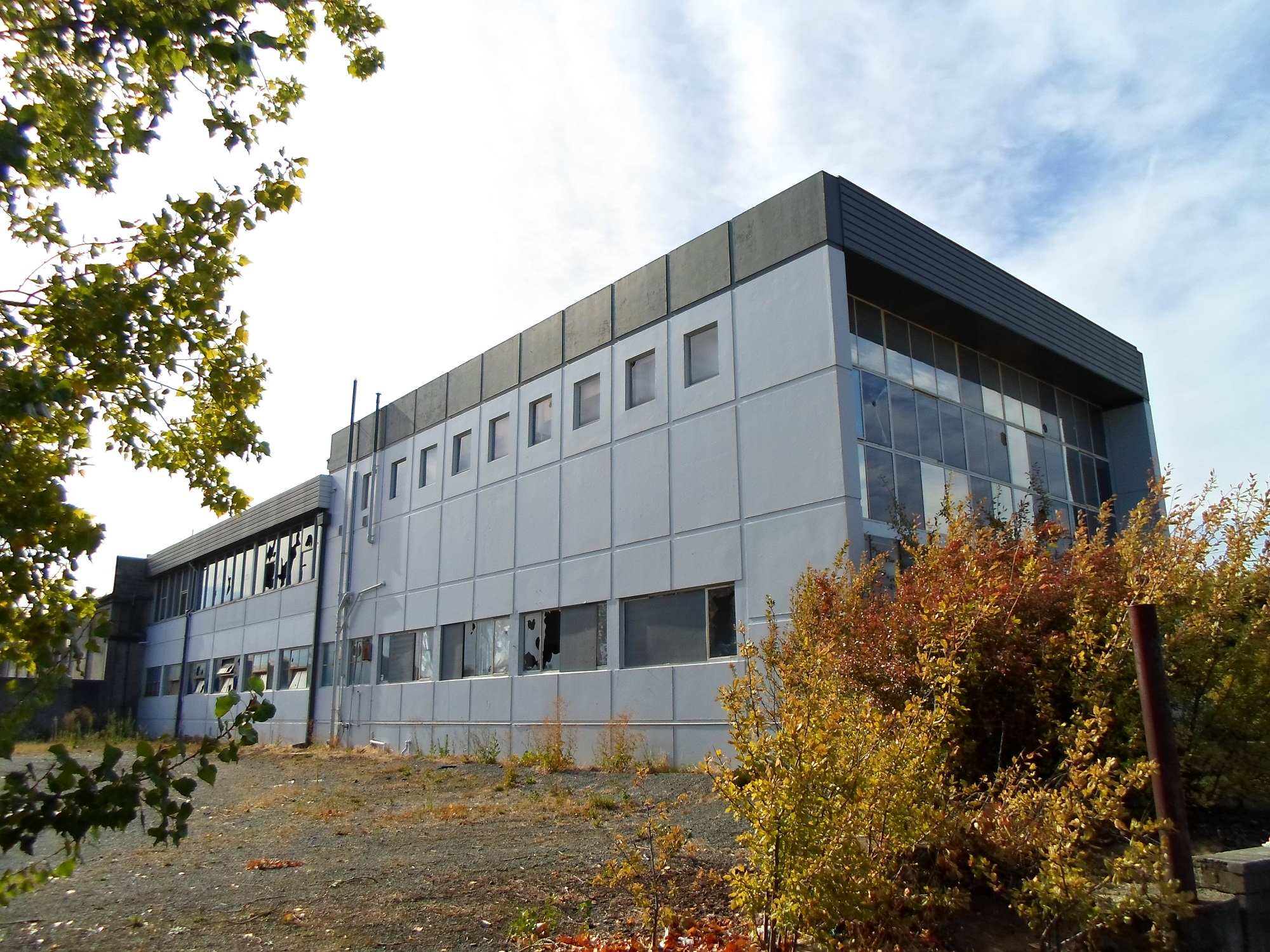
Former glass factory on Invermay Road.

Suburban development did not begin in Mowbray until the late 1800s when a small grid of streets was laid out on the southern slopes of the hill on the eastern side of Invermay Road and Button Street extending towards Launceston Church Grammar School.

After WW1 more streets were added north of Button Street and Vermont Road, forming a crude grid extending north towards Newnham, east towards the racecourse and west towards the escarpment where the hill drops into the Tamar River. These streets were named after allied soldiers and commanders who took part in the war such as Haig Street.
