= Karoola, Tasmania =

Karoola Tasmania
- Coordinates: 41°14′31″S 147°08′47″E
- Population: 318 (2016 census)
- Postcode(s): 7267
- Location: 26 km (16 mi) N of Launceston
- LGA(s): Launceston
- Region: Northern Tasmania
- State electorate(s): Bass
- Federal division(s): Bass
Localities around Karoola:
Lower Turners Marsh	Lower Turners Marsh, Bangor	Lilydale
Mount Direction	Karoola	Lalla
Mount Direction	Turners Marsh, Underwood	Underwood

Karoola is a rural locality and town in the local government area of Launceston, in the Northern region of Tasmania. It is located about 26 kilometres (16 mi) north of the city of Launceston. The 2016 census determined a population of 318 for the state suburb of Karoola.

== History ==
Prior to 1900 the area was called Turners Marsh Lower. Karoola is the Aboriginal name for Pipers River. The locality was gazetted in 1963.

During World War I, a requisitioned hospital ship was named after the town.

== Geography ==
Pipers River flows through the locality from south-east to north. It also forms a small part of the southern boundary and a section of the northern boundary.

== Road infrastructure ==
The B83 route (Pipers River Road) enters from the south and runs through to the north before exiting, where it follows the northern boundary for a short distance. Route C811 (Second River Road / Bangor Road) enters from the east and exits to the north. Route C823 (Karoola Road / Brown Mountain Road) starts at an intersection with B83 and runs south-east through the village of Karoola before exiting. Route C822 (Layla Road) starts at an intersection with C823 and exits to the east.
