= Lower Turners Marsh =

Lower Turners Marsh Tasmania
- Coordinates: 41°12′36″S 147°06′21″E
- Population: 37 (2016 census)
- Postcode(s): 7267
- Location: 34 km (21 mi) SE of George Town
- LGA(s): Launceston, George Town
- Region: Launceston, North-east
- State electorate(s): Bass
- Federal division(s): Bass
Localities around Lower Turners Marsh:
Pipers River	Pipers River	Pipers River
Mount Direction	Lower Turners Marsh	Bangor
Mount Direction	Karoola	Karoola

Lower Turners Marsh is a rural locality in the local government areas of Launceston and George Town in the Launceston and North-east regions of Tasmania. It is located about 34 kilometres (21 mi) south-east of the town of George Town. The 2016 census determined a population of 37 for the state suburb of Lower Turners Marsh.

== History ==
Lower Turners Marsh was gazetted as a locality in 1964.

== Geography ==
Pipers River forms a small section of the eastern boundary.

== Road infrastructure ==
Route B83 (Pipers River Road) passes through from south-east to north. The C811 route (Bangor Road) starts at an intersection with B83 and exits to the east. The C812 route (Old Bangor Tram Road) starts at an intersection with B83 and runs west through the locality before exiting.
