= Windermere, Tasmania =

Windermere Tasmania
- Coordinates: 41°18′44″S 147°01′03″E
- Population: 245 (2016 census)
- Postcode(s): 7252
- Location: 23 km (14 mi) NW of Launceston
- LGA(s): Launceston
- Region: Launceston
- State electorate(s): Bass
- Federal division(s): Bass
Localities around Windermere:
Swan Bay	Swan Bay	Dilston
Swan Bay	Windermere	Dilston
Tamar River	Tamar River	Dilston

Windermere is a rural locality in the local government area of Launceston in the Launceston region of Tasmania. It is located about 23 kilometres (14 mi) north-west of the town of Launceston. The 2016 census determined a population of 245 for the state suburb of Windermere.

== History ==
Windermere was gazetted as a locality in 1963.

== Geography ==
The Tamar River forms the southern boundary.

== Road infrastructure ==
The C739 route (Windermere Road) enters from the east and runs west and north before exiting in the north-west.
