= Springfield, Tasmania =

Springfield
- Town
- Coordinates: 41°12′28″S 147°30′40″E
- Country: Australia
- State: Tasmania
- Region: Launceston, North-east
- LGA: Launceston, Dorset
- Location: 8 km (5.0 mi) S of Scottsdale

Government
  - State electorate: Bass
  - Federal division: Bass

Population
  - Total: 188 (2016 census)
- Postcode: 7260
Localities around Springfield
West Scottsdale	Scottsdale	Scottsdale
Nabowla, Myrtle Bank	Springfield	Cuckoo
Targa	South Springfield	South Springfield

Springfield is a rural locality in the local government areas of Launceston and Dorset, in the Launceston and North-east regions of Tasmania. It is located about 8 kilometres (5.0 mi) south of the town of Scottsdale. The 2016 census determined a population of 188 for the state suburb of Springfield.

== History ==
The name Springfield was used for the area from 1876. It was gazetted as a locality in 1964.

== Geography ==
St Patricks River forms part of the southern boundary.

== Road infrastructure ==
The Tasman Highway (A3) passes through from south-west to north. The C406 route (South Springfield Road) starts at an intersection with A3 in the north and runs south-east before exiting. The C407 route (Ten Mile Track) starts at an intersection with A3 in the centre and exits to the north-east. The C830 route (Sledge Track) starts at an intersection with A3 in the centre and runs north before exiting to the north-west.
