= Upper Blessington =

- Town
- Coordinates: 41°27′34″S 147°35′07″E
- Country: Australia
- State: Tasmania
- Region: Launceston, North-east
- LGA: Launceston, Break O'Day
- Location: 48 km (30 mi) E of Launceston

Government
  - State electorate: Bass, Lyons
  - Federal division: Bass, Lyons

Population
  - Total: 60 (SAL 2021)
- Postcode: 7212
Localities around Upper Blessington
| Tayene | Tayene | Upper Esk |
| Burns Creek, Blessington | Upper Blessington | Upper Esk |
| Blessington | Ben Lomond National Park | Upper Esk |

Upper Blessington is a rural locality in the local government areas of Launceston and Break O'Day in the Launceston and North-east regions of Tasmania. It is located about 48 kilometres (30 mi) east of the town of Launceston.

== History ==
For the origin of the name, see Blessington, Tasmania.

Upper Blessington was gazetted as a locality in 1974.

The 2016 census determined a population of 61 for the state suburb of Upper Blessington. The 2021 census showed the number had dropped to 60.

== Geography ==
The North Esk River forms a small section of the northern boundary and then flows south through the locality before exiting in the south-west where it forms a section of that boundary.

== Road infrastructure ==
Route C401 (Blessington Road / Upper Blessington Road) passes through from west to east. The C405 route (Camden Road) starts at an intersection with C401 and exits to the north-west. The C432 route (Ben Lomond Road) starts at an intersection with C401 and runs south-east before exiting.
