= Targa, Tasmania =

Targa Tasmania
- Coordinates: 41°18′49″S 147°22′51″E
- Population: 38 (2016 census)
- Postcode(s): 7259
- Location: 33 km (21 mi) NE of Launceston
- LGA(s): Launceston
- Region: Northern Tasmania
- State electorate(s): Bass
- Federal division(s): Bass
Localities around Targa:
Myrtle Bank	Springfield	Tayene
Myrtle Bank	Targa	Tayene
Nunamara	Nunamara	Nunamara

Targa is a rural locality in the local government area of Launceston, in the Northern region of Tasmania. It is located about 33 kilometres (21 mi) north-east of the city of Launceston. The 2016 census determined a population of 38 for the state suburb of Targa.

== History ==
Targa is an Aboriginal word for “cry”. The locality was gazetted in 1963.

== Geography ==
The St Patricks River forms most of the western boundary, and all of the northern and north-eastern boundaries.

== Road infrastructure ==
The Tasman Highway (A3) enters from the south-west and runs through to the north-West. The C405 route (Camden Hill Road) starts at an intersection with the A3 and runs through to the east. The C828 route (Targa Hill Road) starts at an intersection with the A3 and exits to the west.
