= Nabowla, Tasmania =

Nabowla
- Town
- Coordinates: 41°09′37″S 147°22′07″E
- Country: Australia
- State: Tasmania
- Region: North-east
- LGA: Dorset
- Location: 16 km (9.9 mi) W of Scottsdale

Government
  - State electorate: Bass
  - Federal division: Bass

Population
  - Total: 112 (2016 census)
- Postcode: 7260
Localities around Nabowla
Bridport	Bridport	Bridport
Golconda	Nabowla	Blumont, West Scottsdale, Springfield
Lisle	Lisle, Myrtle Bank, Springfield	Springfield

Nabowla is a rural locality in the local government area of Dorset in the North-east region of Tasmania. It is located about 16 kilometres (9.9 mi) west of the town of Scottsdale. The 2016 census determined a population of 112 for the state suburb of Nabowla.

== History ==
Nabowla is an Aboriginal word meaning river. The locality was gazetted in 1964.

== Geography ==
The Denison River and Little Forester River each form part of the western boundary. The Bridestowe Lavender Estate is within the locality.

== Road infrastructure ==
The B81 route (Golconda Road) enters from the west and passes through to the east. Route C827 (Bridport Back Road) starts at an intersection with B81 and runs north before exiting.

== Notable people ==
- James McQueen (1934–1998) was an Australian novelist and short story writer who lived on a farm in Nabowla for much of his career. He was a prolific author, publishing around 170 stories and winning more than 50 literary awards for his work.
