= Underwood, Tasmania =

Underwood Tasmania
- Coordinates: 41°17′34″S 147°12′18″E
- Population: 391 (SAL 2021)
- Postcode(s): 7268
- Location: 22 km (14 mi) NE of Launceston
- LGA(s): Launceston
- Region: Northern Tasmania
- State electorate(s): Bass
- Federal division(s): Bass
Localities around Underwood:
Karoola	Lilydale	Lisle
Turners Marsh	Underwood	Patersonia
Rocherlea	Rocherlea	Nunamara

Underwood is a rural locality and town in the local government area of Launceston, in the Northern region of Tasmania. It is located about 22 kilometres (14 mi) north-east of the city of Launceston.

== History ==
The area was first settled in 1854, and by the 1860s a village named Underwood existed. The locality was gazetted in 1963.

The 2016 census determined a population of 363 for the state suburb of Underwood. At the 2021 census, its population had grown to 391.

== Geography ==
Pipers River rises in the north-east and flows through to the north-west.

== Road infrastructure ==
The B81 route (Lilydale Road) enters from the south-west and runs through to the north before exiting. Route B83 (Pipers River Road) starts at an intersection with B81 in the south-west corner and exits to the north. Route C823 (Underwood Road / Brown Mountain Road) starts at an intersection with B81 and runs north-west through the village of Underwood before exiting. Route C824 (Prossers Road) starts at an intersection with B81 and exits to the south-east.
