= Myrtle Bank, Tasmania =

Myrtle Bank Tasmania
- Coordinates: 41°17′56″S 147°22′27″E
- Population: 40 (2016 census)
- Postcode(s): 7259
- Location: 34 km (21 mi) NE of Launceston
- LGA(s): Launceston
- Region: Northern Tasmania
- State electorate(s): Bass
- Federal division(s): Bass
Localities around Myrtle Bank:
Lisle	Lisle, Nabowla	Nabowla
Patersonia	Myrtle Bank	Targa
Patersonia	Patersonia	Targa

Myrtle Bank is a rural locality in the local government area of Launceston, in the Northern region of Tasmania. It is located about 34 kilometres (21 mi) north-east of the city of Launceston. The 2016 census determined a population of 40 for the state suburb of Myrtle Bank.

== History ==
The locality was gazetted in 1963.

== Geography ==
The St Patricks River forms part of the south-eastern boundary.

== Road infrastructure ==
The Tasman Highway (A3) passes through the eastern corner of the locality. The C828 route (Targa Hill Road) enters from the south-east and runs through to the south-west boundary, where it ends.
