= Blessington, Tasmania =

Blessington Tasmania
- Coordinates: 41°31′18″S 147°26′50″E
- Population: 93 (2016 census)
- Postcode(s): 7212
- Location: 32 km (20 mi) SE of Launceston
- LGA(s): Launceston, Northern Midlands
- Region: Northern Tasmania, Central Tasmania
- State electorate(s): Bass, Lyons
- Federal division(s): Bass, Lyons
Localities around Blessington:
White Hills	Nunamara	Burns Creek
Evandale, White Hills	Blessington	Upper Blessington, Burns Creek
Evandale	Deddington	Deddington

Blessington is a rural locality in the local government areas of Launceston and Northern Midlands, in the Northern and Central regions of Tasmania. It is located about 32 kilometres (20 mi) south-east of the city of Launceston. The 2016 census determined a population of 93 for the state suburb of Blessington.

== History ==
The area was named for Countess Blessington. She was the sister of Robert Power, who was the Surveyor General of Van Diemen's Land (now Tasmania) from 1841 to 1857. It was gazetted as a locality in 1959.

== Geography ==
The North Esk River flows through from east to west.

== Road infrastructure ==
Route C401 route (Blessington Road) enters from the west and runs through to the east. The C420 route (Deddington Road) starts at an intersection with C401 and runs to the south-east before exiting. The C413 route (Sawpit Hill Road) starts at an intersection with C420 and runs through to the west before exiting. The C415 route (Musselboro Road) starts at an intersection with C401 and runs through to the north-east before exiting.
