= Relbia, Tasmania =

Relbia Tasmania
- Coordinates: 41°30′36″S 147°12′36″E
- Population: 678 (2016 census)
- Postcode(s): 7258
- Location: 12 km (7 mi) SE of Launceston
- LGA(s): Launceston, Northern Midlands
- Region: Northern Tasmania, Central Tasmania
- State electorate(s): Bass, Lyons
- Federal division(s): Bass, Lyons
Localities around Relbia:
Youngtown	Norwood	St Leonards
Breadalbane	Relbia	White Hills
Western Junction	Evandale	White Hills

Relbia is a semi-rural locality and town in the local government areas of Launceston and Northern Midlands, in the Northern and Central regions of Tasmania. It is located about 12 kilometres (7.5 mi) south-east of the city of Launceston. The 2016 census determined a population of 678 for the state suburb of Relbia.

== History ==
The name Relbia comes from a property settled in the area prior to 1850. It is an Aboriginal word meaning “long way, long time”. It was gazetted as a locality in 1959.

== Geography ==
The North Esk River forms the north-eastern boundary. The Western Rail Line runs along the south-western boundary, through the west of the locality and the town, and then along the north-western boundary.

== Road infrastructure ==
Route C411 route (Relbia Road) starts at the southern boundary and runs through to the north-west.
