= Rocherlea, Tasmania =

Rocherlea
- Suburb
- Interactive map of Rocherlea
- Coordinates: 41°22′41″S 147°08′08″E
- Country: Australia
- State: Tasmania
- Region: Launceston
- City: Launceston
- LGA: City of Launceston
- Location: 9 km (5.6 mi) N of Launceston

Government
  - State electorate: Bass
  - Federal division: Bass

Population
  - Total: 1,081 (2016 census)
- Postcode: 7248
Suburbs around Rocherlea
| Dilston | Underwood | Pipers River |
| Newnham | Rocherlea | Nunamara |
| Mowbray | Mayfield | Nunamara |

Rocherlea is a residential locality in the local government area (LGA) of Launceston in the Launceston LGA region of Tasmania. The locality is about 9 kilometres (5.6 mi) north of the town of Launceston. The 2016 census recorded a population of 1081 for the state suburb of Rocherlea. It is a northern suburb of Launceston, about ten minutes drive from the Launceston CBD and on the way to Lilydale. It has a community centre, church and op shop.

== History ==
Rocherlea was gazetted as a locality in 1963.

The suburb was named after the Town Clerk's family "Rocher" and was originally referred to as "Rocher's Lane" before being officially gazetted as Rocherlea in 1963.

== Geography ==
Almost all of the boundaries are survey lines.

== Road infrastructure ==
Route B81 (Lilydale Road)(George Town Road) runs through from west to north.
