= City of Launceston =

Launceston City Council
- Local government area
- Interactive map of Launceston City Council
- Coordinates: 41.3605°S 147.3044°E
- Country: Australia
- State: Tasmania
- Region: Launceston and surrounds
- Established: 1 January 1853
- Council seat: Launceston

Government
  - Mayor: Matthew Garwood
  - State electorates: Bass; Lyons
  - Federal divisions: Bass; Lyons

Area
  - Total: 1,414 km^{2} (546 sq mi)

Population
  - Total: 70,055 (2021)
  - Density: 49.544/km^{2} (128.32/sq mi)
- Website: Launceston City Council
LGAs around Launceston City Council
West Tamar	George Town	Dorset
West Tamar	Launceston City Council	Break O'Day
Meander Valley	Northern Midlands	Northern Midlands

Launceston City Council (or City of Launceston) is a local government body in Tasmania, located in the city and surrounds of Launceston in the north of the state. The Launceston local government area is classified as urban, encompassing localities including Lilydale, Targa and through to Swan Bay on the eastern side of the Tamar River.

== Government ==
The current mayor is Matthew Garwood, elected in 2023.

Name	Position
Matthew Garwood	Mayor/councillor
Hugh McKenzie	Deputy mayor/councillor
Danny Gibson	Councillor
Andrea Dawkins	Councillor
Alan Harris	Councillor
Tim Walker	Councillor
George Razay	Councillor
Joe Pentridge	Councillor
Andrew Palmer	Councillor
Lindi McMahon	Councillor
Susie Cai	Councillor
Alex Britton	Councillor

== History and attributes ==
Launceston is classified as urban, regional and medium (URM) under the Australian Classification of Local Governments. The population at the 2016 census was over 65,000, making Launceston the most populous of the 29 local government areas in Tasmania.

The municipality logo features the now extinct Tasmanian tiger, an indigenous marsupial that used to be prevalent in the Launceston district.

=== History ===
Launceston was first declared as a municipality in 1853 and declared a city in 1888. Its original boundaries have long since been redefined and the area now known as the City of Launceston includes parts of the former Lilydale, St Leonard's, Evandale and Westbury Municipalities. In the 1890s, the municipality grew to include Galvin Town (South Launceston) and in 1906 to include the northern suburbs of Invermay, Mowbray and Trevallyn. This has produced a local government area that overlaps its similarly named city, rather than either being contained by or encompassing it.

Women were ineligible to stand for election to the Launceston City Council until 1945, despite being granted the same rights at federal and state level in 1902 and 1921, respectively.

== Localities ==
=== Localities other than suburbs ===
• Bangor • Blessington • Burns Creek • Golconda • Karoola • Lalla • Lebrina • Lilydale • Lower Turners Marsh • Mount Direction • Myrtle Bank • North Lilydale • Nunamara • Patersonia • Pipers Brook • Pipers River • Prospect Vale • Relbia • Retreat • Springfield • Swan Bay • Targa • Tayene • Tunnel • Turners Marsh • Underwood • Upper Blessington • White Hills • Windermere • Wyena

== Sister city relations ==
- (United States) – Napa, California, USA

== Homelessness ==
Homelessness in Launceston has been a growing problem. Launceston City Council does not hold or track statistics on homelessness but relies on Homes Tasmania to do so.

=== 2024 Strike it Out, Inc Removal ===
A local charity named Strike it Out, Inc was forced to remove sleeping trailers during the middle of winter with recorded overnight minimum temperatures of -3°, which the charity acquired to alleviate the situation of rough sleepers sleeping in freezing conditions in Launceston City during the winter periods after a long running tussle between the council and the charity. The Launceston City Council rejected any blame, releasing a press release on 1 July 2024 after media scrutiny following the removal of the pods.

The charity has been attempting to get permits from the council for the infrastructure but the council had imposed ad-hoc arbitrary conditions, including compliance with a privacy act it has no enforcement jurisdiction on. The council does not have any general policy of approving homeless accommodation providers' proposals or requests.

== See also ==
- Local government areas of Tasmania
