= North Eastern Football Union =

- Founded: 1907
- Formerly named: North East Football Association
- Ceased: 2017

The North Eastern Football Union (NEFU) was an Australian Rules football competition in North-Eastern Tasmania, Australia.

== History ==
Competition football began in North-Eastern Tasmania in the early 1900s during the region's tin mining boom. There were many small associations existing in the area from Scottsdale to Goulds Country. The volatility of the mining and logging industries in the region had a resultant effect on the football scene, with the number of active clubs and associations varying greatly from year to year in the years leading up to World War II.

The NEFU had its origins in the North East Coast Football Association, formed in 1907 by the Derby, Branxholm, Pioneer and Moorina clubs. The fledgling competition would change its name to the North Eastern Football Association a year later. The early years of the Association featured only sporadic competition. World War I forced football in the region into recess between 1915 and 1918. Additionally, some years the Association did not form at all, with football between clubs in the Scottsdale and Dorset region taking place in the form of competition for the Blundstone Cup - a challenge competition in which clubs could challenge the holder of the cup, donated by the Hobart-based Blundstone company, in order to win the right to hold it. Between 1910-1911 and 1919-1921 Blundstone Cup competition was the only form of organised football in the area.

The North-Eastern Association was re-established in 1922 with four clubs - Branxholm, Derby, Derby Militia and Ringarooma. By 1924 the competition had expanded to 6 clubs with the addition of Legerwood and Winnaleah. The increased standard of football created a desire in the region for an all-encompassing "Union" of football in the Scottsdale-Dorset area, culminating in the admission of Scottsdale in 1925, on the condition that they split into two teams to ensure a fair competition, which was accepted. The name of the competition was changed to "North Eastern Football Union" to reflect this new addition. Branxholm and Legerwood chose to amalgamate prior to the 1925 season to ensure they would be able to field a competitive side from players in their selection radius. The combined club became known as Wanderers.

Although the new Union was initially successful, a shortage of players forced Wanderers and Winnaleah into recess in 1927, leaving the Union with only 4 clubs. This prompted Scottsdale to leave and re-form their own association in 1929. The North Eastern Football Association name was re-adopted in 1930 to reflect Scottsdale's departure.

The Great Depression brought about a fall in the fortunes of the NEFA in the early 1930s, with the 1932 season featuring just three clubs after Derby left to form its own association. However by 1936 they had returned and the number of clubs had rebounded to six. An attempt to establish an 8-team competition featuring clubs between Scottsdale and Pioneer did not succeed, however the competition was reconstituted as the North Eastern Football Union, with six clubs - Alberton, Derby, Legerwood, Pioneer, Warrentinna and Winnaleah - participating. Scottsdale re-joined a year later, while Warrentinna and Legerwood merged to re-form the Wanderers club. The Union went into recess due to World War II in 1941.

Following the re-establishment of football in 1945, the NEFU entered a period of relative stability, with the only major change for the next two decades being the departure of Scottsdale to the NTFA in 1948. Legerwood replaced them the following year. During this period the Wanderers club became known primarily as Branxholm owing to playing its games there, with the Wanderers name becoming the club's nickname.

Legerwood folded after the 1964 season, followed by Derby in 1972 and Pioneer-Gladstone in 1978. The re-formed Bridport club joined in 1967, followed by Scottsdale Crows in 1982, Lilydale from the Tamar Football Association in 1985 and St Helens from the Fingal District Football Association in 1993. The addition of Fingal from recess in 1997 saw the NEFU's number of clubs peak at 8 in the early 2000s. This would not last, however. Fingal folded again after the 2001 season and Lilydale departed for the NTFA in 2011. The lack of population in the area caused the historic Ringarooma and Branxholm clubs to fold after the 2011 and 2015 seasons respectively, sounding the death knell for the NEFU. After Bridport and St Helens left for the NTFA in 2017, the only remaining clubs were Winnaleah and the Scottsdale Crows. In a farcical situation, Winnaleah defeated the Crows in all 12 home and away matches and the grand final. The Crows folded soon after. Winnaleah applied to join the NTFA but were rejected, so the club were forced to fold at the season's end, bringing an end to over 100 years of competition.

== Clubs ==
=== Final ===
| Club | Colours | Nickname | Home Ground | Former League | Est. | Years in NEFU | NEFU Premierhips | | Fate |
| Club | Colours | Nickname | Home Ground | Former League | Est. | Years in NEFU | Total | Years | Fate |
|---|---|---|---|---|---|---|---|---|---|
| Scottsdale Crows | (1982-?)(?-2017) | Crows | Scottsdale Recreation Ground, Scottsdale | – | 1982 | 1982-2017 | 3 | 1989, 1990, 2006 | Folded after 2017 season |
| Winnaleah | (1925)(c.1940s-90s)(2000s-17) | Magpies | Winnaleah Sports Ground, Winnaleah | CFA | 1905 | 1924-1926, 1929-1932, 1936-2017 | 14 | 1932, 1940, 1945, 1965, 1972, 1974, 1985, 2003, 2004, 2005, 2011, 2012, 2016, 2017 | Recess between 1926-29. and 1933-35. Folded after 2017 season |

=== Former ===
| Club | Colours | Nickname | Home Ground | Former League | Est. | Years in NEFU | NEFU Premierhips | | Fate |
| Club | Colours | Nickname | Home Ground | Former League | Est. | Years in NEFU | Total | Years | Fate |
|---|---|---|---|---|---|---|---|---|---|
| Alberton | | | Ringarooma Sports Ground, Ringarooma | – | 1930 | 1933-1938 | 2 | 1933, 1937 | Folded after 1938 season |
| Branxholm (Wanderers 1938-51) | (1931)(?-2015) | Wanderers | Branxholm Recreation Ground, Branxholm | – | 1910 | 1907-1909, 1914, 1922, 1924, 1931-1936, 1938-2015 | 18 | 1934, 1938, 1948, 1951, 1956, 1958, 1959, 1961, 1962, 1963, 1964, 1966, 1970, 1979, 1987, 1995, 1996, 2014 | Merged with Legerwood to form Wanderers in 1925. Recess in 1936. Folded after 2015 season |
| Branxholm Rovers | | | Branxholm Recreation Ground, Branxholm | – | 1923 | 1923 | 0 | - | Merged with Branxholm Stars to re-form Branxholm in 1924 |
| Branxholm Stars | | | Branxholm Recreation Ground, Branxholm | – | 1923 | 1923 | 0 | - | Merged with Branxholm Rovers to re-form Branxholm in 1924 |
| Bridport | | Seagulls | Bridport Oval, Bridport | MSFA | 1934 | 1967-2016 | 8 | 1973, 1982, 1999, 2001, 2002, 2013, 2015 | Moved to NTFA after 2016 season |
| Derby | (1912, 28) (1925)(?-1972) | Miners, Two Blues | Derby Oval, Derby | DFA | 1906 | 1907-1909, 1912-1914, 1922-1931, 1936-1972 | 10 | 1907, 1909, 1912, 1936, 1949, 1950, 1953, 1954, 1957, 1960 | Played in Derby FA between 1932-35. Folded after 1972 season |
| Derby City | | | Derby Oval, Derby | – | 1913 | 1913-1914, 1923-1924 | 2 | 1913, 1914 | Folded after 1924 season. Re-formed in Derby FA in 1932. |
| Derby Militia | | | Derby Oval, Derby | – | 1922 | 1922 | 0 | - | Folded after 1922 season |
| East Coast Swans (St Helens 1993-2014) | (1993-2012)(2013-15) | Swans | St Helens Recreation Reserve, St Helens | FDFA | 1910 | 1993-2016 | 2 | 1997, 2000 | Moved to NTFA after 2016 season |
| Fingal | | Country Blues | Fingal Recreation Ground, Fingal | NTFA | 1884 | 1997-2001 | 1 | 1998 | Entered recess after 2001 season, later re-formed in NTFA |
| Forester juniors | | | | | 1913 | 1922 | 0 | - | Played 1 season in the junior grade in 1922 |
| Gladstone | | | Gladstone Recreation Ground, Gladstone | CFA | 1936 | 1939, 1947 | 0 | - | Merged with Pioneer to form Pioneer-Gladstone in 1948 |
| Legerwood | (1923) (1950s) | | Legerwood Football Ground, Legerwood | – | 1923 | 1923-1924, 1933-1937, 1949-1964 | 2 | 1924, 1952 | Merged with Branxholm to form Wanderers in 1925. Merged with Warrentinna to form Wanderers in 1938. Folded after 1964 season |
| Lilydale | | Demons | Lilydale Recreation Ground, Lilydale | TFA | 1921 | 1985-2010 | 7 | 1986, 1988, 1992, 1994, 2007, 2009, 2010 | Moved to NTFA after 2010 season |
| Moorina (Frome 1908) | | | Moorina Recreation Ground, Moorina | – | 1902 | 1907-1908, 1912-1913 | 0 | - | Entered recess in 1909 and 1914 |
| North Scottsdale | | | Scottsdale Recreation Ground, Scottsdale | – | 1925 | 1925 | 0 | - | Merged with Scottsdale Central to re-form Scottsdale in 1926 |
| Pioneer | | | Pioneer Football Ground, Pioneer | CFA | 1907 | 1907-1909, 1912-1914, 1926-1930, 1937-1947 | 1 | 1908 | 1931-32 unknown, formed Coasters' FA in 1933. Merged with Gladstone to form Pioneer-Gladstone after 1947 seadon |
| Pioneer-Gladstone | | | Pioneer Football Ground, Pioneer | – | 1948 | 1948-1978 | 4 | 1967, 1976, 1977, 1978 | Folded after 1978 season |
| Ringarooma | (1925-?)(?-1960s)('60s-2011) | Robins | Ringarooma Sports Ground, Ringarooma | – | 1911 | 1912, 1922-1936, 1939-2011 | 15 | 1922, 1923, 1930, 1931, 1955, 1968, 1969, 1971, 1975, 1980, 1981, 1983, 1984, 1991, 2008 | Entered recess in 1913 and 1937-38. Folded after 2011 season |
| Scottsdale | (1926-?) (?-1948) | | Scottsdale Recreation Ground, Scottsdale | – | 1889 | 1926-1928, 1938-1948 | 5 | 1926, 1927, 1928, 1946, 1947 | Moved to NTFA after 1948 season |
| Scottsdale Central | | | Scottsdale Recreation Ground, Scottsdale | – | 1925 | 1925 | 0 | - | Merged with North Scottsdale to re-form Scottsdale in 1926 |
| Springfield | | Demons | Springfield Recreation Ground, Springfield | MSFA | 1922 | 1945-1947 | 0 | - | Moved to Scottsdale FA in 1948 |
| Wanderers | (1925) (1928) | | Branxholm Recreation Ground, Branxholm and Legerwood Football Ground, Legerwood | – | 1925 | 1925-1930 | 2 | 1925, 1929 | Replaced by Branxholm after 1931 season |
| Warrentinna | | | Warrentinna Football Ground, Warrentinna | MSFA | 1936 | 1937 | 0 | - | Merged with Legerwood to form Wanderers in 1938 |
| West Scottsdale | | | Scottsdale Recreation Ground, Scottsdale | – | 1946 | 1946-1947 | 0 | - | Moved to Scottsdale FA in 1948 |

== 2007 Ladder ==
| North Eastern FU | Wins | Byes | Losses | Draws | For | Against | % | Pts | Final | Team | G | B | Pts | Team | G | B | Pts |
|---|---|---|---|---|---|---|---|---|---|---|---|---|---|---|---|---|---|
| Lilydale | 15 | 3 | 0 | 1 | 2503 | 839 | 298.33% | 62 | 1st Semi | St Helens | 17 | 9 | 111 | Winnaleah | 16 | 6 | 102 |
| Scottsdale Crows | 11 | 3 | 5 | 0 | 1921 | 1446 | 132.85% | 44 | 2nd Semi | Lilydale | 12 | 8 | 80 | Scottsdale | 8 | 13 | 61 |
| Winnaleah | 9 | 3 | 7 | 0 | 1623 | 1496 | 108.49% | 36 | Preliminary | Scottsdale | 19 | 20 | 134 | St Helens | 7 | 7 | 49 |
| St Helens | 7 | 3 | 9 | 0 | 1433 | 1720 | 83.31% | 28 | Grand | Lilydale | 23 | 11 | 149 | Scottsdale | 15 | 8 | 98 |
| Bridport | 7 | 3 | 9 | 0 | 1542 | 1886 | 81.76% | 28 | | | | | | | | | |
| Branxholm | 4 | 3 | 11 | 1 | 1264 | 1786 | 70.77% | 18 | | | | | | | | | |
| Ringarooma | 2 | 3 | 14 | 0 | 1195 | 2308 | 51.78% | 8 | | | | | | | | | |

== 2008 Ladder ==
| North Eastern FU | Wins | Byes | Losses | Draws | For | Against | % | Pts | Final | Team | G | B | Pts | Team | G | B | Pts |
|---|---|---|---|---|---|---|---|---|---|---|---|---|---|---|---|---|---|
| Lilydale | 16 | 0 | 0 | 0 | 2931 | 756 | 387.70% | 64 | 1st Semi | St Helens | 13 | 10 | 88 | Scottsdale | 11 | 10 | 76 |
| Ringarooma | 14 | 0 | 2 | 0 | 2382 | 1132 | 210.42% | 56 | 2nd Semi | Lilydale | 19 | 13 | 127 | Ringarooma | 9 | 15 | 69 |
| Scottsdale Crows | 10 | 0 | 6 | 0 | 1769 | 1531 | 115.55% | 40 | Preliminary | Ringarooma | 12 | 13 | 85 | St Helens | 10 | 13 | 73 |
| St Helens | 7 | 0 | 9 | 0 | 1740 | 1554 | 111.97% | 28 | Grand | Ringarooma | 16 | 8 | 104 | Lilydale | 10 | 8 | 68 |
| Winnaleah | 7 | 0 | 9 | 0 | 1263 | 1920 | 65.78% | 28 | | | | | | | | | |
| Bridport | 2 | 0 | 14 | 0 | 1094 | 2403 | 45.53% | 8 | | | | | | | | | |
| Branxholm | 0 | 0 | 16 | 0 | 838 | 2721 | 30.80% | 0 | | | | | | | | | |

== 2009 Ladder ==
| North Eastern FU | Wins | Byes | Losses | Draws | For | Against | % | Pts | Final | Team | G | B | Pts | Team | G | B | Pts |
|---|---|---|---|---|---|---|---|---|---|---|---|---|---|---|---|---|---|
| Lilydale | 13 | 0 | 2 | 1 | 2413 | 953 | 253.20% | 54 | 1st Semi | Ringarooma | 14 | 14 | 98 | Branxholm | 3 | 7 | 25 |
| Winnaleah | 13 | 0 | 3 | 0 | 1677 | 1119 | 149.87% | 52 | 2nd Semi | Lilydale | 14 | 14 | 98 | Winnaleah | 5 | 8 | 38 |
| Ringarooma | 10 | 0 | 5 | 1 | 1814 | 1050 | 172.76% | 42 | Preliminary | Winnaleah | 6 | 6 | 42 | Ringarooma | 2 | 9 | 21 |
| Branxholm | 10 | 0 | 6 | 0 | 1713 | 1236 | 138.59% | 40 | Grand | Lilydale | 21 | 17 | 143 | Winnaleah | 8 | 6 | 54 |
| St Helens | 5 | 0 | 11 | 0 | 1187 | 1621 | 73.23% | 20 | | | | | | | | | |
| Bridport | 2 | 0 | 14 | 0 | 998 | 1987 | 50.23% | 8 | | | | | | | | | |
| Scottsdale Crows | 2 | 0 | 14 | 0 | 613 | 2449 | 25.03% | 8 | | | | | | | | | |

== 2010 Ladder ==
| North Eastern FU | Wins | Byes | Losses | Draws | For | Against | % | Pts | Final | Team | G | B | Pts | Team | G | B | Pts |
|---|---|---|---|---|---|---|---|---|---|---|---|---|---|---|---|---|---|
| Lilydale | 14 | 3 | 2 | 0 | 2394 | 897 | 266.89% | 56 | 1st Semi | Ringarooma | 15 | 8 | 98 | Branxholm | 10 | 13 | 73 |
| St Helens | 12 | 3 | 4 | 0 | 1728 | 1264 | 136.71% | 48 | 2nd Semi | Lilydale | 19 | 18 | 132 | St Helens | 12 | 9 | 81 |
| Branxholm | 8 | 3 | 7 | 1 | 1541 | 1533 | 100.52% | 34 | Preliminary | Ringarooma | 6 | 8 | 44 | St Helens | 3 | 9 | 27 |
| Ringarooma | 8 | 3 | 7 | 1 | 1300 | 1304 | 99.69% | 34 | Grand | Lilydale | 12 | 7 | 79 | Ringarooma | 11 | 7 | 73 |
| Winnaleah | 7 | 3 | 9 | 0 | 1317 | 1452 | 90.70% | 28 | | | | | | | | | |
| Bridport | 6 | 3 | 10 | 0 | 1375 | 1720 | 79.94% | 24 | | | | | | | | | |
| Scottsdale Crows | 0 | 3 | 16 | 0 | 779 | 2264 | 34.41% | 0 | | | | | | | | | |

== 2011 Ladder ==
| North Eastern FU | Wins | Byes | Losses | Draws | For | Against | % | Pts | Final | Team | G | B | Pts | Team | G | B | Pts |
|---|---|---|---|---|---|---|---|---|---|---|---|---|---|---|---|---|---|
| Ringarooma | 14 | 0 | 2 | 0 | 1909 | 908 | 210.24% | 56 | 1st Semi | Winnaleah | 7 | 10 | 52 | Bridport | 6 | 6 | 42 |
| Branxholm | 13 | 0 | 3 | 0 | 1552 | 913 | 169.99% | 52 | 2nd Semi | Ringarooma | 12 | 12 | 84 | Branxholm | 6 | 9 | 45 |
| Winnaleah | 8 | 0 | 8 | 0 | 1346 | 1257 | 107.08% | 32 | Preliminary | Winnaleah | 17 | 7 | 109 | Branxholm | 8 | 8 | 56 |
| Bridport | 7 | 0 | 9 | 0 | 1318 | 1490 | 88.46% | 28 | Grand | Winnaleah | 13 | 9 | 87 | Ringarooma | 9 | 6 | 60 |
| St Helens | 6 | 0 | 10 | 0 | 1260 | 1584 | 79.55% | 24 | | | | | | | | | |
| Scottsdale Crows | 0 | 0 | 16 | 0 | 711 | 1944 | 36.57% | 0 | | | | | | | | | |

== 2012 Ladder ==
| North Eastern FU | Wins | Byes | Losses | Draws | For | Against | % | Pts | Final | Team | G | B | Pts | Team | G | B | Pts |
|---|---|---|---|---|---|---|---|---|---|---|---|---|---|---|---|---|---|
| Winnaleah | 14 | 0 | 2 | 0 | 1444 | 864 | 167.13% | 56 | 1st Semi | Bridport | 7 | 16 | 58 | St Helens | 4 | 12 | 36 |
| Branxholm | 10 | 0 | 6 | 0 | 1299 | 1184 | 109.71% | 40 | 2nd Semi | Winnaleah | 15 | 12 | 102 | Branxholm | 5 | 9 | 39 |
| Bridport | 7 | 0 | 9 | 0 | 1113 | 1158 | 96.11% | 28 | Preliminary | Bridport | 14 | 7 | 91 | Branxholm | 8 | 7 | 55 |
| St Helens | 5 | 0 | 11 | 0 | 1063 | 1383 | 76.86% | 20 | Grand | Winnaleah | 16 | 10 | 106 | Bridport | 9 | 6 | 60 |
| Scottsdale Crows | 4 | 0 | 12 | 0 | 969 | 1299 | 74.60% | 16 | | | | | | | | | |

== 2013 Ladder ==
| North Eastern FU | Wins | Byes | Losses | Draws | For | Against | % | Pts | Final | Team | G | B | Pts | Team | G | B | Pts |
|---|---|---|---|---|---|---|---|---|---|---|---|---|---|---|---|---|---|
| Bridport | 12 | 0 | 4 | 0 | 1472 | 1160 | 126.90% | 48 | 1st Semi | Branxholm | 9 | 8 | 62 | East Coast Swans | 7 | 9 | 51 |
| Winnaleah | 11 | 0 | 5 | 0 | 1286 | 977 | 131.63% | 44 | 2nd Semi | Bridport | 11 | 13 | 79 | Winnaleah | 10 | 9 | 69 |
| Branxholm | 9 | 0 | 7 | 0 | 1445 | 1261 | 114.59% | 36 | Preliminary | Winnaleah | 7 | 7 | 49 | Branxholm | 6 | 7 | 43 |
| East Coast | 8 | 0 | 8 | 0 | 1671 | 1092 | 153.02% | 32 | Grand | Bridport | 8 | 12 | 60 | Winnaleah | 7 | 11 | 53 |
| Scottsdale Crows | 0 | 0 | 16 | 0 | 582 | 1966 | 29.60% | 0 | | | | | | | | | |

== 2014 Ladder ==
| North Eastern FU | Wins | Byes | Losses | Draws | For | Against | % | Pts | Final | Team | G | B | Pts | Team | G | B | Pts |
|---|---|---|---|---|---|---|---|---|---|---|---|---|---|---|---|---|---|
| Branxholm | 14 | 4 | 2 | 0 | 1791 | 724 | 247.38% | 56 | 1st Semi | Winnaleah | 10 | 16 | 76 | Bridport | 3 | 6 | 24 |
| East Coast | 12 | 4 | 4 | 0 | 1546 | 962 | 160.71% | 48 | 2nd Semi | Branxholm | 14 | 7 | 91 | East Coast Swans | 10 | 8 | 68 |
| Bridport | 6 | 4 | 9 | 1 | 971 | 1412 | 68.77% | 26 | Preliminary | East Coast Swans | 12 | 9 | 81 | Winnaleah | 9 | 13 | 67 |
| Winnaleah | 5 | 4 | 10 | 1 | 1072 | 1470 | 72.93% | 22 | Grand | Branxholm | 9 | 15 | 69 | East Coast Swans | 6 | 12 | 48 |
| Scottsdale Crows | 2 | 4 | 14 | 0 | 794 | 1606 | 49.44% | 8 | | | | | | | | | |

== 2015 Ladder ==
| North Eastern FU | Wins | Byes | Losses | Draws | For | Against | % | Pts | Final | Team | G | B | Pts | Team | G | B | Pts |
|---|---|---|---|---|---|---|---|---|---|---|---|---|---|---|---|---|---|
| Bridport | 15 | 0 | 1 | 0 | 2101 | 741 | 283.54% | 60 | 1st Semi | Scottsdale Crows | 11 | 14 | 80 | Winnaleah | 9 | 6 | 60 |
| East Coast | 12 | 0 | 4 | 0 | 1774 | 955 | 185.76% | 48 | 2nd Semi | Bridport | 12 | 14 | 86 | East Coast Swans | 6 | 11 | 47 |
| Scottsdale Crows | 6 | 0 | 10 | 1 | 946 | 1678 | 56.38% | 26 | Preliminary | East Coast Swans | 9 | 15 | 69 | Scottsdale Crows | 6 | 7 | 43 |
| Winnaleah | 1 | 0 | 15 | 1 | 699 | 1819 | 38.43% | 6 | Grand | Bridport | 12 | 13 | 85 | East Coast Swans | 7 | 9 | 51 |
| Branxholm | 0 | 0 | 4 | 0 | 72 | 399 | 18.05% | 0 | | | | | | | | | |

== 2016 Ladder ==
| North Eastern FU | Wins | Byes | Losses | Draws | For | Against | % | Pts | Final | Team | G | B | Pts | Team | G | B | Pts |
|---|---|---|---|---|---|---|---|---|---|---|---|---|---|---|---|---|---|
| Bridport | 12 | 0 | 2 | 0 | 1535 | 798 | 192.36% | 48 | 1st Semi | East Coast Swans | 14 | 5 | 89 | Scottsdale Crows | 9 | 10 | 64 |
| Winnaleah | 11 | 0 | 3 | 0 | 1279 | 735 | 174.01% | 44 | 2nd Semi | Bridport | 13 | 6 | 84 | Winnaleah | 8 | 10 | 58 |
| East Coast | 5 | 0 | 9 | 0 | 859 | 1145 | 75.02% | 20 | Preliminary | Winnaleah | 11 | 14 | 80 | East Coast Swans | 4 | 0 | 24 |
| Scottsdale Crows | 0 | 0 | 14 | 0 | 761 | 1756 | 43.34% | 0 | Grand | Winnaleah | 9 | 11 | 65 | Bridport | 6 | 12 | 48 |

== 2017 Ladder ==
| North Eastern FU | Wins | Byes | Losses | Draws | For | Against | % | Pts | Final | Team | G | B | Pts | Team | G | B | Pts |
|---|---|---|---|---|---|---|---|---|---|---|---|---|---|---|---|---|---|
| Winnaleah | 12 | 0 | 0 | 0 | 1819 | 325 | 559.69% | 48 | Grand | Winnaleah | 24 | 21 | 165 | Scottsdale Crows | 3 | 2 | 20 |
| Scottsdale Crows | 0 | 0 | 12 | 0 | 325 | 1819 | 17.87% | 0 | | | | | | | | | |

== Premiers ==
North East Coast FA

- 1907 Derby

North Eastern FA

- 1908 Pioneer
- 1909 Derby
- 1910-11 NEFA in recess
- 1912 Derby
- 1913 Derby City
- 1914 Derby City
- 1915-21 NEFA in recess
- 1922 Ringarooma
- 1923 Ringaroona
- 1924 Legerwood

NEFU

- 1925 Wanderers
- 1926 Scottsdale
- 1927 Scottsdale
- 1928 Scottsdale
- 1929 Wanderers

NEFA

- 1930 Ringarooma
- 1931 Ringarooma
- 1932 Winnaleah
- 1933 Alberton
- 1934 Branxholm
- 1935 Alberton
- 1936 Derby

NEFU

- 1937 Alberton
- 1938 Wanderers
- 1939 Scottsdale
- 1940 Winnaleah
- 1941-1944 WWII
- 1945 Winnaleah
- 1946 Scottsdale
- 1947 Scottsdale
- 1948 Wanderers
- 1949 Derby
- 1950 Derby
- 1951 Branxholm
- 1952 Legerwood
- 1953 Derby
- 1954 Derby
- 1955 Ringarooma
- 1956 Branxholm
- 1957 Derby
- 1958 Branxholm
- 1959 Branxholm
- 1960 Derby
- 1961 Branxholm
- 1962 Branxholm
- 1963 Branxholm
- 1964 Branxholm
- 1965 Winnaleah
- 1966 Branxholm
- 1967 Pioneer
- 1968 Ringarooma
- 1969 Ringarooma
- 1970 Branxholm
- 1971 Ringarooma
- 1972 Winnaleah
- 1973 Bridport
- 1974 Winnaleah
- 1975 Ringarooma
- 1976 Pioneer
- 1977 Pioneer
- 1978 Pioneer
- 1979 Branxholm
- 1980 Ringarooma
- 1981 Ringarooma
- 1982 Bridport
- 1983 Ringarooma
- 1984 Ringarooma
- 1985 Winnaleah
- 1986 Lilydale
- 1987 Branxholm
- 1988 Lilydale
- 1989 Scottsdale Crows
- 1990 Scottsdale Crows
- 1991 Ringarooma
- 1992 Lilydale
- 1993 Bridport
- 1994 Lilydale
- 1995 Branxholm
- 1996 Branxholm
- 1997 St. Helens
- 1998 Fingal
- 1999 Bridport
- 2000 St. Helens
- 2001 Bridport
- 2002 Bridport
- 2003 Winnaleah
- 2004 Winnaleah
- 2005 Winnaleah
- 2006 Scottsdale Crows
- 2007 Lilydale
- 2008 Ringarooma
- 2009 Lilydale
- 2010 Lilydale
- 2011 Winnaleah
- 2012 Winnaleah
- 2013 Bridport
- 2014 Branxholm
- 2015 Bridport
- 2016 Winnaleah
- 2017 Winnaleah

== Published books ==
- Australian rules football in Tasmania, John Stoward, 2002, ISBN 0-9577515-7-5
- More on football, B.T. (Buck) Anderton. , Central Coast Courier, 2002, ISBN 0-9581306-0-4
