= Legerwood, Tasmania =

Legerwood
- Town
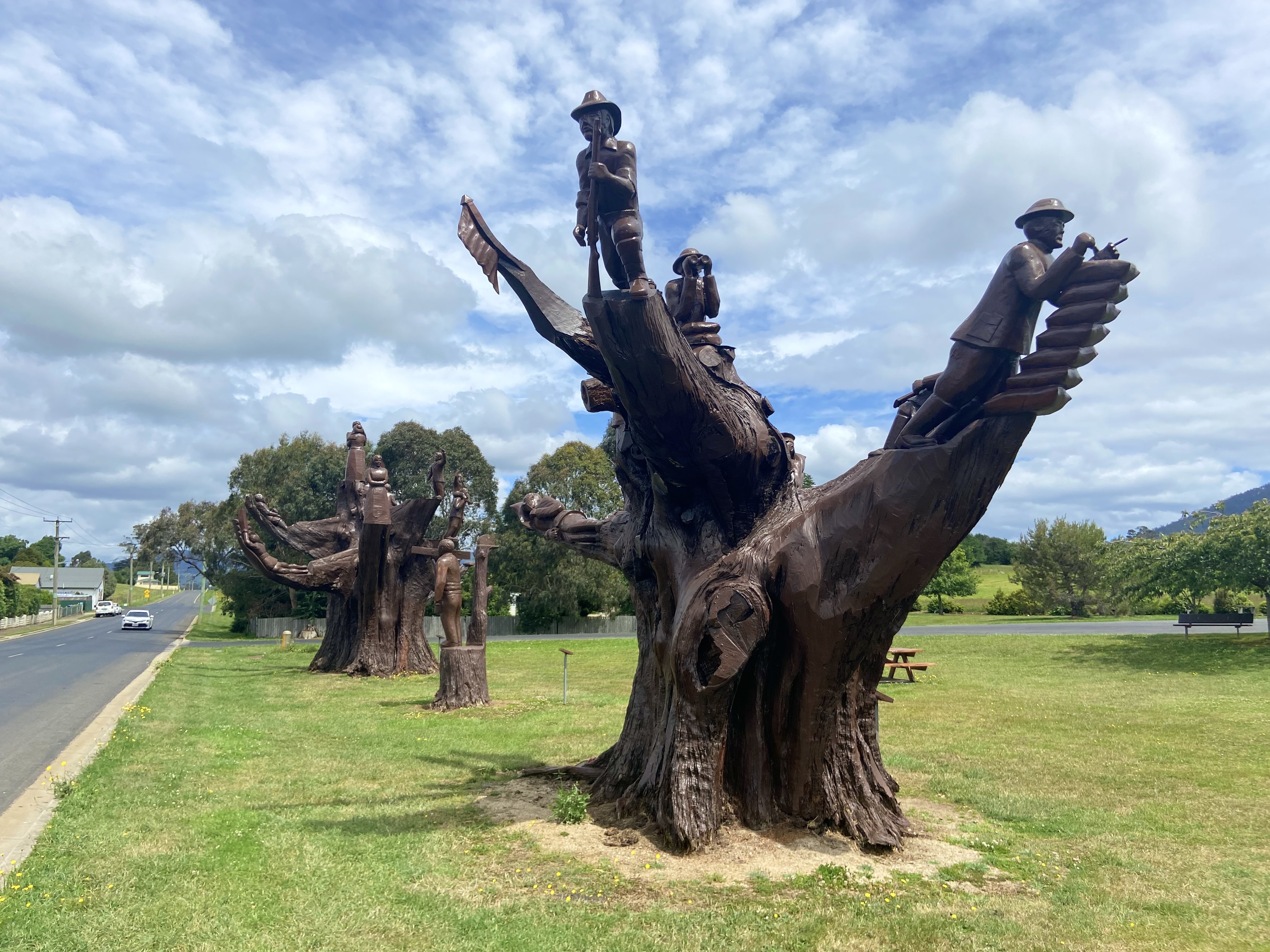
- Legerwood Carved Memorial Trees

- Coordinates: 41°12′50″S 147°41′56″E
- Country: Australia
- State: Tasmania
- Region: North-east
- LGA: Dorset
- Location: 24 km (15 mi) SE of Scottsdale

Government
  - State electorate: Bass
  - Federal division: Bass

Population
  - Total: 204 (2021 census)
- Postcode: 7263
Localities around Legerwood
Tulendeena	Branxholm	Branxholm
Cuckoo, Ringarooma	Legerwood	Ringarooma, Branxholm
Ringarooma	Ringarooma	Ringarooma

Legerwood (/ˈlɛdʒəwʊd/ LEJ-ə-wood) is a rural locality and town in the local government area of Dorset in the North-east region of Tasmania, the island State of Australia. It is located about 24 kilometres (15 mi) south-east of the town of Scottsdale. The 2021 census determined a population of 204 for the state suburb of Legerwood.

== History ==
The greater Legerwood area was inhabited by the indigenous North East nation for over 10,000 years prior to the British colonisation of Tasmania.

Legerwood was the name given to a property selected in the area in 1855 by settler James Scott and his nephew James Reid Scott. It was named for Legerwood, in the Scottish Borders council area of Scotland, after James Scott's ancestral homeland. The established village was originally called Ringarooma Road but changed to Legerwood in about 1890. In 1903 the "Legerwood" estate was subdivided in Launceston by Messrs. W. T. Bell and Co. Thirty-eight allotments went to auction, containing between 7.3–59.5 hectares (18–147 acres) each. The Legerwood area grew in timber, sawmills, dairy and pastoral industries and was gazetted as a locality in 1939. Scott's descendants continued to live in the township until at least the mid-1950s.

== Legerwood Carved Memorial Trees ==
On 15 October 1918, twenty-five trees were planted along the Railway Reserve at Ringarooma Road in memoriam of the village's fallen soldiers following the end of the Great War. A ceremony was held where a relative of the deceased would come forward to hold a Turkish pine (Pinus brutia) sapling before it was planted.

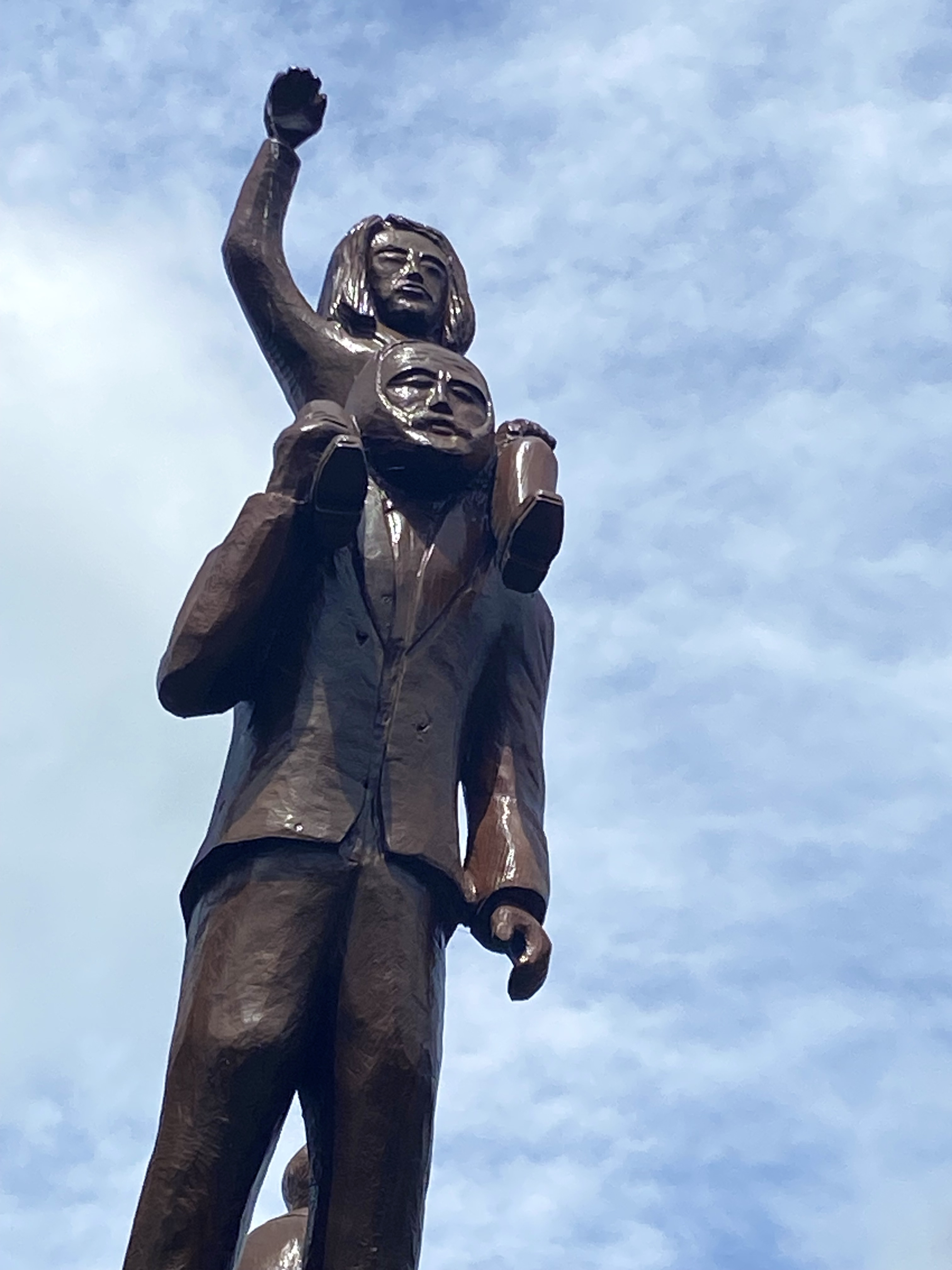
Characters from Caring Husband Till the End

In 1999 the trees were deemed unsafe from blight and Dorset Council recommended they be cut down. Determined to retain the memorial, in 2004 the Legerwood Hall and Reserves Committee commissioned chainsaw sculptor Eddie Freeman to carve a series of sculptures on the dying trunks based on the lives of the people they represented in remembrance. Extensive historical research into the lives of the fallen soldiers and their families ensured the carvings depicted stories of the men they represented as accurately as possible. Surrounding trees affected from blight were sculpted to depict scenes of the Great War. Weymouth Pines (Pinus strobus) survive at either end of Railway Reserve and represent Gallipoli, the Landing at Anzac Cove and ANZAC soldiers who fought during this time. The carvings have become a popular picnicking destination for tourists venturing between the townships of Scottsdale, Derby and Ringarooma.

On 10 April 2018, deteriorating carvings of several characters (Mr and Mrs Thomas Edwards, the nurse, and Trippy Forsyth) were replaced with new carvings by Jason Chard of Tasmanian Burl and Steve Morris of Mobile Milling Tasmania.

== North East Rail Trail ==
A 100 km mountain biking path along the former North East Rail corridor was announced in 2016. The former rail corridor commenced at Launceston and travelled through the townships of Lilydale, Wyena, Tonganah and Legerwood before ending at Derby. In 2022, a decision on the fate of the former rail corridor remained undecided by the Infrastructure Minister.

== Blockchain Mining ==
In 2022, the former 1950s butter factory at Legerwood was purchased for $1.6 million by Sydney-based Alibaba Agriculture and the data processing start-up Grasschain, who re-configured the site for blockchain mining. The location was chosen as a means to generate "green" cryptocurrency following Tasmania's achievement in becoming 100 per cent self-sufficient in renewable energy in 2020.

== Geography ==
The Ringarooma River forms the north-eastern boundary.

== Road infrastructure ==
Route C423 (Carisbrook Lane / Main Street / Ringarooma Road) starts at an intersection with A3 and runs south to the town and then south-east before exiting. Route C424 (Legerwood Lane) starts at an intersection with A3 on the north-east boundary and runs south, intersecting with C423 on the south-east boundary.
