= Kamona, Tasmania =

Kamona
- Town
- Coordinates: 41°8′52″S 147°38′58″E
- Country: Australia
- State: Tasmania
- Region: North-east
- LGA: Dorset Council
- Location: 16 km (9.9 mi) E of Scottsdale

Government
  - State electorate: Bass
  - Federal division: Bass

Population
  - Total: 11 (2016 census)
- Postcode: 7260
Localities around Kamona
Forester	Forester	Forester
North Scottsdale, Tonganah	Kamona	Branxholm, Warrentinna
Tonganah	Tulendeena	Legerwood

Kamona is a rural locality in the local government area (LGA) of Dorset in the North-east LGA region of Tasmania. The locality is about 16 kilometres (9.9 mi) east of the town of Scottsdale. The 2016 census recorded a population of 11 for the state suburb of Kamona.

== History ==
Kamona was gazetted as a locality in 1969. The name "Kamona Moina" was given to a parish in the district in 1880. It is believed that "Kamona" is part of the Aboriginal words for "venom".

The locality has been used for mining and timber production.

== Geography ==
The Arnon River forms most of the western boundary.

== Road infrastructure ==
Route A3 (Tasman Highway) passes to the south, and Kamona Valley Road provides access to the locality. Route C834 (Forester Road) passes to the north, and Arnon Road also accesses the locality.
