= Telita, Tasmania =

Telita Tasmania
- Coordinates: 41°07′58″S 147°45′54″E
- Population: 22 (2016 census)
- Postcode(s): 7264
- Location: 33 km (21 mi) E of Scottsdale
- LGA(s): Dorset
- Region: North-east
- State electorate(s): Bass
- Federal division(s): Bass
Localities around Telita:
Warrentinna	Warrentinna, Derby	Derby
Warrentinna	Telita	Derby
Branxholm	Branxholm	Derby

Telita is a rural locality in the local government area (LGA) of Dorset in the North-east LGA region of Tasmania. The locality is about 33 kilometres (21 mi) east of the town of Scottsdale. The 2016 census recorded a population of 22 for the state suburb of Telita.

== History ==
Telita was gazetted as a locality in 1969. The name is believed to be an Aboriginal word for "to chirrup".

First named “Ayr”, it was changed to Telita about 1923.

== Geography ==
The Ringarooma River forms most of the southern boundary.

== Road infrastructure ==
Route A3 (Tasman Highway) passes to the south-east. Derby Back Road and Telita Road provide access to the locality.
