= Arthur Triffitt =

Australian cricketer

Personal information
- Born: 17 March 1914; Branxholm, Tasmania, Australia
- Died: 12 March 1973 (aged 58); Cuckoo, Tasmania, Australia

Domestic team information
- Years: Team
- 1950–1951: Tasmania
- Source: Cricinfo, 9 March 2016

Arthur Triffitt (17 March 1914 – 12 March 1973) was an Australian cricketer. He played one first-class match for Tasmania in 1950/51. He also played for Sandy Bay and South Melbourne Cricket Club.

== See also ==
- List of Tasmanian representative cricketers
