= North Lilydale, Tasmania =

North Lilydale Tasmania
- Coordinates: 41°13′37″S 147°14′53″E
- Population: 82 (2016 census)
- Postcode(s): 7268
- Location: 33 km (21 mi) W of Scottsdale
- LGA(s): Dorset, Launceston
- Region: North-east, Launceston
- State electorate(s): Bass
- Federal division(s): Bass
Localities around North Lilydale:
| Lebrina | Wyena | Wyena |
| Lilydale | North Lilydale | Wyena, Lisle |
| Lilydale | Lilydale | Lisle |

North Lilydale is a rural locality in the local government areas (LGA) of Dorset and Launceston in the North-east and Launceston LGA regions of Tasmania. The locality is about 33 kilometres (21 mi) west of the town of Scottsdale. The 2016 census recorded a population of 82 for the state suburb of North Lilydale.

== History ==
The locality was gazetted as “Lilydale North” in 1964. It was re-gazetted to its present name in 1971.

== Geography ==
The boundaries consist primarily of survey lines and ridge lines.

== Road infrastructure ==
Route B81 (Golconda Road) passes to the west of the locality. From there North Lilydale Road provides access.
