= Winnaleah =

Winnaleah Tasmania
- Coordinates: 41°05′S 147°49′E
- Population: 225 (2016 census)
- Postcode(s): 7265
- Location: 30 km (19 mi) from Gladstone; 38 km (24 mi) NE of Scottsdale; 61 km (38 mi) from St Helens; 97 km (60 mi) from Launceston
- LGA(s): Dorset Council
- Region: North-east
- State electorate(s): Bass
- Federal division(s): Bass
Localities around Winnaleah:
Banca	Banca	South Mount Cameron
Forester	Winnaleah	Herrick
Warrentinna	Moorina, Derby	Moorina

Winnaleah is a rural / residential locality in the local government area (LGA) of Dorset in the North-east LGA region of Tasmania. The locality is about 38 kilometres (24 mi) north-east of the town of Scottsdale. The 2016 census recorded a population of 225 for the state suburb of Winnaleah.

It is a town in the north-east of Tasmania. Local attractions include a swimming pool (run by the local community), a post office, hotel, produce store, district high school (prep to grade 10), church, community shop and a memorial ANZAC bell.

== History ==
Winnaleah was gazetted as a locality in 1969. The name is believed to be an Aboriginal word meaning fire.

The Winnaleah Post Office opened on 1 October 1912.

Winnaleah Hotel was built and opened in 1927 by William Whitmore.

Mr Whitmore transferred the licence held by him at the Esplanade Hotel, Moorina on 25 November 1927, to his new hotel.

== Geography ==
Most of the boundaries are survey lines.

== Road infrastructure ==
Route A3 (Tasman Highway) passes through the south-east corner. From there, Winnaleah Road runs to the village.
