= Blumont, Tasmania =

Blumont
- Town
- Coordinates: 41°08′39″S 147°24′40″E
- Country: Australia
- State: Tasmania
- Region: North-east
- LGA: Dorset
- Location: 13 km (8.1 mi) W of Scottsdale

Government
  - State electorate: Bass
  - Federal division: Bass

Population
  - Total: 31 (2016 census)
- Postcode: 7260
Localities around Blumont
Bridport	Jetsonville	Jetsonville
Nabowla	Blumont	Lietinna, Jetsonville
Nabowla	Nabowla	West Scottsdale

Blumont is a rural locality in the local government area (LGA) of Dorset in the North-east LGA region of Tasmania. The locality is about 13 kilometres (8.1 mi) west of the town of Scottsdale. The 2016 census recorded a population of 31 for the state suburb of Blumont.

== History ==
Blumont was gazetted as a locality in 1964.

The former North-East Railway opened from Launceston to Scottsdale in 1899, with a station at Blumont. This station was used to load timber harvested in the locality.

== Geography ==
The Brid River forms the north-eastern boundary.

== Road infrastructure ==
Route B81 (Golconda Road) passes through from south-west to east.
