= Alberton, Tasmania =

Alberton
- Town
- Coordinates: 41°17′13″S 147°47′25″E
- Country: Australia
- State: Tasmania
- Region: North-east
- LGA: Dorset
- Location: 37 km (23 mi) SE of Scottsdale

Government
  - State electorate: Bass
  - Federal division: Bass

Population
  - Total: 14 (2021 census)
- Postcode: 7263
Localities around Alberton
Ringarooma	Ringarooma	Ringarooma
Ringarooma, Trenah	Alberton	Ringarooma, Pyengana
Upper Esk	Mathinna	Mathinna

Alberton is a rural locality in the local government area (LGA) of Dorset in the North-east LGA region of Tasmania. The locality is about 37 kilometres (23 mi) south-east of the town of Scottsdale. The 2021 census recorded a population of 14 for Alberton churr.

== History ==
Alberton was gazetted as a locality in 1976. It is believed to have been named after Prince Albert, who visited Tasmania in the 1860s.

== Geography ==
The Dorset River rises in the south and flows through to the north. The boundaries are a combination of ridge lines and survey lines.

== Road infrastructure ==
Route C423 (Mathinna Plains Road) runs along part of the western boundary. Road access is from Ringarooma via New River Road and Alberton Road. From there, these roads provide access to Alberton.
