= Lietinna, Tasmania =

Lietinna
- Town
- Coordinates: 41°09′30″S 147°27′45″E
- Country: Australia
- State: Tasmania
- Region: North-east
- LGA: Dorset
- Location: 7 km (4.3 mi) W of Scottsdale

Government
  - State electorate: Bass
  - Federal division: Bass

Population
  - Total: 58 (2016 census)
- Postcode: 7260
Localities around Lietinna
Jetsonville	Jetsonville	Jetsonville
Blumont	Lietinna	Scottsdale
West Scottsdale	West Scottsdale	Scottsdale

Lietinna is a rural locality in the local government area (LGA) of Dorset in the North-east LGA region of Tasmania. The locality is about 7 kilometres (4.3 mi) west of the town of Scottsdale. The 2016 census recorded a population of 58 for the state suburb of Lietinna.

== History ==
Lietinna was gazetted as a locality in 1964. It is believed that the name is an Aboriginal word of undetermined meaning. The former North East Railway line passed through from west to east.

== Geography ==
The Brid River forms part of the eastern boundary.

== Road infrastructure ==
Route B81 (Golconda Road) passes through from west to east.
