= South Mount Cameron, Tasmania =

South Mount Cameron Tasmania
- Coordinates: 41°00′53″S 147°57′49″E
- Population: 15 (2016 census)
- Postcode(s): 7264
- Location: 59 km (37 mi) NE of Scottsdale
- LGA(s): Dorset
- Region: North-east
- State electorate(s): Bass
- Federal division(s): Bass
Localities around South Mount Cameron:
Boobyalla	Gladstone	Gladstone
Banca	South Mount Cameron	Gladstone
Winnaleah	Pioneer	Gladstone

South Mount Cameron is a rural locality in the local government area (LGA) of Dorset in the North-east LGA region of Tasmania. The locality is about 59 kilometres (37 mi) north-east of the town of Scottsdale. The 2016 census recorded a population of 15 for the state suburb of South Mount Cameron.

== History ==
South Mount Cameron was gazetted as a locality in 1969.

The area was originally settled as a tin-mining town.

== Geography ==
The Ringarooma River flows through from south to north-east.

== Road infrastructure ==
Route B82 (Gladstone Road) passes through from south to north-east.
