= Talawa =

- Town
- Coordinates: 41°16′56″S 147°42′36″E
- Country: Australia
- State: Tasmania
- Region: North-east
- LGA: Dorset
- Location: 36 km (22 mi) SE of Scottsdale

Government
  - State electorate: Bass
  - Federal division: Bass

Population
  - Total: 53 (2016 census)
- Postcode: 7263
Localities around Talawa
Ringarooma	Ringarooma	Ringarooma
Ringarooma	Talawa	Ringarooma
Trenah	Trenah	Ringarooma

Talawa is a rural locality in the local government area of Dorset in the North-east region of Tasmania. It is located about 36 kilometres (22 mi) south-east of the town of Scottsdale. The 2016 census determined a population of 53 for the state suburb of Talawa.

== History ==
Talawa is a confirmed suburb/locality. The name is an Aboriginal word meaning rain.

== Geography ==
The Ringarooma River passes through from south to north.

== Road infrastructure ==
The C423 route (Mathinna Plains Road) follows the eastern boundary for a short distance. Route C426 (Barnett Street / East Maurice Road / Cottons Bridge Road) starts at an intersection with C423 and runs west across the locality before exiting to the north-west. Route C427 (a continuation of East Maurice Road) starts at an intersection with C426 and runs north before exiting.
