= Tulendeena, Tasmania =

Tulendeena Tasmania
- Coordinates: 41°11′09″S 147°39′52″E
- Population: 12 (2016 census)
- Postcode(s): 7260
- Location: 17 km (11 mi) E of Scottsdale
- LGA(s): Dorset
- Region: North-east
- State electorate(s): Bass
- Federal division(s): Bass
Localities around Tulendeena:
| Tonganah | Kamona | Kamona |
| Cuckoo, Tonganah | Tulendeena | Kamona, Legerwood |
| Legerwood | Legerwood | Legerwood |

Tulendeena is a rural locality in the local government area (LGA) of Dorset in the North-east LGA region of Tasmania in Australia. The locality is about 17 kilometres (11 mi) east of the town of Scottsdale. The 2016 census recorded a population of 12 for the state suburb of Tulendeena.

== History ==
Tulendeena was gazetted as a locality in 1967. The name is believed to be an Aboriginal word for “top”. The name was in use by 1917.

== Geography ==
The boundaries consist primarily of survey lines and ridge lines.

== Road infrastructure ==
Route A3 (Tasman Highway) passes through from north-west to south-east.
