= Upper Esk, Tasmania =

Upper Esk
- Town
- Coordinates: 41°26′21″S 147°43′18″E
- Country: Australia
- State: Tasmania
- Region: North-east
- LGA: Break O'Day, Dorset
- Location: 68 km (42 mi) SE of Scottsdale

Government
  - State electorate: Lyons, Bass
  - Federal division: Lyons, Bass

Population
  - Total: 25 (SAL 2021)
- Postcode: 7214
Localities around Upper Esk
Trenah	Alberton, Trenah	Alberton
Upper Blessington	Upper Esk	Mathinna
Ben Lomond	Ben Lomond	Mathinna

Upper Esk is a rural locality in the local government areas (LGA) of Break O'Day and Dorset in the North-east LGA region of Tasmania. The locality is about 68 kilometres (42 mi) southeast of the town of Scottsdale.

== History ==
Upper Esk was gazetted as a locality in 1976.

The name was changed from Cloverdale in 1948.

The 2016 census recorded a population of 26 for the state suburb of Upper Esk. At the 2021 census, the population had dropped to 25.

== Geography ==
The South Esk River rises in the north of the locality and flows through to the east.

== Road infrastructure ==
Route C401 (Upper Esk Road / Gunns Road) passes through from east to west before forming part of the western boundary. Route C423 (Mathinna Plains Road) runs along part of the eastern boundary.
