= Lebrina, Tasmania =

Lebrina Tasmania
- Coordinates: 41°09′52″S 147°13′51″E
- Population: 221 (SAL 2021)
- Postcode(s): 7254
- Location: 38 km (24 mi) NE of Launceston
- LGA(s): Launceston
- Region: Northern Tasmania
- State electorate(s): Bass
- Federal division(s): Bass
Localities around Lebrina:
Retreat	Pipers Brook	Golconda
Retreat	Lebrina	Wyena
Tunnel	Lilydale	North Lilydale

Lebrina is a rural locality and town in the local government area of Launceston, in the Northern region of Tasmania. It is located about 38 kilometres (24 mi) north-east of the city of Launceston.

== History ==
Lebrina is an Aboriginal word for “house” or “hut”. The locality was gazetted in 1964.

The 2016 census determined a population of 192 for the state suburb of Lebrina.

== Geography ==
The Denison River flows through the south-east corner. Pipers Brook rises in the south-west and flows through to the north-west.

== Road infrastructure ==
The B81 route (Golconda Road) enters from the south and runs to the centre before exiting to the east. Route C818 (Pipers Brook Road) starts at an intersection with B81 in the centre and runs to the north-west before exiting. Route C819 (Hextalls Road) starts at an intersection with B81 and exits to the west. Route C820 (Tunnel Road) starts at an intersection with B81 in the south and exits to the west.
