= Waterhouse, Tasmania =

Waterhouse Tasmania
- Coordinates: 40°57′27″S 147°34′45″E
- Population: 100 (SAL 2021)
- Postcode(s): 7262
- Location: 39 km (24 mi) NE of Scottsdale
- LGA(s): Dorset
- Region: North-east
- State electorate(s): Bass
- Federal division(s): Bass
Localities around Waterhouse:
Bass Strait	Bass Strait	Bass Strait
Bass Strait	Waterhouse	Tomahawk
Bridport	Forester	Banca

Waterhouse is a rural locality in the local government area of Dorset in the North-east region of Tasmania. It is located about 39 kilometres (24 mi) north-east of the town of Scottsdale.

== History ==
Waterhouse was gazetted as a locality in 1959.

== Etymology ==
The locality is believed to have been named Waterhouse due to its proximity to Waterhouse Island, which was named after Captain Henry Waterhouse of the Reliance by Captain Matthew Flinders.

== Geography ==
Bass Strait forms the western and part of the northern boundaries. The Great Forester River forms part of the southern boundary.

== Road infrastructure ==
The B82 route (Waterhouse Road) enters from the south-west and runs north-east and east before exiting in the north-east. Route C832 (Old Waterhouse Road) starts at an intersection with B82 and runs south before exiting.
