= North Scottsdale =

- Town
- Coordinates: 41°08′16″S 147°32′24″E
- Country: Australia
- State: Tasmania
- Region: North-east
- LGA: Dorset
- Location: 4.6 km (2.9 mi) NE of Scottsdale

Government
  - State electorate: Bass
  - Federal division: Bass

Population
  - Total: 122 (2016 census)
- Postcode: 7260
Localities around North Scottsdale
| Bridport | Bridport | Forester |
| Jetsonville | North Scottsdale | Forester, Kamona |
| Scottsdale | Scottsdale, Tonganah | Kamona |

North Scottsdale is a rural locality in the local government area of Dorset in the North-east region of Tasmania. It is located about 4.6 kilometres (2.9 mi) north-east of the town of Scottsdale. The 2016 census determined a population of 122 for the state suburb of North Scottsdale.

== History ==
North Scottsdale was previously known as Bungana. The locality was gazetted in 1956.

== Geography ==
The Arnon River and Great Forester River each form part of the eastern boundary.

== Road infrastructure ==
The C831 route (Burnside Road / North Scottsdale Road / Jensen's Road) enters from the south-west and runs north-east and south-east before exiting. Route C832 (North Scottsdale Road / Old Waterhouse Road) enters in the south-west and runs through to the north-east before exiting. Route C834 (Forester Road) starts at an intersection with C832 and runs east before exiting.
