= Musselroe Bay, Tasmania =

Musselroe Bay
- Town
- Coordinates: 40°50′26″S 148°10′26″E
- Country: Australia
- State: Tasmania
- Region: North-east
- LGA: Dorset
- Location: 91 km (57 mi) NE of Scottsdale

Government
  - State electorate: Bass
  - Federal division: Bass

Population
  - Total: 40 (2016 census)
- Postcode: 7264
Localities around Musselroe Bay
Cape Portland	Banks Strait	Banks Strait
Rushy Lagoon	Musselroe Bay	Mount William
Rushy Lagoon, Gladstone	Gladstone	Mount William, Gladstone

Musselroe Bay is a rural locality and body of water in the local government area of Dorset in the North-east region of Tasmania. It is located about 91 kilometres (57 mi) north-east of the town of Scottsdale. The 2016 census determined a population of 40 for the state suburb of Musselroe Bay.

== History ==
The locality was gazetted as Poole in 1968, and changed to Musselroe Bay in 2001.

== Geography ==
Banks Strait forms the northern boundary, and the Great Musselroe River is the western boundary. Musselroe Bay (the body of water) is an inlet of Great Musselroe Bay, which is an inlet of Banks Strait, a channel at the eastern end of Bass Strait.

== Road infrastructure ==
The C845 route (Musselroe Road) enters from the south-west and runs through to the north-east.
