= Banca, Tasmania =

Banca Tasmania
- Coordinates: 41°01′58″S 147°45′45″E
- Population: nil (2016 census)
- Postcode(s): 7265
- Location: 35 km (22 mi) NE of Scottsdale
- LGA(s): Dorset
- Region: North-east
- State electorate(s): Bass
- Federal division(s): Bass
Localities around Banca:
Waterhouse	Boobyalla	Gladstone
Waterhouse	Banca	South Mount Cameron
Forester	Winnaleah, Forester	Pioneer

Banca is a rural locality in the local government area (LGA) of Dorset in the North-east LGA region of Tasmania. The locality is about 35 kilometres (22 mi) north-east of the town of Scottsdale. The 2016 census recorded a population of nil for the state suburb of Banca.

== History ==
The locality was gazetted as “The Banca” in 1969, and re-gazetted as Banca in 1985. It was originally the site of a tin mine.

== Geography ==
The Boobyalla River forms part of the southern boundary and then flows through from south to north. The Tomahawk River forms part of the western boundary. The eastern boundary loosely follows the Little Boobyalla River.

== Road infrastructure ==
Route C840 (Banca Road) passes through from south to north.
