= Rushy Lagoon =

- Town
- Coordinates: 40°51′26″S 148°00′39″E
- Country: Australia
- State: Tasmania
- Region: North-east
- LGA: Dorset
- Location: 81 km (50 mi) NE of Scottsdale

Government
  - State electorate: Bass
  - Federal division: Bass

Population
  - Total: 30 (2016 census)
- Postcode: 7264
Localities around Rushy Lagoon
Bass Strait	Cape Portland	Musselroe Bay
Bass Strait	Rushy Lagoon	Musselroe Bay
Boobyalla	Gladstone	Gladstone

Rushy Lagoon is a rural locality in the local government area (LGA) of Dorset in the North-east LGA region of Tasmania. The locality is about 81 kilometres (50 mi) north-east of the town of Scottsdale. The 2016 census recorded a population of 30 for the state suburb of Rushy Lagoon.

== History ==
Rushy Lagoon was gazetted as a locality in 1968. New Zealand farmer Allan Pye bought the Rushy Lagoon farm in 1997. Pye expanded it to include nearby properties and made it the largest farm in Tasmania, with 4000 dairy cows, 8000 beef cattle and 7000 sheep as of 2018. Pye put the farm up for sale for $70 million in 2018, although it did not sell.

== Geography ==
The waters of Ringarooma Bay, an inlet of Bass Strait, form most of the western boundary. The Ringarooma River forms the south-western boundary. The Great Musselroe River forms much of the eastern boundary.

== Road infrastructure ==
Route C844 (Cape Portland Road) passes through from south to north.
