= Forester, Tasmania =

Forester
- Town
- Coordinates: 41°05′47″S 147°41′18″E
- Country: Australia
- State: Tasmania
- Region: North-east
- LGA: Dorset
- Location: 21 km (13 mi) NE of Scottsdale

Government
  - State electorate: Bass
  - Federal division: Bass

Population
  - Total: 8 (2016 census)
- Postcode: 7260
Localities around Forester
Waterhouse	Banca, Waterhouse	Banca
North Scottsdale	Forester	Warrentinna
North Scottsdale	Kamona	Warrentinna

Forester is a rural locality in the local government area (LGA) of Dorset in the North-east LGA region of Tasmania. The locality is about 21 kilometres (13 mi) north-east of the town of Scottsdale. The 2016 census recorded a population of 8 for the state suburb of Forester.

== History ==
Forester was gazetted as a locality in 1969.

The locality is a logging area.

== Geography ==
The Great Forester River forms a small part of the western boundary. The Tomahawk River rises in the locality and flows through to the north.

== Road infrastructure ==
Route C834 (Forester Road) passes through from south-west to south-east. Route C832 (Waterhouse Road) runs along part of the western boundary.
