= Pioneer, Tasmania =

Pioneer
- Town
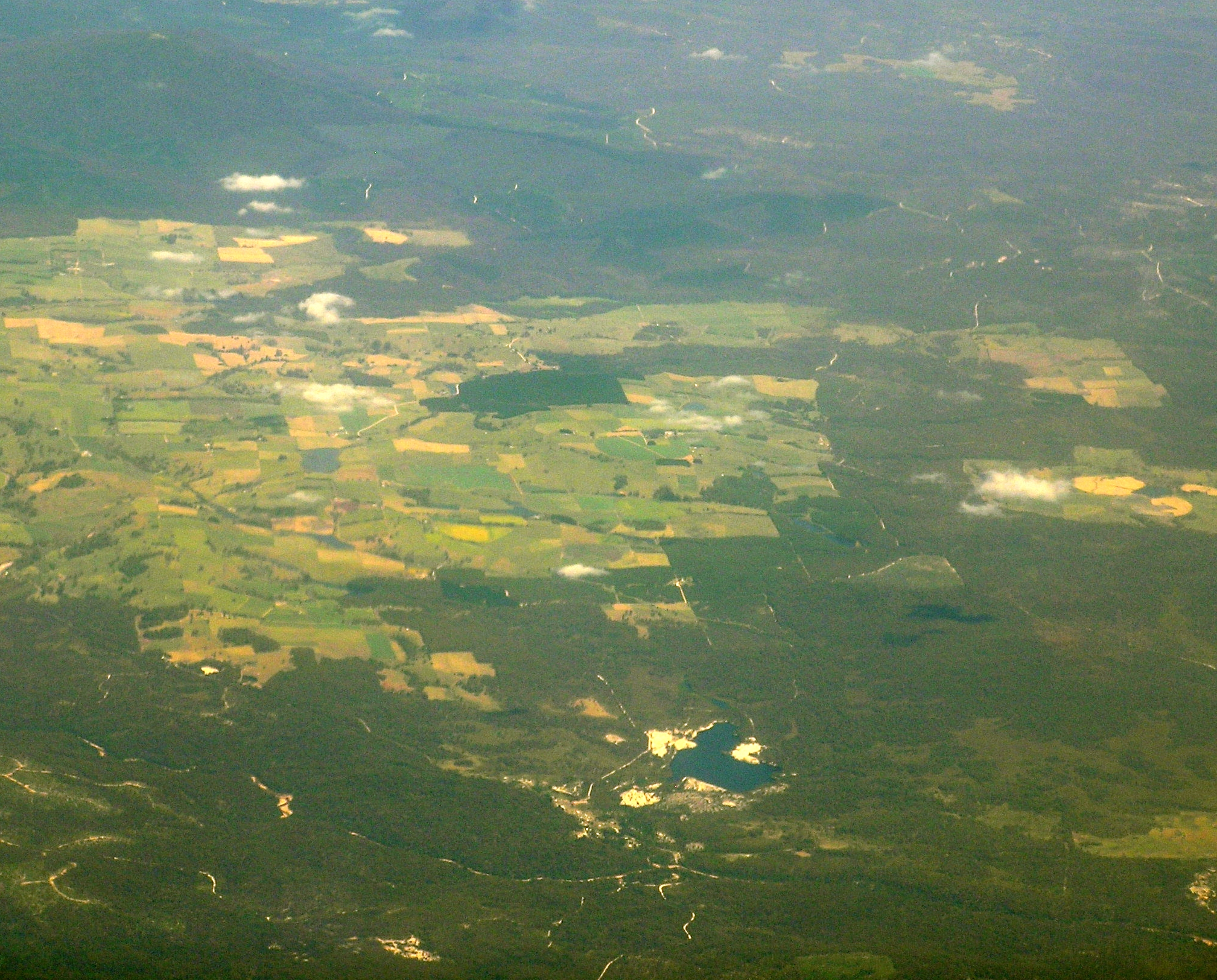
- Pioneer at the bottom of the photo, near the boomerang-shaped Pioneer Lake

- Coordinates: 41°05′S 147°56′E
- Country: Australia
- State: Tasmania
- Region: North-east
- LGA: Dorset Council
- Location: 50 km (31 mi) NE of Scottsdale

Government
  - State electorate: Bass
  - Federal division: Bass

Population
  - Total: 89 (2016 census)
- Postcode: 7264
Localities around Pioneer
Banca	South Mount Cameron	Gladstone
Herrick, Moorina	Pioneer	Gladstone
Weldborough	Weldborough	Goulds Country

Pioneer is a rural locality in the local government area (LGA) of Dorset in the North-east LGA region of Tasmania. The locality is about 50 kilometres (31 mi) north-east of the town of Scottsdale. The 2016 census recorded a population of 89 for the state suburb of Pioneer.

== History ==
Pioneer was gazetted as a locality in 1955. The previous name was “Bradshaw Creek” after William Bradshaw, who founded the Pioneer Tin Mine. The name was changed to Pioneer in 1955, but had been in use as early as 1902. Bradshaw's Creek Post Office opened on 1 July 1883 and was renamed Pioneer in 1955.

== Geography ==
The Ringarooma River flows through from west to north. The Wynford River enters from the south and flows north to meet the Ringarooma River in the centre.

== Road infrastructure ==
Route B82 (Gladstone Road / Main Road) passes through from west to north. Route C839 (Racecourse Road) starts at an intersection with B82 and runs north-west until it exits. Route C841 (Tebrakunna Road) starts at an intersection with B82 and runs east until it exits.
