= Cuckoo, Tasmania =

Cuckoo
- Town
- Coordinates: 41°12′27″S 147°34′38″E
- Country: Australia
- State: Tasmania
- Region: North-east
- LGA: Dorset
- Location: 9 km (5.6 mi) SE of Scottsdale

Government
  - State electorate: Bass
  - Federal division: Bass

Population
  - Total: 44 (SAL 2021)
- Postcode: 7260
Localities around Cuckoo
Scottsdale	Tonganah	Tulendeena
Springfield	Cuckoo	Tulendeena
South Springfield	Ringarooma	Ringarooma

Cuckoo is a rural locality in the local government area (LGA) of Dorset in the North-east LGA region of Tasmania. The locality is about 9 kilometres (5.6 mi) south-east of the town of Scottsdale. The 2016 census recorded a population of 53 for the state suburb of Cuckoo.

== History ==
Cuckoo was gazetted as a locality in 1969.

The locality is a logging area. A telegraph station named Cuckoo Valley operated from 1925 to 1929.

== Geography ==
The Great Forester River forms a small part of the north-western boundary.

== Road infrastructure ==
Route A3 (Tasman Highway) passes to the north. Cuckoo Road provides access to the locality.
