= Jetsonville, Tasmania =

Jetsonville
- Town
- Coordinates: 41°06′33″S 147°27′48″E
- Country: Australia
- State: Tasmania
- Region: North-east
- LGA: Dorset
- Location: 8 km (5.0 mi) NW of Scottsdale

Government
  - State electorate: Bass
  - Federal division: Bass

Population
  - Total: 137 (2016 census)
- Postcode: 7260
Localities around Jetsonville
Bridport	Bridport	North Scottsdale
Lietinna, Bridport	Jetsonville	North Scottsdale
Lietinna	Lietinna, Scottsdale	Scottsdale

Jetsonville is a rural locality in the local government area (LGA) of Dorset in the North-east LGA region of Tasmania. The locality is about 8 kilometres (5.0 mi) north-west of the town of Scottsdale. The 2016 census recorded a population of 137 for the state suburb of Jetsonville.

== History ==
Jetsonville was gazetted as a locality in 1964. It was named for a family called Jetson who owned land in the area from 1860. The name was in official use by 1879, by which date a school had opened.

Initially it was a mining area but soon became a farming centre.

== Geography ==
The Brid River forms part of the south-western boundary before flowing through to the north-west.

== Road infrastructure ==
Route B84 (Bridport Road) passes through from south-east to north.
