= Golconda, Tasmania =

Golconda Tasmania
- Coordinates: 41°12′03″S 147°17′49″E
- Population: 26 (2016 census)
- Postcode(s): 7254
- Location: 31 km (19 mi) SW of Scottsdale
- LGA(s): Launceston, Dorset
- Region: Launceston, North-east
- State electorate(s): Bass
- Federal division(s): Bass
Localities around Golconda:
Pipers Brook	Bridport	Bridport
Wyena, Pipers Brook	Golconda	Nabowla
Wyena	Lisle	Nabowla

Golconda is a rural locality in the local government areas of Launceston and Dorset, in the Launceston and North-east regions of Tasmania. It is located about 31 kilometres (19 mi) south-west of the town of Scottsdale. The 2016 census determined a population of 26 for the state suburb of Golconda.

== History ==
The locality has the name of an ancient and now ruined city in India. It was gazetted as a locality in 1956.

== Geography ==
The Denison River passes through from west to north-east.

== Road infrastructure ==
Route B81 route (Golconda Road) passes through from west to east. The C826 route (Ferny Hills Road) starts at an intersection with B81 in the centre and exits to the north.
