= Tonganah, Tasmania =

Tonganah
- Town
- Coordinates: 41°10′22″S 147°37′11″E
- Country: Australia
- State: Tasmania
- Region: North-east
- LGA: Dorset
- Location: 11 km (6.8 mi) E of Scottsdale

Government
  - State electorate: Bass
  - Federal division: Bass

Population
  - Total: 26 (2016 census)
- Postcode: 7260
Localities around Tonganah
North Scottsdale	North Scottsdale	Kamona
Scottsdale	Tonganah	Tulendeena
Scottsdale	Cuckoo	Cuckoo

Tonganah is a rural locality in the local government area of Dorset in the North-east region of Tasmania. It is located about 11 kilometres (6.8 mi) east of the town of Scottsdale. The 2016 census determined a population of 26 for the state suburb of Tonganah.

== History ==
Tonganah was gazetted as a locality in 1979. The name is an Aboriginal word meaning "to swallow".

== Geography ==
The Great Forester River passes through from south-west to north.

== Road infrastructure ==
The Tasman Highway (A3) passes through from south-west to east. Route C831 (Jensens Road) starts at an intersection with A3 and runs north before exiting.
