= Wyena, Tasmania =

Wyena Tasmania
- Coordinates: 41°10′32″S 147°15′51″E
- Population: 24 (2016 census)
- Postcode(s): 7254
- Location: 27 km (17 mi) W of Scottsdale
- LGA(s): Dorset, Launceston
- Region: North-east, Launceston
- State electorate(s): Bass
- Federal division(s): Bass
Localities around Wyena:
Lebrina	Golconda	Golconda
North Lilydale, Lebrina	Wyena	Golconda
North Lilydale	North Lilydale	Lisle

Wyena is a rural locality in the local government areas (LGA) of Dorset and Launceston in the North-east and Launceston LGA regions of Tasmania. The locality is about 27 kilometres (17 mi) west of the town of Scottsdale. The 2016 census recorded a population of 24 for the state suburb of Wyena.

== History ==
Wyena was gazetted as a locality in 1964. The name is believed to be an Aboriginal word for “small timber”.

== Geography ==
The boundaries consist primarily of survey lines and ridge lines.

== Road infrastructure ==
Route B81 (Golconda Road) passes through from west to east.
