= Dorset Council (Australia) =

- Local government area
- Interactive map of Dorset Council
- Coordinates: 41.0706°S 147.7089°E
- Country: Australia
- State: Tasmania
- Region: North-east Tasmania
- Established: 2 April 1993
- Council seat: Scottsdale

Government
  - Mayor: Vacant
  - State electorate: Bass
  - Federal division: Bass

Area
  - Total: 3,231 km^{2} (1,247 sq mi)
- Website: Dorset Council
LGAs around Dorset Council
Bass Strait	Bass Strait	Flinders
George Town	Dorset Council	Tasman Sea
Launceston	Break O'Day	Break O'Day

Dorset Council is a local government body in Tasmania, located in the far north-east of the state mainland. Dorset is classified as a rural local government area and has a population of 6,652. The major towns and localities of the region include Bridport, Derby and Ringarooma with Scottsdale the regional centre. Dorset was placed under a board of inquiry on 2 August 2023 and is currently under the supervision of commissioner Wardlaw. The current general manager is John Marik.

== History and attributes ==
The municipality was established on 2 April 1993 after the amalgamation of the Scottsdale and Ringarooma municipalities. Dorset is classified as regional, agricultural and large under the Australian Classification of Local Governments.

== Council ==
=== Current composition ===
Name	Position	Party
Vacant	Mayor	Independent
Wendy McLennan	Councillor	Independent
Vincent Teichmann	Councillor	Independent
Jan Hughes	Councillor	Independent
Nick Bicanic	Councillor	Independent
James Cashion	Councillor	Independent
Edwina Powell	Councillor	Independent
Mervyn Chilcott	Councillor	Independent
Kahlia Simmons	Councillor	Independent

=== 2022 election results ===
2022 Tasmanian local elections: Dorset
Party	Candidate	Votes	%	±%
Independent Liberal	Greg Howard (elected)	1,159	25.25	
Independent	Beth Donoghue (elected)	653	14.23	
Independent	Kahlia Simmons (elected)	400	8.71	
Independent	Anna Coxen (elected)	317	6.91	
Independent	Edwina Powell (elected)	300	6.54	
Independent	Jerrod Nichols (elected)	293	6.38	
Independent	Dale Jessup (elected)	289	6.30	
Independent	Leonie Stein (elected)	261	5.69	
Independent	Nick Bicanic	208	4.53	
Independent	Mervyn Chilcott (elected)	159	3.46	
Independent	Wendy McLennan	157	3.42	
Independent	Karlene Cuthbertson	140	3.05	
Independent	Jan Hughes	105	2.29	
Independent	James Cashion	93	2.03	
Independent	Vincent Teichmann	56	1.22	
Total formal votes		4,590	97.56	
Informal votes		115	2.44	
Turnout		4,705	84.97	

== Suburbs ==
Locality	Census population 2016	Reason
Bridport	1568	
Tomahawk	48	Includes The Chimneys
Boobyalla	0	
Cape Portland	0	
Musselroe Bay	40	
Rushy Lagoon	30	
The Chimneys		Incl. in Tomahawk
Gladstone	139	
South Mount Cameron	15	
Banca	0	
Waterhouse	90	
Alberton	0	
Legunia		Incl. in Ringarooma
South Springfield	25	
Springfield	188	
Lisle	0	
Nabowla	112	Includes Koomeela
Golconda	26	
Wyena	24	
Jetsonville	137	
Lietinna	58	
Blumont	31	
Scottsdale	2373	
Koomeela		Incl. in Nabowla
Cuckoo	53	
Tonganah	26	
Tulendeena	12	
Legerwood	193	
Ringarooma	338	
Talawa	53	
Trenah	11	
Forester	8	
Branxholm	267	
Telita	22	
Warrentinna	0	
Winnaleah	225	
Moorina	11	
Herrick	52	
Pioneer	89	
North Scottsdale	122	
Kamona	11	
West Scottsdale	58	
Lebrina	192	
Tunnel	73	
Total	6,720	
	(103)	Variance
Local government total	6,617	Gazetted Dorset local government area

=== Not in above list ===
- North Lilydale
- Pipers Brook
- Tayene
- Upper Esk
- Weldborough

=== Errors in above list ===
- Lebrina is wholly within Launceston Council area.
- Tunnel is wholly within Launceston area.

== See also ==
- List of local government areas of Tasmania
