= Trenah =

- Town
- Coordinates: 41°19′02″S 147°42′19″E
- Country: Australia
- State: Tasmania
- Region: North-east
- LGA: Dorset
- Location: 41 km (25 mi) SE of Scottsdale

Government
  - State electorate: Bass
  - Federal division: Bass

Population
  - Total: 11 (2016 census)
- Postcode: 7263
Localities around Trenah
Ringarooma	Talawa, Ringarooma	Ringarooma
Tayene	Trenah	Ringarooma
Tayene	Upper Esk	Upper Esk

Trenah is a rural locality in the local government area (LGA) of Dorset in the North-east LGA region of Tasmania. The locality is about 41 kilometres (25 mi) south-east of the town of Scottsdale. The 2016 census recorded a population of 11 for the state suburb of Trenah.

== History ==
Trenah was gazetted as a locality in 1976. The name is believed to be an Aboriginal word for "baskets".

The locality, on the eastern side of Mount Maurice, was once known as "The Maurice".

== Geography ==
The boundaries consist primarily of survey lines and ridge lines.

== Road infrastructure ==
Route C426 (Barnett Road) passes to the north-east. East Maurice Road and Maurice Road provide access to the locality.
