= Lisle, Tasmania =

Lisle Tasmania
- Coordinates: 41°14′05″S 147°19′38″E
- Population: nil (2016 census)
- Postcode(s): 7260
- Location: 32 km (20 mi) SW of Scottsdale
- LGA(s): Dorset
- Region: North-east
- State electorate(s): Bass
- Federal division(s): Bass
Localities around Lisle:
Golconda	Nabowla	Nabowla
Lilydale, North Lilydale, Wyena	Lisle	Nabowla
Underwood	Myrtle Bank	Myrtle Bank

Lisle is a rural locality in the local government area (LGA) of Dorset in the North-east LGA region of Tasmania. The locality is about 32 kilometres (20 mi) south-west of the town of Scottsdale. The 2016 census recorded a population of nil for the state suburb of Lisle.

== History ==
Lisle was gazetted as a locality in 1964. It is believed that the name was bestowed by Governor Robert Hamilton to honour his wife, whose maiden surname was “de Lisle”.

Gold was discovered here in 1879. It is now a timber producing area.

== Geography ==
The boundaries of the locality are primarily survey lines and ridge lines.

== Road infrastructure ==
Route B81 (Golconda Road) passes to the north, and Virginia Road provides access to the locality. Access is also available from the Tasman Highway to the south, via Targa Hill Road (Route C828) Patersonia Road, and Bessells Road.
