= Warrentinna =

- Town
- Coordinates: 41°05′57″S 147°44′54″E
- Country: Australia
- State: Tasmania
- Region: North-east
- LGA: Dorset
- Location: 35 km (22 mi) NE of Scottsdale

Government
  - State electorate: Bass
  - Federal division: Bass

Population
  - Total: nil (2016 census)
- Postcode: 7261
Localities around Warrentinna
Forester	Winnaleah, Forester	Winnaleah
Forester, Kamona	Warrentinna	Winnaleah, Telita
Kamona	Branxholm	Telita, Branxholm

Warrentinna is a rural locality in the local government area of Dorset in the North-east region of Tasmania. It is located about 35 kilometres (22 mi) north-east of the town of Scottsdale. The 2016 census determined a population of zero for the state suburb of Warrentinna.

== History ==
Warrentinna was gazetted as a locality in 1969. The name is an Aboriginal word describing the area.

The Warrentinna goldfield was discovered by "Black Louey" in 1879. A township was set up in 1891. The miners exploited a number of reefs as tributers to various companies, and the township of Warrentinna was established.

Nearby the Mara siding on the Launceston and North East Railroad was established and later renamed to Warrentinna, when the railway was extended to Herrick in 1919.

The largest mine was Golden Mara closed in 1921, and the town was abandoned. Due to subsequent forestry operations there are no remains of the township, although there is still evidence of mining in the forest which is considered of regional historical significance.

== Geography ==
The Boobyalla River rises in the south of the locality and runs through to the north-east.

== Road infrastructure ==
The C835 route (Warrentinna Road) enters from the south-east and runs north and north-east before exiting in the north-east. Route C834 (Forester Road) starts at an intersection with C835 and runs north-west before exiting.
