= Moorina, Tasmania =

Moorina
- Town
- Coordinates: 41°08′00″S 147°52′16″E
- Country: Australia
- State: Tasmania
- Region: North-east
- LGA: Dorset
- Location: 46 km (29 mi) E of Scottsdale

Government
  - State electorate: Bass
  - Federal division: Bass

Population
  - Total: 11 (2016 census)
- Postcode: 7264
Localities around Moorina
Winnaleah	Herrick	Pioneer
Derby, Winnaleah	Moorina	Pioneer
Derby	Weldborough	Weldborough

Moorina is a rural locality in the local government area (LGA) of Dorset in the North-east LGA region of Tasmania. The locality is about 46 kilometres (29 mi) east of the town of Scottsdale. The 2016 census recorded a population of 11 for the state suburb of Moorina.

Mineral Resources Tasmania have designated a 2 km^{2} area of Moorina, to the east of the Tasman Highway, as the Weld River Fossicking Area. The collecting area is known for its sapphire, topaz and zircon specimens.

== History ==
Moorina was gazetted as a locality in 1869. Originally known as "Krushka’s Bridge", the current name was in use by 1877. Moorina was the sister of Truganini.

The Krushka brothers built the first bridge over the Ringarooma River. The area was originally settled as a mining town.

Moorina was the centre of the tin mining industry in the north east. By 1878 Chinese miners were present in all the major tin producing centres in the region: Weldborough, Branxholm, Gladston Pioneer and Moorina: The only exception was Derby richest mine of the region.

== Geography ==
The Ringarooma River forms part of the north-western boundary before flowing through to form part of the northern. The Weld River flows through from south to north, where it joins the Ringarooma River. The Frome River flows through, via the Frome Dam, to join the Weld.

== Road infrastructure ==
Route A3 (Tasman Highway) passes through from north-west to south-west.
