= Branxholm, Tasmania =

Town in Tasmania, Australia

Branxholm
- Town
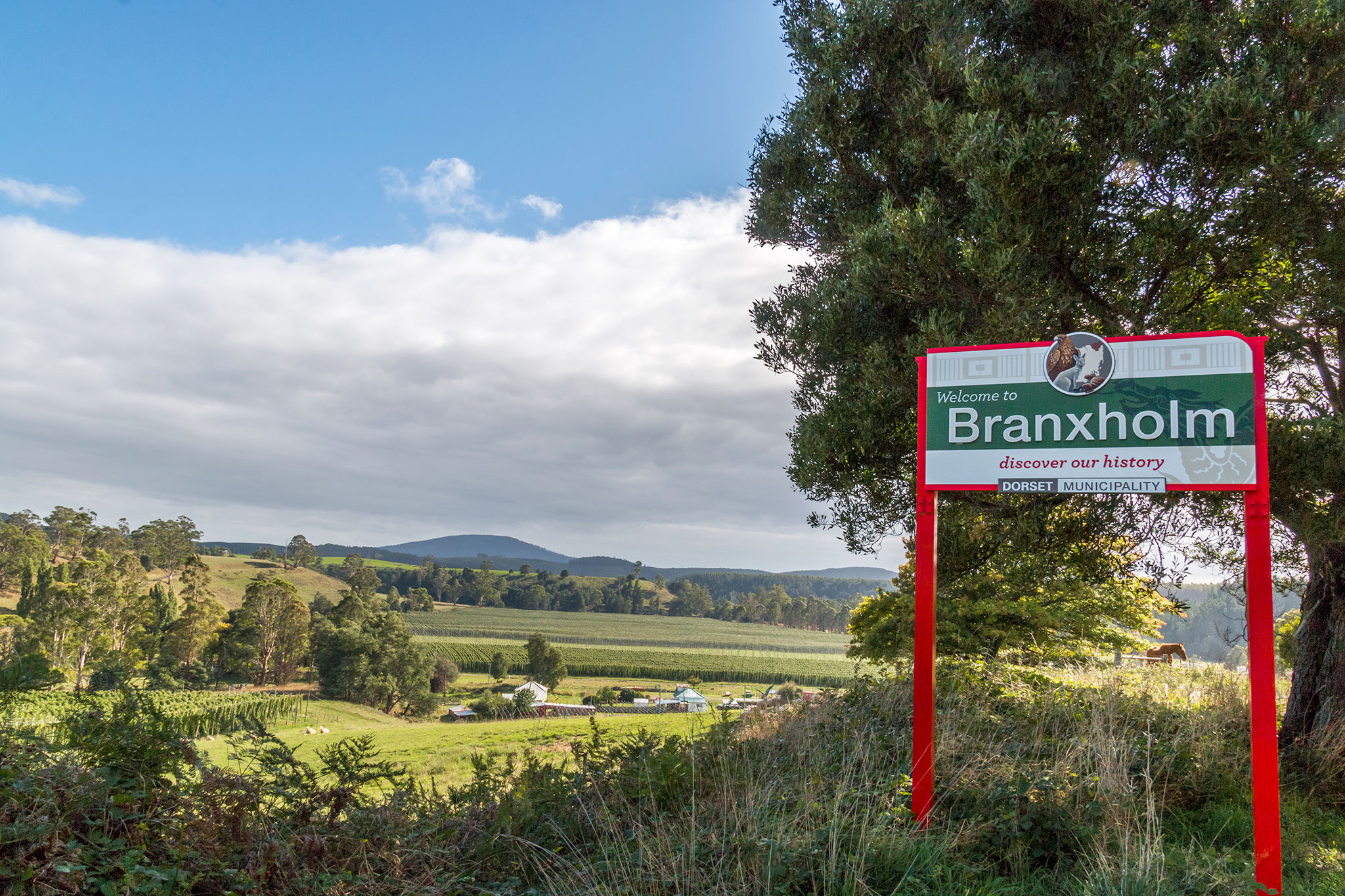
- Welcome to Branxholm sign
- Country: Australia
- State: Tasmania

Population
  - Total: 236

Branxholm is a scenic rural town on the banks of the Ringarooma River in north east Tasmania located 93 km north east of Launceston on the Tasman Highway. It is part of Dorset Council. It is notable for its saw mill, hop fields and tourism. It has a sprawling street pattern which makes the small town spread across the valley floor.

== History ==
The area was first settled by James Reid Scott who named it after a small village in his native Scotland. By 1870 there were only three buildings in the valley but three years later, with the discovery of tin, a shanty town had grown up.

The Branxholm Post Office opened on 1 August 1876.

By 1877 the population was around 300, but many others were living nearby in tin mining camps like Ruby Flats. No Chinese lived within Branxholm itself.

In 1883 the town was proclaimed.

In the 1890's the Warrentinna Goldfield opened just north of the town,

The importance of mining gradually declined. The Golden Mara Mine (gold) closed in 1920 and the Arba Tin Mine, just east of the town, was unprofitable by 1921; although the company continued operations for many years with tributors processing the mine tailings. Eventually, mining was replaced by timber cutting.but mining gradually declined to be replaced by timber cutting.

In 1970 the first hop fields were planted.

Since the official opening of the Blue Derby Mountain bike trails in neighbouring Derby in 2015 tourism as an industry has become important to the economy of Branxholm. In the few years since the opening of the trails new businesses catering to tourists opened, including cafes and tourist accommodation.

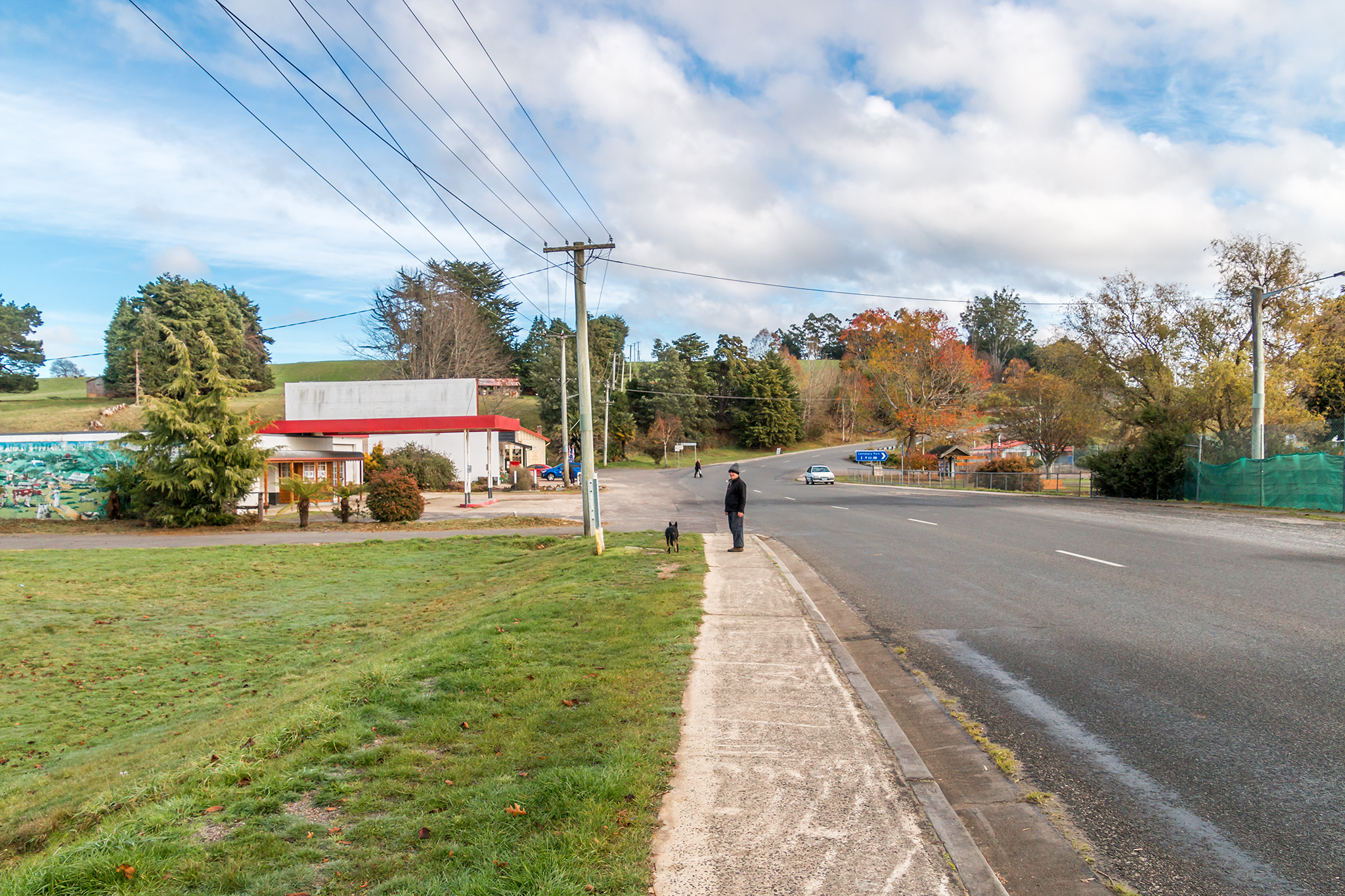
Scott Street is the main road through Branxholm. The local IGA supermarket is in the background.

== For visitors ==
Branxholm's main shopping area provides an IGA supermarket, Pharmacy, Mechanic, Cafe and Art Gallery, Italian-style restaurant, wood-fired pizza restaurant and the heritage Imperial Hotel (circa 1907). This provides a hub of services to the community and visitors.

There are several tourism and short-stay accommodation options in the town and nearby at the Mara Ponds Gardens. Camping is free at the Centenary Park where there is a tennis/basketball court.

The Branxholm Community Hall has regular market and flower shows. Outdoor community events are showcased at the Public Recreation Grounds where there is an oval and netball court.

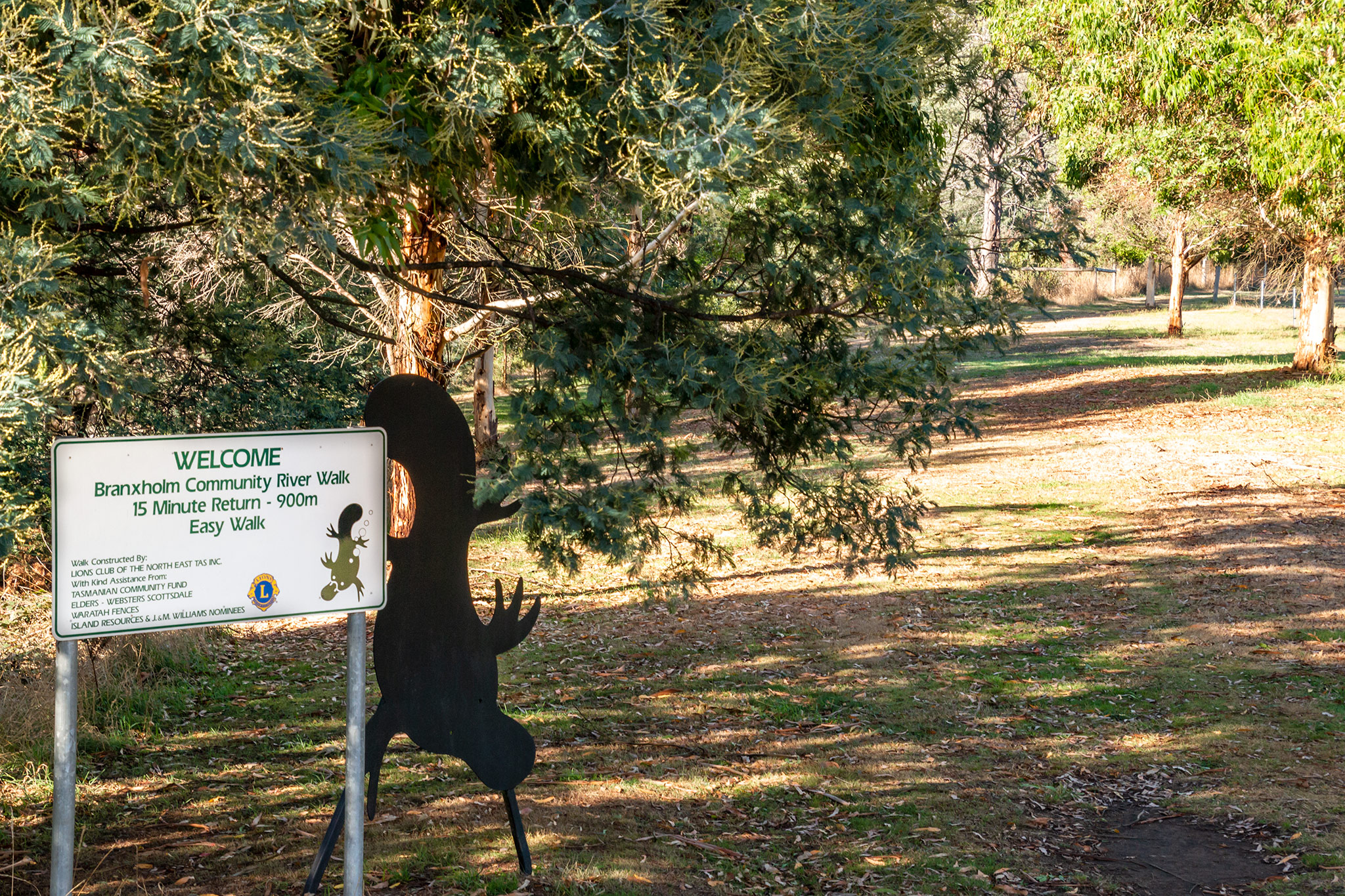
Branxholm community riverwalk

The Branxholm community riverwalk is an opportunity to utilize the river for fishing, swimming and picnics.

Close to the town Mount Horror, known for excellent scenic views, is surrounded by extensive pine and gum plantations. The Forestry Commission's fire tower is open to the public when attended in the summer.

=== Tin Mining History ===
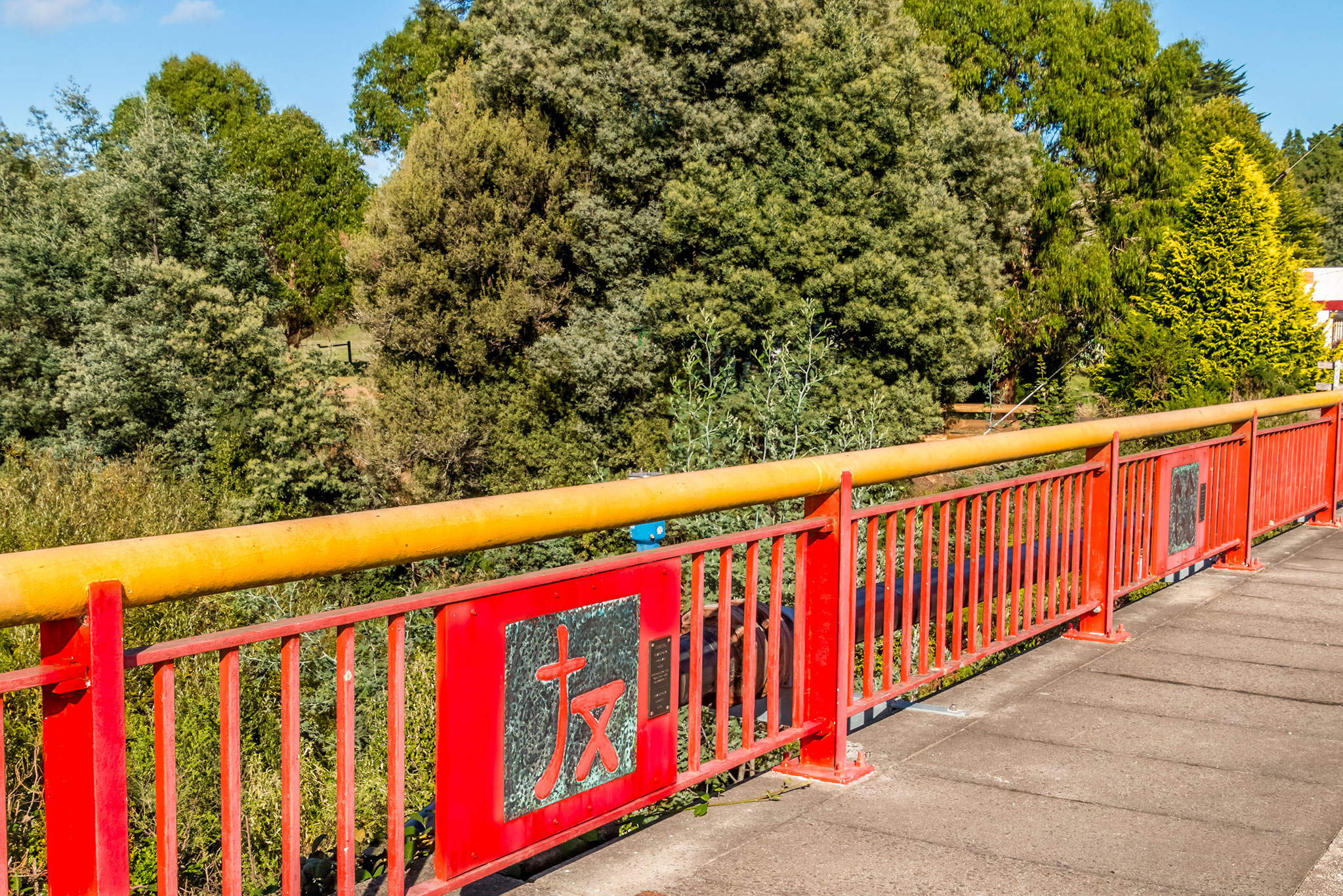
The red bridge in Branxholm commemorates the town's rich Chinese tin-mining history

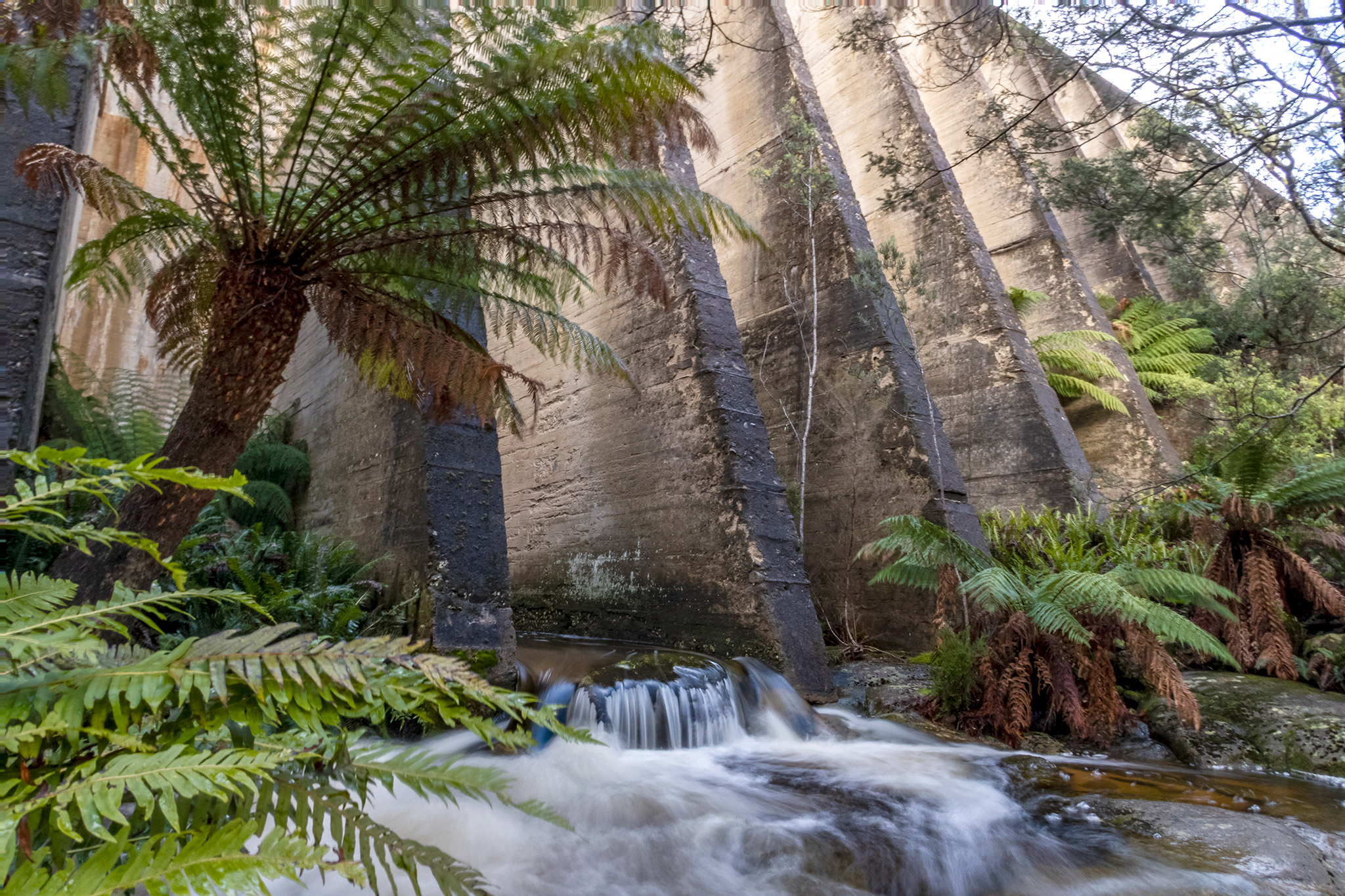
Mount Paris Dam near Branxholm in North East Tasmania

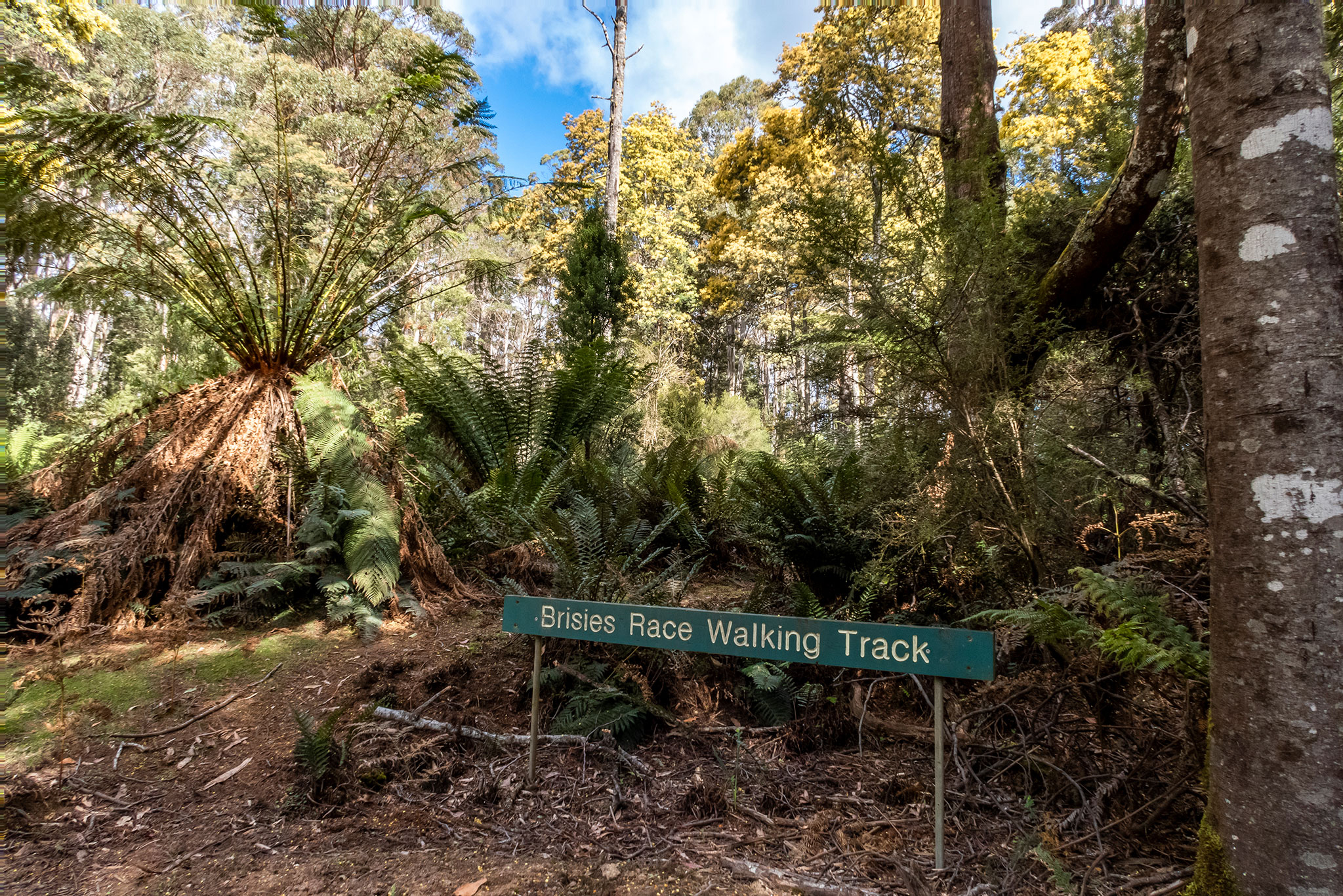
Briseis Water Race walking track

Tin mining was initially small scale with tin miners working numerous claims south of Branxholm, diverting streams to sluice boxes to extract alluvial tin.

In September 1877 tin prices were in decline. There was a conflict between the mining communities when about 12 Chinese miners, recruited to work at Pearce’s Ruby Flats claim, were stopped by a group of angry European miners who refused to let them pass over the bridge at Branxholm. The party returned to Scottsdale and sought police protection to enable their safe passage to the mine. This incident is described as Tasmania's only race riot.

As the easily won alluvial tin was worked out the rich deep leads at Derby (the Briseis mine), Branxholm (the Arba mine) and the Blue Tier (the Anchor mine) were worked by large capital intensive operations, from which the Chinese were excluded.

The Chinese continued to work the small claims under the tribute system. This caused friction with wage-earning miners who saw this as a threat their income..

The red bridge in Branxholm was a community project completed in 2003 to commemorate the rich Chinese mining history of the town.

Water is needed for hydraulic tin-mining, and mines would often have to close due to summer droughts. There is a legacy of mining holes, water races and dams in the regrowth forest as well as the remnants of major works.

The Brother’s Home water race used to run from Fenckers Creek for use in mining operations at the Brother’s Mine in Derby (originally named Brother’s Home). There was a proposal to build a canal to channel the Ringarooma River to Gladstone in 1885.

The Briseis Water Race is a feat of engineering. Commenced in 1901, it was hand-built by three gangs of approximately 100 men in each. It was constructed from either end of the 48 km length, simultaneously and section by section over a period of just 15 months. Water harnessed from behind Ringarooma was channelled along the race to Derby, to provide a minimum of 24 million gallons daily to the large scale hydraulic mining at the Briseis Tin Mine, with the first release of water taking three weeks to reach the mine!

A section of the race is preserved as the Great Briseis Water Race Walk on Ruby Flats Road; where the remains of four metre deep cuttings through solid rock, sections of original stonewalling, remains of timber trestle fluming structures, and many other insights into the character of those who undertook this mighty task may be seen.

The impressive pillar and slab dam walls of the Mount Paris Dam were constructed in 1937 to feed the Mt Paris Mine with an 11km water race.

== Rail Trail ==
Construction of the Dorset Rail Trail was a local Scottsdale Rotary Club project. The trail follows the old railway corridor from Tonganah to Tulendeena and hopefully later to Legerwood. The trail is used by cyclists, walkers and horse-riders. Each year in August the Trail Run and Ride competitive event is held. The event distances range from 56 km to 2 km, from Scottsdale township to the top of Billycock Hill and return.

== Sport ==
The town used to have a football team in the NEFU (North Eastern Football Union).

== Railway ==
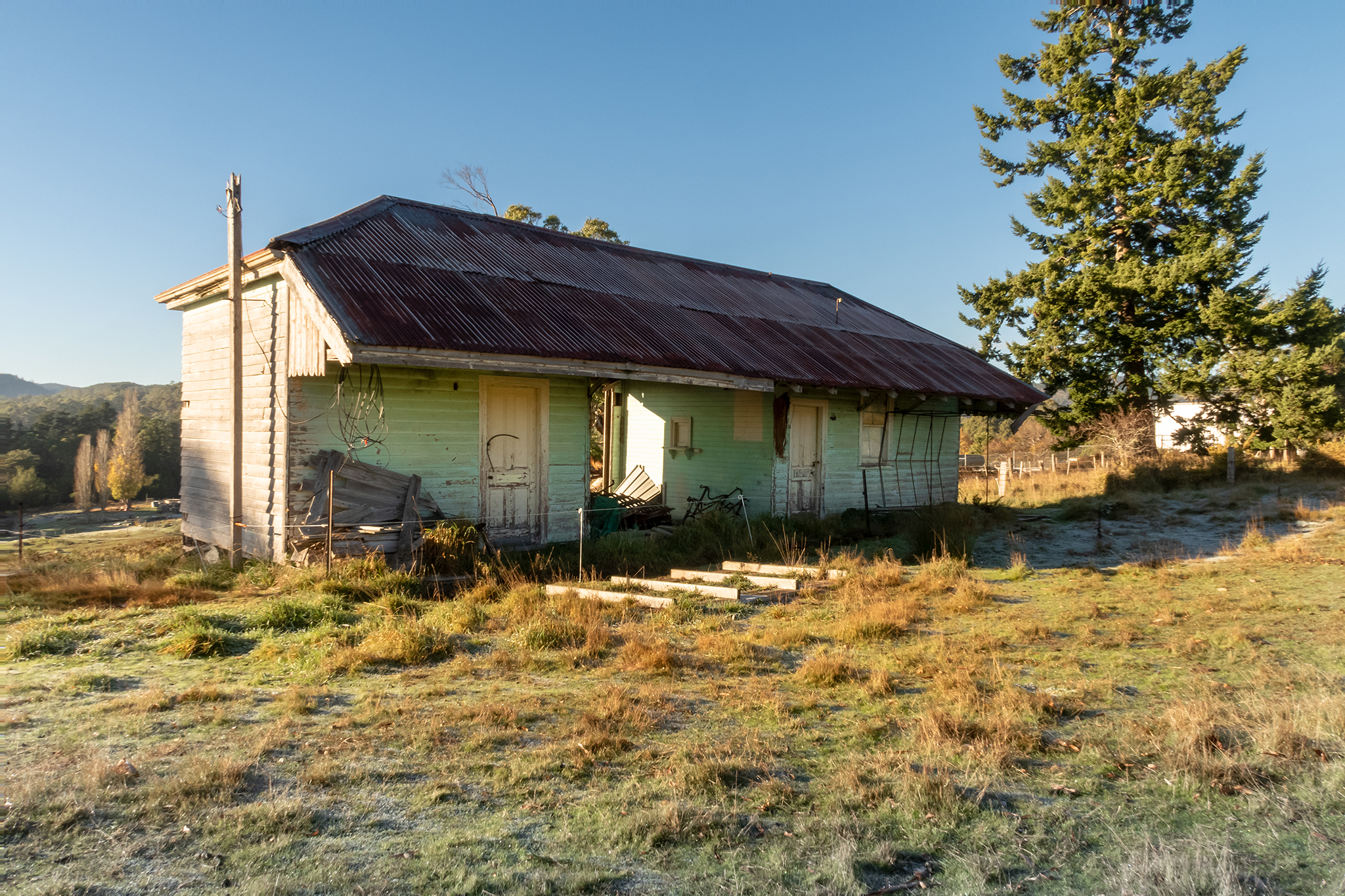
The old Branxholm railway station (now a hay barn) sits in a paddock on the outskirts of the town.

Branxholm was served by a branch railway line which extended from Launceston to Herrick, 4 km short of Moorina. The State rail connected Branxholm to its system in 1911.

By 1978, the last passenger trains closed down in Tasmania and the rail network, including the Launceston-Scottsdale line, focused on carrying freight. By the early 1980s there were just three daily services between Scottsdale and Launceston transporting logs, woodchips and other goods however, by 2005, the line was closed.

The railway to Branxholm closed in April, 1992.
