= Derby, Tasmania =

Derby
- Town
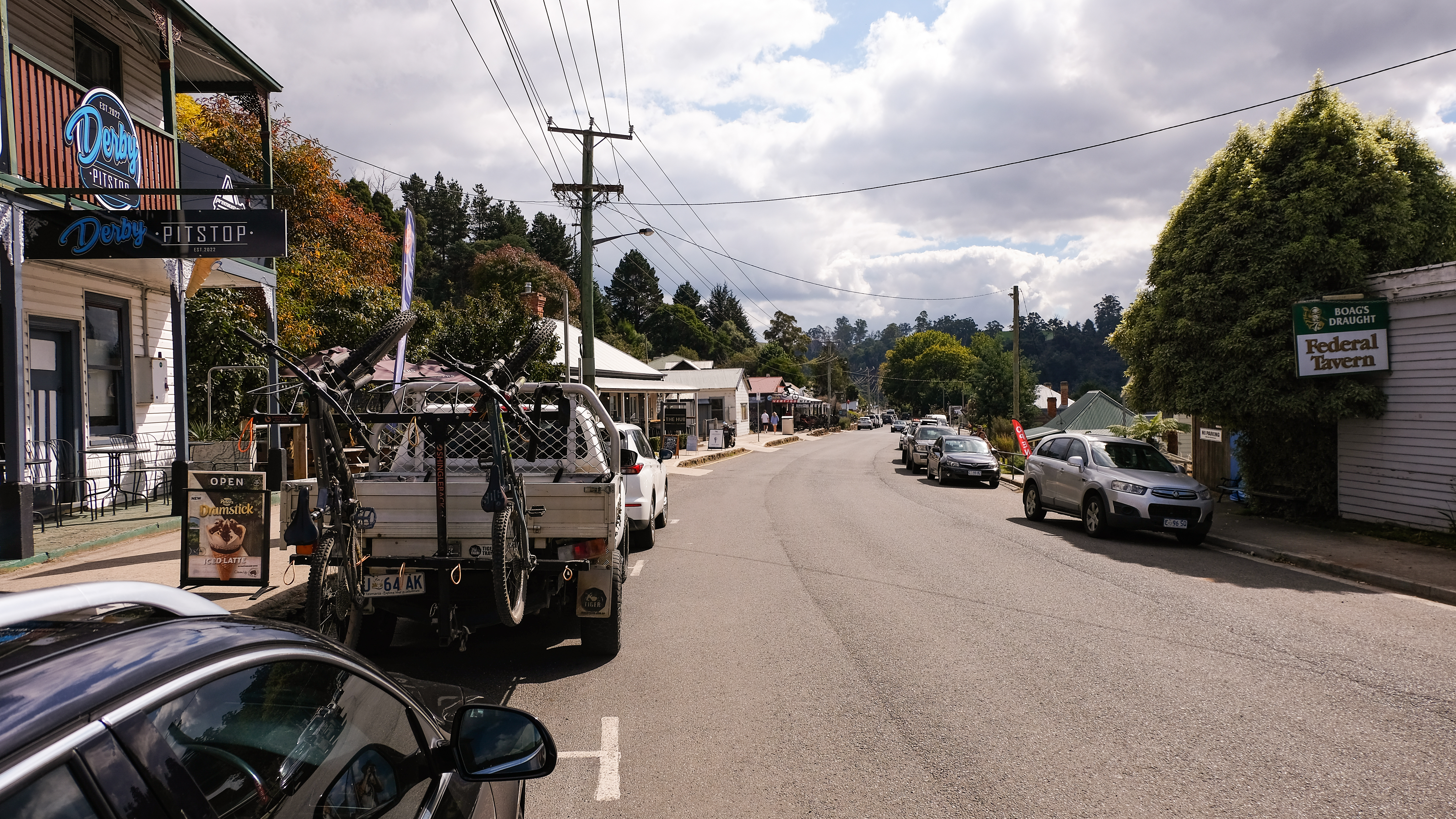
- Main Street, Derby

- Coordinates: 41°09′S 147°48′E
- Country: Australia
- State: Tasmania
- LGA: Dorset Council
- Location: 35 km (22 mi) E of Scottsdale; 100 km (62 mi) E of Launceston; 300 km (190 mi) NNE of Hobart
- Established: 1874

Government
  - State electorate: Bass
  - Federal division: Bass

Area
  - Total: 77.7 km^{2} (30.0 sq mi)
- Elevation: 164 m (538 ft)

Population
  - Total: 109 (2021)
  - Density: 2.3/km^{2} (6.0/sq mi)
- Postcode: 7264
- Mean max temp: 18.5 °C (65.3 °F)
- Mean min temp: 7.1 °C (44.8 °F)
- Annual rainfall: 1,172.9 mm (46.18 in)

Derby (/ˈdɜːrbi/ DUR-bee) is a town in the north-east of Tasmania, Australia. It is situated on the Ringarooma River at the junction of the Cascade River, and is administered by the Dorset Council. The town was historically a hub for tin mining and has since been transformed into a major adventure tourism destination, renowned for its extensive network of mountain bike trails. At the 2021 census, Derby had a population of 109.

== History ==
=== Pre-colonial era ===
The region encompassing Derby is part of the traditional lands of the Trawlwoolway people of the North East nation. Their presence in the area dates back thousands of years before European settlement.

=== Establishment and tin mining boom ===
Although the area was surveyed in 1855, settlement did not begin until 1874 when George Renison Bell discovered tin in a creek bed near his camp. This discovery triggered a mining boom, and the settlement, initially known as Brother's Home, was established. The town's economic viability was solidified when the Krushka brothers (immigrants from Prussia) discovered a significant lode of tin. They established The Brothers' Mine, which later became the world-renowned Briseis Mine after it was sold to a London-based company in 1893.

The town was renamed Derby in 1885, believed to be in honour of Edward Smith-Stanley, 14th Earl of Derby, a former Prime Minister of the United Kingdom. A post office, opened as Brother's Home on 1 August 1882, was subsequently renamed Derby.

By the late 19th century, Derby had become a bustling mining town with a population exceeding 3,000. The Briseis Mine was a major operation, producing over 120 tonnes (120 long tons; 130 short tons) of tin per month. The boom also attracted a significant population of Chinese miners, whose legacy is commemorated by the Tin Dragon Trail and a dedicated monument and cemetery. To manage mining operations and tailings, the Derby Tunnel was constructed in the 1880s to divert the Cascade River.

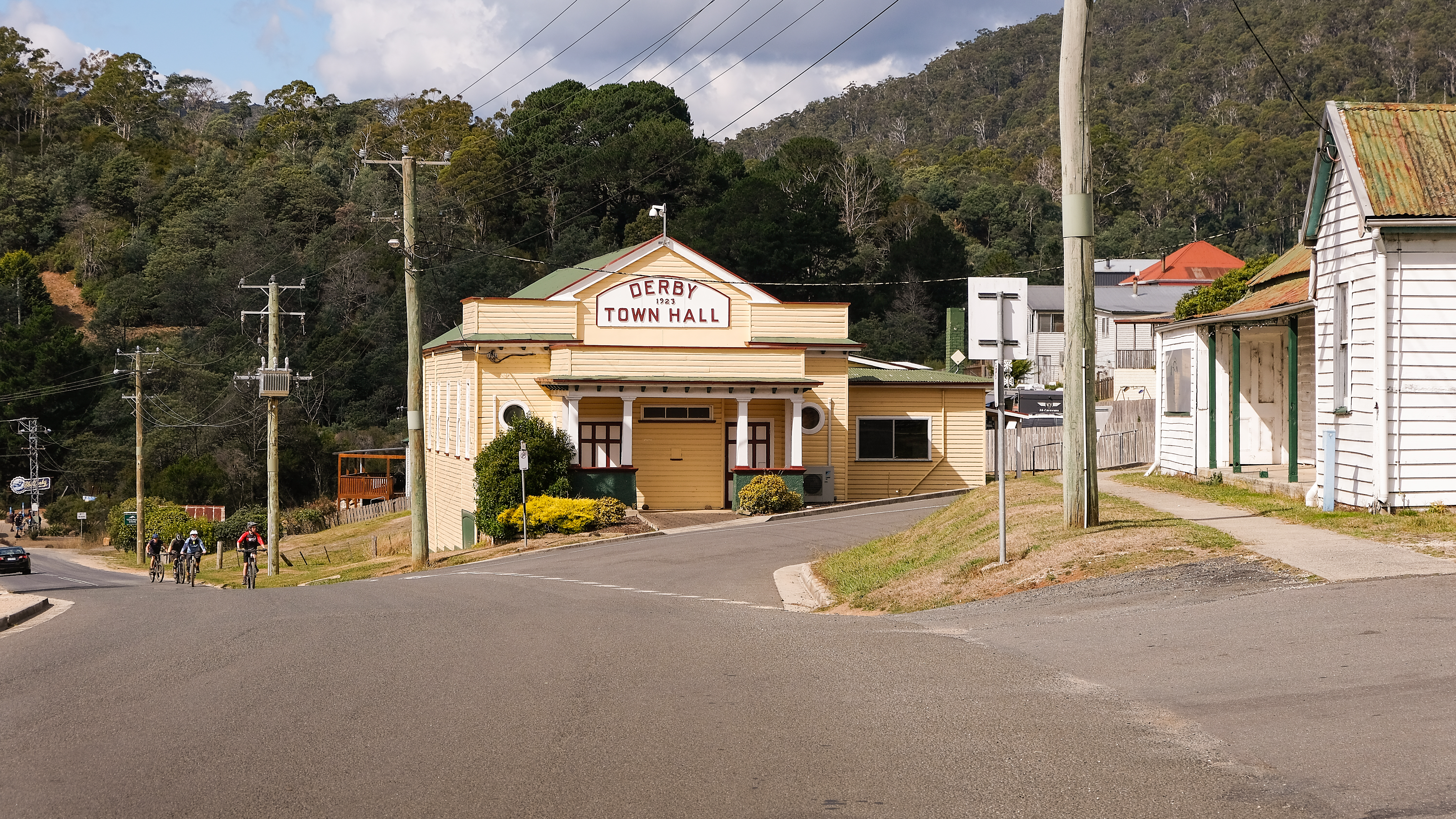
Derby Town Hall, erected 1923

The town's infrastructure grew with its population. The original town hall from 1888 was replaced in 1923. Built by local resident George Albert Rodman for £1,200, the new hall was officially opened on 12 July 1923, with over 350 people attending a celebration featuring the Branxholm Orchestra.

=== 1929 flood and decline ===
On 4 April 1929, following a period of exceptionally heavy rainfall, the Briseis Dam on the Cascade River collapsed. A torrent of water surged through the town, destroying buildings and causing widespread devastation. The disaster resulted in the deaths of 14 people and brought the town's mining industry to an abrupt halt.

The Briseis Mine was eventually reopened in 1934, but it never regained its former levels of production and was forced to close permanently in 1948, marking the end of Derby's reign as a major tin mining centre. For the latter half of the 20th century, the town's economy relied on forestry, agriculture, and small-scale tourism.

Derby was served by a branch railway line which extended from Launceston to Herrick, 4 kilometres (2.5 mi) short of Moorina. The line through Derby Station which was situated about 2 kilometres (1.2 mi) from the town centre, opened on 15 March 1919. The railway facilitated the transport of timber and agricultural products but was closed in April 1992 as road transport became more dominant.

== Geography ==
Derby is located in the temperate rainforests of North-East Tasmania, nestled in a valley at the confluence of the Ringarooma River and the Cascade River. The town is surrounded by steep, densely forested hills dominated by myrtle beech trees and ferns. The landscape is marked by remnants of its mining history, including the rebuilt Cascade Dam and the larger, abandoned Mt Paris Dam upstream, which is now being reclaimed by the forest.

== Climate ==
Derby has an oceanic climate (Cfb) with mild, damp summers and cool, wet winters. According to historical data from the now-closed Derby (State School) weather station, rainfall is consistent and heavy throughout the year, averaging 1,150.6 millimetres (45.30 in) annually. Average daily maxima ranged from 21.7 °C (71.1 °F) in February to 11.4 °C (52.5 °F) in July, with average daily minima from 9.9 °C (49.8 °F) in February to 2.9 °C (37.2 °F) in July.

Climate data for Derby (State School) (BoM site 091316, 41°09′S 147°48′E, 164 m AMSL)
Month	Jan	Feb	Mar	Apr	May	Jun	Jul	Aug	Sep	Oct	Nov	Dec	Year
Mean daily maximum °C	21.6	21.7	20.1	16.9	14.0	11.9	11.4	12.5	14.1	16.3	18.2	20.0	16.6
Mean daily minimum °C	9.8	9.9	8.6	6.9	5.2	3.6	2.9	3.7	4.8	6.1	7.5	8.8	6.5
Average precipitation mm	65.5	56.6	72.8	86.8	101.9	117.8	129.5	131.7	110.8	105.7	89.9	81.6	1,150.6
Mean daily maximum °F	70.9	71.1	68.2	62.4	57.2	53.4	52.5	54.5	57.4	61.3	64.8	68.0	61.9
Mean daily minimum °F	49.6	49.8	47.5	44.4	41.4	38.5	37.2	38.7	40.6	43.0	45.5	47.8	43.7
Average precipitation inches	2.58	2.23	2.87	3.42	4.01	4.64	5.10	5.19	4.36	4.16	3.54	3.21	45.30
Source: Bureau of Meteorology (1969–1996 normals)

== Mountain biking ==
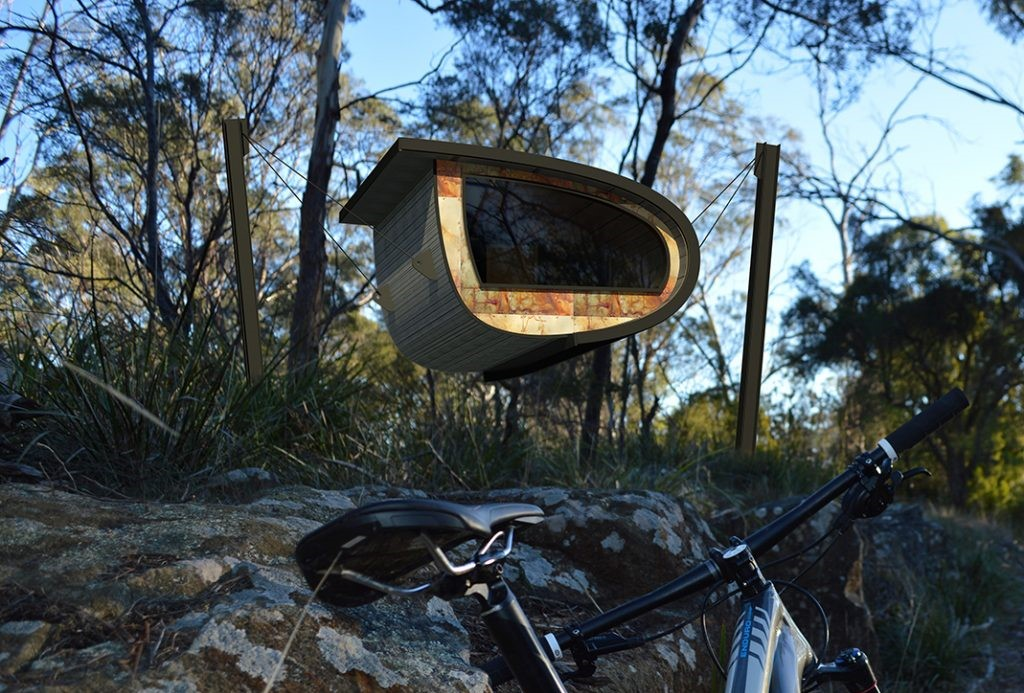
Blue Derby Pods Ride Experience

Since 2015, Derby has undergone a significant economic and cultural transformation, re-emerging as a world-class mountain biking destination.

=== Development of trails ===
The revitalization began after the Dorset Council secured a $2.5 million grant from the federal government's Regional Development Australia Fund to invest in tourism infrastructure. This funding, combined with other investments, led to the creation of the Blue Derby Mountain Bike Trails network.

The initial 30 kilometres of trails opened in 2015, costing over $3 million. The network has since expanded to over 125 kilometres (78 mi) of purpose-built trails that wind through the surrounding temperate rainforest and rugged terrain. The trails cater to a wide range of skill levels, from beginner-friendly green trails to highly technical black diamond runs. Notable trails include the epic Blue Tier, which descends through diverse ecosystems, and the technical Detonate trail, which features challenging rock features. The success of the project also led to related developments, such as the Blue Derby Pods Ride, a luxury eco-tourism experience.

=== Economic impact and major events ===
The trail network's opening had an immediate and profound impact on Derby. The town, once in decline, became a bustling tourist destination, attracting an estimated 30,000 visitors annually. This influx spurred the opening of new businesses, including cafes, breweries, shuttle services, and accommodation providers.

Derby's international reputation was cemented when it began hosting rounds of the Enduro World Series (EWS), now known as the UCI Enduro World Cup. The town successfully hosted events in 2017, 2019, and 2023, drawing elite international riders and global media attention.

The rapid transformation has also led to some social friction, with tensions arising between the needs of the tourism industry and the traditional local economy, particularly forestry. The success in Derby has served as a model for other regional areas in Tasmania, inspiring similar trail developments near towns like St Helens and on the West Coast.

== Culture and events ==
=== Derby River Derby ===
For many years, Derby hosted the annual Derby River Derby, a popular community event held in October. The event featured a friendly race on the Ringarooma River where competitors used homemade or inflatable rafts. At its peak in 2008, the event attracted up to 1,000 participants and an audience of around 4,000 people from across Tasmania. The event was discontinued in 2018 due to a shortage of volunteers to organise it.

=== Landmarks ===
- Tin Dragon Interpretation Centre & Cafe: A museum and visitor centre detailing the area's tin mining history, with a particular focus on the experiences of Chinese miners.
- Derby Schoolhouse Museum: Housed in the original school building, the museum showcases local history and memorabilia.
- Derby Tunnel: A 600-metre-long (2,000 ft) tunnel excavated in the 1880s to divert the Cascade River for mining purposes, now a historical point of interest.
- Mt Paris Dam: An abandoned concrete arch dam located upstream from Derby, now a popular site for visitors.
