= Scottsdale, Tasmania =

Scottsdale
- Town
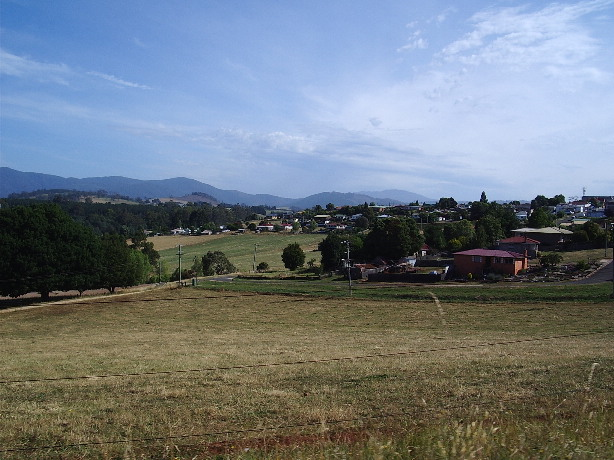
- Scottsdale, from North Scottsdale; Mount Barrow can be seen in the background

- Coordinates: 41°09′40″S 147°30′59″E
- Country: Australia
- State: Tasmania
- LGA: Dorset Council
- Location: 22 km (14 mi) from Bridport; 63 km (39 mi) from Launceston; 89 km (55 mi) from St Helens; 252 km (157 mi) from Hobart

Government
  - State electorate: Bass
  - Federal division: Bass
- Elevation: 198 m (650 ft)

Population
  - Total: 2,408 (2021)
- Postcode: 7260
- Mean max temp: 17.3 °C (63.1 °F)
- Mean min temp: 7.2 °C (45.0 °F)
- Annual rainfall: 971.6 mm (38.25 in)

Scottsdale is the largest town in north-east Tasmania, Australia, serving as the administrative and economic centre of the Dorset Council region. Located on the Tasman Highway, it connects Launceston to the east coast and acts as a key service hub for surrounding agricultural areas. The town has a strong historical association with potato and dairy farming, forestry, and poppy cultivation, industries that continue to support its economy. In recent years, Scottsdale has expanded into tourism, with attractions such as Barnbougle Dunes Golf Links and the Bridestowe Lavender Estate farm drawing visitors. It is also home to the Defence Science and Technology Group's nutrition research facility.

Scottsdale is part of the federal Division of Bass and the state electoral division of the same name. According to the 2021 Australian census, Scottsdale had a population of 2,408 residents.

== History ==
Scottsdale was first surveyed in 1855 and was noted by surveyor James Reid Scott for its fertile soils and mild climate. The area developed into an agricultural hub, with initial land selections occurring in 1859. The town was originally named Ellesmere before being renamed Scottsdale in 1893.

== Economy ==
Scottsdale has long been an agricultural centre, with key industries including potato and dairy farming, forestry, poppy cultivation, and mining. The town has experienced economic diversification, with tourism playing an increasing role in its development. Government investment in infrastructure and small business incentives has contributed to Scottsdale's regional growth.

The Defence Science and Technology Group operates a nutrition research facility in Scottsdale, originally established in 1958 and redeveloped in 2014.

Scottsdale's tourism sector has benefited from attractions such as Barnbougle Dunes Golf Links and the Bridestowe Estate Lavender Farm. The decline of the local timber industry has led to job losses, prompting local initiatives to attract new industries and retrain workers.

== Culture ==
Scottsdale has a strong community focus, with local sporting clubs, agricultural shows, and cultural events contributing to its identity. The town supports a range of sports, including Australian rules football, golf, and netball. The Scottsdale Art Gallery Café and other local venues promote regional artists and performers.

=== Forest Eco Centre ===
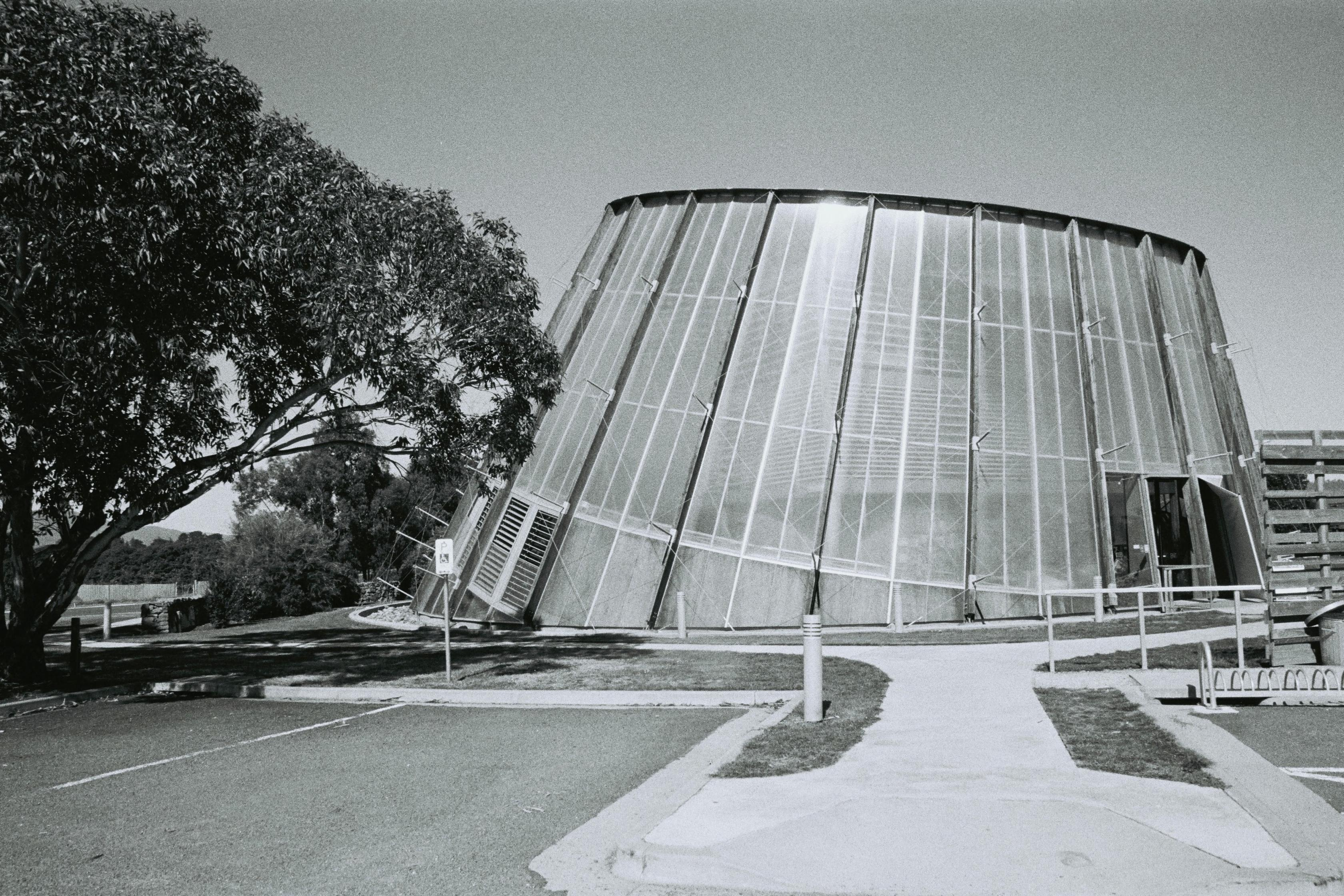
Forest Eco Centre, designed by Morris-Nunn and Associates, c. 2007

Forest Ecocentre, Scottsdale 2026

Constructed in the late 1990s, the Forest Eco Centre was a visitor facility intended to educate the public about Tasmania’s forestry industry. Designed by award-winning Hobart architect Robert Morris-Nunn, the centre featured a distinctive conical form engineered to maximise passive heating and cooling. A central thermal chimney was used to regulate airflow and internal temperature. The building housed offices for Forestry Tasmania, along with a café and a gift shop featuring locally produced timber products.

Despite its architectural significance, the centre closed in 2014 following the emergence of structural issues, including water ingress that created electrical safety hazards. In 2022, plans were announced to redevelop the site as accommodation comprising self-contained units and dormitory-style rooms for seasonal workers, tourists and mountain biking visitors, however these plans did not eventuate.

=== The "Big Thumb" ===
Janoschka's Thumb

Scottsdale resident Joshie Janoschka (1947–2004), who was born in Wilhelmshaven, Germany, and lived in the Springfield–Scottsdale area for 20 years, carved this hand with its extended thumb from the trunk of a fallen tree rather than cut it up for firewood. He gave no reason or meaning for the object; and though it was created in the era of "thumbing a ride", it is now referred to as "thumbs up", a sign of approval, and counted as one of Australia's "big things".

== Demographics ==
Historical population
Year	Pop.	±%
1954	3,100	—
2001	1,900	−38.7%
2006	1,950	+2.6%
2011	2,100	+7.7%
2016	2,250	+7.1%
2021	2,408	+7.0%
Source: Australian Bureau of Statistics data.

In the 2021 Australian census, Scottsdale recorded a population of 2,408 people.

The majority of residents (84.5%) were born in Australia, with small migrant communities from England (3.2%), New Zealand (1.1%), and the Philippines (0.7%). English is the dominant language spoken at home by 91.4% of residents, while other languages spoken include Mandarin (0.5%), Italian (0.4%), and Tagalog (0.3%).

The median weekly household income in Scottsdale is $1,150, which is below the national median of $1,746. Approximately 27.3% of households report a weekly income below $650, while 8.9% earn more than $3,000 per week.

Christianity remains the most commonly practiced religion, with 49.2% of residents identifying with a Christian denomination, including Anglicanism (18.5%) and Catholicism (16.4%). 42.8% of residents reported having no religious affiliation, reflecting broader secular trends in Tasmania.

== Climate ==
Scottsdale has an oceanic climate (Köppen: Cfb), with very mild, relatively dry summers and cool, wet winters. Average maxima vary from 23.0 °C (73.4 °F) in January and February to 12.0 °C (53.6 °F) in July while average minima fluctuate between 11.3 °C (52.3 °F) in February and 3.8 °C (38.8 °F) in July. Mean average annual precipitation is moderate, 971.6 mm (38.25 in) spread between 151.8 precipitation days, and is concentrated in winter. The town is not very sunny, with 165.9 cloudy days and only 68.0 clear days per annum. Extreme temperatures have ranged from 37.7 °C (99.9 °F) on 30 January 2009 to −4.7 °C (23.5 °F) on 6 August 1974.

Climate data for Scottsdale (41º10'12"S, 147º29'24"E, 198 m AMSL) (1971–2024 normals and extremes)
Month	Jan	Feb	Mar	Apr	May	Jun	Jul	Aug	Sep	Oct	Nov	Dec	Year
Record high °C (°F)	37.7 (99.9)	35.9 (96.6)	32.6 (90.7)	26.5 (79.7)	22.3 (72.1)	18.2 (64.8)	17.9 (64.2)	18.9 (66.0)	22.8 (73.0)	27.1 (80.8)	31.3 (88.3)	35.3 (95.5)	37.7 (99.9)
Mean daily maximum °C (°F)	23.0 (73.4)	23.0 (73.4)	21.3 (70.3)	17.9 (64.2)	14.8 (58.6)	12.6 (54.7)	12.0 (53.6)	12.6 (54.7)	14.3 (57.7)	16.5 (61.7)	18.9 (66.0)	20.9 (69.6)	17.3 (63.2)
Mean daily minimum °C (°F)	11.0 (51.8)	11.3 (52.3)	10.1 (50.2)	8.0 (46.4)	5.9 (42.6)	4.3 (39.7)	3.8 (38.8)	4.0 (39.2)	4.8 (40.6)	5.9 (42.6)	7.9 (46.2)	9.4 (48.9)	7.2 (44.9)
Record low °C (°F)	2.2 (36.0)	1.4 (34.5)	−0.8 (30.6)	−2.8 (27.0)	−2.0 (28.4)	−3.3 (26.1)	−3.8 (25.2)	−4.7 (23.5)	−2.8 (27.0)	−2.6 (27.3)	−0.6 (30.9)	0.4 (32.7)	−4.7 (23.5)
Average precipitation mm (inches)	57.4 (2.26)	40.7 (1.60)	56.5 (2.22)	77.5 (3.05)	94.5 (3.72)	103.2 (4.06)	118.5 (4.67)	116.1 (4.57)	92.2 (3.63)	83.3 (3.28)	67.3 (2.65)	64.7 (2.55)	971.6 (38.25)
Average precipitation days (≥ 0.2 mm)	8.9	8.2	9.6	11.6	13.4	13.8	15.8	16.9	15.6	14.3	12.2	11.5	151.8
Average afternoon relative humidity (%)	53	54	55	63	68	71	70	67	65	61	60	56	62
Average dew point °C (°F)	10.8 (51.4)	11.3 (52.3)	10.2 (50.4)	9.1 (48.4)	7.6 (45.7)	6.1 (43.0)	5.3 (41.5)	4.9 (40.8)	5.9 (42.6)	7.2 (45.0)	8.9 (48.0)	9.7 (49.5)	8.1 (46.6)
Mean monthly sunshine hours	263.5	231.7	217.0	180.0	148.8	132.0	136.4	164.3	174.0	223.2	231.0	251.1	2,353
Percentage possible sunshine	58	60	57	56	49	47	46	50	49	55	53	54	53
Source: Bureau of Meteorology (1971–2024 normals and extremes)

== Access ==
Scottsdale is connected to Tasmania's road network primarily via the Tasman Highway, which links the town to Launceston to the west and the north-east coast, including Bridport and St Helens. The Bridport Road provides a direct route to Bridport, supporting regional transport and freight movements.

Public transport services are limited, with bus connections provided by local operators linking Scottsdale to Launceston and surrounding towns. The town is serviced by the North East Bus Service, which operates passenger routes to Launceston and other regional destinations.

Historically, Scottsdale was connected to Tasmania's rail network via the North-East Tasmania Rail Line, which operated between Launceston and Herrick. The railway played a crucial role in supporting the town's timber and agricultural industries but was decommissioned in the early 2000s. Some sections of the former rail corridor have been repurposed into recreational cycling and walking trails, including the North East Rail Trail, which extends from Scottsdale towards Billycock Hill, attracting cyclists and tourists to the region.

The town's road infrastructure has been progressively upgraded to accommodate increasing freight and tourism traffic, with improvements made to the Tasman Highway and surrounding routes to enhance safety and accessibility.

== Notable people ==
=== Architecture ===
- Margaret Findlay (1916–2007), architect; the first woman in Tasmania to qualify as an associate of the Royal Australian Institute of Architects (RAIA).

=== Arts and media ===
- Keith Adams (1926–2012), filmmaker and adventurer known for his 1956 film Northern Safari.

=== Politics ===
- Tania Rattray, independent member of the Tasmanian Legislative Council for the division of McIntyre.
- Tony Rundle, former journalist and Premier of Tasmania from 1996 to 1998.

=== Sport ===
- Brian Booth (1924–2022), cricketer.
- Xavier Doherty, international cricketer.
- Thomas Rocher (1930–2018), cricketer.
- Trevor Ranson (1912–1996), VFL footballer.
- Ike Sellers (1905–1997), VFL footballer.
