= Hog Island (Tasmania) =

Island in Tasmania, Australia

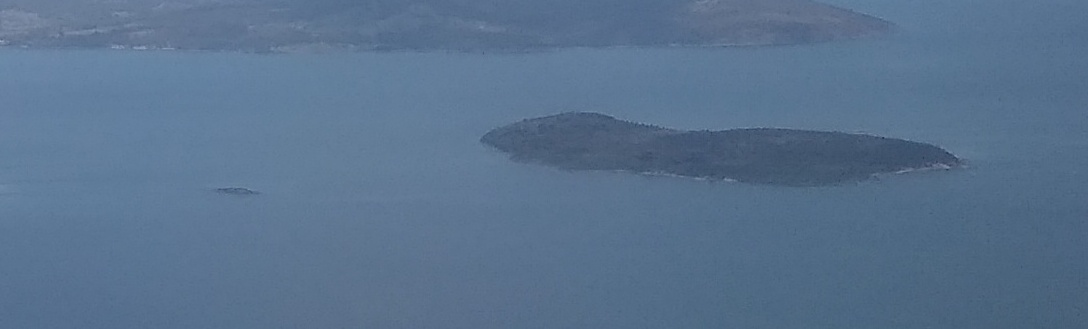
- Hog Island (left) and the nearby larger Sloping Island (right)

- Location within Tasmania

Geography
- Location: Frederick Henry Bay
- Coordinates: 42°56′24″S 147°39′00″E
- Archipelago: Sloping Island Group

Administration
- Australia
- State: Tasmania

Hog Island is a small islet and nature reserve, with an area of 0.35 hectares (0.86 acres), part of the Sloping Island Group, lying in the Frederick Henry Bay, close to the south-eastern coast of Tasmania, Australia. The island is situated around the Tasman and Forestier Peninsulas.

Recorded breeding seabird and wader species are Pacific gull, kelp gull, sooty oystercatcher and Caspian tern.

== See also ==
- List of islands of Tasmania
