= Smooth Island (Tasmania) =

Island close to the south-eastern coast of Tasmania

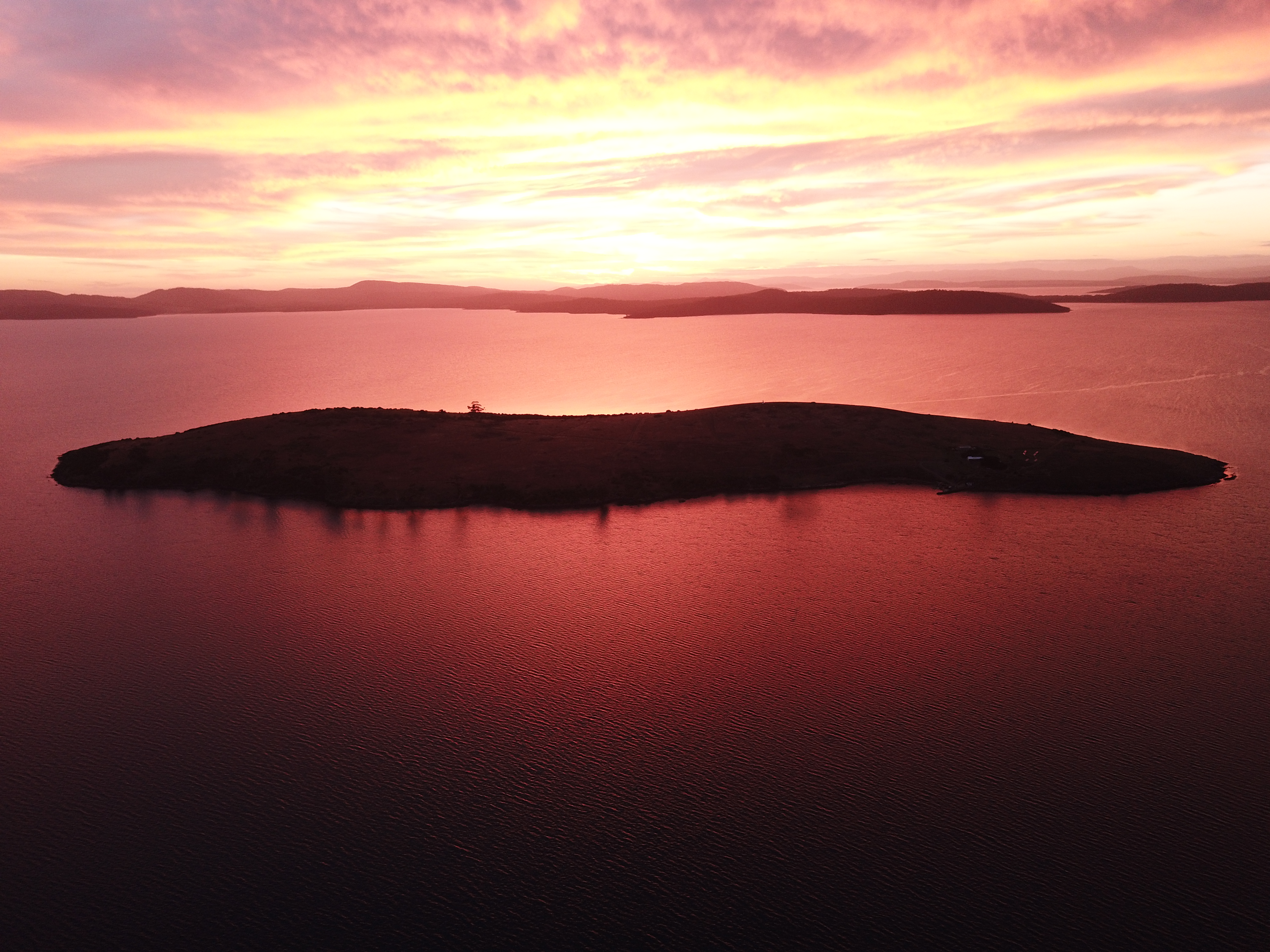
- Smooth Island sunset

- Location within Tasmania

Geography
- Location: Norfolk Bay
- Coordinates: 42°56′42″S 147°47′06″E
- Archipelago: Sloping Island Group
- Area: 59.31 ha (146.6 acres)
- Coastline: 3.38 km (2.1 mi)
- Highest elevation: 44 m (144 ft)

Administration
- Australia
- State: Tasmania

Additional information
- Time zone: AEST (UTC+10)

Smooth Island, is a privately owned island with an area of 59.31 ha (146.6 acres) lying close to the south-eastern coast of Tasmania, Australia. The island is part of the Sloping Island Group situated in Norfolk Bay and surrounded by the Tasman and Forestier Peninsulas. The towns Dunalley and Murdunna are nearby. Smooth Island differs from other Tasmanian islands as it has an unencumbered freehold title down to the high-water mark.

== Administration ==
For administrative purposes, the island is within the Tasman Council, the land district of Pembroke, the legislative council of Rumney and the electorate of Lyons at state and federal levels. It lies within the Fire Management Area Committee Boundary (FMAC) of 'East Coast'.

Smooth Island is privately owned; it has a freehold title with no covenants. In 2014 Smooth Island was gazetted as a Private Forest Timber Reserve. The coast line 200 m (660 ft) from the Smooth Island waterline has been classified Zone 23 (Environmental management) under the Tasman Interim Planning Scheme 2015.

=== Access ===
Smooth island is private property to the coastal high-water mark; unauthorised public access, including mooring of vessels, is prohibited. Subject to authorisation, Smooth Island is easily accessible by boat and helicopter. The island's terrain is suited to the construction of a small airstrip.

=== Services ===
The island receives radio coverage from ABC Local Radio (936 AM), 3G mobile phone coverage from Telstra and wireless coverage from the National Broadband Network. The table below outlines the nearest services and facilities to Smooth Island.

Service type	Name	Address	Coordinates	Distance by air	Distance by boat	Distance by road from Murdunna	Reference
Public boat ramp	Murdunna boat ramp	(Note: Sommers Bay Road, Murdunna, Tas 7173)	(Note: 42.945952°S 147.855128°E)	5.7 km	5.8 km	–	
Ambulance	Dodges Ferry Ambulance Station	(Note: Tiger Head Rd, Dodges Ferry, Tas 7173)	(Note: 42.857603°S 147.611366°E)	17 km	21 km	28 km	
Medical (family doctor)	Dodges Ferry Medical	(Note: 52 Carlton Beach Rd, Dodges Ferry, Tas 7173)	(Note: 42.857818°S 147.617753°E)	17 km	21 km	28 km	
Major hospital	Royal Hobart Hospital	(Note: 48 Liverpool St, Hobart, Tas 7000)	(Note: 42.879905°S 147.329534°E)	37.5 km	56 km	65 km	
Police (and defibrillator)	Dunalley Police Station	(Note: 126 Arthur Hwy, Dunalley, Tas 7177)	(Note: 42.887223°S 147.810238°E)	6.7 km	6.7 km	9 km	
Mobile phone transmission tower	Telstra 3G 850 MHz	(Note: 17 Constance St, Dunalley, Tas 7177)	(Note: 42.889719°S 147.805765°E)	6 km	–	–	
Wireless internet transmission tower	National Broadband Network			6 km	–	–	
Fuel	Shell Dunalley	(Note: 119 Arthur Hwy, Dunalley, Tas 7177)	(Note: 42.887226°S 147.812031°E)	6.5 km	6.5 km	9 km	
General store	Dunalley Supermarket	(Note: 168 Arthur Hwy, Dunalley, Tas 7177)	(Note: 42.889480°S 147.806124°E)	6.7 km	6.7 km	9 km	
Large shopping centre	Sorell plaza shopping centre	(Note: Cole Street, Sorell, Tas 7172)	(Note: 42.782389°S 147.566468°E)	25 km	29 km	40 km	

=== Recreational fishing ===
"All waters 200 metres seaward from the low water mark of Smooth Island: Shark Refuge Area. No taking of shark, skates or rays, except elephantfish. Where permitted, graball nets must not be set for more than 2 hours and can only be set from sunrise until one hour before sunset. No mullet nets. No set lines (ong lines and drop lines)."

== Geography ==
Smooth Island lies 2.24 km (1.39 mi) from both Dunbabin Point and Chronicle Point on the mainland, and 2.3 km (1.4 mi) from King George Island, measured from the nearest coastlines.

The island has two hilly peaks separated by a saddle. (Note: North Peak: 42.9444°S 147.78219°E. South Peak:42.94877°S 147.7862°E. Saddle: 42.9461°S 147.78472°E) The height above sea level of the North peak, South peak and saddle are 43 m (141 ft), 40 m (130 ft) and 30 m (98 ft) respectively. (Note: Measured on 30 December 2015 using barometric function of Garmin Monterra. Sea level calibrated to 0 metres when tide was at 1.11 m (3 ft 8 in). After the first set of measurements the device was recalibrated to sea level (−7 cm (−2.8 in)) and the altitude of the three features was reassessed, increasing the altitude of all points by 1 m (3 ft 3 in). It is the second set of measurements which have been recorded. Conditions: pressure 1,015.4 hPa (14.727 psi), humidity 53%, 20.4 km (12.7 mi) NE wind, no rain, dew point 12.7 °C (54.9 °F).) (Note: Other data suggests the north peak is 39.95m above sea level, and south peak 36.81m above sea level. See this link for evidence.)

=== Climate ===
See here for live data from Smooth Island's Weather Station.

=== Geology ===
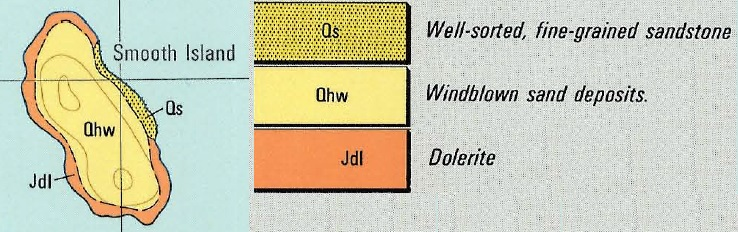
Smooth Island geological survey

Smooth Island consists of diabase or dolerite rock, a subvolcanic intrusion that probably occurred from 56 to 33.9 million years ago during the Eocene epoch of the Cenozoic era. A geological survey identified consolidated, brownish, fine-grained quartz sandstone occurring on the island's north-east coastline at approximately 2 m (6.6 ft) above sea level, covered by sand. It was said to be similar to the sandstone samples retrieved from South Arm that contained numerous fossils but no fossils were found in the samples taken from Smooth Island. The western aspect of the island contains dolerite (tholeiitic) with locally developed granophyre from the Jurassic period. The water table is classified as a surficial sediment aquifer (porous media – unconsolidated).

Because the island predominantly has a sloping hard rock shore, there is little vulnerability to flooding or erosion due to a rise in sea level. A coastal acid sulfate soil analysis produced a result of "extremely low" along the north and north-east side of the island.

== Ecosystem ==
See here for an overview of Smooth Island's fauna and flora.

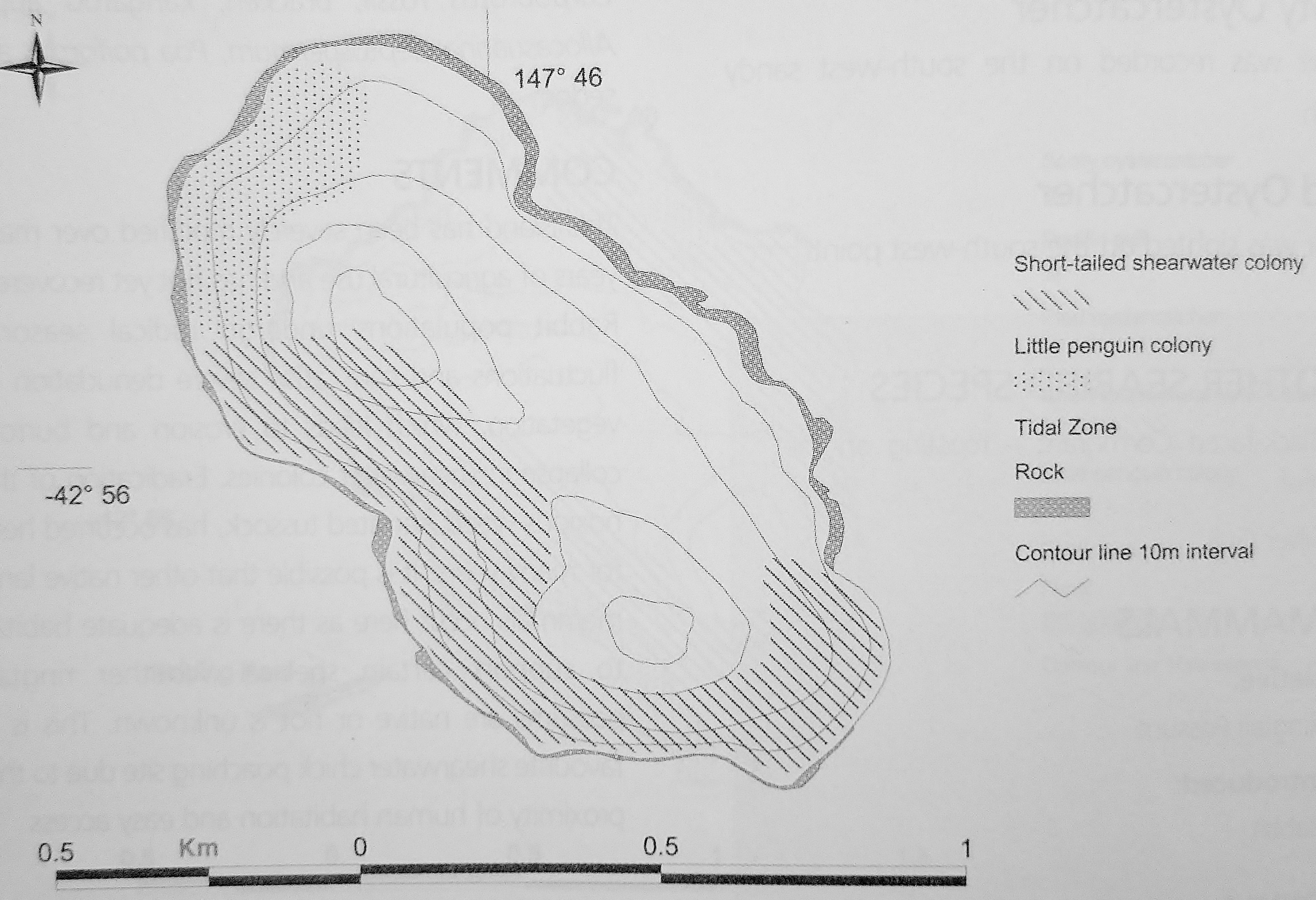
Short-tailed shearwater and little penguin colonies, Smooth Island.

=== Marine ecology ===
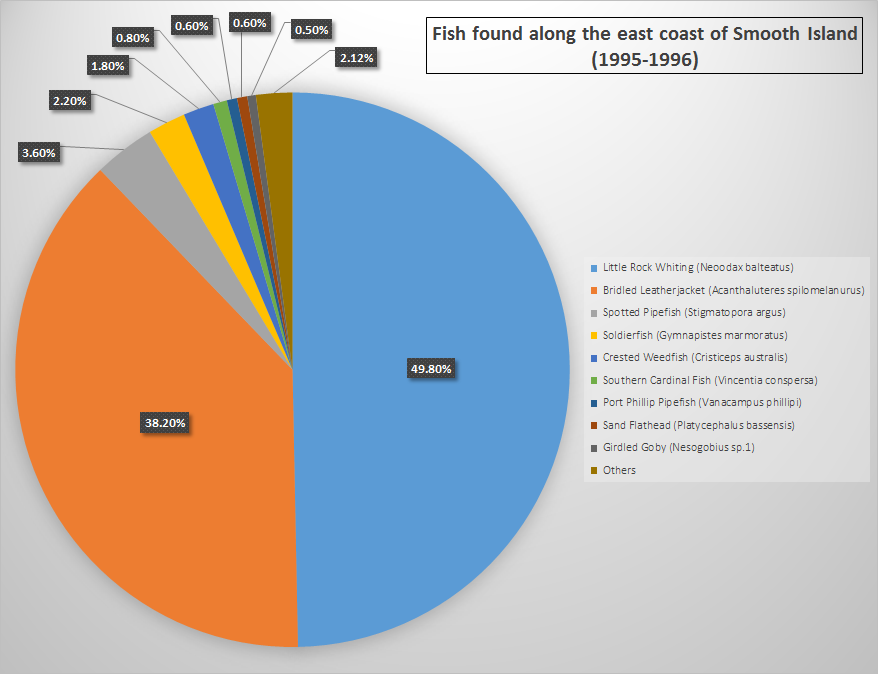
Pie chart depicting the types of fish found along the east coast of Smooth island between 1995 and 1996

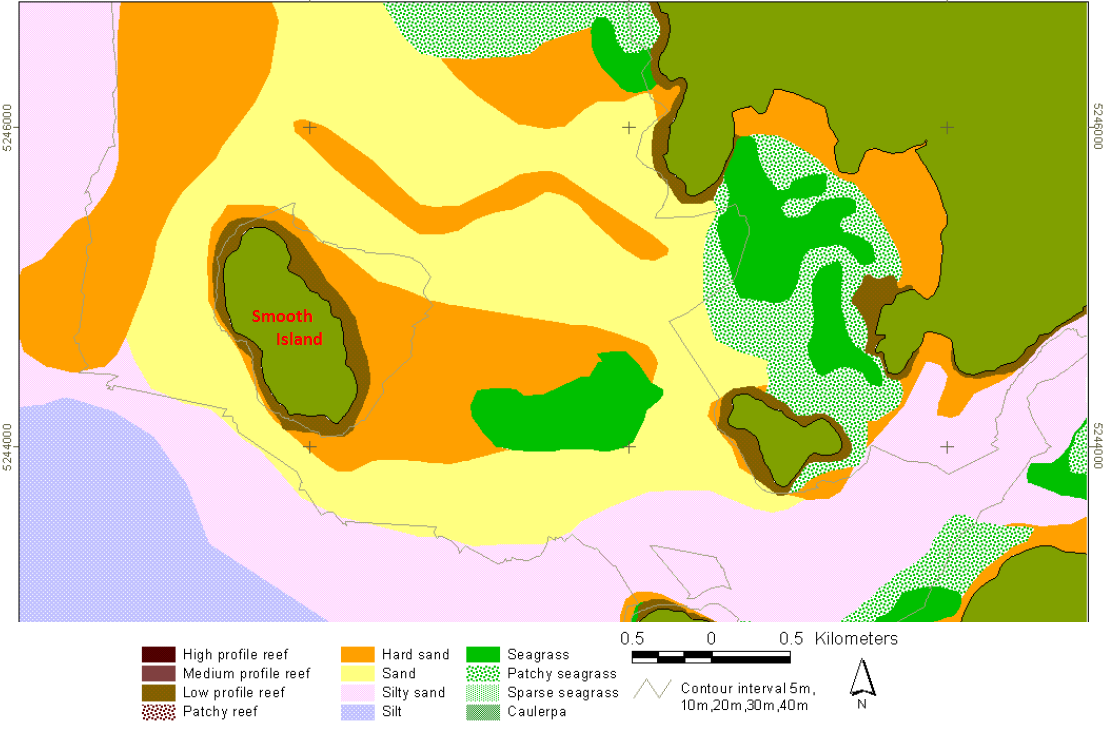
The marine habitat of Smooth Island

Smooth Island is surrounded by a low-profile reef. A region of gravel or hard sand extends from the reef on the eastern coast towards King George Island and King George Sound. The reef on the western coast is surrounded by sand and a body of silt approaches the south-west coast of the island. Between Smooth Island and King George Island lies a dense bed of seagrass (Halophila australis) and eelgrass (Zostera tasmanica) covering about 12.5 ha (31 acres). Studies have found dense populations of South Australian cobbler (Gymnapistes marmoratus) within this region because this fish prefers patchy beds of eelgrass. The island's east coast has the densest concentration of Little weed whiting (Neoodax balteatus) in Norfolk Bay; an assessment in 1995–1996 revealed that 88% of the fish caught were of the species Little Rock Whiting (Neoodax balteatus) and Bridled Leatherjacket (Acanthaluteres spilomelanurus).

A species of red algae (Rhabdonia verticillata) has been found close to the island. The fish species flathead, trumpeter, perch, cod and Australian salmon can be found in the waters immediately surrounding the island. Dolphins are frequently sighted and killer whales (Orcinus orca) are infrequently sighted near the island. The Spotted handfish and the Live-bearing Seastar (Parvulastra vivipara) are threatened marine species that may be present in the waters surrounding Smooth Island. A killer whale was identified 1 km (0.62 miles) north-east of the current lighthouse position. Several humpback whales were spotted near Smooth Island in June 2017.

=== Ecological rehabilitation ===
The terrestrial ecosystem of Smooth Island has been damaged by overgrazing and slashing-and-burning, and through the commercial hunting of wildlife. The island's natural vegetation has been largely displaced by exotic grass, thistle, bracken, scattered eucalypts and African boxthorn bushes. Between 0.86 ha (2.1 acres) and 18 ha (44 acres) of shearwater rookeries are present on Smooth Island and the impact of repeated fires on these habitats has been studied. The island' current owners intend to systematically restore its native ecosystem. Since March 2014, a diverse range of native Tasmanian flora have been planted throughout the island. Remnant eucalypts are also expected to seed on the island's south-east coast since grazing has ceased. There are no EV's on the island.

== History ==
=== Toponymy ===
Matthew Flinders was the first to chart the island on 15 December 1798 and named it "Smooth Island" on his contemporaneous maps but the island does not appear on his 1814 map. In 1824 Thomas Scott referred to the island as "Garden Island" on his maps. The origins of this are not entirely clear, and other sources are inconclusive about the above assertions. and state that the island was first named on a map by "Cross (1830)" and "Frankland" (1837)", before stating several pages later that the island was first named "Smooth Island".

According to a 1911 newspaper article, the island "is not named in the map of D'Entrecasteaux, even though it was marked". During the early 21st century, Smooth Island was occasionally listed as "Lot 1 Norfolk Bay, Dunalley TAS 7177" on some real-estate classifieds.

Much confusion exists about the names of many of the islands in South East Tasmania. Garden Island has become an alternative name for both Green Island and Smooth Island. A newspaper article from 1836 refers to a Garden Island in the Pembroke Land District.

=== Structures ===
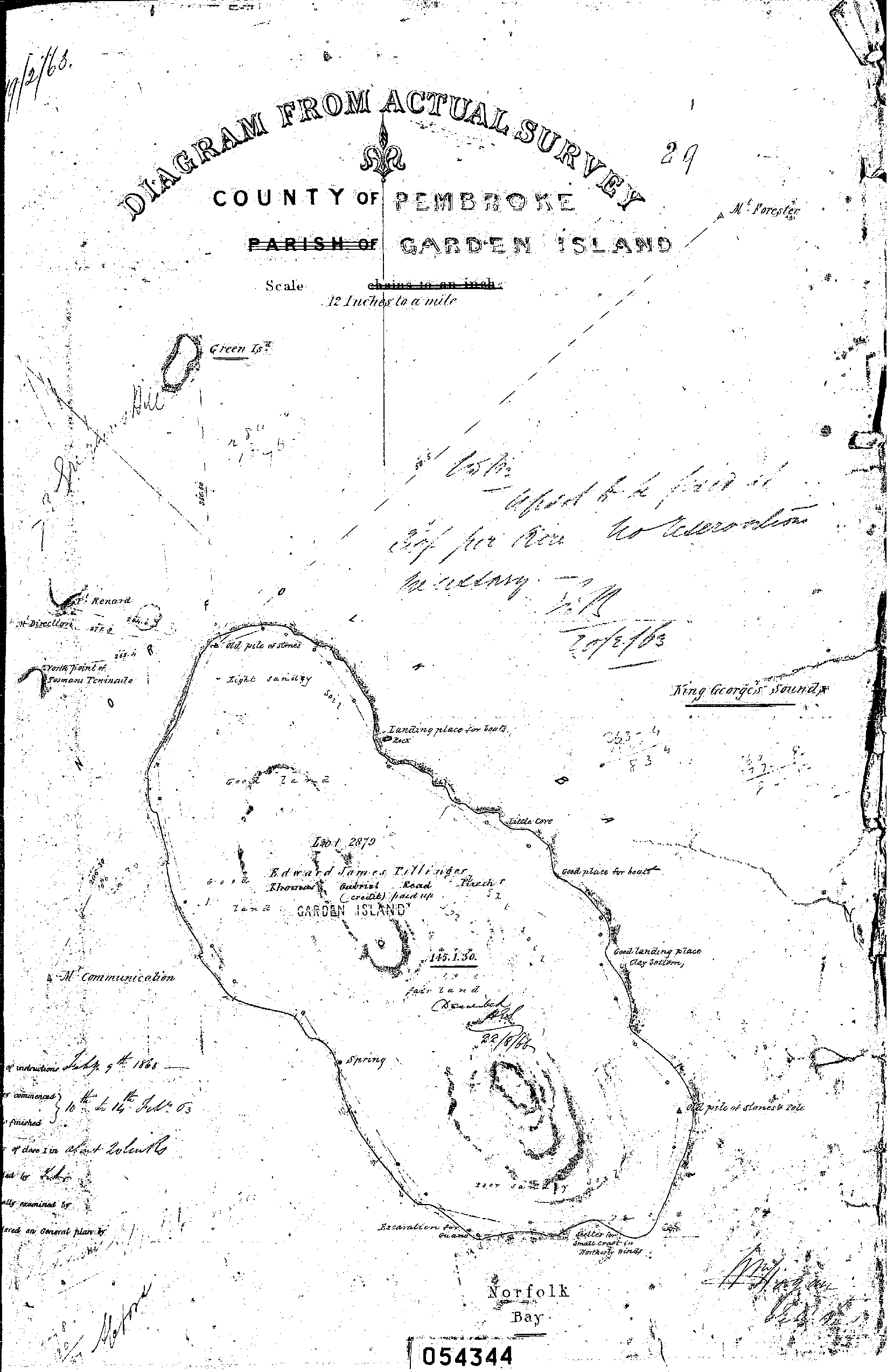
Formal survey of Smooth Island, 1863

A survey of Smooth Island was completed on 14 July 1863; it reveals the presence of the original jetty, a spring and a guano excavation site on the island. A lighthouse (K 3621.2) was installed on the north peak in 1991. It was relocated by request of the landowners in 2014. (Note: To the following location: 42.9399167°S 147.7812667°E) (Note: The specifications of the light remain unchanged since this relocation. Its height is 2 m (6 ft 7 in). The light's range was 6 nmi (11 km; 6.9 mi) in clear weather. It is a stainless steel pole in the water. The technical specifications of the lighthouse are: FL(3)W, period 6.1 seconds (i.e.: a cluster of 3 flashes of a white light is produced, which repeats every 6.1 seconds))

=== Potential uses ===
Smooth Island's south and west coasts have alkaline soil while the east slope has acidic soil. The crops with the greatest yield potential are as follows:

- Table wine grapes (Note: 'Highly suitable' area: Most of the west side of the island – in addition to the south east side (near the shack, north of Crap Rock). 'Suitable' area: The remainder of the island.)
- Sparkling wine grapes (Note: 'Highly suitable' area: Along a channel from the saddle to the south peak. 'Suitable' area: The remainder of the island.)
- Industrial hemp (Note: 'Highly suitable': A small patch at the very top of the north peak.)
- Pyrethrum
- Blueberries (Note: 'Highly suitable': isolated patches, and most of the rest of the island is classified as 'suitable'.)
- Phosphate mining: on 13 October 1941, the viability of mining phosphate on Smooth Island was assessed but was determined to not be viable.

== Artwork ==
Painting inspired by Smooth Island

Smooth Island has been the subject of several notable paintings: Amanda Davies X Marks the Spot (2022 Glover Prize Finalist), Robyn Harman's Smooth Island (2021), Michael Weitnauer's Norfolk Bay and Dale Frank's "Dunalley, Smooth Island". It has been mentioned in poems such as "Two Kinds of Silence" by Kathryn Lomer:

I could lose or find myself
in this private Bermuda triangle-
Connelly's Bay, Lime Bay, Smooth Island;

In the dusk Smooth Island's navigation light
begins to blink its code name
to sailors bound for Dunalley

== Gallery ==
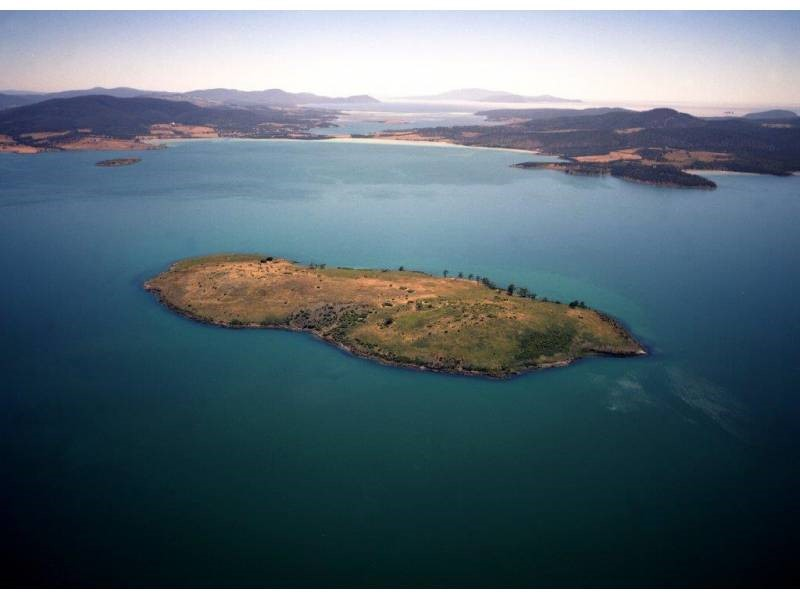

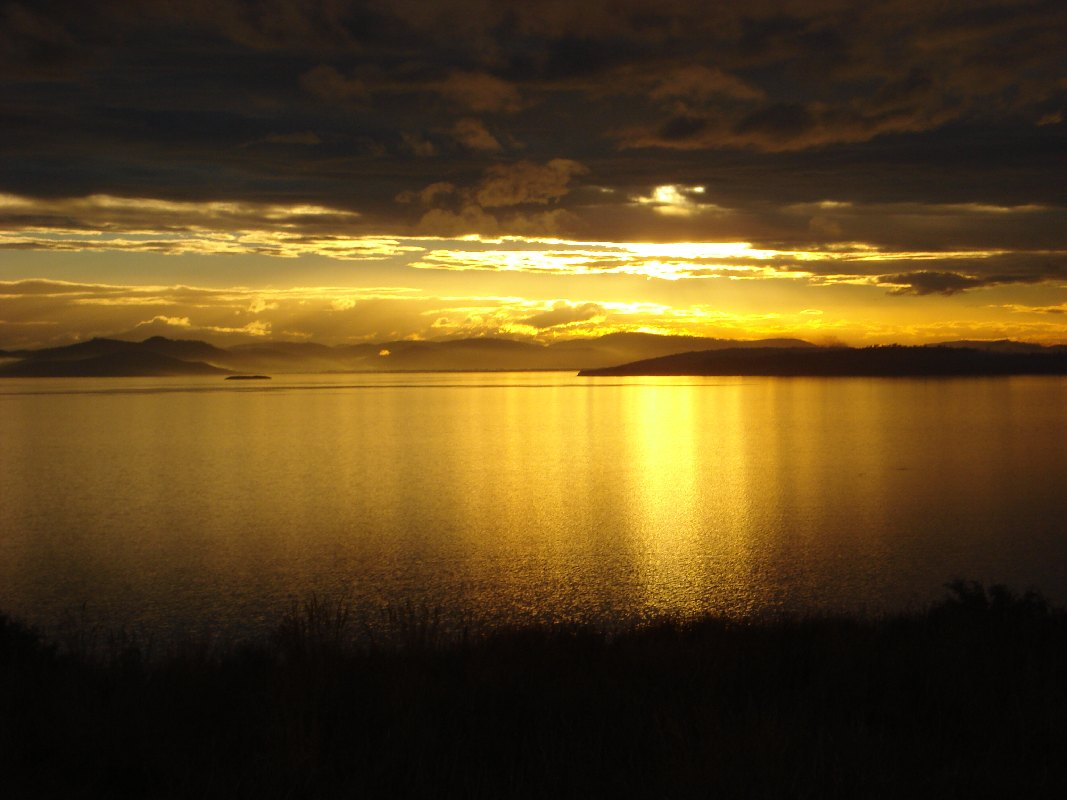

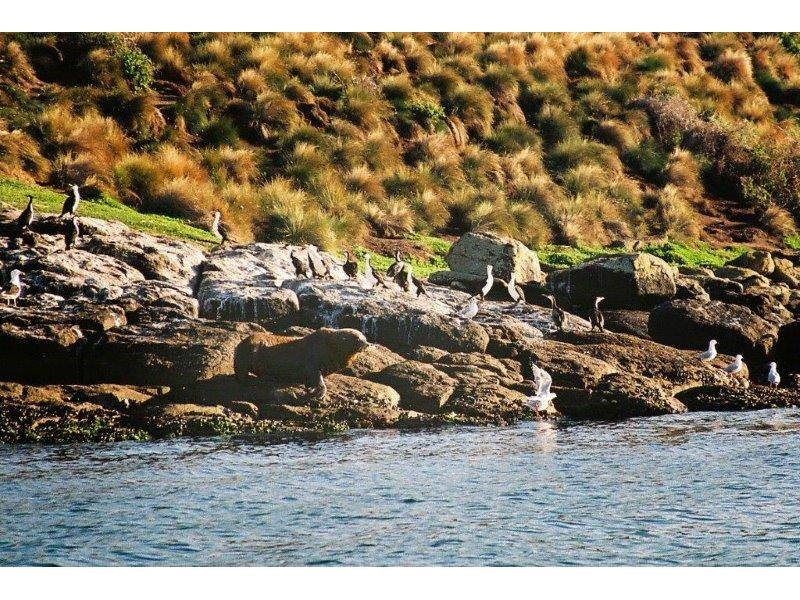

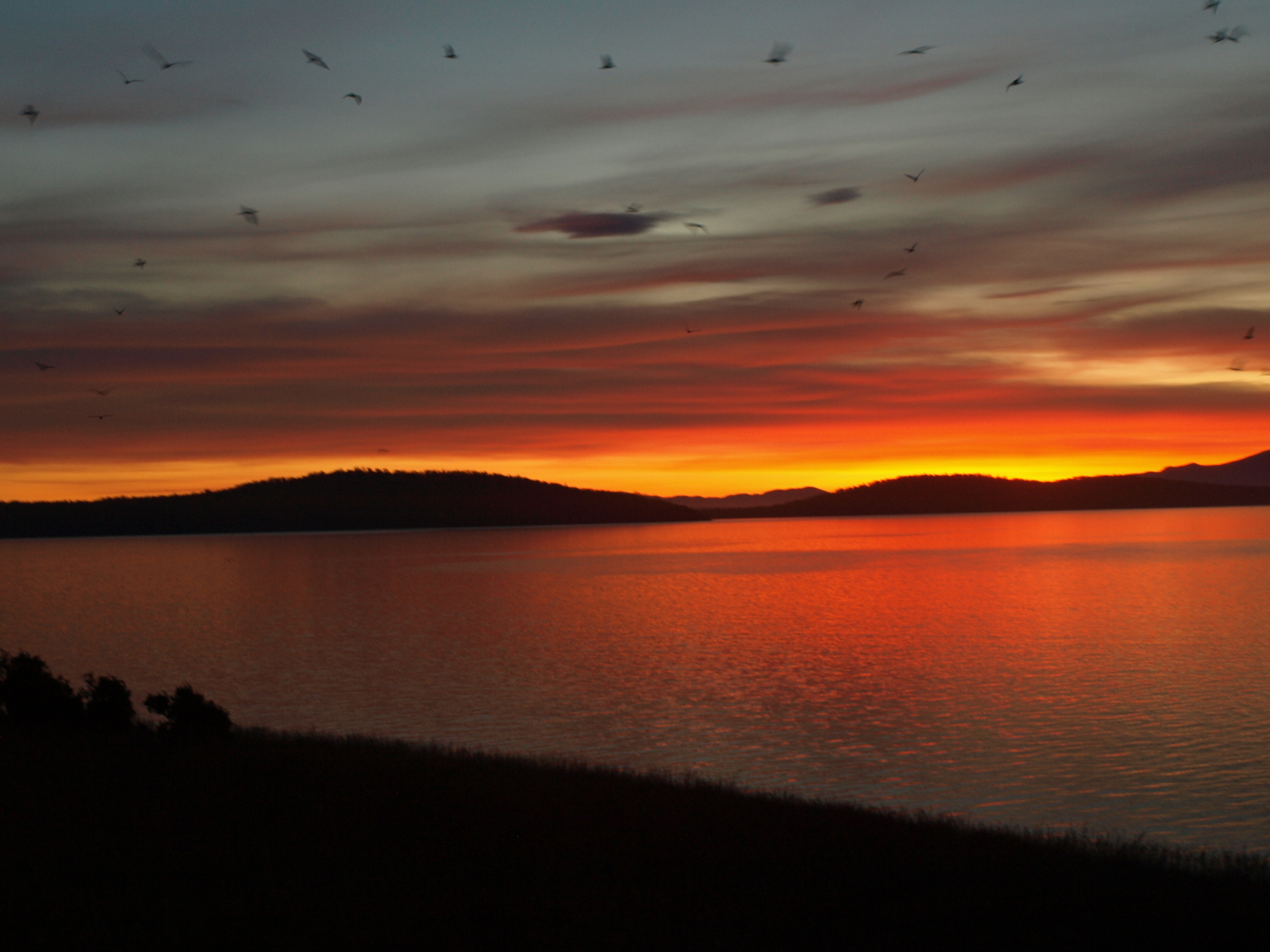

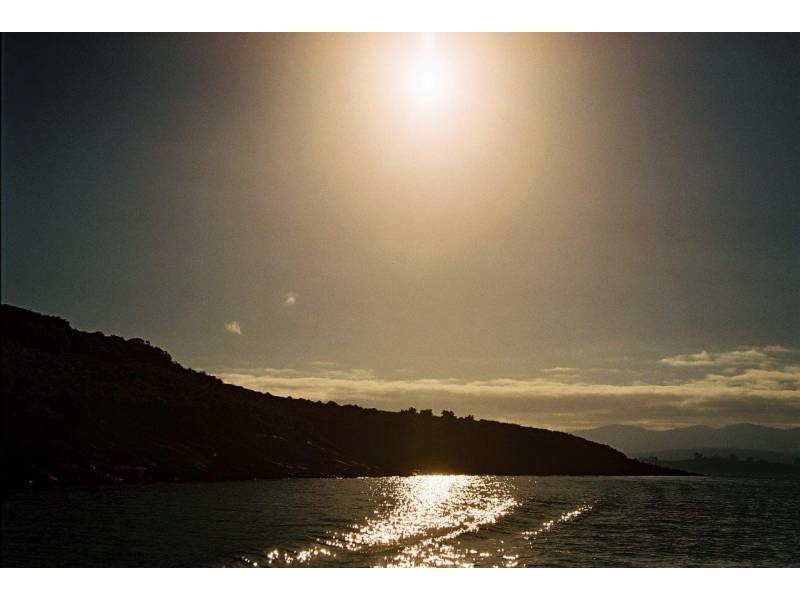

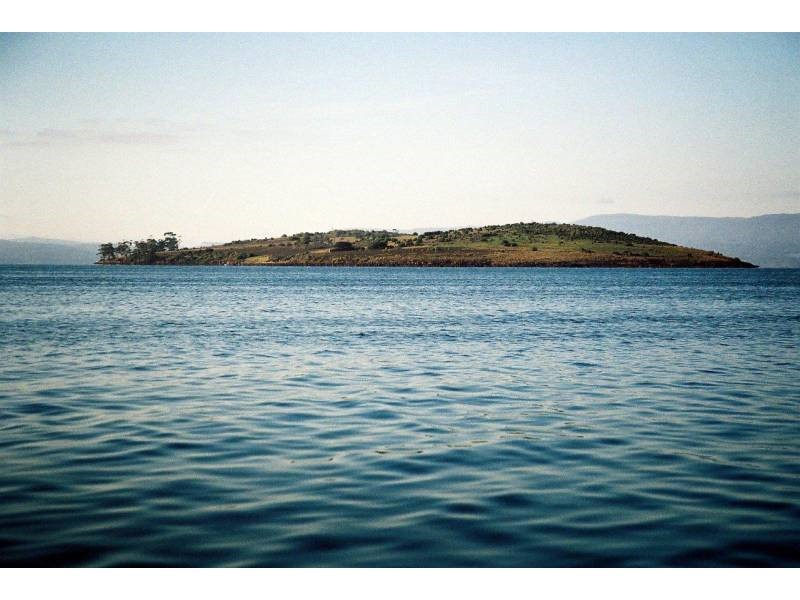

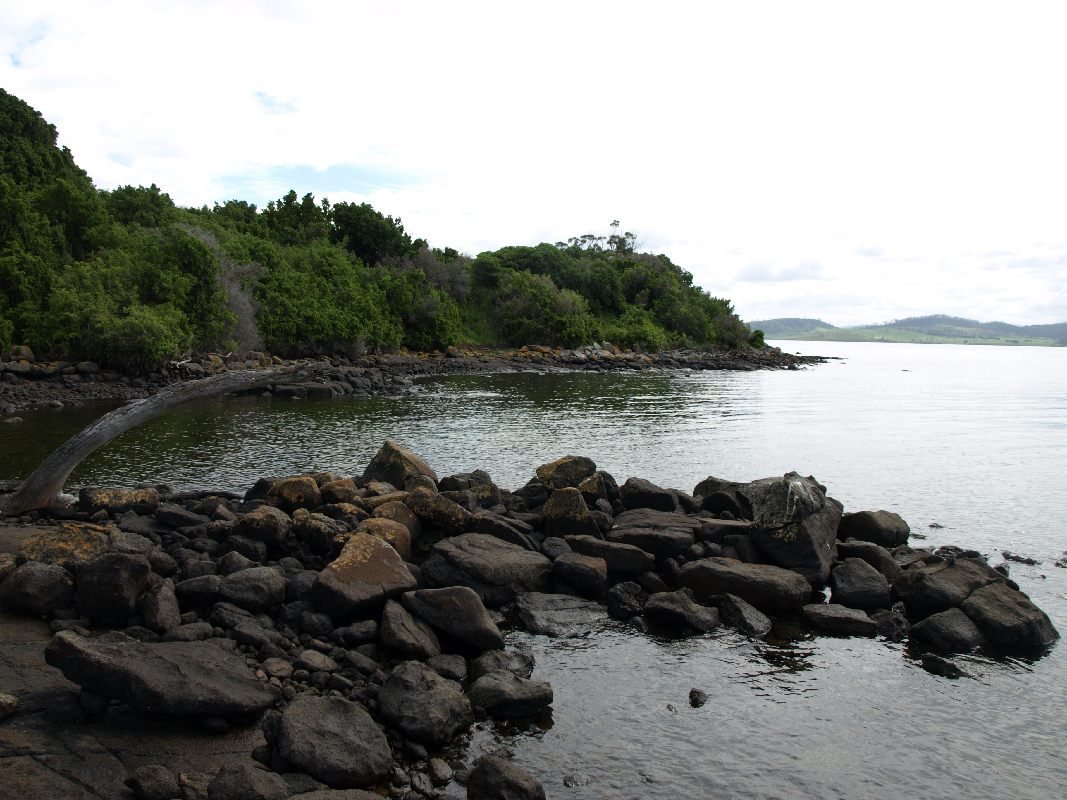

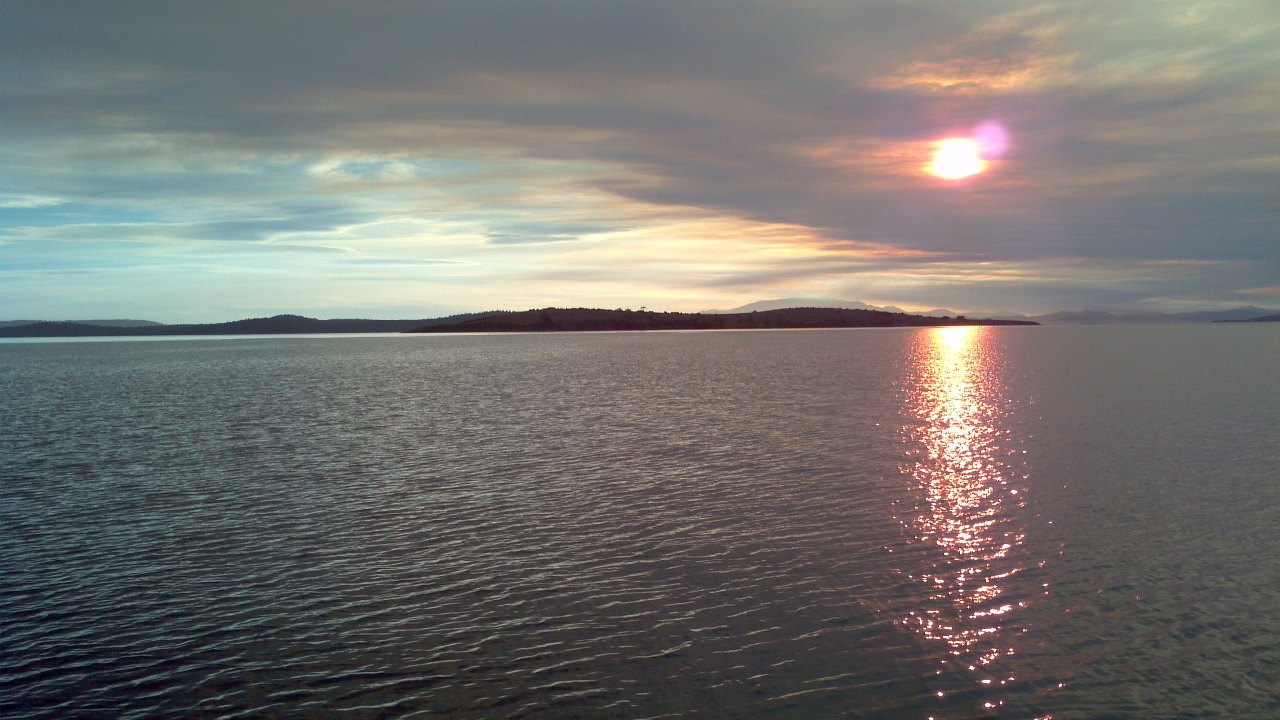

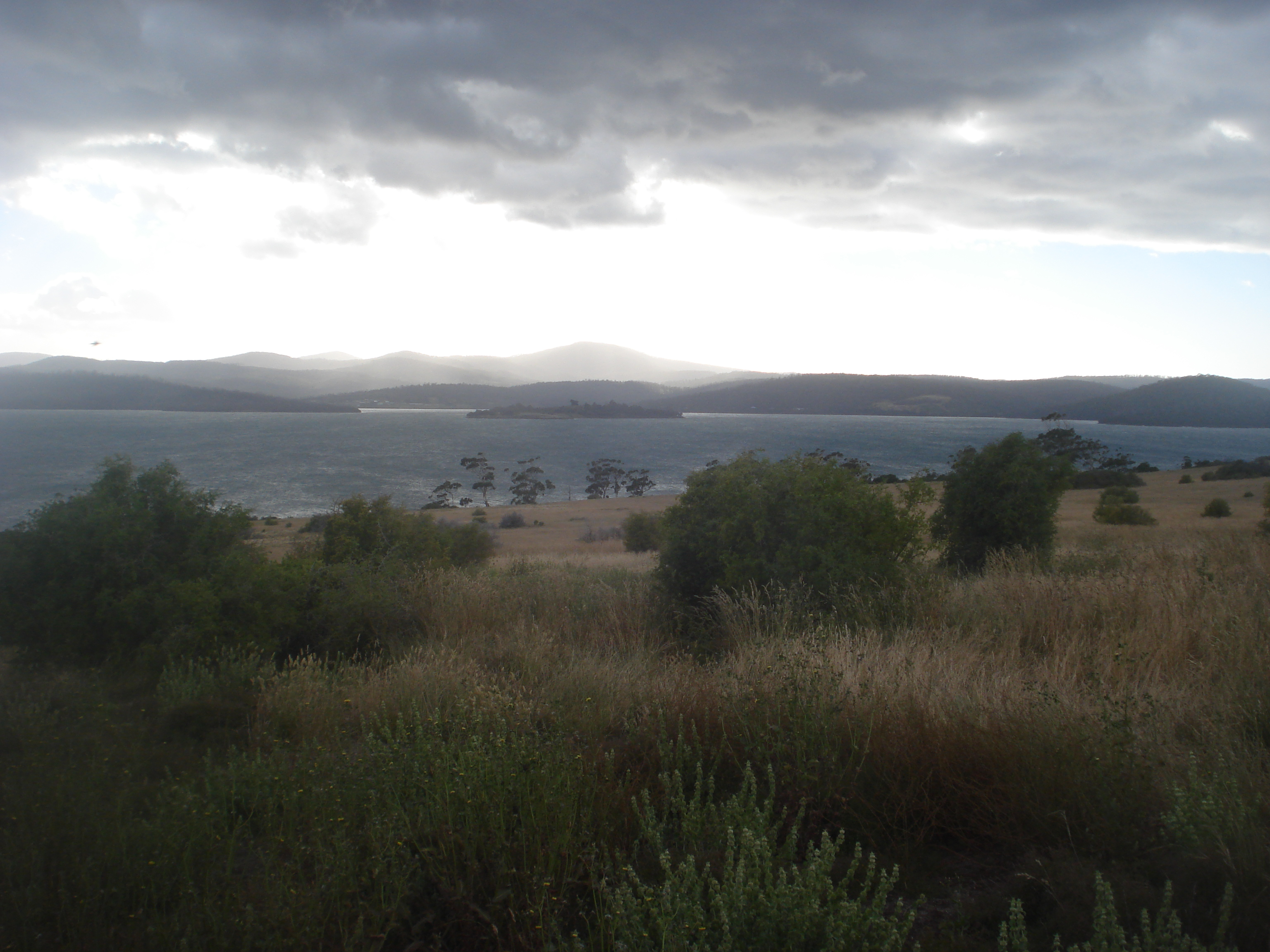

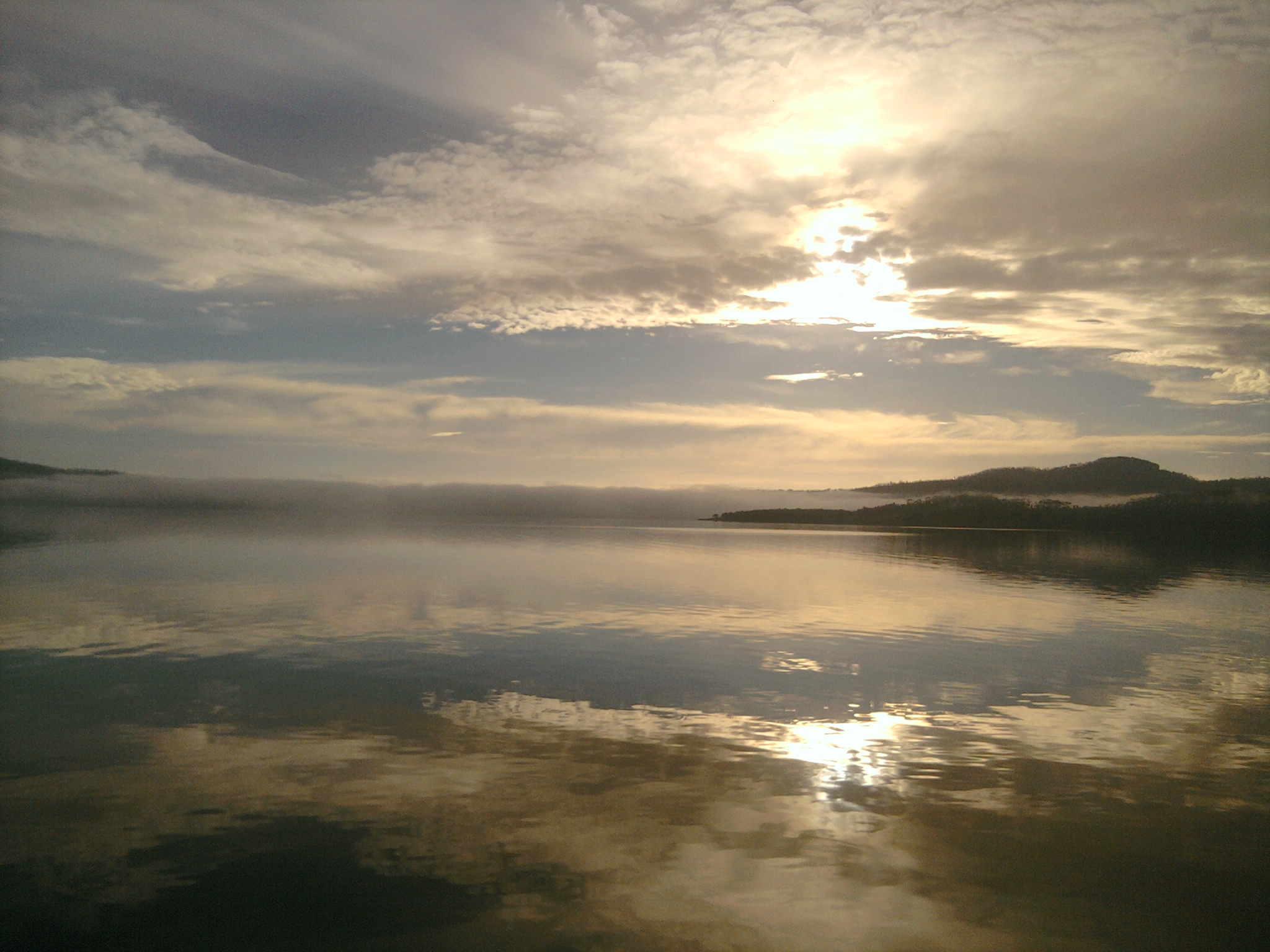

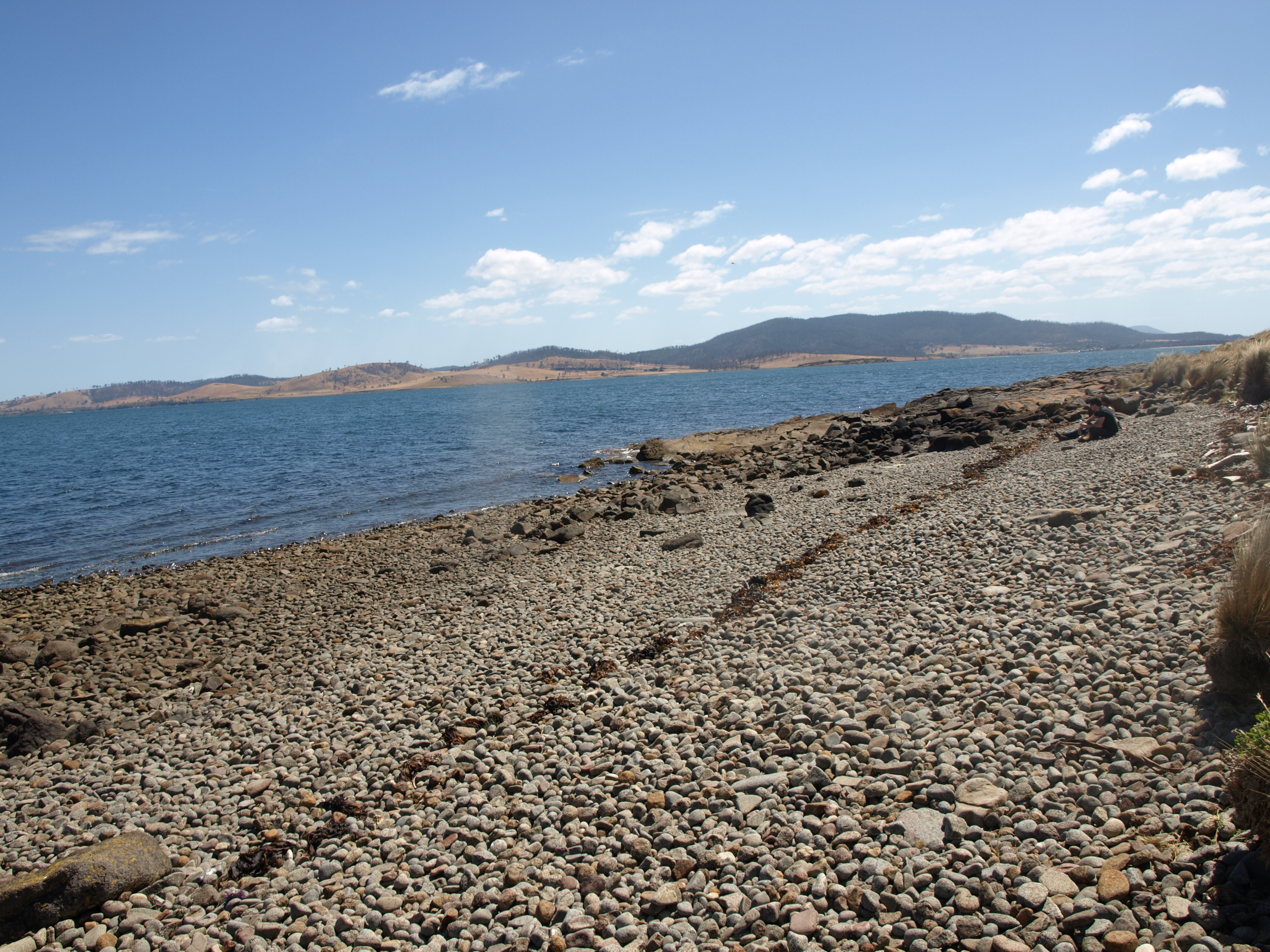

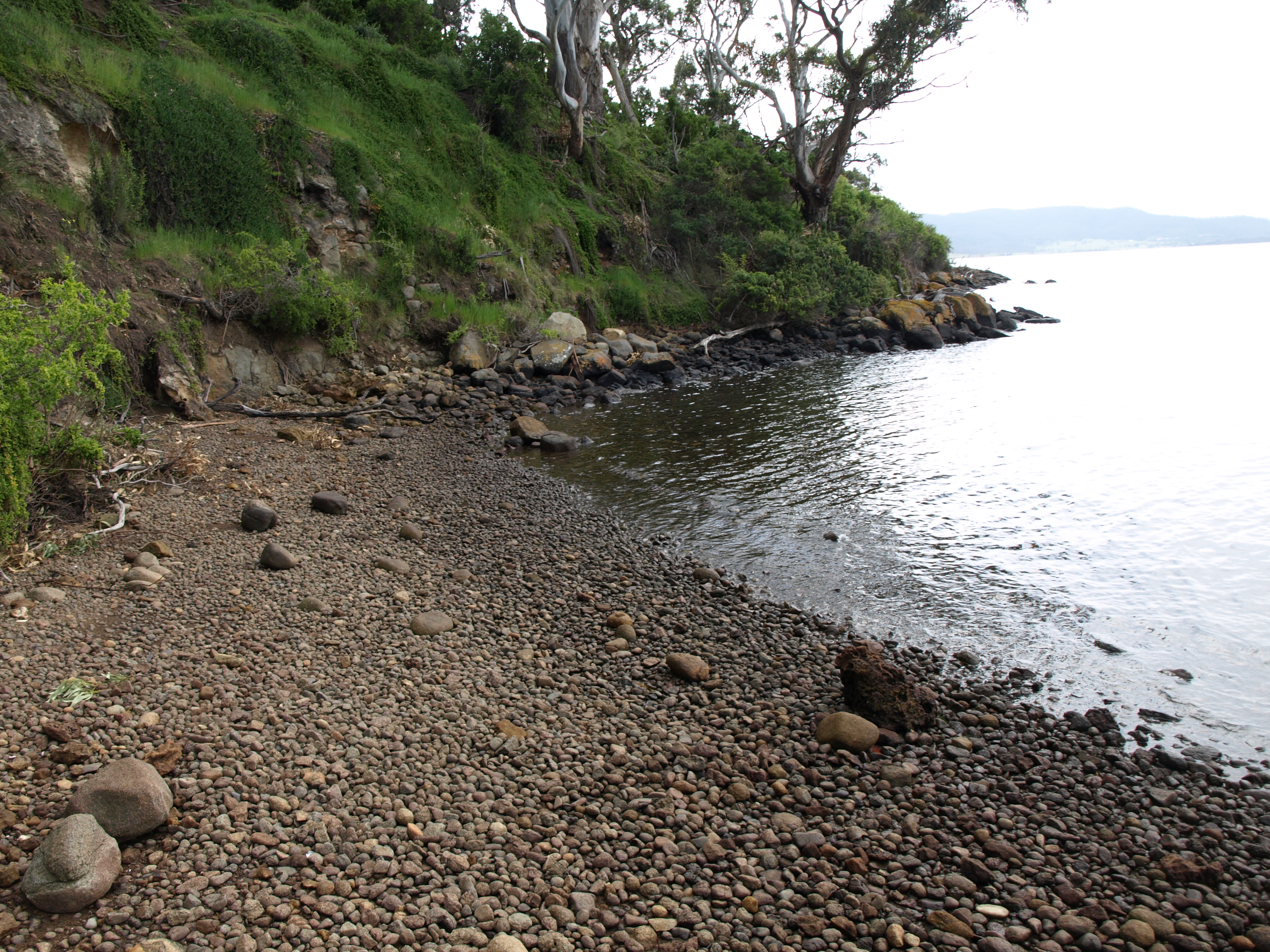

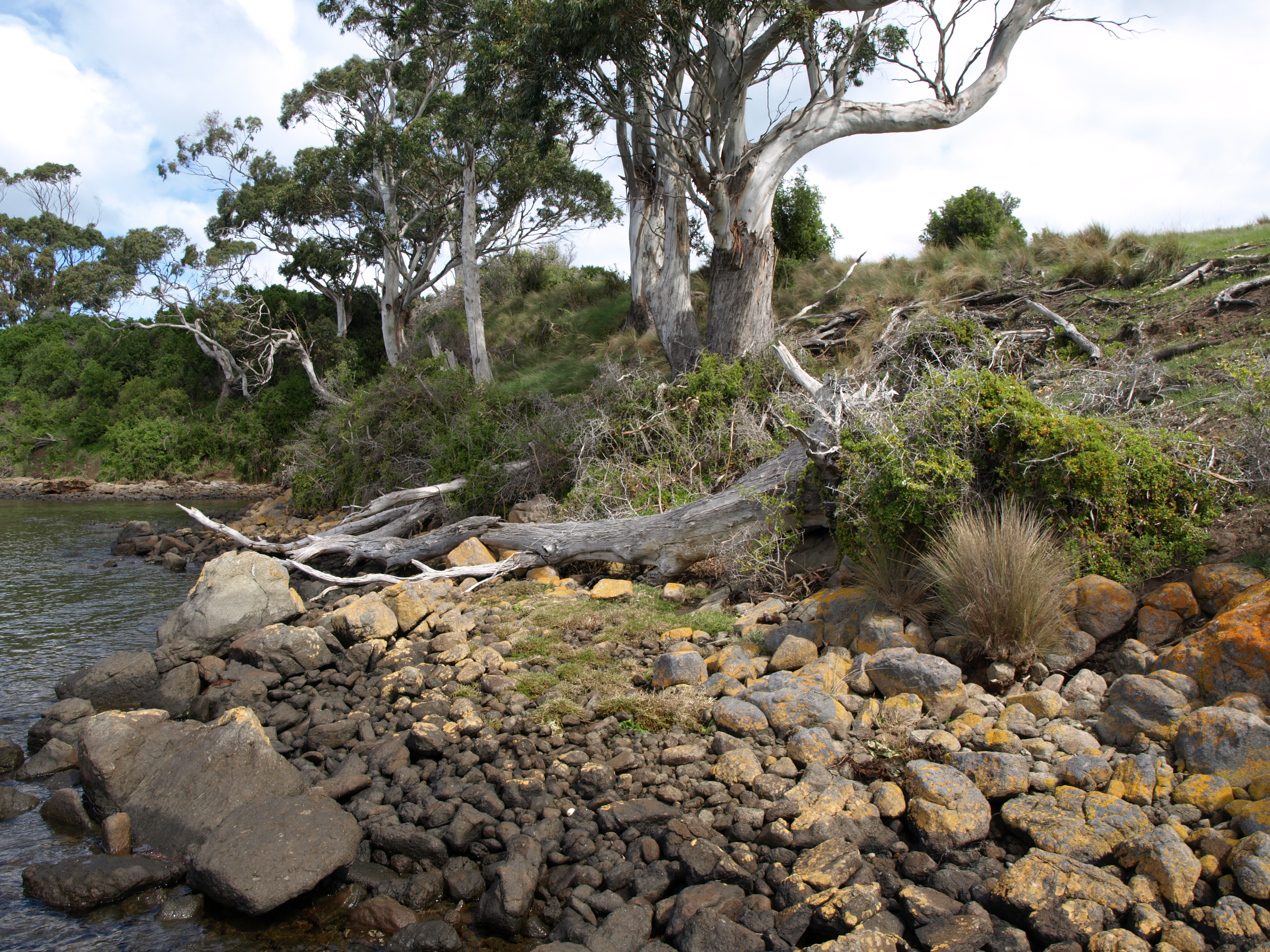

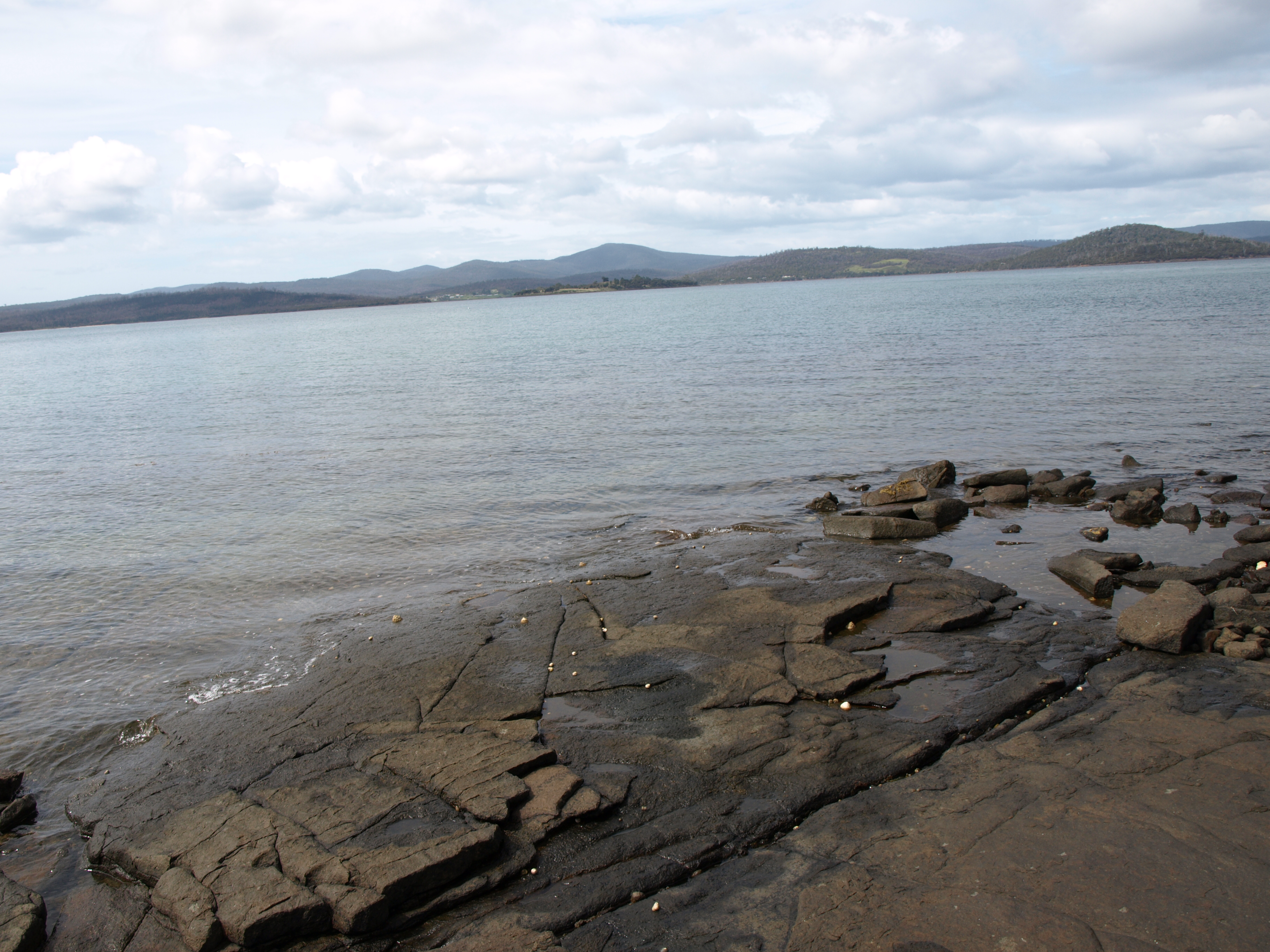

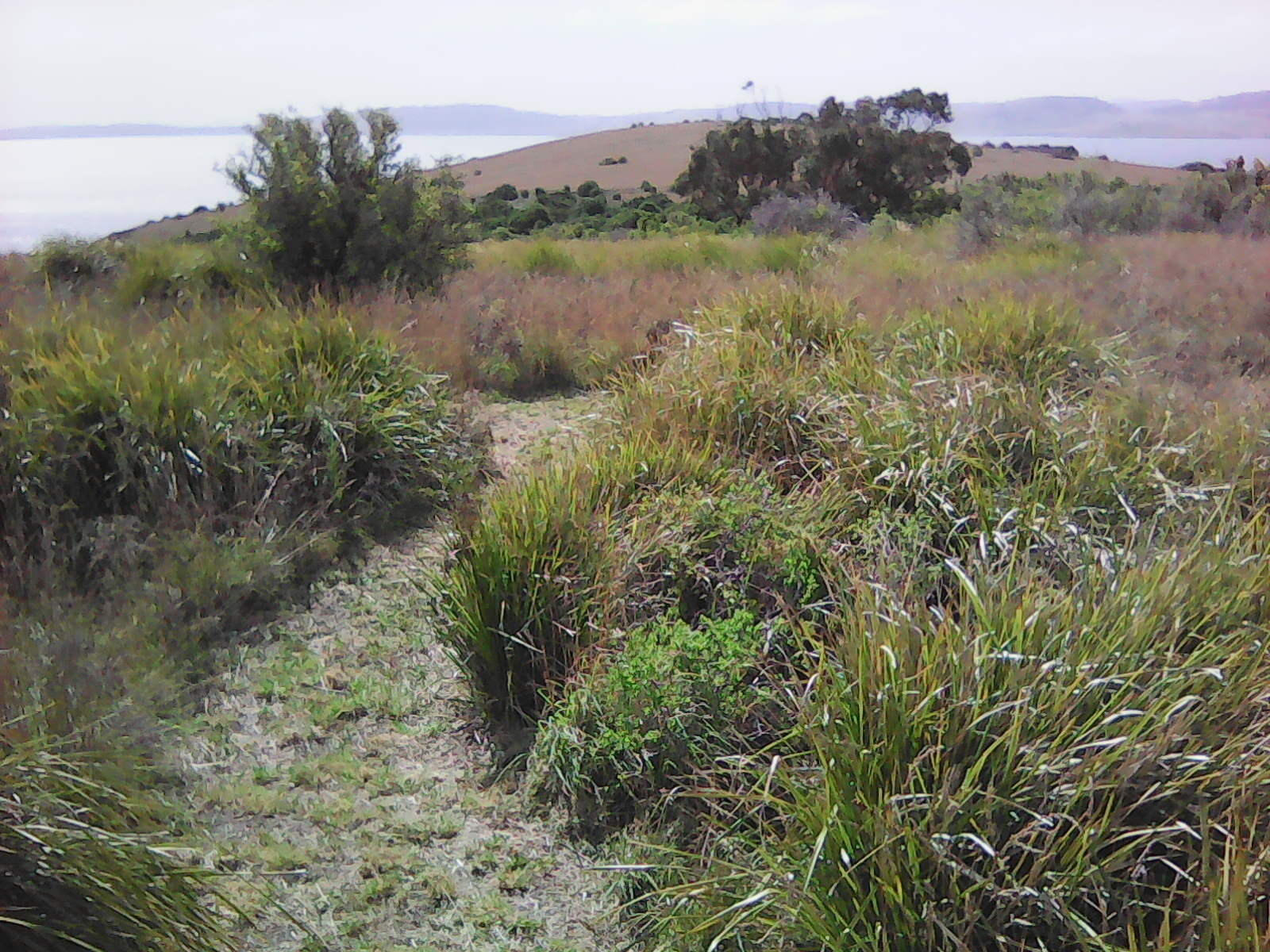

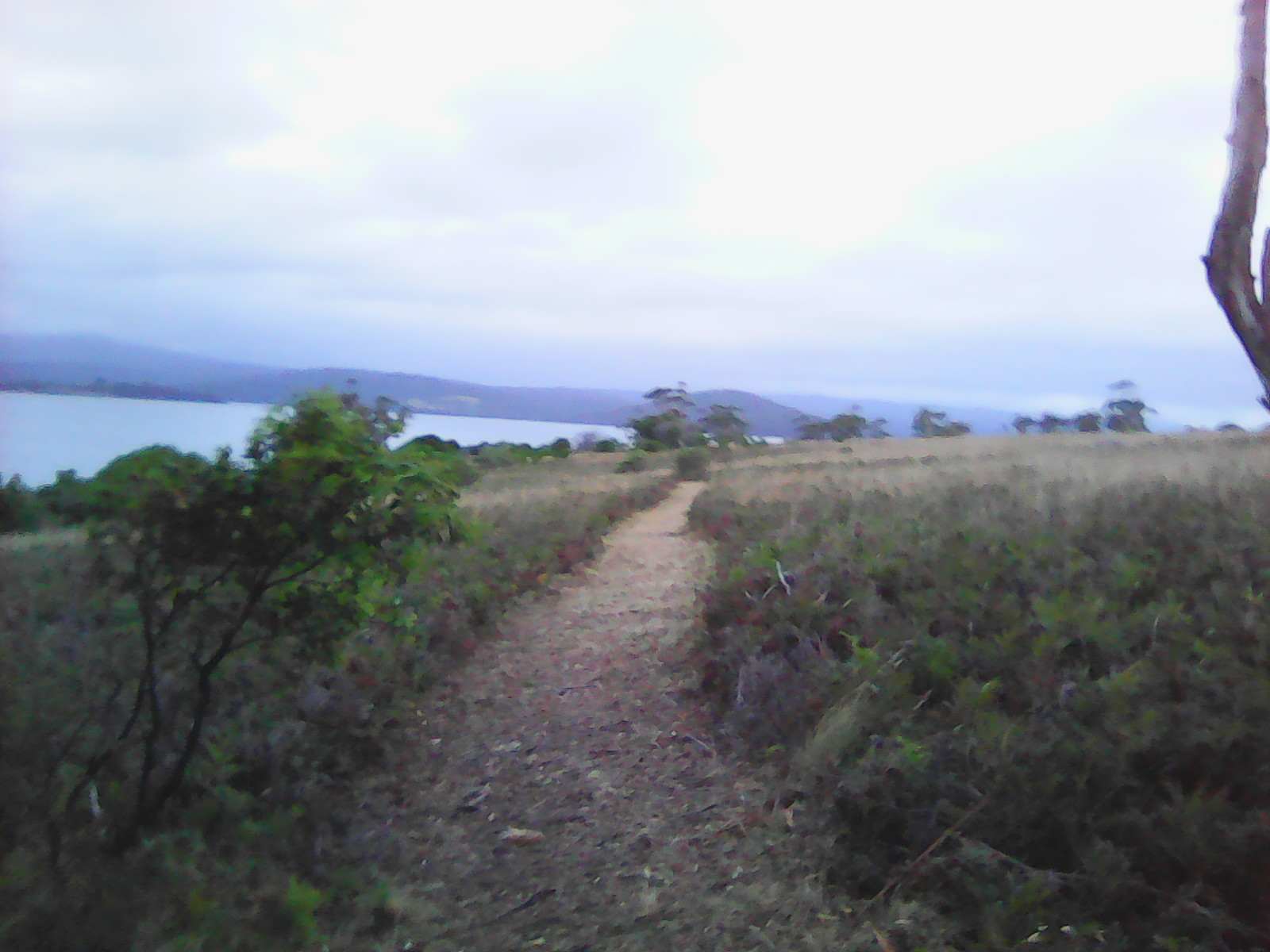

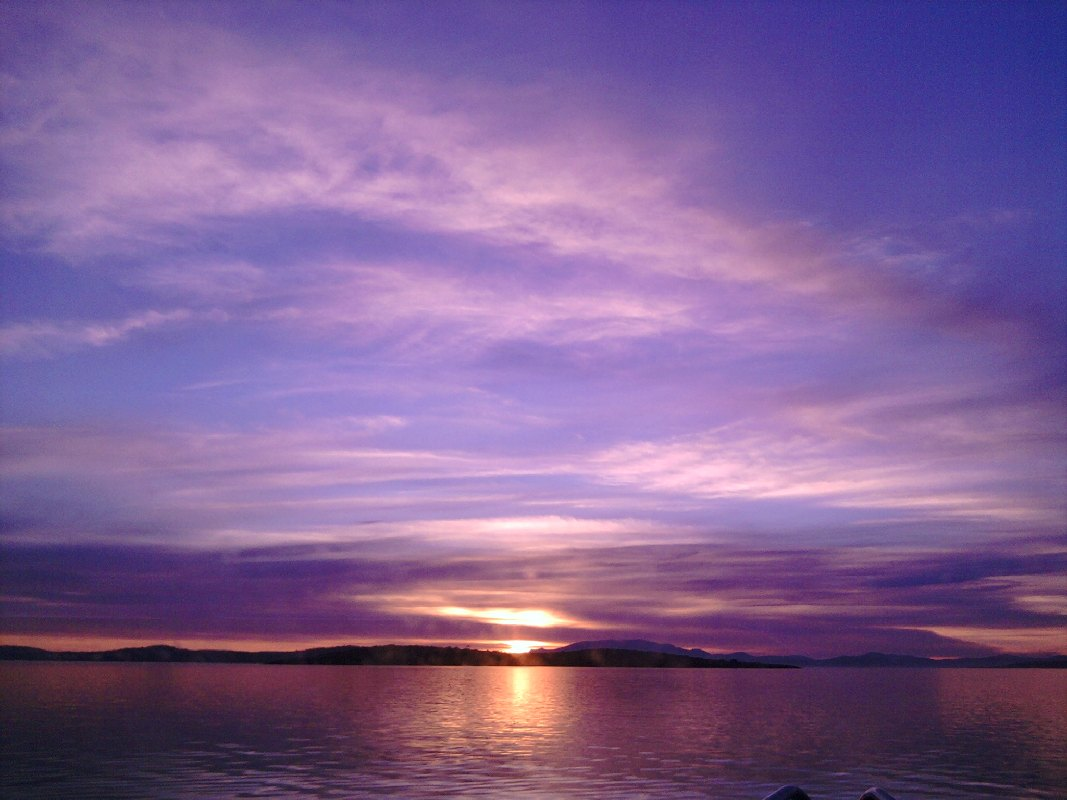

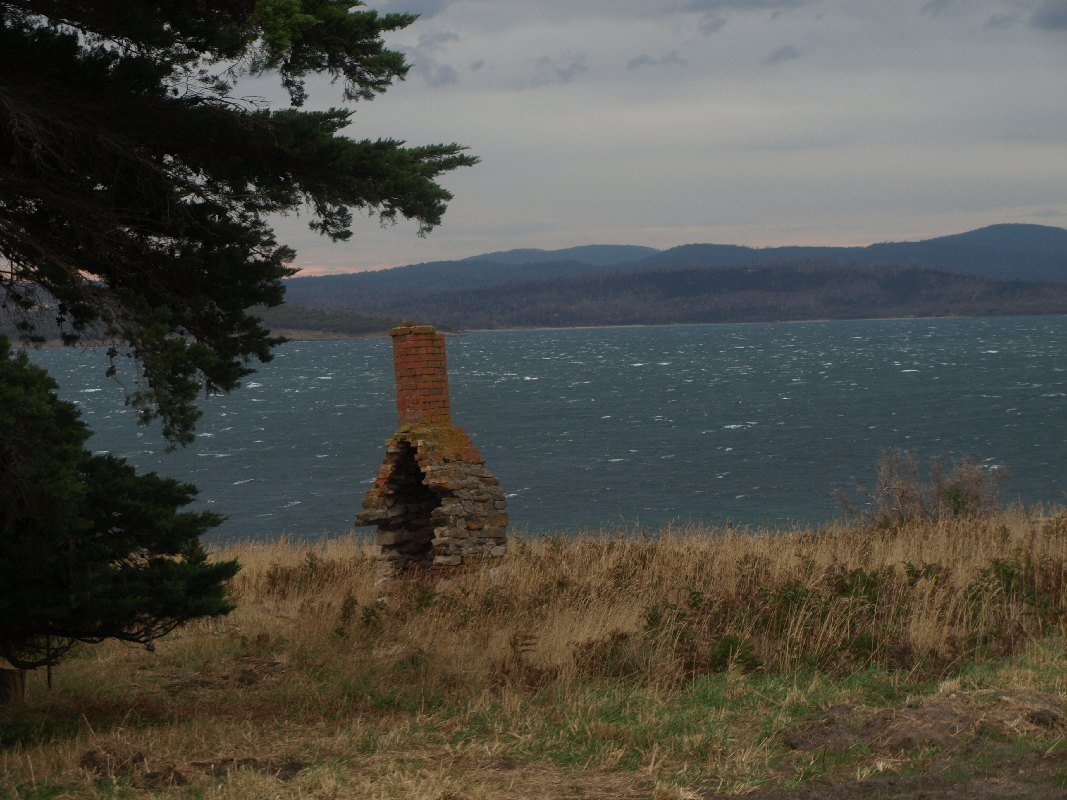

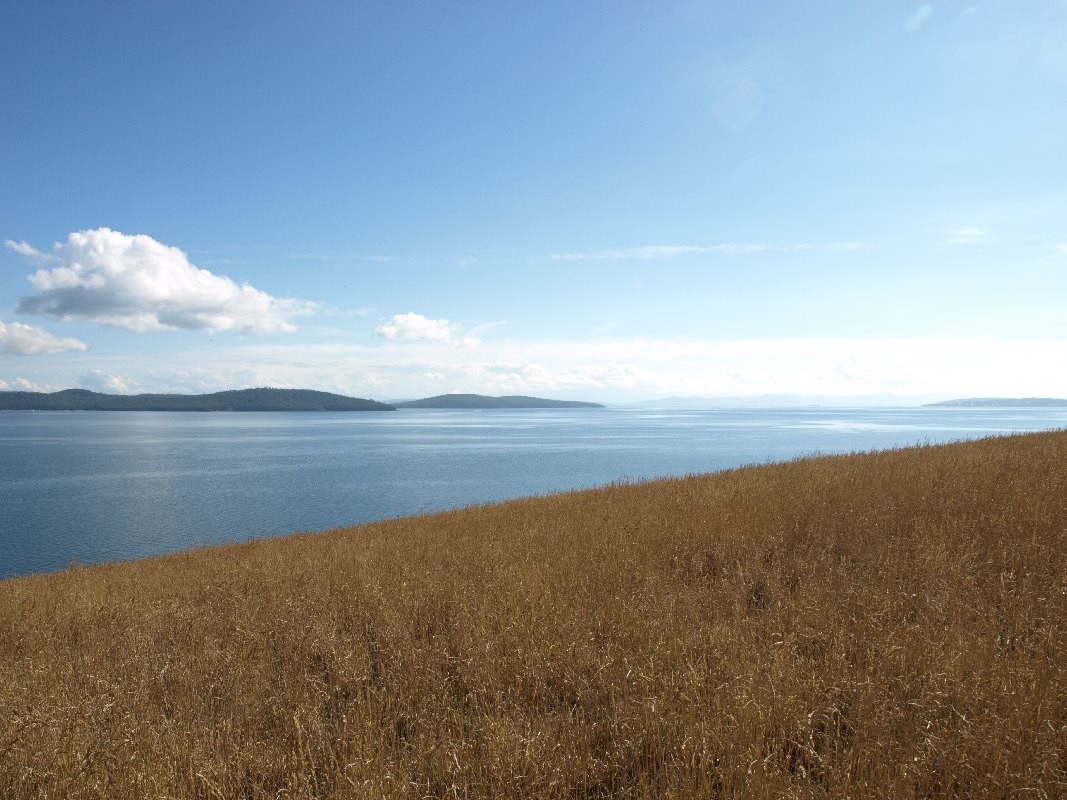

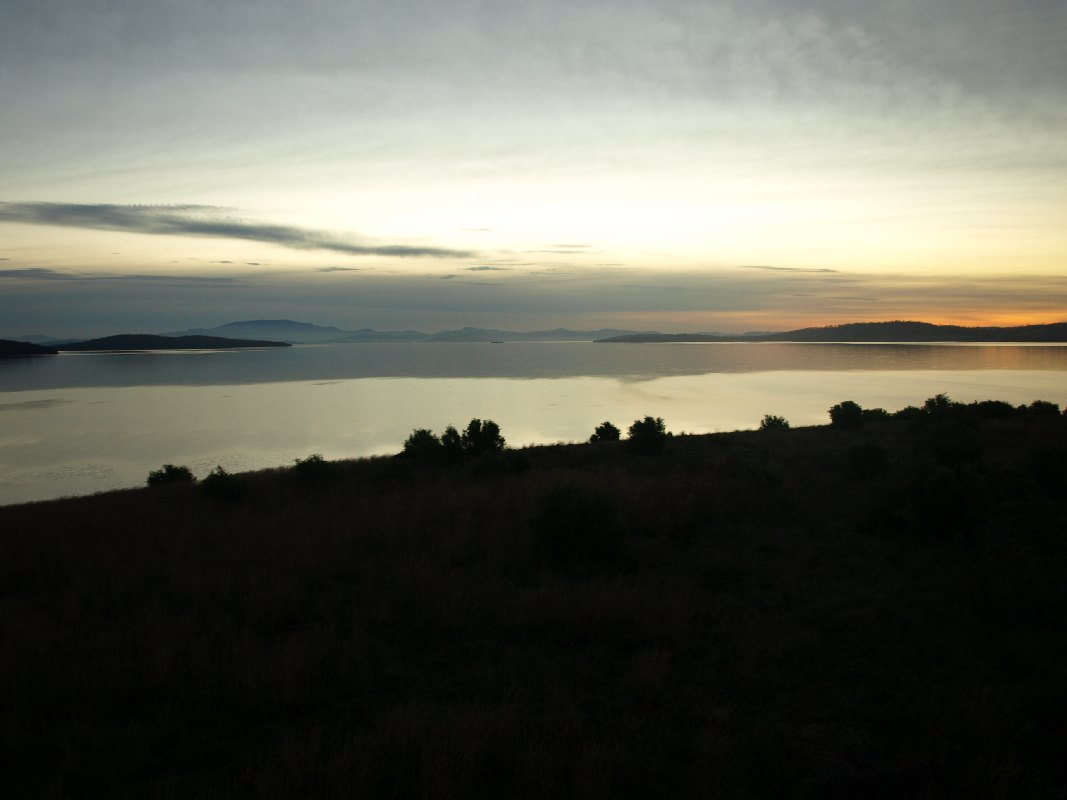

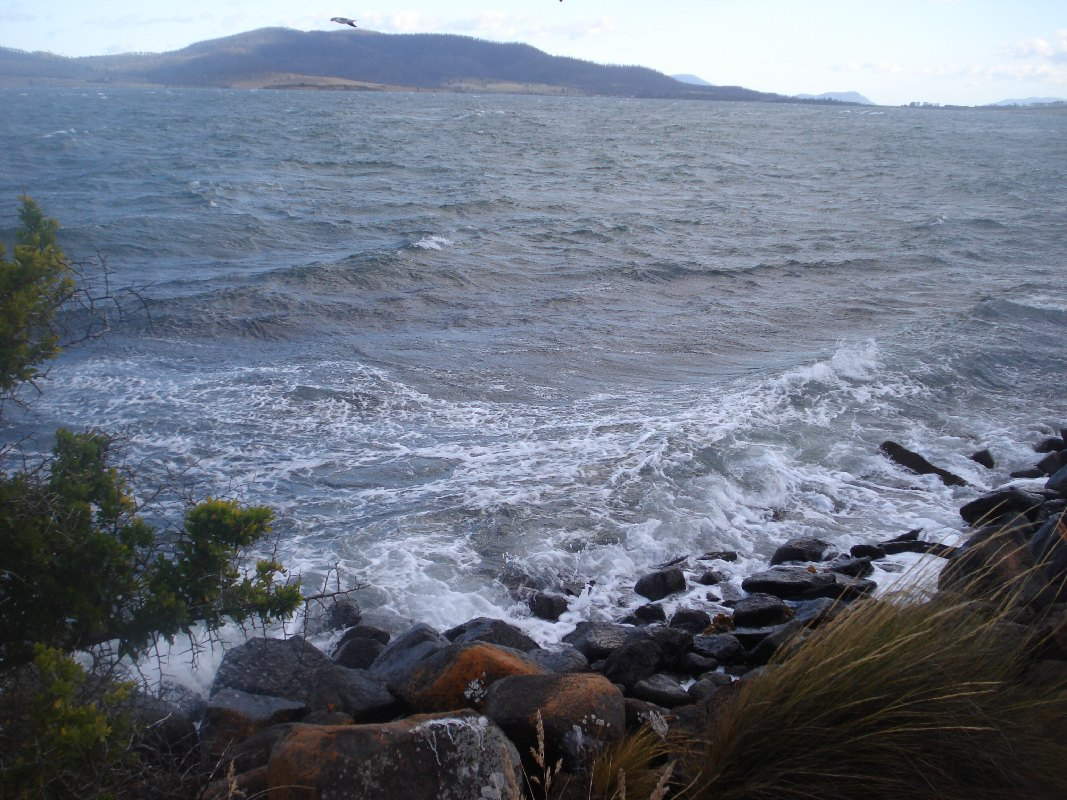

== See also ==
- Weather station
- Aircraft traffic receiver
- Boat traffic receiver
- Biodiversity map
