= Spectacle Island =

Spectacle Island may refer to:

== Australia ==
- Spectacle Island (Hawkesbury River), New South Wales
- Spectacle Island (Port Jackson), New South Wales
- Spectacle Island (Tasmania)
- Little Spectacle Island, Tasmania

== United States ==
- Spectacle Island (Maine)
- Spectacle Island (Massachusetts)

== Canada ==
- Spectacle Island Game Sanctuary, Baddeck, Nova Scotia
