= Woody Island (Tasmania) =

Island in Tasmania, Australia

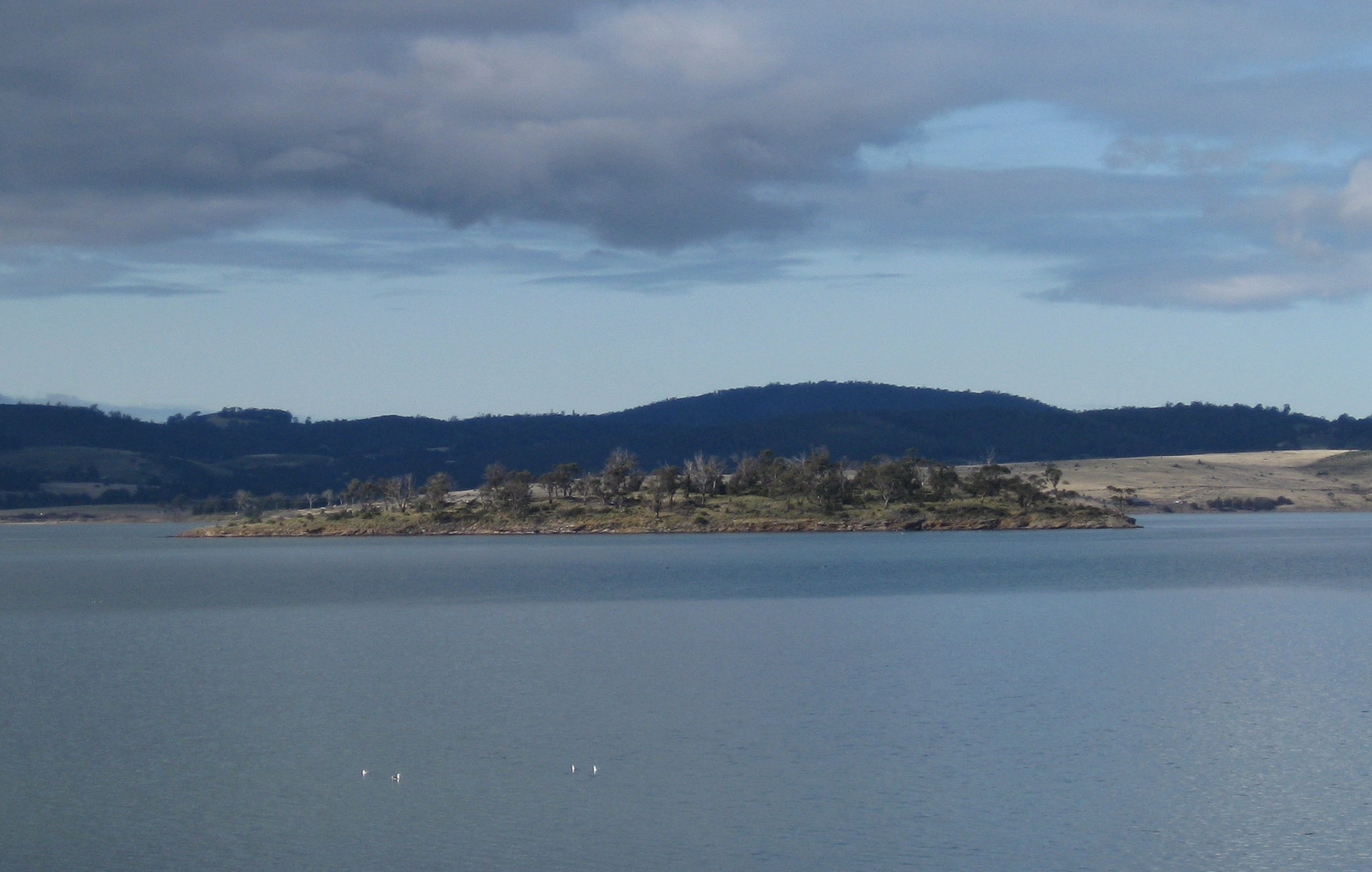
- Woody Island, Tasmania

- Location within Tasmania

Geography
- Location: Tasmania
- Coordinates: 42°48′48″S 147°33′35″E

Administration
- Australia
- State: Tasmania

Woody Island is a small, uninhabited island lying in Pitt Water, Tasmania, Australia. It is part of the Sloping Island Group, lying close to the south-eastern coast of Tasmania around the Tasman and Forestier Peninsulas. The island is approximately 28.3 hectares in size, with cliffs of up to 15 metres in height. The island is a popular boating and recreation site.

Between the late 1980s and 1990, introduced rabbits were a concern on the island, however they were eradicated with the laying of baits in 1990 and no evidence of reintroduction appeared in a 2001 survey. The same survey noted boxthorn, blackberry, and mirror bush and historically Monterey pine on the island and recommended periodic weeding to avoid the island being overrun by bird-introduced vegetation.

== See also ==
- List of islands of Tasmania
