= Fulham Island =

Island in Tasmania, Australia

Coordinates: 42°54′S 147°47′E

Fulham Island is a privately owned island with an area of 10 hectares (25 acres). It is part of the Sloping Island Group, lying close to the south-eastern coast of Tasmania around the Tasman and Forestier Peninsulas in Tasmania, Australia.

== Owner ==
In 2016, Fulham Island was purchased by the Singaporean Hotelier and property magnate Koh Wee Meng (Aka "James Koh") through his company "JK Island Pty Ltd". James Koh is a billionaire and controls Singapore-listed Fragrance Group. Despite facing objections in a Tasmanian planning tribunal from local wildlife groups, James Koh's company continues construction of a jetty on the island.

== Marine ==
Waldemar reef is present at the north-east end of Fulham island.

== Flora and fauna ==
The island has been extensively grazed and the vegetation is dominated by introduced grasses, bracken, boxthorn and some remnant blackwoods.

Recorded breeding seabird species are little penguin, short-tailed shearwater and kelp gull.

== See also ==
Old county map featuring Fulham island as 'Green Island'.
