= Visscher Island =

Island in Tasmania, Australia

Coordinates: 42°51′S 147°58′E

Visscher Island is an island, with an area of 3.4 ha, in south-eastern Tasmania, in Australia.

It is part of the Sloping Island Group, lying close to the south-eastern coast of Tasmania around the Tasman and Forestier Peninsulas. It is part of the Tasman National Park.

== Flora and fauna ==
Recorded breeding seabird species are little penguin, white-faced storm-petrel, Pacific gull, kelp gull and Caspian tern. Occasionally Australian fur seals haul-out there in small numbers. The metallic skink is present.
