= Barren Island (Tasmania) =

Island in Tasmania, Australia

Coordinates: 42.815086°S 147.531415°E

Barren Island is a small island, with an area of 0.53 ha, in south-eastern Australia. It is part of the Sloping Island Group, lying close to the south-eastern coast of Tasmania around the Tasman and Forestier Peninsulas.

== Fauna ==
Recorded breeding seabird species are silver gull and kelp gull. The three-lined skink is also present.
