= Sloping Island Group =

Island group in Tasmania, Australia

Coordinates: 42°57′S 147°38′E

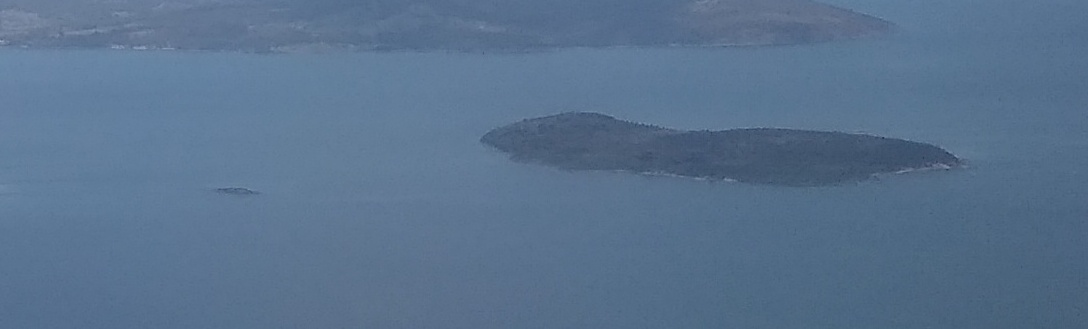
Hog Island (left) and Sloping Island (right), two islands in the group

The Sloping Island Group is a group of small islands in south-eastern Tasmania in Australia. They lie close to the south-eastern coast of Tasmania around the Tasman and Forestier Peninsulas.

The group consists of:

- Sloping Island
- Barren Island
- Fulham Island
- Hog Island
- King George Island
- Smooth Island
- Spectacle Island
- Little Spectacle Island
- Visscher Island
- Woody Island
