= Little Spectacle Island =

Island in Tasmania, Australia

Coordinates: 42°52′S 147°36′E

Little Spectacle Island is a small island, with an area of 0.62 ha, part of the Sloping Island Group, lying close to the south-eastern coast of Tasmania, Australia around the Tasman and Forestier Peninsulas, and adjacent Spectacle Island.

== Fauna ==
Recorded breeding seabird species are little penguin, silver gull and crested tern.
