= Sloping Island =

Island in Tasmania, Australia

Coordinates: 42°57′S 147°38′E

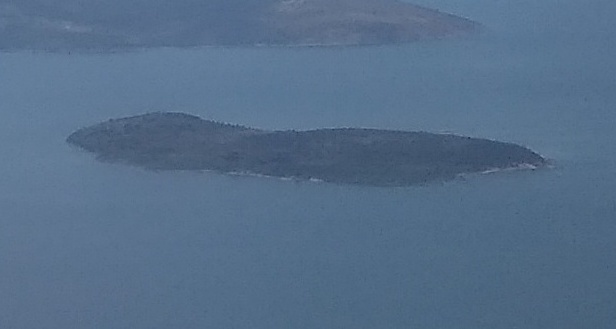
Sloping Island

Sloping Island, incorporating the adjacent Sloping Reef, is an island nature reserve, with an area of 117 ha, in Tasmania in south-eastern Australia. It is part of the Sloping Island Group, lying close to the south-eastern coast of Tasmania around the Tasman and Forestier Peninsulas.

== Fauna ==
Recorded breeding seabird and wader species are little penguin, short-tailed shearwater, Pacific gull, sooty oystercatcher and pied oystercatcher. Mammals present include common ringtail possums and European rabbits.

== History ==
Shore-based whaling stations operated at Sloping Island, near the entrance to Frederick Henry Bay, in the 1820s.

In 1911, readers made submissions to the local newspaper The Mercury regarding the history of the island: "It is called Sloping Island on the Admiralty maps, and was called St. Aignon, after one of his officers by D'Entrecasteaux, on his map. Since then it has been variously called Sloping, Slopen, Sterring, and St. Aignon."
