= King George Island (Tasmania) =

Island in Tasmania, Australia

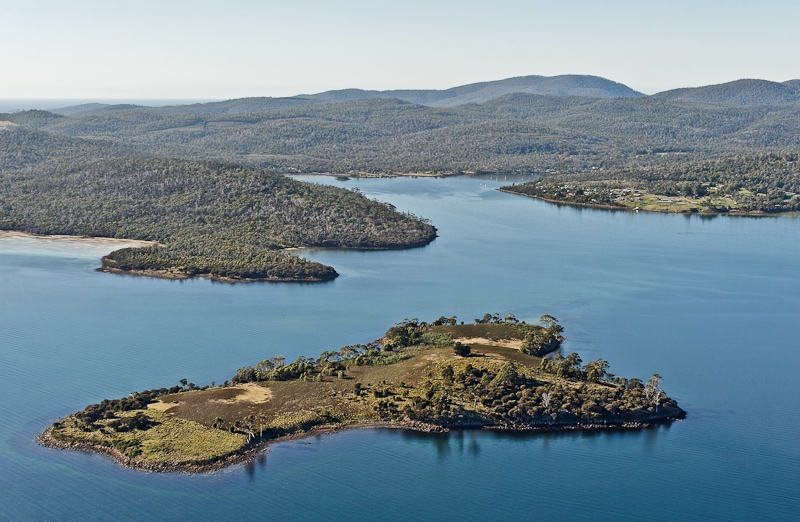
- Aerial photograph of King George Island

- Location within Tasmania

Geography
- Location: Tasmania
- Coordinates: 42°57′S 147°49′E
- Archipelago: Sloping Island Group
- Adjacent to: Norfolk Bay
- Area: 0.198 km^{2} (0.076 sq mi)

Administration
- Australia
- Land district: Pembroke

Additional information
- Time zone: UTC+10 (AEST) UTC+11 (AEDT)
- Discovered in 1798

King George Island is an island in south-eastern Australia. It is part of the Sloping Island Group, lying close to the south-eastern coast of Tasmania around the Tasman and Forestier Peninsulas. The island was once inhabited and farmed and contains the ruins of two buildings on its eastern side. A conservation covenant is in place on this island.

== Flora and fauna ==
Much of the island's original vegetation has been destroyed by clearing and burning, though there are remnant stands of allocasuarinas and eucalypts. Rabbits are present as well as the metallic skink and White's skink. Details of the fauna and flora of the island can be found in this article by Bush Heritage Australia from 2010.

== Nomenclature ==
King George Island has also been referred to as "Gull Island" on maps of Bass and Flinders' voyage in 1798-1799 around the Tasman peninsula. It was still referred to Gull Island in 1836.

== History ==
Captain James Kelly applied to the government in 1841 for a lease for three acres of land on the island to operate a bay whaling station.

On 15 June 1863 King George Island was put to public auction through a large sale of crown land, with offers over £54 considered. On the 15 November 1884 the island was sold by the owner John Clark. In 1914 a gentleman named Mr G. Long, from Dunalley, owned the island. He grew potatoes on the island.
