= Roaring Beach =

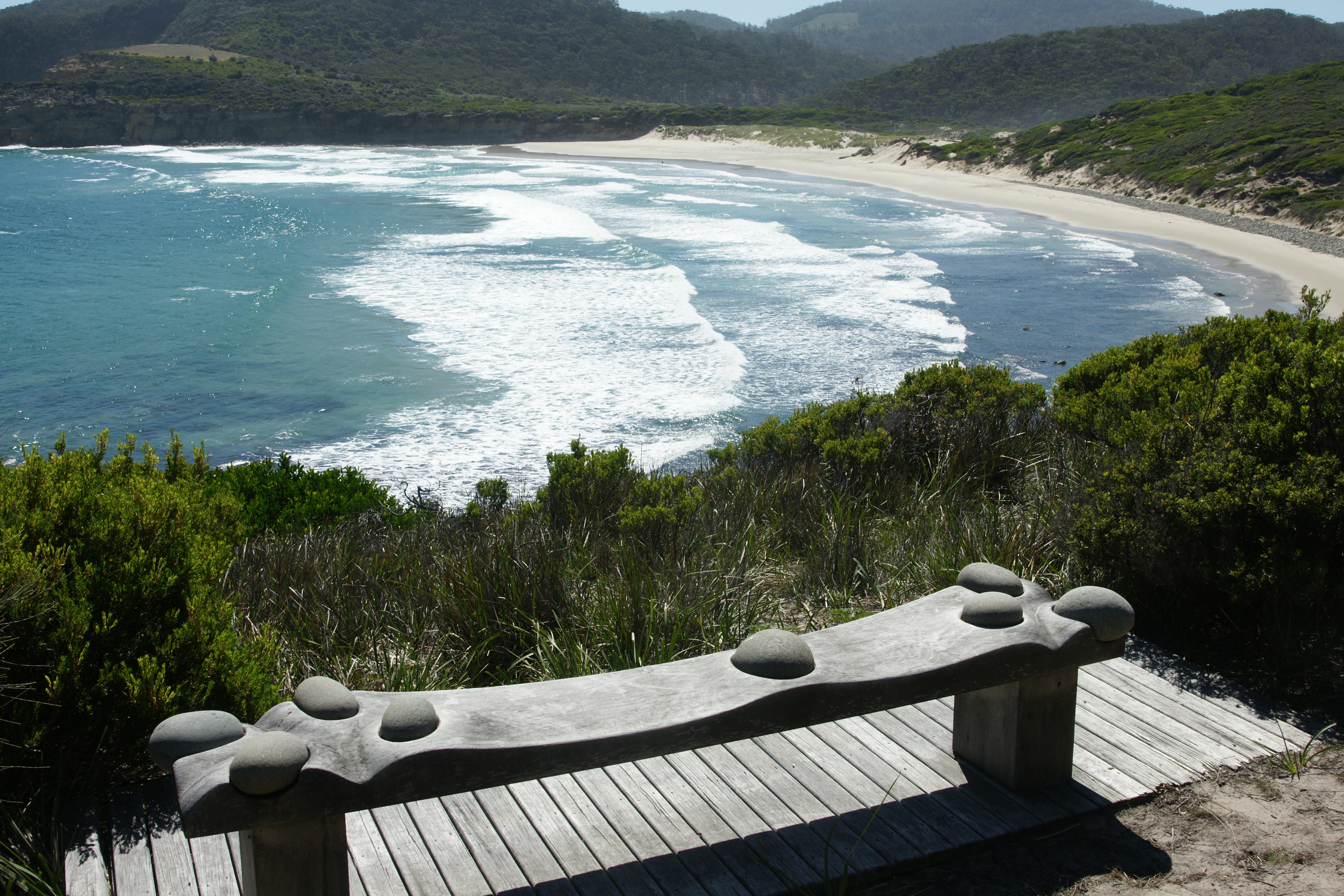
- Roaring Beach

- Coordinates: 43°05′17″S 147°40′23″E
- Country: Australia
- State: Tasmania
- LGA: Tasmanian Government
- Established: pre 1959
- Mean max temp: 18 °C (64 °F)
- Mean min temp: 5 °C (41 °F)
- Annual rainfall: 900 mm (35 in)

Roaring Beach is a beach notable for its sand dunes, surfing and beach combing on the Tasman Peninsula, Tasmania, Australia

== Surfing ==
This popular surfing beach is the only one on the west coast of the Tasman Peninsula, which is the prevailing wind direction. It has a dangerous rip.

It is part of Protected areas of Tasmania under conservation areas. It is accessed by road from Nubeena (the aboriginal word for crayfish).

== Aboriginal artefacts ==
Middens, fossilised wood and stone tools exist near the mouth of the creek.
