= Spectacle Island (Tasmania) =

Island in Tasmania, Australia

Coordinates: 42°52′S 147°36′E

Spectacle Island is a 3.5-hectare (8.6-acre) island in south-eastern Australia. It is part of the Sloping Island Group, lying close to the south-eastern coast of Tasmania around the Tasman and Forestier Peninsulas. Recorded breeding seabird and wader species are little penguin, short-tailed shearwater and pied oystercatcher.
