= East Bay Neck =

Isthmus on eastern coast of Tasmania, Australia

Coordinates: 42.891720°S 147.808051°E

East Bay Neck refers to an isthmus connecting the Forestier Peninsula to the mainland of Tasmania.

East Bay Neck is formed by Dunalley Bay on the west and Blackman Bay on the east.

In 1905 the Denison Canal was constructed at East Bay Neck which enabled maritime vessels to easily move between these two bays.
