= Tasman Peninsula =

Peninsula on the east coast of Tasmania, Australia

Tasman Peninsula Turrakana / Tasman Peninsula
- Dolerite
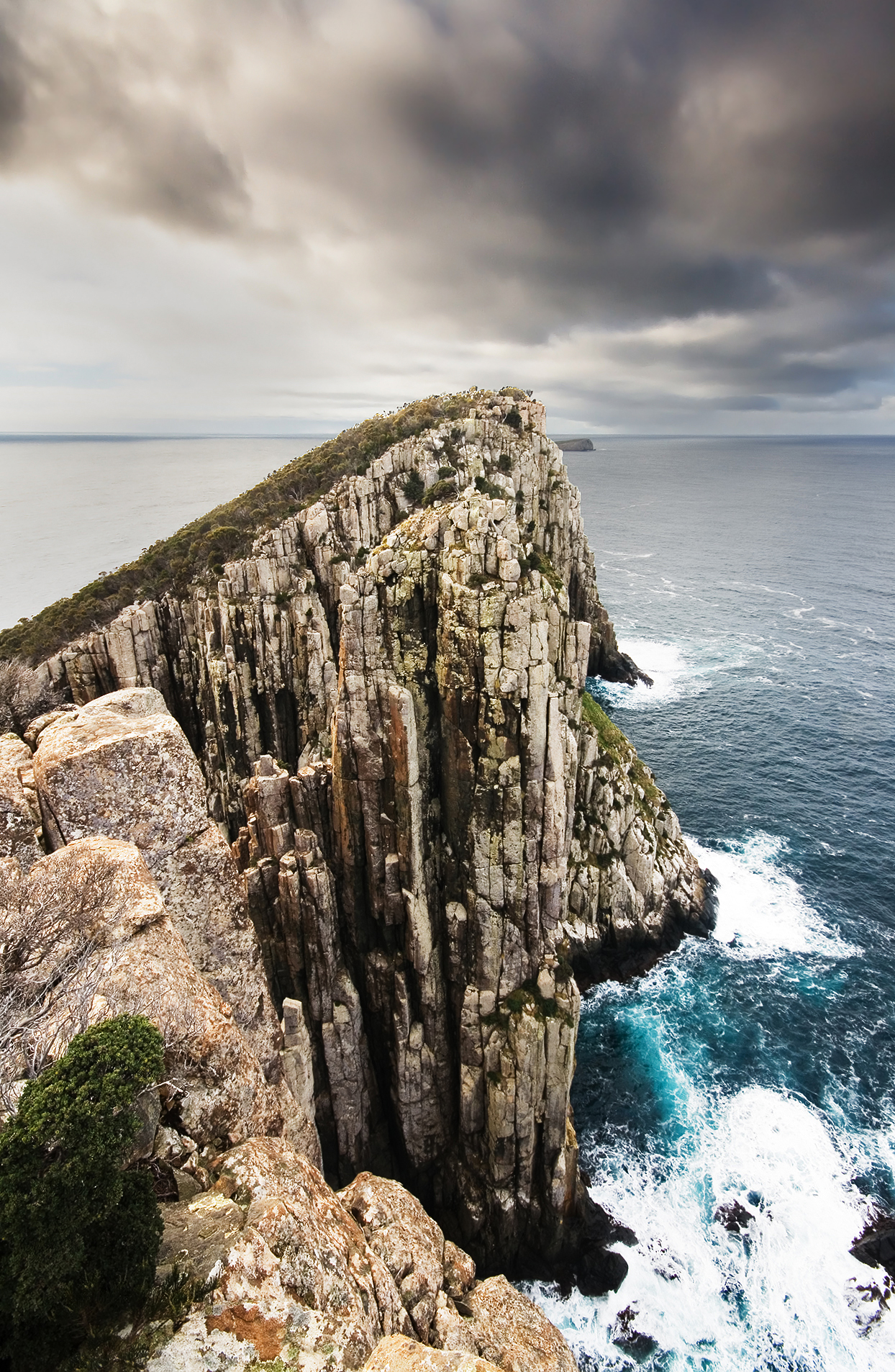
- The Totem Pole, Cape Hauy on the Tasman Peninsula. The Lanterns and the Hippolyte Rocks are visible behind.

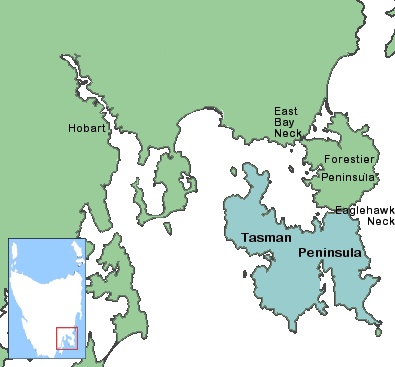
- Location in South-eastern Tasmania
- Coordinates: 43°05′24″S 147°50′24″E
- Location: South-eastern Tasmania, Australia

Area
  - Total: 660 km^{2} (250 sq mi)
- Designation: Tasman National Park; World Heritage Site (part)

The Tasman Peninsula, officially Turrakana / Tasman Peninsula, is a peninsula located in south-east Tasmania, Australia, approximately 75 km (47 mi) by the Arthur Highway, south-east of Hobart.

The Tasman Peninsula lies south and west of Forestier Peninsula, to which it connects via a narrow (less than 30 metres (98 ft) wide at its narrowest point) isthmus called Eaglehawk Neck. This in turn is joined to the rest of Tasmania by an isthmus called East Bay Neck, near the town of Dunalley, approximately 60 kilometres (37 mi) by road from Hobart. The peninsula is surrounded by water; to the north by Norfolk Bay, to the northwest by Frederick Henry Bay, to the west and south by Storm Bay, and to the east by the Tasman Sea.

== Description ==
Many smaller towns are also located on the Tasman Peninsula, the largest of which are Nubeena and Koonya. Smaller centres include Premaydena, Highcroft and Stormlea. The Conservation Park, located on the main highway at Taranna, is a popular local visitor attraction along with the World Heritage Port Arthur Historic Site and a number of beaches.

The local government area is the Tasman Council. The area of the peninsula and of the local government area is 660 square kilometres (250 sq mi).

== History ==
The original name for the area is Turrakana. The Aboriginal inhabitants of this area preceding European arrival were the Pydairrerme people. Their territory was what is now known as the Tasman and Forestier peninsulas. The Pydairrerme people were a part of the larger Paredarerme language group, whose territory covered a large area of the east coast of Tasmania. The area was named after Dutch explorer Abel Tasman after colonisation but was dual named as of March 2021.

The first European settlement of the peninsula was Port Arthur in the early 1830s. It was selected as a penal settlement because it was geographically isolated from the rest of the colony but more easily reachable by sea than the other place of secondary banishment, Macquarie Harbour on the west coast, which could then be closed down. It also had excellent supplies of timber for shipbuilding and general construction work, and a deep sheltered harbour where visiting British warships could be repaired. Its inaccessibility was enhanced by having Eaglehawk Neck lined with guards and guard dogs, to prevent the escape of any convicts. A small number did escape, including the bushranger Martin Cash.

The Coal Mines Historic Site, located near the north tip west of the peninsula, was originally the site of a convict-operated coal mine.

The penal settlement of Port Arthur is now a tourist attraction. As in most of the rest of the state, tourism is a major industry. Bushwalking is also popular in the often rugged terrain, particularly picturesque spots being Cape Raoul and Cape Pillar at the extreme south-west and south-east ends of the peninsula, separated by the entrance to Port Arthur.

=== Local industry ===
In the era between the convict settlement and the rise of the modern tourist industry, people in the area were mostly engaged in the timber industry and fishing. The terrain and soil types impeded large-scale agriculture, although orcharding and general farming was and is conducted in suitable locations. The region remained highly isolated until the introduction of regular river steamer services between it and Hobart in the 1880s—they were further encouraged by the tourist industry to Port Arthur that began when overseas steamships began to call into Hobart, also during the 1880s. During the period 1900–1930s, the main operator servicing the area was the Huon Channel & Peninsula Steamship Company, owners of several vessels including the extant MV Cartela.

== Environment ==
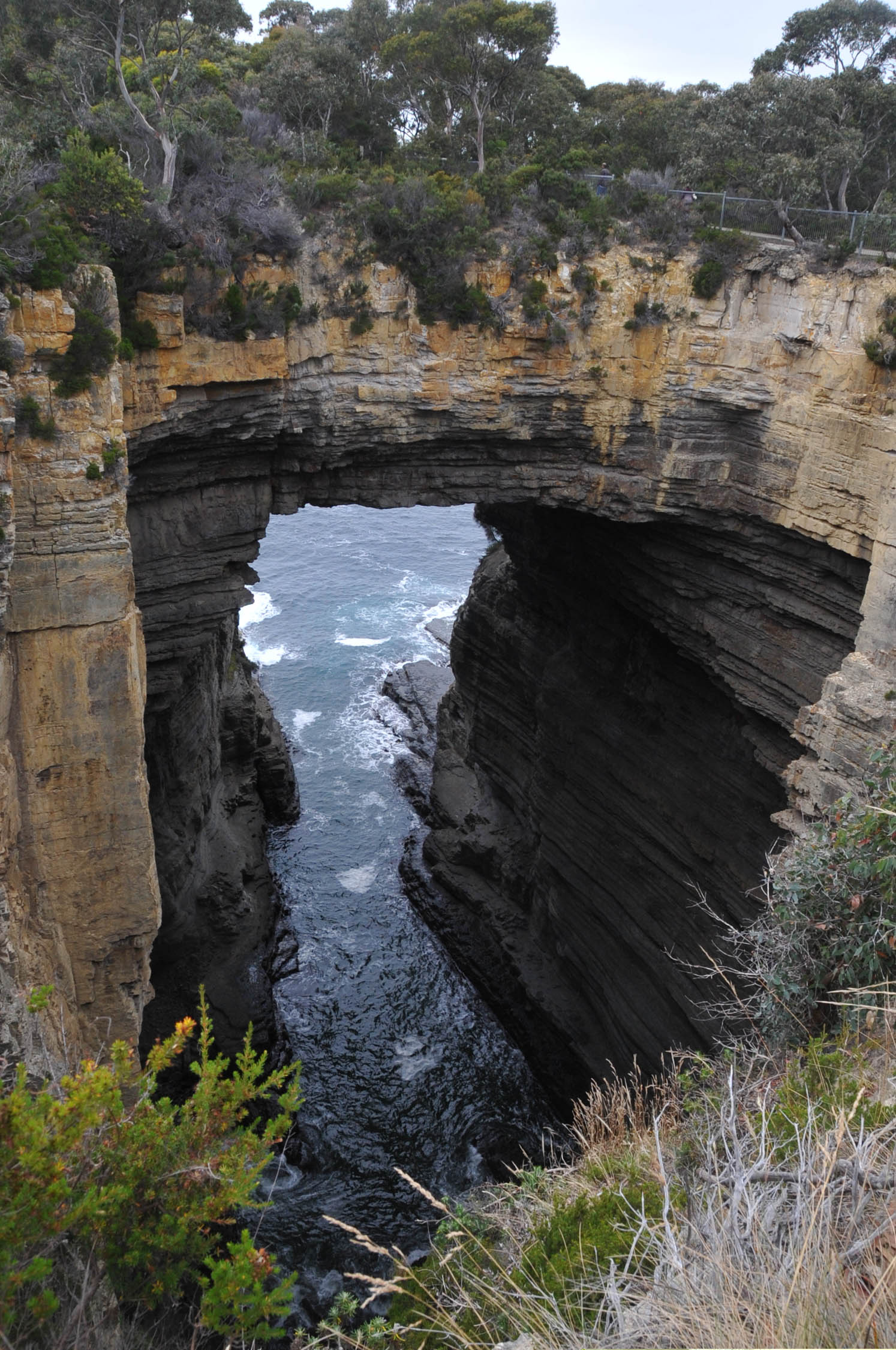
Tasman arch and littoral chasm, Tasman National Park

=== Plants ===
The rare Cape Pillar sheoak is a shrub or small tree found only in the Tasman National Park where it is restricted to the Cape Pillar area of the Tasman Peninsula and to Tasman Island.

=== Birds ===
The peninsula forms part of the South-east Tasmania Important Bird Area, identified as such by BirdLife International because of its importance in the conservation of a range of woodland birds, especially the endangered swift parrot and forty-spotted pardalote.

=== Tasmanian devil ===
While the region is best known for its convict history it is now the key area in the battle to save the Tasmanian devil from extinction from a new type of contagious cancer called devil facial tumour disease (DFTD). The isolation from the Tasmanian mainland, where DFTD is running unchecked and has killed more than half of all devils, is ideal for maintaining a healthy wild Tasmanian devil population in a project that involves the local Tasmanian Devil Conservation Park at Taranna and government and university scientists.

=== Coastline ===
The rugged coastline has been the scene of a number of shipwrecks. Two large seagoing steamers have sunk after hitting the Hippolyte Rocks off its east coast—the Tasman in 1883 and the Nord in 1915. Munroe Bight to the north of Cape Pillar is named after the former American barque James Munroe wrecked there in 1850.

The Tasman Peninsula is well known for its rugged eastern coastline, and much of it is now the Tasman National Park. The geology of the coastline is predominantly limestone and Jurassic dolerite. At Eaglehawk Neck are many strange rock formations, including The Devils Kitchen, Tasman's Arch, Blow Hole and the Tessellated Pavement. Further south are the highest sea cliffs in the Southern Hemisphere, rising 300 metres (980 ft) above the Tasman Sea at Cape Pillar.

The peninsula has notable surf spots at Cape Raoul, Roaring Beach and Shipstern Bluff.

A historical survey map is available which outlines the geology and vegetation of the Tasman Peninsula, Forestier Peninsula and south east from the Coal River.

== Gallery ==
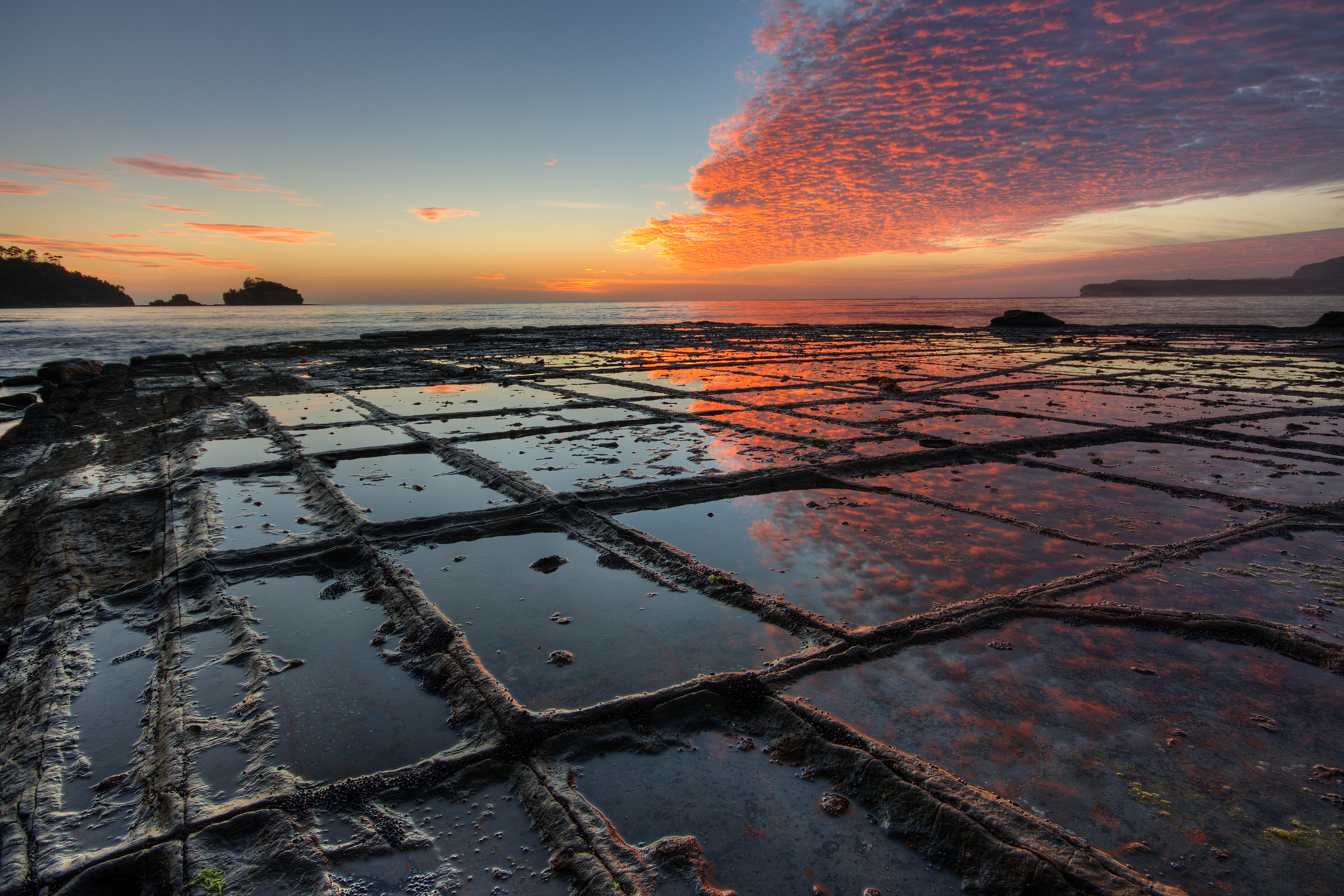
Tessellated pavement natural rock formation

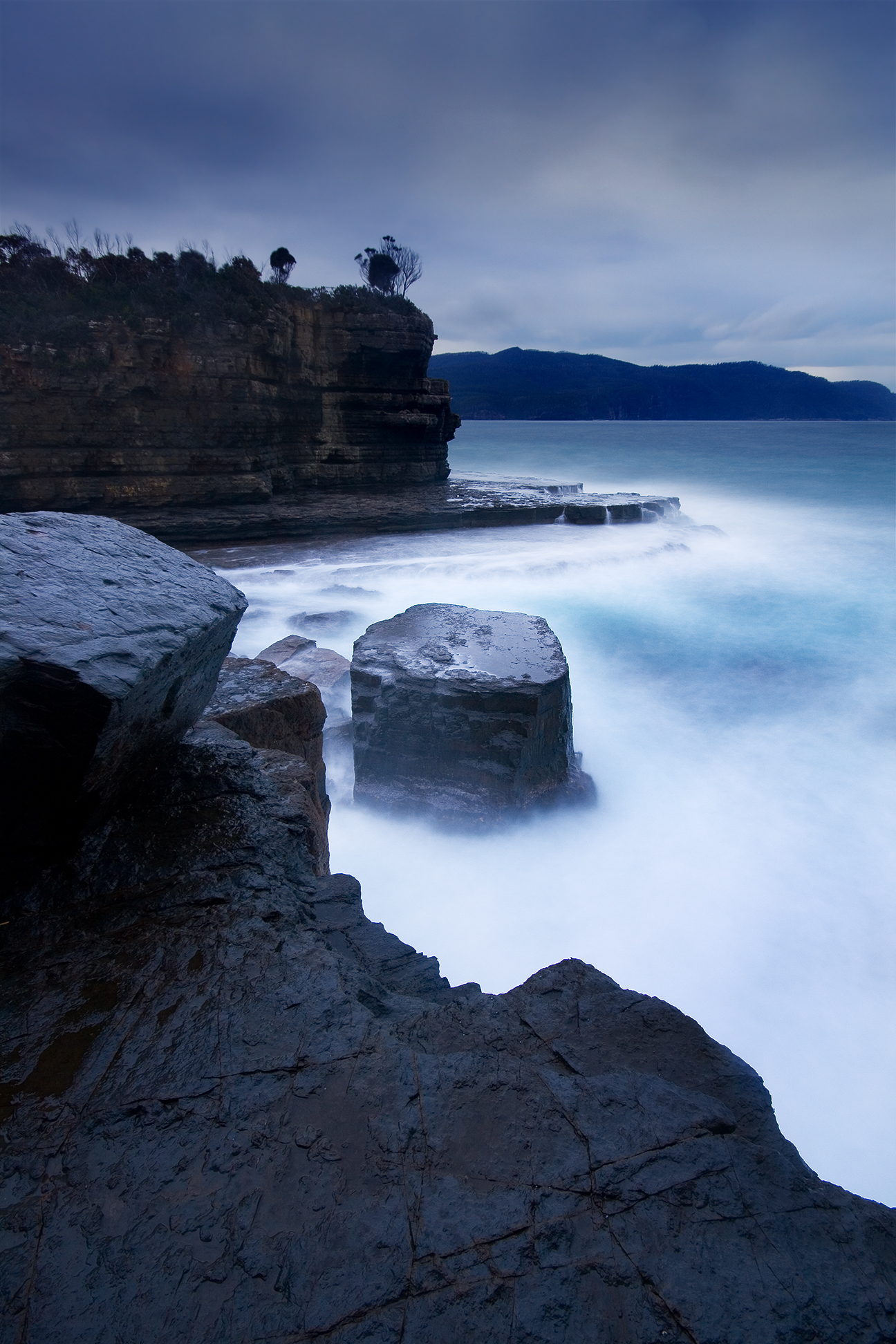
Fossil Bay at sunset

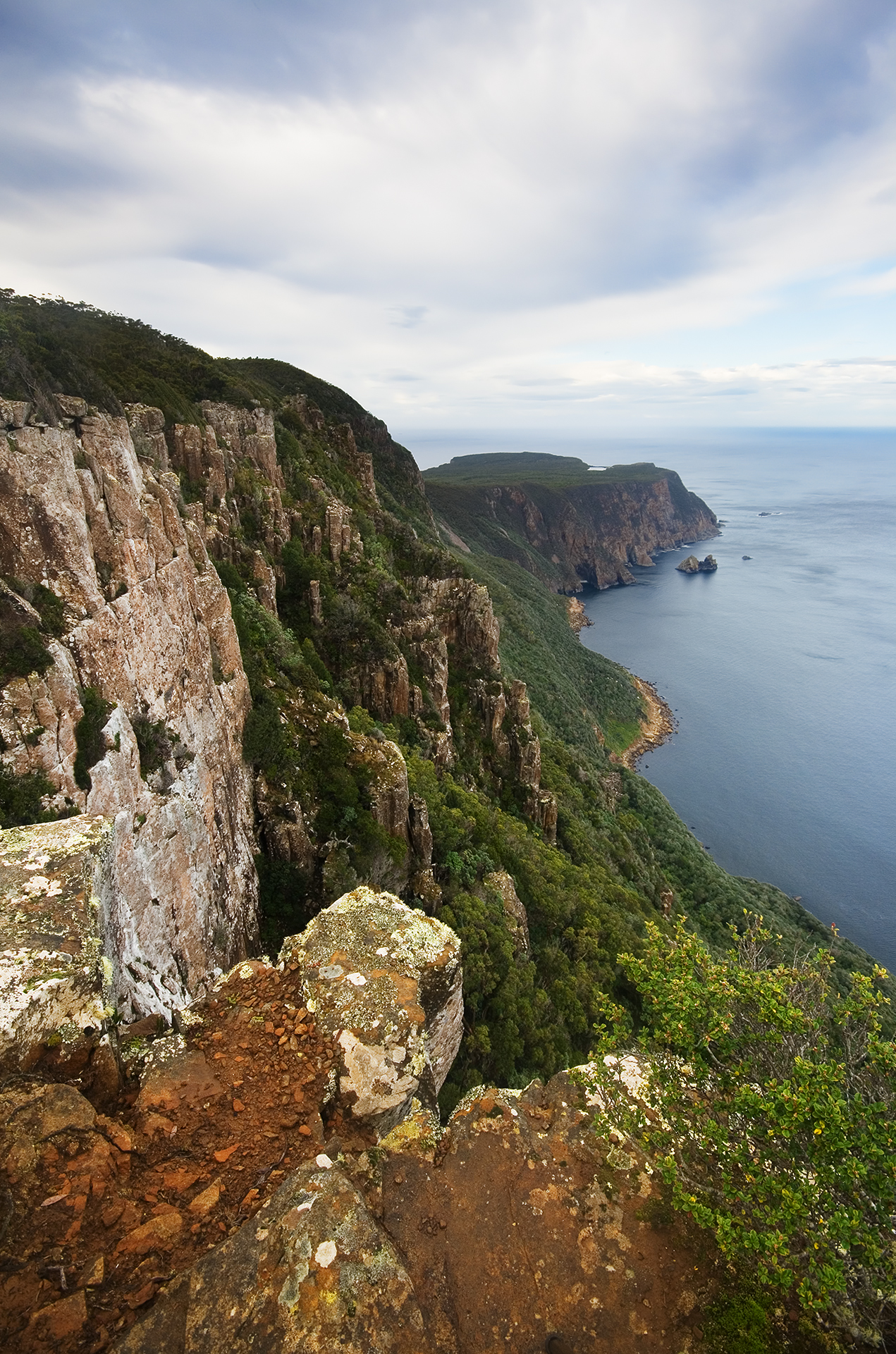
Dolerite columns of Cape Raoul

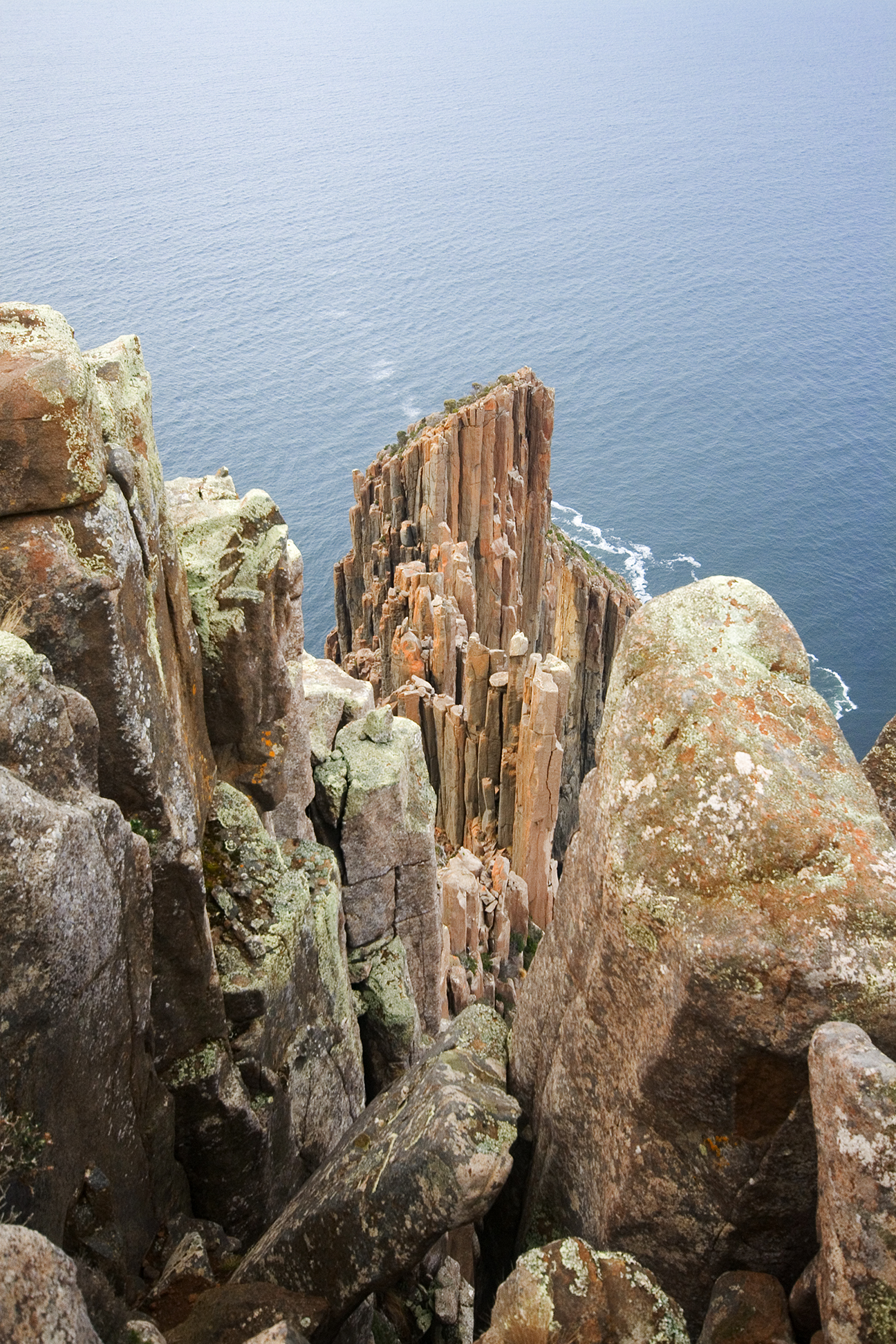
Columns at the tip of the cape

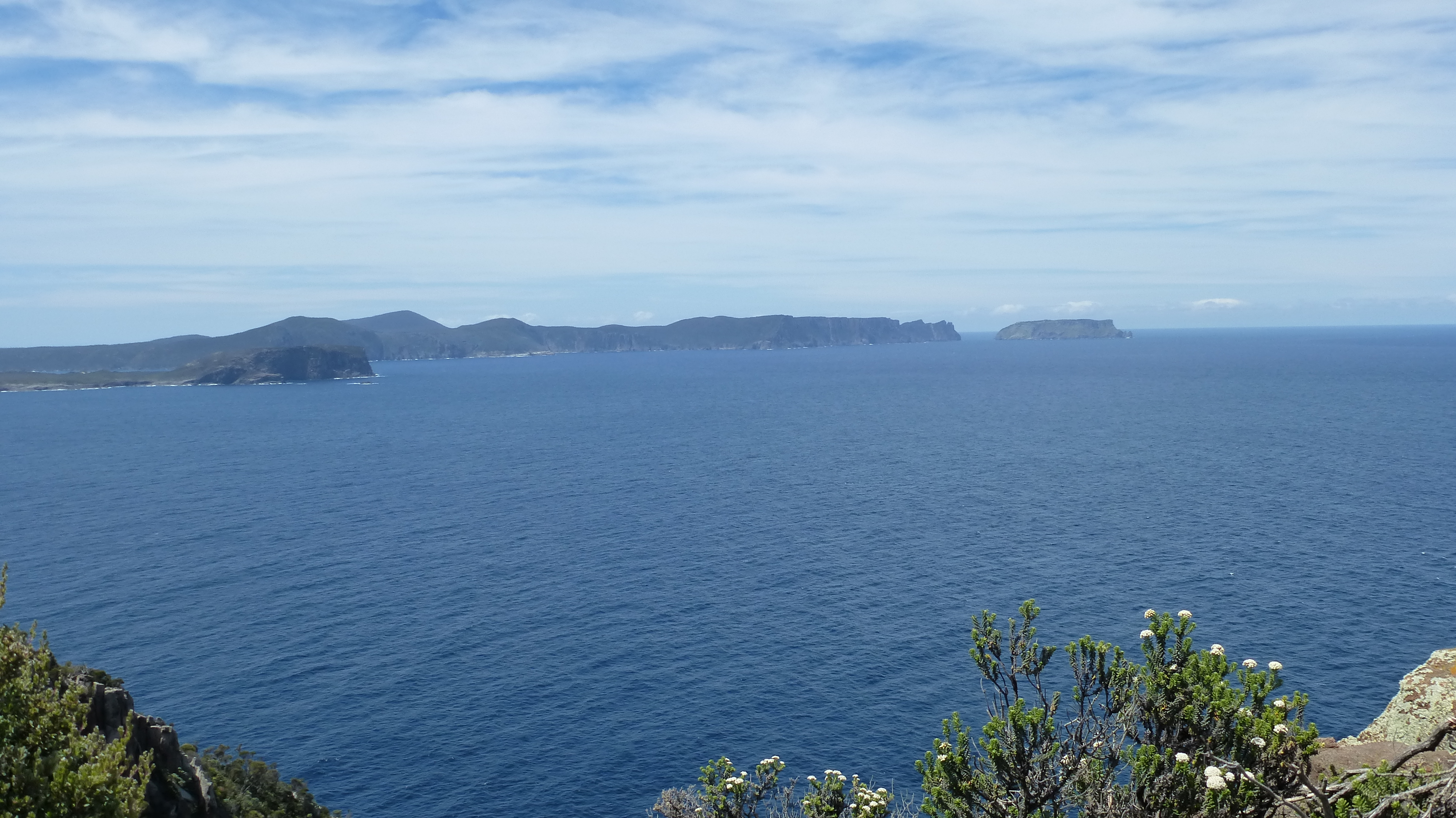
Tasman Island and Tasman Peninsula from Cape Raoul

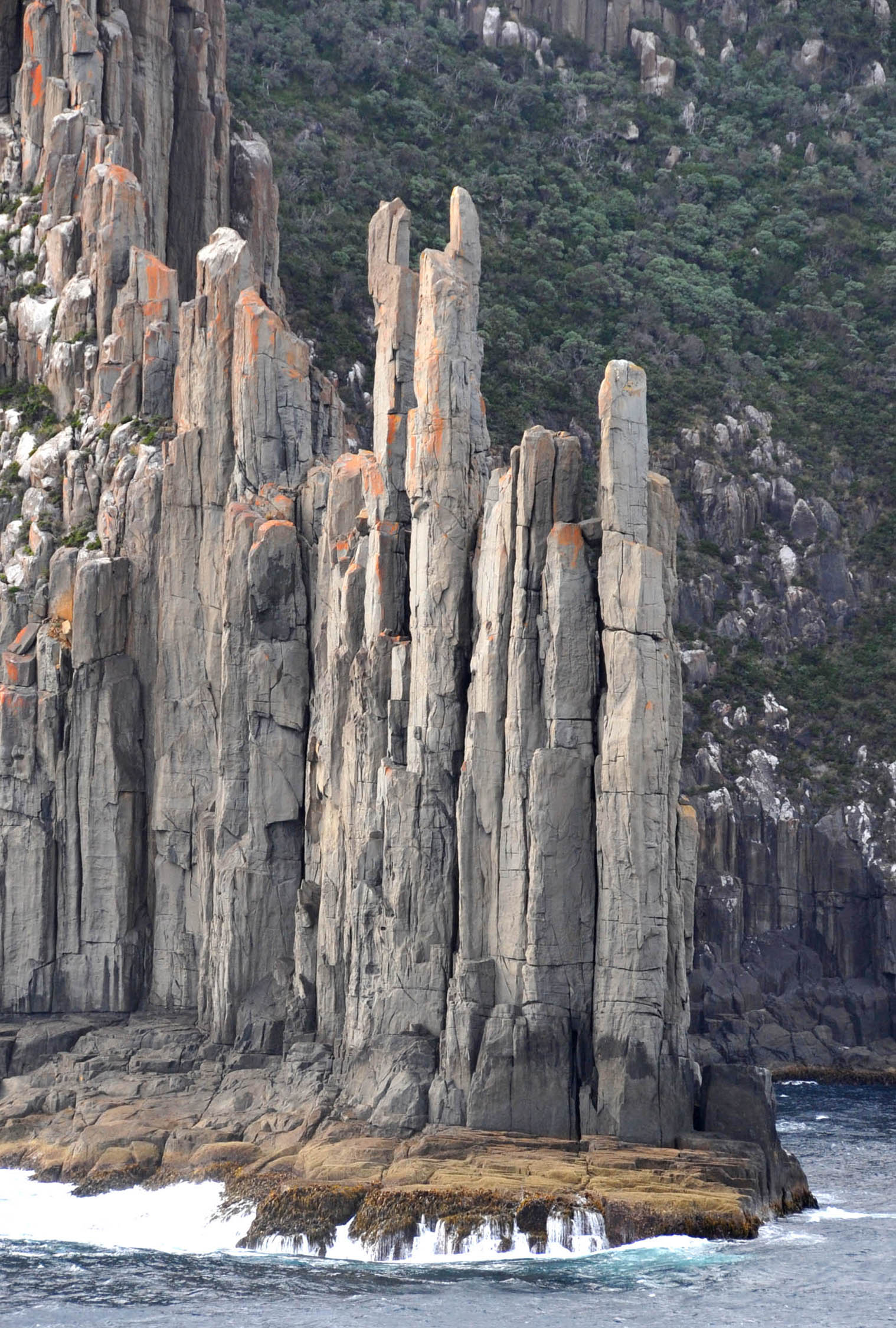
Tip of the cape from the sea

== See also ==
- Geography of Tasmania
