= Forestier Peninsula =

Peninsula in Tasmania, Australia

- Dolerite
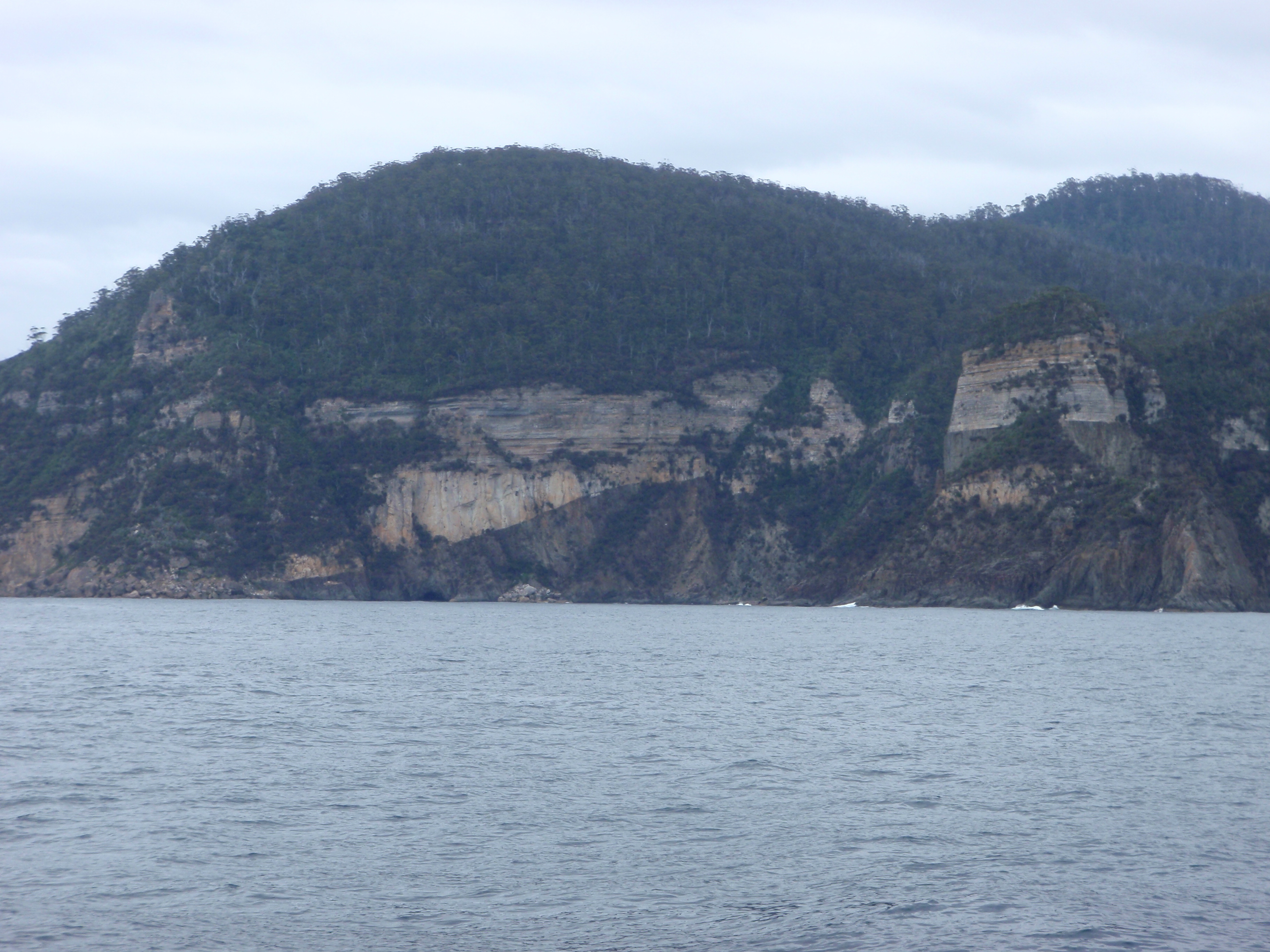
- The high yellow bluff on the Forestier Peninsula.

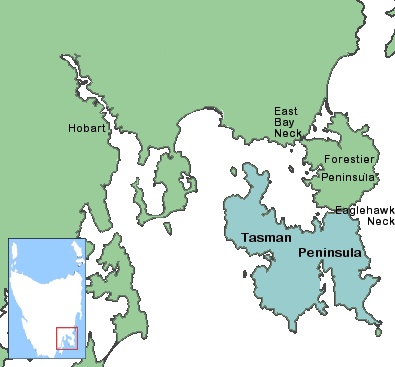
- Location in South-eastern Tasmania
- Coordinates: 42°55′48″S 147°54′00″E
- Location: South-eastern Tasmania, Australia

Area
  - Total: 300 km^{2} (120 sq mi)
- Designation: Tasman National Park (part)

The Forestier Peninsula is a peninsula located in south-east Tasmania, Australia, approximately 60 kilometres (37 mi) by the Arthur Highway, south-east of Hobart. The peninsula is connected to mainland Tasmania at East Bay Neck, near the town of Dunalley at its northern end. At Eaglehawk Neck, the southern end of the Forestier Peninsula is connected to the Tasman Peninsula.

== Location and features ==
The peninsula measures about 20 kilometres (12 mi) long by 15 kilometres (9.3 mi) wide, and is a part of the Tasman municipality. The east coast of the peninsula, facing the Tasman Sea is contained within the Tasman National Park.

Bay whaling activities were conducted in the coves of the peninsula in the 1830s and 1840s.

Located on Forestier Peninsula facing Norfolk Bay, Flinders Bay, 8 kilometres (5.0 mi) north west of Eaglehawk Neck, was once the site of a convict Probation Station which was established in 1841. The 200 convicts were involved in timber getting and land clearing. The station, beside the mouth of Flinders Creek, was short lived and closed within several years of establishment. The convicts were transferred to the penal settlement of Port Arthur.

The peninsula was severely impacted by the 2013 Tasmanian bushfires with significant property damage, particularly in and around the hamlet of Murdunna.

A historical survey map is available which outlines the geology and vegetation of the Tasman Peninsula, Forestier Peninsula and south east from Coal River

== See also ==
- Geography of Tasmania
