= Cape Raoul =

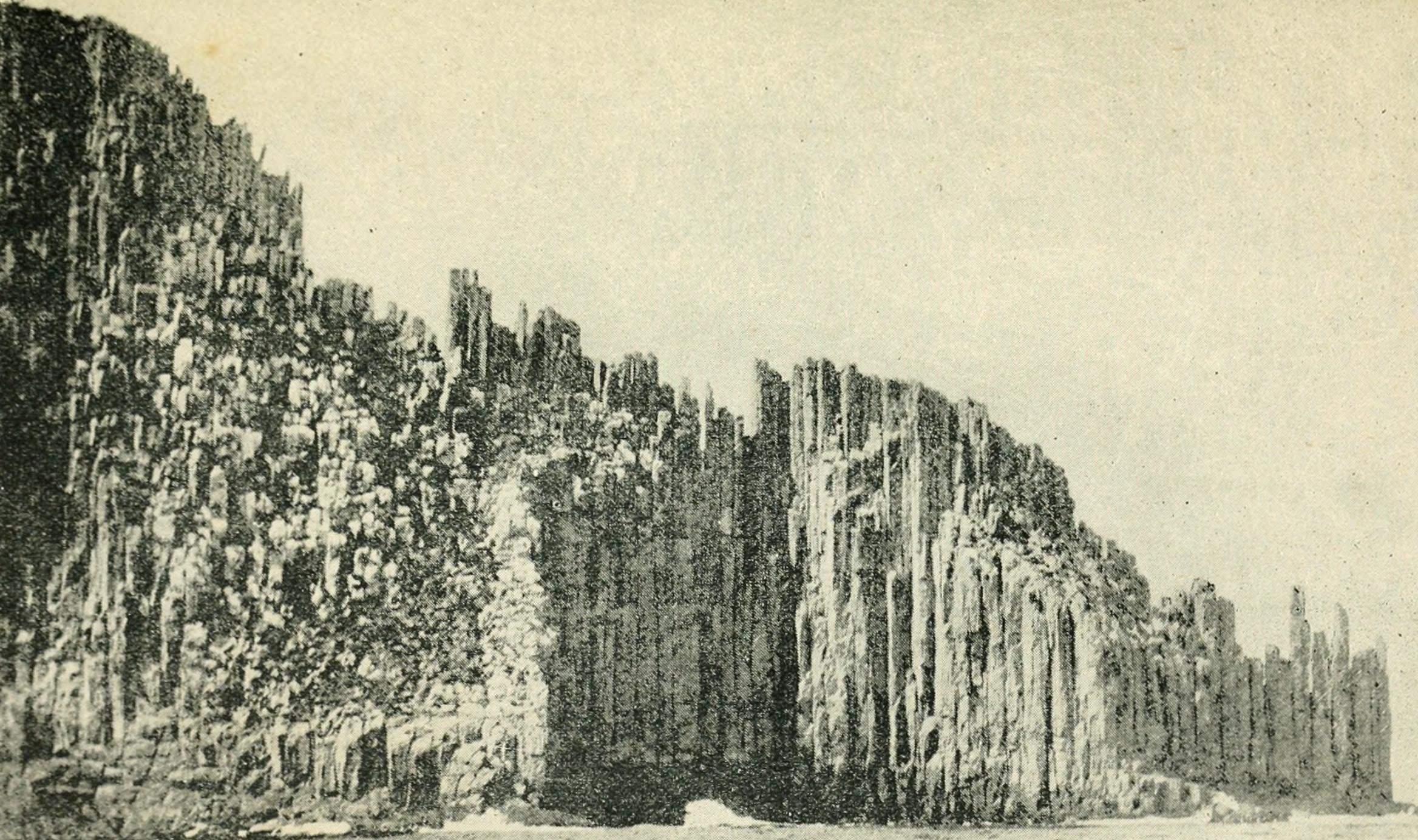
- Cape Raoul, Storm Bay, Tasmania. in 1892

- Coordinates: 43°12′04″S 147°45′48″E
- Country: Australia
- State: Tasmania
- Region: South-east
- LGA: Tasman
- Location: 13 km (8.1 mi) S of Nubeena

Government
  - State electorate: Lyons
  - Federal division: Lyons

Population
  - Total: nil (2016 census)
- Postcode: 7184
Localities around Cape Raoul
White Beach	White Beach, Stormlea	Port Arthur
Tasman Sea	Cape Raoul	Tasman Sea
Tasman Sea	Tasman Sea	Tasman Sea

Cape Raoul is a prominent cape with tall dolerite columns on the south coastline of the Tasman Peninsula, and the name of a rural locality. It sits with in the Tasman National Park and is about 13 kilometres (8.1 mi) south of the town of Nubeena.

It's popular with bushwalkers, and the dolerite column are notable for their beauty, and for being partially destroyed by the British Royal Navy in the late 1800s.

== Cape ==
Cape Raoul is a cape situated at the southernmost part of the Tasman Peninsula, in south eastern Tasmania. It forms the coastline of Raoul Bay, and is part of the dolerite landscape of the Tasman National Park. It's possible to reach by foot, and is one of Tasmania's 60 Great Short Walks. Part of the track is used to access Shipstern Bluff, a big wave surfing area which also gives good views of the Cape.

The cape features rock platforms, towering cliffs, columns and off-shore islands, including the Hippolyte Rocks. There is a 300-metre-high (980 ft) cliff with scenic views of the coastline. A 7-kilometre (4.3 mi) walking track there then descends steadily onto the Cape Raoul plateau, with the spectacular cape of dolerite columns at the end of the plateau.

The cape is accessed via Port Arthur at the end of Stormlea Road.

== Geography ==
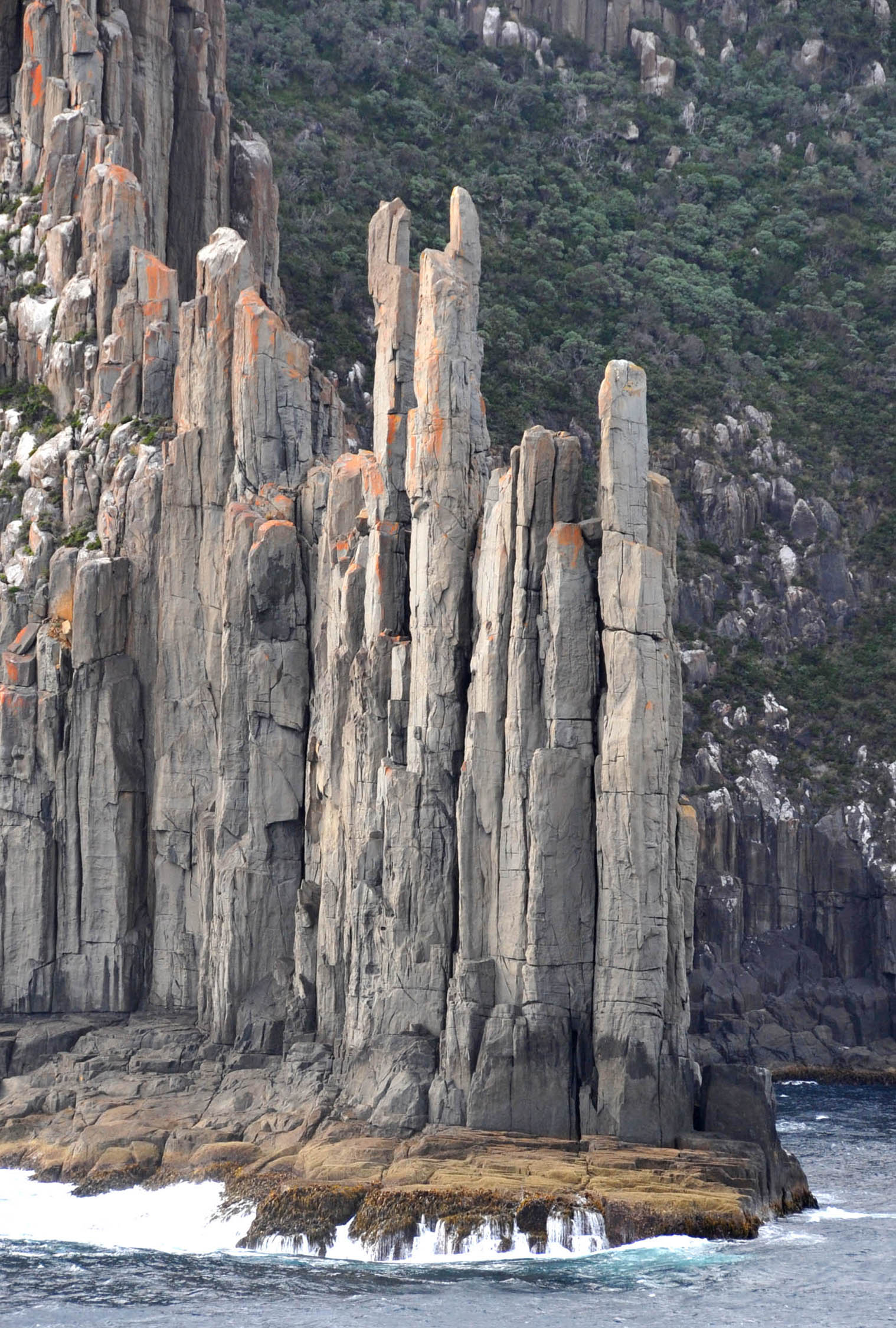
Tip of the cape from the sea

=== Columns ===
The columns at the cape are an example of Jurassic dolerite from an intrusion ~175 million years ago. They have formed into hexagons due to columnar jointing. This happens when a pool of magma cools at just the right rate so that as its surface contracts, it cracks into polygonal plates. The cracks accelerate the cooling, extending the cracks vertically, thereby forming columns. Dolerite columns are characteristic of Tasmanian geology, and are also seen on Mount Wellington's Organ Pipes, Cathedral Mountain and the surrounding sea cliffs of the Tasman Peninsula.

== History ==
=== Naming ===
The is no recorded Aboriginal name for Cape Raoul, however the Tasman Peninsula was called Tukana/Turrakana.

The Cape was named after Joseph Raoul, a sailor/pilot with Antoine Bruni d'Entrecasteaux who surveyed souther Tasmania (then Van Diemens Land) in 1793. Matthew Flinders had independently named it Basaltic Cape in 1798, but later replaced the name with Raoul once the map from the earlier French expedition was published.

=== Use as target practice by the British ===
A sketch of Cape Raoul in 1857 showing the taller and more numerous columns.

Newspapers in the late 1800s and early 1900s reported that the British Royal Navy used the columns as target practice, causing many to shorten and collapse into the sea. In 1882 The Mercury reported a "very unpleasant feeling among Tasmanians" at the news that the H.M.S Nelson would spend several days in Storm Bay for "shoot and shell practice" as several dolerite columns around Cape Raoul and Cape Pillar were "ruthlessly destroyed" by them on previous visits. An 1856 painting of the cape by Louisa Anne Meredith shows significantly more and higher columns than were later present.

In the summer the navy would visit the Tasmanian capital, Hobart for the Royal Hobart Regatta, and use the waters off south-eastern Tasmania for navy exercises and war games, as it provided sheltered waters with not much maritime traffic.

In the 1990s, geologist David Leaman noted that "radial shattering" on Cape Raoul were consistent with impact by non-explosive shells.

In 2007 bushwalkers found an unexploded shell on the peninsula which was manufactured between 1890 and 1905.

There were local rumours of the Australian navy using the cliff for target practice as late as the 1960s.

== Locality ==
The Cape Raoul locality is part of the Tasman Council, which covers the Tasman Peninsula. It extends along the coastline of the Tasman Sea and is located almost entirely within the SW section of Tasman National Park. As of 2016 it has a population of zero.

== Gallery ==
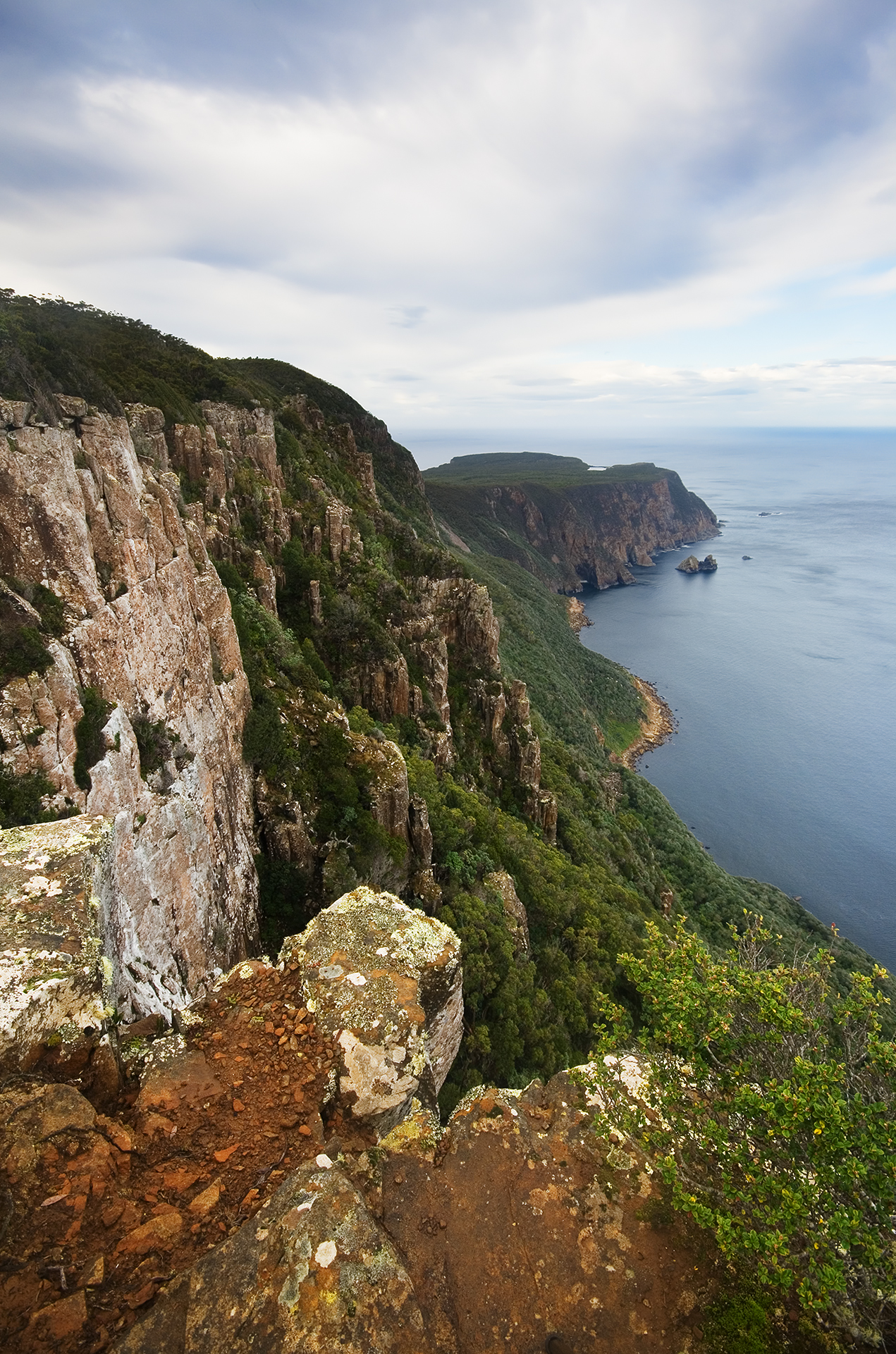
Dolerite columns of Cape Raoul

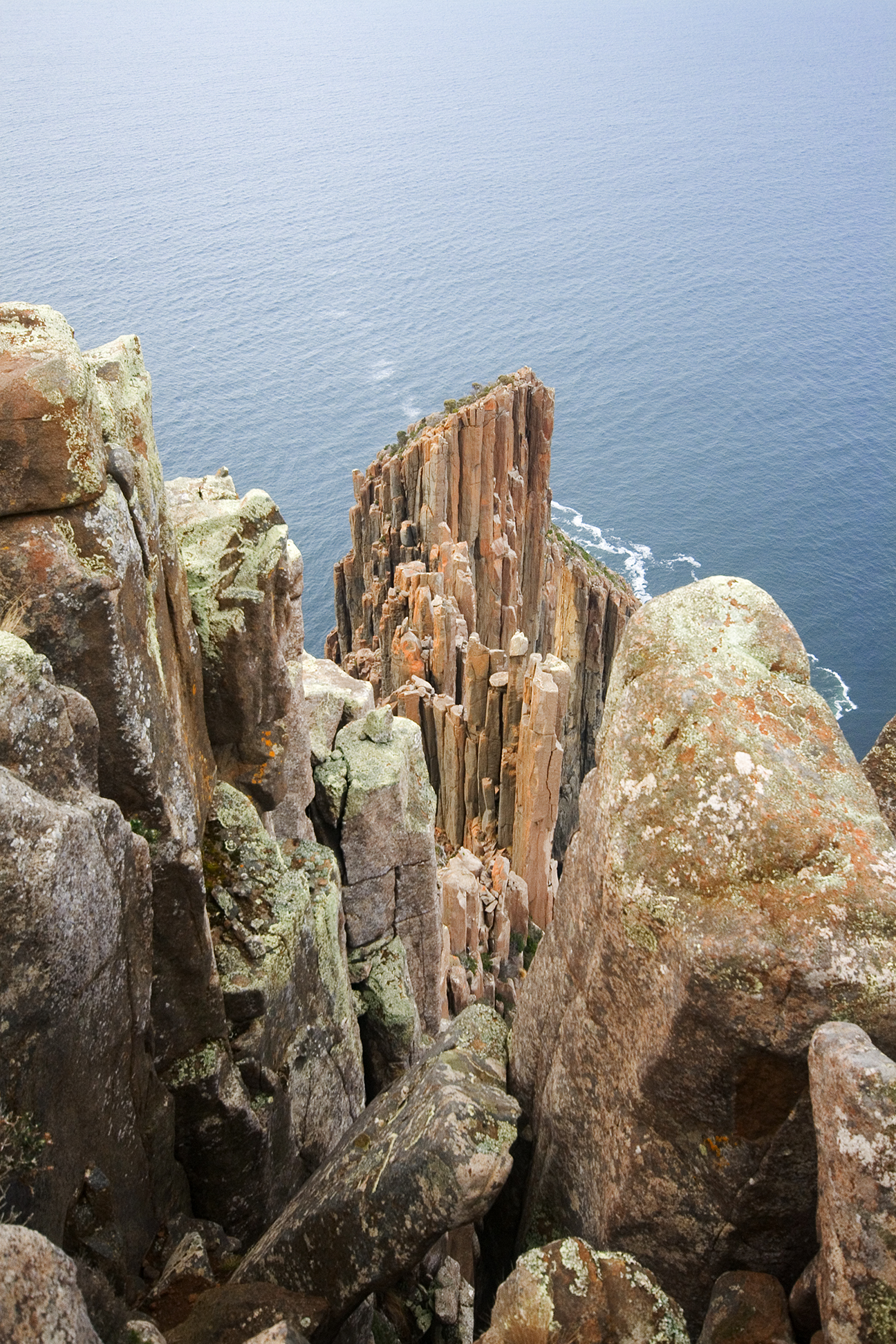
Columns at the tip of the cape

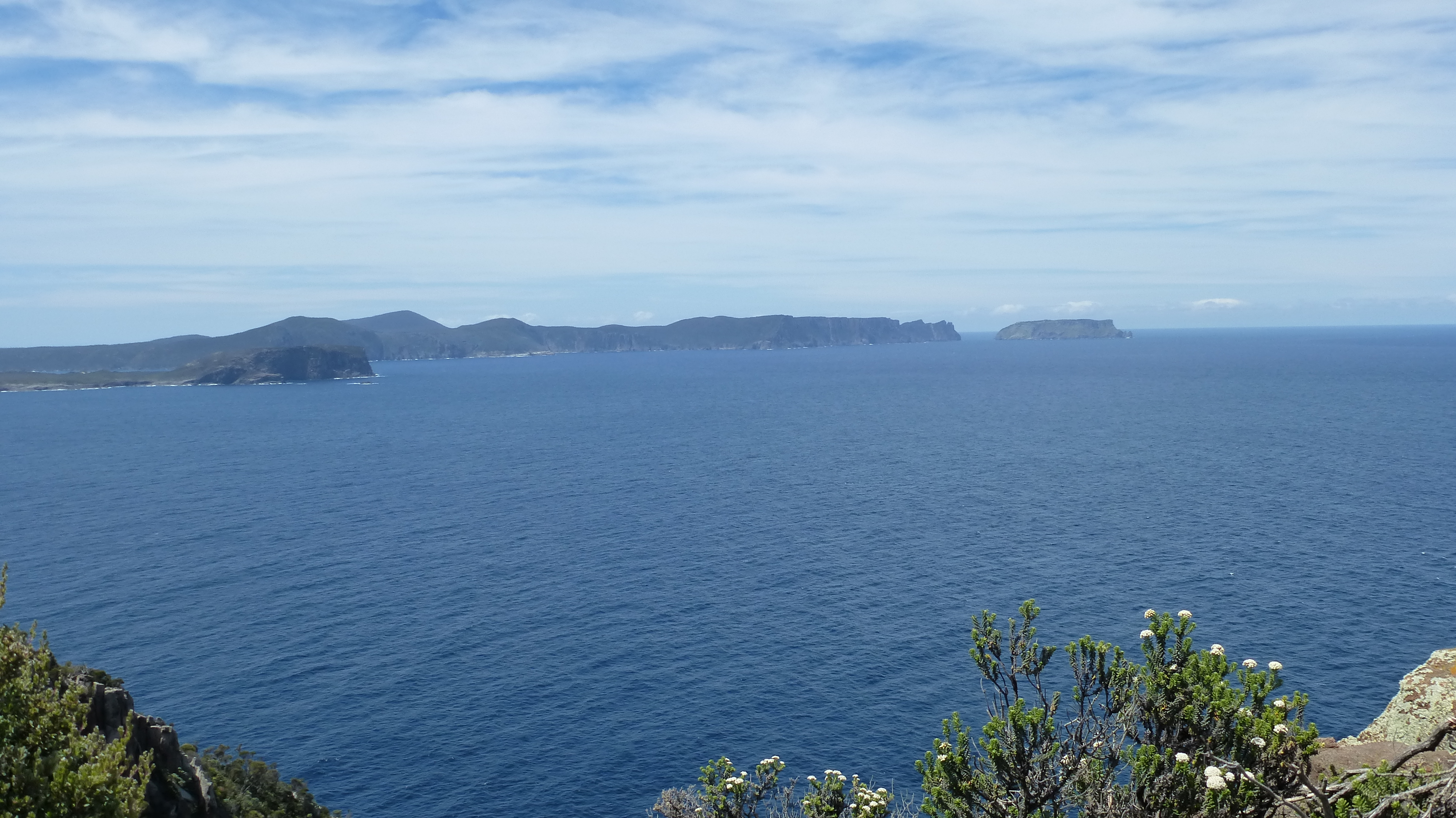
Tasman Island and Tasman Peninsula from Cape Raoul
