= Koonya, Tasmania =

Koonya
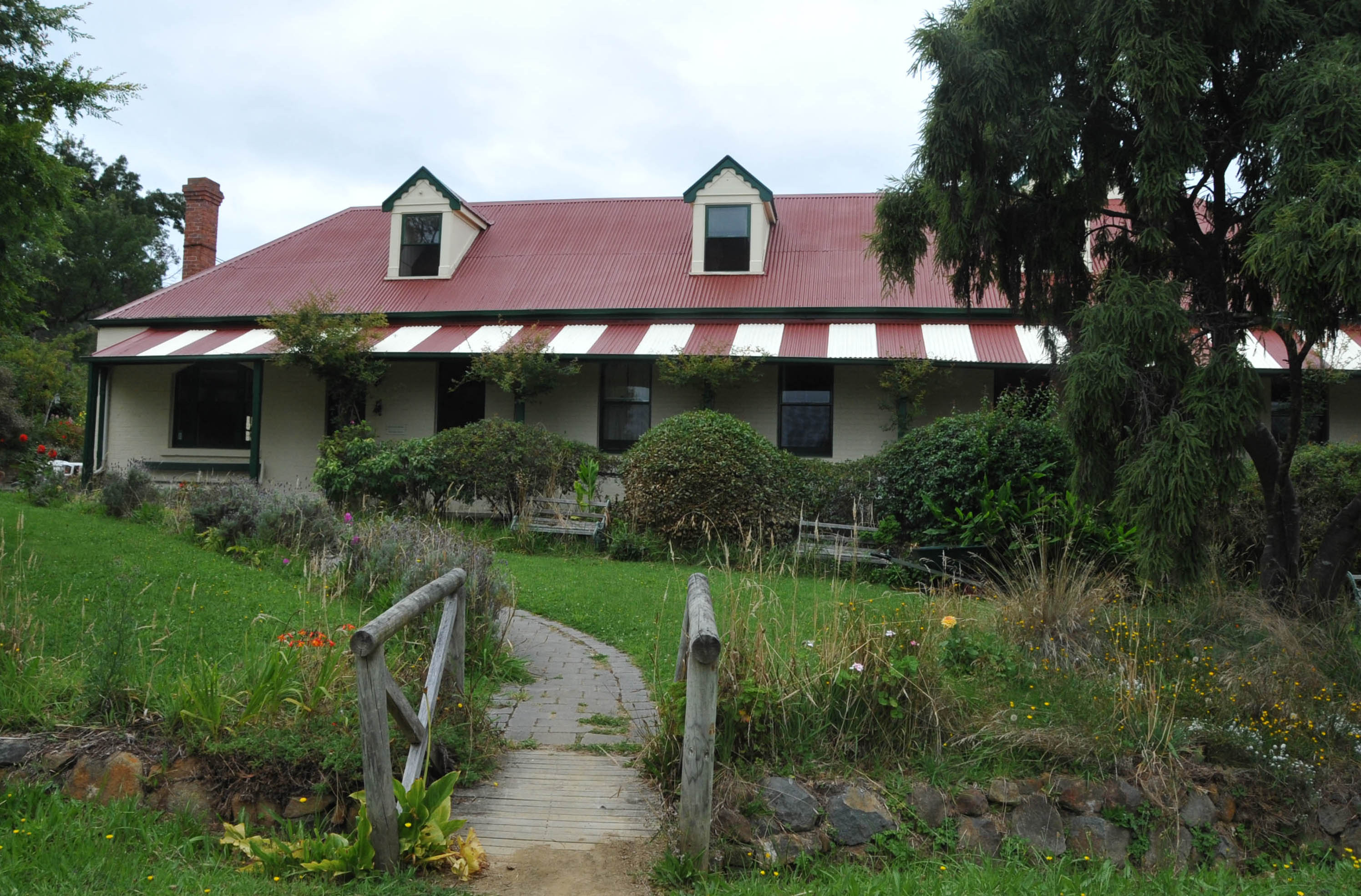
- Officers' quarters for the penal colony

- Coordinates: 43°06′S 147°45′E
- Country: Australia
- State: Tasmania
- Region: South-east
- LGA: Tasman
- Location: 18 km (11 mi) NE of Nubeena

Government
  - State electorate: Lyons
  - Federal division: Lyons

Population
  - Total: 134 (2016 census)
- Postcode: 7184
Localities around Koonya
Norfolk Bay	Norfolk Bay	Taranna
Premaydena	Koonya	Taranna
Nubeena	Port Arthur	Port Arthur

Koonya is a rural locality in the local government area (LGA) of Tasman in the South-east LGA region of Tasmania. The locality is about 18 kilometres (11 mi) north-east of the town of Nubeena. The 2016 census recorded a population of 134 for the state suburb of Koonya. It hosts the annual Koonya Garlic Festival, a "one-day celebration".

== History ==
The area was formerly known as Cascades, but had been changed by 1888. Koonya was gazetted as a locality in 1968. The name is believed to be an Aboriginal word, but the meaning is disputed.

It was established in 1841 as one of outlying parts of the network of penal colony sites centered on Port Arthur. Under its former name of "Cascades", it was populated by at least 400 convicts.

After the Port Arthur penal colony was closed, and Van Diemen's Land was renamed "Tasmania", a number of places in Tasmania were renamed; "Cascades" was renamed "Koonya".

== Geography ==
The waters of Norfolk Bay form most of the northern boundary.

== Access and facilities ==
Route B37 (Nubeena Road) enters from the north-east and runs through to the north-west, where it exits. Route C343 (Nubeena Back Road) starts at an intersection with B37 and runs south-west until it exits.

A weather radar for the City of Hobart is located in the Koonya area.

St. Alban's Catholic church is served from St. John's Catholic Parish, based in Richmond.
