= Highcroft, Tasmania =

Highcroft
- Town
- Coordinates: 43°09′04″S 147°46′00″E
- Country: Australia
- State: Tasmania
- Region: South-east
- LGA: Tasman
- Location: 7 km (4.3 mi) S of Nubeena

Government
  - State electorate: Lyons
  - Federal division: Lyons

Population
  - Total: 45 (2016 census)
- Postcode: 7183
Localities around Highcroft
Nubeena	Nubeena	Port Arthur
White Beach	Highcroft	Port Arthur
White Beach	Stormlea	Port Arthur

Highcroft is a rural locality in the local government area (LGA) of Tasman in the South-east LGA region of Tasmania. The locality is about 7 kilometres (4.3 mi) south of the town of Nubeena. The 2016 census recorded a population of 45 for the state suburb of Highcroft.

== History ==
Highcroft was gazetted as a locality in 1968.

== Geography ==
Almost all of the boundaries are survey lines.

== Road infrastructure ==
Route B37 (Nubeena Road) passes to the north. From there, Stormlea Road provides access to the locality.
