= Stormlea, Tasmania =

Stormlea
- Town
- Coordinates: 43°11′32″S 147°46′28″E
- Country: Australia
- State: Tasmania
- Region: South-east
- LGA: Tasman
- Location: 12 km (7.5 mi) S of Nubeena

Government
  - State electorate: Lyons
  - Federal division: Lyons

Population
  - Total: 36 (2016 census)
- Postcode: 7184
Localities around Stormlea
White Beach	Highcroft	Port Arthur
White Beach	Stormlea	Port Arthur
Cape Raoul	Cape Raoul	Cape Raoul

Stormlea is a rural locality in the local government area (LGA) of Tasman in the South-east LGA region of Tasmania. The locality is about 12 kilometres (7.5 mi) south of the town of Nubeena. The 2016 census recorded a population of 36 for the state suburb of Stormlea.

== History ==
Stormlea was gazetted as a locality in 1968. Prior to 1930 it was known as Pootark, which is believed to be an Aboriginal word for "cave".

== Geography ==
Almost all of the boundaries are survey lines.

== Road infrastructure ==
Route B37 (Nubeena Road) passes to the north. From there, Stormlea Road provides access to the locality.
