= Fortescue, Tasmania =

Fortescue
- Town
- Coordinates: 43°06′22″S 147°55′44″E
- Country: Australia
- State: Tasmania
- Region: South-east
- LGA: Tasman
- Location: 21 km (13 mi) E of Nubeena

Government
  - State electorate: Lyons
  - Federal division: Lyons

Population
  - Total: nil (2016 census)
- Postcode: 7182
Localities around Fortescue
Eaglehawk Neck	Eaglehawk Neck	Tasman Sea
Taranna, Port Arthur	Fortescue	Tasman Sea
Cape Pillar	Cape Pillar	Tasman Sea

Fortescue is a rural locality in the local government area of Tasman in the South-east region of Tasmania. It is located about 21 kilometres (13 mi) east of the town of Nubeena. The 2016 census determined a population of nil for the state suburb of Fortescue.

== History ==
Fortescue is a confirmed locality.

== Geography ==
The shore of the Tasman Sea is the eastern boundary. Part of Tasman National Park is within the locality.

== Road infrastructure ==
The C344 route (Fortescue Road) enters from the west and runs through to the south-east, where it ends.
