= Saltwater River, Tasmania =

Saltwater River
- Town
- Coordinates: 43°01′07″S 147°42′27″E
- Country: Australia
- State: Tasmania
- Region: South-east
- LGA: Tasman
- Location: 14 km (8.7 mi) N of Nubeena

Government
  - State electorate: Lyons
  - Federal division: Lyons

Population
  - Total: 123 (2016 census)
- Postcode: 7186
Localities around Saltwater River
Sloping Main	Sloping Main	Norfolk Bay
Sloping Main	Saltwater River	Norfolk Bay, Premaydena
Nubeena	Nubeena	Nubeena

Saltwater River is a rural locality in the local government area (LGA) of Tasman in the South-east LGA region of Tasmania. The locality is about 14 kilometres (8.7 mi) north of the town of Nubeena. The 2016 census recorded a population of 123 for the state suburb of Saltwater River.

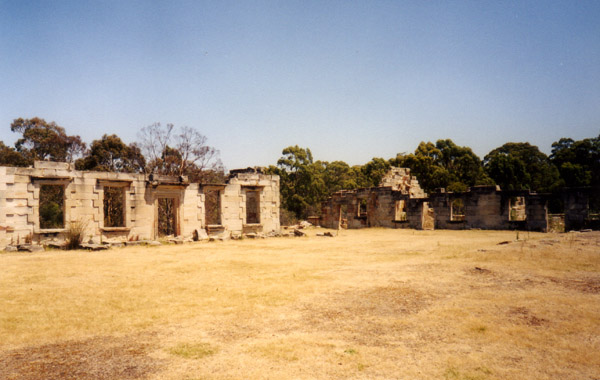
Ruins in Saltwater River

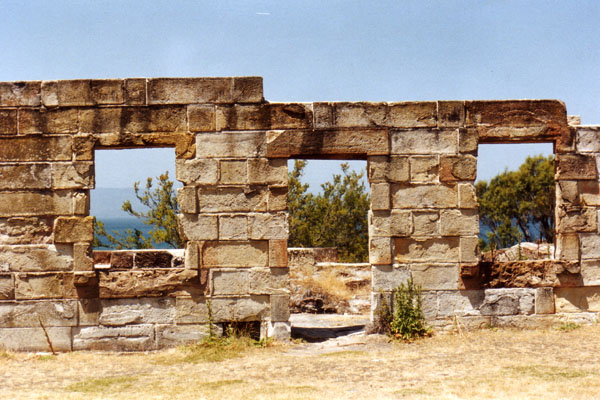
Ruins in Saltwater River

== History ==
Saltwater River was gazetted as a locality in 1967.

Saltwater River (also known as Saltwater Creek) is a former penal colony on the Tasman Peninsula in Tasmania, Australia. It is 23 kilometres (14 mi) from Port Arthur, and 106 kilometres (66 mi) from Hobart.

The Saltwater River area contained two penal settlements. One was an agricultural settlement, which produced vegetables, wheat, and had a piggery. The other was a coal mine, known amongst convicts for its hellish conditions. It is now on the Australian National Heritage List as the Coal Mines Historic Site. Today, only ruins exist at the site, which include underground cells.

Saltwater River Post Office opened on 1 December 1878 and closed in 1970.

== Geography ==
The waters of Norfolk Bay form the north-eastern boundary.

== Road infrastructure ==
Route C341 (Saltwater River Road) enters from the east and runs to the north, where it ends.
