= Charles O'Hara Booth =

Commandant of Port Arthur penal settlement

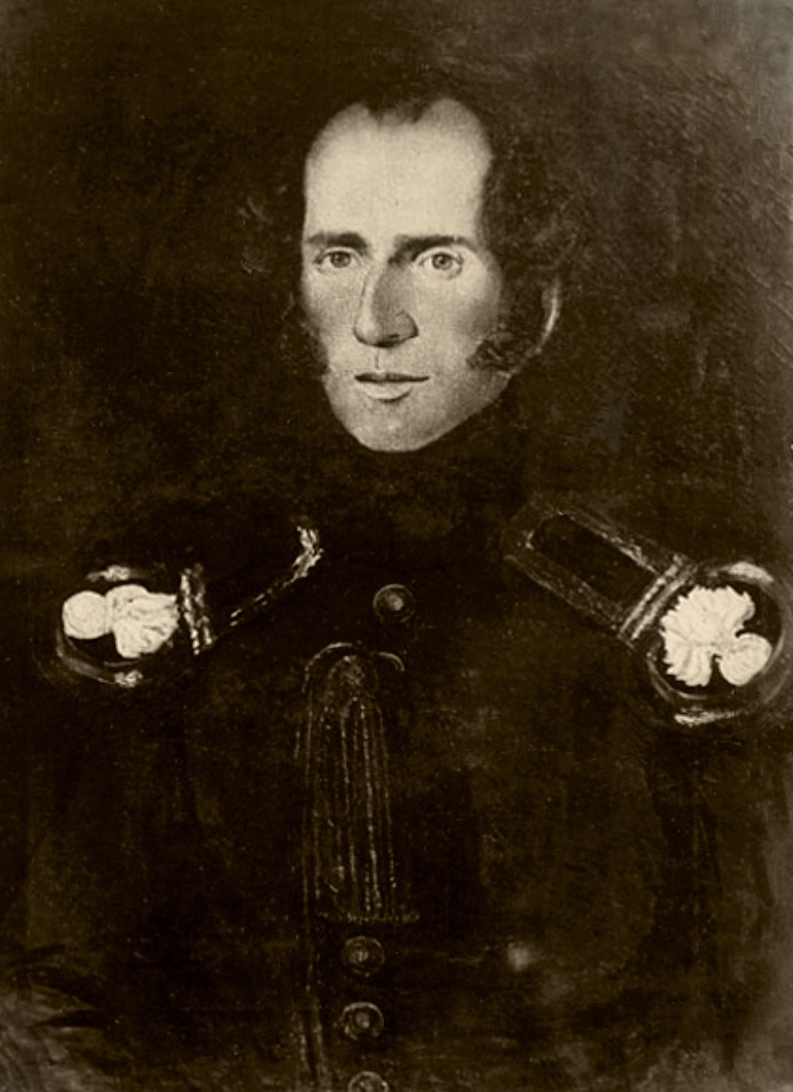
- Booth in his uniform as a captain of the 21st (Royal North British Fusilier) Regiment of Foot
- Born: 31 August 1800
- Died: 11 August 1851 (aged 50)
- Allegiance: United Kingdom
- Branch: British Army
- Commands: 21st (Royal North British Fusilier) Regiment of Foot; 53rd (Shropshire) Regiment of Foot

Charles O'Hara Booth (31 August 1800 – 11 August 1851), was an English-born army officer who served in India, the West Indies and England for a total of 18 years before being posted to Van Diemen's Land, Australia (later to be named Tasmania). He remained there for a further 18 years, first as commandant of Port Arthur penal settlement and subsequently as the head of an orphan's school.

In 1815, aged 15, he was sent by his parents to India in the care of an uncle. The following year he joined the 53rd Regiment as an ensign. Three years later he returned to England and applied for a commission in the 21st Fusiliers. From 1820 to 1827 he served in the West Indies before returning to England. With the rank of captain, in 1833 he arrived with his regiment in Van Diemen's Land. He was soon appointed commandant of the principal convict settlement, Port Arthur, and he also controlled all convict stations on the Tasman Peninsula. His position gave him entrée to the upper levels of Van Diemen's Land's small, exclusive society, in which he quickly became well-liked and respected.

In 1840, changes in penal organisation under the probation system (Note: The Probation System was an experiment in penal discipline introduced in 1839 and modified several times after 1846. It was abandoned altogether following the abolition of transportation to Van Diemen's Land in 1853. Its predecessor, the assignment system, in which convicts were assigned to settlers in due course, had combined punishment and reform and suited the settlers' economic interests. But in Britain it was seen as too inconsistent: the treatment of assigned convicts depended on the character of their masters rather than the nature of their crimes – neither reforming the prisoner nor deterring potential offenders in Britain. Probation involved both punishment and reform, achieved by separate confinement and hard labour, religious instruction and education, and punishment with a just but dread certainty. Convicts started with a period of confinement and labour in gangs at a probation station or at a penal settlement for life-sentenced prisoners. If they progressed satisfactorily through several stages of decreasing severity, they received a probation pass and became available for hire to the settlers. Sustained good conduct eventually led to a ticket-of-leave or a pardon. More than 80 probation stations were in operation. Poor planning and administration, inadequate funding, huge numbers, and an unforeseen economic depression caused the probation system to fail. The convicts' misery increased; for the colonists, having more convicts in the community added to their corrupting influence out of proportion to their economic contribution. The failure turned the majority of colonists into implacable opponents of transportation itself.) confined his jurisdiction to Port Arthur and the adjacent juvenile establishment at Point Puer. Under his command the township of Port Arthur was laid out, small harbours were constructed and swamps reclaimed, a government farm was set up, a convict-powered tramway was constructed, and a semaphore-signal telegraph system was established for faster communications, especially to capture escaped prisoners.

== Reputation and achievement ==
Booth was an impartial and efficient administrator, as prompt to reward as to punish. Lieutenant-Governor George Arthur described him as "kind and humane, active and most determined". He was regarded as severe but just in his treatment of convicts, but he was also accused of being insensitive about individual problems in his zeal to treat all prisoners equally.

In a departure from the focus on severe punishment that characterised penal practices at the time, Booth's initiatives at the juvenile reformatory, Point Puer, separated young prisoners from older, more hardened convicts and gave them special attention and trade training so that the cycle of criminal behaviour could be broken. The reformatory was described as "an oasis in the desert of penal government".

== Personal tragedy ==
In 1838 Booth and a convict assistant, Joseph Turner, became lost in the dense bush of Forestier Peninsula. After they became separated, Turner found a settler who raised the alarm; a large search party was assembled. Booth survived four nights in cold wet autumn weather, suffering exposure, weak with hunger and with only his dogs for company. One of the dogs spotted a searcher and took him to Booth, who was frostbitten and too weak to call out. He never fully recovered from the ordeal.

== Later years ==
In November of the same year, Booth married Elizabeth Charlotte Eagle, the 19-year-old stepdaughter of the regiment's surgeon. His health did not improve and his interest turned to family life; his enthusiasm for the convict settlement declined and he retired from the army in 1839 or 1840. He remained at Port Arthur until, in 1844, he was appointed superintendent of the Queens Orphan School in New Town, a suburb of Hobart. He died suddenly from a heart attack at his home in New Town on 11 August 1851, aged 50. His wife and two daughters returned to England in 1852.
