= White Beach =

- Town
- Coordinates: 43°07′27″S 147°43′13″E
- Country: Australia
- State: Tasmania
- Region: South-east
- LGA: Tasman
- Location: 6 km (3.7 mi) SW of Nubeena

Government
  - State electorate: Lyons
  - Federal division: Lyons

Population
  - Total: 276 (2016 census)
- Postcode: 7184
Localities around White Beach
Storm Bay	Storm Bay, Nubeena	Storm Bay, Nubeena
Storm Bay	White Beach	Highcroft, Stormlea
Storm Bay	Cape Raoul	Stormlea

White Beach is a rural locality in the local government area (LGA) of Tasman in the South-east LGA region of Tasmania. The locality is about 6 kilometres (3.7 mi) south-west of the town of Nubeena. The 2016 census recorded a population of 276 for the state suburb of White Beach.

== History ==
White Beach is a confirmed locality.

== Geography ==
The waters of Storm Bay form the western to north-eastern boundaries.

== Road infrastructure ==
Route B37 (Nubeena Road) passes to the north-east. From there, White Beach Road provides access to the locality.
