= Sloping Main, Tasmania =

Sloping Main Tasmania
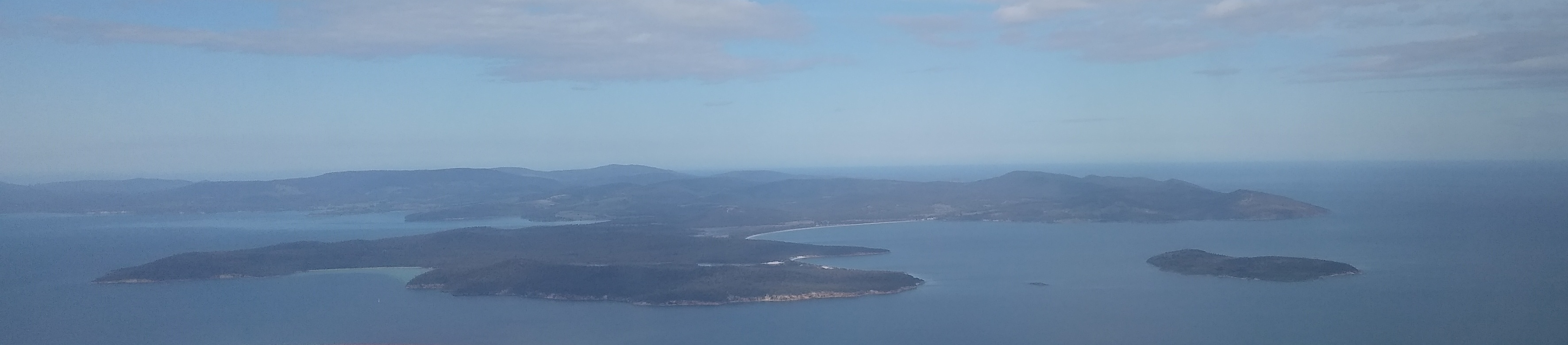
- Aerial view of Sloping Main and surrounding area

- Coordinates: 43°00′47″S 147°40′16″E
- Population: 47 (2016 census)
- Postcode(s): 7186
- Location: 22 km (14 mi) NW of Nubeena
- LGA(s): Tasman
- Region: South-east
- State electorate(s): Lyons
- Federal division(s): Lyons
Localities around Sloping Main:
Frederick Henry Bay	Frederick Henry Bay	Frederick Henry Bay
Frederick Henry Bay	Sloping Main	Saltwater River
Nubeena	Nubeena	Saltwater River

Sloping Main is a rural locality in the local government area (LGA) of Tasman in the South-east LGA region of Tasmania. The locality is about 22 kilometres (14 mi) north-west of the town of Nubeena. The 2021 census recorded a population of 47 for the state suburb of Sloping Main.

== History ==
Slopen Mane is a confirmed locality.

== Geography ==
The waters of Frederick Henry Bay form the western to north-eastern boundaries.

== Road infrastructure ==
Route C341 (Coal Mine Road) provides access to the locality.
