= Convict tramway =

Wooden-railed tramway in Tasmania with convict motive power

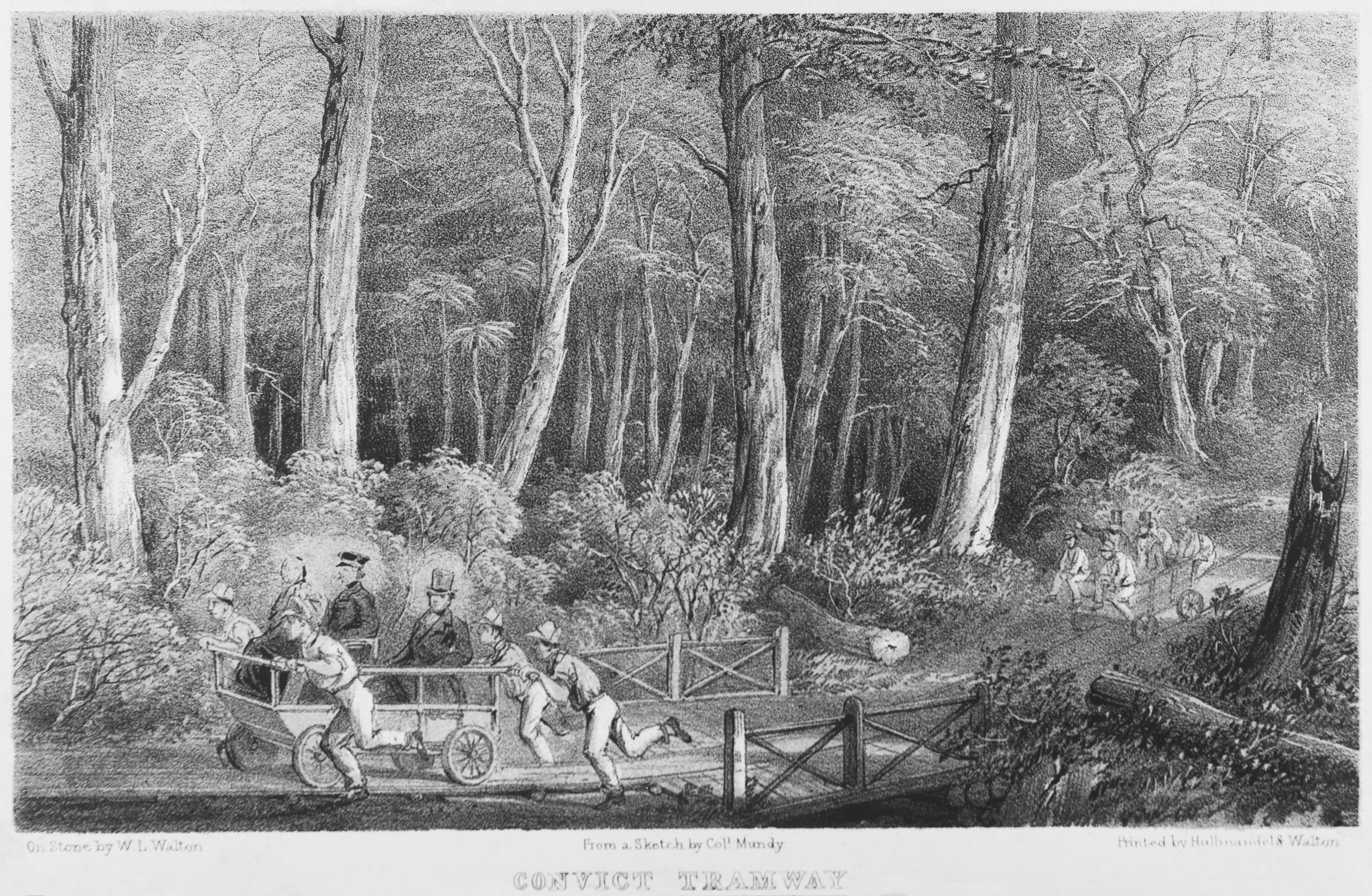
A contemporary sketch of the convict tramway

The 19th-century convict tramway, in Tasmania, used trusted prisoners from the Port Arthur convict settlement as motive power. Constructed to bypass the hazardous sea voyage from Hobart to Port Arthur, it was the first "railed way" in Australia to carry passengers and general freight. (Note: The term "railed way" refers to a configuration that preceded those of full-scale railways. The timber rails of the line, for example, were inadequate for speeds higher than those of running men or weights of more than half a ton; and carts were not coupled together.)

The line, of unknown gauge, was constructed under the supervision of the penal settlement's commandant, Captain Charles O'Hara Booth. Opened in 1836, it ran for 8 kilometres (5 miles) from Oakwood to Taranna. An unconfirmed report said that the line continued to Eaglehawk Neck; if this were so, its length would have been more than doubled.

The tramway carried freight, with a capacity of half a ton, and passengers, on wooden rails. The track formation was not levelled but followed the natural elevation of the ground; on descending a hill the runners were permitted to ride on the vehicle. One team of convicts – usually three in number – could complete up to three round trips per day, carrying freight in both directions. If he proved trustworthy, a convict was eventually rewarded with permission to access less restricted parts of the colony.

The date of the line's closure is unknown; the penal settlement closed in 1877.
