= Premaydena =

- Town
- Coordinates: 43°03′23″S 147°45′30″E
- Country: Australia
- State: Tasmania
- Region: South-east
- LGA: Tasman
- Location: 7 km (4.3 mi) N of Nubeena

Government
  - State electorate: Lyons
  - Federal division: Lyons

Population
  - Total: 99 (2016 census)
- Postcode: 7185
Localities around Premaydena
Saltwater River	Norfolk Bay	Norfolk Bay
Saltwater River	Premaydena	Koonya
Nubeena	Nubeena	Koonya

Premaydena is a rural locality in the local government area of Tasman in the South-east region of Tasmania. The locality is about 7 kilometres (4.3 mi) north of the town of Nubeena. The 2016 census recorded a population of 99 for the state suburb of Premaydena.

== History ==
Premaydena was gazetted as a locality in 1967.

It was the site of a convict settlement. It was once known as Impression Bay.

A digital scan of a painting of Impression Bay station at Premaydena, dated approximately 1845, is freely available online to the public.

== Geography ==
The shore of Norfolk Bay forms the northern boundary.

== Road infrastructure ==
The B37 route (Nubeena Road) enters from the north-east and runs through to the south, where it exits. Route C341 (Saltwater River Road) starts at an intersection with B37 in the north and runs north-west until it exits.
