= Boxalls Bay =

Coordinates: 43°00′28″S 147°50′42″E

Boxalls Bay is a small bay located on the western side of the Forestier Peninsula, facing Norfolk Bay. It lies south of Tinpot Island and North of Eaglehawk Neck.
