= Tasman Council =

- Local government area
- Interactive map of Tasman Council
- Coordinates: 43.0538°S 147.8342°E
- Country: Australia
- State: Tasmania
- Region: South East Tasmania, Australia
- Established: 1 January 1907
- Council seat: Nubeena

Government
  - Mayor: Rod Macdonald {{{1}}}
  - State electorate: Lyons
  - Federal division: Lyons

Area
  - Total: 660 km^{2} (250 sq mi)

Population
  - Total: 2,404 (2018)
  - Density: 3.642/km^{2} (9.43/sq mi)
- Website: Tasman Council
LGAs around Tasman Council
| Sorell | Sorell | Tasman Sea |
| Frederick Henry Bay | Tasman Council | Tasman Sea |
| Storm Bay | Tasman Sea | Tasman Sea |

Tasman Council is a local government body in Tasmania, situated in the south-east of the state. Tasman is classified as a rural local government area and has a population of 2,404, the region covers both the Tasman and Forestier peninsulas, with Nubeena the principal town.

== History and attributes ==
The Tasman municipality was established on 1 January 1907. Tasman is classified as rural, agricultural and medium (RAM) under the Australian Classification of Local Governments.

Port Arthur, Nubeena and Taranna are the main towns. The local government area contains the Tasman National Park and a large range of tourism sites including the former penal settlement of Port Arthur, now one of the eleven Australian Convict Sites listed on the World Heritage Register; Eaglehawk Neck and the Tessellated Pavement amongst many others.

== Localities ==
• Cape Pillar • Cape Raoul • Dunalley • Eaglehawk Neck • Fortescue • Highcroft • Koonya • Murdunna • Nubeena • Port Arthur • Premaydena • Saltwater River • Sloping Main • Stormlea • Taranna • White Beach

== Council ==
=== Current composition and election method ===
Tasman Council is composed of seven councillors elected using the Hare-Clark system of proportional representation as a single ward. All councillors are elected for a fixed four-year term of office. The mayor and deputy mayor are each directly elected for a four-year term. The mayor and deputy mayor must also be elected as councillors in order to hold office. Elections are normally held in October, with the next election due to be held in October 2018. Neither the Labor Party nor the Liberal Party endorse local government candidates in Tasmania.

The most recent election of councillors was held in October 2022, and the makeup of the council is as follows:

| Party | Councillors |
|---|---|
| Independents and Unaligned | 6 |
| Tasmanian Greens | 1 |
| Total | 7 |

The current Council, elected in 2022, is:

| Councillor | Party | Notes |
|---|---|---|
| Rod Macdonald | Independent | Mayor |
| Maria Stacey | Independent | Deputy mayor |
| Angela Knott | Tasmanian Greens | |
| Hannah Fielder | Independent | |
| Kelly Spaulding | Independent | Former mayor defeated in 2022 election |
| Jim Sharman | Independent | |
| Daniel Kelleher | Independent | |

== See also ==
- Local government areas of Tasmania
