= Simon Alexander Fraser =

Simon Fraser
- Born: Simon Alexander Fraser; 13 February 1845; Port Arthur, Van Diemen's Land
- Died: 17 April 1934 (aged 89); Mansfield, Victoria, Australia
- Occupations: Stock rider; whip-maker; bagpiper
- Spouse: Florence MacMillan (m. 1872)
- Children: 8: Jack Fraser (son); Hugh Fraser (son)
- Parents: Hugh Archibald Fraser (father); Mary née Anderson (mother)
- Relatives: Charles MacArthur (great grandfather)

Simon Alexander Fraser (13 February 1845 – 17 April 1934) was an Australian bagpiper, stock rider, and whip-maker of Scottish descent. With his wife Florence (née MacMillan) and five of their children, the Fraser's family musical group toured Victoria and between them provided clarinet, piccolo, piano, two violins and flute. They played at Government House. As a whip-maker Fraser "wove forty-four strands into the longest whip that had been made in Australia."

== Early life ==
Fraser was born on a boat in Port Arthur, Van Diemen's Land, on 13 February 1845, the eldest son of twelve children. His father, Hugh Archibald Fraser (1796 – 1895), a Scottish magistrate, migrated to New South Wales in 1828.

Hugh lived at River Hunter Valley. Working as a farmer, he lost most of his money within fifteen years, owing to bad crops, and heavy partying and betting. It is claimed that Hugh had relatives with the Campbells of Lorn. Hugh became an overseer at Port Arthur's penal settlement in the 1840s. Fraser's mother, Mary Fraser (née Anderson, 1827 – 1899) was descended from the MacCrimmons family, traditional pipers to the clan MacLeod and she was a granddaughter of Charles MacArthur, a Scottish bagpiper.

The Fraser family relocated to Barwite, Victoria (near Mansfield) when he was a child. He spent most of his life living in the district. He took bagpipe lessons from Peter Bruce in Benalla, 64 kilometres (40 mi) away, riding his horse each way. Later he made his own bagpipes and was reputedly, "the first to use kangaroo-skin in preference to the traditional sheep-skin", he won championship contests in playing, throughout Australia. As a stock rider, with his brothers, he would drove sheep from Mansfield to Melbourne. He learnt whip making from local Aboriginal stock man, Nangus Jack. Fraser "wove forty-four strands into the longest whip that had been made in Australia."

== Career and personal life ==
Fraser married Florence MacMillan, a Scottish dancer, in November 1872. They had eight children, two of whom become successful bagpipers, Jack and Hugh. Fraser "did not play the pipes seriously until he was 40". His teacher, Peter Bruce, had left Fraser bagpipes in Bruce's will. With five of their children, the Frasers toured Victoria as a musical group, including a performance at Government House, Melbourne. The ensemble provided clarinet, piccolo, piano, two violins and harp. In addition to bagpipes, Fraser played violin and flute. He continued to work as a stock rider and whip-maker. He was survived by six of his children.
