= Dunalley Bay =

Bay in Tasmania, Australia

Coordinates: 42°55′S 147°48′E

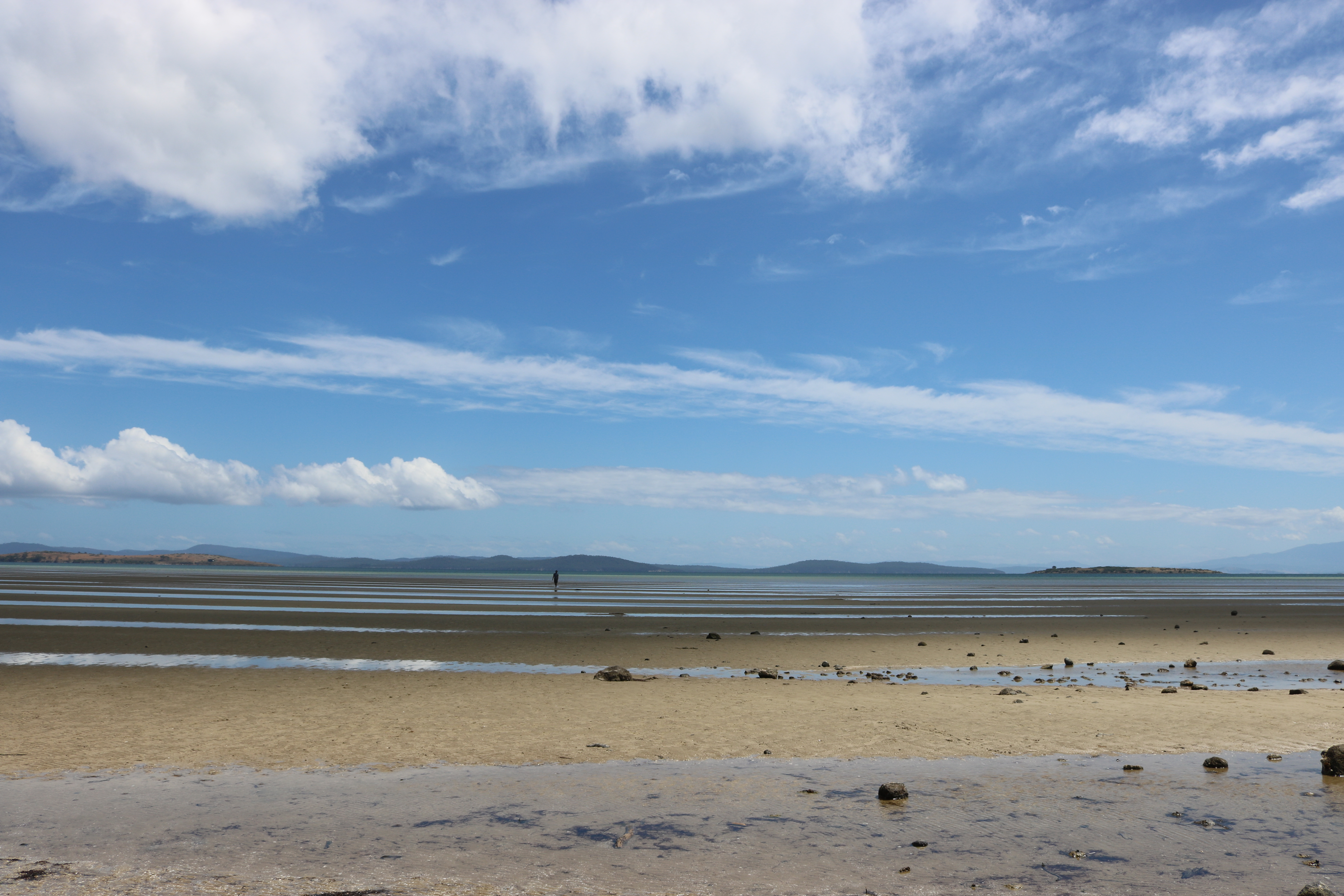
Dunalley Beach

Dunalley Bay refers to a bay on the North East aspect of Norfolk Bay, which lies adjacent to Dunalley, Tasmania, the largest town of Norfolk Bay
