= Taranna =

- Town
- Coordinates: 43°03′S 147°54′E
- Country: Australia
- State: Tasmania
- Region: South-east
- LGA: Tasman Council
- Location: 87 km (54 mi) SW of Hobart; 30 km (19 mi) S of Dunalley; 10 km (6.2 mi) N of Port Arthur; 16 km (9.9 mi) NE of Nubeena

Government
  - State electorate: Lyons
  - Federal division: Lyons
- Elevation: 286 m (938 ft)

Population
  - Total: 156 (2016 census)
- Postcode: 7180
Localities around Taranna
Norfolk Bay	Eaglehawk Neck	Eaglehawk Neck
Norfolk Bay, Koonya	Taranna	Fortescue
Koonya	Port Arthur	Fortescue

Taranna is a small town on the Tasman Peninsula in SE Tasmania. Local points of interest include its Presbyterian church, immediately adjacent to the Federation Chocolate Factory, and a Tasmanian devil park, "Unzoo". It is also a rural locality, named for, and encompassing the town.

== History ==
Taranna was originally known as "Old Norfolk" and "Norfolk Bay Signal Station and Village". Taranna is believed to be an Aboriginal word for “wallaby”.

Norfolk Bay Post Office opened on 1 February 1884 and was renamed "Taranna" in 1887. It closed in 1970.

It was the location of one of the many semaphore stations, towers each within the others line of sight, which connected Port Arthur to Hobart and was often used to quickly notify constables of escaped prisoners.

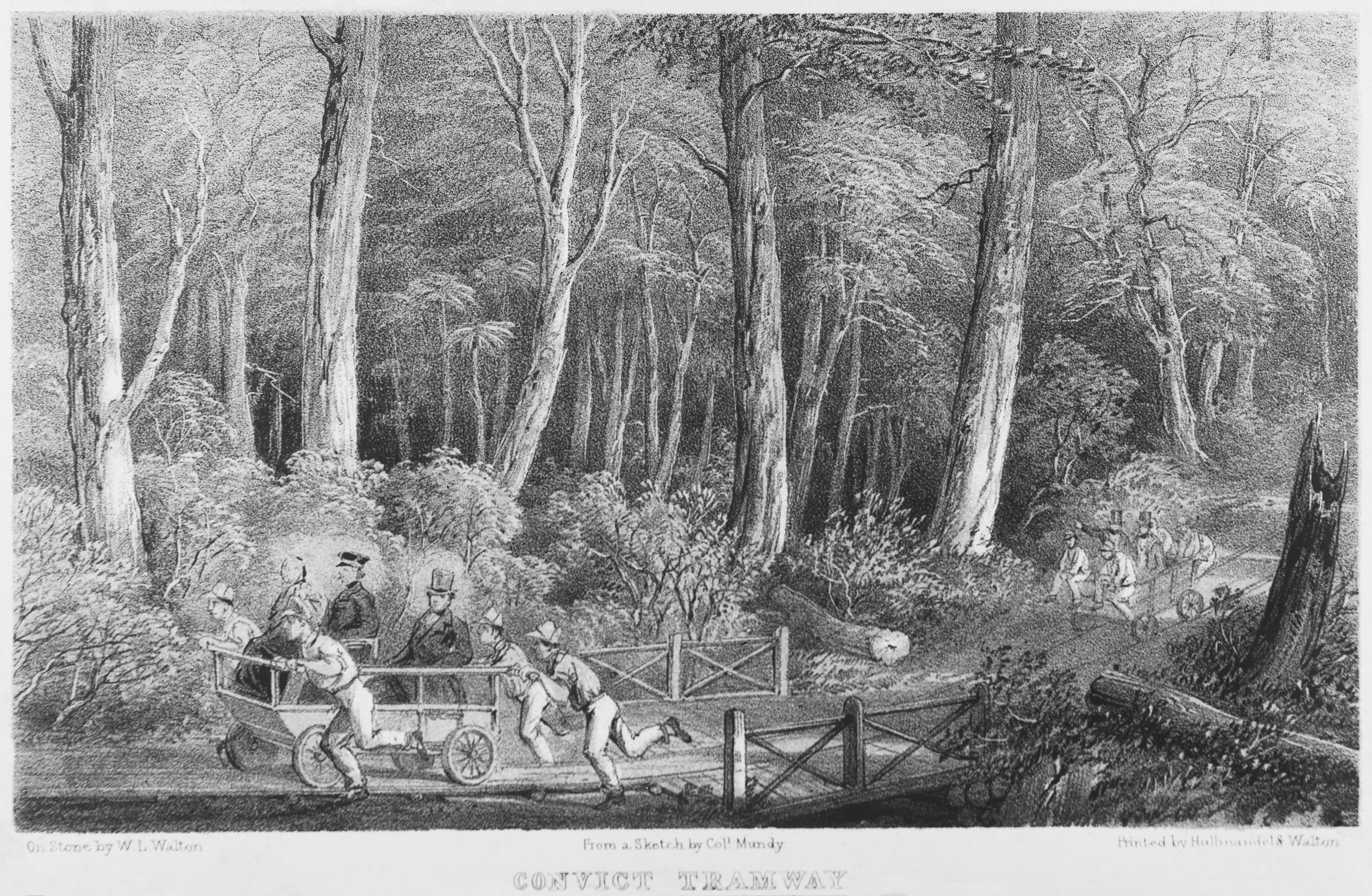
Lithograph of the convict tramway, Tasmania, by William L. Walton from a painting by Lieutenant Colonel Godfrey Mundy

Taranna was first stop on the Convict tramway to Port Arthur. Port Arthur was a remote penal colony and it was often difficult to resupply via boat as the surrounding waters around Storm Bay could be treacherous. Instead, the convict tramway connected it to the sheltered Norfolk Bay. It consisted of 7km of laid rail lines, with carriages pushed by four convicts. It was the first railway in Australia.

== Locality ==
Taranna is also a rural locality as part of the Tasman Council. The locality is about 16 kilometres (9.9 mi) north-east of the town of Nubeena, and gazetted in 1967. The 2016 census recorded a population of 156 for the state suburb of Taranna.

The waters of Norfolk Bay form part of the northern and western boundaries.

== Road infrastructure ==
Route A9 (Arthur Highway) runs through the town from north to south.
