= Norfolk Bay (Tasmania) =

Bay in Tasmania, Australia

- Location in Tasmania
- Location: Southeast Tasmania
- Coordinates: 42°58′12″S 147°46′48″E
- Primary inflows: Frederick Henry Bay
- Primary outflows: Frederick Henry Bay
- Basin countries: Australia
- Frozen: never
- Islands: Smooth Island, King George Island, Fulham Island and Dart Island
- Settlements: Hobart

The Norfolk Bay is a body of water in the south east of Tasmania, Australia. The north west aspect of Norfolk Bay is continuous with Frederick Henry Bay. The north east aspect of Norfolk Bay is continuous with Blackman Bay via the Denison Canal.

== History ==
The first recorded Anglo-Saxon encounter with Norfolk bay was by Matthew Flinders in 1798.

"Norfolk Bay was discovered by Willaumetz, an officer of D'Entrecasteaux, in 1792, who becoming short of provisions, could only get as far as Primrose Point. He did not know then whether this new bay had communication with Tasman's Frederick Hendrick Bay (Blackman's, or Marion Bay); and on D'Entrecasteaux's map Tasman Peninsula is called Tasman Island. Flinders in 1798 (the source erroneously states 1878) visited the Bay, giving it the name of Norfolk, after the small schooner in which he was sailing with Bass. In 1802 Baudin examined the bay, and, unaware of Flinders's nomenclature, gave it the name of Port Buache, after the French King's geographer, who, by the way, was uncle to Beaupre, D'Entrecasteaux's historian. Arrowsmith and Frankland, in 1841 and 1858 used both names, but to-day Norfolk Bay is the only name that survives."

In 1896, after a visit from "H.M. Australian squadron", Norfolk Bay was "stated to be pre-eminently fitted for naval manoeuvres".

A 1909 article in The Mercury records that this bay was "infested with enormous sharks, which were regularly fed by the authorities, to prevent the possibility of convicts escaping from the peninsula to the mainland by swimming".

== Geographical features ==
Lying within Norfolk Bay are Smooth Island, King George Island, Fulham Island and Dart Island. Norfolk bay also contains the following small rock islands: The Mackerel Islets, Tinpot Island and Mason rock.

Frederick Henry Bay, Dunalley Bay and King George Sound, Connellys Bay and Lime Bay are all located adjacent to Norfolk Bay.

The following suburbs surround Norfolk bay: Connellys Marsh, Dunalley, Murdunna, Eaglehawk Neck, Taranna, Koonya, Premaydena and Saltwater River.

=== Nautical information ===
The Cruising Yacht Club of Tasmania published the following information about Norfolk Bay:

Norfolk Bay is relatively shallow (6–7 metres (20–23 ft)) with some deeper holes, and several islands – Smooth Island, King George Island, Fulham Island and Dart Island. Whilst the shallowness can result in fairly choppy conditions in strong winds, especially from the South West, there is no swell to compound the situation. During summer months the sea breeze can bring strong Easterlies but, as with most waters in this part of the world, watch for the south westerly change.

=== Fishing information ===
Sand flathead is the predominant recreational fish species which can be found within Norfolk Bay. A study by the University of Tasmania found that the greatest density of flathead occur southeast of a line connecting Premaydena and Boxalls Bay, particularly towards Koonya.

== See also ==
- Geography of Tasmania
