= David Leaman =

Australian geologist

David Edward Leaman (1943 in Hobart, Australia – 18 January 2018) was an author, structural geologist, geohydrologist and geophysicist.

== Training ==
David Leaman graduated from the University of Tasmania and studied in the Tasmanian Mines Department. His graduate research and early project work for the Department of Mines was related to engineering projects, groundwater assessments and fracture flow in crystalline rocks. He had been specifically trained as a government cadet for specialized engineering and hydrological projects. His title in the Mines Department was Groundwater and Engineering Geologist with the Geological Survey of Tasmania and he worked there from February 1966 till 1973. His doctoral thesis in 1970 derived from problems recognised in Midlands Tasmania and provided the first comprehensive descriptions of dolerite intrusions coupled with a theory of emplacement. The understanding was important for basin and catchment studies and coal resource evaluations. The supervisor of this research was Prof. S. Warren Carey.

== Endeavors ==
Leaman used to lecture and perform research at the University of Tasmania. From 1966 to 1981, he worked for the Geological Survey of Tasmania. His professional studies focus on dolerite, igneous intrusions, granite and the use of gravity and magnetic geophysical methods. After 1981 he maintained a geophysics consulting firm, Leaman Geophysics. In this role he participated in discovering mineral deposits at North Hilton, Queensland, North Rosebery in Tasmania and coal in Queensland. He was involved in oil and gas exploration in Papua New Guinea and Bass Strait. He also assisted local communities and landowners who believed that forestry practices had effected or might effect their land. He was a lecturer at the University of Tasmania from 1972 to 2001 in the areas of civil engineering, tectonics and environmental geology and led field excursion for applied geophysics. In this time he supervised Honours and Doctoral students as well. Funding cuts led to the termination of employment in 2001. He was a member of the Key Centre team for study of Ore Deposits.

Leaman was secured by applicants for appeal to the Tasmanian Resource Management and Planning Appeal Tribunal as their expert scientist to establish proof of the danger of logging and harvesting in the area of South Sister, near St. Marys, Tasmania. His long-term research and experience in holistic catchment assessment and his independence from government and industry groups was valued by many local communities and landowners. He sought to help such groups understand how changes in land use might impact upon their properties and local water resources. He was engaged to act as expert scientific witness in appeals concerning risks to water resources in Tasmania, Victoria and South Australia.

Leaman lead walking tours and led the hiking group during the 2008 Hobart Mountain Festival, celebrating 172 years since Charles Darwin first climbed Mount Wellington. He was a lecturer for the University of the Third Age at Kingborough after 1997.

Leaman was a member of a number of societies and was President of the Royal Society of Tasmania on two occasions.

== Works ==
Leaman authored a number of guide books about Tasmania, including Walk into History in Southern Tasmania, published in 1999 and Step into History in Tasmanian Reserves, published in 2001. He co-authored Mount Wellington Walk Map and Notes with K. D. Corbett, published in 2004.

He also wrote The Rock Which Makes Tasmania, published in 2002, a comprehensive, authoritative work on the Jurassic dolerite that dominates the island of Tasmania; other works include Water-Facts, Issues, Problems and Solutions (3rd edition 2007) and Earthly Secrets (2009).

He published many academic papers, numerous industry reports and maps.
