= Tinpot Island =

Island in Tasmania, Australia

Coordinates: 43°00′S 147°50′E

Tinpot Island is a small island classified as a conservation area within Norfolk Bay, Tasmania.
