= Port Arthur, Tasmania =

UNESCO World Heritage Site in Australia

UNESCO World Heritage Site
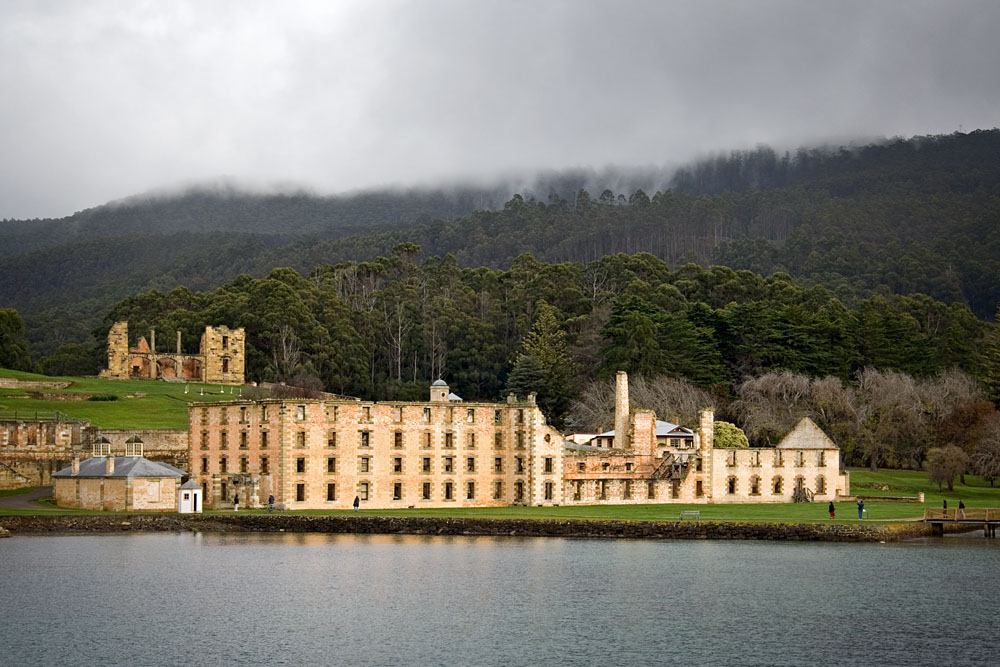
- View of Port Arthur, Tasmania, one of the 11 penal sites constituting the Australian Convict Sites
- Interactive map of Port Arthur, Tasmania
- Part of: Australian Convict Sites
- Criteria: Cultural: iv, vi
- Reference: 1306
- Inscription: 2011 (35th Session)
- Area: 146 ha (360 acres)
- Buffer zone: 1,216.51 ha (3,006.1 acres)
- Website: portarthur.org.au

Port Arthur
- Town
- Coordinates: 43°09′0″S 147°51′0″E
- Country: Australia
- State: Tasmania
- LGA: Tasman Council
- Location: 97 km (60 mi) SE of Hobart; 19 km (12 mi) S of Eaglehawk Neck
- Established: 1830

Government
  - State electorate: Lyons
  - Federal division: Lyons

Population
  - Total: 251 (2016 census)
- Postcode: 7182
- Mean max temp: 14.8 °C (58.6 °F)
- Mean min temp: 8.2 °C (46.8 °F)
- Annual rainfall: 1,148.8 mm (45.23 in)

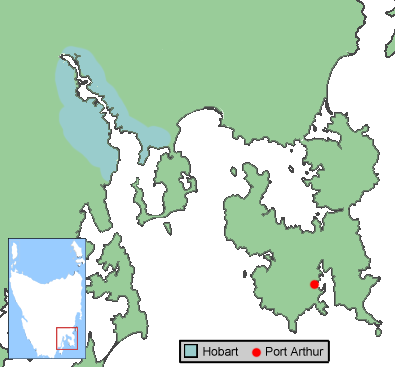
Location of Port Arthur.

Port Arthur is a town and former convict settlement on the Tasman Peninsula, in Tasmania, Australia. It is located approximately 97 kilometres (60 mi) southeast of the state capital, Hobart.

The site forms part of the Australian Convict Sites, a World Heritage property consisting of 11 remnant penal sites originally built within the British Empire during the 18th and 19th centuries on fertile Australian coastal strips. Collectively, these sites, including Port Arthur, are described by UNESCO as "... the best surviving examples of large-scale convict transportation and the colonial expansion of European powers through the presence and labour of convicts."

In 1996, the town was the scene of the Port Arthur massacre, the deadliest instance of mass murder in post-colonial Australian history.

== History ==
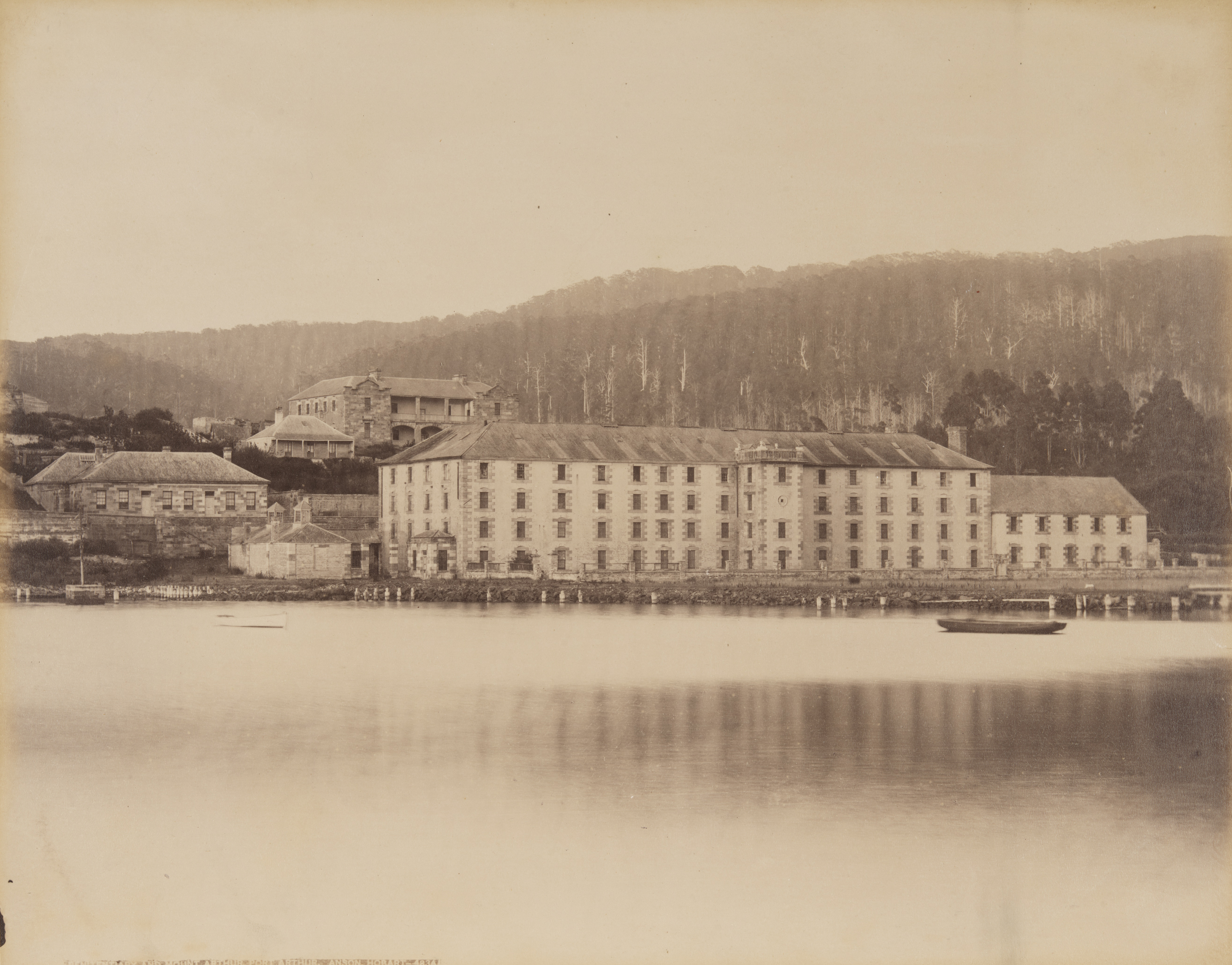
Penitentiary and Mount Arthur, Tasmania, c. 1880, by Anson Brothers

Port Arthur was named after George Arthur, the lieutenant governor of Van Diemen's Land. The settlement started as a timber station in 1830, but it is best known for being a penal colony.

=== Penal colony ===
The Port Arthur convict settlement was established in September 1830 as a timber-getting camp, producing sawn logs for government projects. From 1833 until 1877, it was the destination for those deemed the most hardened of transported convicts ― so-called "secondary offenders" ― who had persistently re-offended during their time in Australia. The recalcitrant offenders were sent to Port Arthur, which had some of the strictest security measures in the British penal system but was, nevertheless, also based on the idea that prisoners could be reformed while still being punished.

==== Separate Prison ====
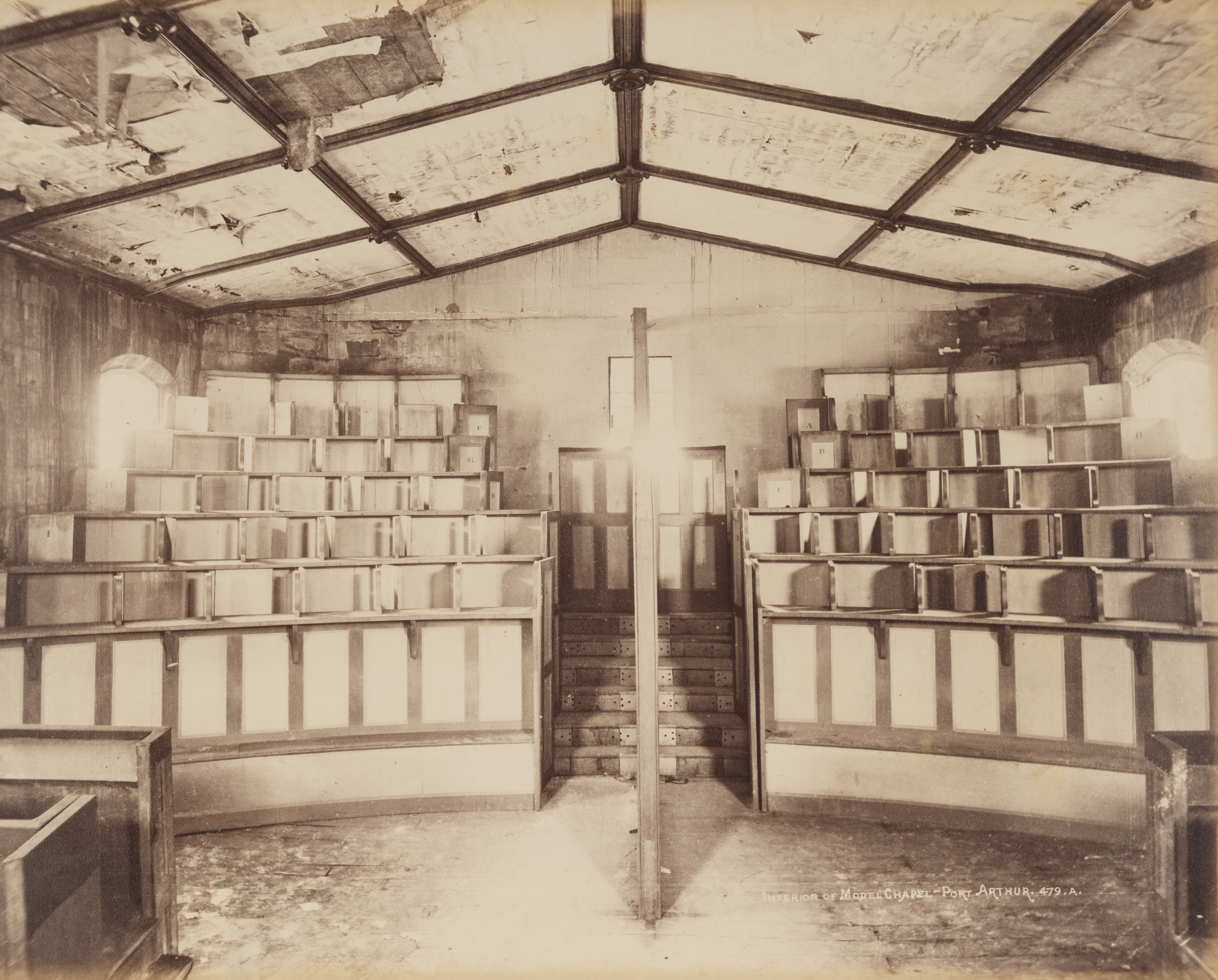
Interior of Model Chapel, Port Arthur, Tasmania, c. 1880, by Anson Brothers

Port Arthur included a "Separate Prison", which emerged from Jeremy Bentham's theories and his panopticon. The Separate Prison was completed in 1853, and extended in 1855. The layout was fairly symmetrical. It was in a cross shape with exercise yards at each corner. The prisoner wings were each connected to the surveillance core of the prison, as well as the chapel in the centre hall. From the surveillance hub, each wing could be clearly seen, although individual cells could not. In that way, the Separate Prison at Port Arthur differed from the original theory of the panopticon.

The Separate Prison's system also signalled a shift from physical punishment to psychological punishment. The hard corporal punishment, such as whippings, used in other penal stations, was thought to only serve to harden criminals, and did nothing to turn them from their immoral ways. For example, food was used to reward well-behaved prisoners and as punishment for troublemakers. As a reward, a prisoner could receive larger amounts of food or even luxury items such as tea, sugar, and tobacco. As punishment, the prisoners would receive the bare minimum of bread and water. Under this system of punishment, the "Silent System" was implemented in the building. Here, prisoners were hooded and made to stay silent; this was supposed to allow time for the prisoner to reflect upon the actions which had brought him there. Many of the prisoners in the Separate Prison developed mental illness from the lack of light and sound. This was an unintended outcome, although the asylum was built next to the Separate Prison. In many ways, Port Arthur was the model for the penal reform movement, despite the shipping, housing, and use of convicts as slave-labour being as harsh, or worse, than other institutions around the nation.

==== Activities of prisoners ====
Port Arthur was also the destination for juvenile convicts, receiving many boys, some as young as nine. The boys were separated from the main convict population and kept on Point Puer, the British Empire's second boys' prison. Like the adults, the boys were used in hard labour such as stone cutting and construction. One of the buildings constructed was one of Australia's first non-denominational churches, built in a Gothic Revival style. Attendance at the weekly Sunday service was compulsory for the prison population. Critics of the new system noted that it seemed to have negligible impact on a prisoner's reformation.

The archaeology of Port Arthur reveals the relatively mundane activities of everyday life. Not only did the people living there help prepare food, but they also participated in recreational activities such as smoking and hunting. Archaeological excavation of the Port Arthur workshops complex is overseen by the Port Arthur Historic Site Management Authority (PAHSMA). These workshops, situated on the original waterfront since 1830, housed the trades-focussed activities undertaken at the penal station including shoemakers, blacksmiths, tailors, turners and wheelwrights. A journal of the ongoing excavation and conservation work at Port Arthur is documented online by Dr Richard Tuffin.

A number of ongoing archaeological and historical research projects at Port Arthur include interactive web mapping of convict offences by the University of New England as part of their Convict Landscapes project, and the Founders and Survivors project to digitise Tasmania's past. The Landscapes of Production and Punishment: the Tasman Peninsula 1830-77 project funded by the Australian Research Council, in partnership with the Port Arthur Historic Site Management Authority, continues to examine the convict system from the perspective of convicts as workers. GIS mapping of location and offence data compiled by Dr Richard Tuffin uses the buildings, work sites, products and life outcomes to understand the convicts’ lives and labours whilst under sentence.

== Geography ==
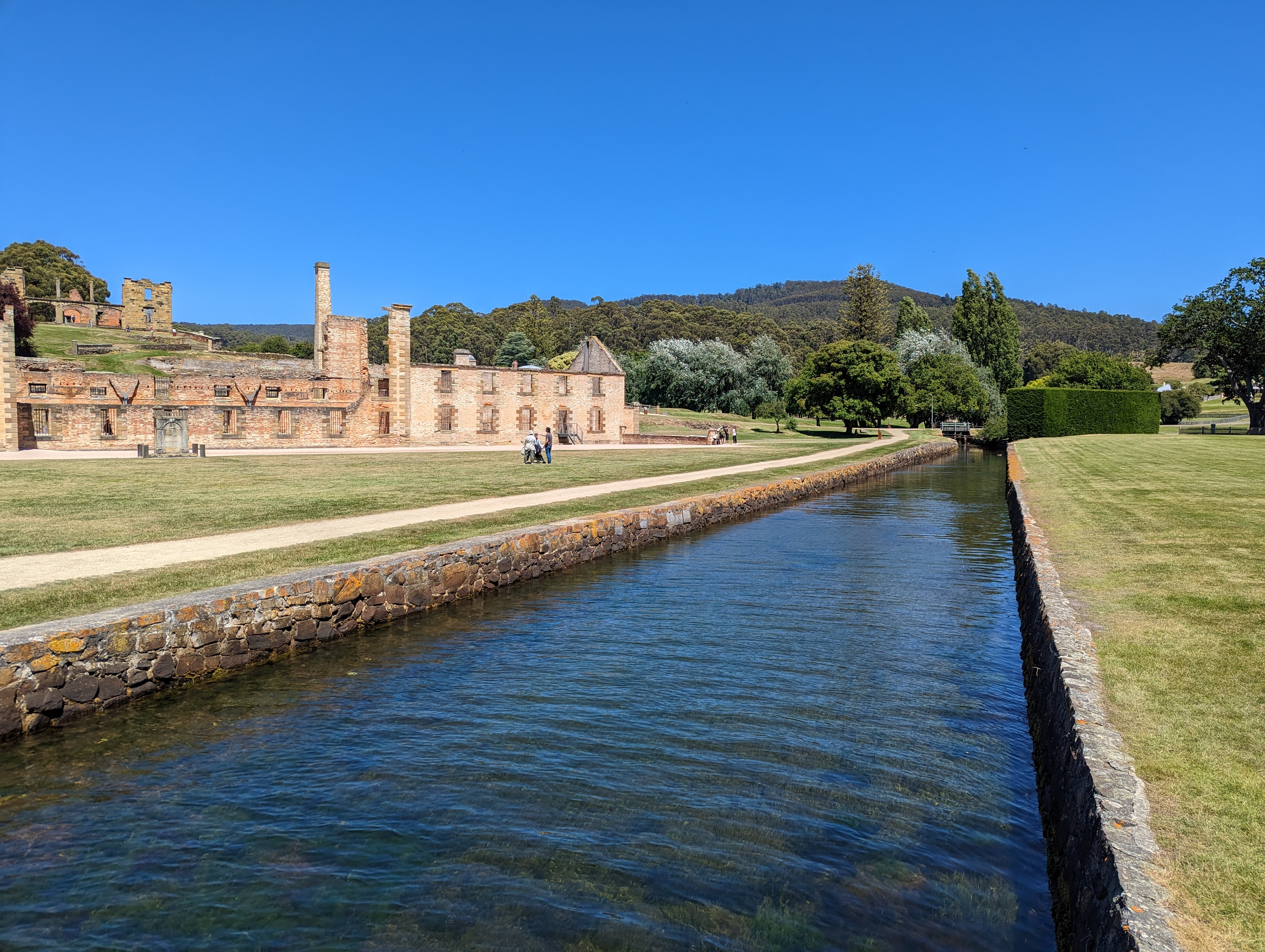
The tidal portion of Radcliffe Creek

The peninsula on which Port Arthur is located is a naturally secure site by being surrounded by water (rumoured by the administration to be shark-infested). The 30-metre-wide isthmus of Eaglehawk Neck that was the only connection to the mainland was fenced and guarded by soldiers, traps, and dogs.

Shore-based and ship-based whaling was banned in the area to prevent convicts trying to escape in the boats. Officers at Port Arthur sometimes set out in their own boats and attempted to catch whales. This may have been more for sport than as a commercial activity.

Smooth Island in Norfolk Bay was most likely used to grow fresh vegetables for the Port Arthur penal settlement.

Radcliffe Creek drains the immediate area of Port Arthur into Carnarvon Bay.

=== Transport ===
Contact between visiting seamen and prisoners was barred. Ships had to check in their sails and oars upon landing to prevent any escapes. However, many attempts were made, and some were successful. Boats were seized and rowed or sailed long distances to freedom.

Port Arthur was the birthplace of rail transport in Australia. In 1836, a tramway was established between Taranna and a jetty in Long Bay, north of Port Arthur. The sole propulsion was convicts. One of the last remaining sections of the tramway can be viewed at the Federation Chocolate Factory at Taranna.

=== Reputation and perception ===
Port Arthur was sold as an inescapable prison, much like the later Alcatraz Island in the United States. Some prisoners were not discouraged by this, and tried to escape. Martin Cash successfully escaped along with two others.

Despite its reputation as a pioneering institution for the new, enlightened view of imprisonment, Port Arthur was still in reality as harsh and brutal as other penal settlements. Some critics might even suggest that its use of psychological punishment, compounded with no hope of escape, made it one of the worst. Some tales suggest that prisoners committed murder (an offence punishable by death) just to escape the desolation of life at the camp. The Isle of the Dead was the destination for all who died inside the prison camps. Of the 1,646 graves recorded to exist there, only 180, those of prison staff and military personnel, are marked. The prison closed in 1877.

== Tourism development ==
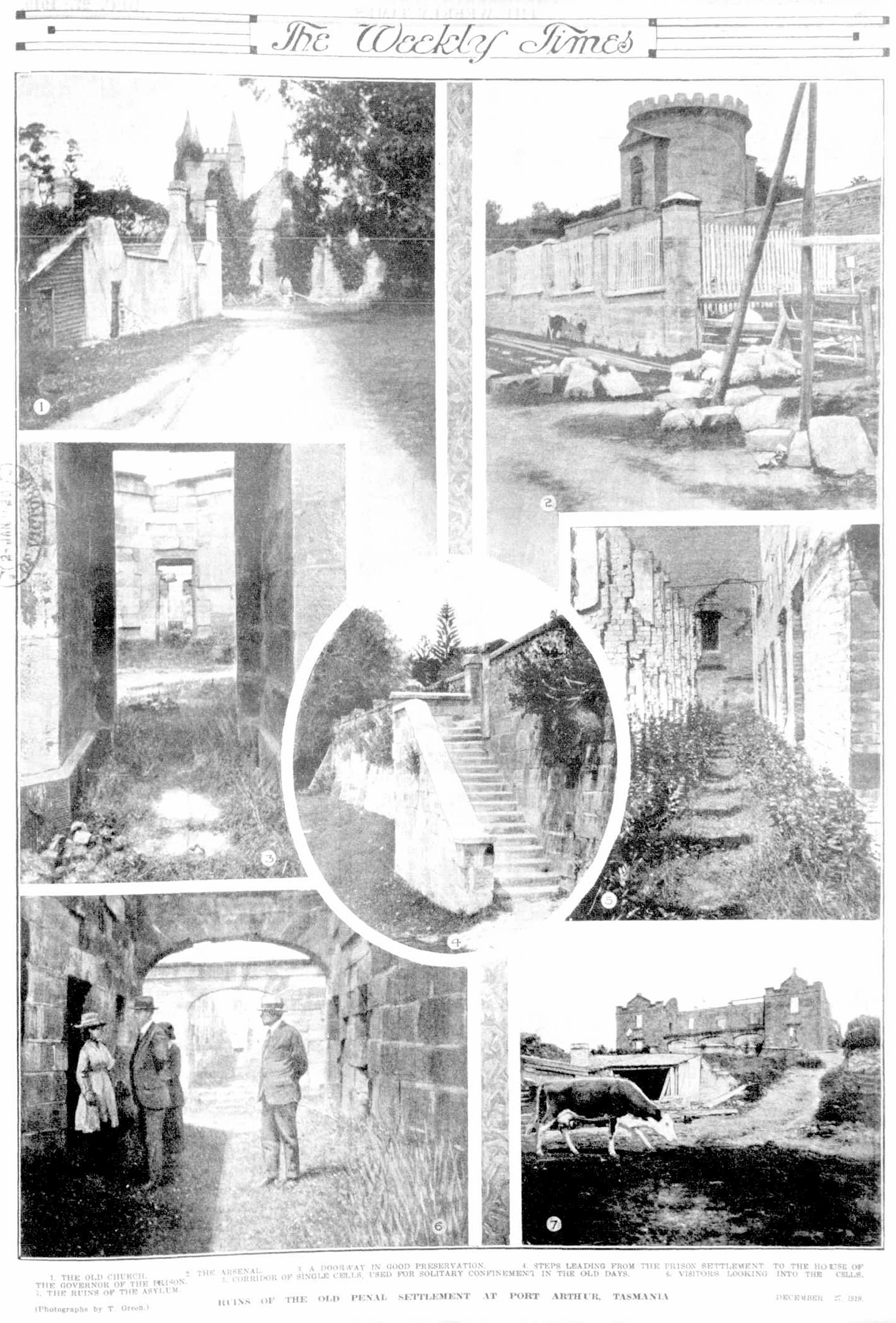
"Ruins Of The Old Penal Settlement At Port Arthur, Tasmania", article from Weekly Times, 1919

Before Port Arthur was abandoned as a prison in 1877, some people saw the potential tourist attraction. David Burn, who visited the prison in 1842, was awed by the peninsula's beauty and believed that many would come to visit it. This opinion was not shared by all. For example, Anthony Trollope in 1872 declared that no man desired to see the "strange ruins" of Port Arthur.

After the prison closed, much of the property was put up for auction. However, most of the property was not sold until 1889. By this time, the area had become increasingly popular and the prison buildings were in decay. As the Hobart Mercury proclaimed, "the buildings themselves are fast going to decay, and in a few years will attract nobody; for they will be ruins without anything to make them worthy of respect, or even remembrance." The Model Prison was purchased by Anglican church minister and politician Joseph Woollnough, who operated tours and donated the proceeds to the church.

The decay was seen as something positive, as the Tasmanian population wished to distance themselves from the dark image of Port Arthur. Those who bought Port Arthur property began tearing down the buildings, the destruction was furthered by the fires of 1895 and 1897, which destroyed the old prison house, and earth tremors. In place of the Prison Port Arthur, the town of Carnarvon was born. The town was named after the British Secretary of State and the population was said to be "refined and intellectual". The town brought in many visitors as they encouraged boating, fishing, and shooting in the natural beauty of the peninsula. They again wished to remove the negative connotation attached to the area.

Despite this wish, the haunting stories of Port Arthur prisoners and circulating ghost stories brought popularity to the remaining prison ruins. This was helped by the popular novels For the Term of His Natural Life (1874) by Marcus Clarke and The Broad Arrow (1859) by Caroline Leakey, which concerned themselves about convicts in Port Arthur.

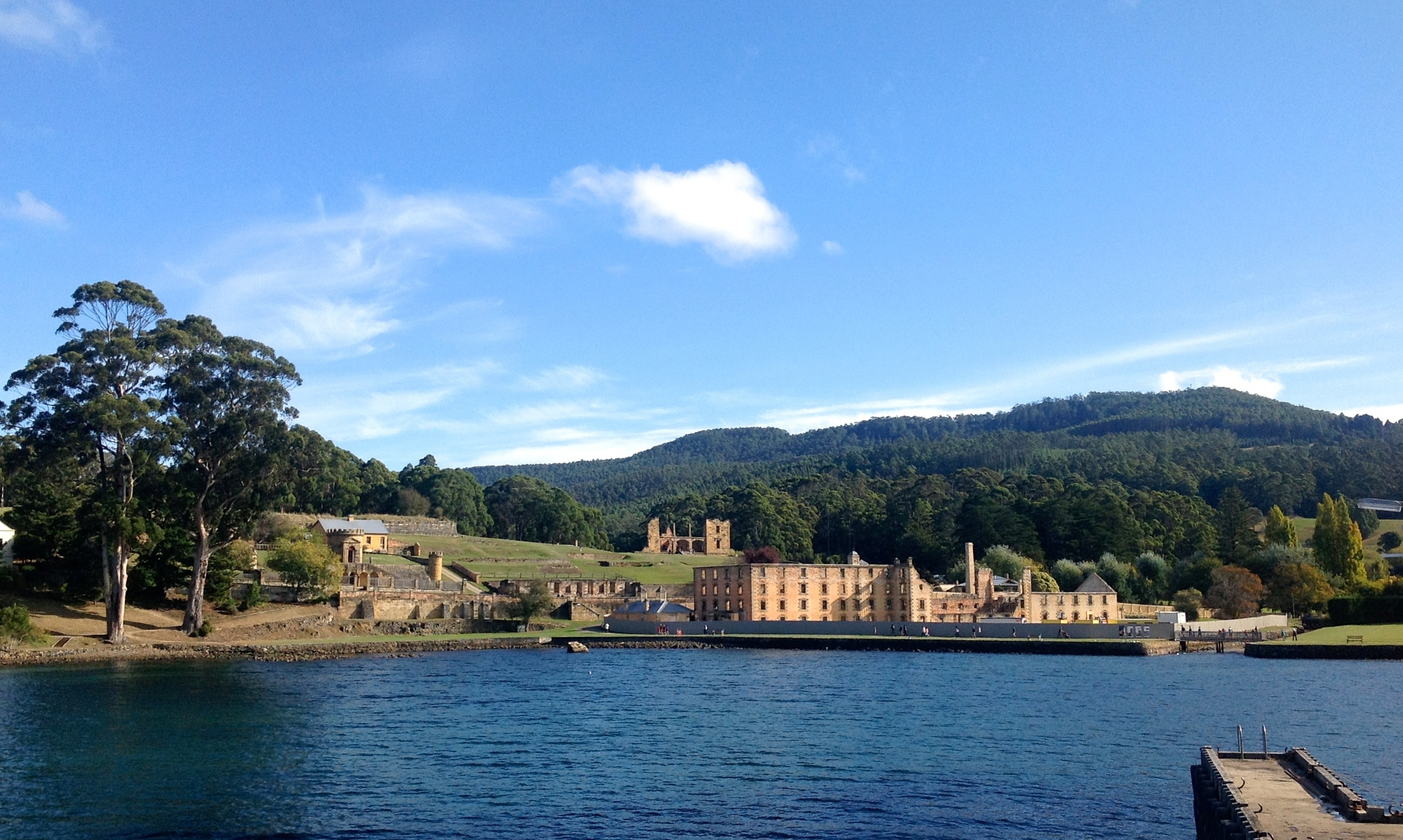
Port Arthur, Tasmania as a tourist place

In 1927, tourism had grown to the point where the area's name was reverted to Port Arthur. In 1916, the Scenery Preservation Board (SPB) was established to take the management of Port Arthur out of the hands of the locals. By the 1970s, the National Parks and Wildlife Service began managing the site.

In 1979, funding was received to preserve the site as a tourist destination, due to its historical significance. The "working" elements of the Port Arthur community, such as the post office and municipal offices, were moved to nearby Nubeena. Several sandstone structures, built by convicts working under hard labour conditions, were cleaned of ivy overgrowth and restored to a condition similar to their appearance in the 19th century. Buildings include the "Model Prison", the Guard Tower, the Church, and the remnants of the main penitentiary. The buildings are surrounded by lush, green parkland. The graves on the Isle of the Dead also attract visitors.

Point Puer, across the harbour from the main settlement, was the site of the first boys' reformatory in the British Empire. Boys sent there were given some basic education, and taught trade skills.

=== Conservation management ===
Since 1987, the site has been managed by the Port Arthur Historic Site Management Authority, with conservation works funded by the Tasmanian government and the admission fees paid by visitors. Volunteer groups have been working at the building sites of Point Puer to help researchers gain a better understanding of the history of the boys' prison.

The World Heritage Committee of UNESCO inscribed the Port Arthur Historic Site and the Coal Mines Historic Site onto the World Heritage Register on 31 July 2010, as part of the Australian Convict Sites World Heritage property. Port Arthur is one of Australia's most visited historical sites, receiving over 250,000 visitors each year.

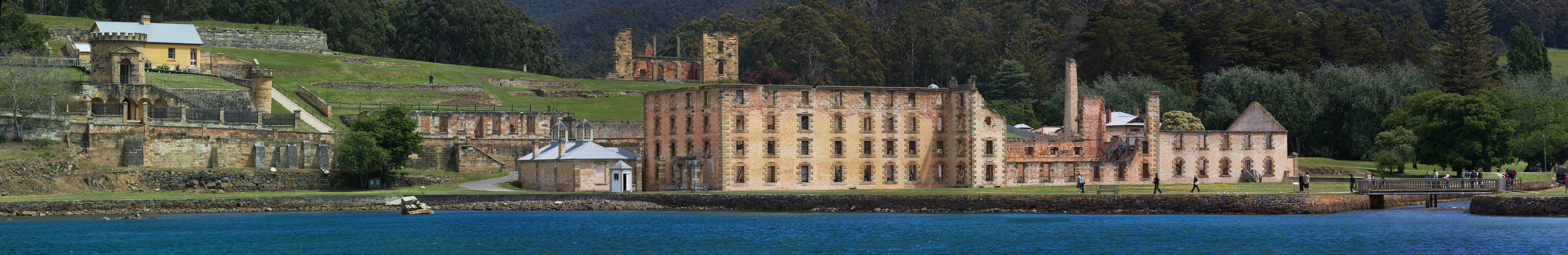
Port Arthur site

== Massacre ==
On 28 April 1996, the Port Arthur historic site was the location of a massacre. Martin Bryant murdered 35 people and wounded 23 more before being captured by the Special Operations Group. The killing spree led to a national restriction on high capacity semiautomatic shotguns and rifles. The 28-year-old perpetrator was subsequently convicted and is currently serving 35 life sentences plus 135 years without parole in the psychiatric wing of Risdon Prison in Hobart, Tasmania.

== Notable people ==
- Simon Alexander Fraser (1845–1934), Australian bagpiper, stock rider, and whip-maker

== Gallery ==
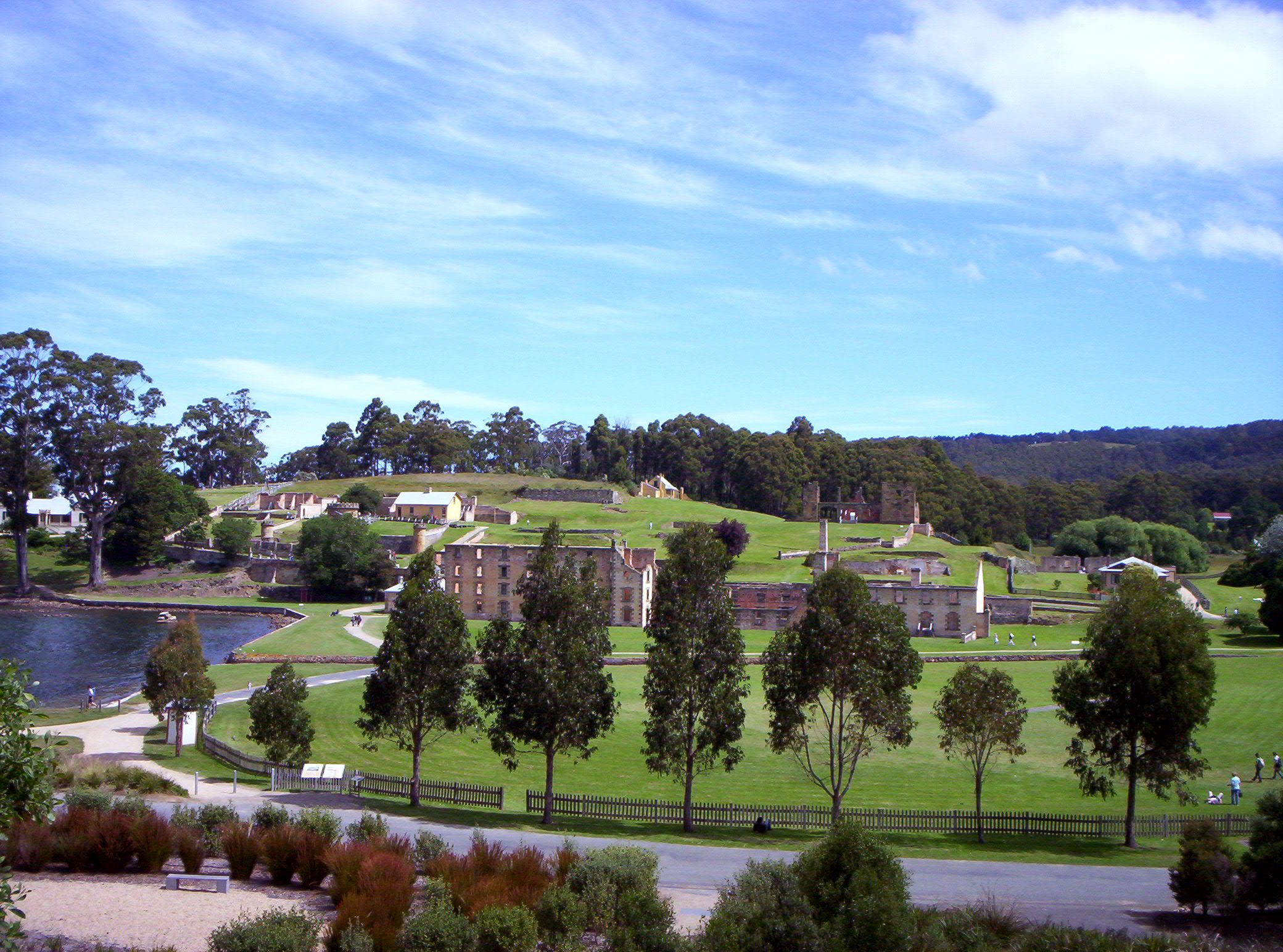
Port Arthur Prison Colony site

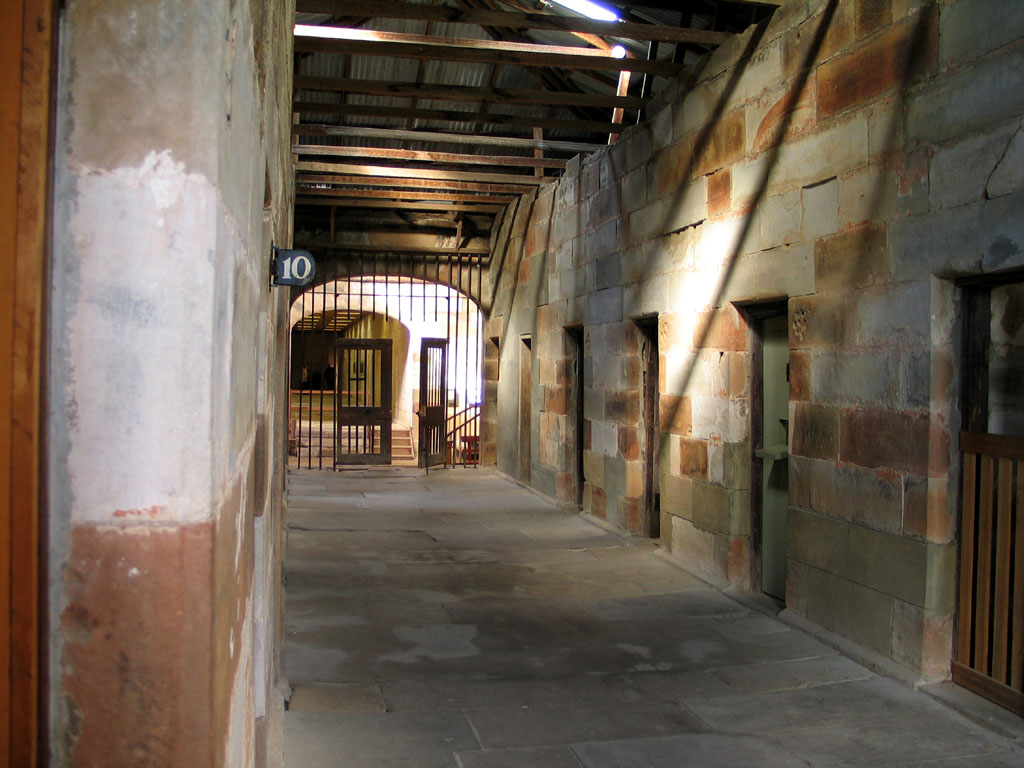
Inside the separate prison, Port Arthur, Tasmania

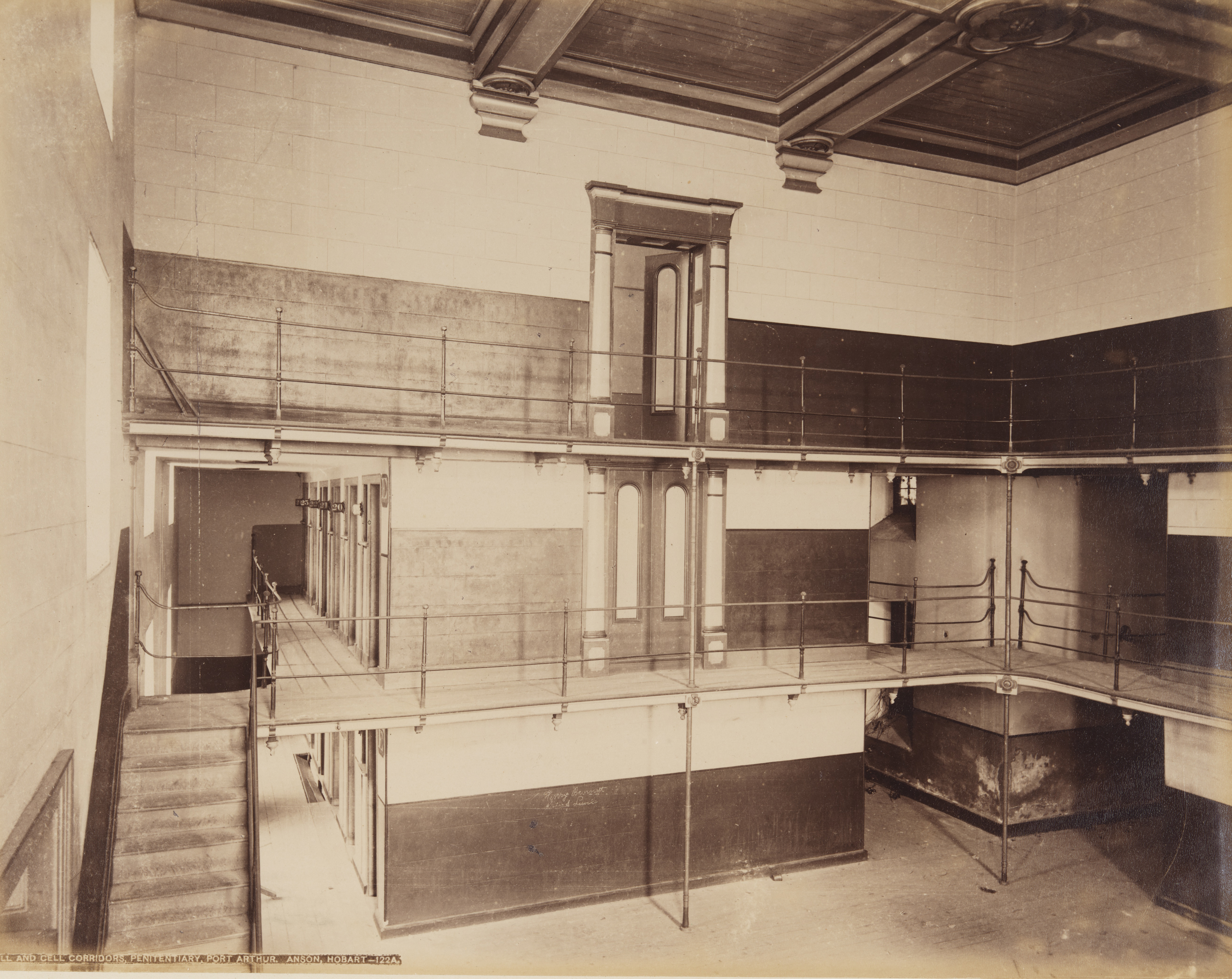
Hall and Cell Corridors, Penitentiary, Port Arthur, ca. 1880, Anson Brothers

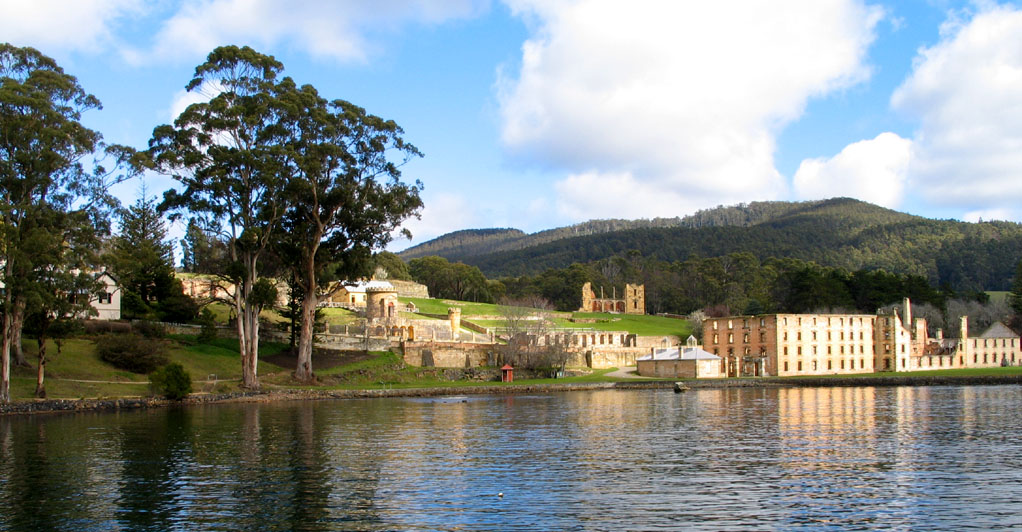
Port Arthur, Tasmania

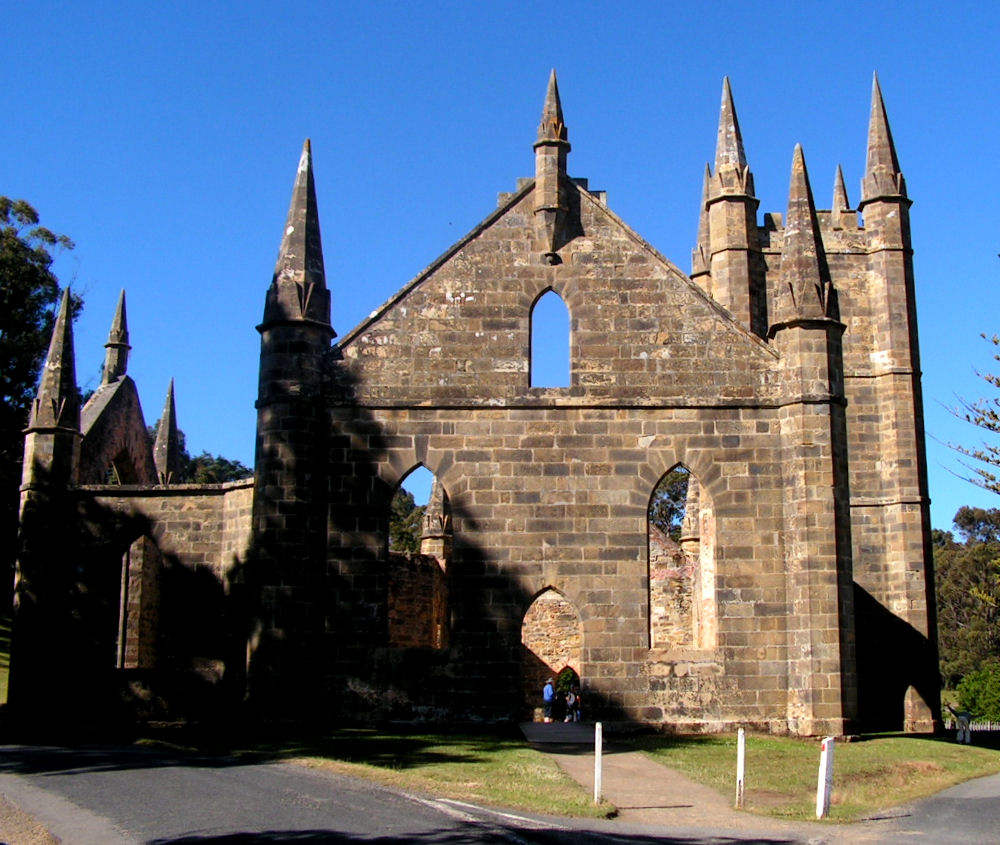
Convict-built church at Port Arthur

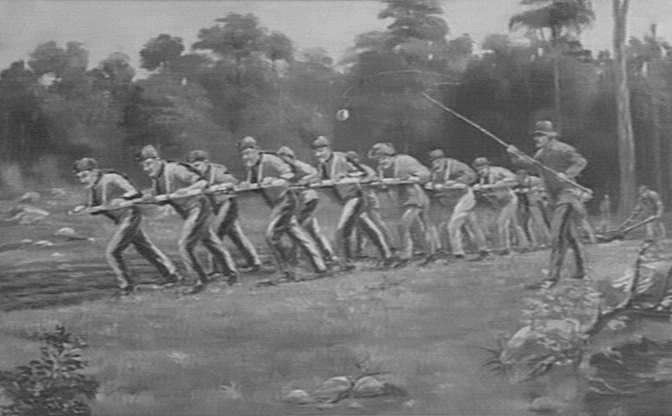
A postcard depicting a convict team ploughing a farm at Port Arthur, dated 1926

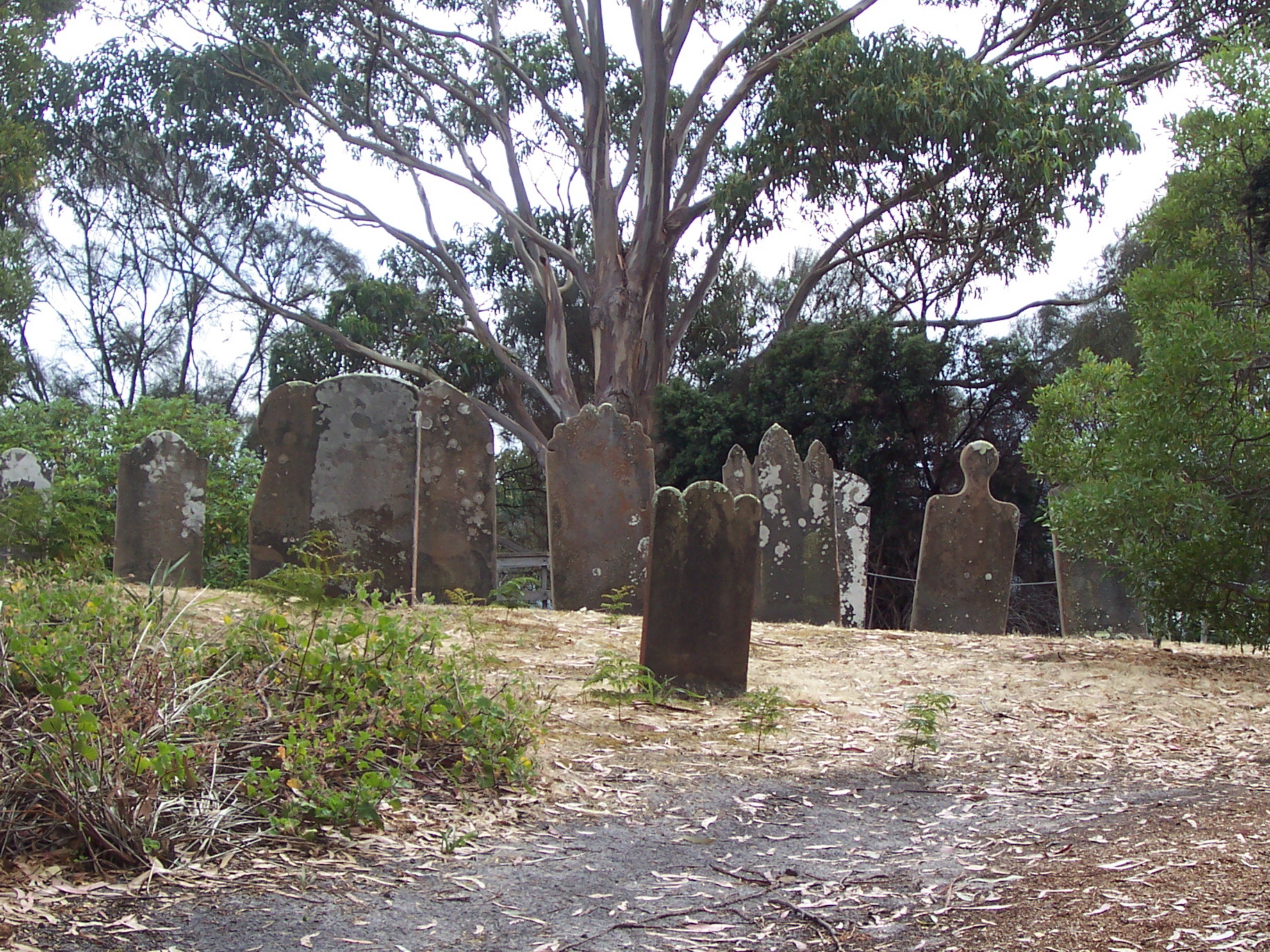
Gravestones on the Isle of the Dead

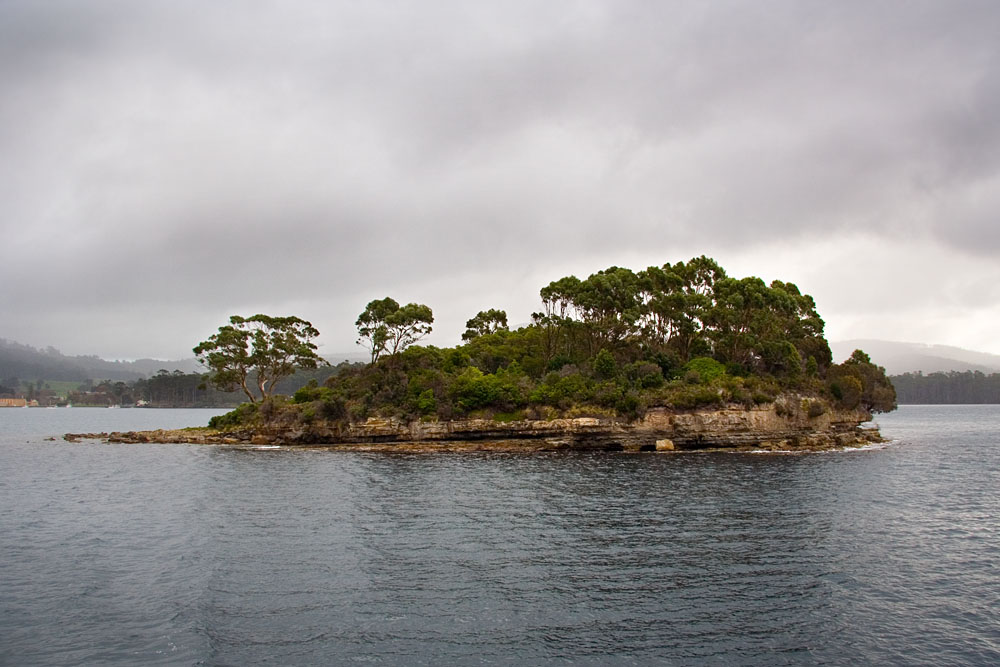
Isle of the Dead

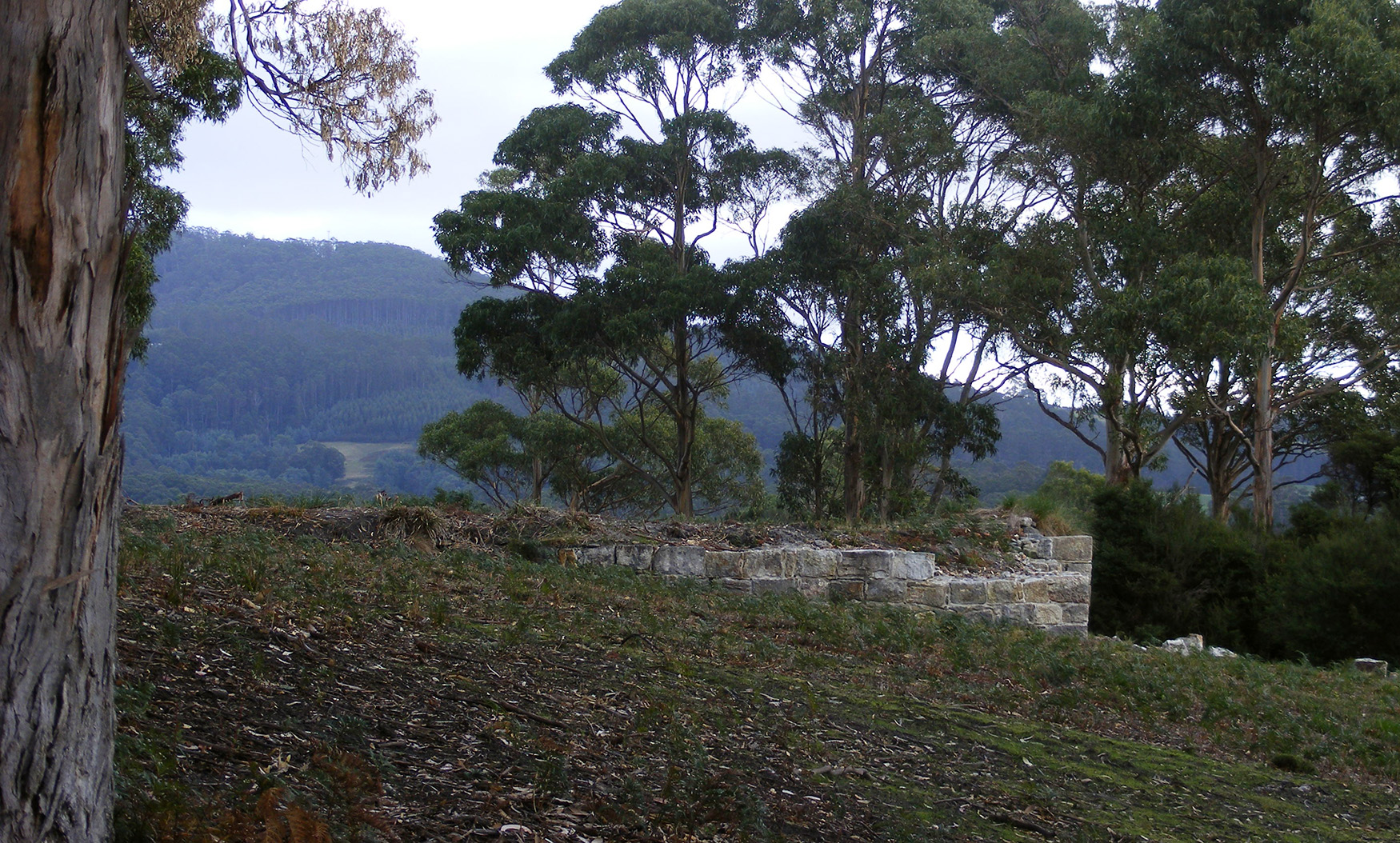
The ruins of the church at Point Puer: It would have overlooked the church at Port Arthur.

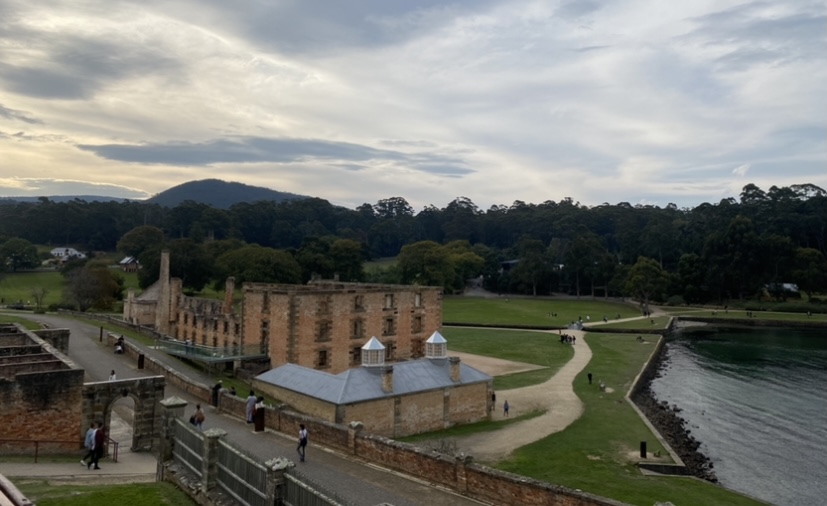
View of Port Arthur Historic Site from Guard Tower showing the Penitentiary

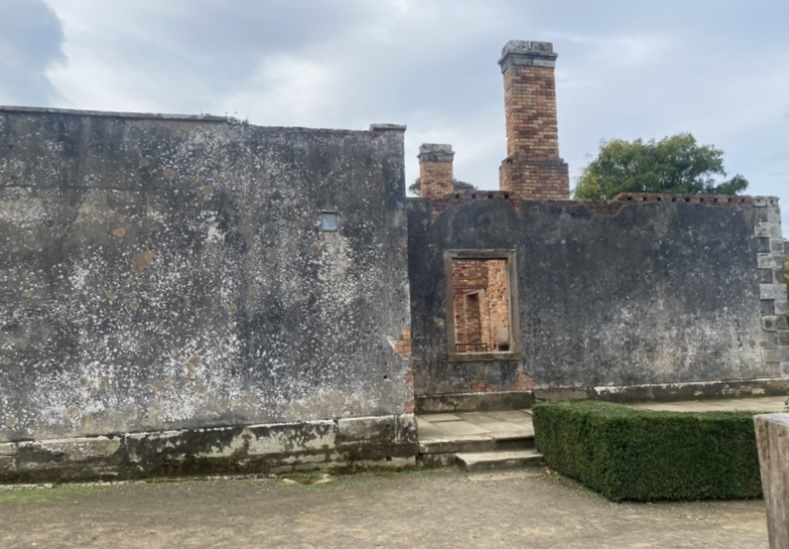
Ruins of the Government Cottage at Port Arthur Historic Site

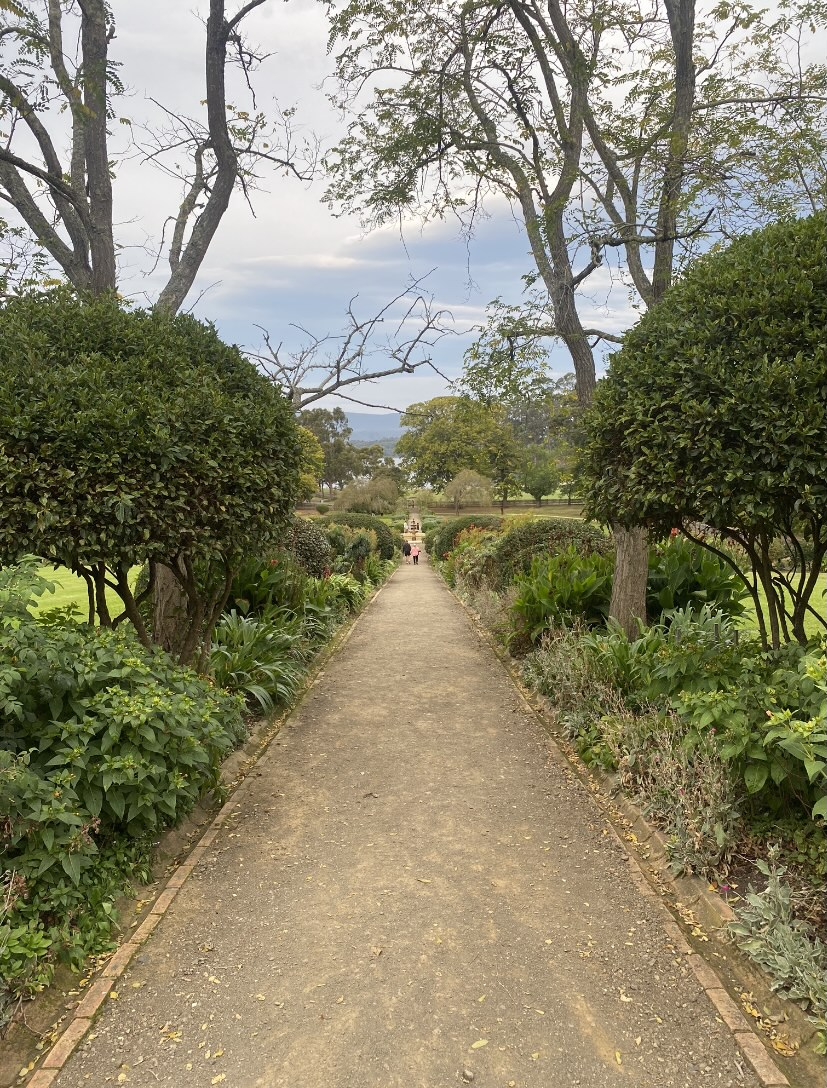
Government Gardens at Port Arthur Historic Site

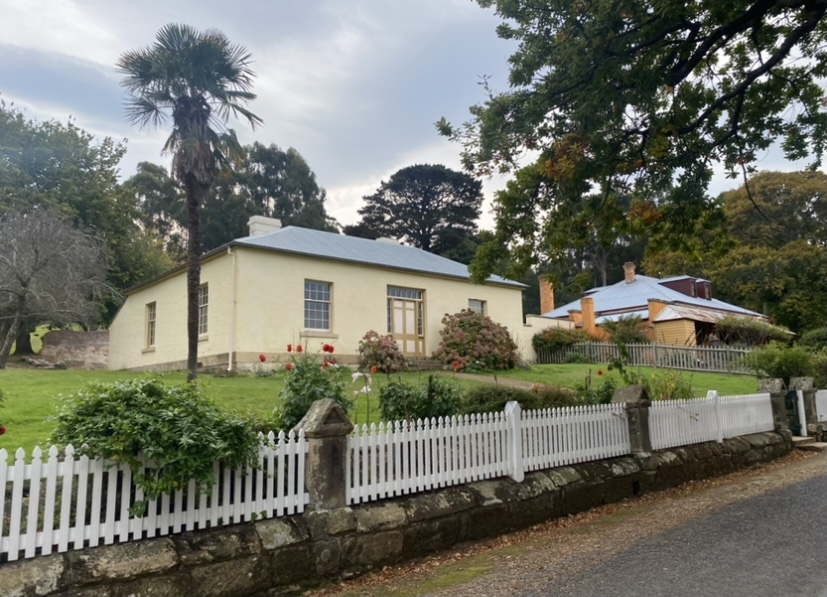
Accountant's House and Parsonage at Port Arthur Historic Site, Tasmania

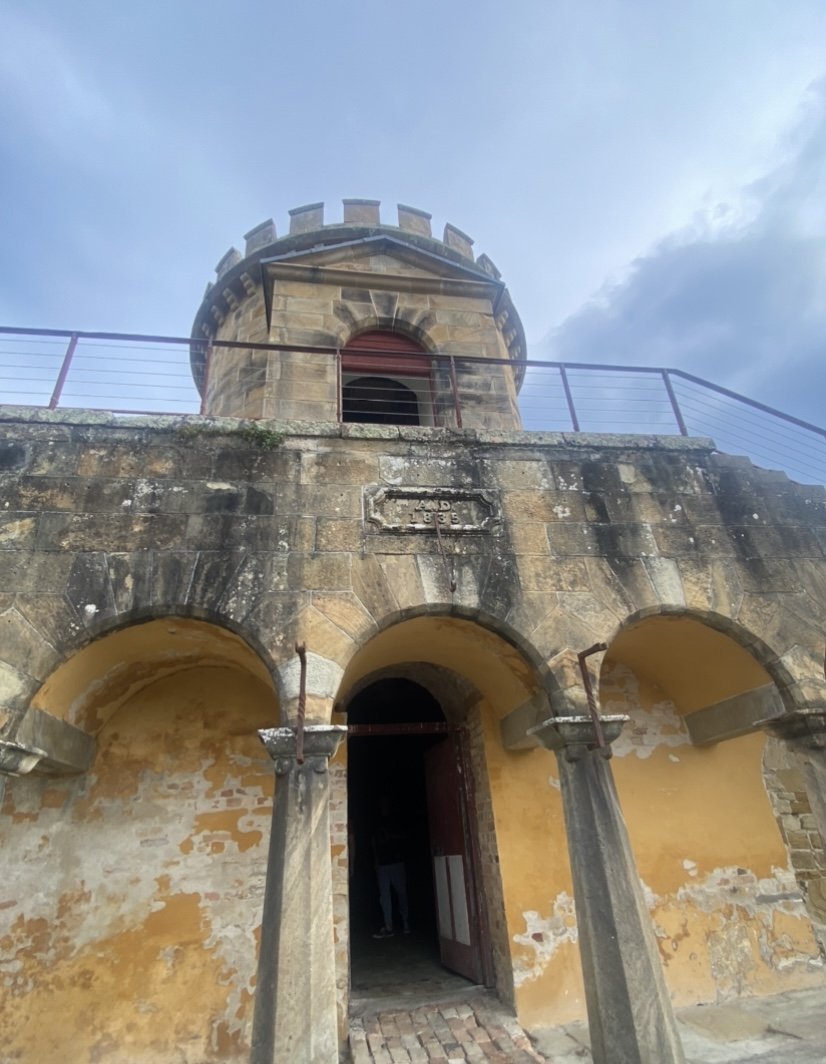
Guard Tower at Port Arthur Historic Site

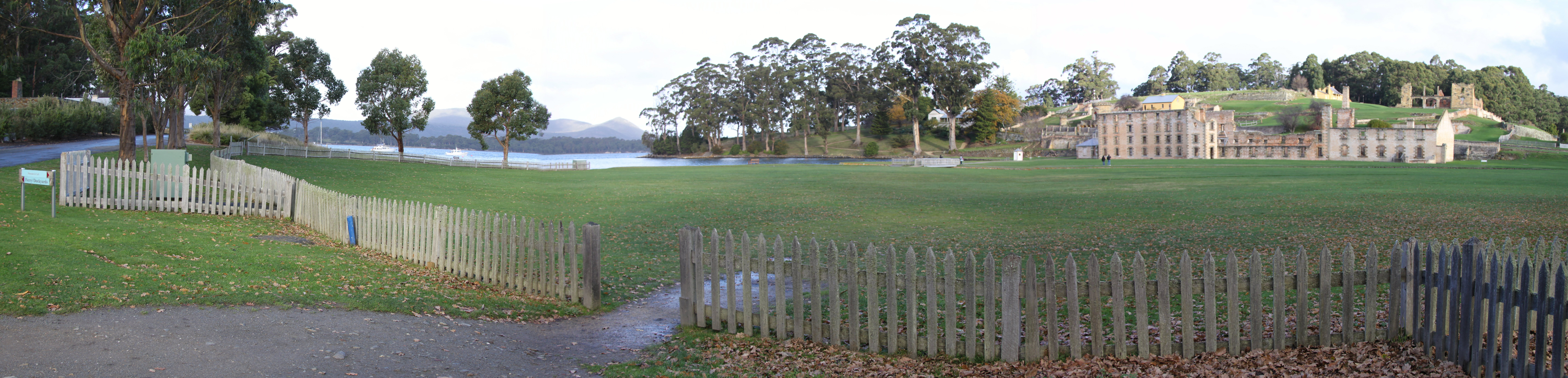
Port Arthur historic site, Tasmania, Australia (panorama), May 2011

== See also ==
- Convicts on the West Coast of Tasmania
- Convictism in Australia
