= Nubeena =

- Town
- Coordinates: 43°06′S 147°45′E
- Country: Australia
- State: Tasmania
- LGA: Tasman Council
- Location: 103 km (64 mi) SE of Hobart

Government
  - State electorate: Lyons
  - Federal division: Lyons

Population
  - Total: 362 (2021 census)
- Postcode: 7184
- Mean max temp: 14.8 °C (58.6 °F)
- Mean min temp: 8.2 °C (46.8 °F)
- Annual rainfall: 1,148.6 mm (45.22 in)

Nubeena is a town and fishing village on the Tasman Peninsula, Tasmania, Australia a township of Tasman Council, and seat of the municipality. At the 2021 census, Nubeena had a population of 362. It is the largest settlement on the peninsula.

== Media ==
Nubeena is served by 97.7 Tasman FM and Pulse FM Tasman which is run by the JNET Radio Network.

== Geography ==
The town is halfway along the west coast of Tasman Peninsula, on Parsons Bay, which is a narrow continuation of Wedge Bay. It is 10.3 km (6.4 mi) north-west of Port Arthur.

=== Climate ===
Nubeena has an oceanic climate (Köppen: Cfb), with very mild summers and cool winters. Due to its position on the Tasman Peninsula, there is little rainfall and seasonal variation. Average maxima vary from 18.9 °C (66.0 °F) in February to 11.0 °C (51.8 °F) in July while average minima fluctuate between 11.2 °C (52.2 °F) in February and 5.7 °C (42.3 °F) in July and August. Mean average annual precipitation is moderately abundant: 1,148.6 mm (45.22 in), and is very frequent, spread across 201.2 precipitation days. The town has 206.1 cloudy days and only 32.7 clear days per annum. Extreme temperatures have ranged from 37.0 °C (98.6 °F) on 3 January 1991 to −0.5 °C (31.1 °F) on 25 July 1986 and on 19 September 1994. All climate data was sourced from Port Arthur.

Climate data for Nubeena (43º09'48"S, 147º49'48"E, 192 m AMSL) (1980-2009 normals & extremes)
Month	Jan	Feb	Mar	Apr	May	Jun	Jul	Aug	Sep	Oct	Nov	Dec	Year
Record high °C (°F)	37.0 (98.6)	36.1 (97.0)	33.2 (91.8)	26.0 (78.8)	22.0 (71.6)	17.8 (64.0)	17.0 (62.6)	19.7 (67.5)	27.0 (80.6)	28.5 (83.3)	30.6 (87.1)	34.4 (93.9)	37.0 (98.6)
Mean daily maximum °C (°F)	18.6 (65.5)	18.9 (66.0)	17.5 (63.5)	15.6 (60.1)	13.4 (56.1)	11.4 (52.5)	11.0 (51.8)	11.7 (53.1)	13.1 (55.6)	14.3 (57.7)	15.7 (60.3)	16.9 (62.4)	14.8 (58.7)
Mean daily minimum °C (°F)	10.9 (51.6)	11.2 (52.2)	10.5 (50.9)	9.2 (48.6)	7.8 (46.0)	6.1 (43.0)	5.7 (42.3)	5.7 (42.3)	6.3 (43.3)	7.2 (45.0)	8.4 (47.1)	9.6 (49.3)	8.2 (46.8)
Record low °C (°F)	3.0 (37.4)	5.0 (41.0)	2.7 (36.9)	2.2 (36.0)	0.6 (33.1)	−0.4 (31.3)	−0.5 (31.1)	0.6 (33.1)	−0.5 (31.1)	0.5 (32.9)	1.8 (35.2)	3.0 (37.4)	−0.5 (31.1)
Average precipitation mm (inches)	91.8 (3.61)	61.8 (2.43)	91.2 (3.59)	95.8 (3.77)	81.9 (3.22)	109.9 (4.33)	110.0 (4.33)	123.1 (4.85)	105.9 (4.17)	102.9 (4.05)	80.0 (3.15)	96.8 (3.81)	1,148.6 (45.22)
Average precipitation days (≥ 0.2 mm)	14.1	12.4	15.7	16.3	17.6	18.2	18.3	18.8	18.1	18.4	16.7	16.6	201.2
Average afternoon relative humidity (%)	65	64	67	69	70	72	71	67	65	65	66	67	67
Average dew point °C (°F)	9.6 (49.3)	9.9 (49.8)	9.3 (48.7)	7.9 (46.2)	6.4 (43.5)	4.9 (40.8)	4.4 (39.9)	4.2 (39.6)	4.6 (40.3)	5.7 (42.3)	7.3 (45.1)	8.6 (47.5)	6.9 (44.4)
Source: Bureau of Meteorology (1980-2009 normals & extremes)

== History ==
Nubeena Post Office opened on 1 December 1886. The first postmaster was Joseph Thornton (1813–1899) who carried the mail between Wedge Bay to Premaydena, then Impression Bay.

The town possesses a police station and a branch of the Country Women's Association.
