= Tasman Island Group =

Island group in southeast Tasmania, Australia

- Location within Tasmania
- Etymology: Abel Tasman

Geography
- Location: Tasman Sea
- Coordinates: 43°13′48″S 148°00′00″E
- Total islands: 4
- Major islands: Dart; The Lanterns; Tasman; Wedge

Administration
- Australia
- State: Tasmania

Additional information
- Time zone: AEST (UTC+10)
  - Summer (DST): AEDT (UTC+11)

The Tasman Island Group is a group of islands near the Tasman Peninsula in south-east Tasmania, Australia.

The islands in this group lie within Tasman National Park, and they include Clydes Island, Dart Island, Tasman Island, The Lanterns and Wedge Island.

== See also ==
- List of islands of Tasmania
