= Lantern (disambiguation) =

A lantern is a portable lighting device used to illuminate broad areas.

Lantern or Lanterns may also refer to:

- Roof lantern, an architectural term to describe a structure above a dome, or other roof, with openings to admit light or air
- Stage lighting instrument used in theatre and television
- A large window above a stage, used before stage lighting to illuminate the action
- The structure enclosing the light and lens of a lighthouse
- Lantern frame, a machine used to wind cotton in an Arkwright-type mill
- Lantern (software), a free peer-to-peer internet censorship circumvention software
- Lantern, primary search platform of the Media History Digital Library
- Lantern (horse), Australian racehorse and winner of the 1864 Melbourne Cup

== Television ==
- "Lantern" (Better Call Saul), an episode of Better Call Saul
- Lanterns (TV series), a DC Universe (DCU) television series based on the Green Lanterns

== Music ==
- Lantern (Clogs album), 2006
- Lantern (Hudson Mohawke album), 2015
- Lanterns (Son Lux album), 2013
- Lanterns (A Very Loud Death album), 2017
- Lanterns (36 Crazyfists album), 2017
- Lanterns (song), a song by Birds of Tokyo
- "Lantern", a 2018 track by Toby Fox from Deltarune Chapter 1 OST from the video game Deltarune

== See also ==
- Cage gear, also called a lantern gear or lantern pinion. A type of gear with cylindrical rods for teeth
- Chinese lantern (disambiguation)
- Green Lantern, a DC Comics superhero
- Lantern (Media History Digital Library), a search platform for the Wisconsin Center for Film and Theater Research
- Lanterns of the Dead, an architectural name for the small towers in stone found mainly in the center and west of France
- The Lanterns, small Tasmanian islands, Australia
- The Lantern (disambiguation)
