= Eaglehawk Neck =

Isthmus in Tasmania, Australia

Teralina / Eaglehawk Neck Eaglehawk Neck
- Isthmus
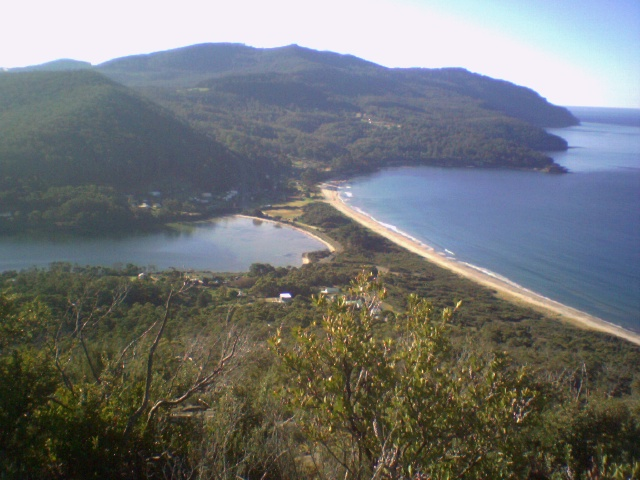
- Eaglehawk Neck from Martin Cash's lookout.

- Location within Tasmania
- Coordinates: 43°01′00″S 147°55′33″E
- Location: Forestier Peninsula and Tasman Peninsula in south-eastern Tasmania, Australia

Dimensions
  - Length: 400 metres (1,300 ft)
  - Width: 30 metres (98 ft)
- Designation: Tasman National Park; World Heritage Site (part)
- LGA: Tasman
- Website: eaglehawkneck.com

Eaglehawk Neck, officially Teralina / Eaglehawk Neck, is a narrow isthmus that connects the Tasman Peninsula with the Forestier Peninsula and hence to the rest of Tasmania, Australia.

It is about 26 kilometres (16 mi) north-east of the town of Nubeena in the local government area of Tasman in the South-east region of Tasmania. At the 2016 census, the locality had a population of 385.

== Location and features ==
The isthmus is around 400 metres (1,300 ft) long and less than 30 metres (98 ft) wide at its narrowest point. The location features rugged terrain and several unusual geological formations including the Tessellated Pavement. Clyde Island, at the northern entry to Pirates Bay, is accessible for crossings at low tide and is the site of two graves, and a rumbling blow hole that cleaves the island.

Eaglehawk Neck is a holiday destination. On the eastern side, a beach that stretches around Pirates' Bay is a popular surfing area. In summer the population rises as people return to their holiday homes.

Eaglehawk Neck
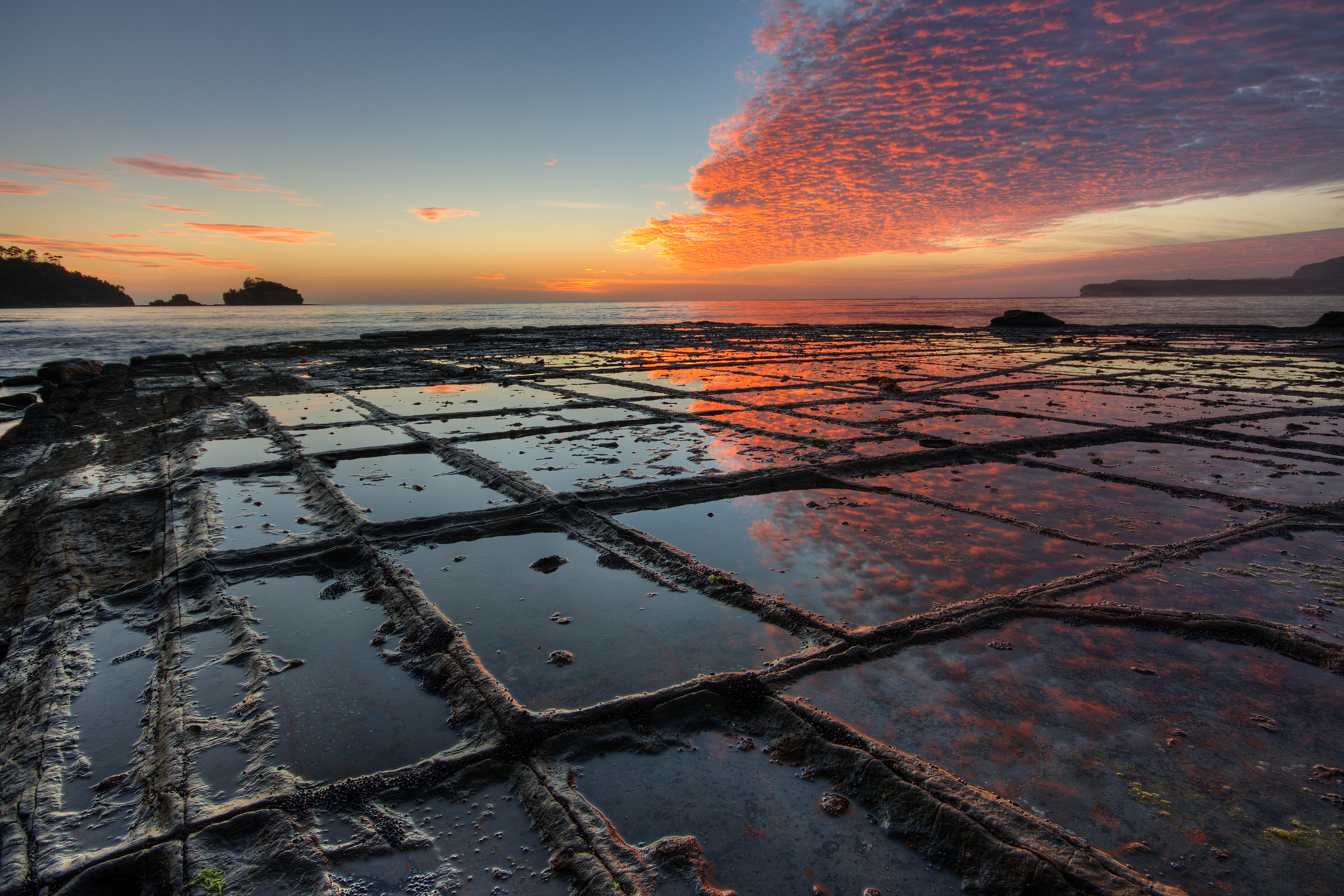
Tessellated Pavement at sunrise

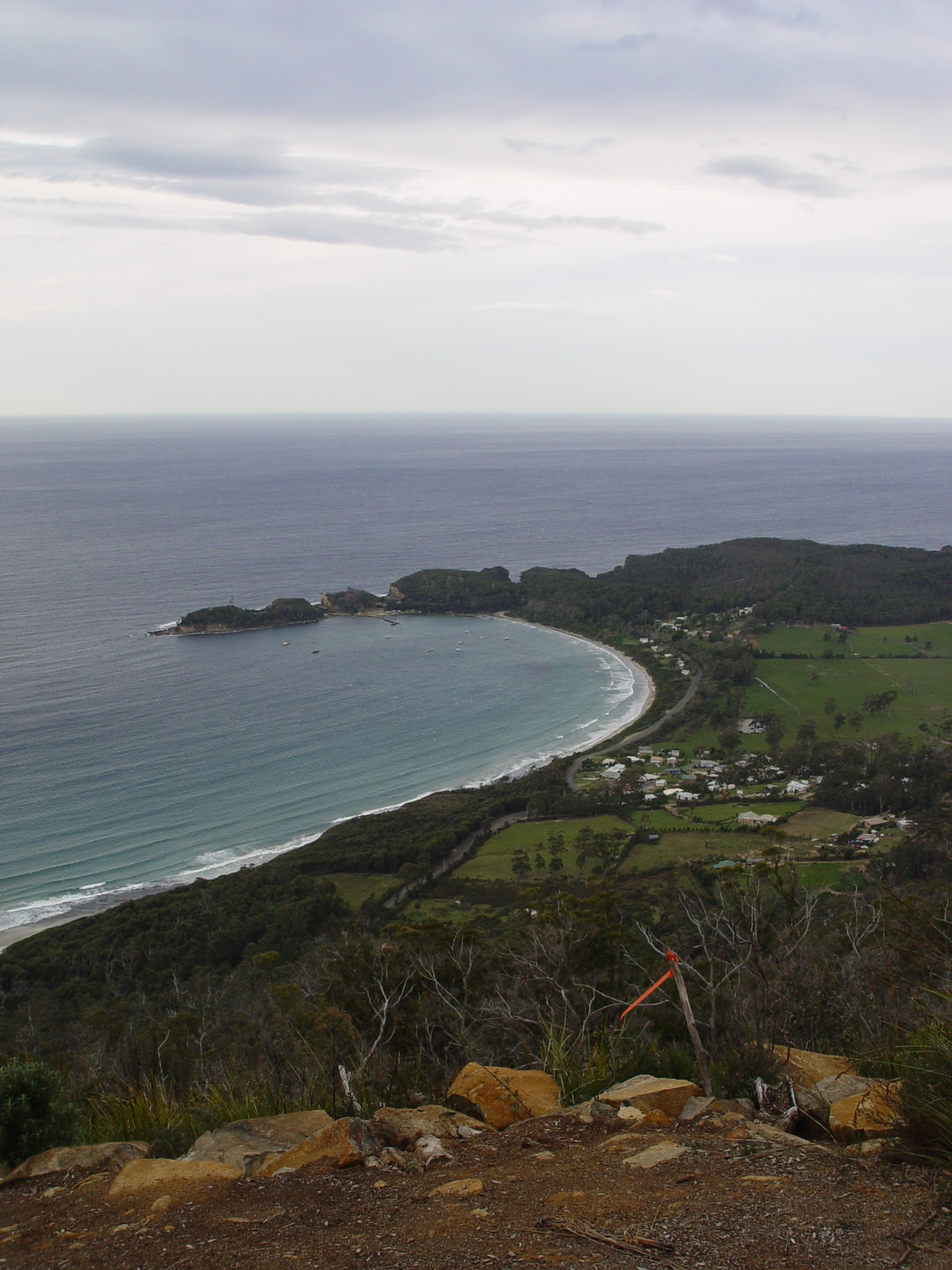
Pirates Bay and Doo Town

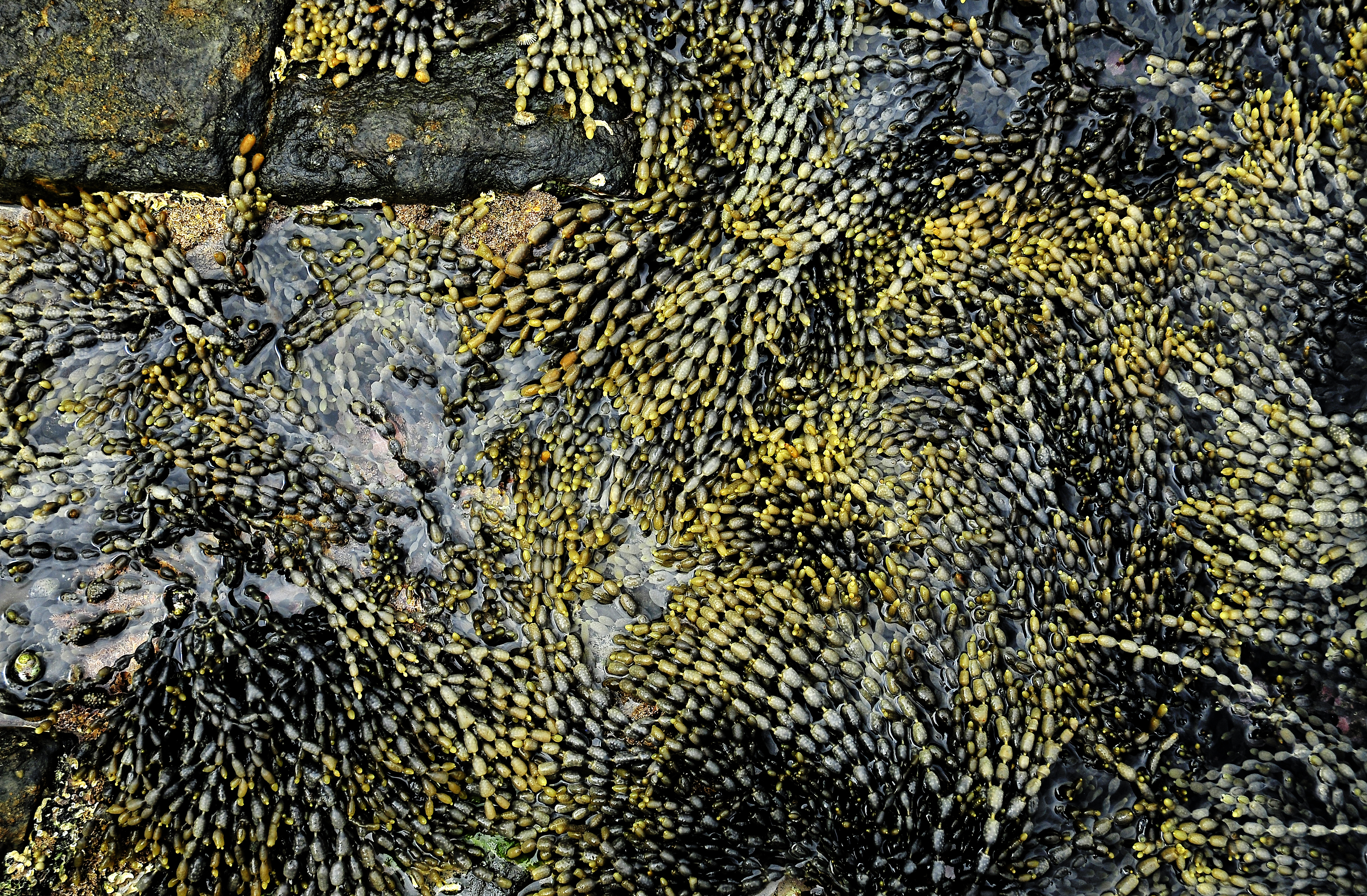
Hormosira growing on the Tesselated pavement at Eaglehawk Neck

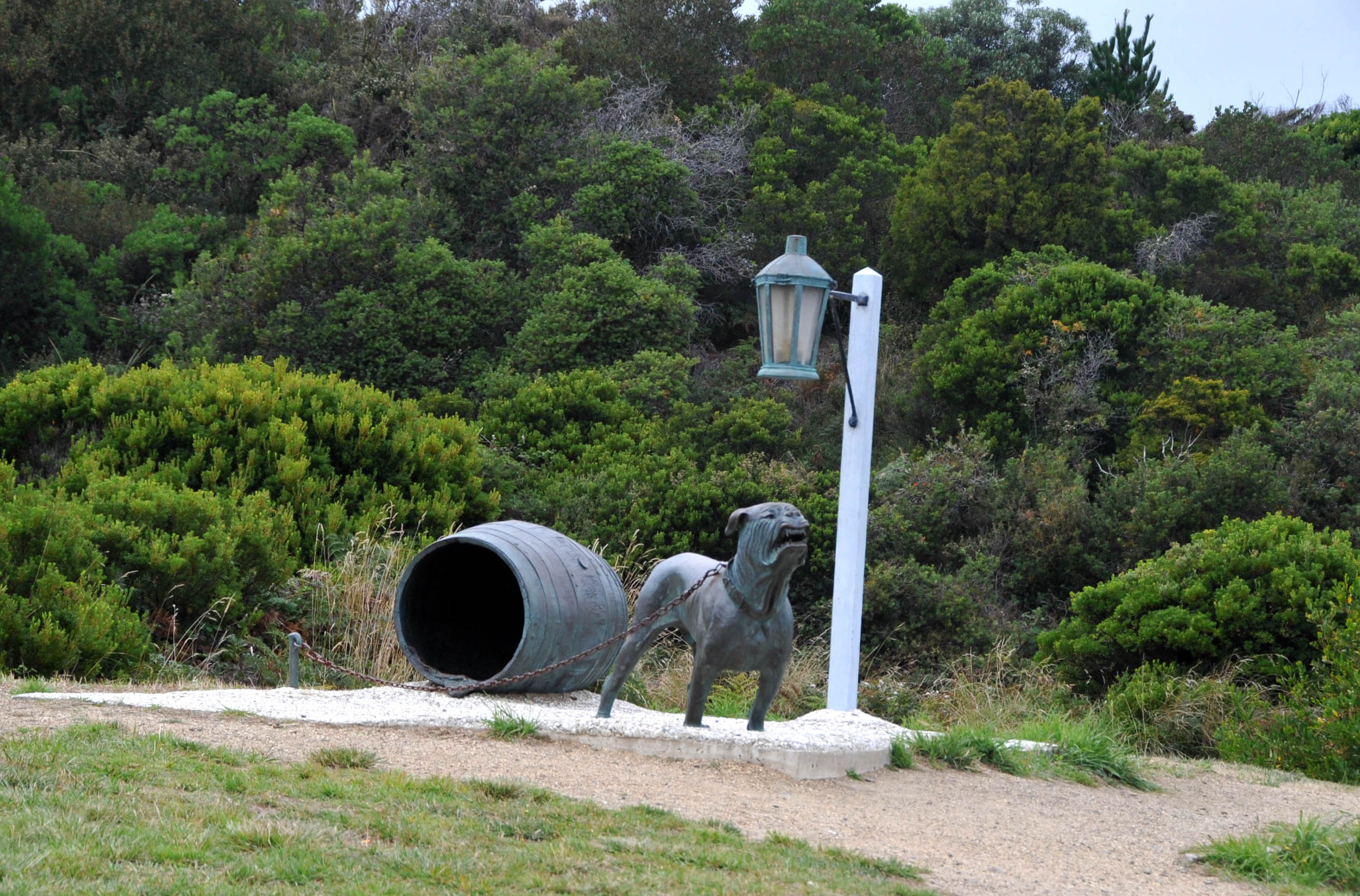
Statue representing the dogline at Eaglehawk Neck

== European history ==
Eaglehawk Neck was gazetted as a locality in 1967. It was dual named in March 2021 to include its original name, Teralina.

=== The Dog Line ===
As Eaglehawk Neck forms a natural thin gateway between the peninsulas, it was used by the British as a place to stop convicts attempting to escape from Port Arthur and other penal institutions on the Tasman Peninsula. A system was developed where a line of dogs were chained to posts across the "Neck" to warn of any convicts attempting to escape. The Dog Line was first implemented in 1831 and was used until the closure of Port Arthur in the 1870s.

Thomas Lempriere, a commissary officer at Port Arthur, declared the Eaglehawk Neck as "impassable". Despite this, many attempts were made by convicts to escape from the Tasman Peninsula via Eaglehawk Neck, including Martin Cash and William Bannon. The area was heavily patrolled by soldiers, and the guards' quarters still remains as a museum.

The isthmus now provides road access via the Arthur Highway to Port Arthur, part of the Australian Convict Sites, a World Heritage Site that comprises eleven remnant penal sites originally built within the British Empire during the 18th and 19th centuries on fertile Australian coastal strips. Collectively, these sites, including Port Arthur, now represent, "...the best surviving examples of large-scale penal transportation and the colonial expansion of European powers through the presence and labour of convicts".

=== Post office ===
The first Eagle Hawk Neck post office was open from 1875 until 1877. A post office opened on 11 January 1895 and closed in 1974.

== Geography ==
The shores of Norfolk Bay and Eaglehawk Neck form the western boundary, while the Tasman Sea forms the eastern.

== Road infrastructure ==
The A9 route (Arthur Highway) enters from the north and runs through to the south-west, where it exits. Route C338 (Blowhole Road / Tasmans Arch Road) starts at an intersection with A9 in the centre and runs south-east until it ends at Tasman Arch.

== See also ==
- Clydes Island
- Geography of Tasmania
