= Ryan Robinson (highliner) =

American highliner

Personal information
- Full name: Ryan Paul Robinson
- Nationality: American
- Born: October 2, 1982 (age 44)
- Home town: Folsom, California

Sport
- Sport: Slacklining (highline)

Ryan Paul Robinson (born October 2, 1982) is an American highliner and professional adventure athlete, known online as Handsome Robinson. In 2019 he set a world record for the longest highline between two bridges, walking 1,919 feet (585 m) across the American River in Folsom, California.

== Early life ==
Robinson grew up in Folsom, California. Before highlining he did mountaineering, climbing, bike trials and competitive triathlon. He has completed more than 100 races, including half and full Ironman competitions.

== Highlining career ==
Ryan Robinson walked his first highline in 2011. He practiced on a slackline close to the ground for about a year before moving to highlines. He also learned climbing, technical ascents, anchoring and rope work in order to rig them. He lived in a van for six years to focus on travel and training, and he earns his living through sponsorships and media work.

In 2015 he became the first person to cross the chasm at Cape Pillar in Tasmania, Australia, on a highline. A 2016 video of him walking a line on the Moai Tower, a 105-foot (32 m) rock formation in Fortescue Bay, Tasmania, was nominated for a GoPro award. As of 2021 his longest highline walk was 2,900 feet (880 m). He has walked a 704-foot (215 m) line blindfolded and has highlined in China, Brazil and Yosemite.

=== 2019 Folsom bridge walk ===
On May 4, 2019, during Folsom's centennial celebration of the Rainbow Bridge, Robinson walked a 1,919-foot (585 m) line from Natomas Crossing to the city's Historic Truss Bridge, about 50 feet (15 m) above the American River. Crowds watched from both bridges and from kayaks below, and he finished in under an hour. CNN described it as a world record for the longest highline between two bridges. Speaking to ABC10 about when he started in the sport, Robinson said, "The sport wasn't in any position to be able to rig this kind of line."

== Other athletics ==
Robinson has appeared on the NBC competition American Ninja Warrior four times.
