= The Lantern (disambiguation) =

The Lantern (1881–present) is the official, daily student-published university newspaper at The Ohio State University.

The Lantern may also refer to:

- The Lantern, comedic paper edited by John Brougham
- The Lantern, South Australian satirical newspaper owned by Frank Skeffington Carroll
- The Lantern (Cape newspaper), early newspaper of the Cape Colony
- The Lantern (1925 film), Czech film directed by Karel Lamač
- The Lantern (1938 film), Czech film directed by Karel Lamač
- "The Lantern (song)", by the Rolling Stones

== See also ==
- Lantern (disambiguation)
- The Lanterns, islands in the Tasman Island Group
