= Cape Pillar =

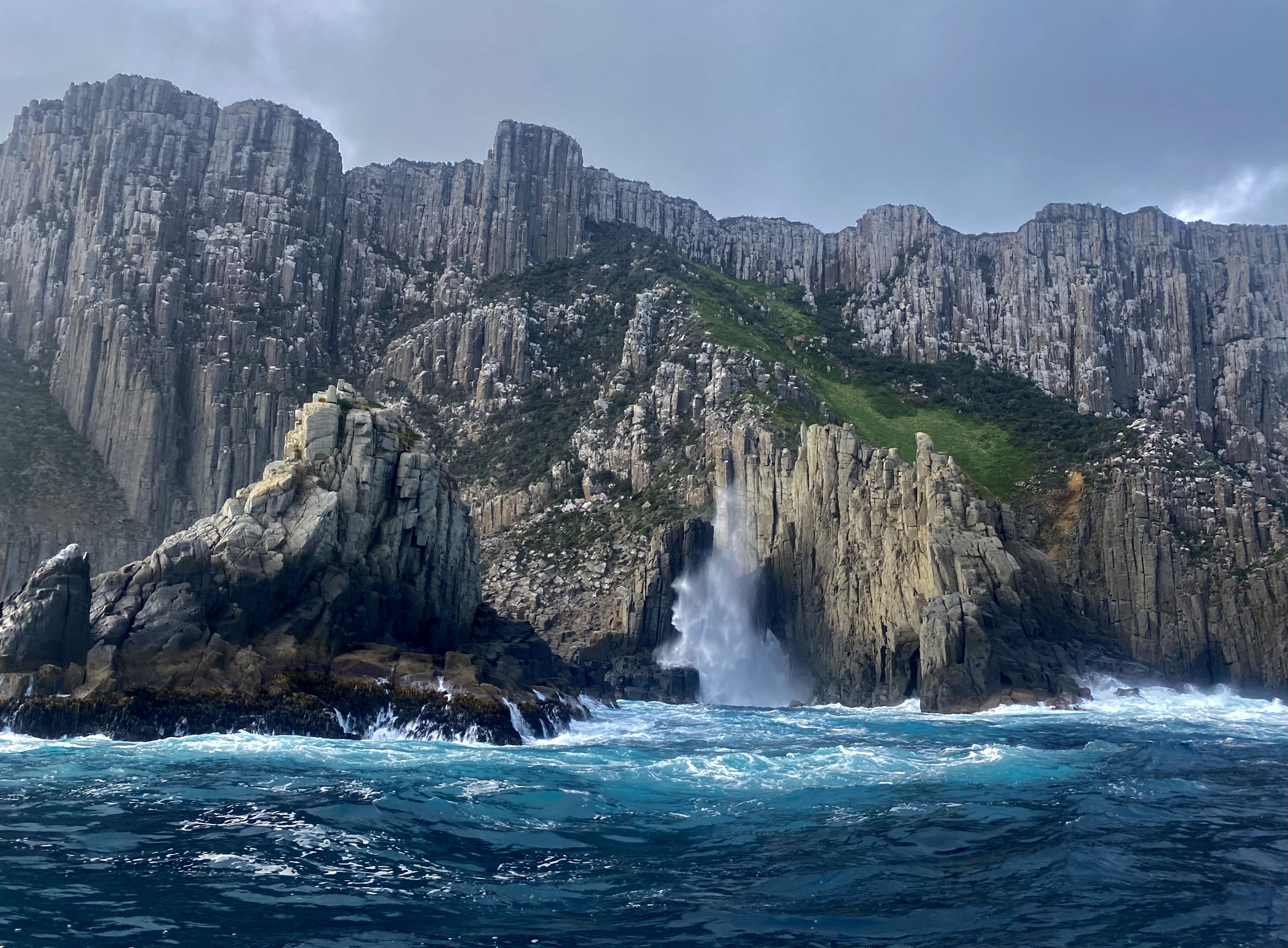
- Cape Pillar sea cliffs from the ocean, 2022

- Coordinates: 43°11′13″S 147°57′05″E
- Country: Australia
- State: Tasmania
- Region: South-east
- LGA: Tasman
- Location: 27 km (17 mi) SE of Nubeena

Government
  - State electorate: Lyons
  - Federal division: Lyons

Population
  - Total: 4 (2016 census)
- Postcode: 7182
Localities around Cape Pillar
Fortescue	Fortescue	Fortescue
Port Arthur	Cape Pillar	Tasman Sea
Tasman Sea	Tasman Sea	Tasman Sea

Cape Pillar is a cape on the southern end of the Tasman National Park in south eastern Tasmania that overlooks Tasman Island. Its 300m high sea cliffs are the tallest in the Southern Hemisphere. It has become more popular with bushwalkers since the opening of the Three Capes Track.

== Geology ==
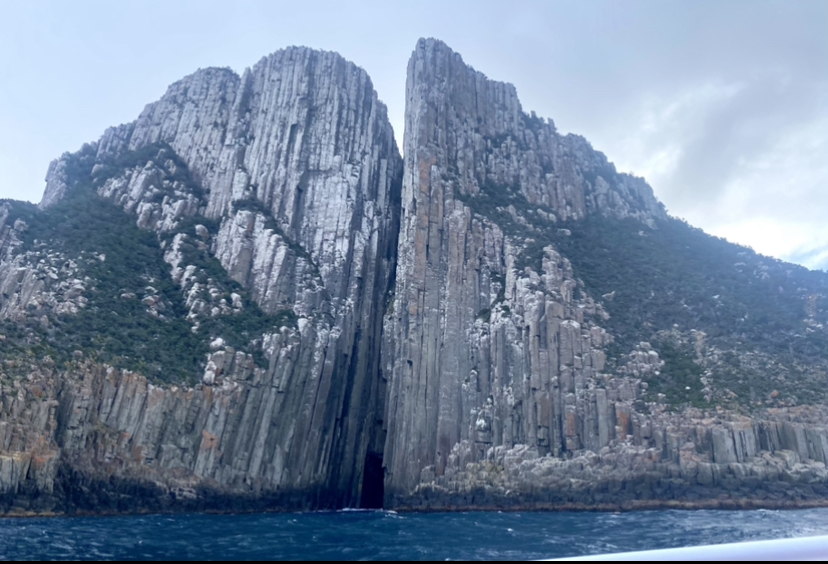
Cape Pillar cliffs, 2022

The cliffs of Cape Pillar are made of Jurassic dolerite, which came from an magma intrusion ~175Mya, which occurred across Tasmania. As they've cooled they formed into hexagonal pillars in an example of columnar jointing.

The 300m tall cliffs are the highest in the southern hemisphere.

== History ==
=== Naming ===
The is no recorded Aboriginal name for Cape Pillar, however the Tasman Peninsula was called Tukana/Turrakana.

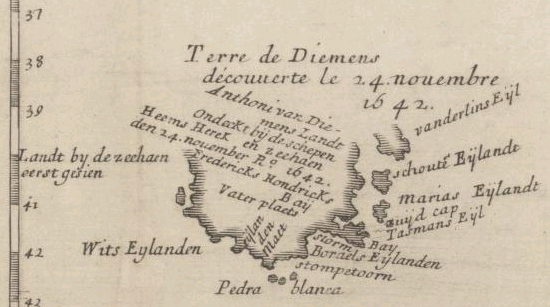
Tasmania as charted by Tasman in 1642

The first European to map the Cape was Abel Tasman, who surveyed southern Tasmania in 1642 expedition. The cape in its approximate location was labelled Zuyd Caep on his charts.

During John Henry Cox's 1789 voyage past south eastern Tasmania it was charted as Cape Pillar.

It has been captured in illustrations as early as 1824 and later.

It is a reference point on the coast for mapping by Australian navy hydrographic service.

== Ecology ==
The Allocasuarina crassa (Allocasuarina crassa) is endemic to the 20 km^{2} area surrounding Cape Pillar and on the nearby Tasman Island. It is sensitive to high frequency fire (but like many Australian plants requires fire to germinate), and the root rot.

Whales have been sighted in the area.

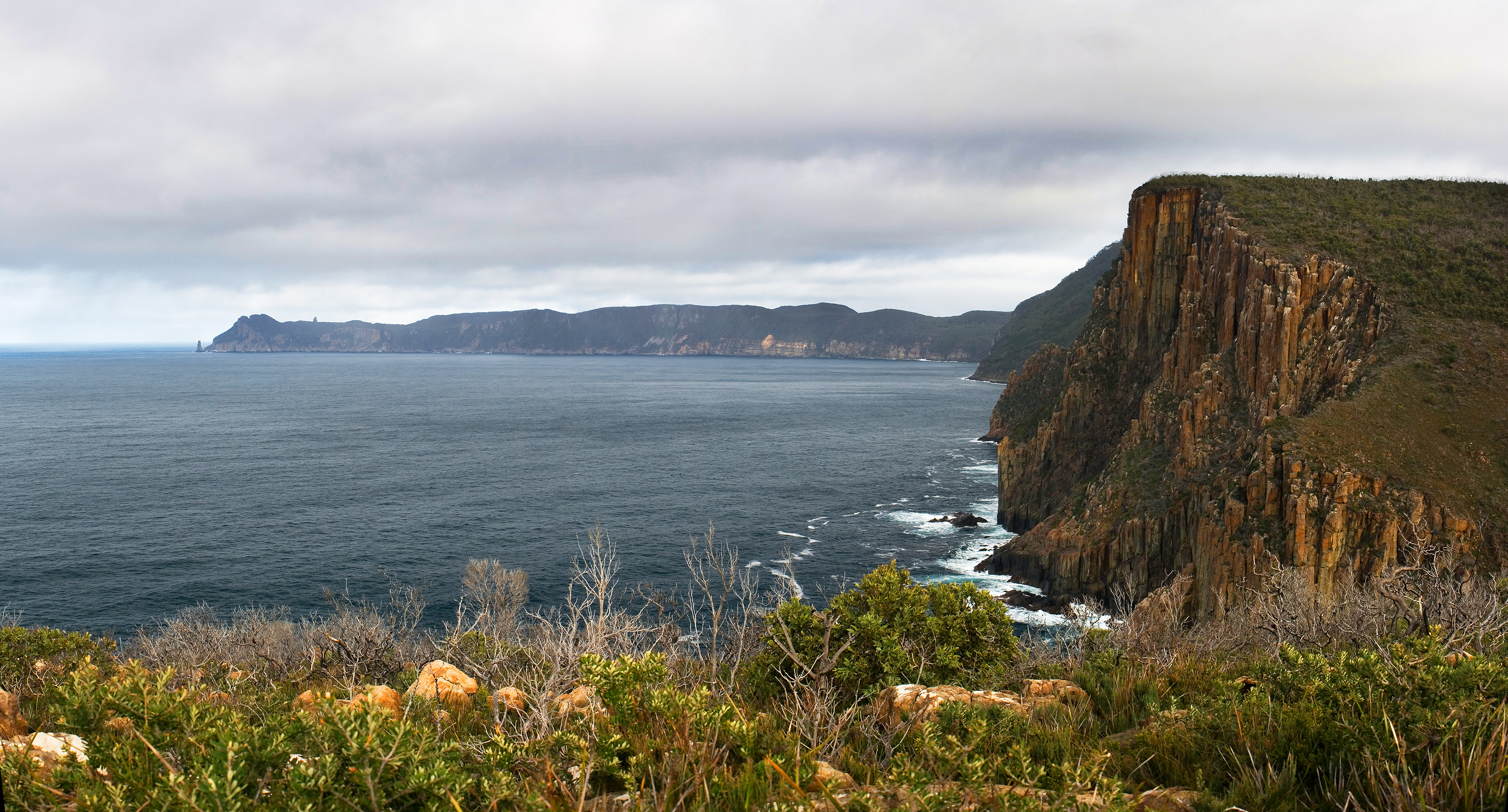
Cape Pillar seen from Cape Hauy track

== Visitation ==
It is accessible from land via the Three Capes Track, a popular bushwalk.

The nearest road is Fortescue Bay Road (Route C344) which passes to the north of the National Park.

== Locality ==
Cape Pillar is also the name of a rural locality in the Tasman Council, entirely located within the Tasman National Park, encompassing the cape. It had a 2016 population of four.
