= Doo Town =

Coordinates: 43°02′S 147°56′E

Doo Town Tasmania
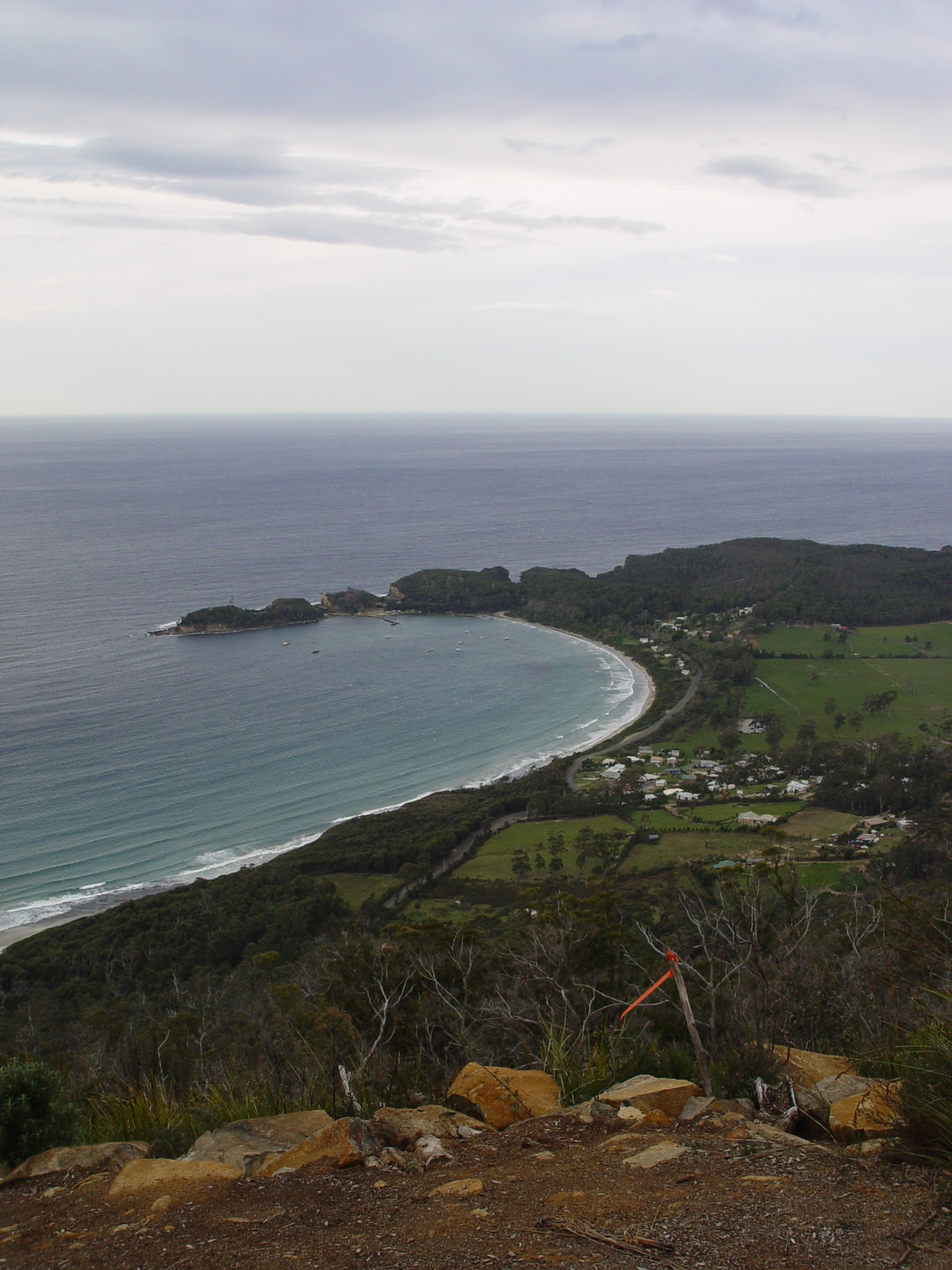
- Doo Town on Pirates Bay
- Population: 230 (?)
- LGA(s): Tasman Council

Doo Town is a Tasmanian holiday village within the locality of Eaglehawk Neck, near Port Arthur, where the house names contain “doo”.

== History ==
Located 79 km southeast of country's capital Hobart, Doo Town was established in the 1830s as an unnamed timber station which eventually developed into a shack community. In 1935 a Hobart architect, Eric Round, placed the name plate Doo I 99 on his weekend shack. A neighbour, Charles Gibson, responded with a plate reading Doo Me, then Bill Eldrige with Doo Us. Eric Round's shack was later renamed Xanadu or Xanadoo.

The trend caught on and most of the homes have a plate that includes the name 'Doo'. Some shacks play on the theme, with 'do' and even 'du' variations.

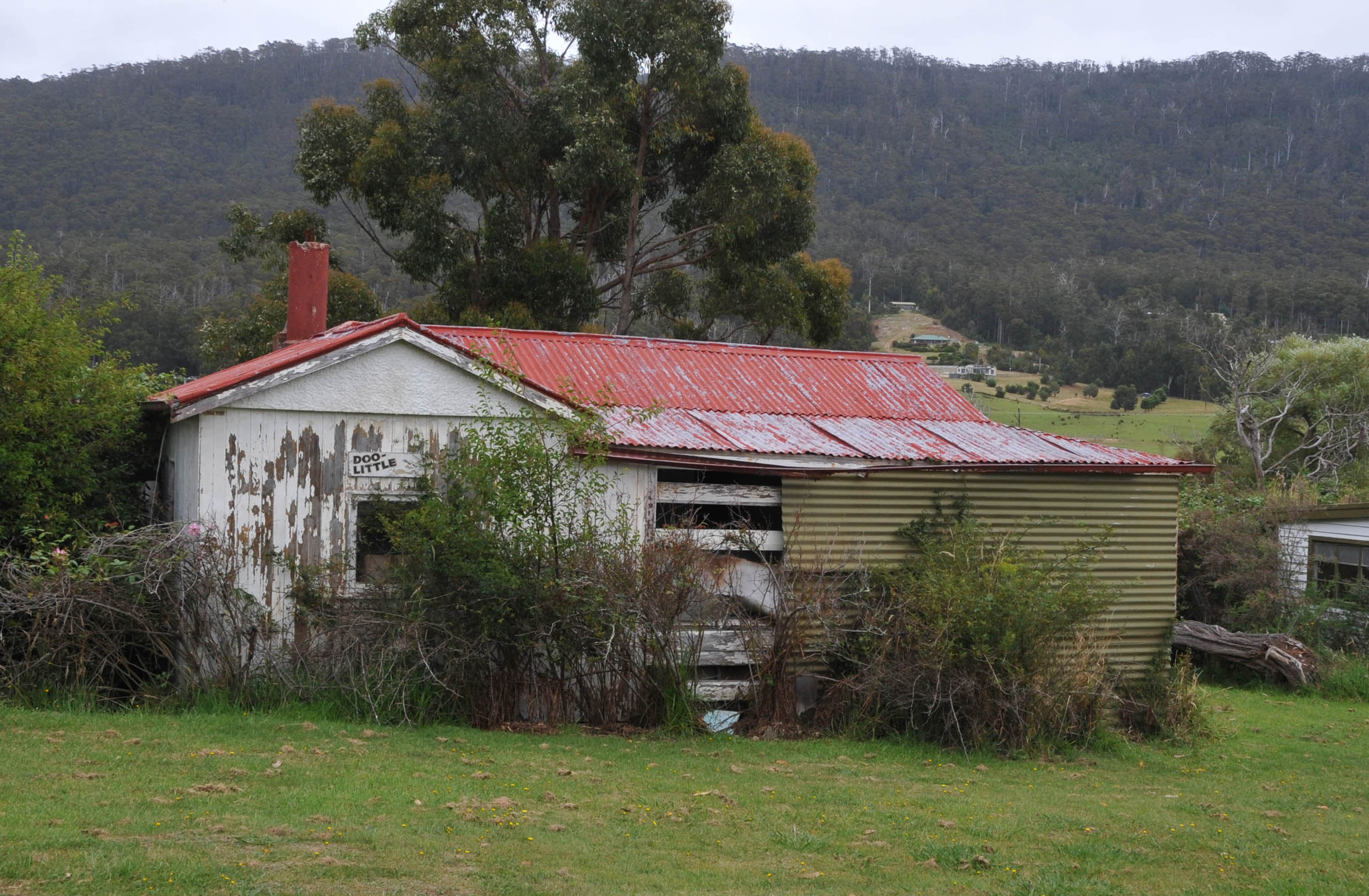
Doo-Little

== House names ==
Af-2-Doo, Da Doo Ron Ron, Didgeri-Doo, Doo-All, Doo Come In, Doodle Doo, Doo Drop In, Doo For Now, Doo Fuck All, Doo I, Doo-ing it easy, Doo Luv It, Doo-Me, Doo Nix, Doo Not Disturb, Doo Nothing, Doo Often, Doo Us, Doo Us Too, Doo Write, Dr DooLittle, Gunnadoo, Humpty Doo, Just Doo It, Love Me Doo, Make Doo, Much-A-Doo, Rum Doo, Sheil Doo, This Will Doo, Thistle Doo Me, Wattle-I-Doo, Wee-Doo, Xanadu, Yabba Dabba Doo.

Interestingly, the list does not yet contain the names Doo Hast, Baby Shark or Scooby-Doo.

The one non-conforming house has a plate that reads Medhurst.

== In popular culture ==
In 2004, Off Planet Films made a pilot for a television cartoon series set in and named after the Tasmanian town, the cartoon portrayed a "backwater" town full of dodgy characters, rednecks, aliens, strip-clubs and gratuitous nudity.
