= William Bannon =

Willam Bannon
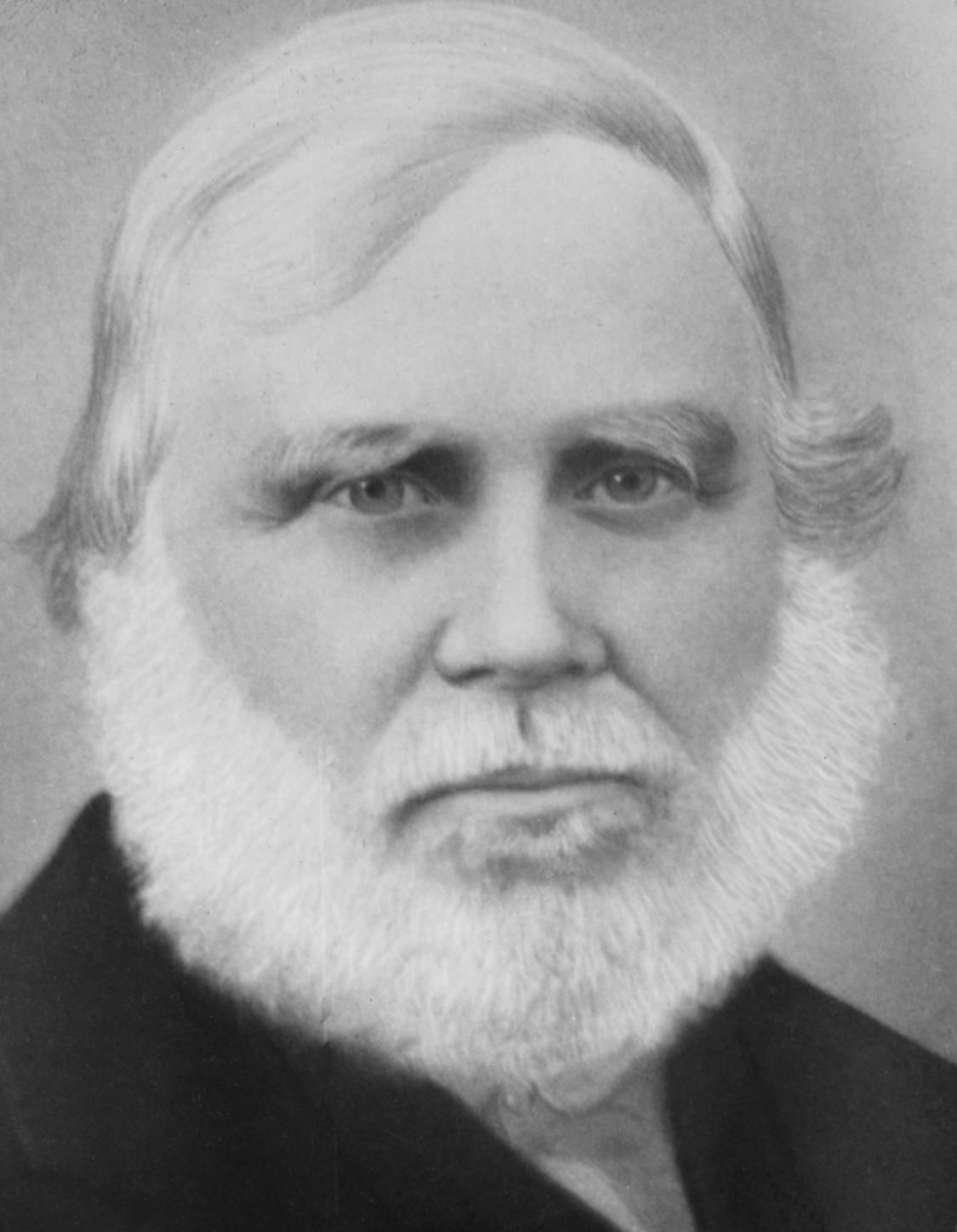
- Bannon, c. 1890
- Born: c. 1826; Ballymahon, County Longford, Ireland
- Died: 27 February 1904 (aged 77–78); Tasmania, Australia
- Occupations: Soldier; convict; emancipated farmer
- Spouse: Harriet Shattock (m. 1857)
- Children: 9

William Bannon (c. 1826 – 27 February 1904) was an Irish-born British soldier, convict, and emancipated farmer. He served in the British 65th Regiment of Foot in the New Zealand Wars in the 1840s. In 1849 he was found guilty of desertion and theft and was sentenced to transportation for seven years to the Colony of Van Diemen's Land (now Tasmania, Australia). A reward was posted for Bannon's capture after he escaped from a prison in Van Diemen's Land and, following his capture, he was transported to the penal settlement of Norfolk Island before returning to Van Diemen's Land.

Bannon was found guilty on charges of desertion, theft, prison escape, extortion, and running an illegal distillery; he was charged and acquitted of various crimes including murder and firearms offences. He was also the police's main suspect for various thefts. On one occasion Bannon secured his acquittal when the jury believed his testimony over that of the police, and on another occasion Bannon was able to personally convince the Governor of Tasmania he should be released from prison.

Bannon became a successful and well respected farmer in Tasmania. He married and had nine children. His descendants include Christine Milne, the former leader of the Australian Greens, Cameron Scott, a prominent Tasmanian criminal barrister, and John Hancox, a grandchild who gave his life as an ANZAC at Gallipoli.

== Early life ==
Bannon was born in Ballymahon in the County Longford, Ireland in c. 1826. He had two brothers, John and Thomas. His mother's name was Margaret, and the family was Catholic. Bannon was recruited into the 65th Regiment of Foot and travelled on the Java merchant ship to New Zealand to fight in the New Zealand Wars that were taking place between the Māori people and the British colonial government. Bannon departed Woolwich in May 1846 on the Java, and arrived initially in Hobart Town, Van Diemen's Land on 5 October 1846, before travelling to Sydney, and then on to New Zealand in November 1846.

== Convictism ==
=== Transportation to Van Diemen's Land ===
While serving at Whanganui in January 1849, Bannon was found guilty of desertion and was sentenced to four months. In December 1849 Bannon was tried in the Supreme Court for the theft of a number of items from the property of Captain James Lewis Smith at Te Aro. The theft included £25, a gold chain, a breguet key, and two gold pins. He was found guilty of the crime and sentenced to seven years to be served in Van Diemens Land. Newspaper reports around the time of Bannon's crimes noted that a private in the 65th Regiment had purportedly committed several robberies with the intention of being transported to Van Diemen's Land due to the favourable reports of previously transported soldiers. Bannon traveled from Wellington on board the Sisters ship, arriving in Hobart Town via Sydney on 23 January 1850. There were two other prisoners on board. Aged 23 years, according to convict records, Bannon was unable to read or write.

=== Transportation to Norfolk Island ===
Bannon was moved to the Cascades Probation Station, a penal institution on the Tasman Peninsular near Port Arthur. Bannon was able to escape to the mainland through the infamous 'dog-line' at Eaglehawk Neck. The dog-line was a line of savage dogs guarding the small isthmus between the Tasman Peninsular and the mainland that Thomas J. Lempriere, a commissary officer at Port Arthur, declared as 'impassable‘. The Government Gazette dated 15 October 1850 declared a reward was available for Bannon's capture. Bannon was eventually captured and was sentenced to 18 months hard labour to be served on Norfolk Island. Bannon sailed on the Franklin arriving at Norfolk Island on 9 December 1850.

At the time of Bannon's arrival Norfolk Island had been reopened for the second time as a penal settlement and was under the governorship of John Giles Price. Price was well known for his brutal and somewhat extreme management of prison discipline. While on Norfolk Island Bannon was sentenced to numerous infringements relating to disobedience, resulting in months of hard labour while chained.

=== Return to Van Diemen's Land ===
The Lord Auckland arrived at Port Arthur, Tasmania in April 1853, returning Bannon to Van Diemen's Land along with 61 other male convicts. Bannon was subsequently moved to the Prison Barracks at Hobart, prior to being allowed into private service. While in private service Bannon was found guilty of seeking to extort additional wages and was sentenced to 14 days solitary. He was returned to gaol for an additional offense in December 1853, ultimately settling near Table Cape.

== Subsequent life ==
Bannon's ticket of leave was issued 9 January 1855, and a conditional pardon was issued 20 March 1856. He became a successful farmer.

=== Murder charges and acquittal ===
In 1858, Bannon was charged with the murder of Samuel Oaks. Oaks was found murdered, shot, brutally beaten and partially burned, on 5 May 1858 on what was then known as "New Road" at Table Cape, Tasmania, close to what is now called "Murdering Gully Road". Bannon was known to be on disagreeable terms with Oaks and was subsequently tried for Oaks' murder. Bannon was found not guilty and was released. No one else was charged with the murder.

=== Distillery and imprisonment ===
In February 1866 Bannon was held in Launceston gaol prior to trial, accused of wounding horses, before the charges were dismissed and Bannon was released. In April 1869 the local police accused Bannon of stealing four small pigs, again without a prosecution.

In July 1870, Bannon was once again imprisoned at Launceston gaol. The charges were for 'illicit distillation' and unlawfully aiming a firearm at the police. On 21 July 1870, at the Torquay Police Court, Bannon pleaded not guilty to the distillery charge. The co-accused on the distillation charge, William Foster, pleaded guilty. Bannon and Foster were found guilty. Bannon was fined £200 and Foster £50. Both were unable to pay their fines and were kept at the Launceston gaol until the fines could be paid.

At a subsequent court case on the firearm charge the jury did not believe the police testimony and Bannon was found not guilty of the firearm offence. Bannon remained in custody as he was unable to pay the £200 fine for the illegal distillery.

In November 1870, the Governor of Tasmania, Sir Charles Du Cane, visited the prison and Bannon appealed directly to the Governor for his release; and was released the following month.

A number of letters were sent to local papers about the injustice of Bannon's case and concerns about police behaviour. A letter from ‘Justitia’, a reference to Lady Justice, written while Bannon was still in gaol, called for him to be released, pointing to the ‘not guilty’ verdict and the impact on Bannon's young family. Bannon wrote a letter to the press following his release detailing accusations of poor police behaviour. The editor called for a ‘more rigid sort of investigation’ into the complaints raised, indicating a pattern of poor behaviour by the local police. Bannon wrote a second letter in February 1871 noting that the police refused to return his clothing that had been taken at the time of his arrest.

A reward of £100 was approved and paid to John Reynolds, the Torquay Chief District Constable, for the conviction of Bannon on the distillery charges. This reward further brought into question the motivation of the police involved.

=== Stealing charge ===
In 1879 Bannon was charged with stealing a pair of bullock yokes, and a pair of bows, together valued at ten shillings. Edward Hancox, also a former convict and the local blacksmith, appeared as a witness for Bannon, and testified that he'd made Bannon the yokes that had been found in his possession. Bannon was found not guilty. Hancox's son, John, later married Bannon's daughter, Sarah Jane.

In October 1880 Bannon was considered a suspect in the theft of a number of sheep.

== Personal life ==
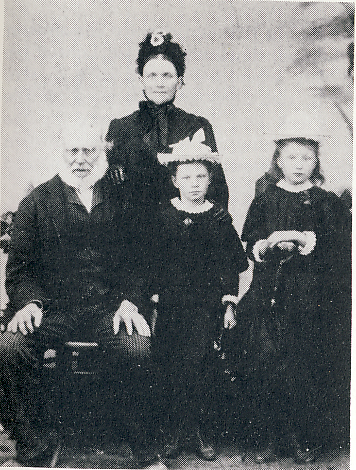
William and Harriet Bannon, with Florence and Mary Hancox (grandchildren)

William Bannon married Harriet Shattock in 1857; a servant, originally from Somerset, who travelled from Plymouth with a family on board the Blackwall clipper Sussex, via Port Phillip Bay, and arrived in October 1855.

They had nine children. Sarah, his first child, was born within months of his acquittal for the murder of Oaks in 1858. According to her grave headstone, Harriet Bannon, his sixth child, died on Christmas Day 1870, aged one year, which was within a week of his release from Launceston gaol on the distillery issue.

Bannon became a widely-known and respected farmer. The distinctive “Stone House", also referred to as the "Haunted House", at Sassafras, said to be one of the better known landmarks in the area for over 70 years, was built for Bannon using sandstone quarried near his property, and was torn down in 1948. The Bannon family folklore is that the property was built over a well, causing strange sounds from debris falling into the well.

Bannon and his wife, Harriet, were understood to have separated for a period, with Bannon placing advertisements in the local press cautioning storekeepers not to extend credit to Harriet. Within a year of posting this notice, Bannon died at his residence in Latrobe on 27 February 1904, and was buried in the Catholic section of the Latrobe cemetery. The Bannon family records indicate that the couple reconciled prior to Bannon's death. Harriet Bannon died in 1915 and was buried in the Anglican section of the Railton cemetery.

== Notable relatives ==
Bannon's grandson, John Hancox, was Sarah Jane Hancox's son. He died at Gallipoli on 19 May 1915 while fighting for the Australian and New Zealand Army Corps in the Gallipoli campaign.

Christine Milne, an Australian politician, recognised John Hancox as her grandmother's brother, hence, Milne's great-great-grandfather.
