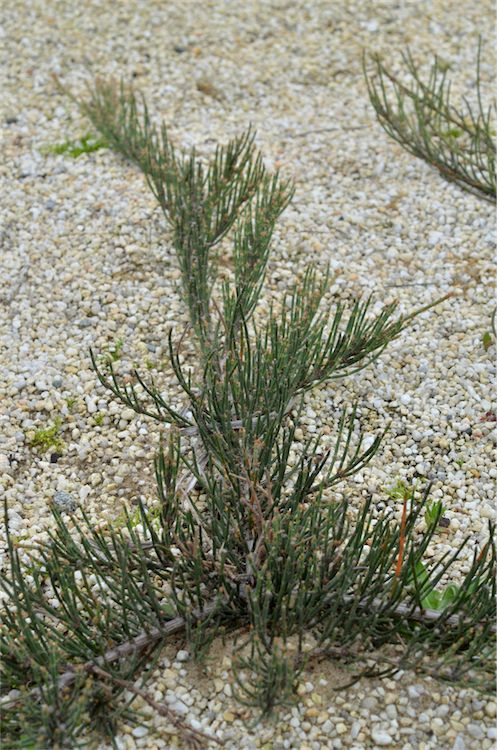
- In Royal Botanic Gardens, Cranbourne

Scientific classification
- Kingdom: Plantae
- Clade: Tracheophytes
- Clade: Angiosperms
- Clade: Eudicots
- Clade: Rosids
- Order: Fagales
- Family: Casuarinaceae
- Genus: Allocasuarina
- Species: A. crassa

Binomial name
- Allocasuarina crassa L.A.S.Johnson
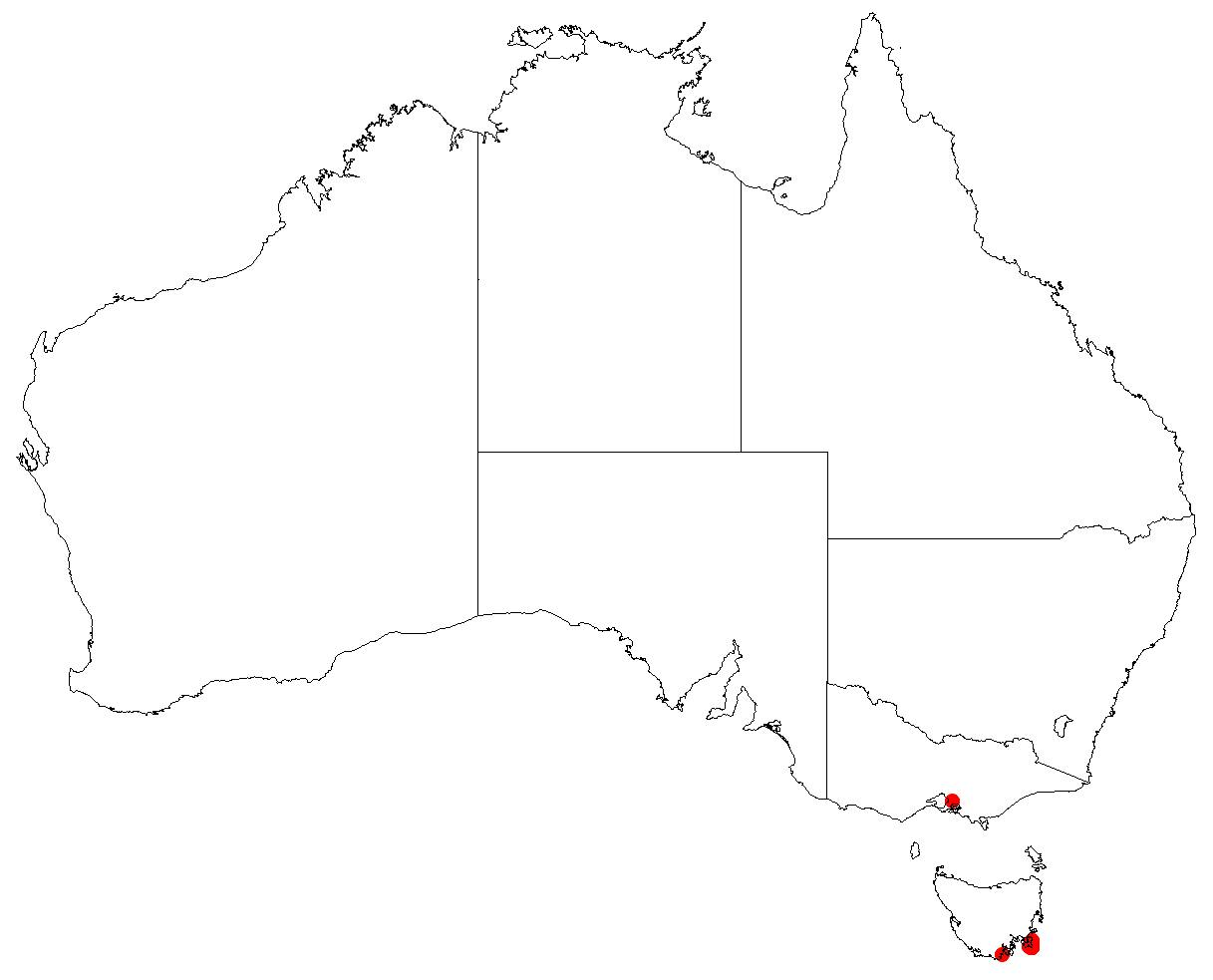
- Occurrence data from AVH

= Allocasuarina crassa =

Species of tree

Allocasuarina crassa, commonly known as Cape Pillar sheoak, is a species of flowering plant in the family Casuarinaceae and is endemic to a small area in far south-eastern Tasmania. It is a low shrub to small tree that is monoecious or dioecious, with spreading to erect branchlets up to 170 mm (6.7 in) long, the leaves reduced to scales in whorls of seven to ten, the fruiting cones 15–34 mm (0.6–1 in) long containing winged seeds (samaras) 5–8 mm (0.2–0.3 in) long.

== Description ==
Allocasuarina crassa is a dioecious or monoecious shrub that typically grows to a height of 1–2 m (3 ft 3 in – 6 ft 7 in), or sometimes a small tree to 14 m (46 ft), and has smooth bark. Its branchlets are spreading to more or less erect, up to 170 mm (7 in) long, the leaves reduced to erect, scale-like teeth 1.1–3 mm (0.04–0.1 in) long, arranged in whorls of seven to ten around the branchlets. The sections of branchlet between the leaf whorls (the "articles") are 10–20 mm (0.4–0.8 in) long and 1.2–2.0 mm (0.05–0.08 in) wide and the furrows along the branchlets are hairy. Male flowers are arranged in spikes about 20 mm (0.8 in) long, the anthers 0.8–1 mm (0.03–0.04 in) long. Female cones are cylindrical and sessile or on a peduncle up to 3 mm (0.1 in) long. Mature cones are 15–34 mm (0.6–1 in) long and 12–15 mm (0.5–0.6 in) in diameter, the samaras black 5–8 mm (0.2–0.3 in) long.

== Taxonomy ==
Allocasuarina crassa was first formally described in 1989 by Lawrie Johnson in the Flora of Australia from specimens collected by Tony Moscal at Cape Pillar in 1976. The specific epithet crassa means 'thick' or 'stout', referring to the thickness of the articles, compared to those of the related A. monolifera and A. zephyrea.

== Distribution and habitat ==
Endemic to Tasmania, A. crassa is restricted to the Cape Pillar area of the Tasman Peninsula and Tasman Island, both of which are in the Tasman National Park where there are about 100,000 mature individuals. It has a linear extent of distribution of 10 km (6.2 mi) with an area of about 20 km^{2} (7.7 sq mi). It grows on dolerite soils in both wet eucalypt forest and in coastal heath and shrubland. On the Cape Pillar plateau it may occur in pure, even-age stands after a long fire-free period.

== Conservation status ==
Allocasuarina crassa is listed as rare under the Tasmanian TSP Act. The main threat is inappropriate fire regimes. It is also sensitive to the introduced soil-borne pathogen Phytophthora cinnamomi.

== Gallery ==
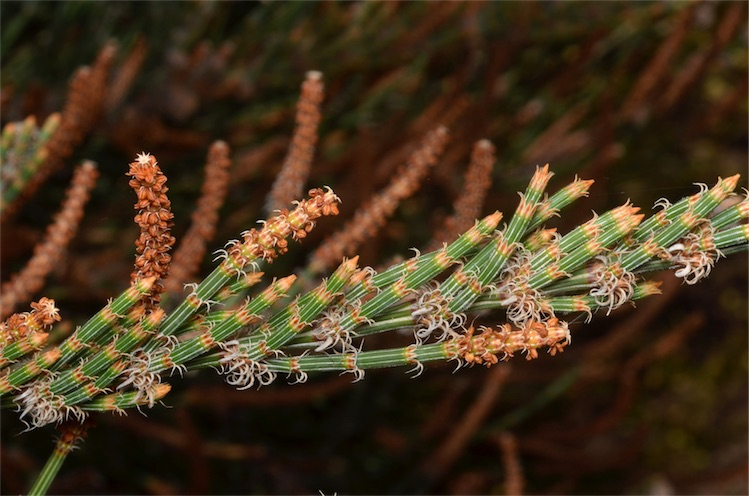
Branchlets and male spikes

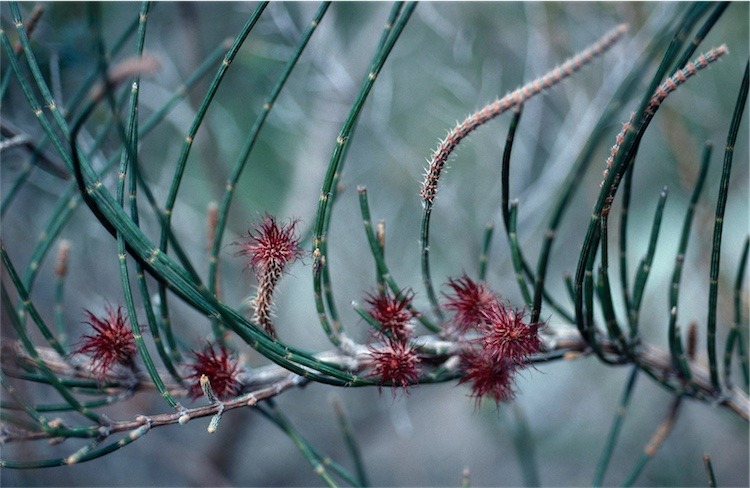
Female cones
