= Wedge Island (Tasmania) =

Island in Tasmania, Australia

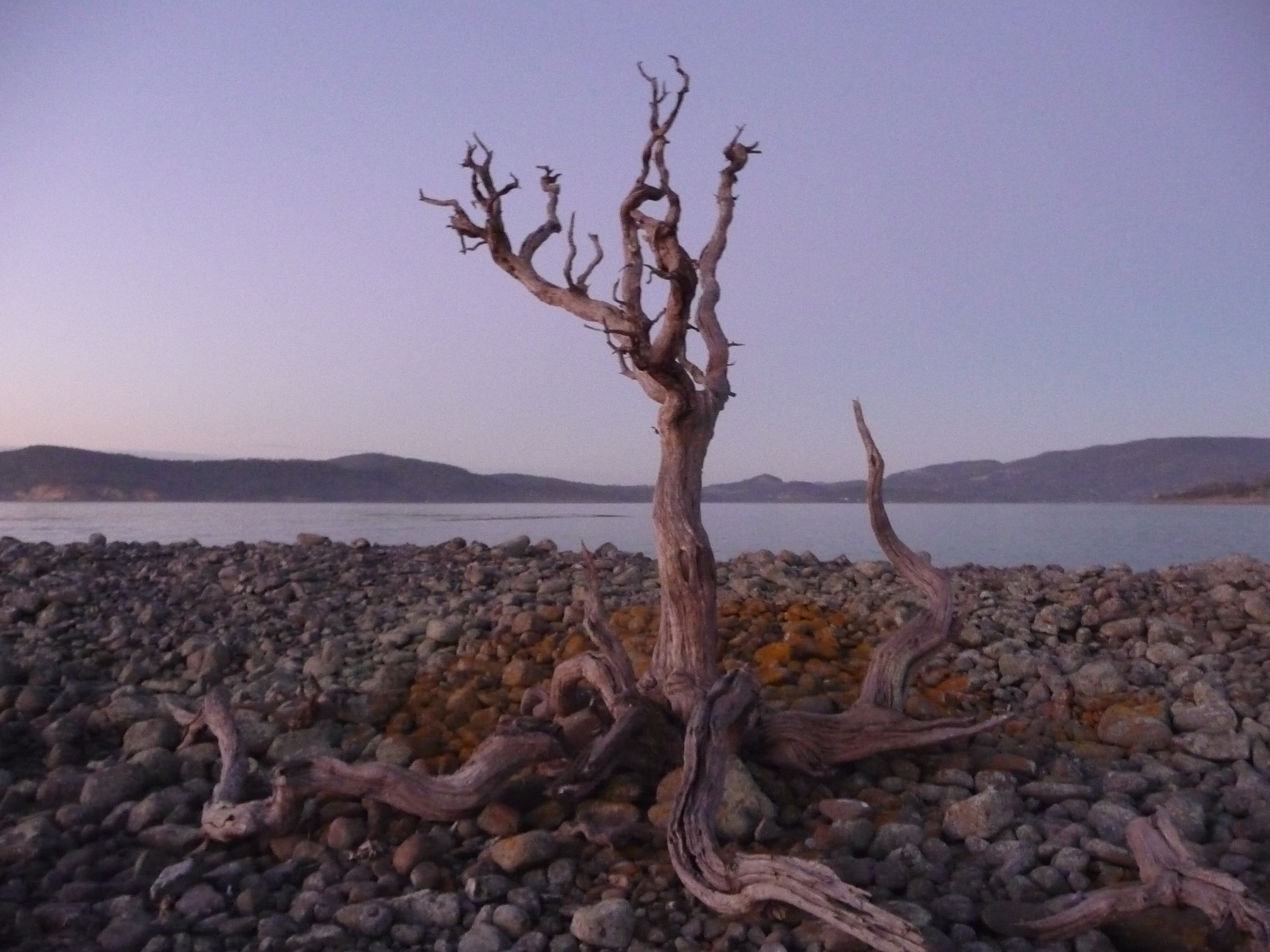
- Shores of Wedge Island

- Location within Tasmania

Geography
- Location: Storm Bay
- Coordinates: 43°07′48″S 147°40′12″E
- Archipelago: Tasman Island Group
- Area: 43 ha (110 acres)

Administration
- Australia
- State: Tasmania

Additional information
- Time zone: AEST (UTC+10)
  - Summer (DST): AEDT (UTC+11)

The Wedge Island, part of the Tasman Island Group, is an island with an area of 43 hectares (110 acres) lying close to the south-eastern coast of Tasmania, Australia. The island is located in Storm Bay, situated off the Tasman Peninsula.

The island is formed of Jurassic dolerite.

== Fauna ==
Recorded breeding seabird species are little penguin and short-tailed shearwater. The island was previously used for sheep grazing, and was regularly burnt. The sheep were removed in 1986. There were also large numbers of European rabbits, now exterminated. Cats were introduced in the 1970s to control the rabbits, and a population of feral cats remains on the island.

It is close to a proposed marine farming zone.

== See also ==
- List of islands of Tasmania
