= Tessellated pavement =

Flat rock surface subdivided by fractures

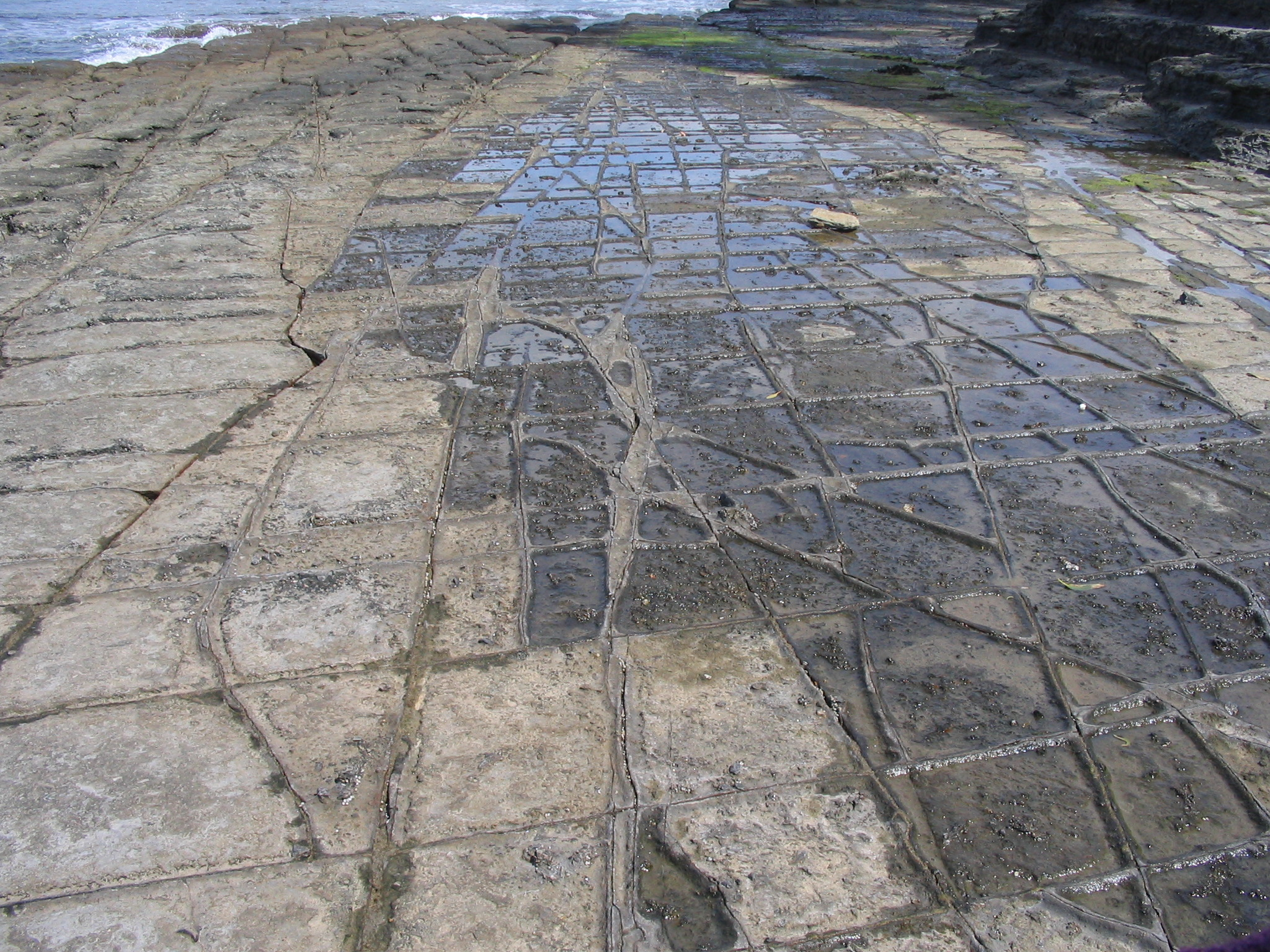
A tessellated pavement at Eaglehawk Neck, Tasmania, where a rock surface has been divided by fractures, producing a set of rectangular blocks

In geology and geomorphology, a tessellated pavement is a relatively flat rock surface that is subdivided into polygons by fractures, frequently systematic joints, within the rock. This type of rock pavement bears this name because it is fractured into polygonal blocks that resemble tiles of a mosaic floor, or tessellations.

== Overview ==
Four types of tessellated pavements are recognized: tessellated pavements formed by jointing; tessellated pavements formed by cooling contraction; tessellations formed by mud cracking and lithification; and tessellated sandstone pavements of uncertain origin.

The most common type of tessellated pavement consists of relatively flat rock surfaces, typically the tops of beds of sandstones and other sedimentary rocks, that are subdivided into either more or less regular rectangles or blocks approaching rectangles by well-developed systematic orthogonal joint systems. The surface of individual beds, as exposed by erosion, are typically divided into either squares, rectangles, and less commonly triangles or other shapes, depending on the number and orientation of the joint sets that comprise the joint system. This relatively flat surface of individual beds of sedimentary rocks are frequently altered by weathering along joints as to cause the bedrock along the joints to be either raised or recessed as the result of differential erosion. This type of tessellated pavement is commonly observed along shorelines where wave action has created relatively flat and extensive wave-cut platforms that expose jointed bedrock and keeps the surfaces of these platforms relatively clear of debris.

The second type of tessellated pavement consists of a bedrock surface that exhibits joints that form polygons that are typically regular in size, spacing, and junctions. Typically, these polygons represent the cross-sections of polygonal, typically hexagonal joints, called columnar jointing, that formed as the result of the cooling of basaltic lava. This type of surface can be seen at the Giant's Causeway in Northern Ireland.

The third type of tesselation recognized by Branagan is associated with the shrinkage and cracking of fine-grained, either clayey or calcareous, sediments. They consist of polygonal cracking, often associated with individual 'plates' that tend to be concave upward, that characterizes the formation of mudcracks in fine-grained sediments. Often, the outlines of the polygons formed by this type of cracking are preserved and accentuated by the infilling of the cracks with material of a different composition from that of either the clayey or calcareous sediments in which the cracks form. The infilling of the cracks by sediments of a different character often preserved the polygonal pattern of the cracking where it can be exhumed by erosion as a patterned pavement after the sediment becomes lithified into a sedimentary rock.

The final type of tessellated pavement consists of relatively flat, sandstone surfaces that typically exhibit a complex pattern of five- or six-sided polygons. Typically, these polygons vary greatly in size from 0.5 to 2 m in width. These polygons are defined by well-developed fractures that sometimes have raised rims. They are found within exposures of the Hawkesbury Sandstone within the Sydney, New South Wales, Australia region, exposures of the Precipice Sandstone at the Kenniff Cave Archaeological Site in Queensland, Australia, and in exposures of Upper Cretaceous sandstones of the Boulder, Colorado, U.S., region. The origin of this type of tessellated pavement remains uncertain. The size and shape of these polygons appears to be dependent to a large extent on the grain size, texture, and coherence of the rock. This polygonal tessellation is best developed in relatively fine-grained, uniform, and siliceous or silicified sandstones.

== Tessellated Pavement, Eaglehawk Neck, Tasmania ==
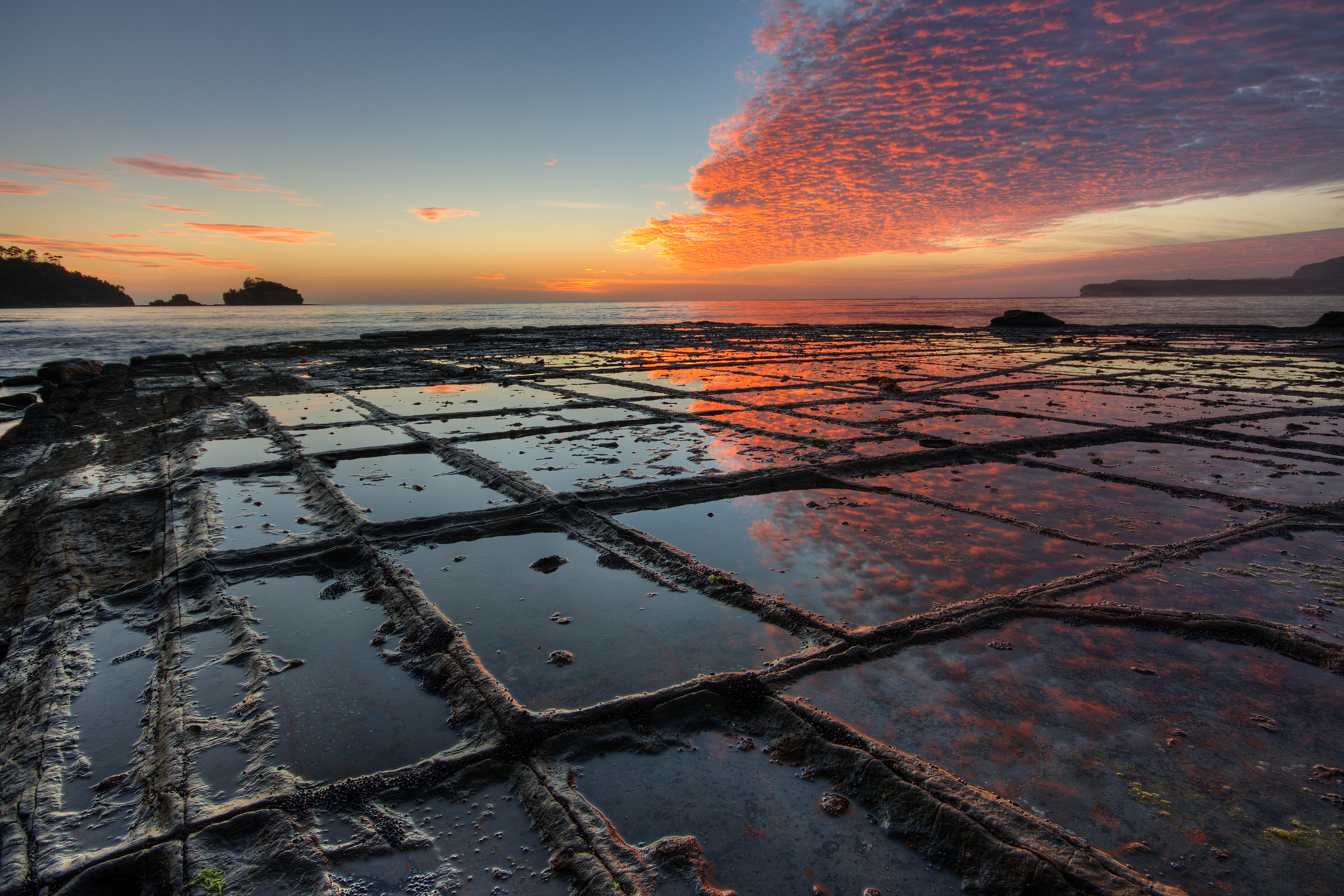
Sunrise on the tessellated pavement at Eaglehawk Neck, Tasmania, illustrating the pan formation of tessellation

The most well known example of a tessellated pavement is the Tessellated Pavement that is found at Lufra, Eaglehawk Neck on the Tasman Peninsula of Tasmania. This tessellated pavement consists of a marine platform on the shore of Pirates Bay, Tasmania. This example consists of two types of formations: a pan formation and a loaf formation.

The pan formation is a series of concave depressions in the rock that typically forms beyond the edge of the seashore. This part of the pavement dries out more at low tide than the portion abutting the seashore, allowing salt crystals to develop further; the surface of the "pans" therefore erodes more quickly than the joints, resulting in increasing concavity.

The loaf formations occur on the parts of the pavement closer to the seashore, which are immersed in water for longer periods of time. These parts of the pavement do not dry out so much, reducing the level of salt crystallisation. Water, carrying abrasive sand, is typically channelled through the joints, causing them to erode faster than the rest of the pavement, leaving loaf-like structures protruding.

== See also ==
- Giant's Causeway
