= Dart Island =

Island in Tasmania, Australia

- Location within Tasmania

Geography
- Location: Norfolk Bay
- Coordinates: 43°01′34″S 147°51′00″E
- Archipelago: Tasman Island Group

Administration
- Australia
- State: Tasmania

Additional information
- Time zone: AEST (UTC+10)
  - Summer (DST): AEDT (UTC+11)

Dart Island, part of the Tasman Island Group, lies close to the south-eastern coast of Tasmania, Australia. It is located in Norfolk Bay, situated off the Tasman Peninsula.

Dart Island is a state reserve. If contains stands of blackwoods, allocasuarinas and eucalypts. Rabbits are present and cause browsing damage to the vegetation.

== See also ==
- List of islands of Tasmania
