= Tasman Island Lighthouse =

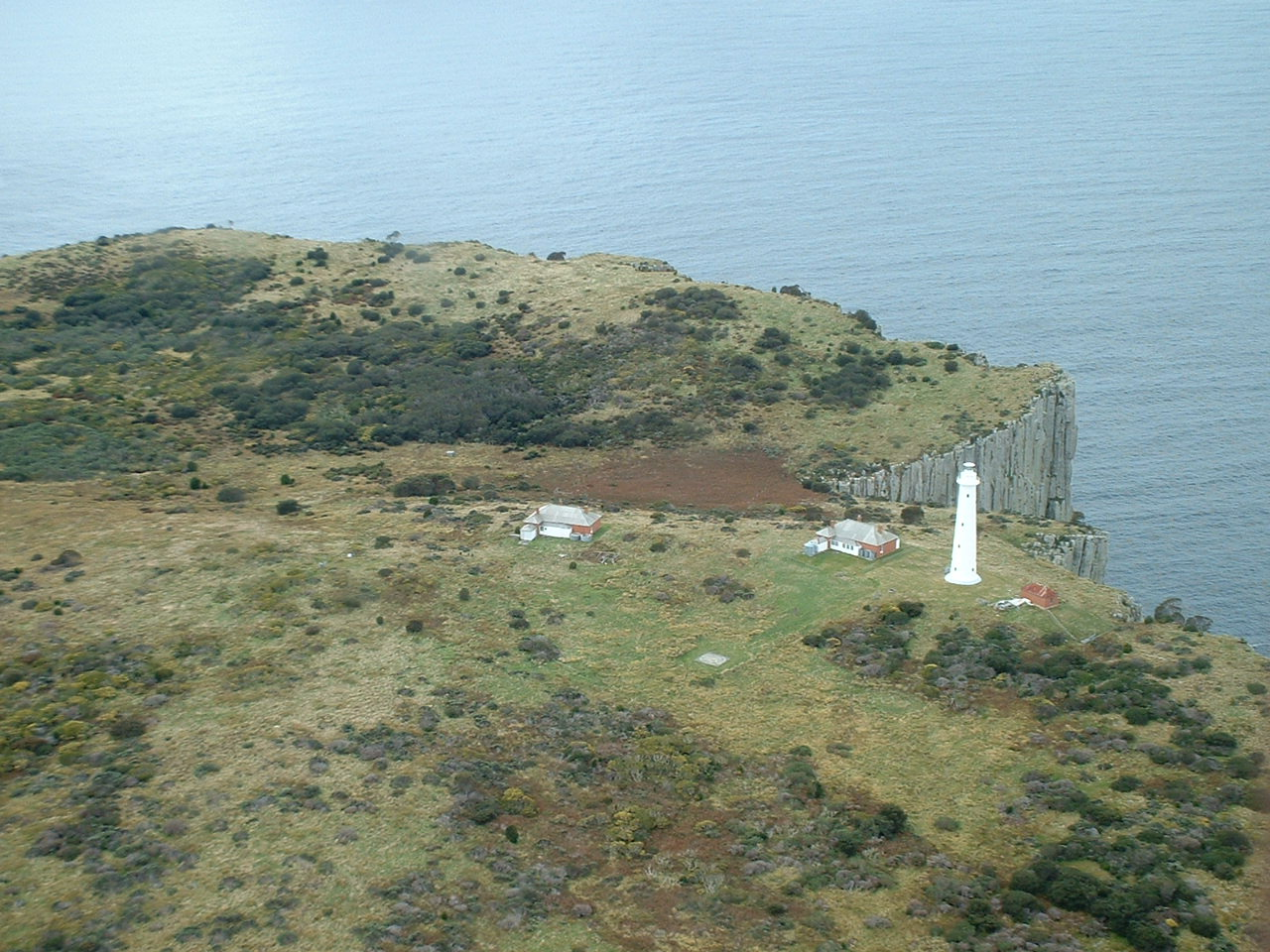
- Tasman Island Lighthouse
- Location: Tasman Island south-eastern Tasmania; Australia
- Coordinates: 43°14′22.1″S 148°00′18.3″E

Tower
- Constructed: 1906
- Construction: cast iron segments
- Automated: 1976
- Height: 29 metres (95 ft)
- Shape: tapered cylindrical tower with double balcony and lantern
- Markings: white tower and lantern
- Power source: solar power
- Operator: Australian Maritime Safety Authority
- Heritage: listed on the Tasmanian Heritage Register

Light
- Focal height: 276 metres (906 ft)
- Intensity: 63,000 cd
- Range: 39 nautical miles (72 km; 45 mi)
- Characteristic: Fl W 7.5s.

The Tasman Island Lighthouse, on Tasman Island off the coast of southeastern Tasmania, Australia, was one of the most isolated lighthouses in Australia. It was first lit on 2 April 1906, automated in 1976 and demanned in 1977. Solar conversion occurred in 1991. Various light sources have been fitted to the lighthouse since low voltage solar was installed in 1991. The current light source is a Vega VRB25. It has a character of Flashing 7.5x - Flash 0.1s - Eclipse 7.4s and produces 63,000 candelas with a geographical range of 39 nautical miles and a nominal range of 18 nautical miles.

At a special meeting of the Hobart Marine Board on 6 April 1904, it was announced that a lighthouse was to be built on Tasman Island.

The successful tenderer was Henrikson & Knutson for a price of £10,487 (1904) (equivalent to £1.46 million or US$1.86 million in 2024) with an undertaking to complete the works in 18 months from the date of announcement being 18 August 1904. This company had previously built the Denison Canal near Dunalley.

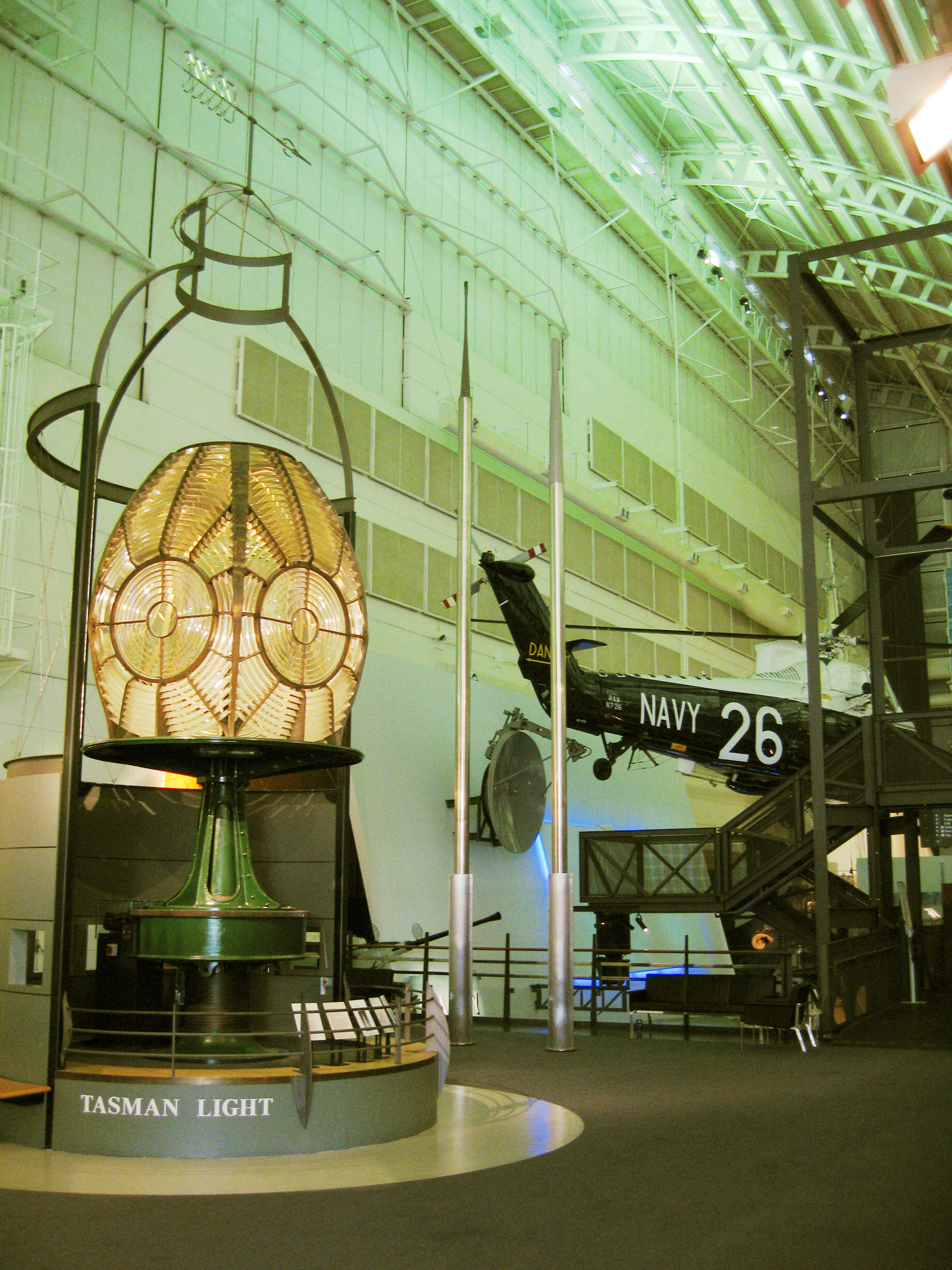
The original lens for the Tasman Island Lighthouse on display at the Australian National Maritime Museum

The components of the cast iron lighthouse were prefabricated in England and hauled piece by piece up the 250-metre-high (820 ft) cliffs in height before assembly. The island is now part of the Tasman National Park. The lighthouse and associated structures, such as the keepers’ cottages, are listed on Australia's Register of the National Estate. The original first-order Fresnel lens by Chance Brothers can be seen on display at the Australian National Maritime Museum in Sydney, the original lantern is on loan to the Friends of Tasman Island and currently in storage in Hobart.

Either annually or biennially the lighthouse and island are open for public access via helicopter tours. These trips are organised by the Rotary Club of the Tasman Peninsula.

Tasman Island lighthouse and surrounding land is owned by the Tasmanian State government. The Australian Maritime Safety Authority (AMSA) lease the lighthouse and land from the Tasmania Parks & Wildlife Service. The AMSA lease consists of one parcel of land totaling 2,456 square metres (26,440 ft^{2}). Within this lease are the lighthouse, solar array and helipad.

The current lease was signed on 1 May 1998 for a period of 25 years. This lease has an option for extension for a further 25 years.

== See also ==
- History of Tasmania
- List of lighthouses in Tasmania
