= A Very Loud Death =

US musical group

- From left to right: Bryan Peel, Cole O'Neil Robertson, Chris Edge

Background information
- Origin: Atlanta, GA, U.S.
- Genres: Post-grunge; post-rock; post-punk; noise rock; art rock; progressive rock
- Years active: 2015–present
- Labels: Unsigned, DIY
- Spinoff of: SIN
- Members: Chris Edge; Bryan Peel; Cole O'Neil Robertson
- Past members: Kevin Guthrie; Addison Kirkland
- Website: www.averylouddeath.com

A Very Loud Death (sometimes abbreviated as AVLD) is a three-piece American rock band formed in 2015, in Atlanta, Georgia, United States. The band consists of founding members Chris Edge (guitar, vocals), Bryan Peel (bass, effects, backing vocals), and recent member Cole O'Neil Robertson (drums, percussion).

Formed after the end of Chris' and Bryan's previous band, SIN, A Very Loud Death developed a style of conceptual, story telling post-alternative, noise rock music which uses a variety of influences such as jazz, grunge, classical, heavy rock, pop vocals, post-rock, progressive-rock, post-punk, jam band, traditional, and ambient music.

== History ==
=== 2015–2016: Do Away and Luke Campolieta ===
The band auditioned several drummers before finding gospel drummer Addison Kirkland. They were then, by chance, contacted via email by Patchwerk Studios sound engineer, Luke Campolieta. After hearing one of the home recording demos of the band on SoundCloud, he offered to record the band for free.

The band took him up on the offer. Luke pushed the band to record based on feeling, wanting to capture the "perfect performance, the right energy," which led to a very "dark place and sound- honestly, a more honest and real direction".

Following the recording, the band released the single in a limited, digital-only format.

=== 2016: The Castration of the Idiot/The Addition of Cole O'Neil Robertson ===
After Do Away and wanting to explore a new direction- the band decided on a concept album vastly different from the dark sound of "their first single". Over the next few months they decided to again work with Luke Campolieta. Having most of an EP already written, and with studio time booked, Addison left the band due to scheduling. The band auditioned several drummers, before deciding on Cole Robertson.

Borrowing from Dostoyevsky's "The Idiot" the band wrote the EP, using post-punk, surfer, noise, doo-wop, and honky tonk, the 6 song EP marked a drastic foray into new territories for the band.

Praised for its "brooding, controlling menace" the album launched two singles, "Mary" and "The Fleers" with both being the first of the band's music to appear on the radio.

=== 2017: Lanterns ===
After "The Castration of the Idiot," the band decided to take some time off to develop their chemistry. During this time they wrote new material which formed into what would be their debut full-length album, "Lanterns".

Working for the third time with Luke Campolieta, the band released the first single, the self-titled track "Lanterns" on April 25, as a digital only release. They then announced the full album, "Lanterns", which was released on September 19, 2017.

The album received generally positive reviews and international recognition. With UK's Lone Frequencies calling it a "Glorious Album". Riff Relevant called the album "...as haunting as it is beautiful."

=== 2018–present: Lurching in the Dark | Ulimatique ===
Only July 1, 2018 the band released the first single "Lurching in the Dark". They followed this, releasing their final EP, which in December of the same year. The album includes "Lurching In The Dark," as well as the tracks "Lingchi," "Computations," "Zoetrope," "Circuitous," and their swan-song "Recover."

== Musical style ==
Described as post-alternative, post-punk, surfer, alternative-metal, and hard rock, A Very Loud Death often mixes pop arrangements with art-rock, progressive rock, grunge, stoner rock, minimalism, r&b, proto-punk, and post-industrial noise. In 2017, Chris Edge described A Very Loud Death as "just a live instrument band really, that likes to make visual music, tell a story, and give a vibe by whatever means necessary." Cole O'Neil Robertson said: "we're about serving the song first and foremost. Whatever that song may be."

== Members ==
=== Current members ===
- Bryan Peel – Bass, Effects, Backing Vocals
- Chris Edge – Vocals, Guitar, Keyboard, Backing Vocals
- Cole O'Neil Robertson – Drums, Percussion

== Discography ==
=== Studio albums ===
- The Castration of the Idiot (EP) (2016)
- Lanterns (2017)
- Ulimatique (2020)
