= Lanterns (A Very Loud Death album) =

2017 album

Studio album by A Very Loud Death
- Released: 19 September 2017
- Recorded: April – August 2017
- Studio: The Ministry LLC (Atlanta, Georgia)
- Genre: Alternative rock; noise rock; hard rock; art rock
- Length: 43:00
- Label: Unsigned; DIY
- Producer: Luke Campolieta; A Very Loud Death

A Very Loud Death chronology
The Castration of the Idiot (2016)	Lanterns (2017)

Singles from Lanterns
- 1. "Lanterns" Released: 25 April 2017; 2. "Circus Mind" Released: 25 August 2017

Lanterns is the debut, full-length album of American rock band A Very Loud Death, released independently by the group on September 19, 2017. Recorded between April 1, 2017 and August 21, 2017 at The Ministry of Sound in Atlanta, Georgia, the album was engineered by Luke Campolieta and produced by both Luke and the band.

== Background and recording ==
Following the release of their EP, The Castration of the Idiot, A Very Loud Death took a 7-month break to develop chemistry with their new drummer, Cole O'Neil Robertson. At that time, Chris Edge and Bryan Peel already had half of the album written as well as about 20 other songs, with the tracks for Lanterns selected because they were "darker and heavier and more fitting of the art direction at the time".

According to Edge, it wasn't until the track, "The Wild", had been written with Cole that the band found a direction and concept for the album and were able to finish writing the second half of the album. They approached Luke Campolieta at one of their concerts in November 2016 about doing a possible full length. Two months later they finalized a date and began pre-production.

While all of the tracks went through pre-production, with Edge writing the lyrics and the band formulating the arrangements and overall direction, any songs with lead melodies, harmonies, backing vocals, effects, noise, and any post-production were written in the studio, often on the fly utilizing free jazz, noise rock, jam band, industrial, narrative, and experimental techniques.

== Critical reception ==
The album has received generally favorable reviews from independent music critics. On October 16, 2017 Adam Harmless of GAD! Zine said of Lanterns "This recording is a mystery...You're gonna think you've heard this before, but it's richer and more interesting. Subtlety is power."

On October 23, 2017, James Orez of Lone Frequencies called Lanterns a "Glorious album". With Jacob of Lone Frequencies saying of Lanterns "...it's very layered/textured. Not over the top, just moody music...there is a bit of beauty in the darkness of A Very Loud Death."

Pat "Riot" Whitaker, of RiffRelevant.com, gave a positive review, saying about Lanterns, "...what they are is rather cool, emotionally riveting post-metal/progressive rock...the trio provide some powerfully illuminating music...it is as haunting as it is beautiful...”

Brian Lush of RockWired Radio and Magazine, gave a favorable review stating of Lanterns, "The album is a dark, moody listen that combines primal punk energy with a more nuanced, progressive rock aesthetic. It's a sound that is sure to take the band beyond their stomping grounds and into that cherished glow of indie rock recognition, and dare we say 'fame'."

One of the more interesting reviews came from Kayla Hutton of imperfectFifth.com, who said of Lanterns "The best way to describe A Very Loud Death's latest offering is that there is enough dramatic loudness to wake up empathy in a stone-cold psychopath."

On July 10, 2018 Andrew Duncan of Selective Memory Mag said "...The bottom line is that Lanterns is a great album. So, how do you top that?"

== Track listing ==
All tracks are written by A Very Loud Death.

No.	Title	Length
1.	"Consumer"	5:46
2.	"Temples"	3:02
3.	"Lanterns"	2:40
4.	"Gluttony"	3:44
5.	"The Ease of Absurdity"	4:46
6.	"Deserts"	4:17
7.	"The Wild"	5:02
8.	"Circus Mind"	5:20
9.	"Daughters of Melpomene"	3:45
10.	"Still Life: Cactus in a Cage"	6:15
