= Tasman Island =

Island in Tasmania, Australia

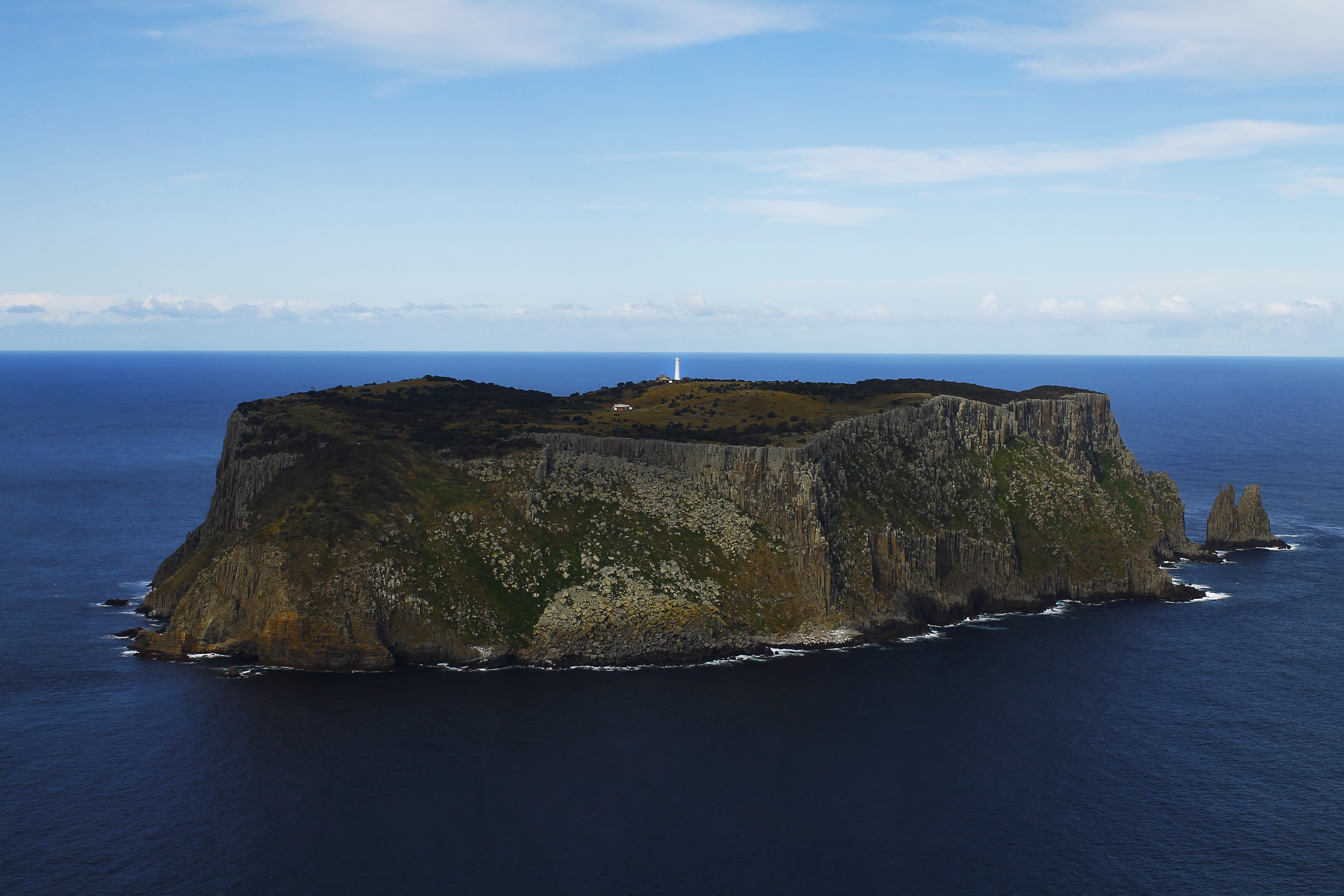
- Tasman Island From Cape Pillar c. 2018

- Location within Tasmania
- Etymology: Abel Tasman

Geography
- Location: Tasman Sea
- Coordinates: 43°14′15″S 148°00′10″E
- Archipelago: Tasman Island Group
- Area: 1.2 km^{2} (0.46 sq mi)

Administration
- Australia
- State: Tasmania

Additional information
- Time zone: AEST (UTC+10)
  - Summer (DST): AEDT (UTC+11)

The Tasman Island, part of the Tasman Island Group, is an oval island with an area of 1.2 square kilometres (0.46 sq mi), lying close to the south-eastern coast of Tasmania, Australia. The island is located in the Tasman Sea, situated off the Tasman Peninsula and is contained within the Tasman National Park.

The island is a plateau surrounded by steep dolerite cliffs, with its highest point near 250 metres (820 ft) above sea level (asl) and an average plateau height of 200 to 240 metres (660 to 790 ft) asl Tasmanian government list maps . The altitude and topography of the island is often incorrectly stated, which may be related to the common reference to the light on the lighthouse, which sits at approximately 280 metres (920 ft) asl.

It is the site of the Tasman Island Lighthouse and weather station, which has been automated since 1976 and unstaffed since 1977. The weather station sits near the light house.

== Flora and fauna ==
=== Plants ===
The island was once thickly forested. The forest has largely disappeared as a result of cutting the trees for firewood and of intense fires. When the lighthouse was staffed, the keepers kept livestock, including cattle, sheep and draught horses, and maintained grassland for their grazing. Areas of grassland remain along with other vegetation communities of heathy scrub, regenerating scrub, sheoak woodland, sedgeland and coastal mosaic. An important plant present is the rare Cape Pillar sheoak (Allocasuarina crassa).

=== Birds ===
Tasman Island is a very important breeding site for fairy prions, with an estimated 300,000-700,000 pairs, making it the largest such colony in Tasmania and possibly in Australia. It has been identified as an Important Bird Area (IBA) by BirdLife International because it supports over 1% of the world population of the species. Other recorded breeding seabird species are little penguin (now extinct there as a breeding species), short-tailed shearwater and sooty shearwater. The swamp harrier has also bred on the island.

The breeding seabirds were preyed on by a feral cat population estimated at 50, feeding mainly on fairy prions and taking about 50,000 birds annually. The cats were eradicated by a baiting, trapping, and hunting program carried out in May 2010.

=== Other animals ===
Australian and New Zealand fur seals use the rocky shore as a haul-out site, and the latter species has bred there in small numbers. Humpback whales pass through the surrounding waters. Reptiles recorded from the island include the metallic skink, White's skink, spotted skink and she-oak skink. A notable invertebrate, so far recorded only from Tasman Island, is the cricket Tasmanoplectron isolatum.

== Climate ==
Climate data for Tasman Island Lighthouse
Month	Jan	Feb	Mar	Apr	May	Jun	Jul	Aug	Sep	Oct	Nov	Dec	Year
Record high °C (°F)	30.5 (86.9)	36.1 (97.0)	29.4 (84.9)	27.8 (82.0)	21.6 (70.9)	19.4 (66.9)	18.5 (65.3)	17.7 (63.9)	24.3 (75.7)	23.3 (73.9)	32.8 (91.0)	29.5 (85.1)	36.1 (97.0)
Mean daily maximum °C (°F)	16.4 (61.5)	17.6 (63.7)	16.4 (61.5)	14.7 (58.5)	12.4 (54.3)	10.7 (51.3)	10.2 (50.4)	10.2 (50.4)	11.4 (52.5)	12.6 (54.7)	13.3 (55.9)	15.1 (59.2)	13.4 (56.1)
Mean daily minimum °C (°F)	10.3 (50.5)	11.4 (52.5)	10.8 (51.4)	9.4 (48.9)	7.7 (45.9)	6.6 (43.9)	5.8 (42.4)	5.7 (42.3)	6.2 (43.2)	6.8 (44.2)	7.8 (46.0)	9.0 (48.2)	8.1 (46.6)
Record low °C (°F)	4.0 (39.2)	4.0 (39.2)	1.1 (34.0)	0.0 (32.0)	1.7 (35.1)	−1.1 (30.0)	−1.1 (30.0)	0.0 (32.0)	−1.1 (30.0)	0.0 (32.0)	1.6 (34.9)	1.0 (33.8)	−1.1 (30.0)
Average precipitation mm (inches)	64.3 (2.53)	66.7 (2.63)	68.0 (2.68)	75.2 (2.96)	86.4 (3.40)	87.1 (3.43)	84.8 (3.34)	80.7 (3.18)	59.2 (2.33)	80.5 (3.17)	71.9 (2.83)	85.7 (3.37)	909.9 (35.82)
Average precipitation days	13.7	12.8	14.6	17.1	18.6	18.9	19.7	19.6	18.0	18.7	17.7	16.1	205.5
Source: Bureau of Meteorology

Climate data for Tasman Island
Month	Jan	Feb	Mar	Apr	May	Jun	Jul	Aug	Sep	Oct	Nov	Dec	Year
Record high °C (°F)	37.7 (99.9)	35.1 (95.2)	32.8 (91.0)	28.2 (82.8)	21.6 (70.9)	17.9 (64.2)	17.0 (62.6)	19.0 (66.2)	25.2 (77.4)	30.5 (86.9)	31.7 (89.1)	33.5 (92.3)	37.7 (99.9)
Mean daily maximum °C (°F)	18.3 (64.9)	17.9 (64.2)	17.1 (62.8)	15.2 (59.4)	13.2 (55.8)	11.5 (52.7)	11.0 (51.8)	11.5 (52.7)	12.8 (55.0)	13.7 (56.7)	15.2 (59.4)	16.6 (61.9)	14.5 (58.1)
Mean daily minimum °C (°F)	11.8 (53.2)	11.9 (53.4)	11.4 (52.5)	10.0 (50.0)	8.7 (47.7)	7.5 (45.5)	6.7 (44.1)	6.6 (43.9)	7.0 (44.6)	7.7 (45.9)	9.0 (48.2)	10.3 (50.5)	9.0 (48.2)
Record low °C (°F)	5.0 (41.0)	4.2 (39.6)	4.4 (39.9)	3.3 (37.9)	1.1 (34.0)	1.2 (34.2)	0.6 (33.1)	−0.2 (31.6)	0.6 (33.1)	1.5 (34.7)	1.6 (34.9)	3.4 (38.1)	−0.2 (31.6)
Average precipitation mm (inches)	66.6 (2.62)	49.1 (1.93)	69.0 (2.72)	65.9 (2.59)	70.7 (2.78)	62.4 (2.46)	66.0 (2.60)	76.4 (3.01)	71.7 (2.82)	64.7 (2.55)	56.5 (2.22)	68.0 (2.68)	785.4 (30.92)
Average precipitation days	12.7	12.6	15.7	16.6	17.1	16.6	17.5	19.5	17.0	18.5	15.8	15.0	194.6
Source: Bureau of Meteorology

== Gallery ==
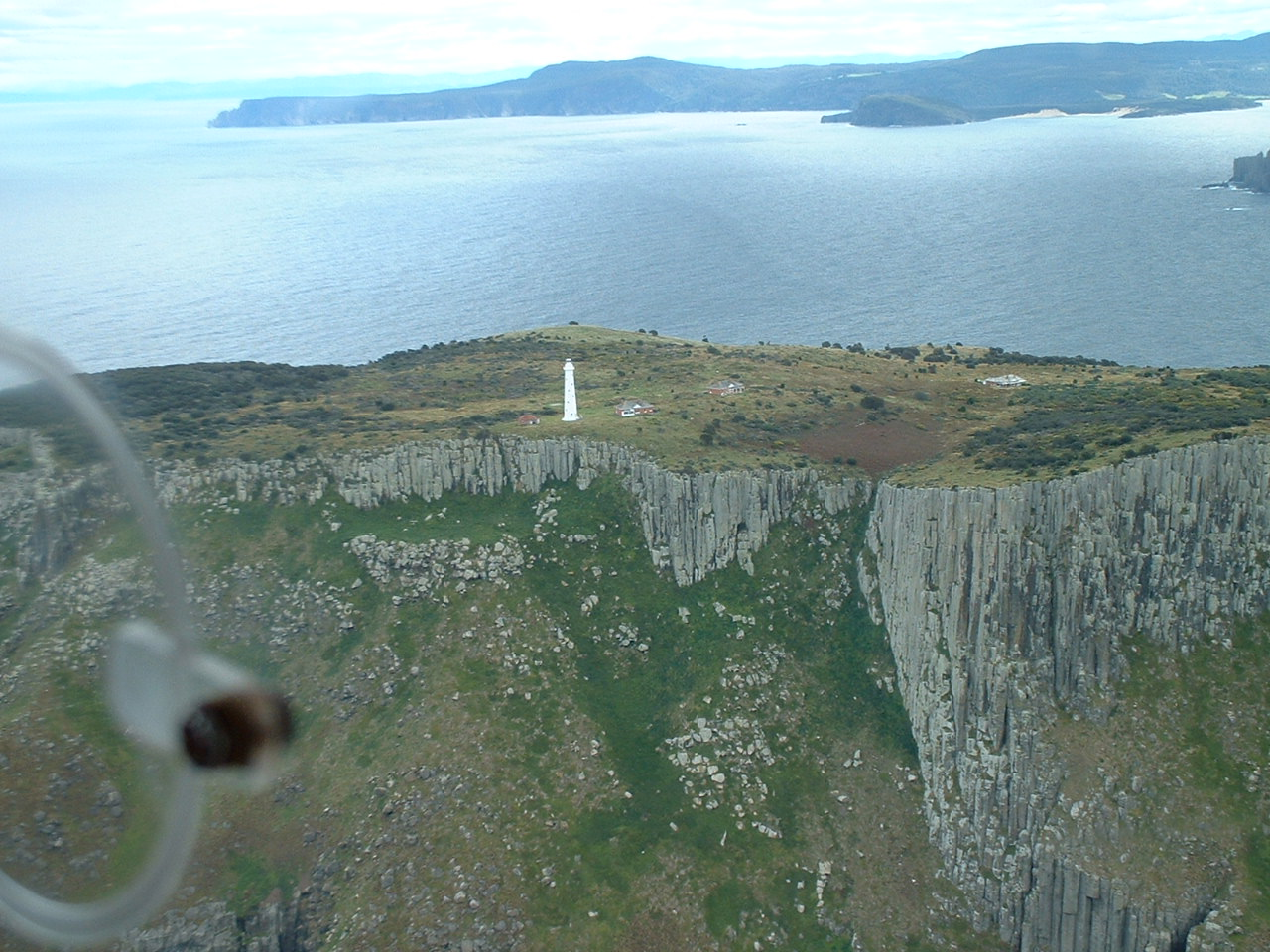
Showing lighthouse and keepers' cottages.

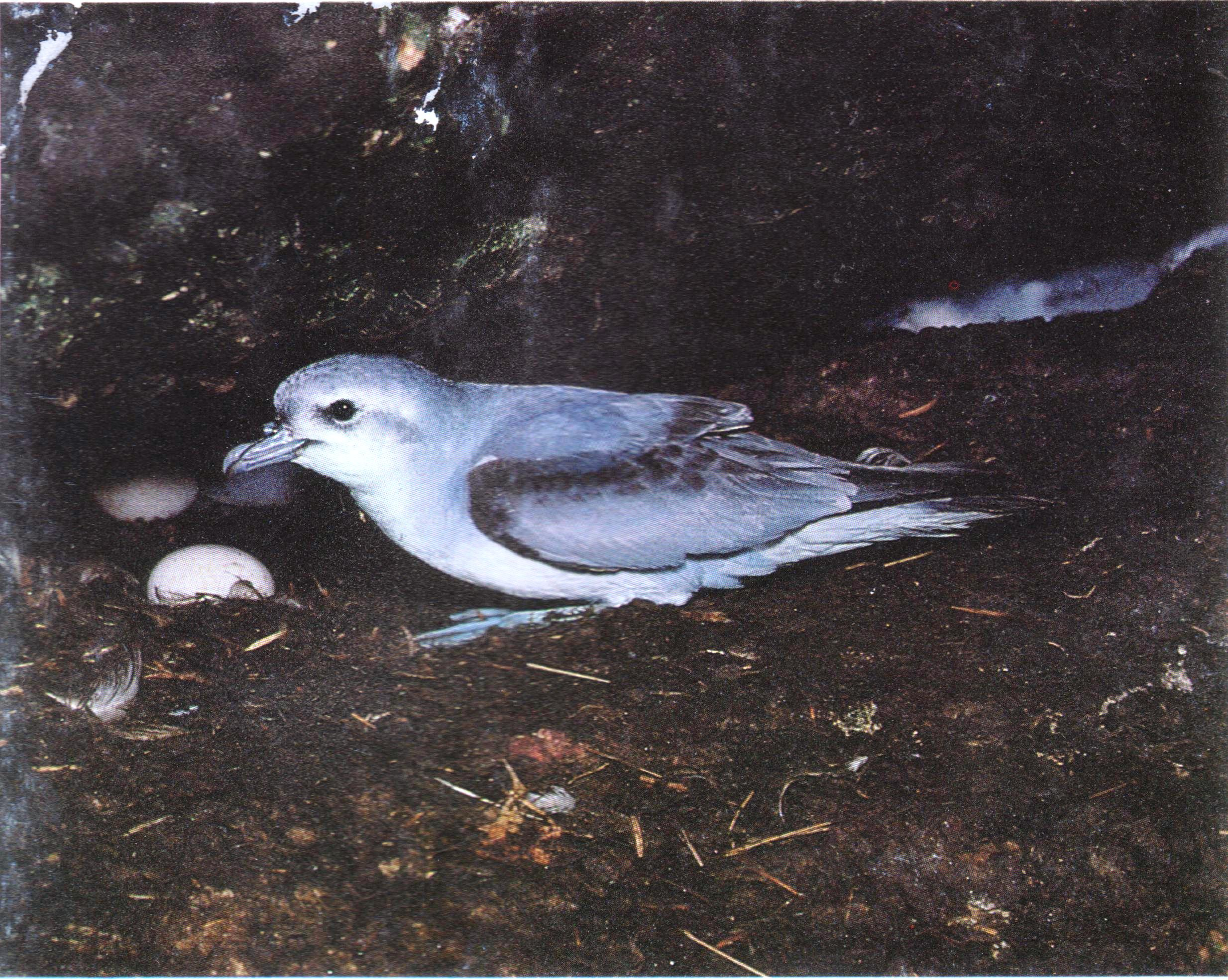
The island is a major breeding site for fairy prions.

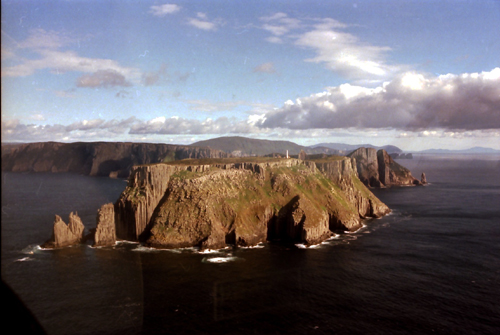
The Tasman Island with the Tasman Peninsula in the background, ca. 1987.

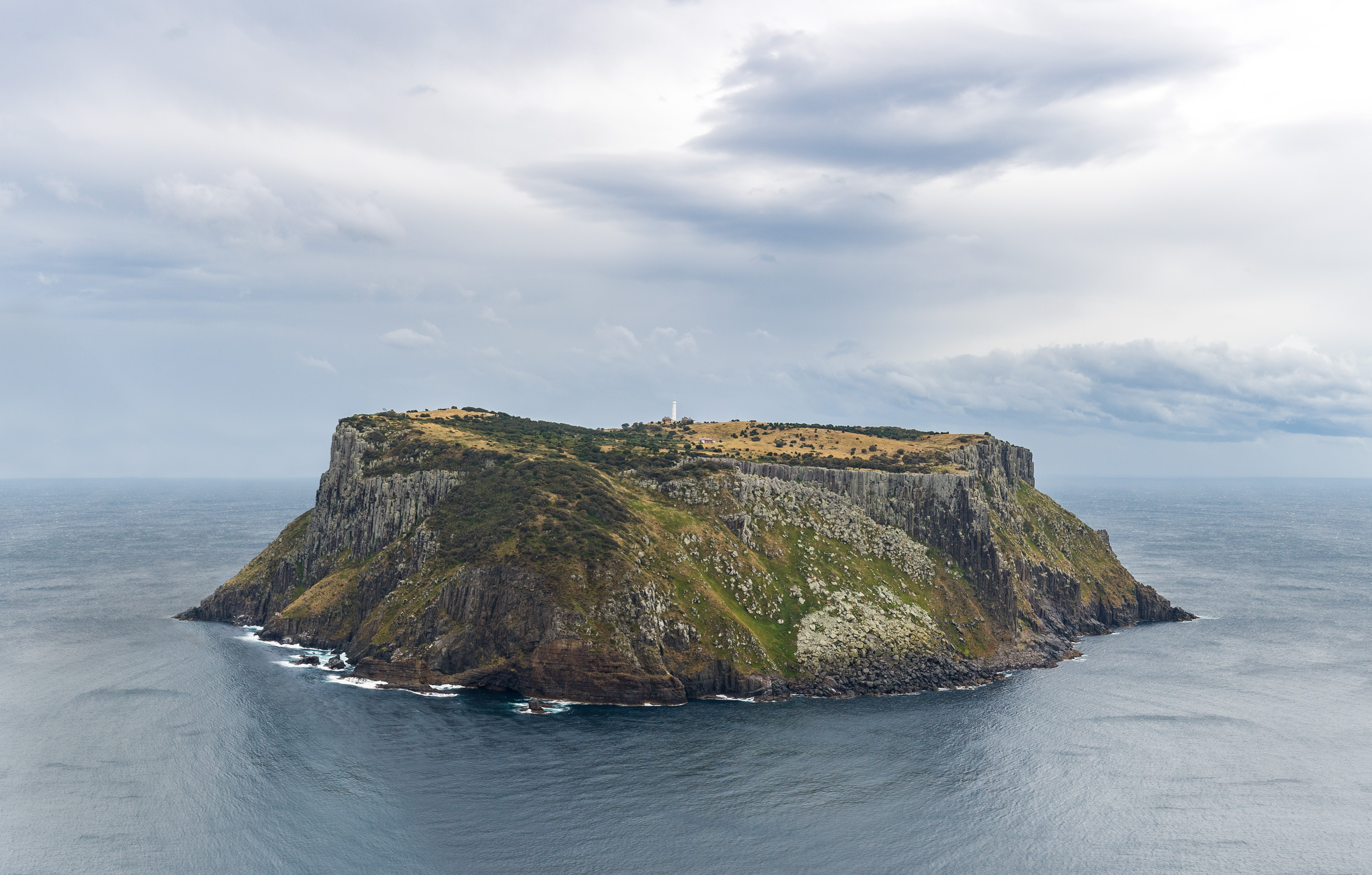
Tasman Island 2017

== See also ==
- List of islands of Tasmania
