= Fortescue Bay =

Bay in southeast Tasmania, Australia

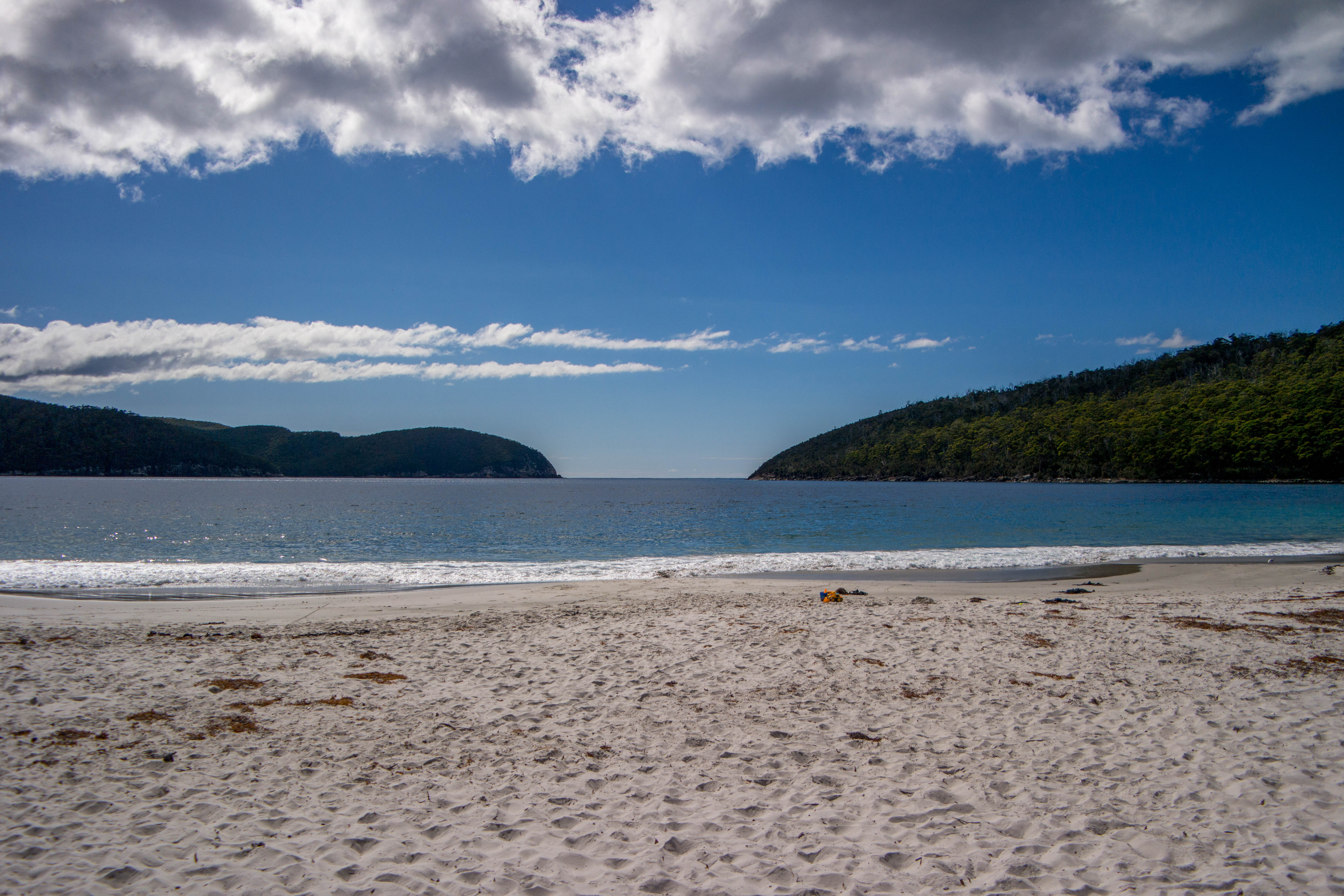
- Fortescue Bay at midday

- Location: Tasmania, Australia
- Coordinates: 43°07′50.5194″S 147°58′13.029″E
- Type: Bay
- Part of: Tasman National Park
- Ocean/sea sources: South Pacific Ocean / Tasman Sea
- Average depth: 30 m (98 ft)

Fortescue Bay or Baje Dolomien is a bay in southeast Tasmania, Australia. It is located 10 km (6.2 mi) east of Port Arthur, Tasmania, and makes up part of Tasman National Park. Within the bay are two smaller nested bays, Canoe Bay and Bivouac Bay.

== History ==
=== Timber mill ===
During the early 1900s, a timber mill was started at Fortescue Bay by G. Albury and Turner Brothers. At the beginning of the 1920s, the Gathercole Brothers company began advertising for men to work at their mill. It is possible that the Gathercole Brothers carried on operation of the mill owned by G. Albury and Turner Brothers, as they owned several mills around Port Arthur.

=== Fish works ===
Until the early 1970s, Canoe Bay played host to a fish works.

=== Shipwreck ===
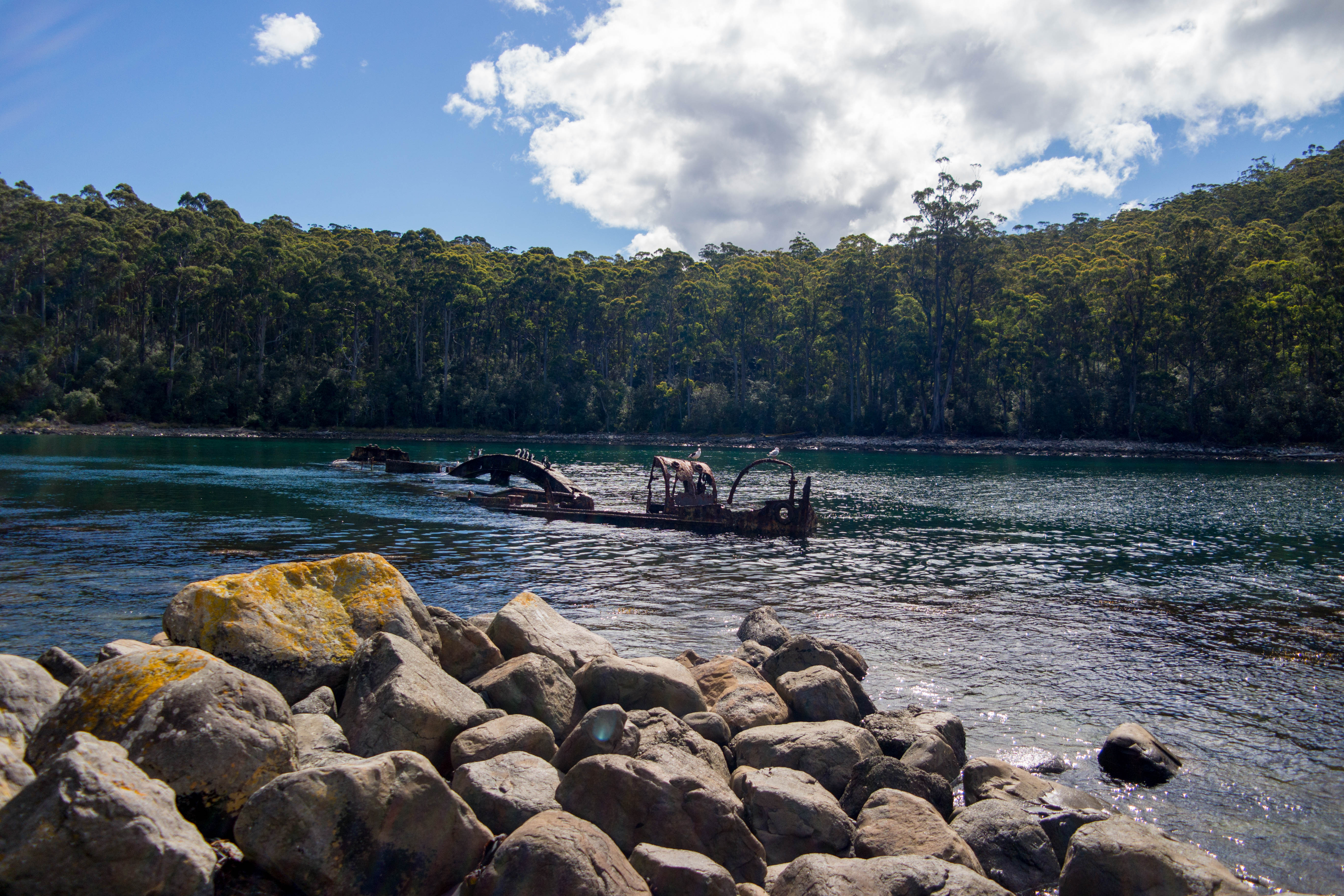
Wreck of the William Pitt Dredge

On 1 July 1953, a dredge named for William Pitt was towed from Hobart to Fortescue Bay and scuttled in the mouth of Canoe Bay at the request of the Minister for Agricultural and Sea Fisheries. The dredge was scuttled to act as a breakwater for the many fishing vessels using the area to shelter.

Before it was scuttled, the dredge was used in the construction of the Hobart Bridge and in Devonport under ownership of the Netherlands Harbour Works Company. The William Pitt spent 14 years in Tasmania, owned by the Melbourne Harbor Trust. Before its arrival to Australia in April 1907, it was known as the Andre Reboucas.

The dredge is thought to have spent time in Portugal conducting dredging operations after it launched in Bristol in 1904.

== Walks ==
Fortescue Bay has become popular among those who enjoy bush walking. Walks include:

- Canoe Bay: Starts at the northern end of the beach.
- Bivouac Bay: Continue on from Canoe Bay.
- Tasman Coastal Trail: Starts at the northern end of the beach.
- Cape Hauy: Starts near the boat ramp.
- Cape Pillar: Starts on Fortescue Road outside the camp entrance.
- Three Capes Track: Starts at the Port Arthur Historic Site
