= The Lanterns =

Island in Tasmania, Australia

- Location within Tasmania

Geography
- Location: Tasman Sea
- Coordinates: 43°08′15″S 148°00′25″E
- Archipelago: Tasman Island Group
- Area: 5.35 ha (13.2 acres)

Administration
- Australia
- State: Tasmania

Additional information
- Time zone: AEST (UTC+10)
  - Summer (DST): AEDT (UTC+11)

The Lanterns, part of the Tasman Island Group, are three small and very steep islands with a combined area of 5.35 hectares (13.2 acres), lying close to the south-eastern coast of Tasmania, Australia. The island is located in the Tasman Sea, situated off the Tasman Peninsula and is contained within the Tasman National Park.

== Fauna ==
Recorded breeding seabird species are little penguin, short-tailed shearwater and fairy prion. The peregrine falcon has also bred there.

== See also ==
- List of islands of Tasmania
