= Tasman National Park =

National park in Tasmania, Australia

- IUCN category II (national park)
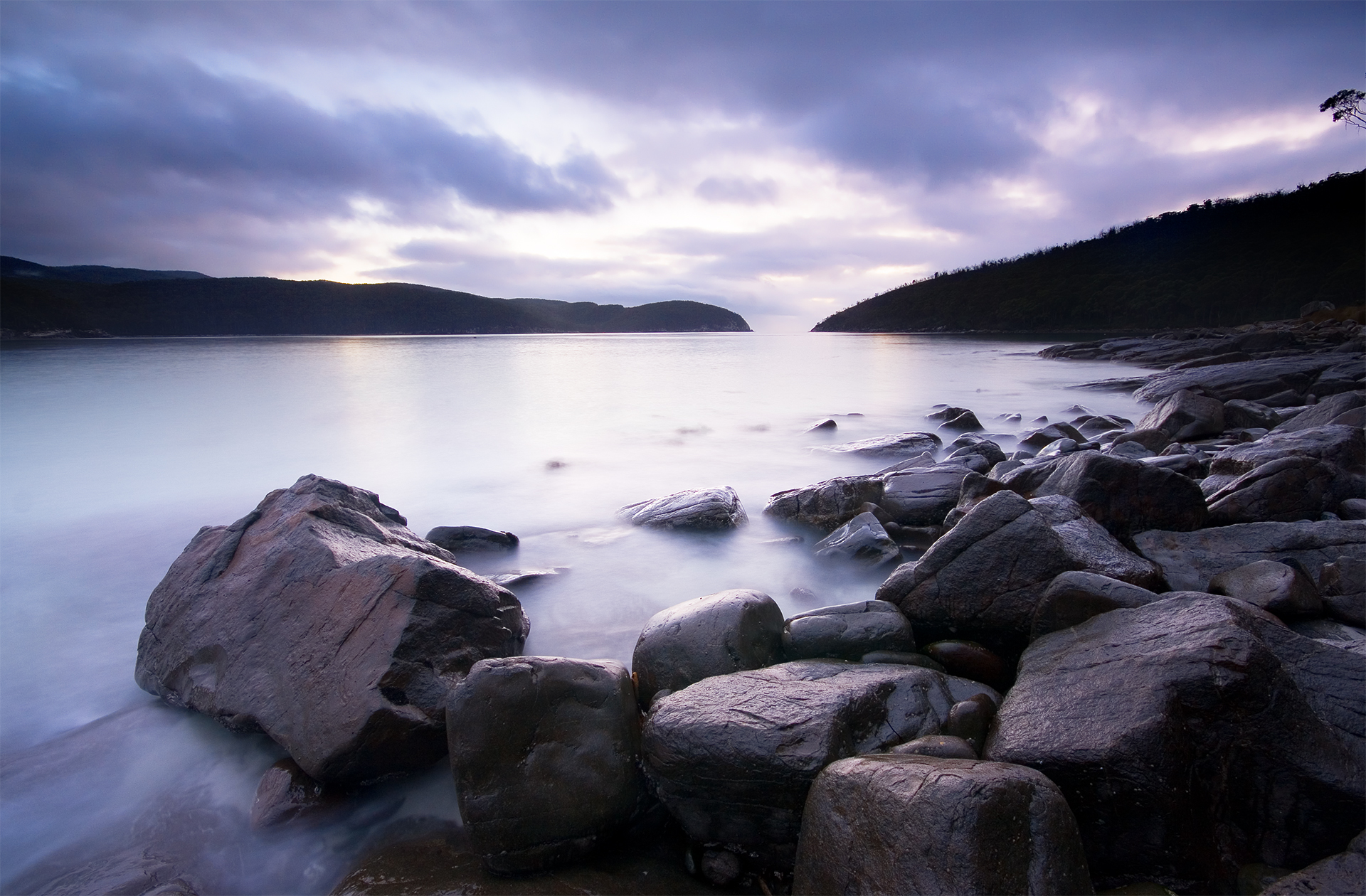
- Sunrise at Fortescue Bay

- Location within Tasmania
- Interactive map of Tasman National Park
- Location: Tasmania
- Nearest city: Port Arthur
- Coordinates: 42°51′19″S 147°58′33″E
- Area: 107.5 km^{2} (41.5 sq mi)
- Established: 30 April 1999
- Governing body: Tasmania Parks and Wildlife Service
- Website: Official website

The Tasman National Park is a national park in eastern Tasmania, Australia, approximately 56 kilometres (35 mi) east of Hobart. The 107.5-square-kilometre (41.5 sq mi) park is situated on part of both the Forestier and Tasman peninsulas and encompasses all of Tasman Island.

== History ==
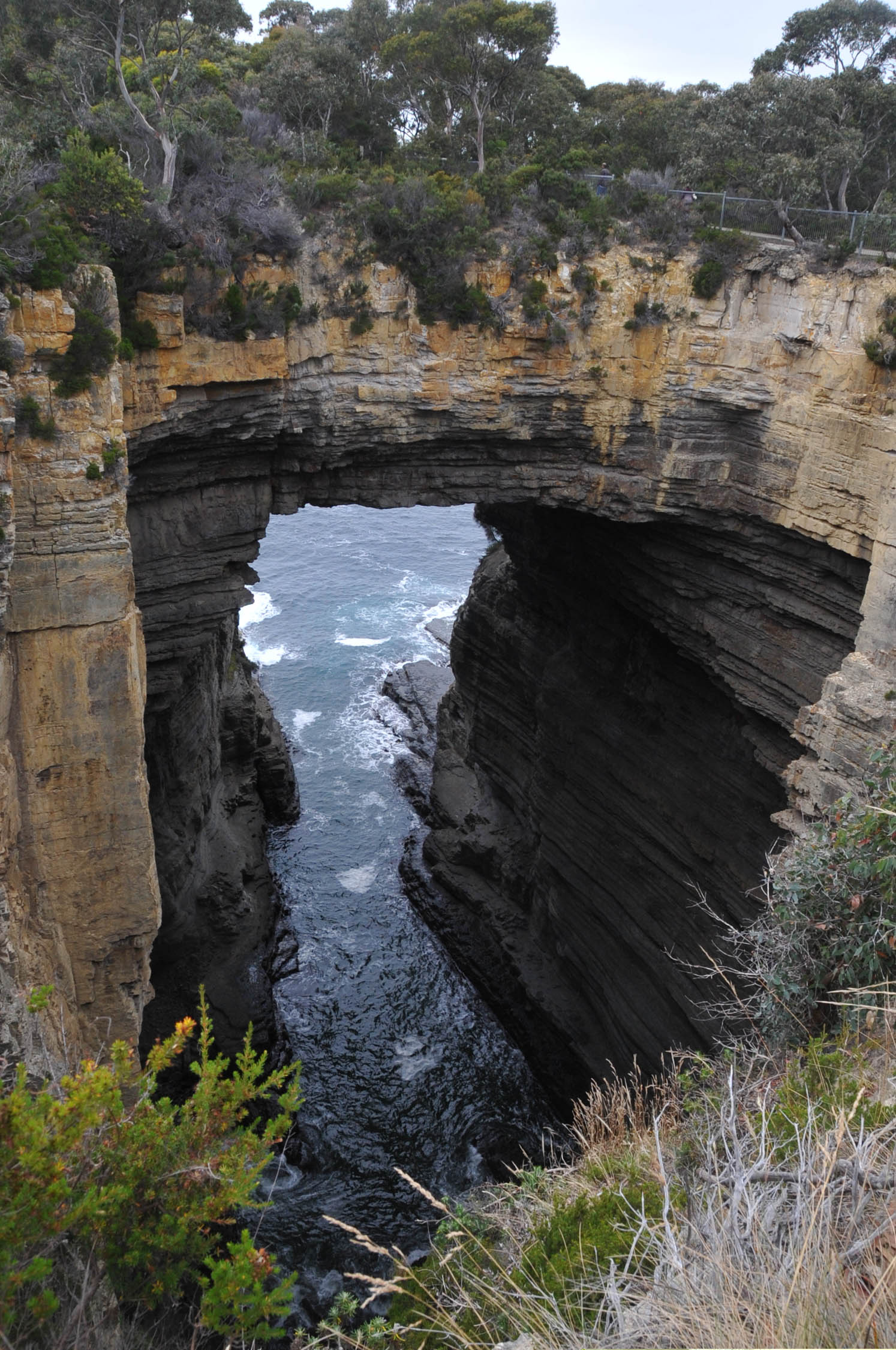
Tasman Arch and littoral chasm, Tasman National Park.

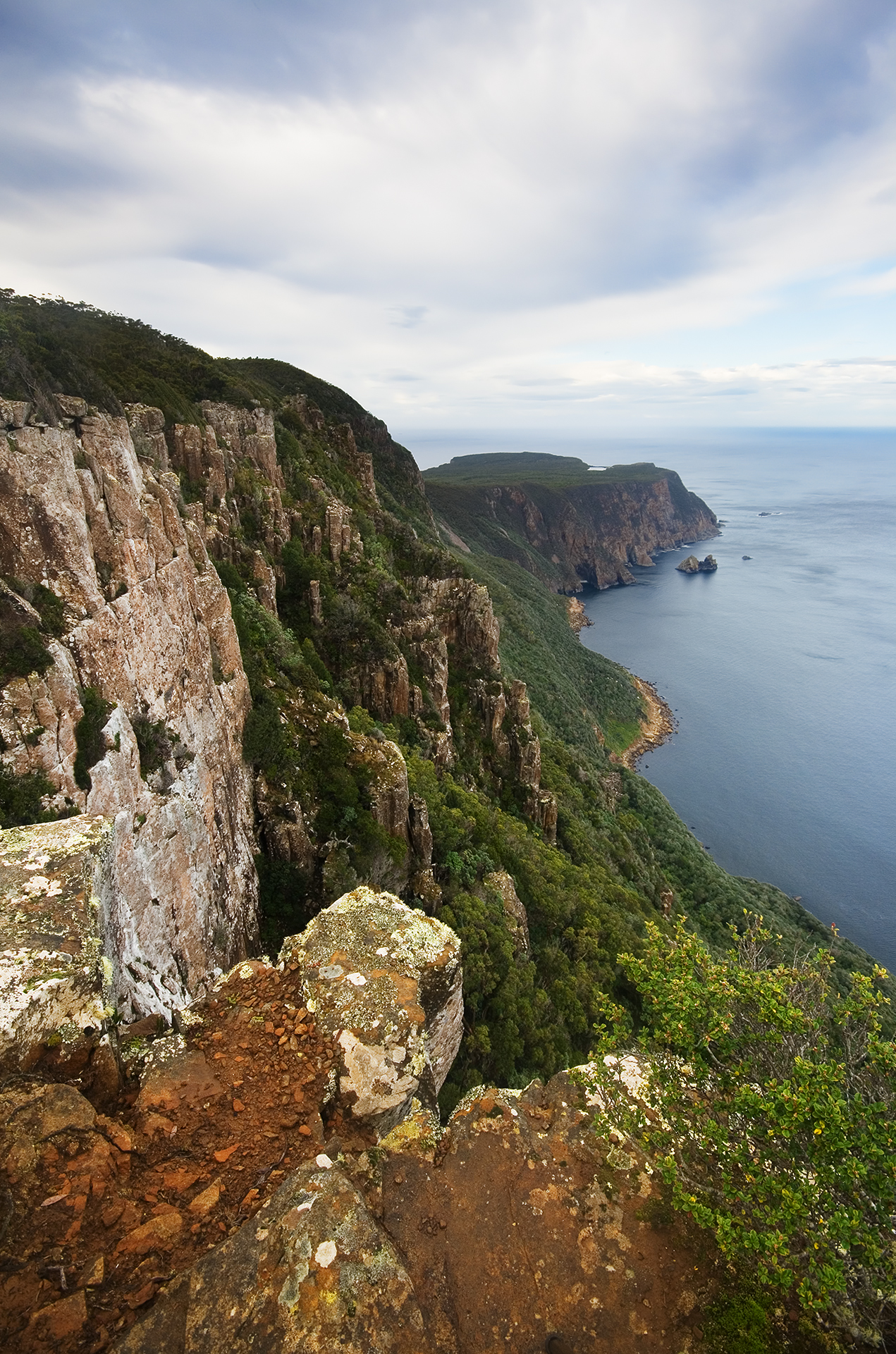
View of Cape Raoul from a lookout.

Whaling activity took place in the 1830s and 1840s.

The prominent cliffs with dolerite columns at Cape Raoul were damaged by gunnery practice by warships of the Royal Navy's Australia Station in the late 1800s.

The park was proclaimed under the Regional Forest Agreement on 30 April 1999. The Tasman Island Lighthouse (constructed in 1906) is located on Tasman Island, which is part of the park. This lighthouse and weather station has been unmanned since 1977.

== Geography ==
At 300 metres (980 ft) above sea level, the columnar dolerite cliffs at Cape Pillar and Tasman Island are among the highest in the world. Dolerite is a rare rock type on mainland Australia. Land formations accessible by road include the Blowhole (a hole at the inland end of a sea cave), Devils Kitchen (a rock hole) and Waterfall Bay. Dolerite formations which are more easily viewed from the ocean include Cathedral Rock, Totem Pole, Candlestick, and Tasmans Arch. The park includes The Lanterns, three small islands.

== Flora ==
Three species of Euphrasia (a semi-parasitic, herbaceous flowering plant commonly known as eyebright) are found only in Tasman National Park. The rare Cape Pillar Sheoak is a shrub or small tree found only in the Tasman National Park where it is restricted to the Cape Pillar area of the Tasman Peninsula and to Tasman Island.

Giant Kelp is locally extinct in Eaglehawk Neck since 2016 due to climate change, with Tasmania's remaining giant kelp forests predicted to disappear in the next five to ten years.

== Fauna ==
Australian fur seals use the coastline for breeding and resting, and little penguins (sometimes referred to as "blue penguins" or "fairy penguins") nest along the foreshore.

The park forms part of the South-east Tasmania Important Bird Area, identified as such by BirdLife International because of its importance in the conservation of a range of woodland birds, especially the endangered swift parrot and forty-spotted pardalote.

== Three Capes track ==
The Three Capes Track is a one-way 46 km 3 night track in Tasman National Park opened on 21 December 2015. It starts at Port Arthur Historic Sites and ends at Fortescue Bay with a bus taking the walkers back to Port Arthur Historic Sites. The walkers arrive at the jetty at Port Arthur Historic Sites, are taken by boat around the bay of Port Arthur then left at Denmans Cove. From there they trek 46 km to Fortescue Bay over 3 nights, stopping each night at a hut that provides water, gas top cookers, toilets and sleeping. Each hut has one Tasmanian Parks and Wildlife Ranger as well as a roving ranger who goes between huts. The huts can accommodate 48 people per night and as of December 2016 has had 8000 participants. The 4 day walk goes to Cape Pillar, Cape Hauy, Mount Fortescue, Arthurs Peak, Ellarwey Valley and ends at Fortescue Bay. The total cost was 25 million AUD including 18000 helicopter flights to the site. Before the new track was created there was already an older and not maintained track that was first created in 1990, with the Three Capes Track first being attempted to be made in the mid to late 1960s' by members of the Hobart Walkers Club.

== See also ==
- Protected areas of Tasmania
