= Clydes Island =

Island in Tasmania, Australia

Coordinates: 43°00′S 147°56′E

Clydes Island is an island in south-eastern Australia. It is part of the Tasman Island Group, lying close to the south-eastern coast of Tasmania around the Tasman Peninsula, and is easily accessible from mainland Tasmania.
