= 2013 Tasmanian bushfires =

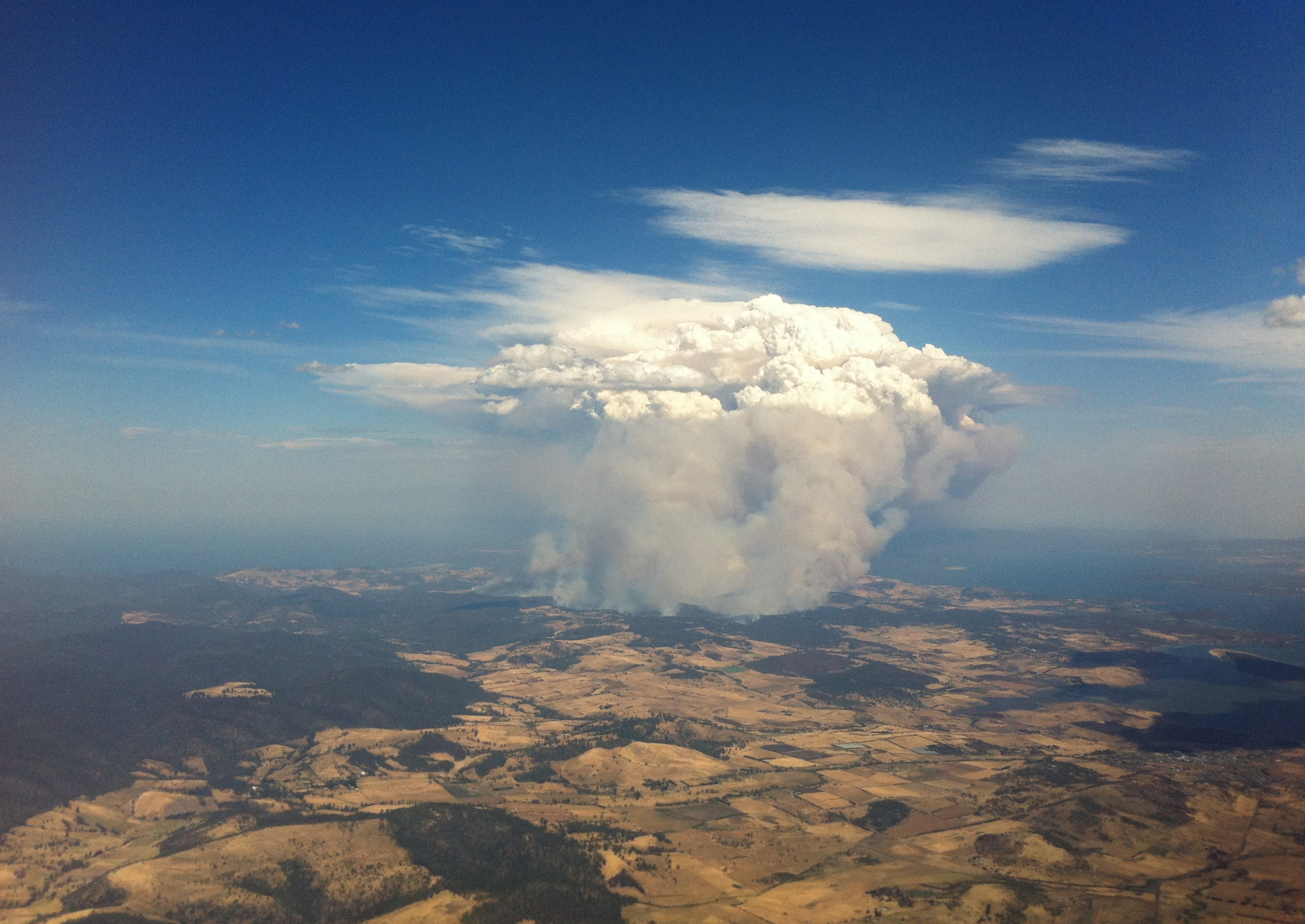
- Fires at Forcett/Copping on 4 January
- Date: January 2013
- Location: Central Highlands, East coast (Bicheno, Tasman Peninsula), Tasmania, Australia
- Coordinates: 41°52′S 148°17′E

Statistics
- Burned area: 20,000 hectares (49,000 acres)
- Land use: Mixed, residential and national parks

Impacts
- Deaths: 1 firefighter
- Injuries: Unknown
- Structures destroyed: At least 170 (including 30 homes)
- Cost: c. A$69 million

Ignition
- Cause: Lightning; Abandoned campfire; Accidental (Forcett fire)

Locations of the 2013 Tasmanian bushfires in Tasmania

The 2013 Tasmanian bushfires were a series of bushfires which occurred in south-eastern Tasmania, Australia, between November 2012 and late April 2013. The fires burnt approximately 20,000 hectares (49,000 acres) of mixed resident land and native forest.

It was predicted early on that the 2012-13 fire season had the potential to be worse than usual. High fuel loads coupled with dry, hot and windy conditions pointed to potential danger. The Tasmania Fire Service implemented a media campaign intended to increase community preparedness and awareness of what to do if bushfires threatened, however, nobody predicted that the fire season would last for almost 6 months, a duration unprecedented in recorded Tasmanian history.

== Fire activity ==
=== November/December 2012 ===
During November and December 2012, several significant fire incidents took place, including one fire at Forcett in the state's south-east. Several firefighters involved in this incident were injured due to a wind change on 29 November 2012. Another major fire in the central lakes region (Interlaken Rd, Steppes) was originally reported on 18 December 2012 and was still burning in mid January. There were other blazes at Glenlusk, on the outskirts of Hobart, which destroyed several vehicles and some makeshift dwellings or shacks, while another fire at Rhyndaston Road, Rhyndaston, took weeks to control. Extensive efforts were made to control these fires before the expected heat wave at the start of January 2013.

=== January 2013 ===
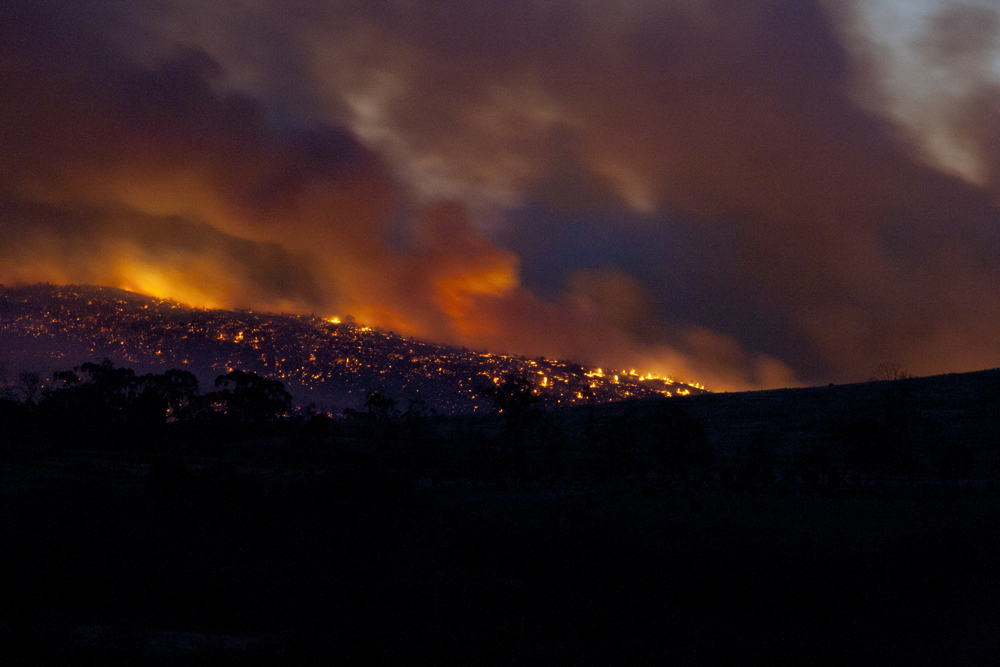
Bushfire in the Lake Repulse/Meadowbank area

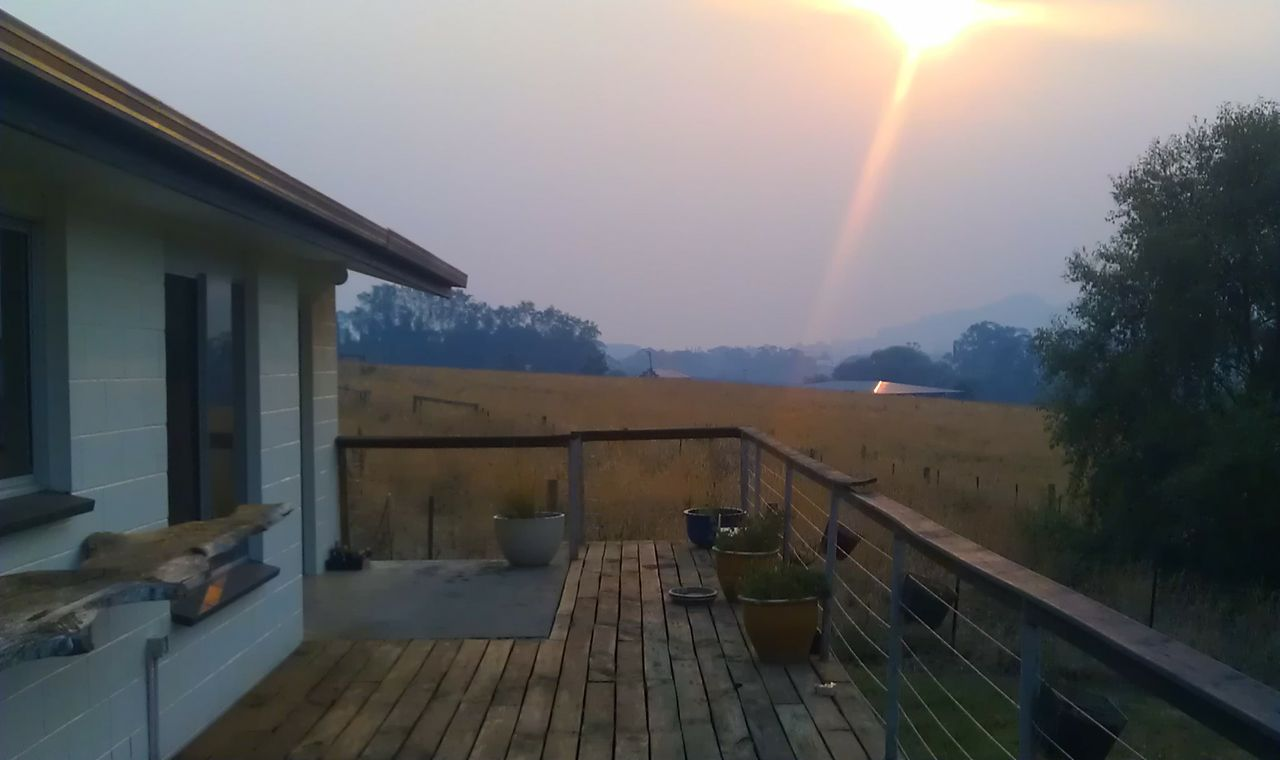
Sunset over Huon Valley, seen through thick smoke during the Tasmanian bushfires on 6 January

During 3 and 4 January 2013, most of the southern and eastern portion of the Australian continent experienced a heat wave (nicknamed the Angry Summer) which caused a number of fires to spread across the country. The most devastating of these happened in Tasmania, where several large bushfires burnt out of control. The fires were intensified by the heatwave, with Hobart, at 4:05 pm on 4 January, experiencing 41.8 °C (107.2 °F): the city's highest temperature since records began in 1882.

Communities affected by the fires included Bicheno, Boomer Bay, Connellys Marsh, Copping, Dunalley, Eaglehawk Neck, Forcett, Murdunna, Primrose Sands, Sommers Bay, Susan Bay, and Taranna. By 5 January, up to 40 fires were burning across Tasmania and at least one hundred properties were destroyed. More than 20,000 hectares (49,000 acres) of bushland were burnt out and some of the buildings lost included sixty-five in Dunalley (including the police station, primary school and bakery), fifteen in nearby Boomer Bay, twelve in Bicheno, and fourteen in Sommers Bay.

Communities on the Tasman and Forestier peninsulas in south-east Tasmania were forced to flee fires coming down from the north, engulfing the only road out of the area and destroying much of Dunalley. A seaborne rescue operation described as "huge" was launched for the thousands of people sheltering on beaches, in boats, and at the Port Arthur historic site. More than 2,000 people were ferried to safety by police, commercial vessel operators and private volunteers, and another 2,000 took refuge at a community centre at Nubeena.

A large fire on the Giblin River in January 2013 was not attended to and burnt much of the Southwest National Park.

=== February 2013 ===
Firefighters in the southern half of the state were concerned that a return of the hot weather from the mainland in early February would see a return to elevated fire danger. Attempts were made to ensure that the community understood that the fire season was not yet over. There was concern about a possible repeat of conditions similar to those during the 1967 fires, or the 1933–34 season. On 6 February 2013, a significant fire started on Glen Dhu Road in the Molesworth area and spread rapidly, with swirling winds causing unusual and unpredictable fire behaviour. Due to the rugged nature of the terrain, water-bombing helicopters were used extensively, despite significant dangers posed by high-power transmission lines and smoke. One helicopter (a Firebird 427) crashed while fighting the blaze, though the pilot survived. At least two other major blazes were fought on the same date, with blazes at Franklin in the Huon Valley, and Lefroy, near Georgetown.

=== March and April 2013 ===
Several fires occurred in early March, including one at Risdon Vale, an eastern shore suburb of Hobart. Starting on rugged terrain on 6 March 2013, this fast-moving fire directly threatened homes almost immediately. At least 20 crews from the Tasmania Fire Service responded. The fire spread to the south and east of Risdon Vale, eventually threatening homes on Richmond Road and Cambridge a week later. The fires continued to burn until a major spate of fires occurred on 27 April 2013, the most dangerous of which was at Tea Tree Road, Tea Tree, and which spread into the Coal River Valley, threatening Richmond before it was brought under control by Tasmania Fire Service crews.

== Response ==
Prime Minister Julia Gillard toured Sorell and Dunalley on 7 January.

New Zealand sent twelve of its firefighters on a sixteen-day mission to help battle the blazes. One New Zealand firefighter said the conditions were considerably different from what they were used to at home, and that burnt-out falling trees were a real threat to safety. Firefighters and incident managers from Victoria were also deployed.

On 13 January, a Victorian Department of Sustainability and Environment firefighter, Peter Cramer, 61, died of natural causes while carrying out a reconnaissance on the southern edge of the Forcett fire near the hamlet of Taranna. His body was found about 2 kilometres (1.2 mi) from the southern edge fire front. On the same day, the Arthur Highway on the Tasman Peninsula was reopened after the fire that started on 3 January had burnt out an area of over 24,060 hectares (59,500 acres).

=== Assistance to victims ===
On 6 January, the Minister for Emergency Management Nicola Roxon announced that the Australian Government would grant A$1,000 to Tasmanians affected by the bushfire.

The Australian Red Cross established a specific fund to assist victims and affected communities.

=== Reactions ===
On 6 January, Queen Elizabeth sent a message expressing her concern for the victims of the bushfires in Tasmania. The message was passed on by Tasmanian Governor Peter Underwood, and read;

I would like to convey my deep concern for all those who have been affected by the devastating bushfires that have caused widespread destruction across Tasmania.
I send my sympathy to those people who have lost their homes or livelihoods in the fires, and offer my support and admiration for the firefighters, volunteers and emergency services officers who have been working tirelessly to contain the situation.

The Catholic Archbishop of Hobart, The Most Reverend Adrian Doyle, received a message from Pope Benedict XVI saying that the Pope was saddened about the widespread destruction and thanking firefighters and emergency workers.

== See also ==
- 2016 Tasmanian bushfires
