= Arthur Highway =

Highway in Tasmania, Australia

Arthur Highway Tasmania

General information
- Type: Highway
- Length: 69.9 km (43 mi)
- Route number(s): A9; Sorell – Port Arthur
- Former route number: State Route 7

Major junctions
- North end: Tasman Highway; Sorell, Tasmania
- Nubeena Road
- South end: Nubeena Road; Safety Cove Road; Port Arthur, Tasmania

Location(s)
- Major settlements: Copping, Dunalley, Eaglehawk Neck

Highway system
- Highways in Australia; National Highway • Freeways in Australia; Highways in Tasmania

The Arthur Highway (A9) is a Tasmanian highway which runs from Sorell in the near south to Port Arthur in the far south-east.

== Route description ==
From a roundabout with the Tasman Highway outside Sorell, the highway runs northeast to another roundabout roughly housing its former alignment inside Sorell, crossing Iron Creek before turning south-east to Forcett. From there it continues east, crossing the Carlton River, to Copping, where it turns south to Dunalley. Here it crosses the Denison Canal via a swing bridge to the Forestier Peninsula, before continuing south-east to Eaglehawk Neck, the entry to the Tasman Peninsula. After following the southern shore of Eaglehawk Bay to the west, the highway turns south and continues in that direction to Port Arthur, where it transitions to route B37 (Nubeena Road).

== History ==
Port Arthur (the town) was named for George Arthur, the lieutenant governor of Van Diemen’s Land. It is likely that the name of the highway was derived from this source.

The first "proper" crossing of the Carlton River, near the line now followed by the highway, was opened in 1883. It consisted of multiple wooden bridges and causeways. Work commenced on a concrete bridge, a replacement for all three wooden bridges on a slightly altered alignment, in 1944.

The Denison Canal opened in 1905 with a wooden, manually operated swing bridge. This was replaced by an electrically operated bridge in 1965.

The highway used to end at traffic signals at a rather space-limited dogleg intersection with Tasman Highway and Station Lane in the centre of Sorell. The first stage of the Sorell Bypass opened in 2022, slightly extending Arthur Highway south toward Hobart just outside Sorell, avoiding the town. This allowed traffic to bypass Sorell instead of going right through the town on Tasman Highway or using Parsonage Place (to which was applied a 5-tonne limit, despite accompanying stop-gap improvements and a rename). There is a reserve towards William Street in which Tasman Highway will once bypass the town, but currently the traffic must still use the old Arthur Highway terminus to exit the town northwest.

== Major intersections ==
LGA	Location	km	mi	Destinations	Notes
Sorell	Sorell	0	0.0	Tasman Highway (A3) – north – Penna, Orford, Richmond / south – Cambridge, Hobart	Northern end of Arthur Highway
Sorell	Sorell	1.3	0.81	Arthur Highway (old) (A3) – west – Penna, Pawleena; Nugent Road (C331) – northeast – Wattle Hill, Nugent	Roundabout with side junction, replaces northbound T-junction; Nugent Road extended west, replaces former alignment of Arthur Highway
Iron Creek		2.9– 3.0	1.8– 1.9	Bridge over creek (name not known)	
Sorell	Forcett	5.6	3.5	Lewisham Scenic Drive (C340) – south – Lewisham	
Sorell	Forcett	7.1	4.4	Old Forcett Road (C334) – south – Dodges Ferry	
Sorell	Forcett	7.5	4.7	Delmore Road (C333) – northeast – Wattle Hill	
Sorell	Forcett	11.9	7.4	Sugarloaf Road (C349) – south – Carlton River	
Carlton River		19.0	11.8	Bridge over river (name not known)	
Sorell	Copping	21.6	13.4	Kellevie Road (C335) – north – Kellevie	
Sorell	Copping	22.4	13.9	Marion Bay Road (C337) – east – Bream Creek	
Sorell	Dunalley	29.6	18.4	Bay Road (C337) – northeast – Marion Bay	
Sorell	Dunalley	32.0	19.9	Fulham Road (C334) – west – Connellys Marsh	
Denison Canal		32.1	19.9	Swing bridge over canal (name not known)	
Tasman	Taranna	60.2	37.4	Nubeena Road (B37) – northwest – Nubeena	
Tasman	Port Arthur	70.2	43.6	Safety Cove Road (C347) – south – Port Arthur	Southern end of Arthur Highway. Road continues as Nubeena Road (B37)
1.000 mi = 1.609 km; 1.000 km = 0.621 mi

== See also ==
- Highways in Australia
- List of highways in Tasmania
