= Wattle Hill, Tasmania =

Wattle Hill
- Town
- Coordinates: 42°45′40″S 147°39′27″E
- Country: Australia
- State: Tasmania
- Region: Sorell and surrounds
- LGA: Sorell
- Location: 35 km (22 mi) NE of Hobart

Government
  - State electorate: Lyons
  - Federal division: Lyons

Population
  - Total: 176 (SAL 2021)
- Postcode: 7172
Localities around Wattle Hill
Pawleena	Buckland	Nugent
Pawleena	Wattle Hill	Kellevie
Sorell	Forcett	Copping

Wattle Hill is a locality and small rural community in the local government area of Sorell, in the Sorell and surrounds region of Tasmania. It is located about 35 kilometres (22 mi) north-east of the town of Hobart.

== History ==
The locality name was gazetted in 1972.

The 2016 census determined a population of 187 for the state suburb of Wattle Hill. At the 2021 census, the population had decreased to 176.

== Road infrastructure ==
The C331 route (Nugent Road) runs northeast from the Arthur Highway through the locality, providing access to many other localities. The C332 route (Shrub End Road) enters the locality from Pawleena in the northwest and intersects with the C331, while the C333 route (Delmore Road) runs north from the Arthur Highway and also intersects with the C331.
