= Carlton, Tasmania =

Carlton Tasmania
- Coordinates: 42°52′13″S 147°38′19″E
- Population: 1,119 (2016 census)
- Postcode(s): 7173
- Location: 15 km (9 mi) SE of Sorell
- LGA(s): Sorell
- Region: Hobart
- State electorate(s): Lyons
- Federal division(s): Lyons
Localities around Carlton:
Forcett	Forcett	Carlton River
Dodges Ferry	Carlton	Carlton River
Frederick Henry Bay	Primrose Sands	Carlton River

Carlton is a part rural, part residential locality in the local government area of Sorell in the Hobart region of Tasmania. It is located about 15 kilometres (9.3 mi) south-east of the town of Sorell. The 2016 census determined a population of 1119 for the state suburb of Carlton.

== History ==
Carlton was gazetted as a locality in 1967.

== Geography ==
The shore of Frederick Henry Bay, known as Carlton Beach, is the southern boundary.

== Road infrastructure ==
The C334 route (Carlton River Road) enters from the west and runs through to the east, where it exits.
