= Dunalley, Tasmania =

Dunalley
- Town
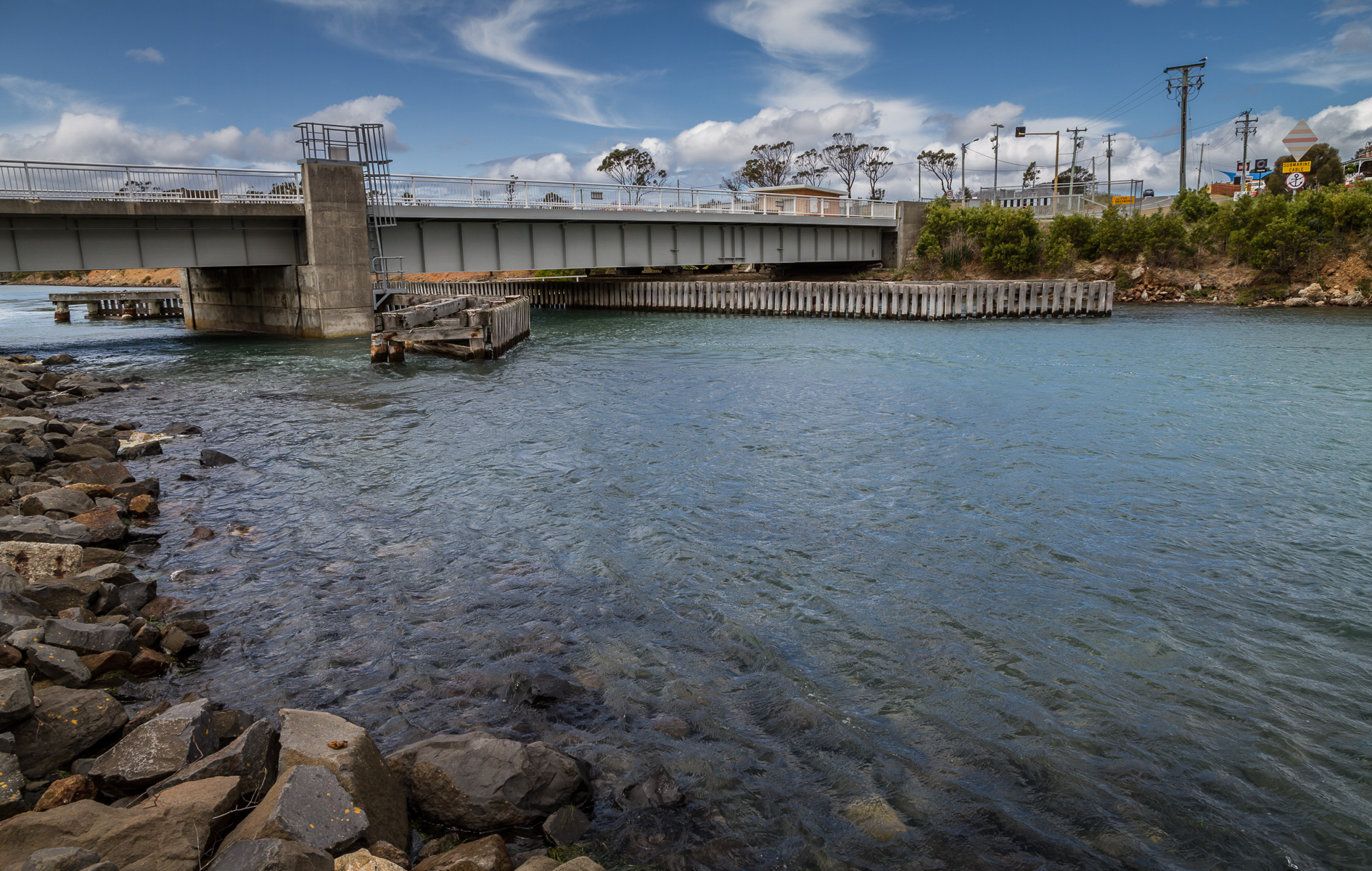
- Denison Canal bridge in Dunalley

- Coordinates: 42°53′S 147°48′E
- Country: Australia
- State: Tasmania
- Region: South-east
- LGA: Sorell, Tasman
- Location: 22 km (14 mi) from Port Arthur; 40 km (25 mi) from Orford; 31 km (19 mi) SE of Sorell; 53 km (33 mi) from Hobart

Government
  - State electorate: Lyons
  - Federal division: Lyons
- Elevation: 12 m (39 ft)

Population
  - Total: 304 (2021 census)
- Postcode: 7177
- Mean max temp: 17.5 °C (63.5 °F)
- Mean min temp: 10.0 °C (50.0 °F)
- Annual rainfall: 528.3 mm (20.80 in)
Localities around Dunalley
Carlton River	Copping	Boomer Bay
Carlton River	Dunalley	Boomer Bay
Connellys Marsh	Murdunna	Murdunna

Dunalley is a rural / residential locality in the local government areas (LGA) of Sorell (37%) and Tasman (63%) in the South-east LGA region of Tasmania. The locality is about 31 kilometres (19 mi) south-east of the town of Sorell. The 2021 census recorded a population of 304 for the state suburb of Dunalley. It is a small fishing village on the east coast of Tasmania.

Dunalley is approximately 57 km (35 mi) east of Hobart on the Arthur Highway and 20 minutes from Sorell. It is located on the narrow isthmus which separates the Forestier and Tasman Peninsulas from the rest of Tasmania.

== History ==
Dunalley was gazetted as a locality in 1967.

The Denison Canal, with a swing bridge for road traffic, has been cut between Dunalley Bay and Blackman Bay to allow boats easy access between the two bays. It was originally hand dug. The project started in 1901 and was completed in 1905. In 1965 a new hydraulic swing bridge replaced the original bridge. It is common for Sydney–Hobart yacht racers returning to Sydney to use the canal as a convenient shortcut.

Dunalley was badly affected by bushfires on 4 January 2013, with the town losing about 65 structures, including the police station, school, bakery and local residences.

Dunalley was first named East Bay Neck but was renamed Dunalley after Henry Prittie, 3rd Baron Dunalley (1807–1885). Dunalley came from Kilboy in the County of Tipperary, Ireland.

A survey map of the region that became Dunalley (from the 1800s) is available online to the public.

== Geography ==
The waters of Frederick Henry Bay and Norfolk Bay form part of the southern boundary. The waters of Blackman Bay and Marion Bay form parts of the northern and eastern boundaries.

=== Climate ===
Dunalley experiences an oceanic climate (Köppen: Cfb) with pleasant, relatively dry summers and cool, wetter winters. The wettest recorded day was 14 January 2015 with 73.6 mm (2.90 in) of rainfall. Extreme temperatures ranged from 39.0 °C (102.2 °F) on 30 December 2019 to 0.7 °C (33.3 °F) on 3 August 2015.

Climate data for Dunalley (42.90°S 147.79°E) (12 m (39 ft) AMSL) (2012-2025)
Month	Jan	Feb	Mar	Apr	May	Jun	Jul	Aug	Sep	Oct	Nov	Dec	Year
Record high °C (°F)	38.1 (100.6)	37.4 (99.3)	36.9 (98.4)	31.4 (88.5)	23.9 (75.0)	19.7 (67.5)	19.1 (66.4)	21.9 (71.4)	28.0 (82.4)	32.6 (90.7)	37.7 (99.9)	39.0 (102.2)	39.0 (102.2)
Mean daily maximum °C (°F)	22.5 (72.5)	21.9 (71.4)	20.9 (69.6)	18.2 (64.8)	15.3 (59.5)	13.0 (55.4)	12.8 (55.0)	13.6 (56.5)	15.6 (60.1)	17.0 (62.6)	18.6 (65.5)	20.6 (69.1)	17.5 (63.5)
Mean daily minimum °C (°F)	14.0 (57.2)	13.7 (56.7)	12.9 (55.2)	10.8 (51.4)	8.7 (47.7)	7.0 (44.6)	6.4 (43.5)	6.5 (43.7)	7.8 (46.0)	9.1 (48.4)	10.7 (51.3)	12.2 (54.0)	10.0 (50.0)
Record low °C (°F)	6.9 (44.4)	7.9 (46.2)	6.2 (43.2)	5.1 (41.2)	3.1 (37.6)	0.8 (33.4)	1.0 (33.8)	0.7 (33.3)	2.0 (35.6)	2.9 (37.2)	3.6 (38.5)	5.8 (42.4)	0.7 (33.3)
Average precipitation mm (inches)	47.7 (1.88)	27.9 (1.10)	36.9 (1.45)	35.7 (1.41)	51.2 (2.02)	55.0 (2.17)	39.0 (1.54)	46.1 (1.81)	39.9 (1.57)	57.6 (2.27)	44.7 (1.76)	45.4 (1.79)	528.3 (20.80)
Average precipitation days (≥ 0.2 mm)	9.1	10.4	9.7	10.9	13.8	15.3	15.2	15.6	14.1	13.8	13.2	12.2	153.3
Source: Bureau of Meteorology (2012-2025)

== Road infrastructure ==
Route A9 (Arthur Highway) runs through from north to south.
