= Penna, Tasmania =

Penna
- Suburb
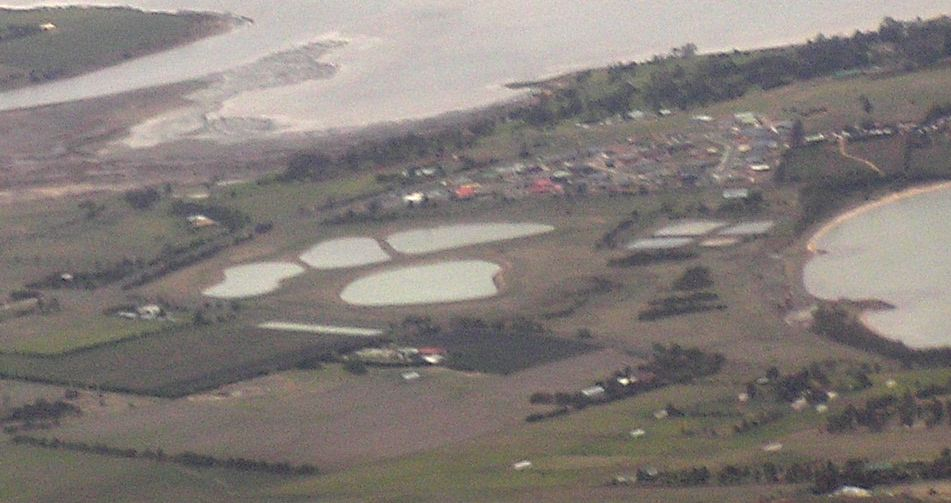
- Aerial view

- Interactive map of Penna
- Coordinates: 42°46′00″S 147°32′00″E
- Country: Australia
- State: Tasmania
- Region: South-east
- City: Hobart
- LGA: Sorell
- Location: 5 km (3.1 mi) NW of Sorell

Government
  - State electorate: Lyons
  - Federal division: Lyons

Population
  - Total: 422 (2016 census)
- Postcode: 7171
Suburbs around Penna
| Orielton, Richmond | Richmond, Orielton | Orielton |
| Cambridge | Penna | Sorell, Orielton |
| Pitt Water | Midway Point | Pitt Water, Midway Point |

Penna is a rural residential locality in the local government area (LGA) of Sorell in the South-east LGA region of Tasmania. The locality is about 5 kilometres (3.1 mi) north-west of the town of Sorell. The 2016 census recorded a population of 422 for the state suburb of Penna.

== History ==
An early farm in the area was named "Pennar", and this is the most likely source of the name. Others have been suggested, including an Aboriginal word for either "man" or "man and wife". Penna was gazetted as a locality in 1972.

Frogmore Post Office opened on 30 October 1914. It was renamed "Penna" next month and closed in 1955.

== Geography ==
The waters of Pitt Water, an inlet of Frederick Henry Bay, form the south-western boundary and parts of the western and south-eastern.

== Road infrastructure ==
Route C351 (Brinktop Road) enters from the north-west and runs through to the east, where it exits.
