= Pawleena, Tasmania =

Pawleena Tasmania
- Coordinates: 42°44′56″S 147°34′48″E
- Population: 102 (2016 census)
- Postcode(s): 7172
- Location: 30 km (19 mi) NE of Hobart
- LGA(s): Sorell
- Region: Sorell and surrounds
- State electorate(s): Lyons
- Federal division(s): Lyons
Localities around Pawleena:
Orielton	Runnymede	Buckland
Orielton	Pawleena	Nugent
Sorell	Sorell	Wattle Hill

Pawleena is a locality and small rural community in the local government area of Sorell, in the Sorell and surrounds region of Tasmania. It is located about 30 kilometres (19 mi) north-east of the town of Hobart. The 2016 census determined a population of 102 for the state suburb of Pawleena.

== History ==
The original name of the locality was “Cherry Tree Opening”. The current name dates from about 1923. It is an Aboriginal word for “gun”.

== Road infrastructure ==
The C332 route (Pawleena Road) runs north from the Arthur Highway into the locality.
