= Lewisham, Tasmania =

Lewisham Tasmania
- Coordinates: 42°49′44″S 147°36′46″E
- Population: 799 (SAL 2021)
- Postcode(s): 7173
- Location: 35 km (22 mi) NE of Hobart
- LGA(s): Sorell
- Region: Sorell and surrounds
- State electorate(s): Lyons
- Federal division(s): Lyons
Suburbs around Lewisham:
Forcett	Forcett	Forcett
Pitt Water	Lewisham	Forcett
Pitt Water	Dodges Ferry	Forcett

Lewisham is a locality and suburb in the local government area of Sorell, in the Sorell and surrounds region of Tasmania. It is located about 35 kilometres (22 mi) north-east of the town of Hobart. The 2021 census determined a population of 799 for the locality of Lewisham.

== History ==
The locality is named for the family of Arndell Lewis, an Australian politician. It was proclaimed as a town in 1957, and changed to a suburb/locality in 1988. The shore of Pitt Water forms the western and south-western boundaries.

== Road infrastructure ==
The C340 route (Lewisham Scenic Drive) runs south from the Arthur Highway through the locality, providing access to other localities.
