= Boomer Island (Tasmania) =

Island in Tasmania, Australia

- Location in Tasmania

Geography
- Coordinates: 42°52′16″S 147°50′28″E
- Adjacent to: Boomer Bay, Blackman Bay, Tasman Sea

Administration
- Australia
- State: Tasmania
- Region: South East

Additional information
- Time zone: AEST (UTC+10)
  - Summer (DST): AEDT (UTC+11)

Boomer Island is a tied island in the south east region of Tasmania, Australia. It is known for a large castle built upon it and is owned by Gunter Jaeger, a businessman.

== Tenure ==
The landmass is Crown land from the high-water mark to 30 metres inland. The landlocked parcel of land within this crown land is privately owned.

== Geography ==
An artificial tombolo connects the landmass to the mainland in Boomer Bay, which itself lies within Blackman Bay.

The island can be seen in several public photographs.

== See also ==
- List of islands of Tasmania
