= Primrose Sands, Tasmania =

Primrose Sands
- Town
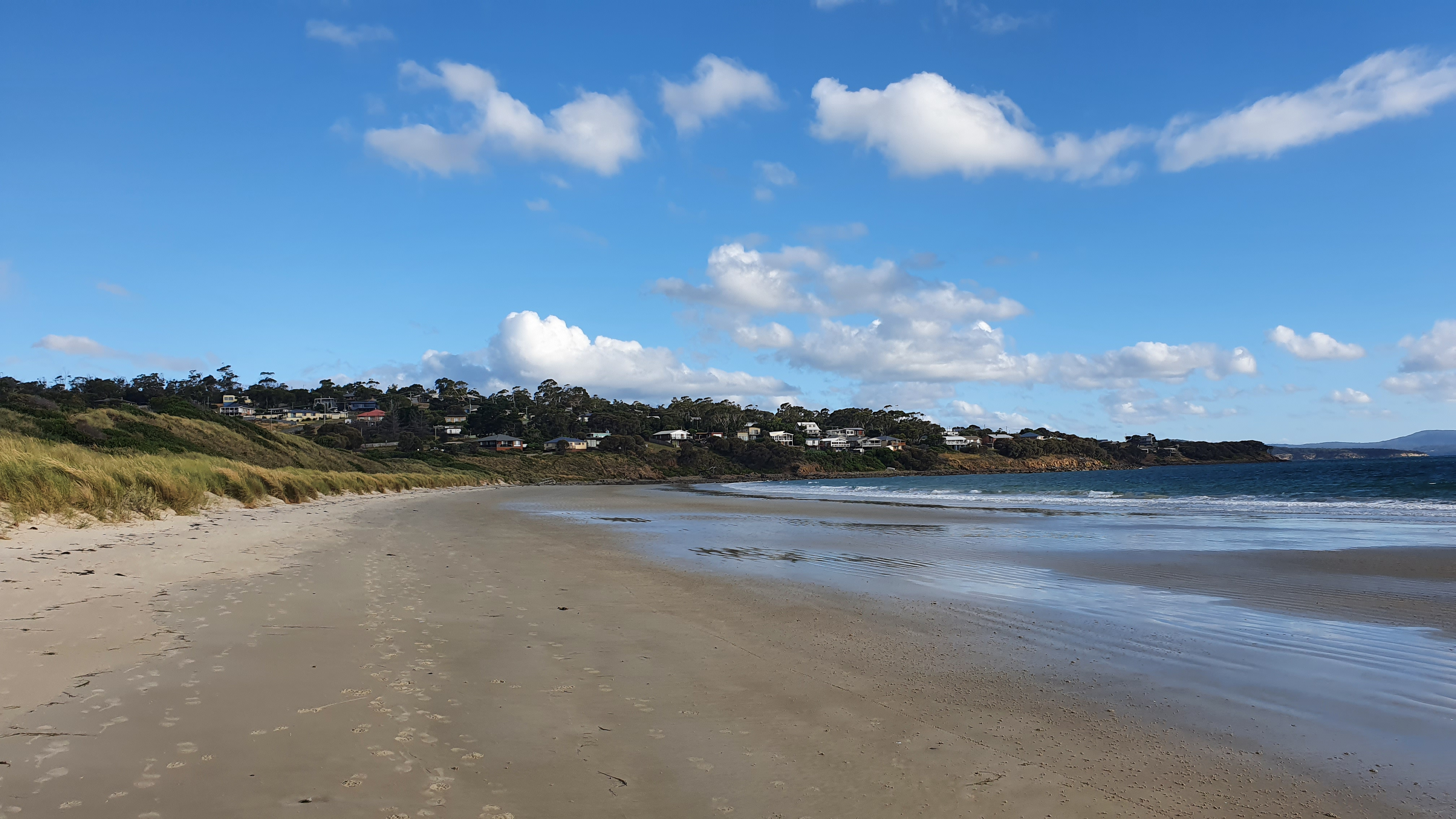

- Coordinates: 42°52′54″S 147°40′29″E
- Country: Australia
- State: Tasmania
- Region: South-east
- LGA: Sorell
- Location: 20 km (12 mi) SE of Sorell; 47 km (29 mi) E of Hobart

Government
  - State electorate: Lyons
  - Federal division: Lyons

Population
  - Total: 1,209 (2021)
- Postcode: 7173
Localities around Primrose Sands
Carlton	Carlton River	Copping
Frederick Henry Bay	Primrose Sands	Connellys Marsh
Frederick Henry Bay	Frederick Henry Bay	Frederick Henry Bay

Primrose Sands is a mixed urban and rural locality in the local government area of Sorell in the South-east region of Tasmania. The locality is about 20 kilometres (12 mi) south-east of the town of Sorell. The 2021 Australian census recorded a population of 1209 for the state suburb of Primrose Sands.

It is a sea-side locality that lies at the northern channel between Frederick Henry Bay and Norfolk Bay. Though primarily a holiday home community, it has a large permanent population. In 2010 the median house price in Hobart was under $3350,000. Over 50% of houses in Primrose Sands are unoccupied most of the year.

The town is home to an Returned and Services League of Australia club, community centre and a combined store and post office.

== History ==
Primrose Sands was gazetted as a locality in 1972.

Primrose Point, which lies in the township, was named "Point Renard" by d'Entrecasteaux, on 5 November 1792, after his surgeon, Recherche.

== Geography ==
The shore of Frederick Henry Bay forms the western and southern boundaries, and the Carlton River forms most of the northern.

== Road infrastructure ==
The C349 route (Primrose Sands Road) enters from the north-east and runs through to the south-west, where it ends.
