= Connellys Marsh =

- Town
- Coordinates: 42°53′15″S 147°43′43″E
- Country: Australia
- State: Tasmania
- Region: South-east
- LGA: Sorell
- Location: 21 km (13 mi) SE of Sorell; 47 km (29 mi) E of Hobart

Government
  - State electorate: Lyons
  - Federal division: Lyons

Population
  - Total: 40 (2021 census)
- Postcode: 7173
Localities around Connellys Marsh
Carlton River	Carlton River	Dunalley
Primrose Sands	Connellys Marsh	Dunalley
Primrose Sands	Norfolk Bay	Dunalley

Connellys Marsh is a small rural community in the Sorell and surrounds region of Tasmania. It is located about 47 kilometres (29 mi) east of the town of Hobart, and sits on the northern edge of Norfolk Bay.

== History ==
Connellys Marsh was a wheat and farming settlement during early European settlement of Tasmania. From the 1930s it became a shack town, with most owners being temporary occupants during the holidays. In the early 2000s a greater proportion of people began living there permanently. The community was badly impacted by the 2013 Tasmanian bushfires.

== Geomorphology ==
The surrounding area is characteristic of a Ria or drowned river coastline.

== Locality ==
Connellys Marsh is also the name of the encompassing locality which covered by the Sorell Council. The 2021 Census recorded a population of 40 for the state suburb of Connellys Marsh. It was gazetted as a locality in 1967.

== Road infrastructure ==
The C334 route (Fulham Road) runs west from the Arthur Highway to the town.
