= Bream Creek =

- Town
- Coordinates: 42°49′19″S 147°50′18″E
- Country: Australia
- State: Tasmania
- Region: South-east
- LGA: Sorell
- Location: 25 km (16 mi) E of Sorell

Government
  - State electorate: Lyons
  - Federal division: Lyons

Population
  - Total: 124 (2016 census)
- Postcode: 7175
Localities around Bream Creek
Buckland	Rheban	Rheban
Kellevie	Bream Creek	Tasman Sea
Copping	Boomer Bay	Marion Bay

Bream Creek is a rural locality in the local government area (LGA) of Sorell in the South-east LGA region of Tasmania. The locality is about 25 kilometres (16 mi) east of the town of Sorell. The 2016 census recorded a population of 124 for the state suburb of Bream Creek.

== History ==
Bream Creek was gazetted as a locality in 1968.

== Geography ==
The waters of the Tasman Sea form most of the eastern boundary.

== Road infrastructure ==
Route C337 (Marion Bay Road) enters from the south-west and runs through to the south-east, where it exits. Route C336 (Bream Creek Road) starts at an intersection with Route C337 and runs north-east through the south-west of the locality before turning west and exiting.

== Bream Creek Show ==
Bream Creek is best known for the Bream Creek Show, held since 1886. The show is famous for its giant pumpkin competition.
