= Orielton, Tasmania =

Orielton
- Town
- Coordinates: 42°43′08″S 147°31′05″E
- Country: Australia
- State: Tasmania
- Region: Central, Hobart
- LGA: Southern Midlands, Sorell, Clarence
- Location: 10 km (6.2 mi) NW of Sorell

Government
  - State electorate: Lyons, Prosser
  - Federal division: Lyons

Population
  - Total: 355 (2016 census)
- Postcode: 7172
Localities around Orielton
Campania	Runnymede	Pawleena, Runnymede
Richmond, Campania	Orielton	Pawleena
Penna	Penna, Pawleena	Pawleena

Orielton is a rural locality in the local government area of Sorell in the Central and Hobart regions of Tasmania, Australia. It is located about 10 kilometres (6 mi) north-west of the town of Sorell. The 2016 census determined a population of 355 for the state suburb of Orielton.

== History ==
Orielton was gazetted as a locality in 1960.

== Geography ==
Most boundaries of the locality are survey lines.

The Orielton Rivulet is an intermittent stream that flows through the locality into the Orielton Lagoon near Sorell.

== Road infrastructure ==
The Tasman Highway (A3) enters from the south and runs through via the town to the north, where it exits. Route C350 (Fingerpost Road) starts at an intersection with A3 and runs north-west until it exits.
