= Boomer Bay, Tasmania =

Boomer Bay
- Town
- Coordinates: 42°51′16″S 147°49′53″E
- Country: Australia
- State: Tasmania
- Region: South-east
- LGA: Sorell
- Location: 27 km (17 mi) E of Sorell

Government
  - State electorate: Lyons
  - Federal division: Lyons

Population
  - Total: 93 (2016 census)
- Postcode: 7177
Localities around Boomer Bay
Copping	Copping	Marion Bay
Dunalley, Copping	Boomer Bay	Blackman Bay
Dunalley	Dunalley	Blackman Bay

Boomer Bay is a rural locality in the local government area (LGA) of Sorell in the South-east LGA region of Tasmania. The locality is about 27 kilometres (17 mi) east of the town of Sorell. The 2016 census recorded a population of 93 for the state suburb of Boomer Bay. It is also a bay within Blackman Bay. Boomer Bay contains Boomer Island.

== History ==
Boomer Bay is a confirmed locality.

== Geography ==
The eastern boundary follows the shoreline of Blackman Bay.

== Road infrastructure ==
Route A9 (Arthur Highway) runs along part of the western boundary. From there, Boomer Road and Bay Road provide access to the locality.
