= Carlton River, Tasmania =

Carlton River
- Town
- Coordinates: 42°51′14″S 147°41′05″E
- Country: Australia
- State: Tasmania
- Region: Sorell and surrounds
- LGA: Sorell
- Location: 45 km (28 mi) E of Hobart

Government
  - State electorate: Lyons
  - Federal division: Lyons

Population
  - Total: 265 (2016)
- Postcode: 7173
Localities around Carlton River
Forcett	Forcett, Copping	Copping
Carlton	Carlton River	Copping, Dunalley
Primrose Sands	Flinders Channel, Connellys Marsh	Dunalley

Carlton River is a locality and small rural community in the local government area of Sorell, in the Sorell and surrounds region of Tasmania. It is located about 45 kilometres (28 mi) east of the town of Hobart. The shore of Flinders Channel forms part of the southern boundary. The 2016 census determined a population of 265 for the state suburb of Carlton River.

== History ==
The locality is likely named for the stream Carlton River that passes through it from north-east to south-west.

== Road infrastructure ==
The C349 route (Sugarloaf Road) runs south from the Arthur Highway through the locality, providing access to Primrose Sands. The C334 route (Carlton River Road) passes through the locality from west to east.
