= Forcett, Tasmania =

Forcett
- Town
- Coordinates: 42°49′07″S 147°40′42″E
- Country: Australia
- State: Tasmania
- Region: South-east
- LGA: Sorell
- Location: 10 km (6.2 mi) SE of Sorell

Government
  - State electorate: Lyons
  - Federal division: Lyons

Population
  - Total: 964 (2016 census)
- Postcode: 7173
Localities around Forcett
| Sorell | Wattle Hill, Sorell | Kellevie |
| Sorell, Pitt Water Estury | Forcett | Copping |
| Lewisham | Carlton River, Carlton, Dodges Ferry | Carlton River |

Forcett is a mainly rural locality, with an urban area on the outskirts of neighbouring Lewisham. It is in the local government area of Sorell in the South-east region of Tasmania. The locality is about 10 kilometres (6.2 mi) south-east of the town of Sorell. The 2016 census recorded a population of 964 for the state suburb of Forcett.

== History ==
Forcett was gazetted as a locality in 1972. An early settler, James Gordon, was born in Forcett, Yorkshire in 1779.

== Geography ==
Most of the boundaries of the locality are survey lines. The shore of Pitt Water Estuary forms part of the western boundary.

== Road infrastructure ==
The A9 route (Arthur Highway) enters from the north-west and runs through to the east, where it exits. Route C333 (Delmore Road) starts at an intersection with A9 and runs north until it exits. Route C334 (Old Forcett Road) starts at an intersection with A9 and runs south until it exits. Route C340 (Lewisham Scenic Deive) starts at an intersection with A9 and runs south until it exits. Route C349 (Sugarloaf Road) starts at an intersection with A9 and runs south until it exits.
