= Marion Bay Important Bird Area =

Important Bird Area in Tasmania, Australia

Coordinates: 42°50′05″S 147°52′26″E

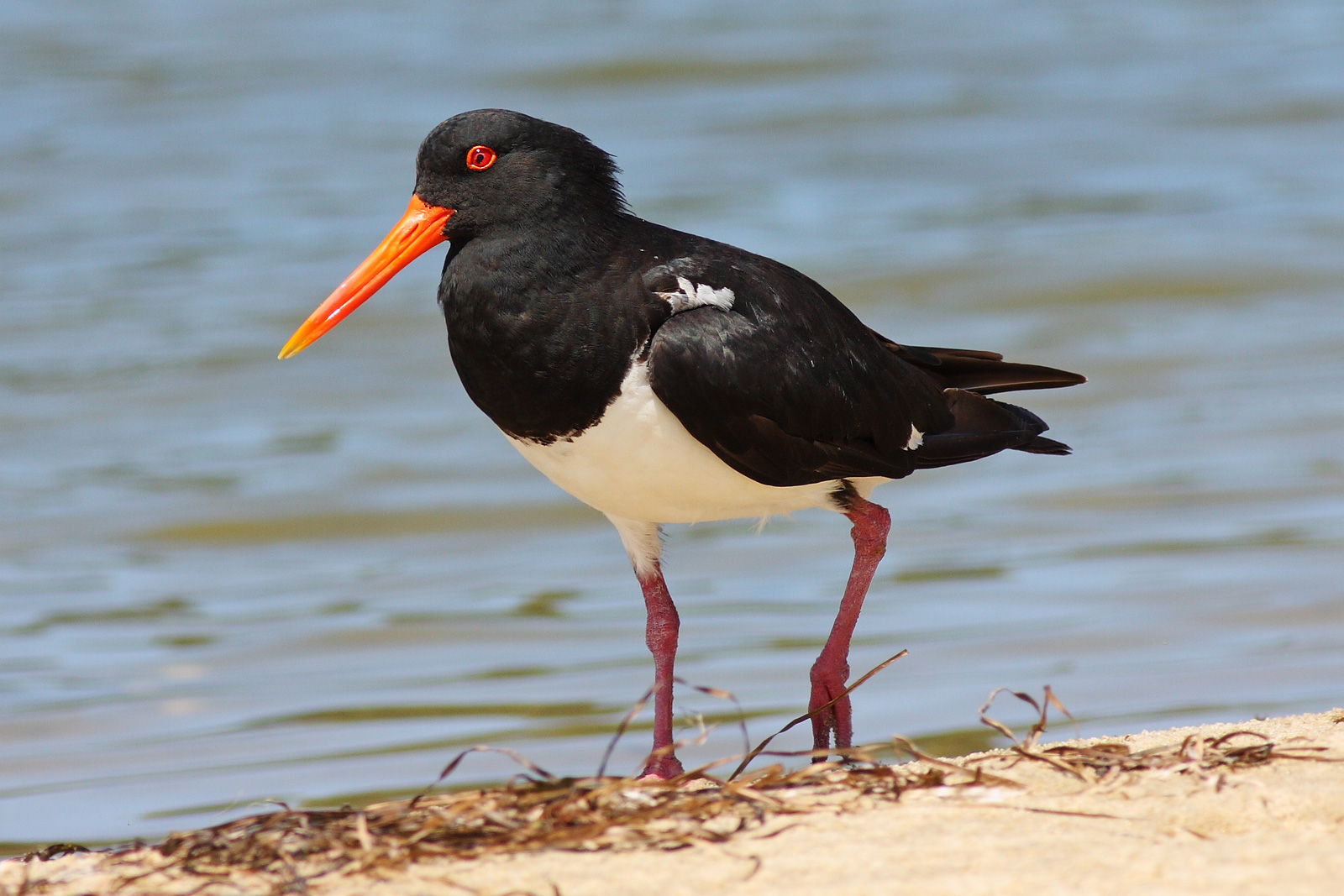
The area is important for pied oystercatchers

The Marion Bay Important Bird Area is on the south-western side of Marion Bay, south-eastern Tasmania, Australia. It includes two sandy, high-energy, oceanic beaches, Marion Bay Beach and North Bay Beach, encompasses the privately owned Long Spit Nature Reserve, and extends through the entrance of Blackman Bay to the intertidal mudflats within. The beaches and mudflats form a single system used by waders, or shorebirds; the storm-swept beaches of the outer bay contrast with and complement the sheltered mudflats and sand-bars of the inner bay.

== Birds ==
The system of beaches and mudflats has been identified by BirdLife International as a 584 ha Important Bird Area (IBA) because it regularly supports significant numbers of fairy terns and hooded plovers, as well as over 1% of the world population of pied oystercatchers. Red-necked stints use the IBA in substantial numbers, while other birds regularly recorded include curlew sandpipers, sooty oystercatchers and little terns.
