= Denison Canal =

Canal in Tasmania, Australia

Coordinates: 42°53′32″S 147°48′14″E

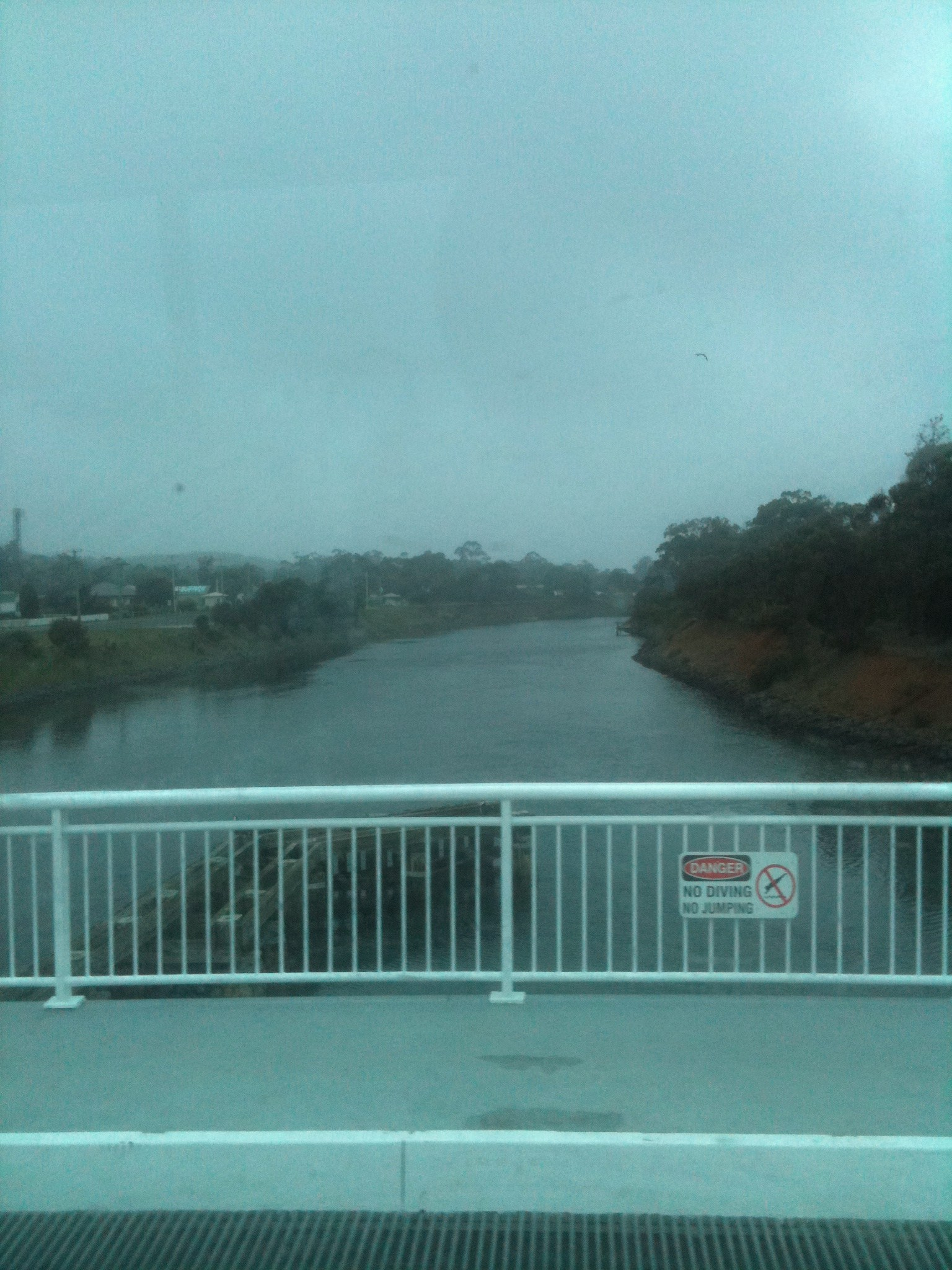
- The Denison Canal at Dunalley.
- Interactive map of Denison Canal

Specifications
- Length: 0.895 km (0.556 miles)
- Locks: Nil
- Status: Open

History
- Date completed: 1905

The Denison Canal is a human-made canal located at Dunalley in southern Tasmania, Australia. The canal opened for use in 1905 and draws its name from former Governor William Denison. The canal was built to shorten the fishing and trade routes between the east coast and Hobart.

== History ==
Proposals to dig a canal through the East Bay Neck were first made in 1820. However, no serious consideration was given to a canal until William Denison became governor in 1847. Denison had previously worked on the Rideau Canal in Canada, and commissioned a report into the possibility of building a canal at East Bay Neck in 1854. However, no work took place on the project.

Construction of the canal was revived early in the 20th century. The Tasmanian Government sought tenders for the project in 1901, and the firm Henrikson and Knutson were selected after lodging the lowest price (£17,999). The canal was designed by Napier Bell. While the contract specified that the canal was to be completed by 29 May 1904, the start of work on the project was delayed by negotiations over whether Henrikson and Knutson or the Tasmanian Government would retain ownership of the equipment needed to build the canal once it was complete. The canal was finally opened by Governor Sir Gerald Strickland on 13 October 1905. At this time it was reported to be the second-longest canal in Australia. The Denison Canal was bridged by a hand-operated swing bridge until 1965, when a larger and electrically operated bridge was installed.

== Characteristics ==
The Denison Canal is 895 metres (2,936 ft) long, or 2.42 kilometres (1.50 mi) long if its dredged approaches are included. It is 34 metres (112 ft) wide at ground level, dropping to 7 metres (23 ft) at low tide. Water depth varies from 3.9 metres (13 ft) at high tide to 2.6 metres (8.5 ft) at low tide. While the canal was once able to be used by small trading vessels, only small fishing and recreation boats can now pass through the shifting sand bars in Blackman Bay on the eastern approaches to the canal.

== See also ==
- Canals in Australia
