= Runnymede, Tasmania =

Runnymede
- Town
- Coordinates: 42°36′59″S 147°33′41″E
- Country: Australia
- State: Tasmania
- Region: Central, South-east
- LGA: Southern Midlands, Glamorgan–Spring Bay
- Location: 48 km (30 mi) SE of Oatlands

Government
  - State electorate: Lyons
  - Federal division: Lyons

Population
  - Total: 71 (2016 census)
- Postcode: 7190
Localities around Runnymede
Campania	Levendale	Buckland
Campania	Runnymede	Buckland
Orielton	Pawleena, Orielton	Pawleena

Runnymede is a rural locality and town in the local government areas of Southern Midlands and Glamorgan–Spring Bay in the Central and South-east regions of Tasmania. It is located about 48 kilometres (30 mi) south-east of the town of Oatlands. The 2016 census determined a population of 71 for the state suburb of Runnymede.

== History ==
Runnymede was gazetted as a locality in 1960.

== Geography ==
Most of the boundaries of the locality are survey lines.

== Road infrastructure ==
The Tasman Highway (A3) enters from the south-west and runs through via the town to the east, where it exits. Route C312 (Woodsdale Road) starts at an intersection with A3 and runs north until it exits.
