= Nugent, Tasmania =

Nugent
- Town
- Coordinates: 42°42′S 147°45′E
- Country: Australia
- State: Tasmania
- Region: South-east
- LGA: Glamorgan–Spring Bay, Sorell
- Location: 45 km (28 mi) NE of Hobart; 33 km (21 mi) E of Richmond, Tasmania; 18 km (11 mi) NE of Sorell

Government
  - State electorate: Lyons
  - Federal division: Lyons

Population
  - Total: 101 (2016 census)
- Postcode: 7172
Localities around Nugent
Buckland	Buckland	Buckland
Pawleena	Nugent	Kellevie
Wattle Hill	Wattle Hill	Kellevie

Nugent is a rural locality in the local government areas (LGA) of Glamorgan–Spring Bay and Sorell in the South-east LGA region of Tasmania. The locality is about 18 kilometres (11 mi) north-east of the town of Sorell. The 2016 census gives a population of 101 for the state suburb of Nugent. The town has a marine west coast, warm summer climate. Altitude is the main determinant of local climate in the region, and droughts are almost non-existent. The town experiences early autumn rainfall.

== History ==
The Nugent post office opened on 5 February 1883 and closed in 1968. Nugent was gazetted as a locality in 1960.

== Geography ==
Currajong Rivulet forms a small part of the northern boundary.

== Infrastructure ==
Route C331 (Nugent Road) enters from the south and runs north-east to an intersection with Route C335 in the centre. Route C335 (Kellevie Road) enters from the south-east and runs north-west to the same intersection, from where it continues north-west as Nugent Road until it exits. Nugent Road runs from Sorell to Buckland, and Kellevie Road passes near Kellevie immediately before entering Nugent.
