= Sorell Council =

- Local government area
- Interactive map of Sorell Council
- Coordinates: 42.7808°S 147.6904°E
- Country: Australia
- State: Tasmania
- Region: Sorell and surrounds
- Established: 1 January 1862
- Council seat: Sorell

Government
  - Mayor: Janet Gatehouse
  - State electorate: Lyons
  - Federal division: Lyons

Area
  - Total: 584 km^{2} (225 sq mi)

Population
  - Total: 16,734 (2021)
  - Density: 28.654/km^{2} (74.21/sq mi)
- Website: Sorell Council
LGAs around Sorell Council
Southern Midlands	Glamorgan Spring Bay	Glamorgan Spring Bay
Clarence	Sorell Council	Tasman Sea
Clarence	Frederick Henry Bay	Tasman

Sorell Council is a local government body in Tasmania, situated in the south-east of the state. The Sorell local government area is classified as rural and has a population of 15,218. The major centres of the region include Dodges Ferry, Dunalley, Primrose Sands and the principal town of Sorell.

== History and attributes ==
The Sorell Municipal Council was established on 1 January 1862, and the first council elected 26 March 1862. Sorell is classified as rural, agricultural and very large under the Australian Classification of Local Governments.

Sorell was historically divided from Hobart, and relied on ferry transport until the construction of a causeway in 1872.

Marion Bay, on the council's east coast, was home to the Tasmanian Falls Festival, an annual music and arts festival held every New Year's Eve for 17 years between 2003 - 2019. Due to impacts of the COVID-19 pandemic, the festival did not continue beyond its 17th year.

== Mayors ==
Past mayors of Sorell Council include:

- Carmel Torenius (1994–1999)
- Kerry Degrassi (1999–2000)
- Carmel Torenius (2000–2012)
- Kerry Vincent (2012–2024)
- Janet Gatehouse (2024–present)

== Councillors ==
The most recent election for the Sorell Council was conducted in 2022. As of 2024, the council consists of the following elected members:

Name	Position	Party affiliation
Janet Gatehouse	Mayor	Independent
Charles Wooley	Deputy Mayor	Independent
Shannon Campbell	Councillor	Independent
Michael Larkins	Councillor	Independent
Marisol Miró Quesada Le Roux	Councillor	Independent
Beth Nichols	Councillor	Independent
Melinda Reed	Councillor	Independent
Natham Reynolds	Councillor	Independent
Carmel Torenius	Councillor	Independent

== Suburbs ==
Suburb	Census population 2021	Reason
Shark Point		Included in Penna
Midway Point	3384	
Penna	437	
Sorell	3597	
Forcett	1102	
Lewisham	799	
Dodges Ferry	2646	
Carlton	1363	
Primrose Sands	1209	
Carlton River	347	
Connellys Marsh	40	
Dunalley	333	
Boomer Bay	117	
Marion Bay	56	
Bream Creek	126	
Nugent	117	
Wattle Hill	176	
Pawleena	112	
Orielton	430	
Copping	200	
Kellevie	185	
Total	16,776	
	(42)	Variance
Local government total	16,734	Gazetted Sorell Council local government area

== See also ==
- List of local government areas of Tasmania
