= Murdunna =

- Town
- Coordinates: 42°57′S 147°52′E
- Country: Australia
- State: Tasmania
- Region: South-east
- LGA: Tasman Council
- Location: 36 km (22 mi) NE of Nubeena

Government
  - State electorate: Lyons
  - Federal division: Lyons

Population
  - Total: 309 (2016 census)
- Postcode: 7178
Localities around Murdunna
Norfolk Bay	Dunalley	Tasman Sea
Norfolk Bay	Murdunna	Tasman Sea
Norfolk Bay	Eaglehawk Neck	Tasman Sea

Murdunna is a small town at the head of King George Sound, a narrow bay opening off Norfolk Bay. Murdunna is approximately halfway down the Forestier Peninsula on the Arthur Highway to Port Arthur. It is around 6 metres (20 feet) above sea level.

Population increases in the summer months, and it is becoming increasingly popular with people from Hobart who are looking for weekend getaways. Many houses are owned by non-residents who use them as holiday homes. The name Murdunna is believed to come from a local Aboriginal word meaning "place of the stars".

Tourism is a major source of income, although forestry was and still continues to be a major employer. Many inhabitants commute to Hobart on a daily basis with improved roads.

Recreation is centred on Sommers Bay, about 5 km (3.1 mi) west of Murdunna itself.

== History ==
In the 1930s Murdanna hosted a semaphore station, used for communication between Hobart and the penal settlement of Port Arthur. It also hosted a slaughterhouse which provided rations for the convicts.

Murdunna Post Office opened on 1 June 1910 and closed in 1969.

== Locality ==
Murdunna is also the name of a rural locality as part of the Tasman Council which encompasses the town. It was gazetted as a locality in 1967. The 2016 census recorded a population of 309 for the state suburb of Murdunna. The waters of the Tasman Sea form the eastern boundary, and Norfolk Bay the western.

== Road infrastructure ==
Route A9 (Arthur Highway) runs through the town from north-west to south.
