= Dodges Ferry =

- Town
- Interactive map of Dodges Ferry
- Coordinates: 42°51′S 147°37′E
- Country: Australia
- State: Tasmania
- Region: South-east
- City: Hobart
- LGA: Sorell Council
- Location: 37 km (23 mi) E of Hobart; 13 km (8.1 mi) SE of Sorell

Government
  - State electorate: Lyons
  - Federal division: Lyons

Population
  - Total: 2,467 (2016 census)
- Postcode: 7173
Localities around Dodges Ferry
Lewisham	Forcett	Forcett
Frederick Henry Bay	Dodges Ferry	Carlton
Frederick Henry Bay	Frederick Henry Bay	Carlton

Dodges Ferry is a rural town in southern Tasmania about 13 kilometres (8.1 mi) south-east of Sorell and sitting on the northern edge of Frederick Henry Bay. The 2016 census recorded a population of 2467 for the state suburb of Dodges Ferry.

== History ==
Located on the eastern side of the entrance to Pittwater estuary it was named after Ralph Dodge (1791-1871) who operated a ferry service across Pitt Water from the 1820s.

In the 1930s "Pappy" Reardon subdivided the surrounding land and it became a popular shack town, with most homeowners temporarily visiting over the holidays. It has a reputation for beautiful beaches (Frederick Henry Bay, Tiger Head Beach, Red Ochre Beach, Carlton Beach, Okines Beach), safe swimming areas, fishing, boating and a popular surf beach Park beach.

Since the 1960s Dodges Ferry has had a steady influx of permanent residents, changing from a holiday shack town to a residential town with newer facilities. At the 2016 census, Dodges Ferry had a population of 2,467.

Dodges Ferry was gazetted as a locality in 1966, and proclaimed a town in 1988.

== Road infrastructure ==
Route C334 (Old Forcett Road / Carlton River Road) runs through from north-west to east.

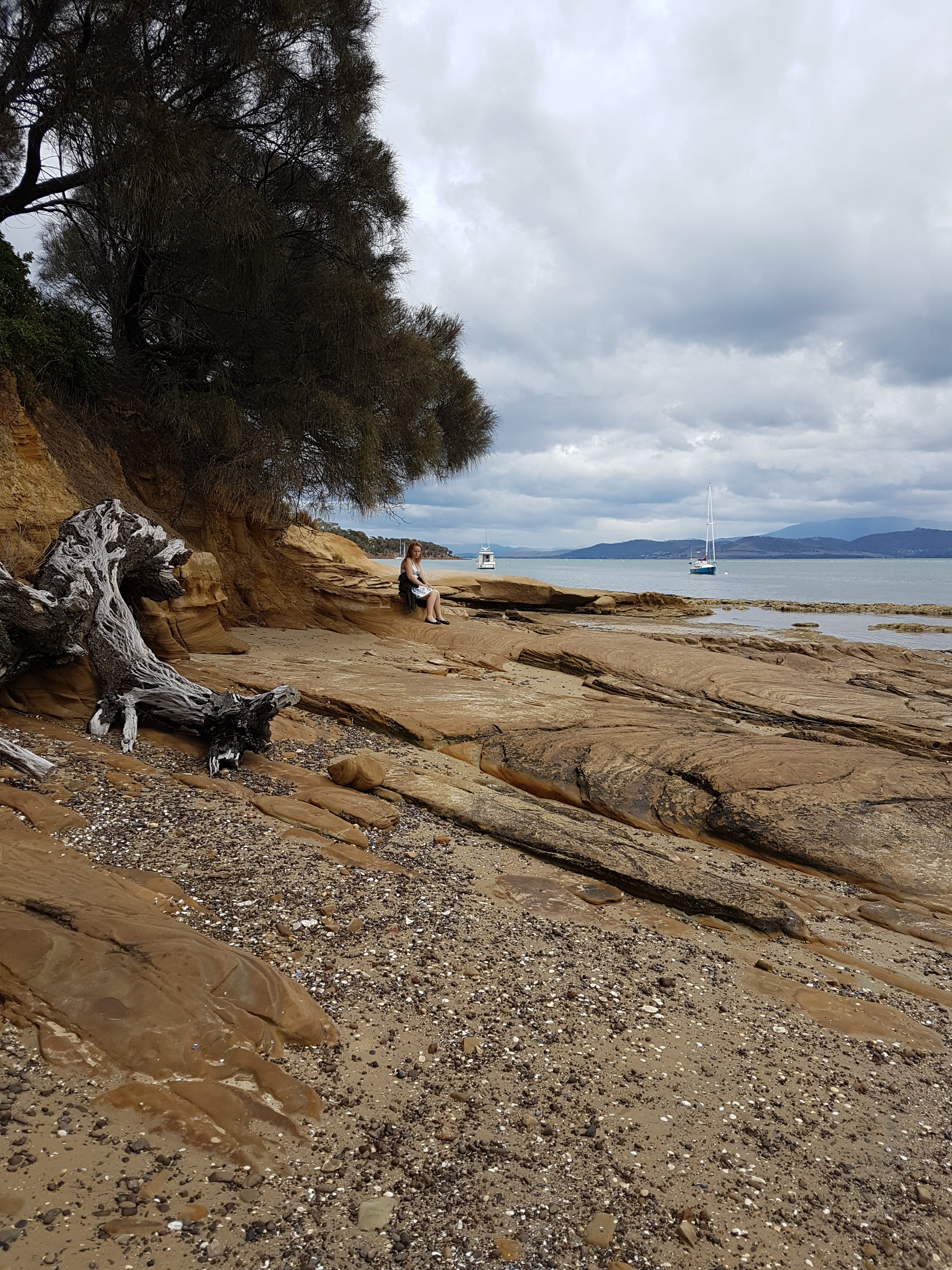
Sandstone rocks on Okines Beach

== Gallery ==
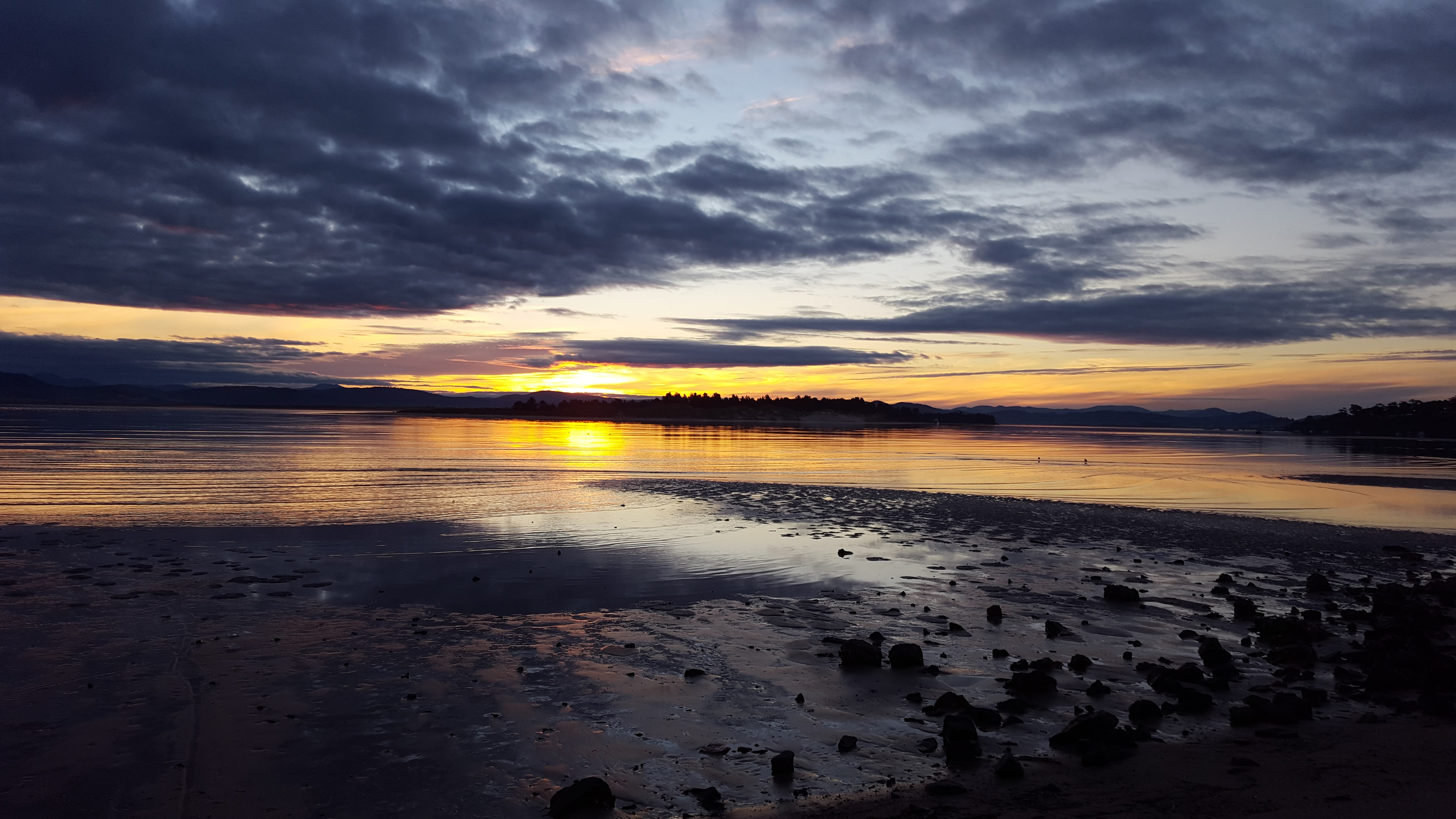
Okines beach

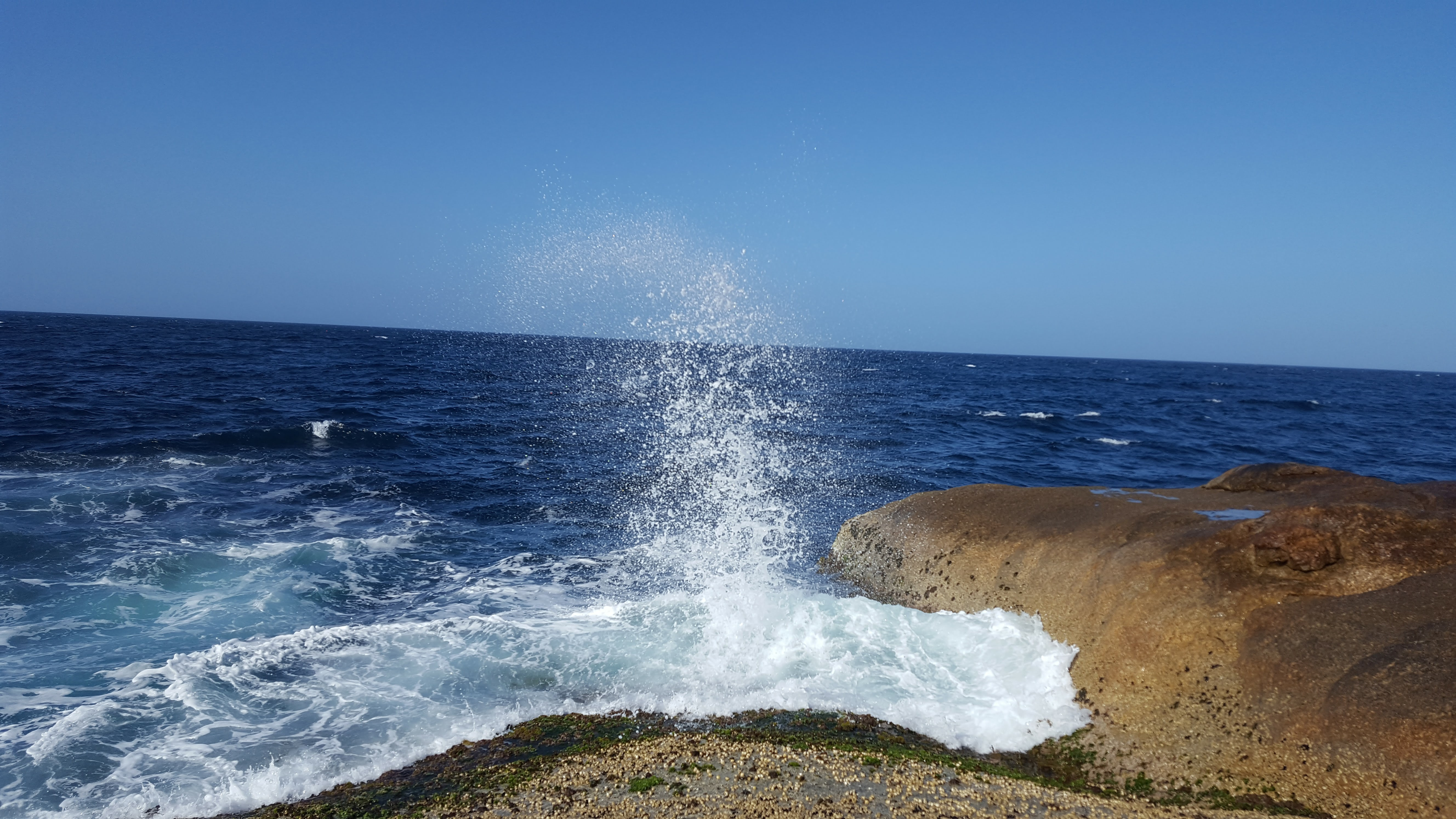
Okines beach water spray

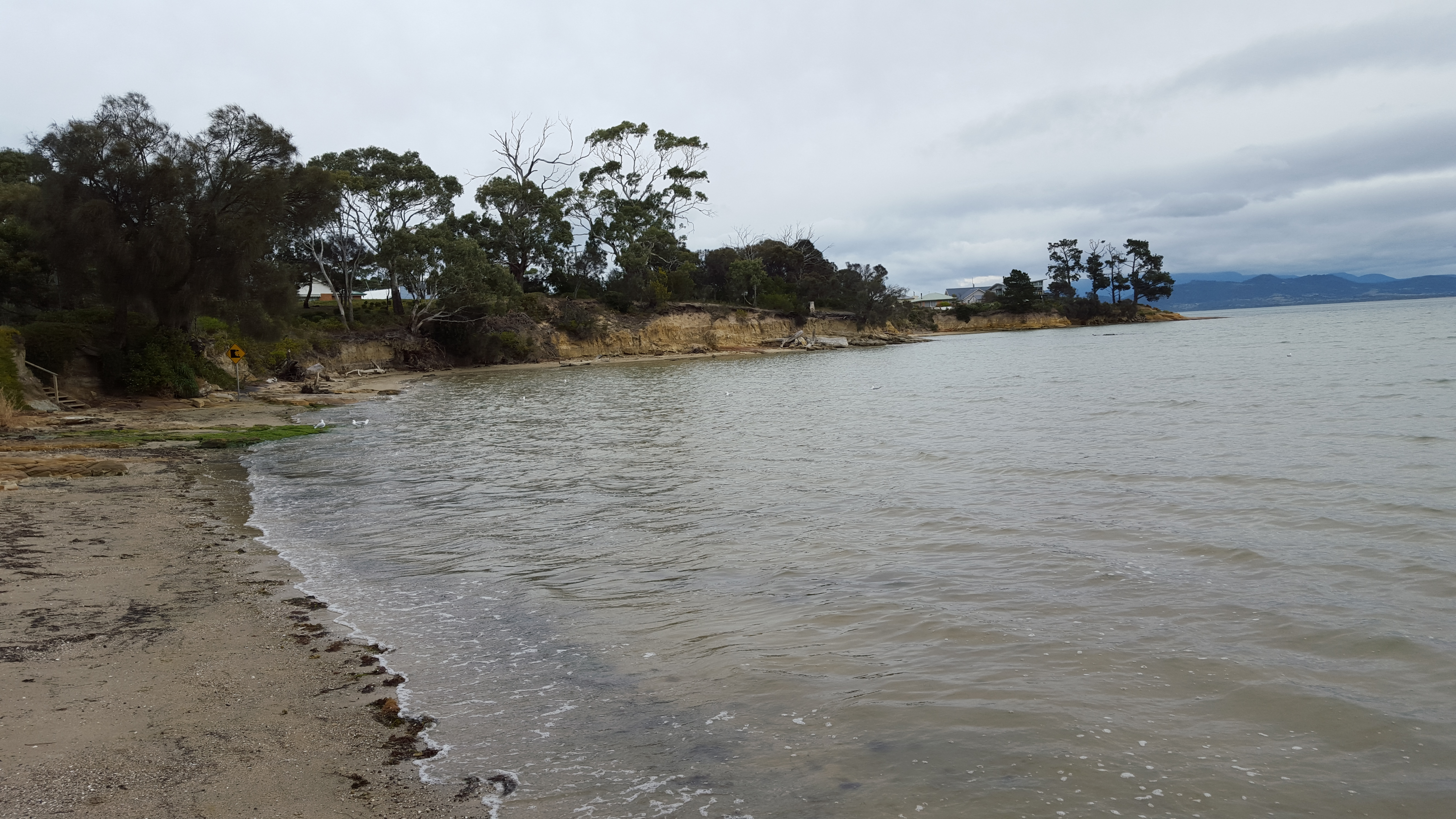
Okines Beach

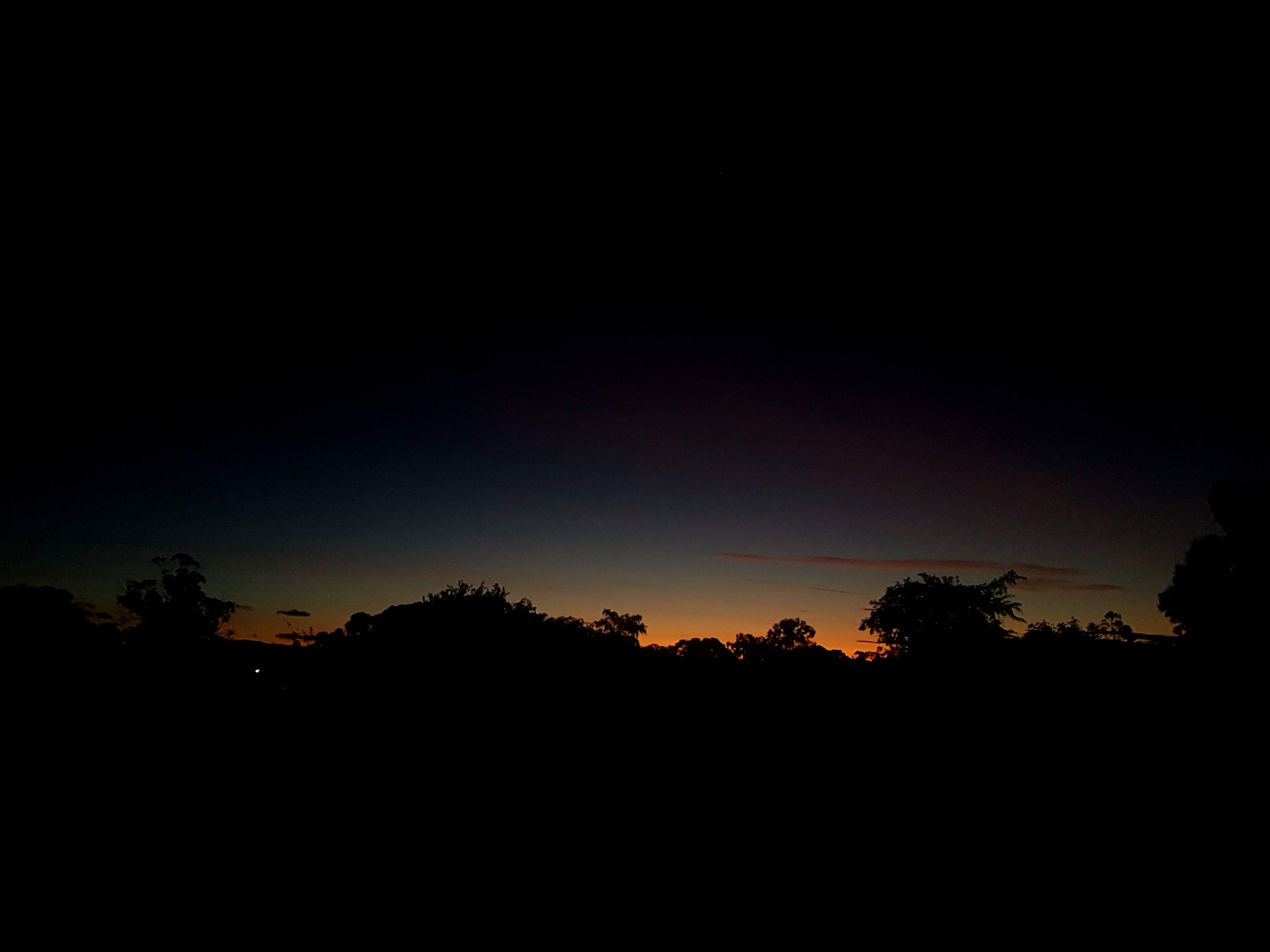
Night falling in Dodges Ferry

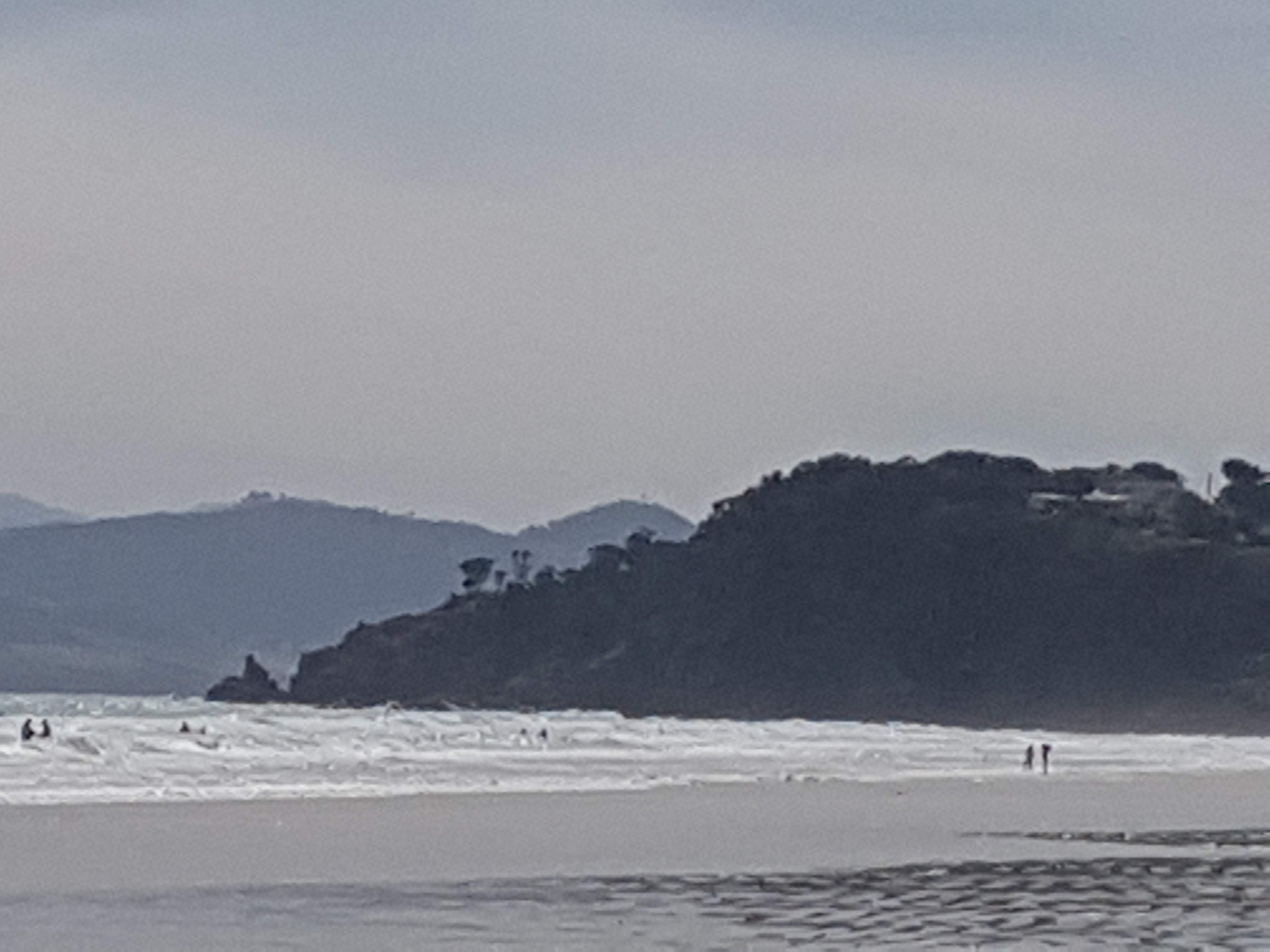
Foggy days on Okines Beach

== See also ==
- Dodges Ferry Football Club
- Sorell Council
