= Kellevie =

- Town
- Coordinates: 42°46′00″S 147°48′00″E
- Country: Australia
- State: Tasmania
- Region: South-east
- LGA: Sorell
- Location: 28 km (17 mi) E of Sorell

Government
  - State electorate: Lyons
  - Federal division: Lyons

Population
  - Total: 164 (2016 census)
- Postcode: 7176
Localities around Kellevie
Nugent	Buckland	Rheban
Nugent	Kellevie	Bream Creek
Forcett	Copping	Bream Creek

Kellevie is a rural locality in the local government area (LGA) of Sorell in the South-east LGA region of Tasmania. The locality is about 28 kilometres (17 mi) east of the town of Sorell. The 2016 census recorded a population of 164 for the state suburb of Kellevie.

== History ==
Kellevie was gazetted as a locality in 1972.

Upper Carlton Post Office opened on 1 January 1874, was renamed Kellevie in 1886 and closed in 1968.

== Geography ==
The Carlton River flows through from north-west to south.

== Road infrastructure ==
Route C335 (Kellevie Road) enters from the south and runs through to the north-west, where it exits. Route C336 (Bream Creek Road) starts at an intersection with Route C335 and runs north-east until it exits.
