= Copping, Tasmania =

Copping
- Town
- Coordinates: 42°49′30″S 147°47′59″E
- Country: Australia
- State: Tasmania
- Region: South-east
- LGA: Sorell
- Location: 22 km (14 mi) SE of Sorell

Government
  - State electorate: Lyons
  - Federal division: Lyons

Population
  - Total: 183 (2016 census)
- Postcode: 7174
Localities around Copping
Kellevie	Kellevie	Bream Creek
Forcett, Carlton River	Copping	Bream Creek, Boomer Bay
Carlton River	Dunalley, Carlton River	Boomer Bay

Copping is a rural locality in the local government area of Sorell in the South-east region of Tasmania. The locality is about 22 kilometres (14 mi) south-east of the town of Sorell. The 2016 census recorded a population of 183 for the state suburb of Copping.

== History ==
Copping was gazetted as a locality in 1968.

Part of the Bream Creek district, it was named after Captain Richard Copping, who purchased a property here from George Moore in 1860 upon which he settled three of his half-brothers as tenant farmers. Captain Copping established his own property Rochford Hall nearby at Kellevie.

Copping Post Office opened on 1 October 1886 and closed in 1988.

Copping gained notoriety when it was revealed that Martin Bryant lived there for a number of years in the 1990s.

Properties were destroyed in Copping during bushfires in January 2013.

== Geography ==
Most of the boundaries of the locality are survey lines. The Carlton River flows through from north-west to south-west.

== Road infrastructure ==
The A9 route (Arthur Highway) enters from the west and runs through to the south-east, where it exits. Route C335 (Kellevie Road) starts at an intersection with A9 and runs north until it exits. Route C337 (Marion Bay Road) starts at an intersection with A9 and runs east until it exits.
