= Marion Bay, Tasmania =

Marion Bay Hobart, Tasmania
- Coordinates: 42°47′49″S 147°55′23″E
- Population: 72 (2016 census)
- Postcode(s): 7175
- Location: 27 km (17 mi) E of Sorell; 52 km (32 mi) E of Hobart
- LGA(s): Sorell
- Region: South-east
- State electorate(s): Lyons
- Federal division(s): Lyons
Suburbs around Marion Bay:
Bream Creek	Bream Creek	Marion Bay
Bream Creek	Marion Bay	Marion Bay
Boomer Bay	Blackman Bay	Blackman Bay

Marion Bay is a rural / residential locality in the local government area (LGA) of Sorell in the South-east LGA region of Tasmania. The locality is about 27 kilometres (17 mi) east of the town of Sorell. The 2016 census recorded a population of 72 for the state suburb of Marion Bay. Marion Bay is also a large bay on the south-east coast of Tasmania. Its south-western shore is contained by the Marion Bay Important Bird Area.

== History ==
Marion Bay is a confirmed locality.

=== European discovery ===
Abel Tasman first anchored just north of a small island in the southern part of this large bay in 1642, and landed in the area he named Frederick Henricx Bay (made up of what is now called Blackman Bay, Marion Bay and North Bay). The name Frederick Henry Bay was mistakenly moved to its present location by Captain Tobias Furneaux. Subsequently, Frederick Henricx Bay was later named Marion Bay after the Breton navigator Marion du Fresne, who arrived in his ship Mascarin with Marquis de Castries in March 1772. Marion recorded that "One sailor found numbers of crayfish, lobsters and huge crabs, and the oysters there are good and abundant".

Marion's landing is the first recorded sighting and description of the Aboriginal people of Tasmania/lutruwita by Europeans. One of the Aboriginal men was shot dead by Marion's men after the Aboriginals turned on them. Marion then sailed to New Zealand where he was killed by Māori in the Bay of Islands.

== Geography ==
The waters of Blackman Bay and Marion Bay form the eastern to southern boundaries.

== Road infrastructure ==
Route C337 (Marion Bay Road) runs through from west to south.

== Festivals ==
Marion Bay was home to the Tasmanian edition of the Falls Festival, first held in December 2003. The Marion Bay Festival was the second Falls Festival location, after Lorne, Victoria commenced in 1993. It became an annual New Year's Eve event, being held for 17 years until 2019, when COVID-19 led to the festival's postponement, and ultimately cancellation. The Festival was run simultaneously alongside other Falls Festivals held in Lorne, Victoria and Byron Bay, New South Wales, with the Byron Bay festival commencing in 2013.

The Bream Creek Show has been taking place in Marion Bay for more than a century. Noted for a display of large pumpkins, the show was first hosted in 1897 in the pavilion at Coppington. It is held every year in March and includes rides for children, wood chopping and other family entertainment.

== Army worm infestation ==
In December 2008, an infestation of army worms in Marion Bay was reported in the national media. Despite the problems residents encountered, infestations of this sort are apparently common wherever the worms are. In October 2008 a general alert was sounded that such an infestation was likely to occur.
