= Blackman Bay, Tasmania =

Bay in south east of Tasmania, Australia

Coordinates: 42.860°S 147.861°E

Blackman Bay is located on the south-east coast of Tasmania. It extends from the bay's inlet at the southern peninsula of Marion Bay to the village of Dunalley. Historically this bay was referred to as "Frederick Henry Bay".
