= Frederick Henry Bay =

Bay in Tasmania, Australia

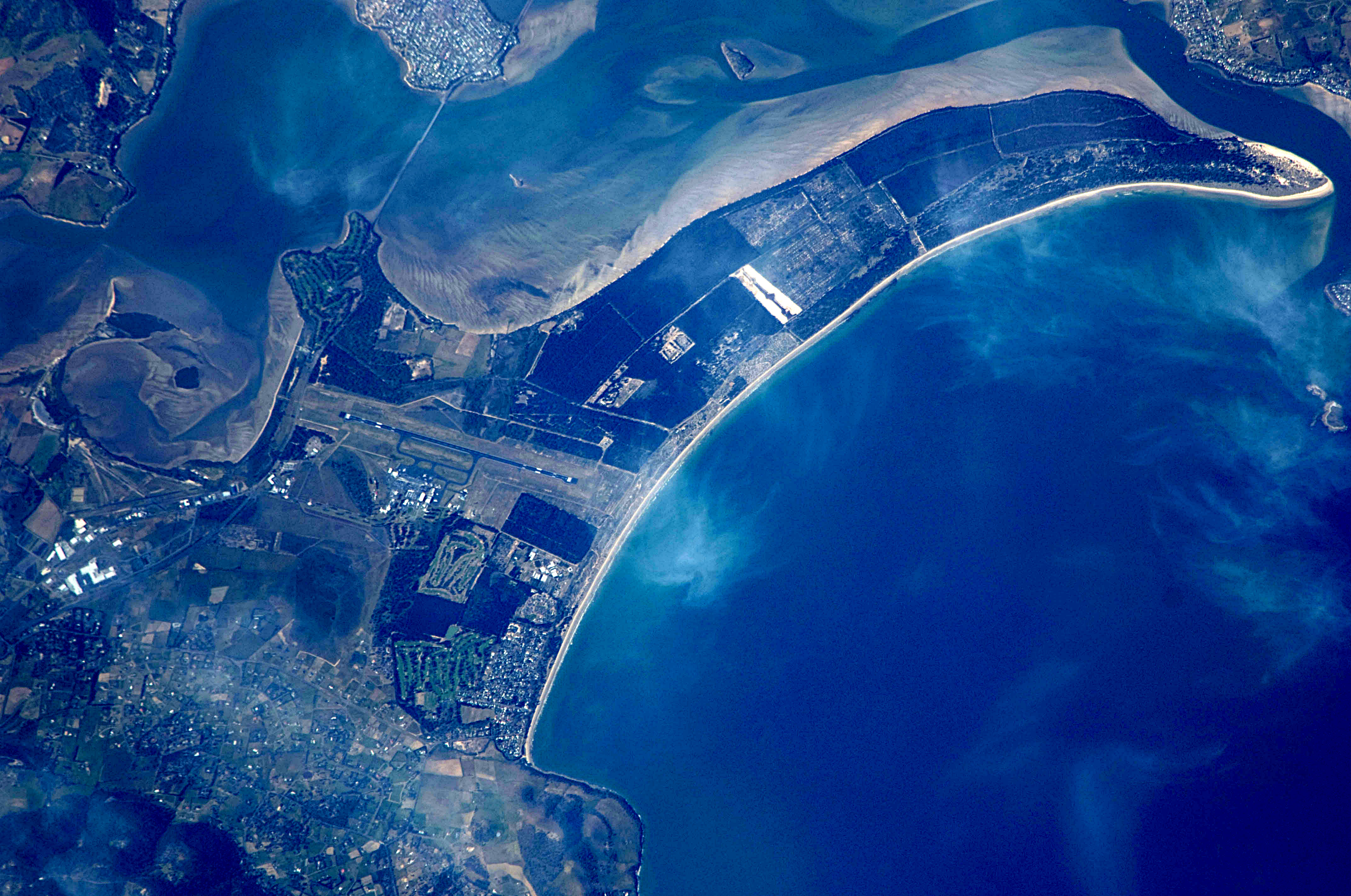

- Location in Tasmania
- Coordinates: 42°55′26″S 147°36′33″E
- Type: Bay
- Basin countries: Australia

Frederick Henry Bay is a body of water in the southeast of Tasmania, Australia. It is located to the east of the South Arm Peninsula, and west of the Tasman Peninsula. Towns on the coast of the bay include Lauderdale, Seven Mile Beach, Dodges Ferry and Primrose Sands. The bay is accessible via Storm Bay from the south, and provides further access to Norfolk Bay to its east.

The bay contains Seven Mile Beach on its northern shores, the closest surfing beach to Hobart.

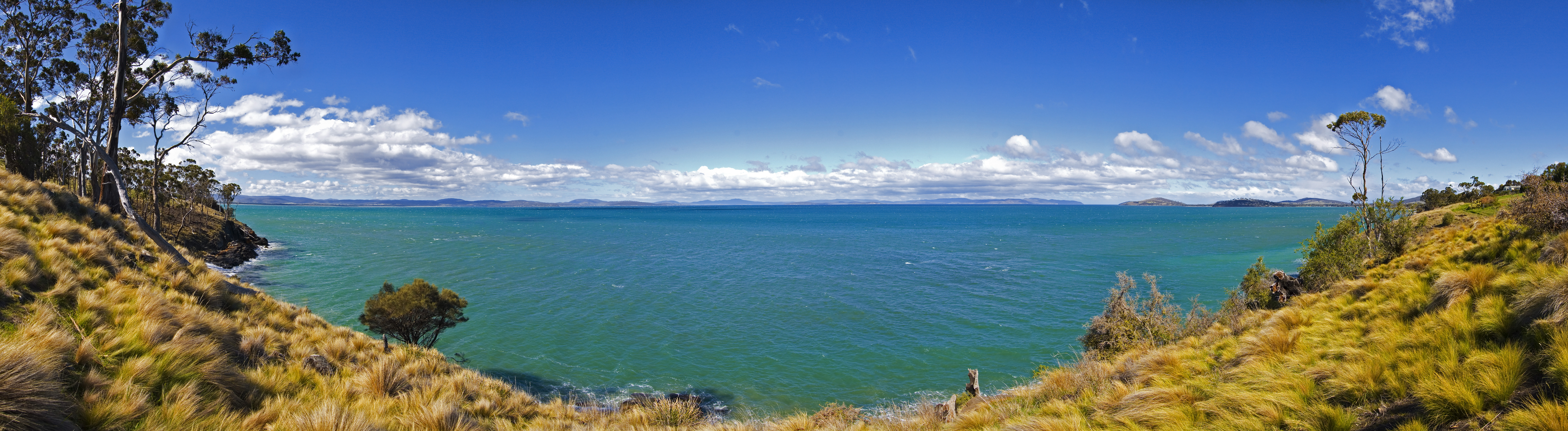
Frederick Henry Bay as seen from Acton Park

== History ==
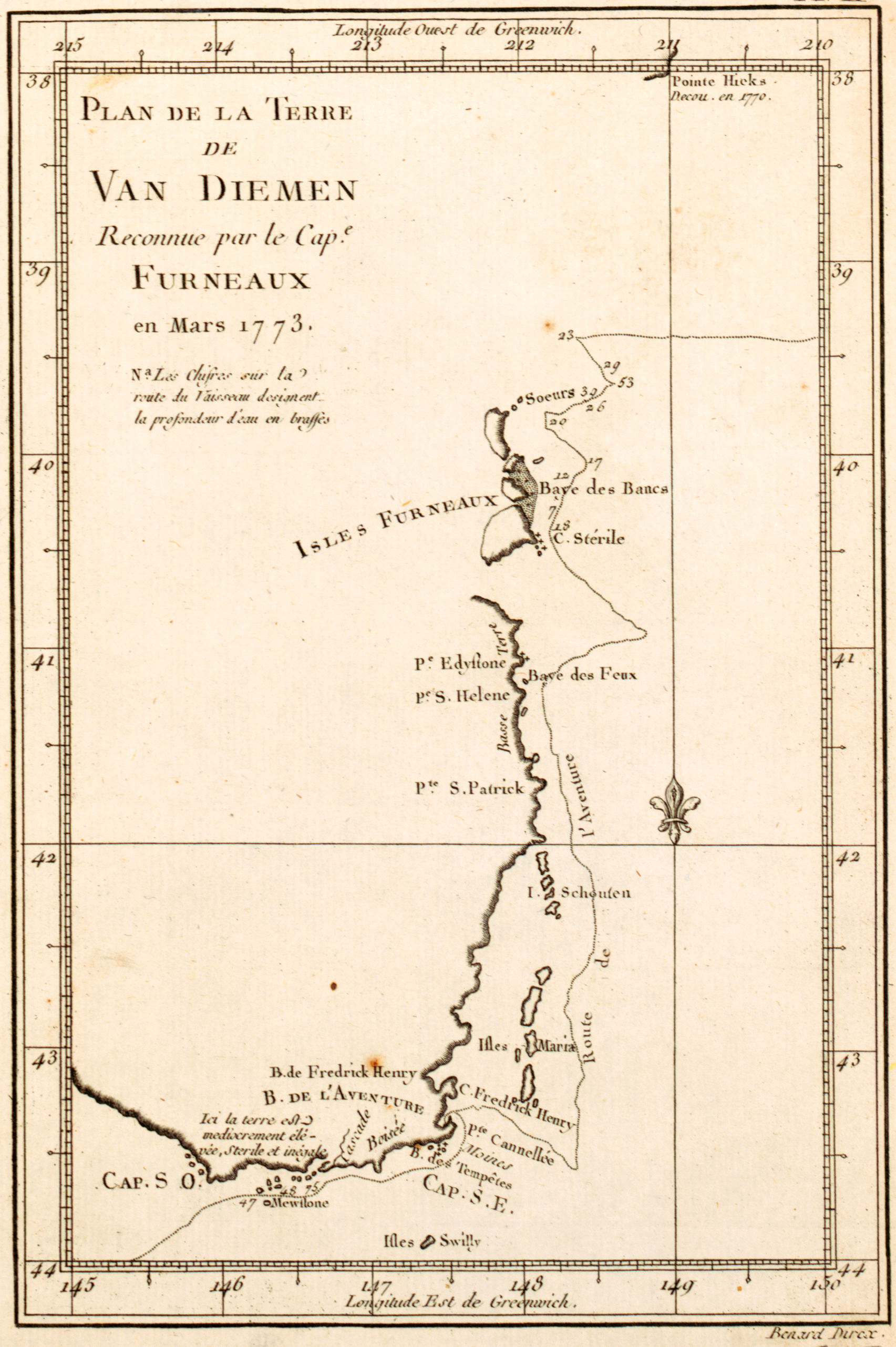
Tobias Furneaux and Robert Bénard, Plan de la Terre de Van Diemen reconnue par le Cape. Furneaux en Mars 1773; from: Jacques Cook, Voyage dans l'Hemisphere austral, et autour du Monde fait sur les Vaisseaux de Roi, 1'Adventure, & la Resolution, en 1772, 1773, 1774 & 1775, Paris, 1778, Pl. 11. nla.gov.au/nla.obj-232573727

It was first named "Baie du Nord" (North Bay) by Bruni d'Entrecasteaux in 1792–93. The original Frederick Henrik Bay (today's Blackman Bay and Marion Bay) was named by Abel Tasman in 1642 after Frederick Henry, Prince of Orange.

In March 1773 Captain Tobias Furneaux, the first Englishman in Tasmanian waters, glimpsed the opening to D'Entrecasteaux Channel, thought that was Storm Bay, then anchored in Adventure Bay thinking he was in the vicinity of North Bay. He erroneously identified the Northern cape of Adventure Bay (today's Cape Queen Elizabeth), as Cape Frederick Henry, and d'Entrecasteaux's North Bay as Tasman's Fredrick Henrik Bay, and recorded these on his map.

This error was also made by Cook and Bligh etc., relying on Furneaux's mapping. Matthew Flinders adjusted his 1814 map, however the name Frederick Henry Bay remained in its present-day location.

Around 1784–85, Henri Peyroux de la Coudreniere wrote a "memoir on the advantages to be gained for the Spanish crown by the settlement of Van Dieman's Land. After receiving no response from the Spanish government, Peyroux proposed it to the French government, as "Mémoire sur les avantages qui résulteraient d'une colonie puissante à la terre de Diémen". He noted that in Frederick Henry Bay, "we find an excellent harbour, where one can anchor in 14 fathoms sheltered from the wind. The country offers an enchanting appearance and the climate is pure and healthy. We read in Cook's voyages that the soil is fertile; it produces the largest and the tallest trees in the world, their trunks are seen to be 90 feet high without any forks". He said it was a particularly favorable site for a base in Van Diemens Land. It was perhaps no coincidence that in his Royal Instructions, D'Entrecasteaux was ordered to investigate the Bay.

Whaling was conducted in the bay, from a shore based station on Sloping Island, starting in 1824.

The bay was identified as a national drowning blackspot in 2008. As a result, surf life savers patrols in the area increased.

== Accidents and incidents ==
On 10 March 1946 a Douglas DC-3 aircraft operated by Australian National Airways departed from Cambridge Aerodrome with a crew of 4 and 21 passengers for Essendon Airport. Less than 2 minutes after take-off the aircraft crashed into Frederick Henry Bay, killing all on board. At the time it was Australia's worst civil aviation accident.
