= Sorell, Tasmania =

Sorell
- Suburb
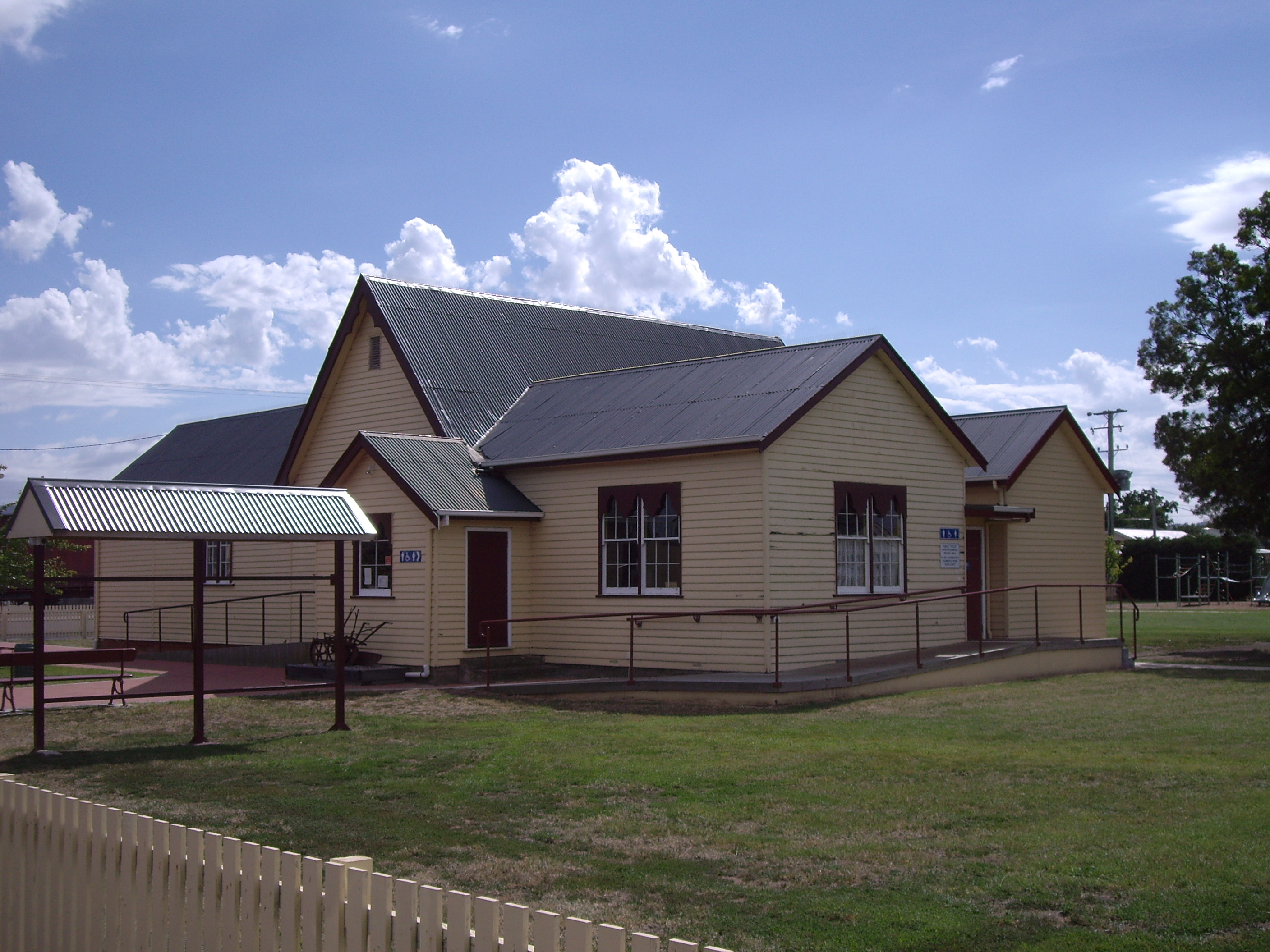
- St George's Parish Hall containing the Tourist Information Centre in 2007 - Gordon Street, Sorell

- Interactive map of Sorell
- Coordinates: 42°47′S 147°34′E
- Country: Australia
- State: Tasmania
- Region: Hobart
- City: Hobart
- LGA: Sorell Council
- Location: 4 km (2.5 mi) from Midway Point; 13 km (8.1 mi) from Richmond; 25 km (16 mi) from Hobart; 31 km (19 mi) from Dunalley; 53 km (33 mi) from Orford
- Established: 1808

Government
  - State electorate: Lyons
  - Federal division: Lyons

Population
  - Total: 3,597 (SAL 2021)
- Postcode: 7172
- Mean max temp: 17.6 °C (63.7 °F)
- Mean min temp: 8.2 °C (46.8 °F)
- Annual rainfall: 495.0 mm (19.49 in)

Sorell is a town in Tasmania, Australia, north-east of Hobart. It is located on the Tasman Highway at the junction with the Arthur Highway. Sorell is one of Tasmania's oldest towns, being first settled in 1808 as a small farming community and becoming an official township in 1821. At the 2021 census, Sorell had a population of 2,476.

== History ==
=== Pre-European colonisation ===
The Mumirimina People of the Oyster Bay Tribe traditionally lived in the Sorell area.

=== 19th century ===
Sorell was first explored by Europeans by a party from Risdon Cove in 1803. This first exploration was done by Lieutenant Governor Collins, who originally named the area Pitt Water after the current Chancellor of the Exchequer. Sorell was later renamed after Lieutenant Governor William Sorell by Governor Lachlan Macquarie on a tour. Fertile land was discovered, and it was first settled in 1808, but remained an isolated farming community until 1821 when the town was established. From 1817 to 1822 the 40th Regiment of Foot was stationed in the Sorell area. In 1830 settlers from Sorell partook in the Black Line.

The Sorell Post Office opened on 1 June 1832. Historically, it was a granary for the colony, and became known as the "granary of Australia." It was known as a major town on the route from Hobart to Port Arthur on the Tasman Peninsula. It was the centre of an agricultural area and an important market town. It is now a dormitory town of Hobart, as well as the seat of the Sorell Council, which was established in 1862.

In 1872 the Sorell Causeway was opened across Pitt Water, considerably shortening the route to Hobart, which otherwise relied on ferries or a route through Richmond. Telegraph service was introduced in 1876 and a railway line from Bellerive opened in 1892.

=== 20th century ===
Sorell gained a water supply in 1916 and was electrified in 1930.

Sorell was affected by the 1967 Tasmanian fires. The fires claimed at least six lives in Sorell, and destroyed the Sorell Racecourse Ground.

=== 21st century ===
In 2015 Sorell Council recognised the Mumirimina People as the traditional owners of the Sorell district, and an aboriginal flag was flown permanently at the entrance to Sorell Council since 2020.

== Infrastructure ==
Sorell is served by Sorell School, the oldest continually operating public school in Australia, opened in 1821. It is a co-educational primary and secondary school, serving years K–12. Sorell is served by a Libraries Tasmania library, a Service Tasmania office, and Australia Post Office.

Sorell Plaza shopping centre, built in the mid 2000s, provides a supermarket and other major retail outlets. It was purchased by SCA Property Group, a subsidiary of Woolworths, in 2019. Gateway Shopping Centre includes a competing supermarket and small retail.

Sorell has a number of historic buildings, including the Sorell Barracks, constructed to house soldiers during the Black War. These and other historic buildings - including the railway house, the old Sorell Library (now an antiques centre), and the Gordon Highlander Hotel, form a heritage walk. The area also has a local historical society as well as a Freemasons Lodge (Lodge Pembroke).

A 24 kilometre railway line from Bellerive opened in May 1892. It closed in June 1926.

== Culture ==
=== Religion ===
Sorell falls within the Anglican Parish of South East Tasmania, based at St George's Church, and the Catholic parish of St. John's, Richmond, with services at St Thomas's Church. Historically, the town was also served by the Presbyterian Scots Church, designed by James Blackburn, which is now a private residence.

=== Sport ===
The primary sporting ground in Sorell is Pembroke Park. The Sorell Eagles are the local Australian rules football team, they compete in the SFL Community League.

== Climate ==
Sorell has an oceanic climate (Köppen: Cfb), with very mild summers and cool winters. Average maxima vary from 22.7 °C (72.9 °F) in January to 12.6 °C (54.7 °F) in July while average minima fluctuate between 12.2 °C (54.0 °F) in January and 4.2 °C (39.6 °F) in July. Mean average annual precipitation is rather low, 495.0 mm (19.49 in), but is rather frequent (spread across 139.5 precipitation days above the 1.0 mm (0.039 in) threshold). The town is not very sunny, experiencing 44.8 clear days and 169.1 cloudy days per annum. Extreme temperatures have ranged from 41.4 °C (106.5 °F) on 31 January 2020 to −3.9 °C (25.0 °F) on 23 June 1972. All climate data was sourced from Hobart Airport, which is 7.5 km (4.7 mi) southeast of Sorell.

Climate data for Sorell (42º49'48"S, 147º30'00"E, 4 m AMSL) (1958–2022 normals & extremes)
Month	Jan	Feb	Mar	Apr	May	Jun	Jul	Aug	Sep	Oct	Nov	Dec	Year
Record high °C (°F)	41.4 (106.5)	39.8 (103.6)	38.1 (100.6)	31.8 (89.2)	25.6 (78.1)	19.6 (67.3)	20.4 (68.7)	23.7 (74.7)	31.1 (88.0)	33.4 (92.1)	38.5 (101.3)	40.8 (105.4)	41.4 (106.5)
Mean daily maximum °C (°F)	22.7 (72.9)	22.4 (72.3)	20.9 (69.6)	18.2 (64.8)	15.3 (59.5)	13.0 (55.4)	12.6 (54.7)	13.5 (56.3)	15.5 (59.9)	17.4 (63.3)	19.1 (66.4)	20.8 (69.4)	17.6 (63.7)
Mean daily minimum °C (°F)	12.2 (54.0)	12.1 (53.8)	10.9 (51.6)	8.8 (47.8)	6.7 (44.1)	4.7 (40.5)	4.2 (39.6)	4.7 (40.5)	6.1 (43.0)	7.6 (45.7)	9.3 (48.7)	10.9 (51.6)	8.2 (46.7)
Record low °C (°F)	3.7 (38.7)	3.4 (38.1)	2.2 (36.0)	−0.6 (30.9)	−2.2 (28.0)	−3.9 (25.0)	−3.2 (26.2)	−2.0 (28.4)	−2.3 (27.9)	−1.0 (30.2)	1.7 (35.1)	2.7 (36.9)	−3.9 (25.0)
Average precipitation mm (inches)	40.2 (1.58)	34.9 (1.37)	36.3 (1.43)	40.1 (1.58)	37.3 (1.47)	34.2 (1.35)	41.4 (1.63)	47.2 (1.86)	40.2 (1.58)	47.2 (1.86)	44.3 (1.74)	52.1 (2.05)	495.0 (19.49)
Average precipitation days (≥ 0.2 mm)	9.0	8.2	10.1	10.4	11.4	11.3	13.2	13.9	13.7	13.6	12.8	11.9	139.5
Average afternoon relative humidity (%)	50	51	53	56	61	64	63	60	56	54	53	52	56
Average dew point °C (°F)	9.0 (48.2)	9.5 (49.1)	8.8 (47.8)	7.4 (45.3)	6.3 (43.3)	5.1 (41.2)	4.4 (39.9)	4.3 (39.7)	4.7 (40.5)	5.7 (42.3)	7.0 (44.6)	8.0 (46.4)	6.7 (44.0)
Mean monthly sunshine hours	254.2	223.2	207.7	177.0	145.7	129.0	148.8	176.7	189.0	229.4	222.0	244.9	2,347.6
Percentage possible sunshine	55	57	54	50	49	47	51	55	53	56	51	52	53
Source: Bureau of Meteorology (1958–2022 normals & extremes)

== Gallery ==
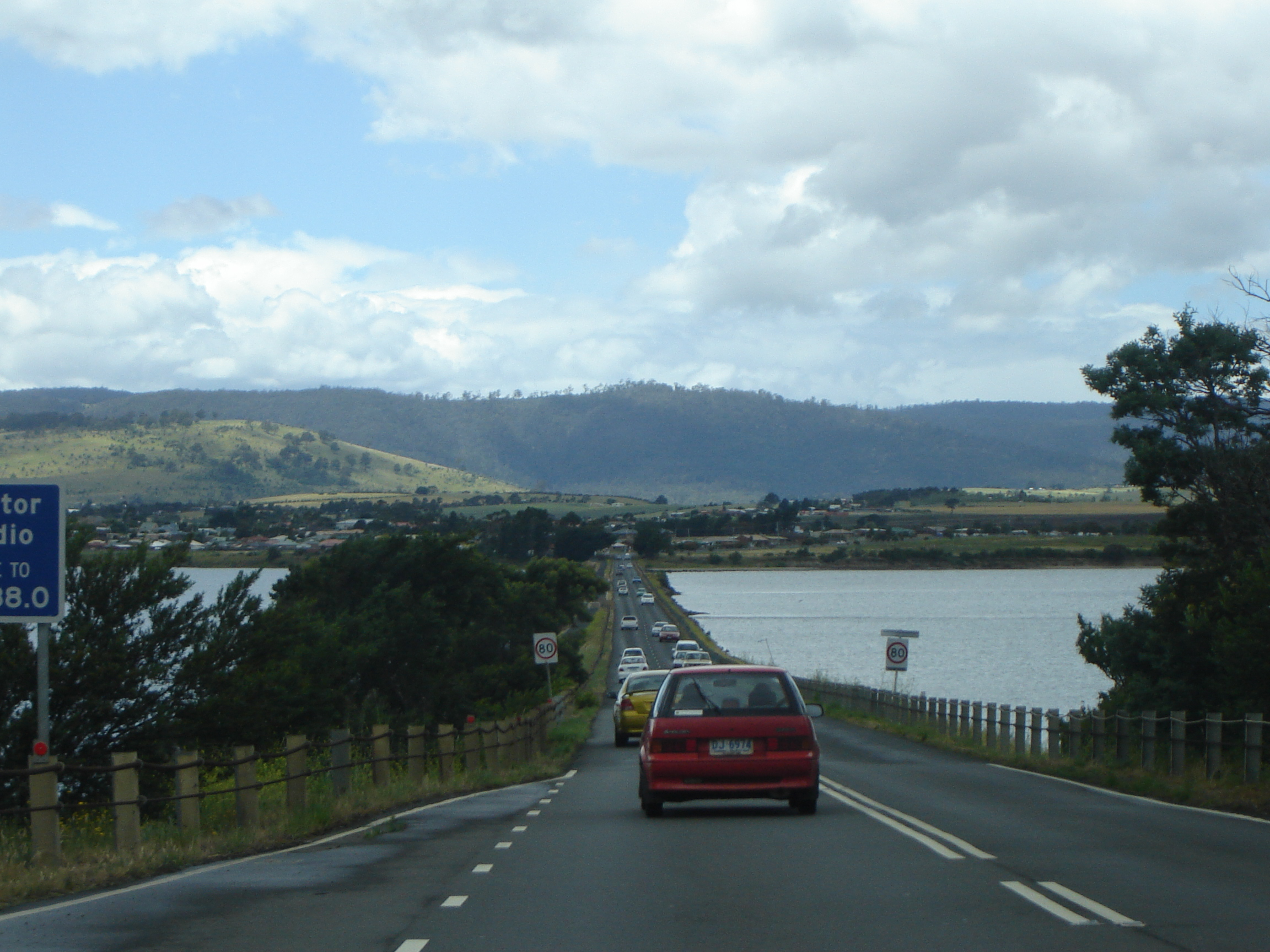
Sorell Causeway

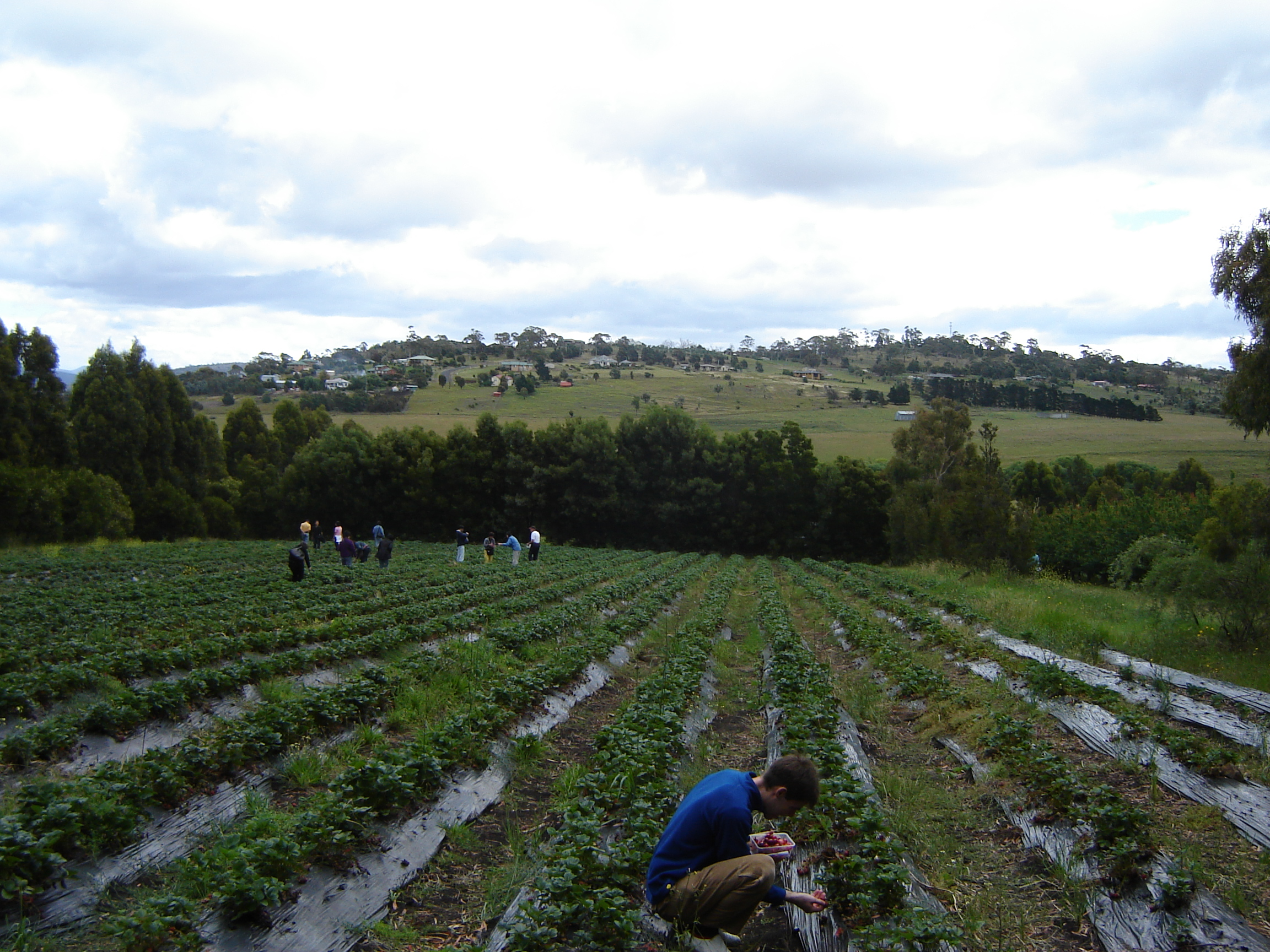
Berry farm near Sorell

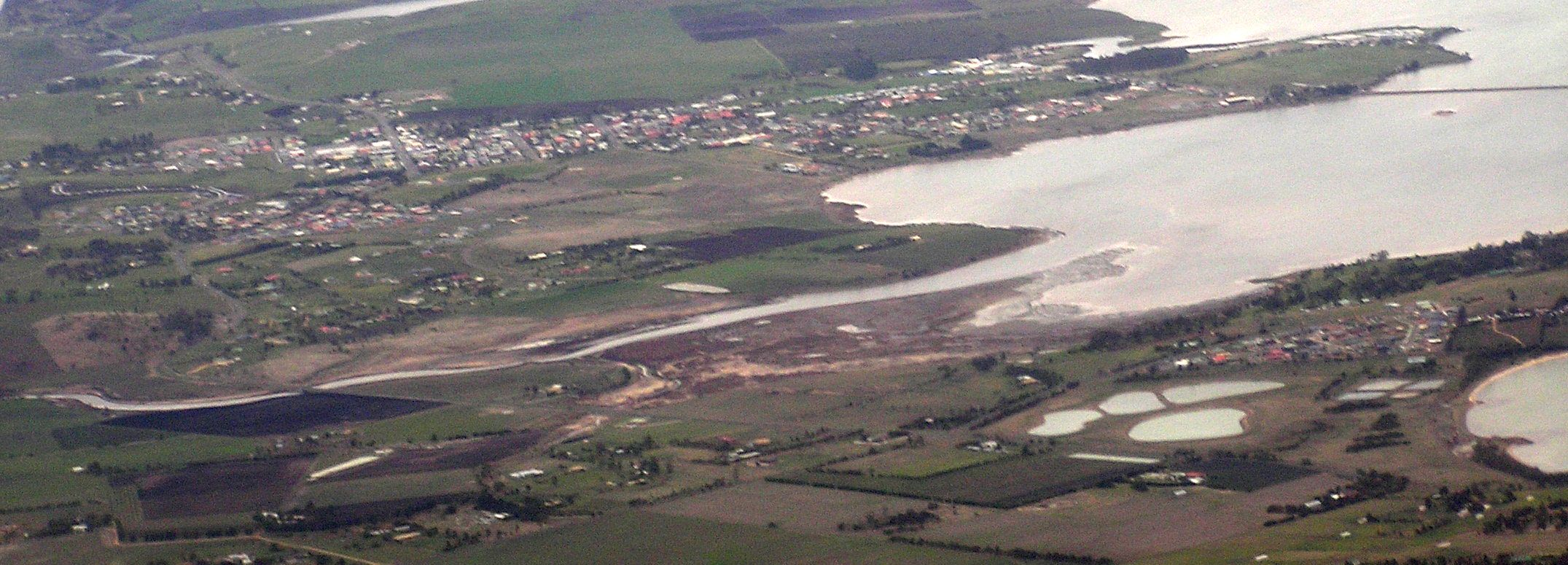
Aerial photo
