= Perth Link Roads =

Road bypass in Tasmania, Australia

Perth Link Roads Tasmania
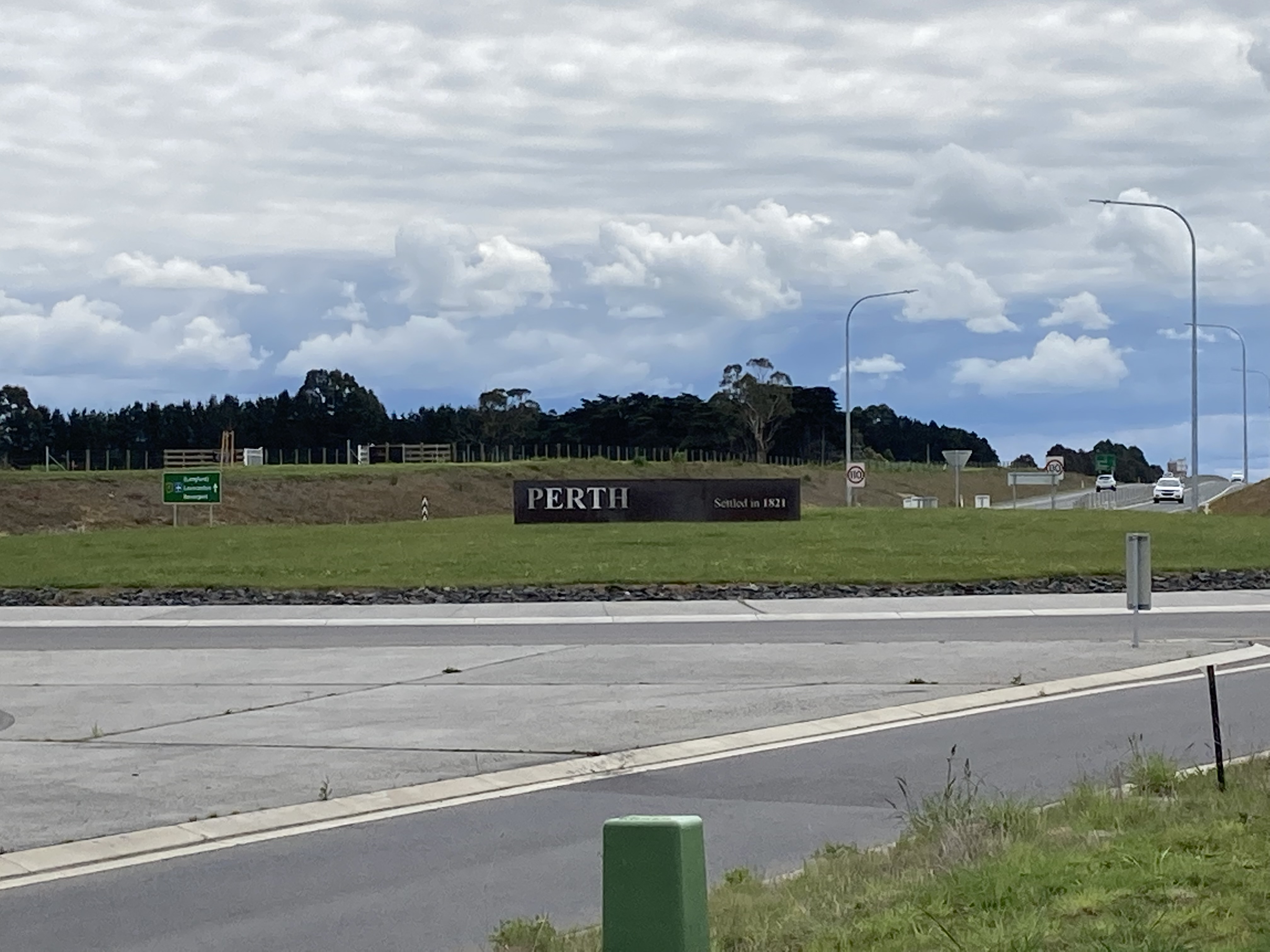
- Entrance to Perth Link Roads near the South Esk River
- Coordinates: 41.5824723°S 147.1780205°E (West end); 41.5218341°S 147.1793217°E (North end)

General information
- Type: Highway
- Length: 8 km (5.0 mi)
- Opened: First stage - 2018; Final stage - June 2020
- Route number(s): National Highway (Perth - Breadalbane)

Major junctions
- West end: Midland Highway (Perth Roundabout)
- Illawarra Road
- North end: Midland Highway Evandale Road Breadalbane

Location(s)
- Region: Midlands
- Major settlements: Perth, Breadalbane

Highway system
- Highways in Australia; National Highway • Freeways in Australia; Highways in Tasmania

Perth Link Roads is a A$92.3 million bypass that carries the Midland Highway in Tasmania. The bypass takes highway traffic, including heavy vehicles, around the western side of Perth instead of through the town centre.

The final stage of the bypass opened in June 2020 near Perth after the first stage of the bypass opened in 2018 at Breadalbane bypassing the roundabout at Breadalbane.

== Route description ==
Perth Link Roads route (red)

The bypass starts at Breadalbane at a trumpet interchange for Evandale Road, where the Launceston Southern Outlet ends. It runs for 4 or 5 kilometres with a few gentle curves to a diamond interchange for Haggerston Road, and then straight on to a second diamond interchange, with two roundabouts, for the main street of Perth. The road curves through an interchange with Illawarra Road and runs for about 1 kilometre through a cutting to a roundabout on the main street of Perth, near the South Esk River, where the bypass ends.

== Exits ==
Location	km	mi	Destinations	Notes	
Northern Midlands	Perth	0	0.0	Midland Highway / Main Road / Eskleigh Road	Roundabout near the South Esk River
Northern Midlands	Perth	2	1.2	Illawarra Road	Semi-directional T interchange
Northern Midlands	Perth	4	2.5	Main Road	Diamond intersection with a roundabout
Northern Midlands	Devon Hills	6.4	4.0	Old Midland Highway	Diamond intersection
Northern Midlands	Breadalbane	8	5.0	Evandale Road	Trumpet interchange
1.000 mi = 1.609 km; 1.000 km = 0.621 mi

== History ==
Originally, the bypass was going to be built for Illawarra Road from the entrance of Perth, near the bridge that crosses the South Esk River which was going to have a speed grade intersection for the Midland Highway. The plan was to replace the already existing route for Illawarra Road which used to go on Drummond Street for truck freight. The plan was not built at all until 2018. In 2017 the Tasmanian Government announced that the bypass will be constructed in 2018 from approval from the Northern Midlands Council. The first stage of the bypass was opened to traffic which bypassed the Breadalbane roundabout with two speed grade intersections and bypasses Devon Hills.

In April 2020, the first stage of the bypass was opened but only went onto Illawarra Road due to the rest of the bypass still being under construction, so drivers would have to go through Perth and then coming out of Perth but going onto two roundabouts before going onto the Southern Outlet. The bypass was completed and opened in June 2020 with a cost of A$92.3 million. A cycling path was built near the main railway line and finishes on Illawarra Road near the interchange for Pateena Road.

== See also ==
- List of bypasses in Tasmania
