= List of bypasses in Tasmania =

A list about bypasses in Tasmania

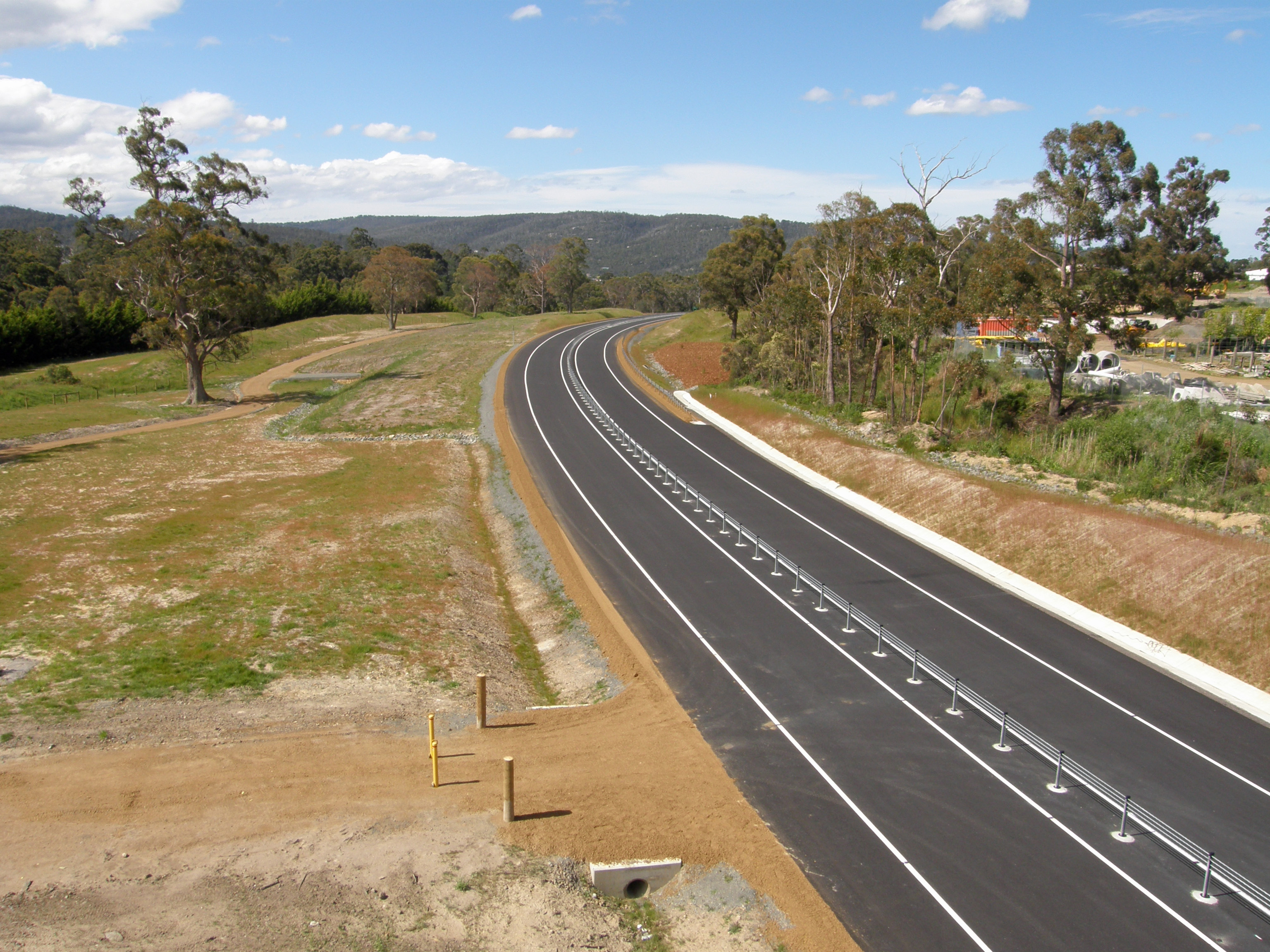
The Kingston Bypass

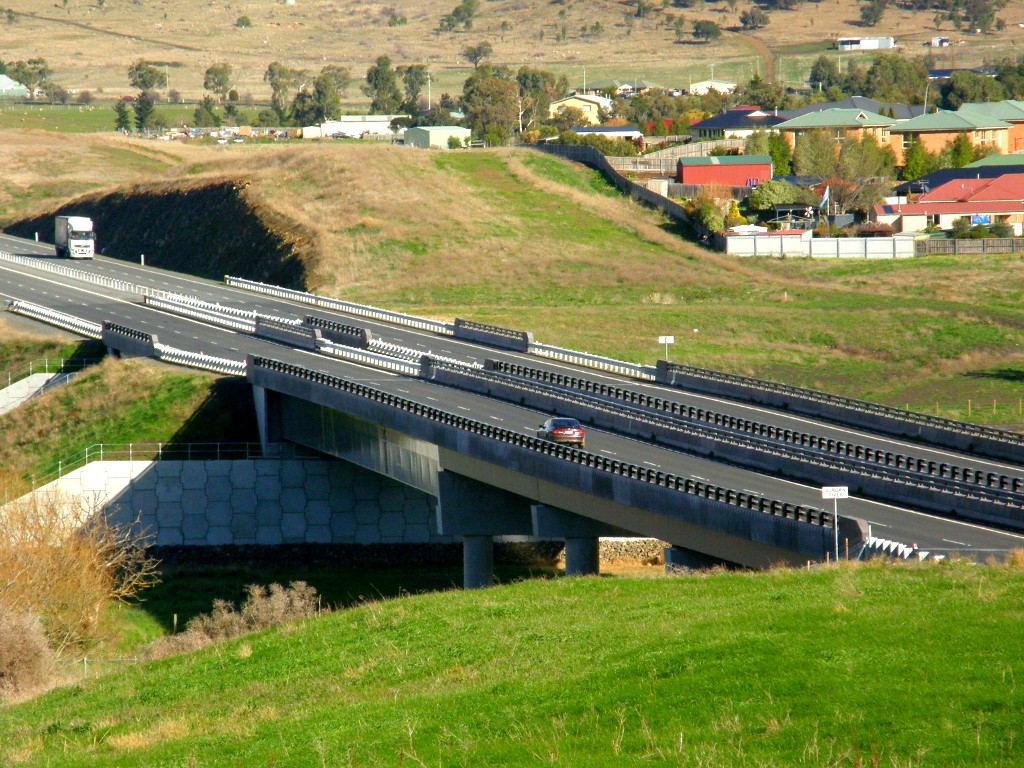
The Brighton Bypass

A bypass is a type of road that was built on empty land. The purpose of a bypass is to reduce traffic coming through a town, suburb or city.Tasmania has a majority of bypasses built over the years with many being on the National Highway 1 route and some being on different route numbers as early as the 1950s.

These bypasses are funded by the Tasmanian and Australian Governments. Most bypasses are built for the National Highway on the Island state while rarely some A or B routes get a bypass in busy areas that need one.

== National Highway ==
=== Midland Highway ===
The Midland Highway (also known as the Midlands Highway) is one of Tasmania's most important roads carrying traffic from Launceston to Hobart. Named after the Midlands region and the Northern and Southern Midlands Councils, the Midland Highway has had a majority of bypasses built between the 1960s to the 2020s.

- Brighton Bypass -
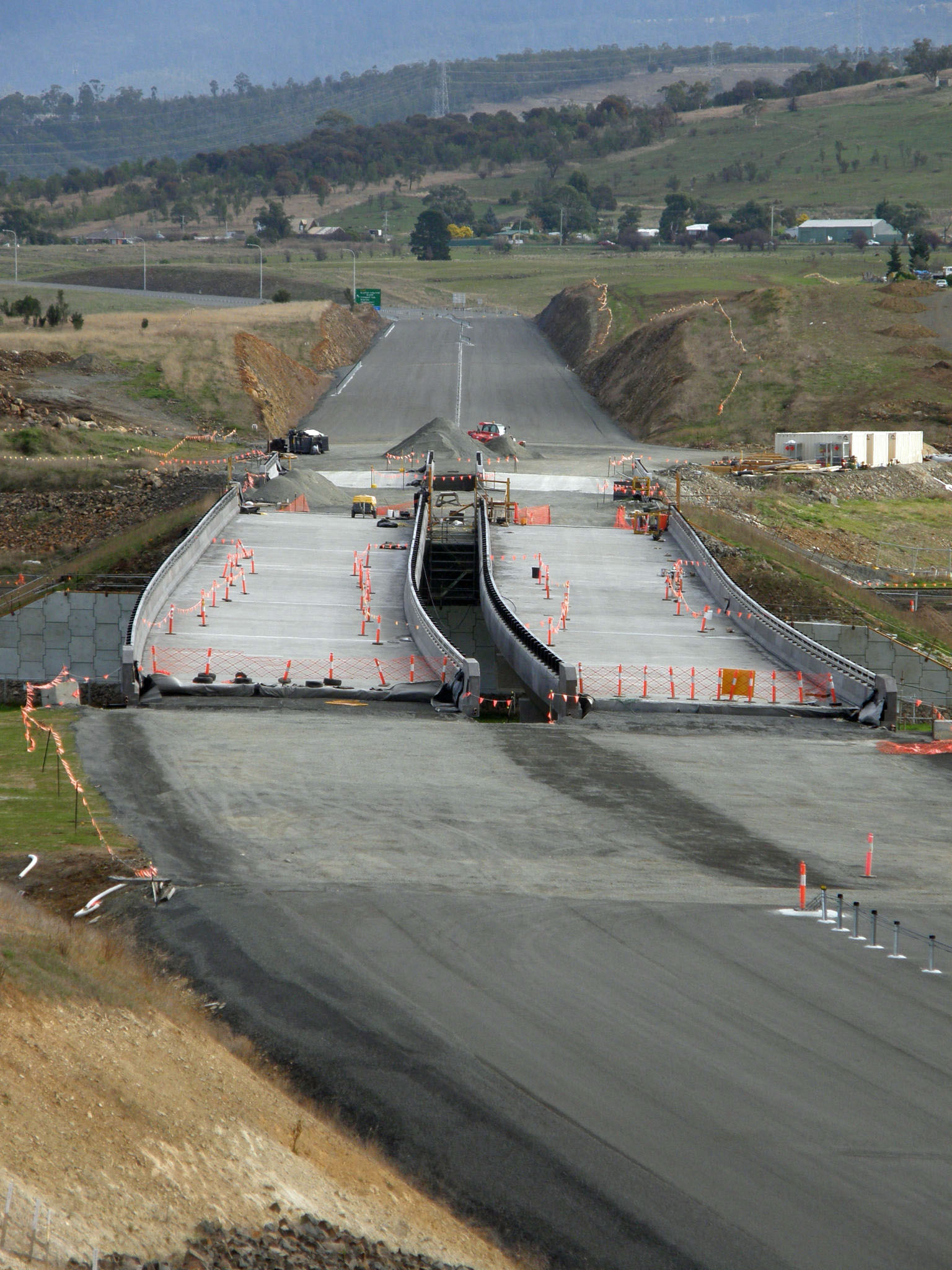
  The Brighton Bypass under construction
  The Brighton Bypass is a dual carriageway bypass that bypasses Brighton. It was built and opened in 2012 with a total cost of A$191 million for the bypass. Construction began in April 2009 and finished on 12 November, 2012. (Note: Brighton Bypass) Protests happened in 2011 due to the bypass going to go over the Jordan River due to Aboriginal sites. To this day the Bypass still remains controversial due to the Tasmanian Government's refusal to properly investigate the proposed road corridor for Aboriginal sites prior to construction.
- Bagdad Bypass - for full information see Former proposed bypasses
- Kempton Bypass - The Kempton Bypass is a two-lane bypass that bypasses the town of Kempton. Built in the 1980s, it is meant to reduce traffic from the town centre of Kempton.
- Melton Mowbray Bypass - Bypass that diverts traffic away from the town centre. It was opened in the 1980s.
- Jericho Bypass - Bypass that diverts traffic away from the town centre of Jericho. The bypass was opened in 1982.
- Oatlands Bypass - Bypass that diverts traffic away from the town centre of Oatlands. The bypass was opened in April 1985.
- Tunbridge Bypass - Directs traffic away from Tunbridge. It opened in 1972.
- Ross Bypass - Bypass that diverts traffic away from the town centre of Ross. The town has being bypassed since 1972.
- Conara Bypass - The highway slightly bypasses the town but diverts traffic away from being in the town centre. It opened in the 1960s connecting the Esk Highway to it.
- Perth Link Roads -
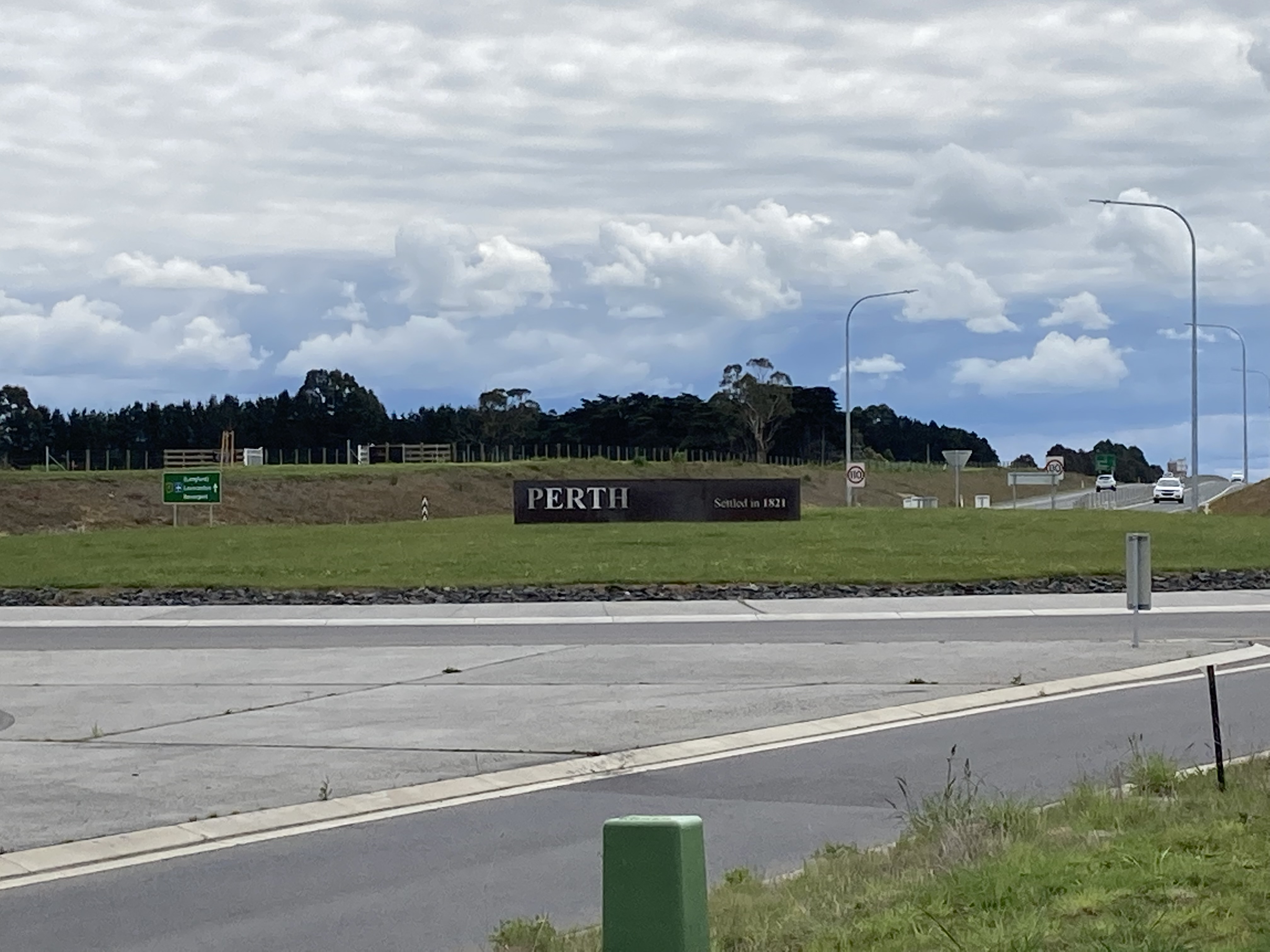
  Perth Link Roads at the Perth Roundabout nearby the South Esk River
  Built in 2020 with a total cost of A$92.3 million, the bypass diverts traffic away from the town centre of Perth from Perth to Breadalbane. The first stage of it opened in 2018 bypassing the Breadalbane roundabout and the old route for the Midland Highway. The final stage opened in June 2020.

=== Bass Highway ===
The Bass Highway is also one of Tasmania's most important roads carrying traffic from Launceston to Burnie. Named after the Bass Strait and for George Bass, over the years the Bass Highway has been redirected to Bypass towns in the Meander Valley region and many road upgrades. Despite using the same Highway name, the highway uses two different route number lables as National Highway 1 and A2.

- Prospect Bypass - Completed in 1988, the bypass bypasses Prospect and Prospect Vale while the Bass Highway had gotten redirected to starting/ending on the Launceston Southern Outlet.
- Hadspen Bypass - Before the Prospect Bypass was built, In the 1970s, Hadspen was bypassed when the Bass Highway used to take the old route where the Meander Valley Road goes onto today. The town is still bypassed but with another bypass.
- Westbury Bypass - Built in 2003, Westbury got bypassed and the Bass Highway's route got redirected again as of currently being the last bypass being built on the Bass Highway.
- Deloraine Bypass - The Deloraine Bypass was opened on 8 June 1990. The project was carried out over five years and cost a total of A$19 million. The bypass opening was performed by the Federal and State ministers for Land Transport and Roads and Transport respectively.
- Devonport Bypass - The bypass was opened in 1977 sort of bypassing the city but has a split like through bypass.
- Ulverstone Bypass/Penguin Bypass - bypassed in August 1980, the Bass Highway was redirected away from the town centre of Ulverstone, and Penguin.

=== Brooker Highway ===
The Brooker Highway is one of Hobart's most used and most busiest Highway's in Tasmania. The Brooker Highway nearly has no bypasses but has a few from Granton to Glenorchy.

== A routes ==
=== Bass Highway ===
Just like the National Highway 1 route, it is also one of Tasmania's most important roads carrying traffic from Burnie to Smithton.

- Wynyard Bypass - Wynyard was bypassed in the 1980s to direct vehicles away from the town centre of Wynyard.
- Smithton Bypass - The Smithton Bypass was built in the late 1980s to direct vehicles away from the town centre.

=== Tasman Highway ===
The Tasman Highway (or A3) is one of Tasmania's most important roads carrying traffic from Hobart to the East Coast then to Launceston. Just like the Midland Highway, it goes from Hobart to Launceston but goes on the east coast. The highway is named after the Tasman Sea and Abel Tasman.

- St Marys Bypass - The Tasman Highway's previous route was redirected from going onto Elephant Pass Road, then into St Marys, then onto St Marys Pass. It replaces the route from going onto Curvey roads and entirely bypassing St Marys. It sort of acts as a bypass but not really as a bypass.

=== Huon Highway ===
The Huon Highway (or A6) is a highway that goes through the Huon Valley and the region which is where the highway gets its name from. Route A6 has been redirected to go onto the Southern Outlet in Hobart.

- Huon Link Road - Built in March 2025, the Huon Link Road is a bypass around the town centre of Huonville designed to reduce congestion on Main Street. It connects Orchard Avenue and the Huon Highway to Flood Road, providing a more direct route for traffic to and from Cygnet.

=== East Tamar Highway ===
The East Tamar Highway is a highway that follows the Tamar River.

- Plans for a high-speed dual carriageway on the East Tamar Highway date back to the 1950s. (Note: Also known as the East Tamar Outlet)
- Dilston Bypass - The Dilston Bypass is a bypass that replaces the old route to Dilston and has overtaking lanes. (Note: Dilston Bypass) The bypass was built in 2011.

==== Arthur Highway ====
The Arthur Highway is a highway that goes to Port Arthur in Tasmania.

- Sorell Southern Bypass -

Sorell Southern Bypass (Red right line)

The Sorell Bypass is a bypass that directs traffic away from the town centre and brings less traffic from drivers who are using the Arthur Highway.

== B routes ==
Most B routes in Tasmania do not have any bypasses unless they are major B route roads.

=== Channel Highway ===
- Kingston Bypass -
  The Kingston Bypass at a Roundabout that connects Algona Road with the Bypass
  The bypass is a A$41 million, 2.8-kilometre-long (1.7 mi) highway bypassing Kingston, Tasmania. The proposal of a bypass was originally published in the Hobart Area Transportation Study during 1965. After the need to such a road was realised several years earlier when the Channel Highway reached an 18,000 AADT. The bypass was opened in 2011.

=== Meander Valley Road ===
Meander Valley Road is a road that follows the Bass Highway. The bass highway used to run on the Meander Valley Road. It used to be called Meander Valley Highway but was renamed in the 2010s. It is named after the Meander Valley region.

- Hadspen Bypass - Built in the 1970s when the Bass Highway went onto the B54 route, Nowadays, Meander Valley Road bypasses the town centre but the Speed limit being 80 km/H.

== C routes ==
There is not a single bypass that carries a C route in Tasmania.

== Proposed bypasses ==
=== Tasman Highway ===
- Sorell Bypass -

Sorell Bypass (Left red line, Tasman Highway)

The Sorell Bypass is a proposed bypass in Sorell and will possibly be built later on for the Tasman Highway.

=== Rokeby Road ===
- Rokeby Bypass -

The Rokeby Bypass is a proposed bypass in the suburb of Rokeby in the Clarence City Council. The bypass is planned to be built near the Glebe Hill Village shopping centre.

== Former proposed bypasses ==
=== Midland Highway ===
- Bagdad Bypass - The Bagdad Bypass was a proposed bypass in Bagdad but instead a Central turning lane was put in the middle of the road in Bagdad instead.

=== Brooker Highway, Tasman Highway, Southern Outlet ===
- Hobart Bypass -
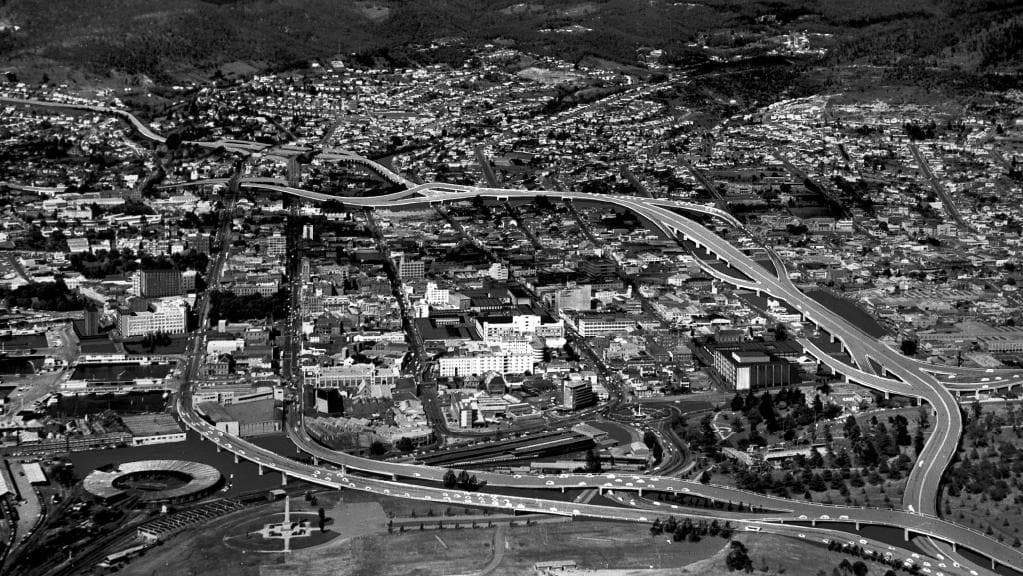
  The proposed Hobart Bypass
  The Hobart Bypass was a proposed bypass which was going to bypass the Hobart CBD carrying the Brooker, Tasman Highway's and the Hobart Southern Outlet. It was originally intended that the couplet system would serve as a stop gap measure prior to the construction of a freeway in the Hobart Area Transportation Study of 1965. Prior to this, all traffic in Hobart was 2-way.

== See also ==
- List of highways in Tasmania
