= Western Junction, Tasmania =

Western Junction
- Town
- Coordinates: 41°33′16″S 147°12′33″E
- Country: Australia
- State: Tasmania
- Region: Central
- LGA: Northern Midlands
- Location: 12 km (7.5 mi) NE of Longford

Government
  - State electorate: Lyons
  - Federal division: Lyons

Population
  - Total: 125 (2016 census)
- Postcode: 7212
Localities around Western Junction
| Breadalbane | Relbia | Relbia |
| Devon Hills, Perth | Western Junction | Evandale, White Hills |
| Perth | Evandale | Evandale |

Western Junction is a semi-rural locality and town in the local government area of Northern Midlands in the Central region of Tasmania. It is located about 12 kilometres (7.5 mi) north-east of the town of Longford. The 2016 census determined a population of 125 for the state suburb of Western Junction.

== History ==
Western Junction was gazetted as a locality in 1959.

== Geography ==
The South Esk River forms the southern boundary.

== Transport infrastructure ==
=== Road ===
The B41 route (Evandale Road) enters from the north-west and runs through to the south-east before exiting. Route C417 (Perth Mill Road) starts at an intersection with B41 and runs south-west before exiting.

=== Rail ===
The junction of the western and southern rail lines is in the locality.

=== Air ===
Launceston Airport is within the locality.
