= Nile, Tasmania =

Nile
- Town
- Coordinates: 41°38′49″S 147°21′40″E
- Country: Australia
- State: Tasmania
- Region: Central
- LGA: Northern Midlands
- Location: 30 km (19 mi) SE of Longford; 30 km (19 mi) SE of Launceston; 18 km (11 mi) SE of Perth; 172 km (107 mi) N of Hobart

Government
  - State electorate: Lyons
  - Federal division: Lyons
- Elevation: 181 m (594 ft)

Population
  - Total: 154 (2016 census)
- Postcode: 7212
Localities around Nile
Evandale	Evandale	Deddington
Perth, Powranna, Epping Forest	Nile	Conara, Deddington
Epping Forest	Epping Forest, Conara	Conara

Nile is a rural locality in the local government area of Northern Midlands in the Central region of Tasmania. It is located just south of Evandale, about 30 kilometres (19 mi) southeast of the town of Longford. The 2016 census determined a population of 154 for the state suburb of Nile.

== History ==
Nile was gazetted as a locality in 1959. It was originally known as Lymington. The National Trust of Australia's Clarendon House in Nile was built in 1838.

== Geography ==
The South Esk River forms the locality's western boundary.

== Road infrastructure ==
The C416 route (Nile Road) enters from the north-west and runs through to the south-east before exiting. Route C418 (Clarendon Station Road / Clarendon Lodge Road) starts at an intersection with C416 north of the village and runs west and then north before exiting. Route C419 (Bryants Lane) starts at the same intersection and runs north-east before exiting. Route C420 (Deddington Road) starts at an intersection with C416 just south of the village and also exits to the north-east.
