= Midland Highway (Tasmania) =

Highway in Tasmania, Australia

Midland Highway Tasmania
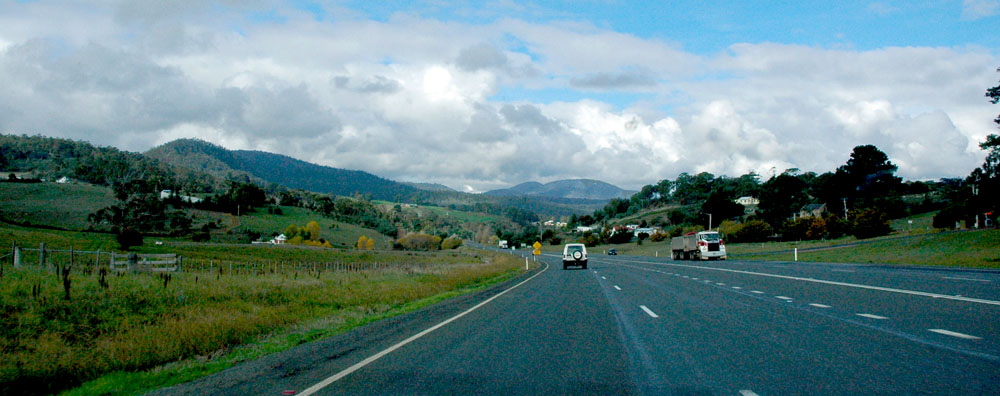
- Midland Highway, at Dysart
- Coordinates: 42.7568860°S 147.2304269°E (South end); 41.4391283°S 147.1358243°E 41.4399298°S 147.1342197°E (North end)

General information
- Type: Highway
- Length: 181 km (112 mi)
- Route number(s): National Highway 1 Hobart – Launceston
- Former route number: State Route 1

Major junctions
- South end: Brooker Highway; Granton, Hobart, Tasmania
- Lyell Highway; Boyer Road; East Derwent Highway; Highland Lakes Road; Mud Walls Road; Lake Leake Highway; Esk Highway; Powranna Road; Leighlands Road; Illawarra Road; Evandale Road; Bass Highway
- North end: Bathurst Street; York Street; Launceston, Tasmania

Location(s)
- Region: Tasmania
- Major settlements: Perth, Epping Forest Campbell Town, Ross, Oatlands, Bagdad, Brighton, Bridgewater

Highway system
- Highways in Australia; National Highway • Freeways in Australia; Highways in Tasmania

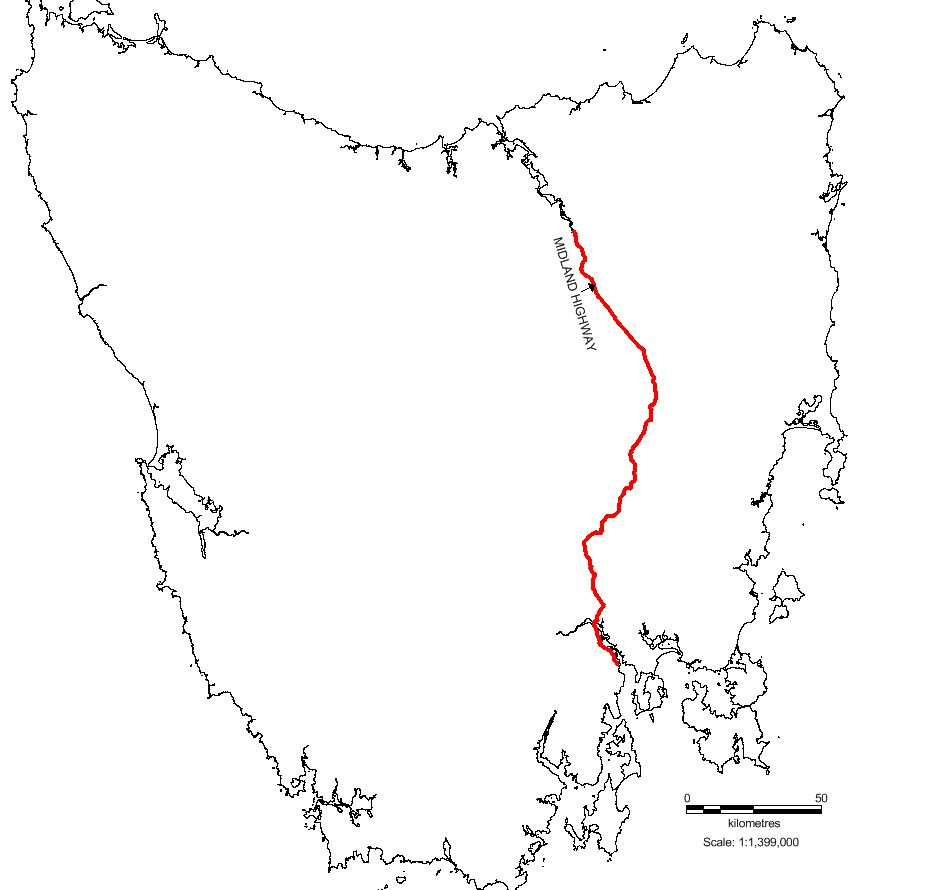
Map of Midland Highway, Tasmania

The Midland Highway (also known as the Midlands Highway) is one of Tasmania's major inter-city highways, running for 181 kilometres (112 mi) between Hobart and Launceston. It is part of the AusLink National Network and is a vital link for road freight to transport goods to and from the two cities. It represents a major north–south transportation corridor in Tasmania and has the route 1 designation as part of the National Highway. The highway consists of various traffic lane arrangements, the most common being two lanes – one in each direction, with overtaking options and at-grade intersections. At both the Launceston and Hobart sections of the highway there are small portions of grade-separated dual carriageway.

== History ==
Surveyor Grimes marked out the track from Hobart to Launceston in 1807, and Governor Lachlan Macquarie followed the route in 1811 when he visited the colony accompanied by his wife. The party took five and a half days to complete the journey.

Macquarie again visited the colony in 1821, when the road was fit for a carriage, but his journal records many different sections, and it was not until 1831 that the first regular coach service was operated by J. E. Cox.

The first mailman, Robert Taylor, was appointed in 1816. He walked, leaving Hobart and Launceston on alternate Sundays and carrying the mail in a pack.

The first record of movement between the two centres was in 1821 when Macquarie selected sites for towns on the highway.

It was known as the "Main Road" or "Hobart Road" for most of its history. In the 1930s it became known as the Midland Highway, and in the 2000s - it also had "The Heritage Highway" label applied to it.

The route of the highway originally ran between Hobart and Launceston, and passed through the localities which are now known as: Bridgewater, Brighton, Pontville, Mangalore, Bagdad, Dysart, Kempton, Melton Mowbray, Jericho, Oatlands, Antill Ponds, Woodbury, Tunbridge, Ross, Campbell Town, Conara Junction, Cleveland, Epping Forest, Perth, Breadalbane and Kings Meadows.

== Recent upgrades ==
A number of two lane bypasses of towns and villages have been constructed since the early 1980s, including the Jericho bypass, which was opened to traffic in January 1982.

Construction of grade separated dual carriageways leading south of Launceston and north of Hobart provided new superior facilities for Midland Highway traffic and shortened the route officially designated the Midland Highway.

On 21 June 1983, what was then referred to as the "Hobart Northern Outlet Road" was opened to traffic. Now called the Brooker Highway, this completed a grade-separated dual carriageway between Claremont Interchange and Granton in the northern suburbs of Hobart.

Construction of the first stage of the Launceston Southern Outlet between Glen Dhu and Strathroy commenced in February 1981 and comprised the construction of 7.4 km of dual carriageway and included three major bridges, namely the Mt Pleasant Interchange, the Westbury Road Overpass and the Glen Dhu Overpass. The highway opened to traffic between the Glen Dhu interchange and the temporary connection onto the old Midland Highway at Jinglers Creek, Strathroy. The extension of the Launceston Southern Outlet Road between Breadalbane and Strathroy opened to traffic on 28 August 1987. This extension included the construction of 3.7 km of dual carriageway and a roundabout, linking the Outlet Road with the Midland Highway and Evandale Main Road. The third and final section of the Launceston Southern Outlet opened to traffic on 24 May 1988. The road works involved construction of 1 km of dual carriageway between Glen Dhu Overpass and the Frankland Street/Wellington Street intersection.

In 2002, a railway line underpass was constructed near Symmons Plains, south of Perth, to create a grade separated rail crossing on the highway itself. Significant numbers of overtaking lanes have also been extended or created.

In October 2012, the Brighton Bypass was officially opened, six months ahead of schedule. This bypass is a grade separated dual carriageway of the towns of Brighton and Pontville, just beyond Hobart's northern suburbs. The total cost of the bypass was A$191 million.

On 16 April 2020, the second and final stage of the Perth Link Roads project was officially completed over 3 years ahead of schedule, including the opening of the long-overdue bypass of Perth. The bypass consists of 4.5 km of dual carriageway, including a grade separated interchange with Illawarra Road, an interchange consisting of two roundabouts north of the Perth, and a roundabout south of the town centre, near the South Esk River bridge. Stage 1 of the project was completed in April 2018, including a new grade separated interchange at Breadalbane to bypass the existing roundabout which provides connections with Launceston Airport, Evandale and the old Midland Highway alignment to Youngtown and Kings Meadows. A new dual carriageway alignment was also constructed alongside the existing highway to connect the new Breadalbane interchange with the Perth bypass.

As part of the Southern Transport Investment Program, a new Bridgewater Bridge was constructed and opened in June 2025. The works also encompassed new grade-separated interchanges to the Lyell Highway and Bridgewater. The transport study also caters for a future Bagdad Bypass.

== Major intersections and exits ==
Location	km	mi	Destinations	Notes	
Launceston	Launceston	0– 0	0.0– 0.0	Brisbane Street	The start of the Midland Highway on Wellington street.
Launceston	0.150	0.093	Wellington Street, / York Street		
0.980	0.609	Wellington Street	T interchange		
Launceston	South Launceston	1.27	0.79	Howick Street	Plus interchange
Launceston	South Launceston	1.84	1.14	Pipeworks Road	Semi diamond intersection
Launceston	Prospect	3.46	2.15	Bass Highway	Trumpet interchange
Launceston	Youngtown	5.37	3.34	Kings Meadows Link	Semi clover interchange
Northern Midlands	Breadalbane	11	6.8	Evandale Road	Trumpet interchange
Northern Midlands	Devon Hills	12.94	8.04	Old Midland Highway	Diamond intersection
Northern Midlands	Perth	15.19	9.44	Main Road	Diamond intersection with two roundabouts
Northern Midlands	Perth	16.65	10.35	Illawarra Road	Semi-directional T interchange
Northern Midlands	Perth	19.67	12.22	Main Road / Eskleigh Road	Roundabout
South Esk River		20	12	Bridge name not known	
Northern Midlands	23.18	14.40	Leighlands Road	T interchange	
Northern Midlands	25.16	15.63	Longford Road	T interchange	
Northern Midlands	Powranna			Powranna Road	T interchange
Northern Midlands	Conara	53.87	33.47	Glen Esk Road	T interchange
Northern Midlands	Conara	57	35	Esk Highway	T interchange
Northern Midlands	Campbell Town	66.97	41.61	Pedder Street	T interchange
Elizabeth River		68	42	Red Bridge	
Northern Midlands	Campbell Town	68.63	42.64	Lake Leake Highway	T interchange
Northern Midlands	Ross	77.62	48.23	Chiswick Road	T interchange
Northern Midlands	Ross	83.3	51.8	Roseneath Road	T interchange
Southern Midlands	St Peter's Pass	110.8	68.8	York Plains Road	T interchange
Southern Midlands	Oatlands	114.4	71.1	High Street	T interchange
Southern Midlands	Oatlands	118	73	High Street	T interchange
Southern Midlands	124.5	77.4	Stonor Road	T interchange	
Southern Midlands	127.4	79.2	Mud Walls	T interchange	
Southern Midlands	Jericho	129.5	80.5	Lower Marshes Road	T interchange
Southern Midlands	139.4	86.6	Lovely Banks Road	T interchange	
Southern Midlands	Melton Mowbray	144.3	89.7	Highland Lakes Road	T interchange
Southern Midlands	Kempton	150	93	Main Street	T interchange
Southern Midlands	Kempton	152	94	Main Street	T interchange
Southern Midlands	Dysart	156.5	97.2	Clifton Vale Road	T interchange
Southern Midlands	Bagdad	166.6	103.5	Black Brush Road	T interchange
Brighton	Pontville	169.3	105.2	Pontville Road	Roundabout
Brighton	Brighton	172.5	107.2	Tea Tree Road	Diamond intersection
Brighton	Brighton	176	109	Brighton Road	Trumpet interchange
Brighton	Brighton	177.5	110.3	Gladstone Road	Diamond intersection with a roundabout
Brighton	Bridgewater	178.7	111.0	East Derwent Highway	Roundabout
Brighton	Bridgewater	179.5	111.5	Boyer Road	Semi clover interchange
Derwent River		180	110	Bridgewater Bridge	
Hobart	Granton	181	112	Brooker Highway / Lyell Highway	Semi trumpet intersection
1.000 mi = 1.609 km; 1.000 km = 0.621 mi

== See also ==
Media related to Midland Highway, Tasmania at Wikimedia Commons

- Highways in Australia
- List of highways in Tasmania
- List of bypasses in Tasmania
- Brighton Transport Hub
