= Powranna, Tasmania =

Powranna Tasmania
- Coordinates: 41°40′43″S 147°15′50″E
- Population: 25 (2016 census)
- Postcode(s): 7300
- Elevation: 181 m (594 ft)
- Location: 20 km (12 mi) SE of Longford; 35 km (22 mi) SE of Launceston; 17 km (11 mi) SE of Perth; 21 km (13 mi) E of Cressy; 168 km (104 mi) N of Hobart
- LGA(s): Northern Midlands
- Region: Central
- State electorate(s): Lyons
- Federal division(s): Lyons
Localities around Powranna:
Longford, Perth	Perth	Nile
Cressy	Powranna	Nile
Epping Forest, Cressy	Epping Forest	Epping Forest

Powranna is a rural locality in the local government area of Northern Midlands in the Central region of Tasmania. It is located about 20 kilometres (12 mi) south-east of the town of Longford. The 2016 census determined a population of 25 for the state suburb of Powranna.

== History ==
Powranna was gazetted as a locality in 1959. The name is an Aboriginal word for “black snake”.

== Geography ==
The South Esk River forms the eastern boundary.

== Road infrastructure ==
The Midland Highway (National route 1) enters from the north-west and runs through to the south-east before exiting. Route B53 (Powranna Road) starts at an intersection with route 1 and runs south-west before exiting.
