= Epping Forest, Tasmania =

Epping Forest
- Town
- Coordinates: 41°44′03″S 147°24′28″E
- Country: Australia
- State: Tasmania
- Region: Central
- LGA: Northern Midlands
- Location: 38 km (24 mi) SE of Longford

Government
  - State electorate: Lyons
  - Federal division: Lyons

Population
  - Total: 72 (2016 census)
- Postcode: 7211
Localities around Epping Forest
| Powranna | Nile | Nile |
| Cressy | Epping Forest | Conara |
| Campbell Town | Campbell Town | Cleveland |

Epping Forest is a rural locality in the local government area (LGA) of Northern Midlands in the Central LGA region of Tasmania. The locality is about 38 kilometres (24 mi) south-east of the town of Longford. The 2016 census recorded a population of 72 for the state suburb of Epping Forest.

== History ==
Epping Forest was gazetted as a locality in 1956. The area was named Epping by Governor Lachlan Macquarie's party in 1811, presumably for Epping in England. It became known unofficially as Epping Forest and, when in 1956 a name change was required to avoid duplication, Epping Forest was chosen.

== Geography ==
The South Esk River forms the northern boundary, and the Macquarie River forms part of the southern.

== Road infrastructure ==
Highway 1 (Midland Highway) passes through from south-east to north-west.
