= Southern Outlet =

Southern Outlet can refer to:

- Southern Outlet, Hobart, a highway in Hobart, Tasmania
- The northern section of the Midland Highway, is called the Southern Outlet in Launceston, Tasmania
