= Illawarra Road =

Road in Tasmania, Australia

Illawarra Road Tasmania

General information
- Type: Road
- Length: 15 km (9.3 mi)
- Route number(s): B52

Major junctions
- East end: Midland Highway; Perth
- Cressy Road Longford; Bass Highway
- West end: Meander Valley Highway Carrick

Location(s)
- Region: Midlands

Illawarra Road (also known as Illawarra Main Road) (B52) is a bypass road in the north of the Australian state of Tasmania. It connects the Midland Highway (N1) in Perth with the Bass Highway (N1) and the Meander Valley Highway (B54), bypassing the city of Launceston.

== Upgrades ==
In 2022, roadworks began between the roundabout near Longford to Bishopsbourne Road. The road has Truck stops with the road in between the truck stops. On 25 June, 2025, roadwork began between the Bass Highway and near Longford constructing overtaking lanes and U-turn bays. The roadwork has not been finished yet.

== Route ==
The road branches off the Midland Highway to the west in Perth, about 15 km south of Launceston. The Cressy Road (B51) joins Longford and the Illawarra Road crosses the South Esk River. Then it continues its way on the west bank of the river to the northwest and is connected to the Bass Highway and the Meander Valley Road just before the mouth of the river in Lake Trevallyn, about 13 km southwest of Launceston.

== Major intersections ==
Location	km	mi	Destinations	Notes
Perth	0	0.0	Midland Highway	Semi-directional T interchange where the Road starts
Longford	0.470	0.292	Pateena Road	T interchange
South Esk River		1.8	1.1	Bridge over river (name not known)
Longford	2.83	1.76	Cressy Road	Roundabout
Longford	4	2.5	Bishopsbourne Road	T interchange
10.86	6.75	Bass Highway	Semi trumpet intersection	
Carrick	12.95	8.05	Meander Valley Road	T interchange and end of Illawarra Road
1.000 mi = 1.609 km; 1.000 km = 0.621 mi
