= Bass Highway (Tasmania) =

Highway in Tasmania, Australia

Bass Highway Tasmania
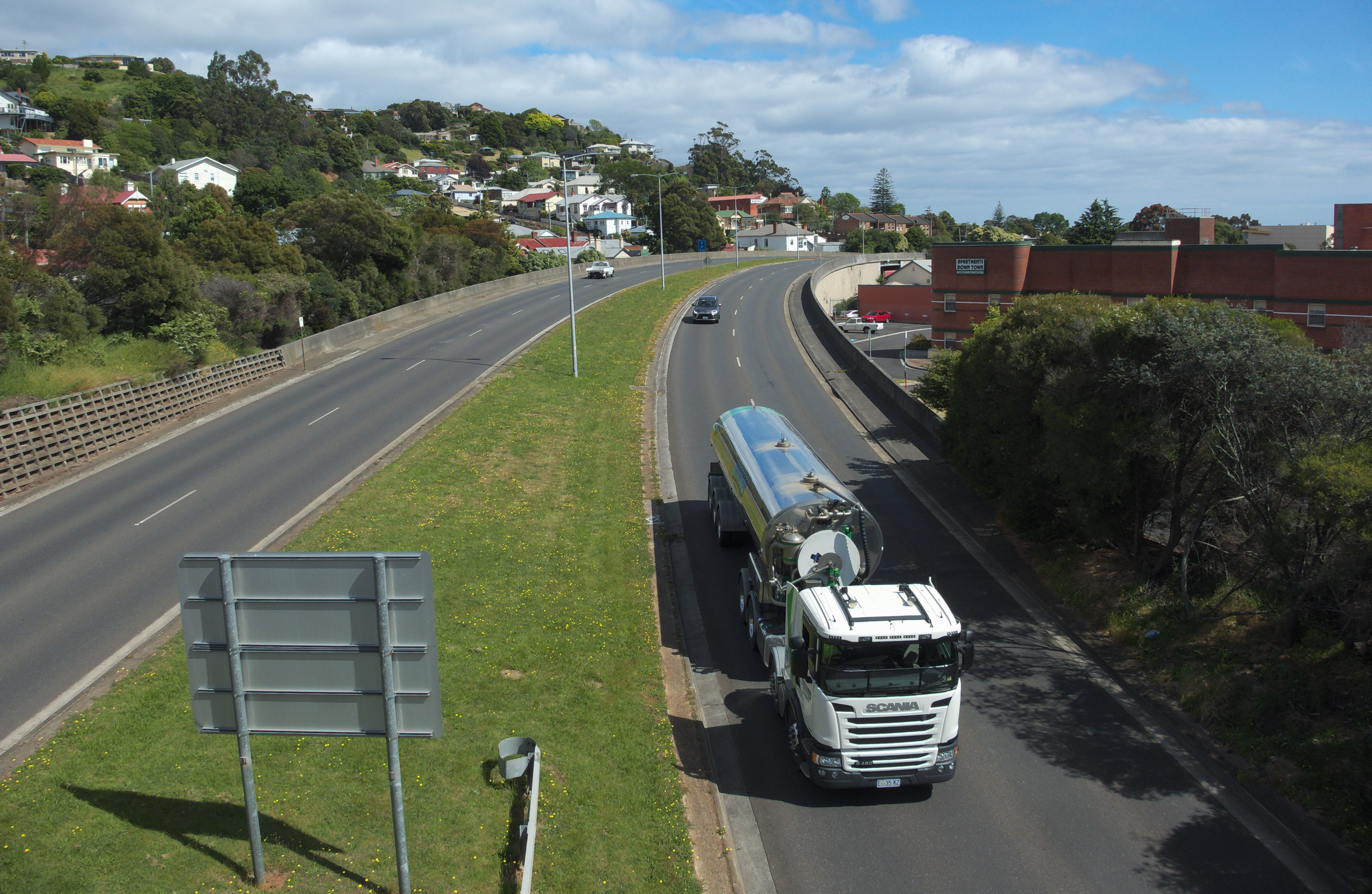
- The Bass Highway in Burnie
- Coordinates: 41.4724452°S 147.1406889°E (East end); 40.9310902°S 144.6871885°E (West end)

General information
- Type: Highway
- Length: 273 km (170 mi)
- Route number(s): National Highway 1; Launceston – Burnie; A2; Burnie – Marrawah
- Former route number: State Route 2

Major junctions
- East end: Midland Highway; Prospect, Launceston, Tasmania
- Meander Valley Road; Illawarra Road; Meander Valley Road; Birralee Road; Highland Lakes Road; Mole Creek Road; Railton Road; Gilbert Street; Port Sorell Road; Stony Rise Road; Turners Beach Road; Castra Road; Gawler Road; Pine Road; Mount Street; Murchison Highway; Mount Hicks Road; Stanley Highway; Irishtown Road
- West end: Arthur River Road; Comeback Road; Marrawah, Tasmania

Location(s)
- Region: Tasmania
- Major settlements: Deloraine, Devonport, Ulverstone, Burnie, Wynyard, Smithton

Highway system
- Highways in Australia; National Highway • Freeways in Australia; Highways in Tasmania

The Bass Highway is a highway in Tasmania, Australia. It connects the three cities across the north of the state – Burnie, Devonport and Launceston. The road was named due to its proximity to the Bass Strait. It is a part of the National Highway, designated as National Highway 1, together with the Midland and Brooker highways in Tasmania.

The highway passes through or past the following localities:

- Launceston
- Prospect and other Launceston suburbs
- Hadspen
- Carrick
- Hagley
- Westbury
- Exton
- Deloraine
- Elizabeth Town
- Sassafras
- Latrobe
- Devonport
- Forth
- Ulverstone
- Penguin
- Burnie

From here, the highway ceases to be part of the National Highway, but continues as the Bass Highway (A2) through the following towns:

- Somerset
- Wynyard
- Smithton
- Marrawah

The Bass Highway is, like Bass Strait, named for explorer George Bass.

== Route description ==
The Bass Highway starts on the Launceston Southern Outlet which carries the Midland Highway, near the Silverdome. It meets its first intersection with Westbury Road, and Meander Valley Road (B54) bypassing Prospect Vale. It meets Meander Valley Road again, but connecting with Pateena Road (C531). The dual carriageway ends near the South Esk River, and meets Illawarra Road (B52). The highway remains as a typical two-lane single carriageway, but with a few over-taking lanes, and other various intersections like Meander Valley Road meeting the Bass Highway multiple times. It meets the intersection for Highlands Lake Road while previously going past the Ashley Youth Detention Centre, and bypassing Deloraine. It goes through Elizabeth Town and other small localities. It goes through Devonport, bypassing localities and goes through Burnie. From Burnie, the Bass Highway route number changes from National Highway 1, to route A2. It goes through the other suburbs of Burnie, and bypasses Wynyard. It stays completely rural while meeting roads with route lables, and going through Smithton, and then goes through the rural parts of the West Coast of Tasmania, which then ends near Marrawah on Arthur River Road (C214), and Harcus River Road (C215).

== Upgrades ==
The name "Bass Highway" was in use by 1938. Since the mid-1970s the highway has undergone significant upgrades that have included bypasses and deviations, duplications and grade separations, particularly between Burnie and Launceston. On 30 March 1977, 'stage A' of the 'Burnie Highway System' was opened to traffic. This stage connected the Bass Highway east of the town with Alexander Street by an elevated roadway over the port access road and rail lines. Shortly after, on 19 April 1977, the bypass of Devonport was completed with the opening of the final section between Middle Road, Devonport and Don, referred to in that year's Main Roads Annual Report as the 'Devonport to Don Freeway'. This section was an extension of the earlier Victoria Bridge project. Three years later, the Ulverstone bypass was completed and opened to traffic in August 1980. The duplication of the highway from Wivenhoe, east of Burnie, to Chasm Creek was completed during the 1983–84 financial year, and was followed in May 1984 with the opening of 500 metres of 'stage B' of the Burnie Highway System. This section duplicated the highway along North Terrace. In September 1986, all four lanes over the complete length of 'stage B' of the 'Burnie Expressway' ('Burnie Highway System') were brought into operation. Throughout 1986 and 1987, sections of the highway were progressively duplicated and opened to traffic between Don (Devonport) and the Forth River, with the last section completed in June 1987. This was followed by completion of duplication between Forth River and Ulverstone in late 1987. In 1988, at the eastern terminus of the Bass Highway, a new alignment was opened to connect directly to the then new Launceston Southern Outlet, which itself had opened to traffic in 1985. Known as the Prospect bypass, this alignment was opened to traffic on 23 January 1988. West of Burnie, the Smithton bypass was opened to traffic in May 1988. The Deloraine Bypass was opened on 8 June 1990. The project was carried out over five years and cost a total of A$19 million. The bypass opening was performed by the Federal and State ministers for Land Transport and Roads and Transport respectively.

Other bypasses have included Carrick and Hadspen in the late 1980s and the longest stretch of highway, the Hagley–Westbury bypass, which was completed in 2001. The 'old' highway alignment between Deloraine and Hadspen is now known as Meander Valley Road, and is promoted as a tourist route.

In the 2020s, the Bass Highway has received minor upgrades, like sealing potholes and repainting roadmarking on the National Highway 1 route label, while the A2 route lable section of the Bass Highway has undergone significant upgrades. The Old Cam River Bridge was replaced by a new Cam River Bridge which construction began between 2022 to 2024 or 2025, which also resulted that the intersection for the Murchison Highwayreceived traffic lights.

Prior to the construction of the new Cam River Bridge in 2022, the Bass Highway also received a new 4-lane dual carriageway with cable barriers in the middle of the highway near Somerset to the Old Bass Highway near Wynyard, also improving safety from the sharp turns and curves.

== Major intersections ==
LGA	Location	km	mi	Destinations	Notes
Launceston	Prospect	0	0.0	Midland Highway (National Highway 1) – north – Launceston / southeast – Hobart	Eastern end of Bass Highway. Continues south west as National Highway 1.
Launceston	Prospect / Prospect Vale midpoint	2.0– 2.8	1.2– 1.7	Meander Valley Road (B54) – northwest – Prospect Vale / southwest – Travellers Rest / Westbury Road – northeast – Prospect Vale	Eastbound exit via Westbury Road
Meander Valley	Travellers Rest	4.8– 5.0	3.0– 3.1	Meander Valley Road (B54) – west – Hadspen / northeast – Prospect / Pateena Road (C531) – south – Longford	No eastbound exit from or westbound entry to Bass Highway
South Esk River		8.9– 9.0	5.5– 5.6	Bridge over river (name not known)	
Meander Valley	Carrick	10.8– 11.6	6.7– 7.2	Illawarra Road (B52) – northwest – Carrick / southeast – Longford	
Meander Valley	Carrick	14.9	9.3	Bishopsbourne Road (C513) – north – Carrick / south – Bishopsbourne	
Liffey River		15.8	9.8	Bridge over river (name not known)	
Meander Valley	Carrick	16.1– 17.1	10.0– 10.6	Oaks Road (C511) – northeast – Carrick / southwest – Bracknell	
Meander Valley	Carrick	18.3	11.4	Whitemore Road (C508) – northeast – Carrick / southwest – Whitemore	
Whitemore Creek		21.8– 21.9	13.5– 13.6	Bridge over creek (name not known)	
Meander Valley	Hagley	23.1– 23.5	14.4– 14.6	Hagley Station Lane (C507) – northeast – Hagley southwest – Whitemore	No eastbound exit from or westbound entry to Bass Highway
Meander Valley	Hagley / Westbury midpoint	26.0– 27.6	16.2– 17.1	Meander Valley Road (B54) – west – Westbury / east – Hagley	No westbound entry to Bass Highway
Meander Valley	Westbury	30.2– 30.9	18.8– 19.2	Birralee Road (B72) – northwest – Birralee / William Street (B72) – southeast – Westbury	
Meander Valley	Deloraine	42.5– 43.2	26.4– 26.8	Lake Highway (A5) – south – Deloraine	
Meander River		44.6	27.7	Bridge over river (name not known)	
Meander Valley	Deloraine	46.3– 48.0	28.8– 29.8	Mole Creek Road (B12) – south – Mole Creek / Weetah Road (C710) – north – Weetah	Westbound entry via Emu Bay Road
Meander Valley	Elizabeth Town	52.8	32.8	Bengeo Road (C163) – south – Red Hills	
Meander Valley	Elizabeth Town	55.3	34.4	Railton Road (B13) – west – Railton	
Meander Valley	Elizabeth Town	55.3	34.4	Parkham Road (C711) – northeast – Parkham	
Latrobe	Sassafras	77.0	47.8	Chapel Road (C713) – north – Harford	
Latrobe	Sassafras	80.1	49.8	East Sassafras Road (C706) – east – Sassafras / Cutting Road – west – Sassafras	From the eastern part of Sassafras, route C706 runs north on Greens Creek Road to Harford
Latrobe	Sassafras	81.4	50.6	Native Plains Road (C153) – south – Railton	
Latrobe	Sassafras / Latrobe midpoint	82.4	51.2	Oppenheims Road (C704) – north, then east – Harford	
Latrobe	Latrobe	85.5	53.1	Gilbert Street to Mersey Main Road (B19) – west – Spreyton	
Latrobe	Latrobe	86.8– 87.0	53.9– 54.1	Moriarty Road (C702) – east – Moriarty / southwest – Latrobe	
Devonport	Latrobe / East Devonport midpoint	90.7– 91.2	56.4– 56.7	Port Sorell Road (B74) – northeast – Port Sorell / southwest – Latrobe	
Devonport	East Devonport	92.9– 93.4	57.7– 58.0	Tarleton Street – north – East Devonport / River Road – south – Ambleside	
Mersey River		93.5– 93.7	58.1– 58.2	Victoria Bridge	
Devonport	Devonport / Miandetta midpoint	93.9– 94.5	58.3– 58.7	Formby Road – north – Devonport / to Devonport Road – south – Miandetta	
Devonport	Devonport / Miandetta midpoint	95.1– 95.7	59.1– 59.5	Middle Road – north – Devonport / southwest – Miandetta	
Devonport	Stony Rise	96.8– 98.0	60.1– 60.9	Stony Rise Road (B19) – southeast – Spreyton / northwest, then southwest as Forth Road – Forth / Don Road – northeast – Devonport	
Don River		98.4	61.1	Bridge over river (name not known)	
Central Coast	Leith	105.8	65.7	Leith Road (C132) – southwest, then south – Forth / Braddons Lookout Road (C189) – northeast, then south – Forth	
Forth River		106.1– 106.2	65.9– 66.0	Bridge over river (name not known)	
Central Coast	Turners Beach	107.3– 108.4	66.7– 67.4	Forth Road (B19) – south – Forth / Turners Beach Road – north – Turners Beach	Westbound entry via Westella Drive
Central Coast	Ulverstone	110.5– 111.4	68.7– 69.2	Eastland Drive (C142) – north, then west – Ulverstone	
Central Coast	Ulverstone	111.9– 112.1	69.5– 69.7	Main Street (B15) – northwest – Ulverstone / Castra Road (B15) – south – Upper Castra	No eastbound entry to or exit from Bass Highway
Central Coast	Ulverstone	113.8– 114.6	70.7– 71.2	Lovett Street (B17) – north – Ulverstone / Gawler Road (B17) – south – Gawler	Westbound entry via Adaihi Street
River Leven		115.1– 115.3	71.5– 71.6	Bridge over river (name not known)	
Central Coast	West Ulverstone	116.5– 117.2	72.4– 72.8	South Road (C142) – east – Ulverstone	
Central Coast	Penguin	125.2– 125.8	77.8– 78.2	Pine Road (B17) – southwest – Riana / Mission Hill Road – north-east – Penguin	
Central Coast	Howth / Sulphur Creek midpoint	130.7	81.2	Nine Mile Road (C118) – northwest, then south – West Pine	
Central Coast	Heybridge	132.9	82.6	River Avenue (C117) – south, then southwest to Cuprona Road – Cuprona	
Blythe River		133.4– 133.5	82.9– 83.0	Bridge over river (name not known)	
Central Coast	Heybridge	133.9	83.2	Minna Road (C113) – southwest – Stowport	
Burnie	Wivenhoe	138.1	85.8	Stowport Road (C102) – southwest – Stowport	
Emu River		139.1	86.4	Bridge over river (name not known)	
Burnie	South Burnie	139.2– 139.3	86.5– 86.6	Old Surrey Road (C112) – south – Emu Heights	
Burnie	Burnie	141.2– 141.4	87.7– 87.9	Mount Street (B18) – south – Upper Burnie	Bass Highway changes from National Highway 1 to A2
Burnie	Parklands / Burnie midpoint	142.5	88.5	West Park Grove (C108) – southwest – Park Grove	
Burnie	Camdale	147.3	91.5	East Cam Road (C109) – south – East Cam	
Cam River		147.6– 147.7	91.7– 91.8	Bridge over river (name not known)	
Waratah-Wynyard	Somerset	147.8	91.8	Murchison Highway (A10) – south – Queenstown	
Waratah-Wynyard	Somerset	149.0	92.6	Raglan Street to Seabrook Road (C241) – south, then west – Mount Hicks	
Waratah-Wynyard	Doctors Rocks	153.8	95.6	Old Bass Highway (C240) – northwest – Wynyard	
Waratah-Wynyard	Wynyard	156.7	97.4	Mount Hicks Road (B26) – south – Mount Hicks / Mount Hicks Road (no shield) – north – Wynyard	
Waratah-Wynyard	Wynyard	160.8	99.9	Deep Creek Road (C239) – west, then south – Yolla	
Waratah-Wynyard	Wynyard	161.8	100.5	Oldina Road (C237) – southwest – Oldina	
Waratah-Wynyard	Wynyard	162.4	100.9	Calder Road (C235) – southwest – Calder	
Waratah-Wynyard	Wynyard	162.8	101.2	Inglis Street (C240) – southeast – Wynyard	
Inglis River		163.5	101.6	Bridge over river (name not known)	
Waratah-Wynyard	Flowerdale	164.9	102.5	Preolenna Road (C229) – west – Preolenna	
Waratah-Wynyard	Flowerdale / Table Cape / Boat Harbour tripoint	167.4	104.0	Tollymore Road (C234) – northeast – Table Cape	
Waratah-Wynyard	Boat Harbour	168.3	104.6	Gates Road (C231) – south (to route C229) – Flowerdale	
Waratah-Wynyard	Boat Harbour	171.6	106.6	Port Road (C232) – north – Boat Harbour Beach	
Waratah-Wynyard	Sisters Creek	176.3	109.5	Myalla Road (C229) – south – Myalla	From Preolenna C229 turns west and then north, returning to the Bass Highway via Myalla
Circular Head	Rocky Cape	191.0	118.7	Rocky Cape Road (C227) – northeast – Rocky Cape	
Detention River		192.3	119.5	Bridge over river (name not known)	
Circular Head	Black River	204.4	127.0	Mawbanna Road (C225) – southeast – Mawbanna	
Black River		205.8	127.9	Bridge over river (name not known)	
Circular Head	Wiltshire	208.6	129.6	Back Line Road (C221) – south, then west – Forest	
Circular Head	Wiltshire / Forest / Stanley tripoint	212.3	131.9	Mengha Road (C219) – south – Mengha / Stanley Highway (B21) – north – Stanley	
Circular Head	Smithton / Forest midpoint	221.2	137.4	Back Line Road (C221) – east – Forest	From Forest C221 runs west, returning to the Bass Highway at the Smithton boundary
Circular Head	Smithton	223.7	139.0	Irishtown Road (B22) – south – Irishtown	
Circular Head	Smithton	224.4	139.4	Brittons Road – northwest – Smithton	
Circular Head	Smithton	225.9	140.4	Trowutta Road (C217) – south – Edith Creek; Nelson Street (C215) – north – Smithton	From Smithton C215 runs west as Montagu Road, eventually intersecting with C213 at Marrawah
Duck River		227.6	141.4	Bridge over river (name not known)	
Circular Head	Redpa	265.6	165.0	Comeback Road (C213) – north, then west – Marrawah	
Circular Head	Marrawah	272.6	169.4	Arthur River Road (C214) – southwest, then south – Arthur River / Comeback Road (C213) – northeast, then east – Redpa	Western end of Bass Highway. From Redpa C213 runs west, returning to the Bass Highway in Marrawah.
1.000 mi = 1.609 km; 1.000 km = 0.621 mi: Incomplete access; Route transition

== See also ==
- Highways in Australia
- List of highways in Tasmania
- List of bypasses in Tasmania
