= Toiberry, Tasmania =

Toiberry Tasmania
- Coordinates: 41°36′28″S 147°02′17″E
- Population: 22 (2016 census)
- Postcode(s): 7301
- Location: 9 km (6 mi) W of Longford
- LGA(s): Northern Midlands
- Region: Central
- State electorate(s): Lyons
- Federal division(s): Lyons
Localities around Toiberry:
Bishopsbourne	Longford	Longford
Bishopsbourne	Toiberry	Longford
Cressy	Cressy	Cressy

Toiberry is a rural locality in the local government area (LGA) of Northern Midlands in the Central LGA region of Tasmania. The locality is about 9 kilometres (5.6 mi) west of the town of Longford. The 2016 census recorded a population of 22 for the state suburb of Toiberry.

== History ==
Toiberry was gazetted as a locality in 1959. The area was originally gazetted as Little Hampton. Toiberry is believed to be an Aboriginal word for “ashes”.

== Geography ==
Almost all of the boundaries are survey lines. The Western Railway Line passes through from north-east to north-west.

== Road infrastructure ==
Route C518 (Bishopsbourne Road) passes through from north-east to west.
