= Southern Outlet, Launceston =

Dual carriageway in Launceston, Tasmania, Australia

Southern Outlet Tasmania
- The Launceston Southern Outlet constructed in the 1980s at the bottom of the Southern Outlet at South Launceston near the Glen Dhu Road intersection with the Westbury Road Overpass in the background of the photograph

General information
- Type: Road
- Length: 12 km (7.5 mi)
- Opened: 1988
- Route number(s): National Highway (Midland Highway); Launceston - Breadalbane

Major junctions
- North end: Wellington Street
- National Highway Bass Highway; C403 Kings Meadows Link
- South end: National Highway (Breadalbane)

Location(s)
- Region: Launceston
- Major suburbs: near Youngtown, and Kings Meadows

The Southern Outlet is a major dual carriageway carrying the Midland Highway from South Launceston on Wellington Street to Breadalbane which ends on the bypass named Perth Link Roads.

Due to a previous issue of vehicles being backed up due to the Kings Meadows connector slip lane being short, in 2025, roadworks began between Mount Pleasant to the Kings Meadows Link interchange expanding the slip lane which is currently still under construction.

== Route ==
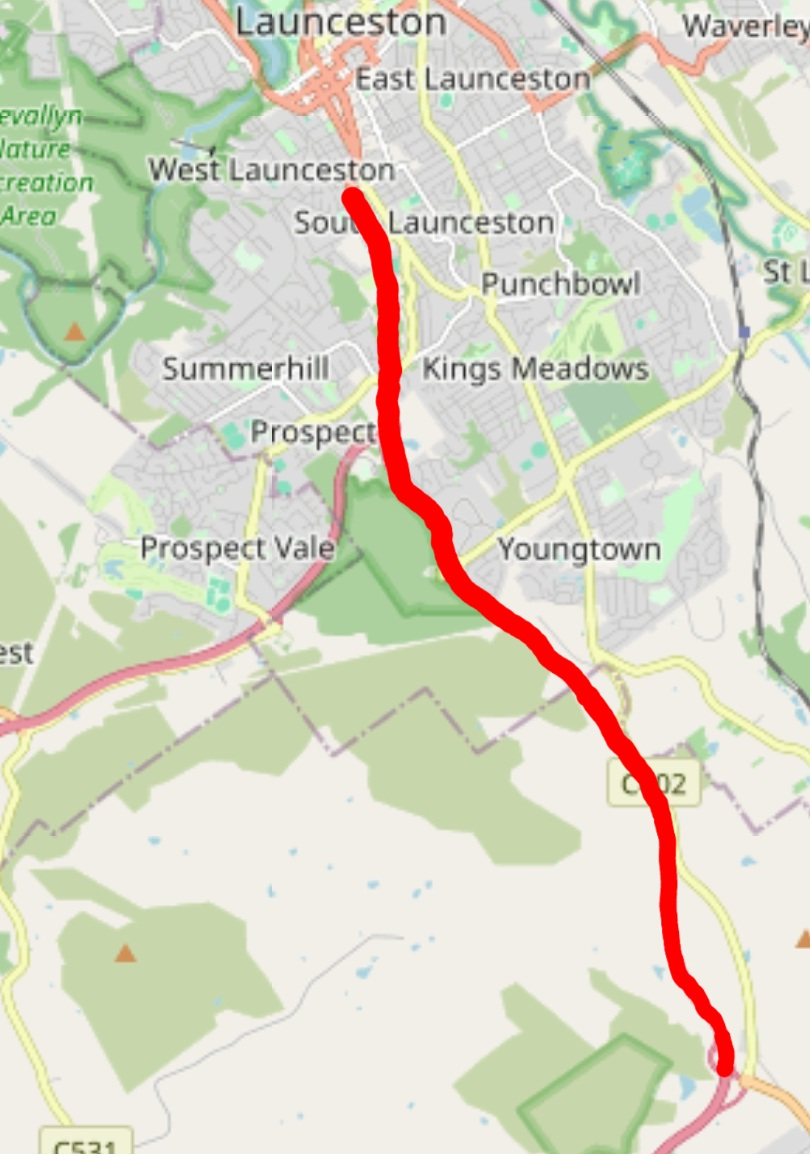
Southern Outlet route (red line)

The Southern Outlet starts when leaving South Launceston with a speed grade intersection for Glen Dhu Road and going under the Westbury Road Overpass. The route goes over the speed grade intersection for the Bass Highway then going over the speed grade intersection for Kings Meadows Link, for about 6 kilometres. It is just a dual carriageway going to Breadalbane, then going onto Perth Link Roads.

== Construction ==
Plans for the dual carriageway came from the Launceston Area Transportation Study of 1968. Construction of the first stage of the Launceston Southern Outlet between Glen Dhu and Strathroy commenced in February 1981 and comprised the construction of 7.4 km of dual carriageway and included three major bridges, namely the Mt Pleasant Interchange, the Westbury Road Overpass and the Glen Dhu Overpass. The highway opened to traffic between the Glen Dhu interchange and the temporary connection onto the old Midland Highway at Jinglers Creek, Strathroy. The extension of the Launceston Southern Outlet Road between Breadalbane and Strathroy opened to traffic on 28 August 1987. This extension included the construction of 3.7 km of dual carriageway and a roundabout, linking the Outlet Road with the Midland Highway and Evandale Main Road. The third and final section of the Launceston Southern Outlet opened to traffic on 24 May 1988. The road works involved construction of 1 km of dual carriageway between Glen Dhu Overpass and the Frankland Street/Wellington Street intersection.

== Safety ==
Crashes have been an issue on the section between the trumpet interchange with the Bass Highway and the Glen Dhu Overpass. In November 2019 the speed limit was cut to 90 kilometres per hour for safety reasons.

== Exits ==
Location	km	mi	Destinations	Notes	
Launceston	South Launceston	0	0.0	Wellington Street	Start of the Southern Outlet after leaving Wellington Street
Launceston	South Launceston	0.300	0.186	Howick Street	
Launceston	South Launceston	1.2	0.75	Pipeworks Road	Semi diamond intersection
Launceston	Prospect	2.4	1.5	Bass Highway	Trumpet interchange
Launceston	Youngtown	4.3	2.7	Kings Meadows Link	Semi clover interchange
Northern Midlands	Breadalbane	12	7.5	Evandale Road	Trumpet interchange and the Southern Outlet ending onto Perth Link Roads
1.000 mi = 1.609 km; 1.000 km = 0.621 mi
