= Brighton Council =

Brighton Council may refer to:

- Brighton Council (Tasmania) in Australia
- Brighton Borough Council in East Sussex, England, abolished in 1997
- Brighton and Hove City Council in East Sussex, England, formed in 1997
- District Council of Brighton, South Australia, Australia

== See also ==
- City of Brighton (disambiguation)
- Brighton (disambiguation)
