= Devon Hills, Tasmania =

Devon Hills
- Town
- Coordinates: 41°33′07″S 147°11′04″E
- Country: Australia
- State: Tasmania
- Region: Central
- LGA: Northern Midlands
- Location: 9 km (5.6 mi) NE of Longford

Government
  - State electorate: Lyons
  - Federal division: Lyons

Population
  - Total: 433 (2016 census)
- Postcode: 7300
Localities around Devon Hills
Breadalbane	Breadalbane	Breadalbane
Perth	Devon Hills	Western Junction
Perth	Perth	Western Junction

Devon Hills is a rural residential locality in the local government area (LGA) of Northern Midlands in the Central LGA region of Tasmania. The locality is about 9 kilometres (5.6 mi) north-east of the town of Longford. The 2016 census recorded a population of 433 for the state suburb of Devon Hills.

== History ==
Devon Hills is a confirmed locality.

== Geography ==
Most of the boundaries are survey lines. The Western Railway Line runs along part of the southern boundary.

== Road infrastructure ==
National Highway 1 (Midland Highway) runs along part of the western boundary, but Devon Hills Road provides access into the locality.
