= Breadalbane, Tasmania =

Breadalbane
- Town
- Coordinates: 41°32′S 147°11′E
- Country: Australia
- State: Tasmania
- Region: Central
- LGA: Northern Midlands Council
- Location: 11 km (6.8 mi) NE of Longford

Government
  - State electorate: Lyons
  - Federal division: Lyons

Population
  - Total: 108 (2016 census)
- Postcode: 7258
Localities around Breadalbane
Prospect	Youngtown, Prospect	Relbia
Longford	Breadalbane	Relbia
Perth	Devon Hills, Western Junction	Relbia, Western Junction

Breadalbane /brɛˈdoʊlbɪn/ is a rural locality in the local government area (LGA) of Northern Midlands in the Central LGA region of Tasmania. The locality is about 11 kilometres (6.8 mi) north-east of the town of Longford. The 2016 census recorded a population of 108 for the state suburb of Breadalbane.

== History ==
Breadalbane was gazetted as a locality in 1959.

It was named by Governor Macquarie after the Earl of Breadalbane, his wife's cousin. Earlier the district was known as "Cocked Hat", "The Springs" and "Brumby's Plain".

Breadalbane Post Office opened on 1 October 1847 and closed in 1968.

The Breadalbane area was notorious in the early 19th century for sheep stealing. In the colonial days there were three inns at Breadalbane, The Albion, The Temperance Hotel, and The Woolpack Inn (today, only the Woolpack Inn still stands).

Today, there is an important roundabout at Breadalbane at the entrance to the city of Launceston, and Launceston Airport.

== Geography ==
Almost all the boundaries are survey lines.

== Road infrastructure ==
National Route 1 (Midland Highway) runs through from north to south.
