= International Therapeutic Proteins =

International Therapeutic Proteins (known as ITP) was created in 2006. The company supplies antitoxins, antidotes to snake venoms and other biologics (biological therapeutics) to corporate and government clients.

== Company Info ==
The company's manufacturing base is located in the remote and temperate island of Tasmania. The remoteness, the climate and the island condition safeguards end products from contamination with BSE (bovine spongiform encephalopathy).

International Therapeutic Proteins is headquartered in the UK where administration, distribution and regulatory affairs are managed. The company's Australian subsidiary, called Australian Therapeutic Proteins, owns two farms in Tasmania totalling 500 hectares (1,235 acres). The farms are located in Longford, where Selborne Biological Services is also operating.

A dedicated protein separation facility is used for all antitoxin products. This consists of an upstream (pre viral inactivation) suite for the fractionation of IgG from whole serum or plasma and a downstream (post viral inactivation) suite to conduct further processing and formulation of the Fab fragment.
