= Meander Valley Road =

Road in Tasmania, Australia

Meander Valley Highway Tasmania
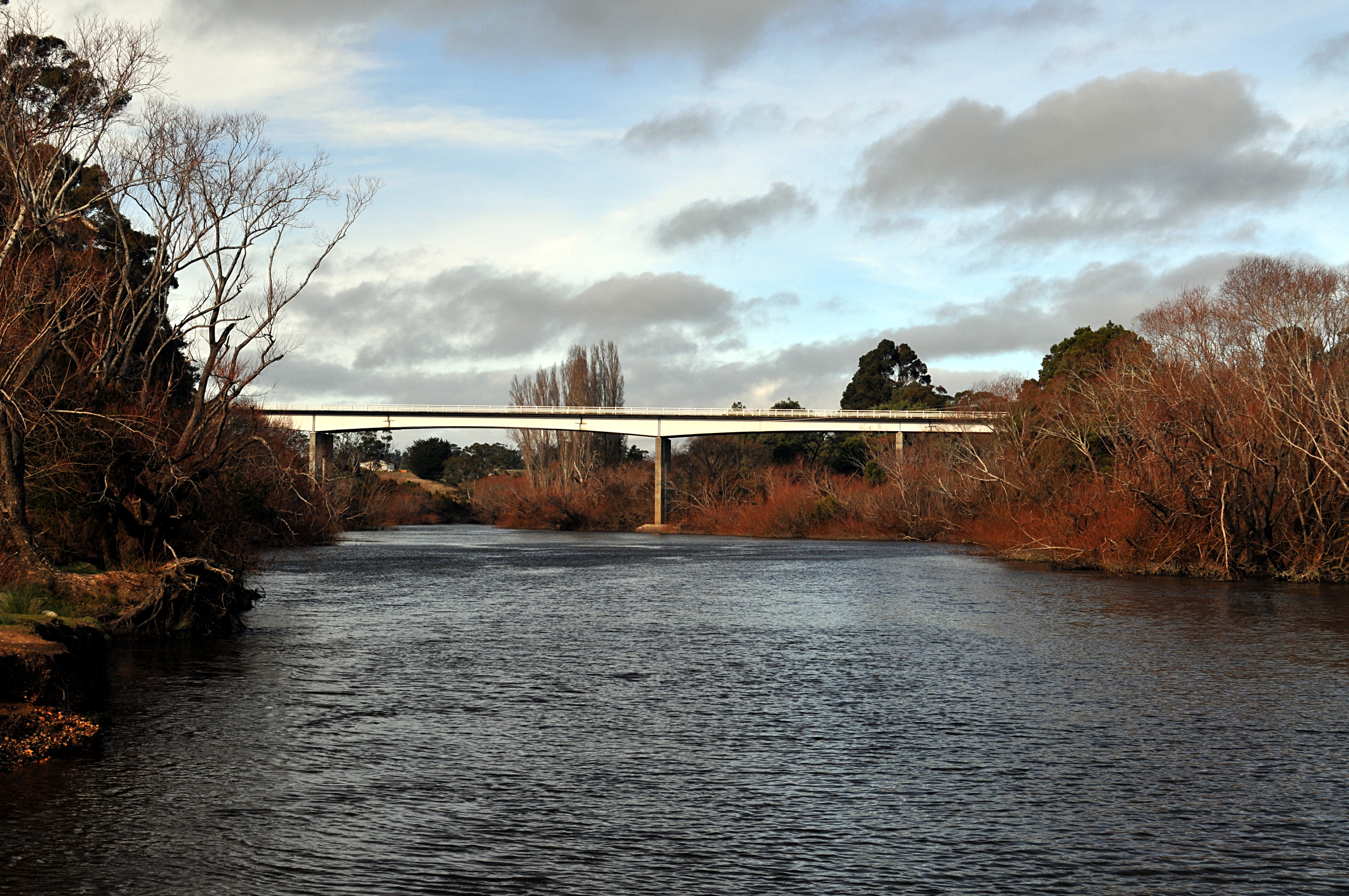
- Meander Valley Road on a Bridge over the South Esk River near Hadspen in 2012

General information
- Type: Road
- Length: 39.9 km (25 mi)
- Route number(s): B54; Deloraine - Prospect Vale
- Former route number: Bass Highway; 1980 - 2000s State Route 2; 1960s - 1979 Bass Highway

Major junctions
- West end: Highland Lakes Road, Deloraine
- Birralee Road; Bass Highway, nearby Westbury; Illawarra Road, nearby Hadspen and Carrick; Bass Highway, near Travellers Rest
- East end: Bass Highway Westbury Road, Prospect Vale and Launceston

Location(s)
- Major suburbs: Westbury, Carrick

Meander Valley Road (previously Meander Valley Highway) (B54) is a road located in the northern region of Tasmania, Australia. It connects the town of Deloraine to the Bass Highway near Prospect Vale and near Launceston, providing a scenic route through the Meander Valley.

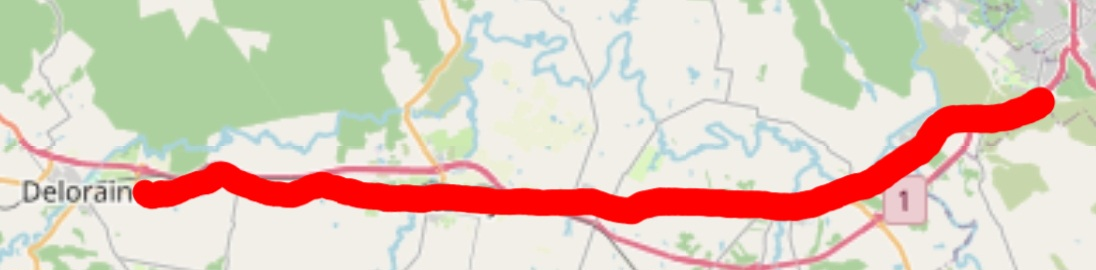
Map of Meander Valley Road

== Route ==
Meander Valley Road commences at the junction with the Highland Lakes Road (A5) at a roundabout nearby Deloraine, heading east through the agricultural landscapes of the Meander Valley. The road passes through several small towns, including Westbury and Carrick, before reaching its eastern terminus at the Bass Highway (N1) just outside of Launceston.

The route serves as a quieter, more scenic alternative to the Bass Highway for travelers between Deloraine and Launceston. The road is an important route for local agriculture and connects various farming communities within the Meander Valley.

== History ==
Meander Valley Road has long been a key road for residents and farmers of northern Tasmania. The highway was officially designated as B54 in the late 20th century to better integrate it with Tasmania's alphanumeric road numbering system.

Historically, the road served as the primary link between Deloraine and Launceston before the construction of the Bass Highway in the 1980s. Meander Valley Road retains its role as a vital local road for accessing the rural communities of the Meander Valley and the rich farmlands surrounding the area.

== Upgrades ==
Various sections of Meander Valley Road have been subject to improvements over the years to enhance safety and traffic flow. These include resurfacing and shoulder-widening projects in response to increased usage by heavy vehicles, particularly those related to the agricultural and dairy industries in the region.

== Major intersections ==
- Deloraine: Highland Lakes Road: roundabout and start of Meander Valley Road
- Exton: Exton Road
- Westbury: Birralee Road / William Street
- Hagley: Hagley Station Lane
- nearby Hagley: Westwood Road
- nearby Carrick: Whitemore Road
- Carrick: Oaks Road
- Carrick: Bishopsbourne Road
- Between Carrick and Hadspen: Illawarra Road: T interchange
- nearby Hadspen: Westwood Road
- Travellers Rest: Bass Highway / Pateena Road
- Prospect Vale: Westbury Road: End of Meander Valley Road.

== See also ==
- Highways in Australia
- Highways in Tasmania
- Meander Valley Council
