= City of Brighton =

City of Brighton may refer to:

- City of Brighton (South Australia)
- City of Brighton (Victoria), Australia
- City of Brighton and Hove, East Sussex, England
  - Brighton, town in England

== See also ==
- Brighton (disambiguation)
