= Evandale, Tasmania =

Evandale
- Town
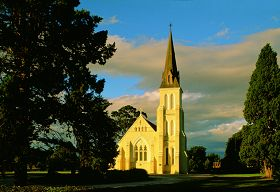
- St. Andrews Church, Evandale

- Coordinates: 41.570171°S 147.246680°E
- Country: Australia
- State: Tasmania
- LGA: Northern Midlands Council
- Location: 8 km (5.0 mi) from Perth; 18 km (11 mi) from Launceston
- Established: 1809

Government
  - State electorate: Lyons
  - Federal division: Lyons

Population
  - Total: 1,345 (2016 census)
- Postcode: 7212

Evandale is an historic town in northern Tasmania, Australia. It sits on the banks of the South Esk River, 18 km south of Launceston. Named after early colonial explorer and Surveyor-General George Evans, the town is famous for its late-Georgian and early-Victorian buildings with relatively untouched streetscape, a popular Sunday market and as a host to the annual national Penny Farthing Bicycle Championships. At the 2016 census, Evandale had a population of 1,345.

Evandale hosts a primary school, churches, parks, pubs, shops and a fire station. Nearby locations include Nile, Deddington and Perth.

== History ==
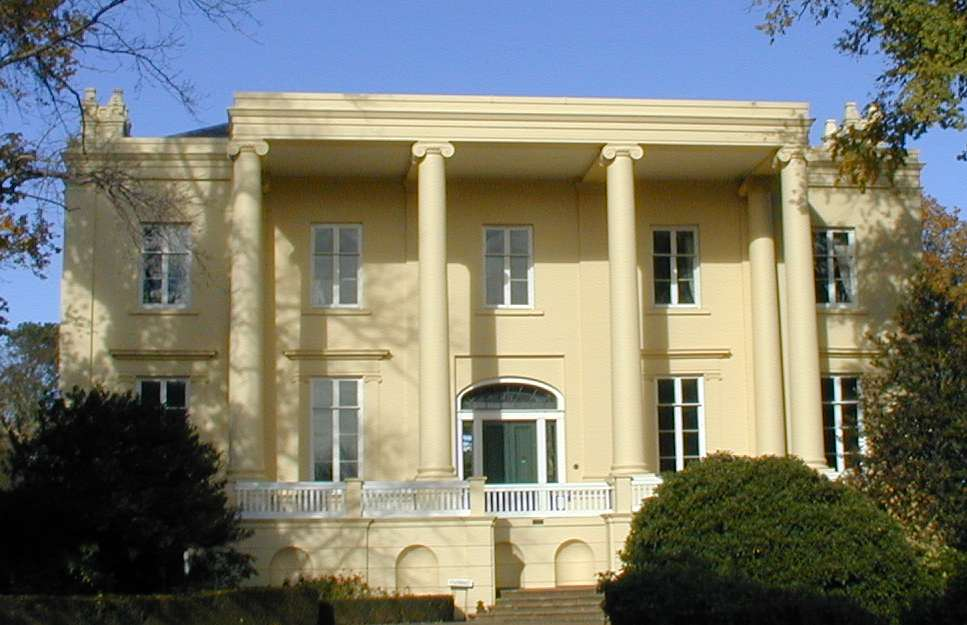
Clarendon House, just outside Evandale, was built in 1836 and is registered by the National Trust

=== Aboriginal inhabitants of the Evandale area ===
The first inhabitants of the present site of Evandale were Tasmanian Aborigines (Palawa). The site lies at the interface of lands originally belonging to the Ben Lomond and North Midlands Nations (most likely the Panninher Clan). The ethnographic record in regards to Aboriginal populations in the North Midlands of Tasmania is scanty, as many of the original inhabitants were displaced or did not survive the first colonial occupation of the South Esk Valley in the early 1800s. However, archaeological remains of Palawa campsites and artifacts existed on the river flats just below the present site of Evandale (now Honeysuckle Banks) and also at Native Point, 2 km downstream, which was a known 'resort of the natives'. The Evandale region also appears to have encompassed an Aboriginal route from the Tamar Valley to the Lake River and it is likely that this area was a hunting ground and meeting point for local clans of the North Midlands Nation.

As with first contact in other areas of Tasmania, relations with the first settlers were often peaceable. The settler David Gibson was reported to have left out slaughtered stock for aborigines to roast (or at least to feed their hunting dogs). This may have been an example of payment for occupation or use of clan hunting grounds.

Relations with European settlers soured during the 1820s as settler encroachment increased and lethal violence against Aboriginal clans was permitted by lax colonial policy. Seasonal passage through the midlands was hindered by opportunistic attacks from stockmen, such as the 'outrages' recorded against women of the Leterremairrener clan at Patersons Plains, north of Evandale, and also from larger scale organised assault by settlers, constabulary and military; which led to massacres at Norfolk Plains in the west and Campbelltown in the south. The Aboriginal clans were severely depleted during this time but actively began a campaign of guerilla attacks on settlers in the Midlands region which became known as the Black War.

During the Black War, in the 1820-1830s, members of the Stoney Creek (Tyerrernotepanner) Clan of the North Midlands Nation, with remnant members of the Ben Lomond Nation, continued to make raids on farms south of Evandale and further up the South Esk River, but by then traditional tribal life in the Evandale region had long since vanished and the remnant people of this area retreated to lands to the North East, were waging a desperate guerilla campaign, or were living a fringe existence in Launceston.

=== Colonial history of Evandale ===
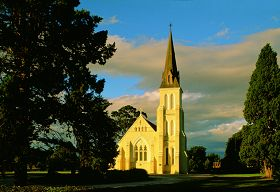
St Andrew's Anglican Church, Evandale

The modern town of Evandale was founded as Honeysuckle Banks by Governor Lachlan Macquarie, who camped on the riverbank below the current site of Evandale when passing through the region in 1811. At this stage the only settler in the region was David Gibson, who received a grant of land in 1809 at Pleasant Banks 4 km upstream and across the river. He built a two-story wooden house in 1817 that survived as the oldest house in the region until it was burned down in 1915.

In the first two decades of the 19th century, settlement in the Midlands progressed up the South and North Esk rivers from Launceston and the Evandale region consisted of fertile alluvial flats already partially cleared for hunting purposes by Aboriginal fire stick burning. Bush existed south of the future site of Evandale in the 'Black Forest', on the Gordon Plains towards Nile, and on surrounding foothills of the Ben Lomond Tier, but the plains and river flats were attractive sites for grazing and cropping.

The first true European settler in modern Evandale was the Scottish mariner Captain Andrew Barclay, who was granted 500 acres (2.0 km^{2}) of land north of the present site of Evandale in 1816, and another 300 acres (121 ha) the next year. On this he built 'Trafalgar', originally a 4 roomed brick cottage and now the oldest surviving building in the region. In 1824, he built the now-demolished homestead of 'Cambock' on the village's outskirts, noted for its bell tower to warn workers of fire or impending attack from aborigines or bushrangers. Barclay continued acquiring land in the surrounding district and by 1828 was considered the largest owner of good land on the island. The names of roads like Barclay Street, Cambock Lane, and Trafalgar Lane mark his influence. He died in 1839.

George Collins was granted land at the southern aspect of present-day Evandale (still called Collins Hill) in the 1820s. His land lay from the South Esk up the hill to encompass the current site of Evandale. During the 1820s further land grants were made at Logan, White Hills and up the South Esk towards Nile and Deddington.

Settlement, and its accompanying infrastructure, was facilitated by free labour from the convict economy of the time and the houses, roads, fences and much of the land clearing was from the labour of assigned men. Roads had been surveyed and established to Launceston, via Nile and Deddington to Avoca and south to Campbell Town. The roads were described as better than those in England (excepting near the approaches to Launceston).

The town of Evandale was progressively built on land previously belonging to Collins and Barclay from the 1820s and it was around this time that free land grants ceased. The 1820s were a violent period, with depredations from bushrangers and aborigines a constant threat to outlying farms and to travellers. The Brady Gang were involved in a shoot out at nearby Glendessary and the murderer and bushranger Jeffries was captured by John Batman, Anthony Cottrell and the Aboriginal William 'Black Bill' Ponsonby at Jeffries Creek, near modern-day Logan Road.

Anthony Cottrell was the Constable and Poundkeeper (stock controller) at Gordon Plains just south of Evandale when he was raided by hostile Aboriginal clansmen in 1827 and it was no surprise that stockmen were rarely seen without a musket at hand. The law at the time was executed by military and appointed constables with the gentry, or senior military, officiating as magistrates. Military posts were established upstream at Glen Esk, downstream at the Perth punt and at Campbell Town, primarily as defence against the Aboriginal threat.

Evandale naturally grew on land suitable for permanent habitation on a plateau above the banks of the South Esk River. The area was originally named Honeysuckle Banks after the camp made by Macquarie in his traverse of Tasmania in 1811 and thereafter the emerging town was named New River (eponymously from the early name for the Esk) and then known as Collin's Hill in the 1820s. The town (and region) was officially known as Morvern, after the original surveyed site for a town some 3 km south of the current town - a site unsuitable due to lack of permanent water. The town was renamed Evansdale in 1829, after the surveyor George William Evans, and then Evandale in 1836.

The incongruity of the town being sited 3 km away from its officially named and surveyed boundaries was reconciled when new town boundaries were circumscribed and the town and region were officially recognised as Evandale by Governor Denison in 1848. Many continued to call it Morven beyond mid-century, including in official contexts and in newspaper articles. The name Morven is retained in the name of the local recreation ground, 'Morven Park', which is used for football and cricket.

The 1830s saw the beginning of a proposed water supply scheme from the South Esk at Evandale via tunnel, viaduct and aqueduct to Launceston, which regularly suffered diminishment of supply in summer. Tunnel works were begun on the western and southern slopes of the hill but the scheme never reached fruition as the engineering proved too difficult and had resulted in the death of a tunneller.

The first inn was recorded as opening in 1832, the New River, which was later rebuilt as the Patriot King William the Fourth - later renamed the Blenheim, now Blenheim House. Another old tavern was the Ingleside, now rebuilt as the Ingleside bakery. The oldest public house still trading is the Prince of Wales Hotel, which was built in 1836 and first licensed in 1842, although it has been substantially altered from the original. Evandale Post Office opened on 1 June 1835 and remains a fine old building.

In 1835, sixty-six of the leading citizens petitioned the governor to appoint a clergyman to the district. Governor John Franklin came to lay the foundation stone of the first church in 1838, which also served as a schoolroom. St. Mary's Catholic Church, built in 1863, is the oldest wooden Catholic Church in the South Pacific.

In 1876, the Tasmanian Main Line Company opened a narrow (1,067 mm) gauge line from Hobart to Evandale where it connected with the broad (1,600 mm) gauge Launceston and Western Railway from Launceston and Deloraine, built in 1871. It remained a break-of-gauge station until the Evandale-Deloraine line was converted to narrow gauge in 1888.

Evandale's Old School, built in 1889 and extended in 1929, now serves as an information and community centre.

== Statues in Evandale ==
Numerous statues are found in Evandale including:

- Harry Murray in Memorial Park (highly decorated World War I soldier)
- An anonymous penny-farthing rider on the corner of Russell and Scone Streets
- John Glover in Falls Park

== Notable people from Evandale ==
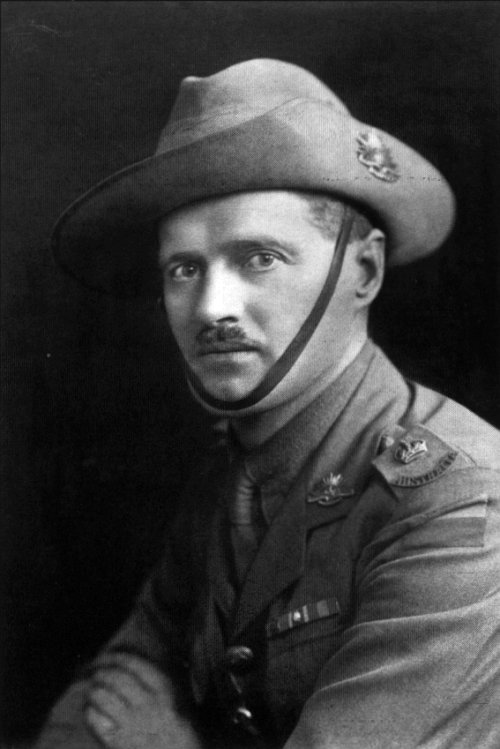
Major Harry Murray, World War I, Victoria Cross recipient

- Steve Biddulph - parenting author
- Bob Cheek - former State Opposition leader
- John Glover - landscape artist
- Hollie Grima - Australian women's basketballer
- Nathan Grima - Australian Football League (A.F.L) Player (North Melbourne Kangaroos)
- Susan Irvine - author and rosarian
- Harry Murray - the most highly decorated infantry soldier of the British Empire during the First World War

== The Evandale region in popular culture ==
Evandale was the featured location in an episode of the popular ABC TV program Back Roads, which originally aired in November 2024. The Roving party, a book written by Rohan Wilson, provides a fictional account of John Batman and William 'Black Bill' Ponsonby during the Black War.
