= Perth, Tasmania =

Perth
- Town
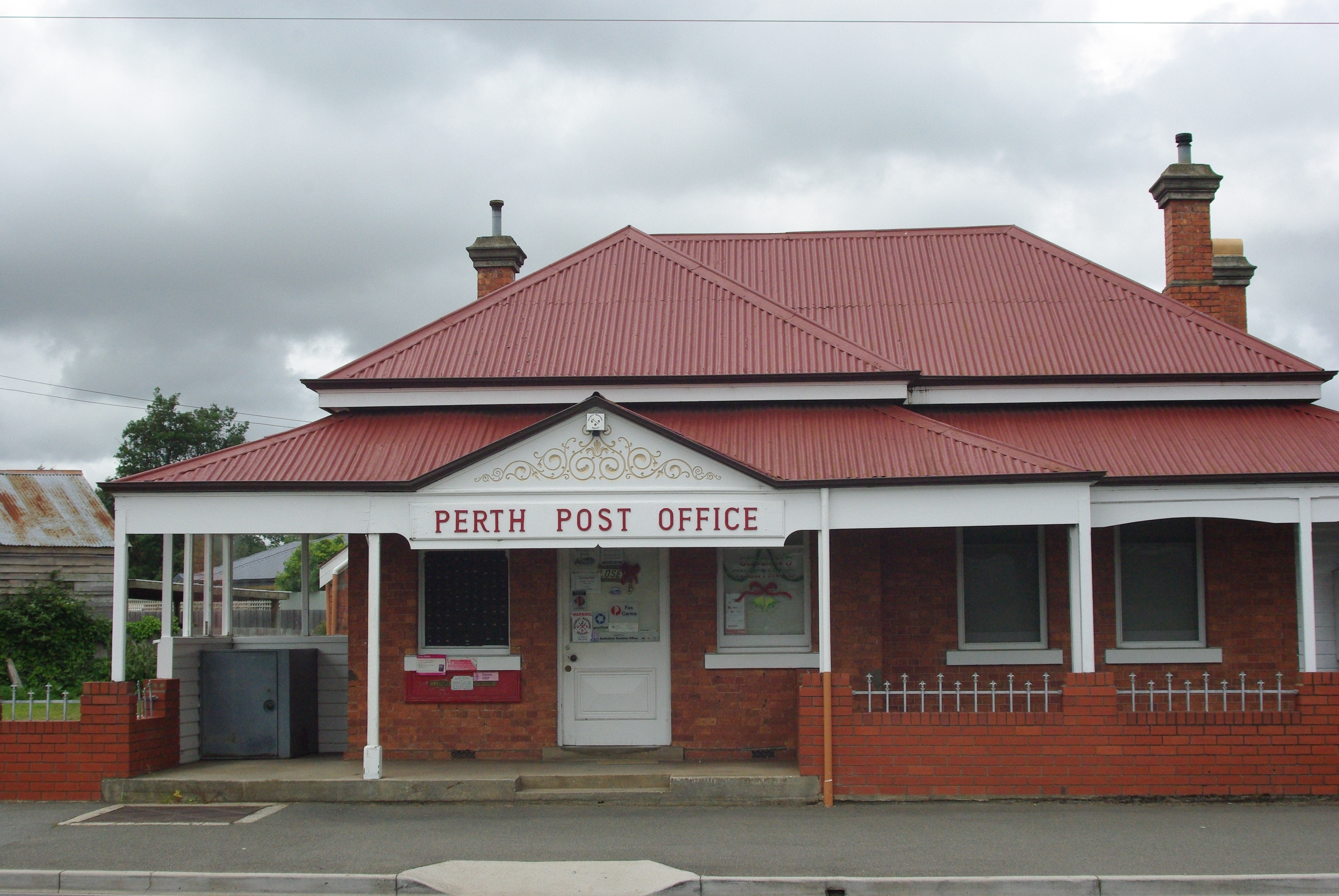
- Post office in Perth, Tasmania

- Coordinates: 41°34′23″S 147°10′17″E
- Country: Australia
- State: Tasmania
- LGA: Northern Midlands Council
- Location: 182 km (113 mi) N of Hobart; 100 km (62 mi) SE of Devonport; 17 km (11 mi) S of Launceston; 50 km (31 mi) NNW of Campbell Town
- Established: 1821

Government
  - State electorate: Lyons
  - Federal division: Lyons
- Elevation: 164 m (538 ft)

Population
  - Total: 3,233 (UCL 2021)
- Postcode: 7300
Localities around Perth
Carrick	Devon Hills	Western Junction
Longford	Perth	Evandale
Longford	Powranna	Powranna

Perth is a town on the Australian island of Tasmania. It lies 20 km (12 mi) south of Launceston, on the Midland Highway. The town had a population of 3,233 at the 2021 census, and is part of the Northern Midlands Council.

Like nearby Longford, Perth is a historic town with many buildings dating back to the early 19th century. It is the first major town out of Launceston on the route to Hobart, and also serves as a major junction for people bypassing Launceston on the route from Hobart to the northwest of the state.

== History ==
Perth was settled in 1821 by Governor Lachlan Macquarie. He was staying nearby with the pastoralist David Gibson and named it after Gibson's hometown of Perth, Scotland. It was proclaimed as a township in 1836. John Skinner Prout painted a view of the town in 1845, with various parts of the inland mountains showing in the painting. Edward Paxham Brandard engraved the picture in 1874.

In June 2020, the bypass for Perth was opened to traffic which directs the Midland Highway traffic away from the Town centre, same with Illawarra Road which previously went on Drummond Street.

== Landmarks ==
=== Baptist church ===
The Perth Baptist church, opened in 1862, is notable, due to its history, size and architecture.

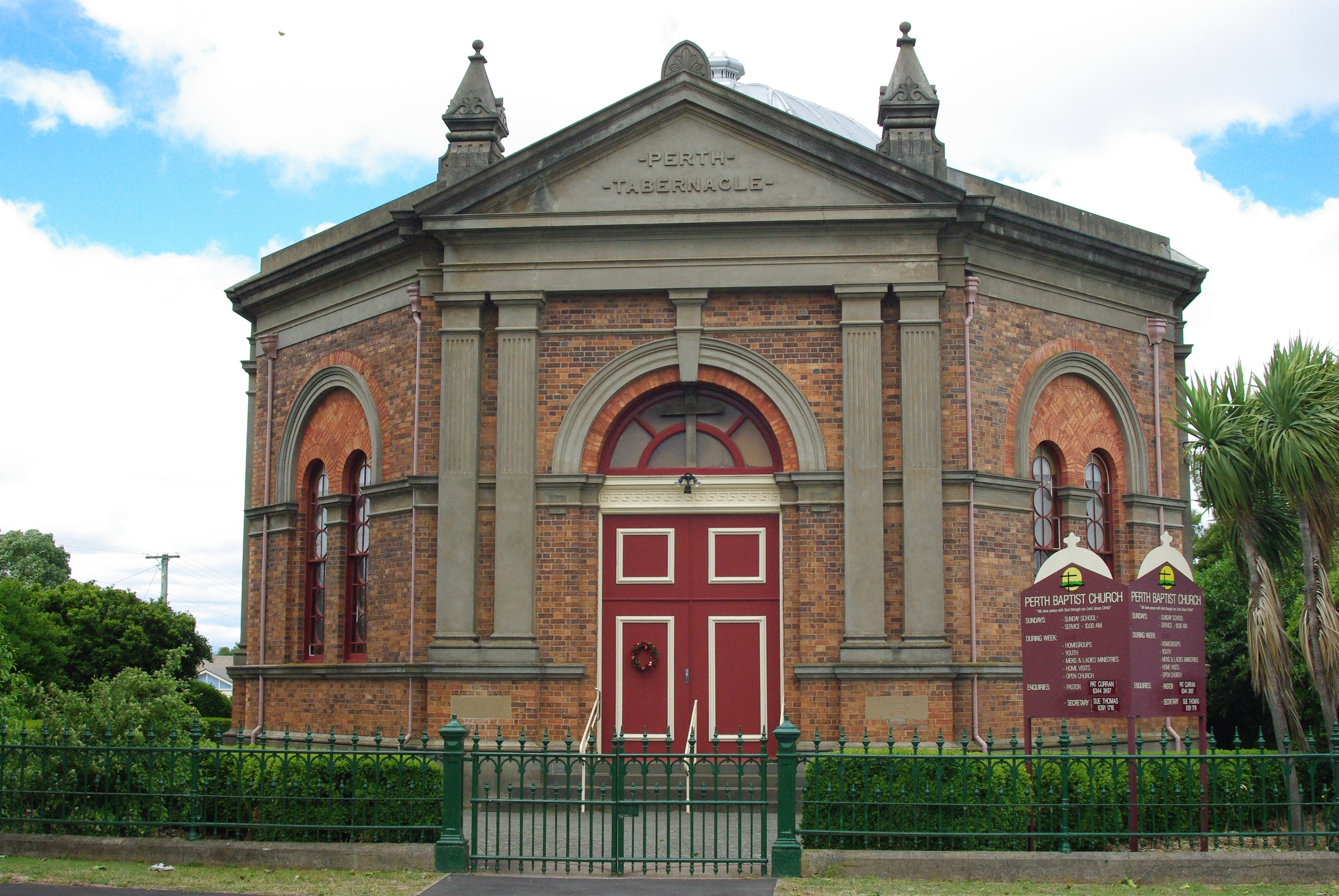
Perth Baptist church

=== Gibbet Hill ===
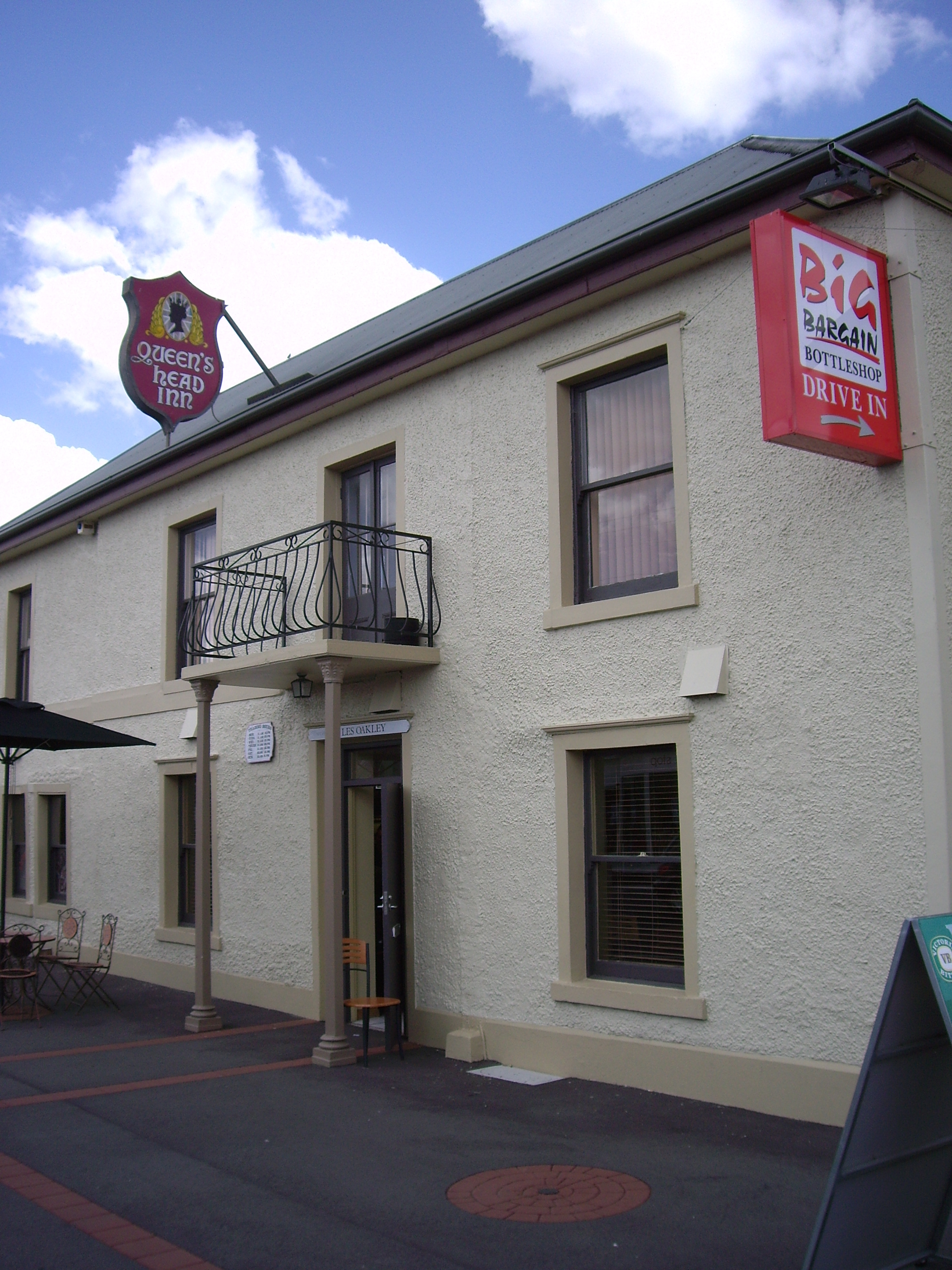
Queen's Head Inn, Perth Tasmania

In 1837, five years after the practice ceased in England, the body of John McKay was gibbeted near the spot where he murdered Joseph Wilson near Perth. There was great outcry, but the body was not removed until an acquaintance of Wilson passed the spot and, horrified by the spectacle of McKay's rotting corpse, pleaded with the authorities to remove it.

The location is still marked by a sign reading, "Gibbet Hill" on the right when heading to Launceston.

This was the last case of gibbeting in a British colony.

== Demographics ==
The population of Perth was 2,965 in the 2016 Census. It had grown to 3,233 people in the 2021 Census.
