= Northern Midlands Council =

- Local government area
- Interactive map of Northern Midlands Council
- Coordinates: 41.8402°S 147.4609°E
- Country: Australia
- State: Tasmania
- Region: Northern midlands
- Established: 2 April 1993
- Council seat: Longford

Government
  - Mayor: Mary Knowles
  - State electorate: Lyons
  - Federal division: Lyons

Area
  - Total: 5,135 km^{2} (1,983 sq mi)
- Website: Northern Midlands Council
LGAs around Northern Midlands Council
Meander Valley	Launceston	Break O'Day
Central Highlands	Northern Midlands Council	Glamorgan Spring Bay
Central Highlands	Southern Midlands	Glamorgan Spring Bay

Northern Midlands Council is a local government body in Tasmania, extending south of Launceston into the northern region of the Tasmanian central midlands. Northern Midlands is classified as a rural local government area and has a population of 13,300, the major population centres and localities of the region include Campbell Town, Evandale, Longford, and Perth.

== History and attributes ==
On 2 April 1993, the municipalities of Campbell Town, Evandale, Fingal, Longford and Ross were amalgamated to form the Northern Midlands Council. Northern Midlands is classified as rural, agricultural and very large under the Australian Classification of Local Governments.

== Localities ==
Locality	Census population 2011	Reason
Evandale	1402	
Longford	3756	Includes Bishopsbourne, Toiberry, Wilmores Lane, Pateena, Illawarra
Campbell Town	994	
Perth	2635 *	* Missing from ABS
Bishopsbourne		Incl. in Longford
Toiberry		Incl. in Longford
Wilmores Lane		Incl. in Longford
Pateena		Incl. in Longford
Breadalbane		Incl. in Western Junction
Devon Hills	476	
Western Junction	298	Includes Breadalbane
Clarendon		Incl. in Conara
Deddington	77	Includes Blessington,English Town
Nile		Incl. in Conara
Blessington		Incl. in Deddington
English Town		Incl. in Deddington
Storys Creek		Incl. in Avoca
Rossarden		Incl. in Avoca
Avoca	300	Includes Storys Creek, Rossarden, Royal George, LLewellyn, Frodberry (Break O'Day Council)
Royal George		Incl. in Avoca
Lake Leake		
Tooms Lake		Incl. in Ross
Ross	423	Includes Tooms Lake, Auburn
Auburn		Incl. in Ross
Delmont		Incl. in Cressy
Poatina		Incl. in Cressy
Blackwood Creek		Incl. in Cressy
Cressy	1403	Includes Delmont, Poatina, Blackwood Creek, Millers Bluff
Epping Forest		Incl. in Conara
Conara	484	Includes Epping Forest, Cleveland, Clarendon, Nile, Powrana, Barton
Cleveland		Incl. in Conara
LLewellyn		Incl. in Avoca
Tunbridge		Incl. in Ross
Powranna		Incl. in Conara
Barton		Incl. in Conara
Millers Bluff		Incl. in Cressy
Illawarra		Incl. in Longford
Total	12,228	
Local government total	12,228	Gazetted Northern Midlands local government area

=== Not in above list ===
- Ben Lomond
- Bracknell
- Interlaken
- Lake Sorell
- Lemont
- Liffey
- Relbia
- Travellers Rest
- White Hills
- Youngtown

== See also ==
- List of local government areas of Tasmania
