= Longford, Tasmania =

Longford
- Town
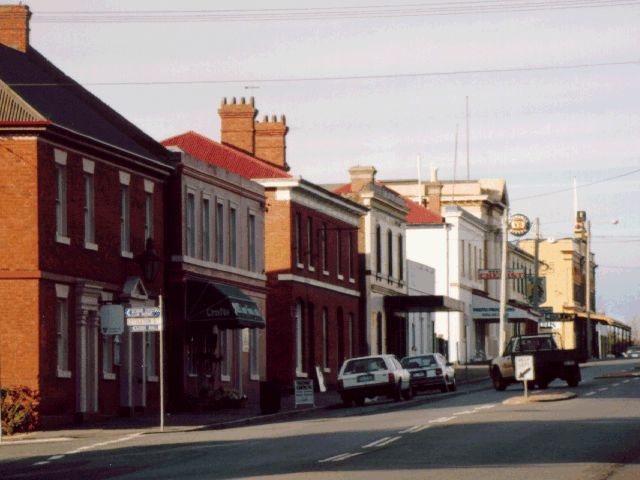
- Wellington Street, Longford looking south

- Coordinates: 41°35′45.05″S 147°7′18.52″E
- Country: Australia
- State: Tasmania
- LGA: Northern Midlands Council
- Location: 6 km (3.7 mi) from Perth (town, not city); 11 km (6.8 mi) from Cressy; 21 km (13 mi) from Launceston
- Established: 1813

Government
  - State electorate: Lyons
  - Federal division: Lyons

Population
  - Total: 3,863 (2016 census)
- Postcode: 7301

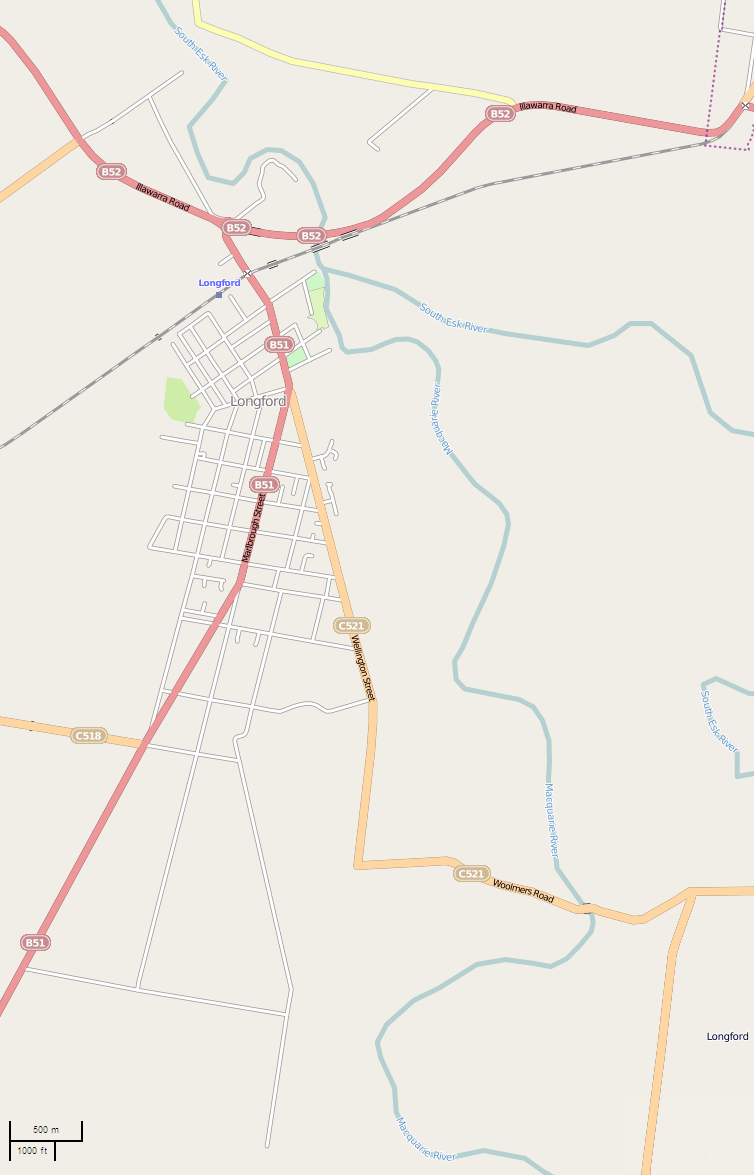
Street map of Longford

Longford is a town in the northern midlands of Tasmania, Australia. It lies 145 m above sea level at the convergence of the Macquarie River and the South Esk River, 21 km south of Launceston and a 15-minute drive from the airport. It is just south of the Illawarra Road, a road connecting the Bass and Midland Highways. It has a population of 3,863 (2016 census) and is part of the Northern Midlands Council area. The region is predominantly agricultural, noted for wool, dairy produce and stock breeding.

== History ==
=== Pre-European settlement ===
The Longford region was the traditional land of The Panninher (par-nin-her) clan of the North Midlands Nation. This clan was known as the Penny Royal Creek Tribe by colonials, named after the old European name for the Liffey River (Aboriginal: Tellerpangger). The Panninher occupied land from Drys Bluff to the Tamar, Evandale and south to the Conara region. The Norfolk Plains region was the site of hunting and the boundary of the Aboriginal road from the Liffey River valley to the Lake River Valley and thence to the Central Highlands.

=== Settlement ===
In 1806 the first Europeans, Jacob Mountgarrett and Ensign Hugh Piper, passed through the area, and in the following year Lieutenant Thomas Laycock camped near the current site of the town during his overland journey from Launceston to Hobart.

Settlers started to arrive in 1807 as farmers were moved from Norfolk Island to Van Diemen's Land (the original name used by Europeans for Tasmania). Governor Macquarie granted land rights to the settlers, who originally called the area Norfolk Plains. The town, originally called Latour, grew up around the hotel (later known as the Longford Hotel) which was built in 1827 by Newman Williatt. In 1833 the town was renamed Longford, probably at the suggestion of the land commissioner Roderic O'Connor.

Settlers used free convict labour to build some fine houses and estates.

Prominent among the early settlers, the Archer family built a number of grand houses and estates in the area. Thomas Archer emigrated from England to Australia in 1811, and retired from government service in 1821 to develop his 2,000-acre (8.1 km^{2}) estate. By 1825 he held 6,000 acres (24 km^{2}) in the area and his success persuaded first his brother Joseph, then his brothers Willam and Edward and their father, to join him.

Together they farmed and developed the land, and built a number of homesteads which are among the finest in northern Tasmania: Woolmers Estate, Brickendon Estate (both on the Australian National Heritage List), Panshanger, Northbury, Fairfield, Cheshunt, Woodside, Palmerston and Saundridge. Six generations of Archers have lived in Woolmers, from 1817 to 1994; it is now owned by the Woolmers Foundation Inc and is open to the public.

Norfolk Plains Post Office opened on 1 June 1832 and was renamed Longford in 1856. It is named after County Longford in Ireland.

Adjacent to a 21st-century recreation ground is the remains of a dam. This dam, known as the Longford Mill Dam, was built in the 1840s by John Badcock to power a flour Mill at nearby Newry.

=== Historic buildings ===
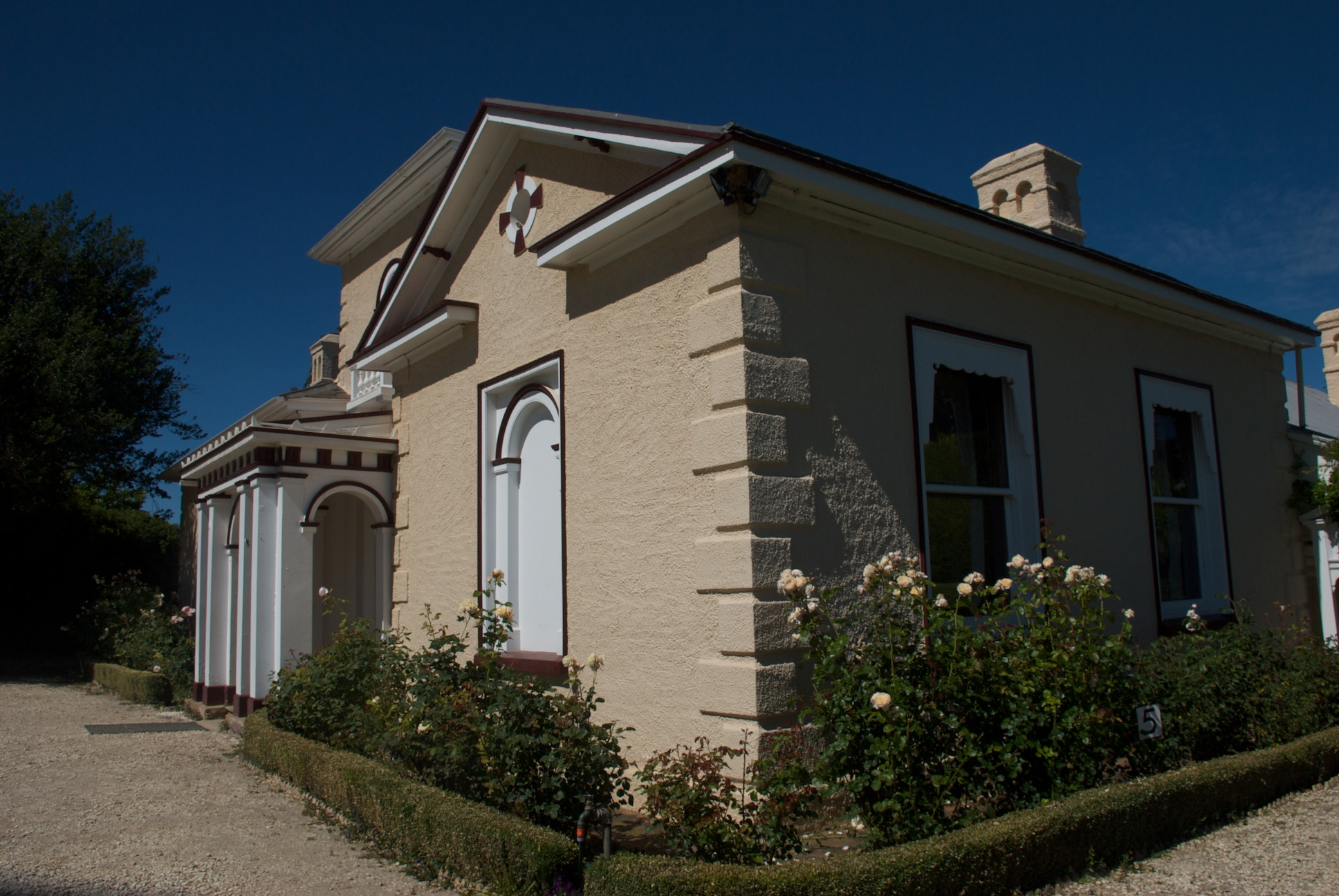
Woolmers, near Longford

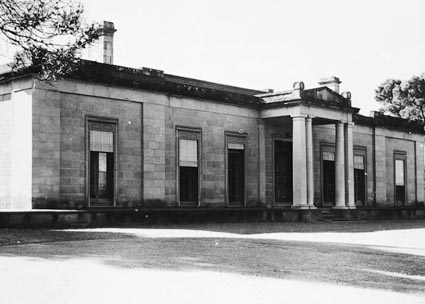
Panshanger, near Longford

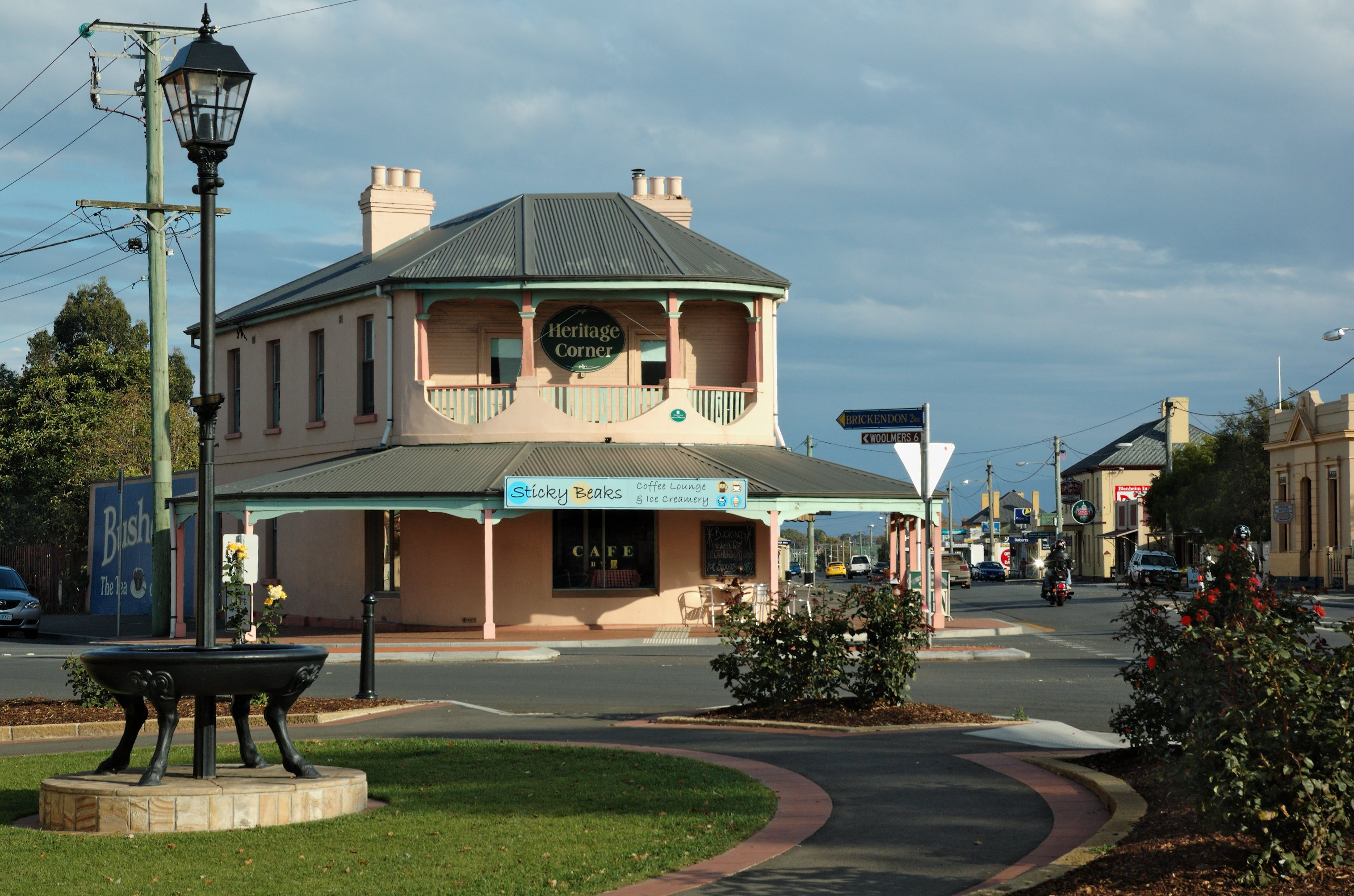
Heritage Corner, from the early 1830s

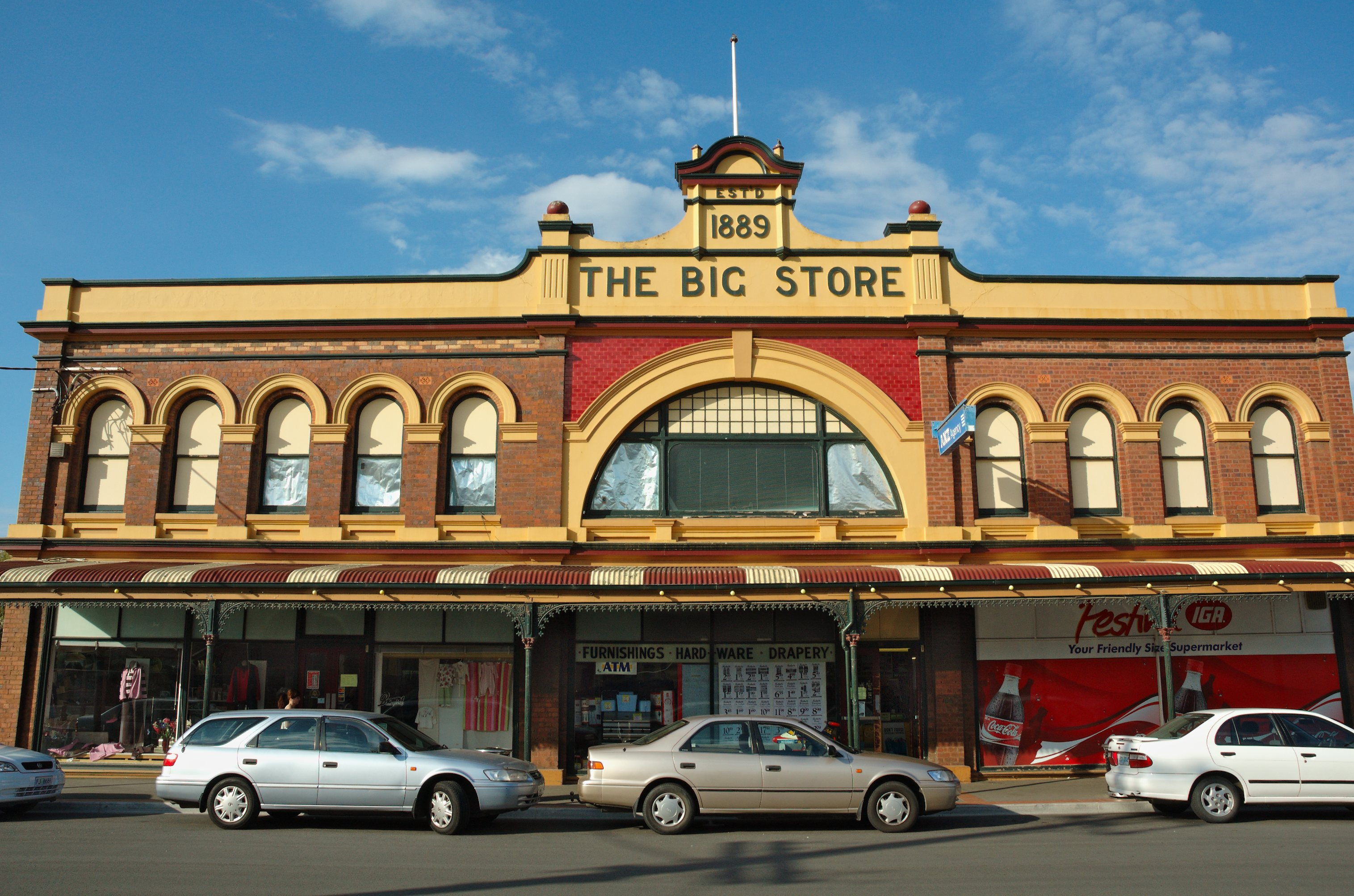
Brown's Big Store, 1889

Longford district has many buildings included on the Tasmanian Heritage Register. Many significant historic buildings were constructed between 1830 and 1850, including:

- Christ Church (1839), sandstone, with square tower, lancet windows and buttresses, in the Old Colonial Gothick Picturesque style. The church clock and bell were both gifts from King George IV. The cemetery includes many prominent local families including the Archer, Brumby and Reiby families. The land on which it stands is named Illawarra because of Lucy Margaretta Davey, the daughter of Lt Governor Mad Tom Davey.
- Queen's Arms Hotel (1835), a double-storey brick and stuccoed building in the Old Colonial Georgian style
- Blenheim Hotel (1846), a two-storey Georgian brick and stuccoed building and a major townscape element in Longford
- Tattersalls Hotel (now Longford Library) (c. 1846), a two-storey red brick corner building with neo-classic moulded surrounds to doorways
- The Racecourse Hotel (1838) (former), a two-storey brick Georgian coaching inn, originally built to become the railway station for Longford; has also been a private hospital. It is now a B&B.
- Longford Railway Bridge, a bridge of 120 metres (390 ft) opened in 1871 and which crosses the South Esk River.

== Facilities ==
Longford has a Service Tasmania shop, supermarkets, a bakery, a butcher's shop, two banks, a post office, antique shops, hotels, cafés, take-aways, hairdressers and service stations. A kindergarten and large primary school provide education for younger children; secondary students travel to the District High School in Cressy or to one of the schools in Launceston.

The town has a sports centre and a bowls club. Two local bus companies provide transport to school and to Launceston. Longford public library is part of the State Library of Tasmania's statewide public library network and is open every weekday.

Healthcare is provided by local doctors and dentists. Toosey Memorial Hospital provided private healthcare from the 1920s and became a public hospital in 1950. However, in 1990 it became a residential care centre for elderly people, and the nearest hospital is now in Launceston.

== Employment ==
In the 2006 census, the most common industries of employment for Longford residents were:

- 7.2% – sheep, beef cattle and grain farming
- 4.5% – school education
- 3.5% – meat and meat product manufacturing
- 2.9% – residential care services
- 2.5% – foad freight transport

=== Local businesses ===
Swift Australia (Southern) Pty Limited runs Longford abattoir, and is one of the state's largest regional employers. The plant processes 450 beef and 1500 smallstock per day and employs 460. Tasmania is the only Australian state that has banned the use of Hormonal Growth Promotants (HGPs) in cattle, so the plant guarantees its products are free of HGP.

Selborne Biological Services runs a biotechnology manufacturing facility in Longford, producing bovine serum and other blood products such as polyclonal antisera and protein fractions, destined for the biotech, pharmaceutical, veterinary, and diagnostics industries. They take advantage of the fact that Tasmania is free of BSE and scrapie. For the same reasons, International Therapeutic Proteins has farms with manufacturing facility for antitoxins and other biologics in Longford.

Koppers Inc has a wood treatment plant in Longford. The company produces treated wood poles, piling timbers and other timber for outdoor use.

Other local employers include Longford Brickworks, an Agricultural Machinery business called Agline, Longford Sawmill, and service industry jobs. Many people commute to work in Launceston.

== Recreation ==
=== Racecourse ===
The Longford Racecourse is the oldest continuously operating racecourse in Australia. Longford is home to many horse studs and training facilities, and the Longford races are held annually on New Year's Day, with thoroughbred horse racing and the Elders Webster Longford Cup.

=== Longford Show ===
The annual Longford Show was first held in 1858 and is one of the longest running rural shows in Australia. Held in October, it attracts between 7000 and 8000 people. It includes equestrian events, poultry and dog shows, chopping and tree felling, sheep and fleeces, rides and games, as well as displays of artwork from local schools.

=== Longford motor racing circuit ===
From 1953 to 1968, two Australian Grand Prix, several Tasman Cup races and touring car and motorcycle championship were organized on the 4.5 miles (7.2 km) Longford Circuit.

=== Longford Golf Club ===
Longford has a popular golf course south of the town, with eleven holes, seven of which have alternate tees.

=== Woodstock Lagoon Wildlife Sanctuary ===
Woodstock Lagoon Wildlife Sanctuary is a natural wetland area which is a nesting and breeding sanctuary for waterfowl. Its total area is around 160 ha. Jointly owned by Dr Tatiana Petrovsky and brothers Bill and Jamie Cox, the area is now permanently protected under Conservation Covenant under the Protected Areas on Private Land program. Not only are waterfowl and swans provided with a habitat, but numerous other species, including endangered species like the green and gold frog, are thriving there.

== Notable residents ==
=== Born in Longford ===
- Numerous members of the Archer family, politicians and local landowners
- John Lake Allen Arthur, Tasmanian cricketer, was born in Longford in 1847 and died there in 1877
- Richard Flanagan (born 1961), an author, historian and film director
- William Hartnoll (1841–1932), Australian politician
- Sir Norman Henry Denham Henty, KBE (1903–1978), Australian politician
- Mary Stewart Kilgour (1851–1955), suffragist and writer was born in Longford
- Walter Lee, three-time Premier of Tasmania
- David John O'Keefe (1864–1943), Australian politician
- Katharine Parker (1886–1971), an Australian composer, born at Lake River near Longford
- Dame Florence "Flora" Reid GBE (1867–1950), the wife of the Prime Minister of Australia Sir George Reid
- Albert Solomon, one of the Premiers of Tasmania, who was in office from 1912 to 1914
- Raymond Gordon Stokes (1924–2017), a former Australian rules footballer who played with Richmond in the VFL
- Chayce Jones (born 2000), a current Australian rules footballer who is playing with Adelaide in the AFL

=== Died in Longford ===
- Tom Roberts, the Australian impressionist artist, is buried at the bluestone Anglican Church on the Illawarra Road
- Catherine Smith (née Keane), born 19 April 1832 in Castlebar, County Mayo, Ireland, arrived in Van Diemen's Land in 1849. Died in Longford, 1925. Believed to be the last remaining Tasmanian convict of the transportation era at the time of her death.

== See also ==
- Longford (disambiguation)
