= South Esk River =

River in Tasmania, Australia

South Esk
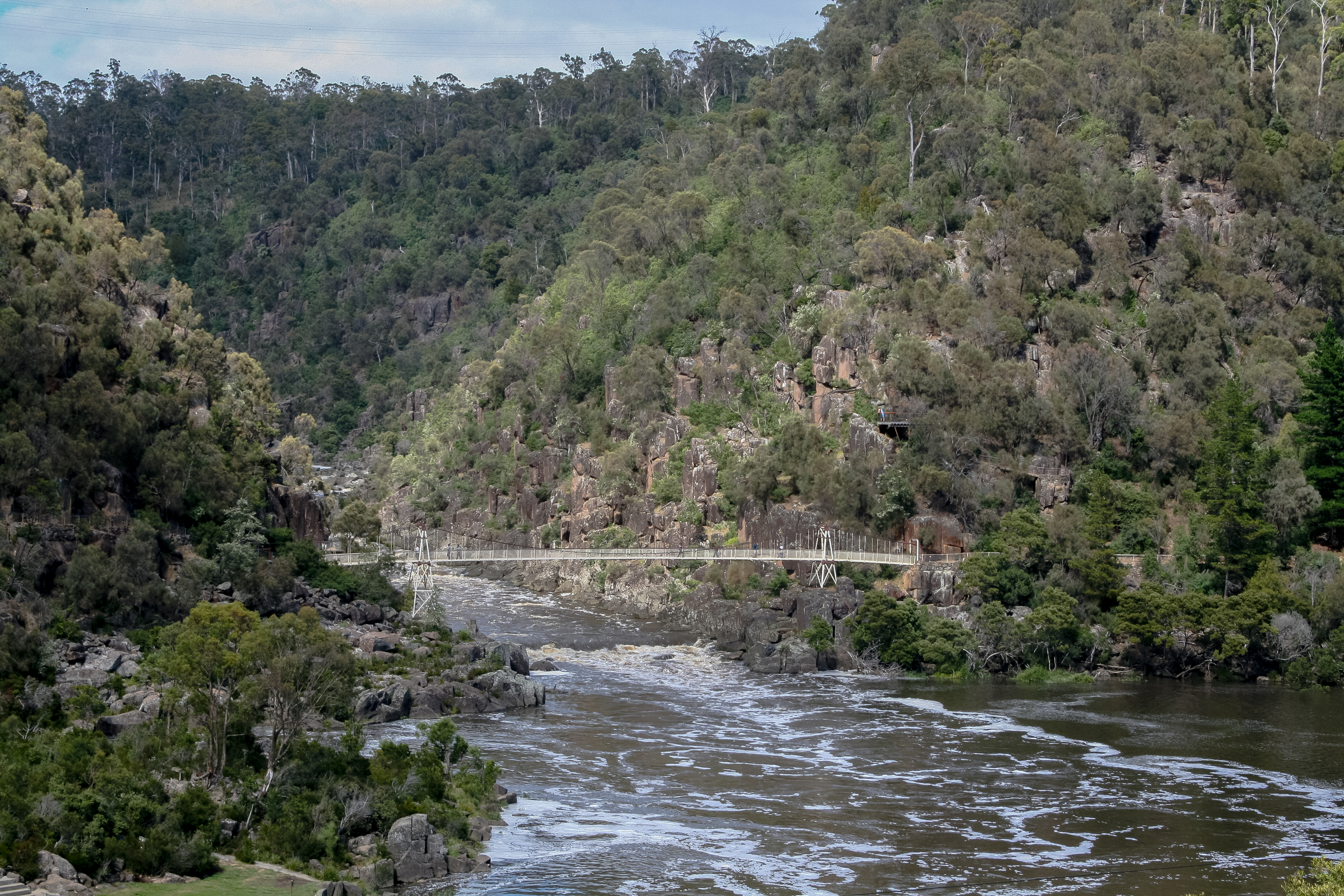
- South Esk River in Launceston

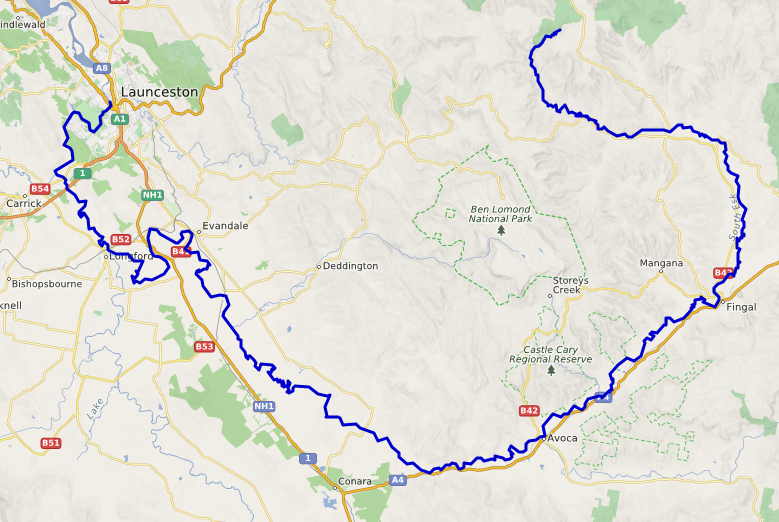
- Native name: plipatumila (palawa kani); mangana lienta; mooronnoe

Location
- Country: Australia
- State: Tasmania
- Region: Northern Tasmania

Physical characteristics
- Source: Ben Lomond
  - location: Mathinna Plains
  - elevation: 810 m (2,660 ft)
- Source confluence: North Esk River
  - location: Trevallyn
  - coordinates: 41°43′16″S 147°13′06″E
  - elevation: 0 m (0 ft)
- Mouth: Tamar River
  - location: Launceston
  - coordinates: 41°27′S 147°07′E
  - elevation: 0 m (0 ft)
- Length: 252 km (157 mi)

Basin features
- River system: Tamar River
- Tributaries
  - left: River Tyne, Break O'Day River, St Pauls River, Meander River
  - right: Nile River, Macquarie River, North Esk River
- Reservoirs: Lake Trevallyn

The South Esk River, the longest river in Tasmania, is a major perennial river located in the northern region of Tasmania, Australia.

== Location and features ==
The South Esk springs from the eastern foothills of the Ben Lomond plateau near Mathinna and the river's course describes an arc around the entire southern promontory of the mountain – running through Fingal, Avoca and Evandale before winding its way northwest through Perth, Longford and Hadspen. The river merges with the tributary Meander River, then flows through the narrows of the Cataract Gorge to finally meet the North Esk River at Launceston. From this confluence arises kanamaluka/Tamar River, which runs to the Bass Strait.

The natural river flow is interrupted by the Trevallyn Dam, near Launceston, constructed as part of the Trevallyn Power Station hydroelectric power scheme. The river is subject to flooding which overflows at Lake Trevallyn to create the spectacle of high rapids coursing through the narrows of the Gorge.

The river's two largest tributaries are the Macquarie and Meander Rivers, with lesser tributaries being the Nile River, River Tyne, Storys Creek and the Break O'Day River – upstream of the junction with the Macquarie. The Meander's main tributaries are the Liffey River and Quamby Brook and the Macquarie's main tributaries are the Lake, Isis, Elizabeth, Blackman, and Tooms rivers. These tributary watercourses drain the entire north Midlands valley, the watersheds of the Western Tiers, Ben Lomond plateau and Eastern Ranges south of Ben Lomond.

== History ==
=== Indigenous history ===
The river is known in palawa kani, the language of Tasmanian Aboriginal people, as plipatumila. Other recorded Tasmanian Aboriginal names for the river are mangana lienta (from the word menanyer meaning 'large stream' and liena – either fresh water or related to a word for the Fingal Valley) and mooronnoe, the northern reach around modern day Hadspen.

The South Esk River runs through, and forms the borders of, traditional lands of two nations of the Palawa. The Ben Lomond Nation occupied territory enclosed by the river's western and southern stretches and occupied the entire upper reaches as far as its northern watershed. The Panninher, Tyrernotepanner and Leterremairrener clans of the North Midlands Nation occupied the territories to the west of the river. The Aboriginal clans exploited the hunting grounds alongside the river and took the native freshwater mussel for food.

The river was frequented by Aboriginal people, and remnants of their campsites and toolmaking have been found along the river. The ethnographic record describes particular meeting areas, or 'resorts', on the river, such as Stony Creek, near Llewellyn; Glen Esk (near Nile); Native Point, near Perth; and at Hadspen.

=== European history ===
The river was renamed by Colonel William Paterson in December 1804 after the eponymous Scottish river.

== See also ==
- Rivers of Tasmania
