= Red Hills, Tasmania =

Red Hills
- Town
- Coordinates: 41°31′44″S 146°35′51″E
- Country: Australia
- State: Tasmania
- Region: City of Launceston
- LGA: Meander Valley
- Location: 7 km (4.3 mi) W of Deloraine

Government
  - State electorate: Lyons
  - Federal division: Lyons

Population
  - Total: 120 (2016 census)
- Postcode: 7304
Localities around Red Hills
Dunorlan	Dunorlan	Deloraine
Needles	Red Hills	Deloraine
Needles	Montana	Deloraine

Red Hills is a locality and suburb in the local government area of Meander Valley, in the Launceston region of Tasmania. It is located about 7 kilometres (4.3 mi) west of the town of Deloraine. The Meander River forms part of the south-eastern boundary, while its tributary Western Creek forms the remainder. The railway tracks of the Western line pass through the north-eastern corner of the locality, crossing the B12 route (Mole Creek Road) at Lemana Junction. The 2016 census determined a population of 120 for the state suburb of Red Hills.

== History ==
A hill named Red Hill is within the locality, and the name of the locality may be derived from it.

== Road infrastructure ==
The B12 route (Mole Creek Road) runs south-west from the Bass Highway through the locality and then continues to Mole Creek, from which it provides access to many localities.
