= Dunorlan, Tasmania =

Dunorlan Tasmania
- Coordinates: 41°30′02″S 146°34′21″E
- Population: 108 (2016 census)
- Postcode(s): 7304
- Location: 43 km (27 mi) SE of Devonport
- LGA(s): Meander Valley
- Region: North West
- State electorate(s): Lyons
- Federal division(s): Lyons
Localities around Dunorlan:
Weegena	Moltema, Elizabeth Town	Elizabeth Town
Weegena	Dunorlan	Deloraine
Chudleigh	Red Hills	Red Hills

Dunorlan is a locality and small rural community in the local government area of Meander Valley in the North West region of Tasmania. It is located about 43 kilometres (27 mi) south-east of the town of Devonport. The 2016 census determined a population of 108 for the state suburb of Dunorlan.

== History ==
The locality was named for Dunorlan Park in England, a property that was developed by Henry Reed, an early settler in the district.

Henry Reed’s Dunorlan estate was located on 2560 acres originally granted in 1829 to Captain William Moriarty who subdivided it into tenant farms in 1846 before selling it prominent Launceston businessman and local landowner, Henry Reed who again subdivided it into tenant farms.

== Geography ==
The Mersey River forms part of the south-west boundary.

== Road infrastructure ==
The C163 route (Bengeo Road) enters the locality from the north-east, runs south through the unbounded locality of Bengeo, and exits to the south-east. The C161 route (Dunorlan Road) starts at an intersection with route C163 and runs west across the locality to the village of Dunorlan. Here it turns north and follows the railway line until it exits. The C160 route (Weegena Road) starts at an intersection in the village and runs west until it exits.
