= Needles, Tasmania =

Needles Tasmania
- Coordinates: 41°32′54″S 146°32′43″E
- Population: 37 (2016 census)
- Postcode(s): 7304
- Location: 56 km (35 mi) SE of Devonport
- LGA(s): Meander Valley
- Region: North West
- State electorate(s): Lyons
- Federal division(s): Lyons
Localities around Needles:
Red Hills	Red Hills	Red Hills
Chudleigh	Needles	Meander
Dairy Plains	Dairy Plains	Montana

Needles is a locality and small rural community in the local government area of Meander Valley in the North West region of Tasmania. It is located about 56 kilometres (35 mi) south-east of the town of Devonport. The 2016 census determined a population of 37 for the state suburb of Needles.

== History ==
The locality was named for Needles Ridge (Note: Assumed to refer to dolerite columns in a part of the Great Western Tiers visible from Needles.) to the south.

== Geography ==
Lobster Rivulet, a tributary of the Mersey River, forms the north-western boundary, while Leiths Creek, a tributary of the Meander River, forms the south-eastern boundary.

== Road infrastructure ==
The B12 route (Mole Creek Road) enters the locality from the north-east and exits to the west. The C168 route (Dairy Plains Road) starts at an intersection with route B12 and exits to the south-west.
