= Jackeys Marsh, Tasmania =

Jackeys Marsh Tasmania
- Coordinates: 41°42′03″S 146°40′13″E
- Population: 40 (2016 census)
- Postcode(s): 7304
- Location: 42 km (26 mi) SW of Westbury
- LGA(s): Meander Valley
- Region: Launceston
- State electorate(s): Lyons
- Federal division(s): Lyons
Localities around Jackeys Marsh:
Meander	Meander, Golden Valley	Golden Valley
Meander	Jackeys Marsh	Golden Valley, Liffey
Meander	Central Plateau	Central Plateau

Jackeys Marsh is a rural locality in the local government area (LGA) of Meander Valley in the Launceston LGA region of Tasmania. The locality is about 42 kilometres (26 mi) south-west of the town of Westbury. The 2016 census recorded a population of 40 for the state suburb of Jackeys Marsh.

== History ==
Jackeys Marsh was gazetted as a locality in 1968.

== Geography ==
The waters of Lake Huntsman and the Meander River form much of the western boundary.

== Road infrastructure ==
Route C167 (Meander Road) passes to the north-west. From there East Meander Road and Jackeys Marsh Road provides access to the locality.
