= Caveside =

- Town
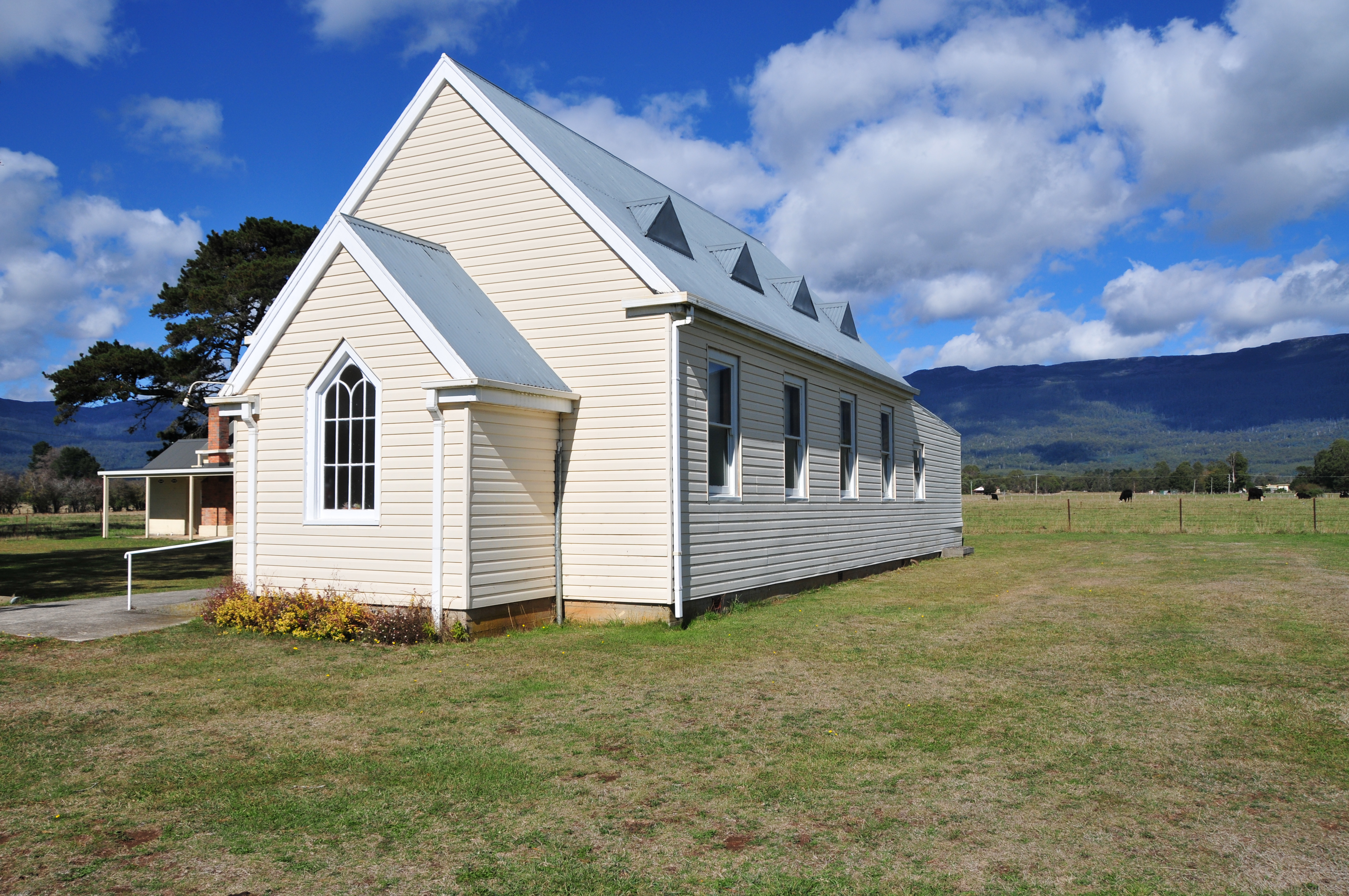
- The "church in the paddock", Caveside's Church of Christ.

- Coordinates: 41°37′S 146°25′E
- Country: Australia
- State: Tasmania
- Region: Launceston
- LGA: Meander Valley Council
- Location: 223 km (139 mi) N of Hobart; 77 km (48 mi) W of Launceston; 70 km (43 mi) S of Devonport; 26 km (16 mi) W of Deloraine; 8 km (5.0 mi) S of Mole Creek

Government
  - State electorate: Lyons
  - Federal division: Lyons

Population
  - Total: 133 (2016 census)
- Postcode: 7304
Localities around Caveside
Mole Creek	Mole Creek, Chudleigh	Dairy Plains
Mole Creek	Caveside	Western Creek, Dairy Plains
Central Plateau	Central Plateau Conservation Area	Western Creek

Caveside is a rural locality in the local government area of Meander Valley in the Launceston region of Tasmania. The locality is about 45 kilometres (28 mi) south-west of the town of Westbury. It lies between the Great Western Tiers to the south and Mole Creek to the north. The 2016 census recorded a population of 133 for the state suburb of Caveside.

Caveside is a small community within an agricultural area, rather than a town. The town lies in an area of limestone; erosion of this has led to the surrounding land being riddled with caves. To the west are two undeveloped cave complexes, Wet Caves and Honeycomb Caves, which are an attraction to cavers. The ground is pitted with sinkholes, a danger to the cattle that graze the fields. The district is probably named after the caves, though until 1897 it was known as Brookside. Prior to settlement what is now developed agricultural land was dense forest. The timber and dairy industries are prominent parts of Caveside's rural history and it was known in the early 20th century for the quality of its cattle and sheep studs.

== History ==
Henry Reed became a significant figure in the early history of Caveside, after he took up a large land allotment in 1835. Reed conducted some early Wesleyan services in his home on the property known as Wesley Dale. He donated the land for the Wesleyan church with the intention that, when it was built, it was to initially be used as a school. The first official Wesleyan services began c.1875 in a private home that was sited in a paddock, near the bridge over Lobster creek. Caveside Wesleyan church, and an associated cottage, was built and completed in 1876. In 1903 the church became the Caveside Methodist church. It was replaced with a brick church in 1978, that is no longer open or used for church services. (Note: There is no church noted as operating in Caveside as of 2015, except for the Church of Christ.)

Caveside had a post office from 1887 operating from a private home. It opened on 1 November and finally closed in 1980. A private school opened, in the Wesleyan church, in Caveside on 4 June 1877 with 27 students. A single-room school building, and associated teacher's residence, was constructed over 1892–93. The school remained (Note: The school was for primary age children in grades 1 through 6.) in this building until 1937 when the school was closed. The school building was moved to Mole Creek in 1938 and used for 'domestic arts' at the Mole Creek district area school.

Additional buildings were constructed on the Methodist church's land. These buildings included a cottage and two buildings used as a shop and a post office. The shop and post office buildings were rented out from c.1900 to c.1940. A hall, noted for its fine timber lining, was built in 1921. A public swimming pool, built with local volunteer labour, opened in 1957. It was extended in 1980 with the addition of a tennis court and in 2001 when gas barbeques were added. (Note: Opening and expansion dates for the Caveside Swimming Pool are recorded on a commemorative sign erected in 2007 by the Caveside Recreation Committee) The pool is a 16-metre (52 ft) outdoor pool and is managed by the Caveside Recreation Committee. The shop has long closed but the Caveside memorial hall remains open and is operated by the Meander Valley Council. The Church of Christ formed an organisation in the area in 1909. Prior to this services had been held in Caveside. They built a hand-split timber church building and opened it in 1911. The original building was moved in 1956 and a replacement built. The building is now known as "The Church in the Paddock".

Caveside was gazetted as a locality in 1965.

== Geography ==
Lobster Rivulet, a tributary of the Mersey River, flows through the locality from south to north.

== Road infrastructure ==
The C169 route (Caveside Road) enters from the north-west and runs through to the north, where it exits. Route C168 (Western Creek Road) starts at an intersection with C169 and runs south-east until it exits.

== Bibliography ==
- Greenhill, Virginia (2002). In the blink of an eye. Westbury: Westbury historical society.
- Reunion Committee for the Reunion of Caveside and Chudleigh Schools and District (1994). As the lobster flows : Caveside-Chudleigh, an historical record. Devonport. ISBN 064618010X.
