= Dairy Plains, Tasmania =

Dairy Plains
- Town
- Coordinates: 41°35′09″S 146°29′47″E
- Country: Australia
- State: Tasmania
- Region: Launceston
- LGA: Meander Valley
- Location: 36 km (22 mi) W of Westbury

Government
  - State electorate: Lyons
  - Federal division: Lyons

Population
  - Total: 69 (2016 census)
- Postcode: 7304
Localities around Dairy Plains
Chudleigh	Needles, Chudleigh	Needles
Chudleigh	Dairy Plains	Montana
Caveside	Western Creek	Meander

Dairy Plains is a rural locality in the local government area (LGA) of Meander Valley in the Launceston LGA region of Tasmania. The locality is about 36 kilometres (22 mi) west of the town of Westbury. The 2016 census recorded a population of 69 for the state suburb of Dairy Plains.

== History ==
Dairy Plains was gazetted as a locality in 1968.

It is an area that was part of the Van Diemen's Land Company holdings.

== Geography ==
The boundaries are mostly survey lines, with small sections of minor watercourses in several places.

== Road infrastructure ==
Route C168 (Dairy Plains Road) runs through from north to south.
