= Montana, Tasmania =

Montana Tasmania
- Coordinates: 41°35′33″S 146°35′02″E
- Population: 56 (2016 census)
- Postcode(s): 7304
- Location: 61 km (38 mi) SE of Devonport
- LGA(s): Meander Valley
- Region: North West
- State electorate(s): Lyons
- Federal division(s): Lyons
Localities around Montana:
| Needles | Red Hills | Deloraine |
| Dairy Plains | Montana | Meander |
| Western Creek | Meander | Meander |

Montana is a locality and small rural community in the local government area of Meander Valley in the North West region of Tasmania. It is located about 61 kilometres (38 mi) south-east of the town of Devonport. The 2016 census determined a population of 56 for the state suburb of Montana.

== History ==
The locality was originally called Cheshunt Park. The name was changed to Montana in 1912.

== Geography ==
The Meander River forms the eastern boundary of the locality.

== Road infrastructure ==
The C166 route (Long Ridge Road) enters the locality from the south-east and exits to the north-east. The C164 route (Montana Road) starts at an intersection with route C166 in the south-east and runs north through the locality and village before exiting.
