= Weegena, Tasmania =

Weegena
- Coordinates: 41°28′09″S 146°28′22″E
- Country: Australia
- State: Tasmania
- Region: North West
- LGA: Meander Valley, Kentish
- Location: 43 km (27 mi) SE of Devonport

Government
  - State electorate: Lyons
  - Federal division: Lyons

Population
  - Total: 89 (SAL 2021)
- Postcode: 7304
Localities around Weegena
Kimberley	Kimberley	Moltema
Lower Beulah	Weegena	Dunorlan
Mole Creek	Chudleigh	Dunorlan

Weegena is a locality and small rural community in the local government areas of Meander Valley and Kentish in the North West region of Tasmania. It is located about 43 kilometres (27 mi) south-east of the town of Devonport.

== History ==
The locality name is believed to mean "campfire" or "fireplace", but other meanings have been suggested. It was previously known as Blackmore. The name was gazetted in 1965.

The 2016 census determined a population of 91 for the state suburb of Weegena. At the 2021 census, the population had decreased to 89.

== Geography ==
The Mersey River passes through the centre of the locality from east to west after forming part of the south-east boundary. It then forms the north-west boundary.

== Road infrastructure ==
The C160 route (Weegena Road) enters the locality from the east, before turning north and exiting. The C159 route (Dynans Bridge Road) starts at an intersection with route C160 and exits to the north-west as it crosses the Mersey River.
