= Moltema, Tasmania =

Moltema Tasmania
- Coordinates: 41°26′37″S 146°31′56″E
- Population: 85 (2016 census)
- Postcode(s): 7304
- Location: 39 km (24 mi) SE of Devonport
- LGA(s): Meander Valley
- Region: North West
- State electorate(s): Lyons
- Federal division(s): Lyons
Localities around Moltema:
Kimberley	Elizabeth Town	Elizabeth Town
Weegena	Moltema	Elizabeth Town
Weegena	Dunorlan	Elizabeth Town

Moltema is a locality and small rural community in the local government area of Meander Valley in the North West region of Tasmania. It is located about 39 kilometres (24 mi) south-east of the town of Devonport. The 2016 census determined a population of 85 for the state suburb of Moltema.

== History ==
The locality was first named Whitefoord Hills but changed to Moltema in 1915. The name is believed to be an Aboriginal word meaning “to run”.

== Geography ==
The Western rail line passes through from south to north, and the Bass Highway skirts the eastern boundary. The Rubicon River forms a small section of the eastern boundary.

== Road infrastructure ==
The B13 route (Railton Road) enters the locality from the south-east and exits to the north. The C161 route (Dunorlan Road) starts at an intersection with route B13 and runs south into Dunorlan.
