= Chudleigh, Tasmania =

Chudleigh
- Town
- Coordinates: 41°33′35″S 146°28′47″E
- Country: Australia
- State: Tasmania
- Region: Launceston
- LGA: Meander Valley Council
- Location: 64 km (40 mi) E of Launceston; 7 km (4.3 mi) W of Mole Creek; 37 km (23 mi) W of Westbury
- Established: 1866

Government
  - State electorate: Lyons
  - Federal division: Lyons

Population
  - Total: 203 (2016 census)
- Postcode: 7304
- Mean max temp: 16.1 °C (61.0 °F)
- Mean min temp: 4.4 °C (39.9 °F)
- Annual rainfall: 1,125.1 mm (44.30 in)
Localities around Chudleigh
Lower Beulah	Weegena	Needles
Mole Creek	Chudleigh	Needles
Mole Creek	Caveside	Dairy Plains

Chudleigh is a rural locality in the local government area of Meander Valley in the Launceston region of Tasmania. The locality is about 37 kilometres (23 mi) west of the town of Westbury. The 2016 census recorded a population of 203 for the state suburb of Chudleigh.

It is a small rural village 64 kilometres (40 mi) west of Launceston in northern Tasmania, Australia. The town is in the Chudleigh Valley, between the Gog range and the Great Western Tiers. The area is primarily used for farming, though timber and lime production have been significant industries. The fertile flats of the valley are of alluvial origin, from the Permian period. The Chudleigh show, run by the Agricultural and Horticultural society, is an agricultural show held each February. Since 1889 the show has been held 125 times, and it is one of the state's oldest such events.

The area had been the lands of the Pallittorre Aboriginal Tasmanians for thousands of years. European settlement and disease drove them from the lands and decimated their population. Chudleigh was first settled by Europeans in the 1830s for agriculture and lime production. The town was laid out, probably prior to 1835, to have up to 5000 residents though the population never became large. An early resident, John Badcock Gardiner, named Chudleigh, probably after Chudleigh in Devon, England. During the 19th century a town hall, four churches, a school, an inn, post office, police station and telegraph office were built. Over time the churches, school, inn and post office have closed. A rail line from Deloraine to Mole Creek served the town from 1890 till its closure in 1985.

The town has a privately run wildlife park, a shop selling and making honey products, and a few other stores. As part of a beautification drive in 2001, the main street was planted with roses, and the town is now promoted as a "village of roses".

== Geography ==
Lobster Rivulet, a tributary of the Mersey River, flows through the locality from west to east, where it forms part of the north-eastern boundary.

Chudleigh lies 64 kilometres (40 mi) west of Launceston and 7 kilometres (4.3 mi) east of Mole Creek in northern Tasmania, Australia. The town is in the fertile Chudleigh Valley that is bounded by the Gog and Magog ranges, to the north, and the Great Western Tiers, to the south-west. The town itself is just south of the Lobster rivulet, a tributary of the Mersey river which also runs near the town to the north. The land around the town is mostly suited to grazing, intensive grazing in some areas, though some is marginal cropping land that requires careful crop rotation interspersed with seasons where the land is left fallow. The hills of the area have prominent basalt, limestone and dolerite depending on location. The fertile flats are of alluvial origin with Permian period sediments that have formed mudstone and sandstone. Some areas are notably frosty in winter and experience occasional snowfall.

== History ==
Aboriginal Tasmanians have lived on the island of Tasmania for thousands of years. The earliest archaeological evidence for Aboriginal habitation of Tasmania is from the valley of the Forth River, 35,000 years before the present. Prior to European settlement, Chudleigh was part of the lands of the Pallittorre Aboriginal tribe. Their range included Deloraine, east of Chudleigh, and the Gog mountain range to the north-west where they mined ochre in the Toolumbunner ochre pits. The Pallittorre people lived in the area and used to have a camping ground, where the Church of England cemetery was established later. Land clearing, road construction, disease and conflicts with settlers drove them from their lands and decimated the population. Their population in the area has been estimated to drop from 200 to 60 during 1827–30. At the time of settlement the Chudleigh area was covered with bogs and wild bush.

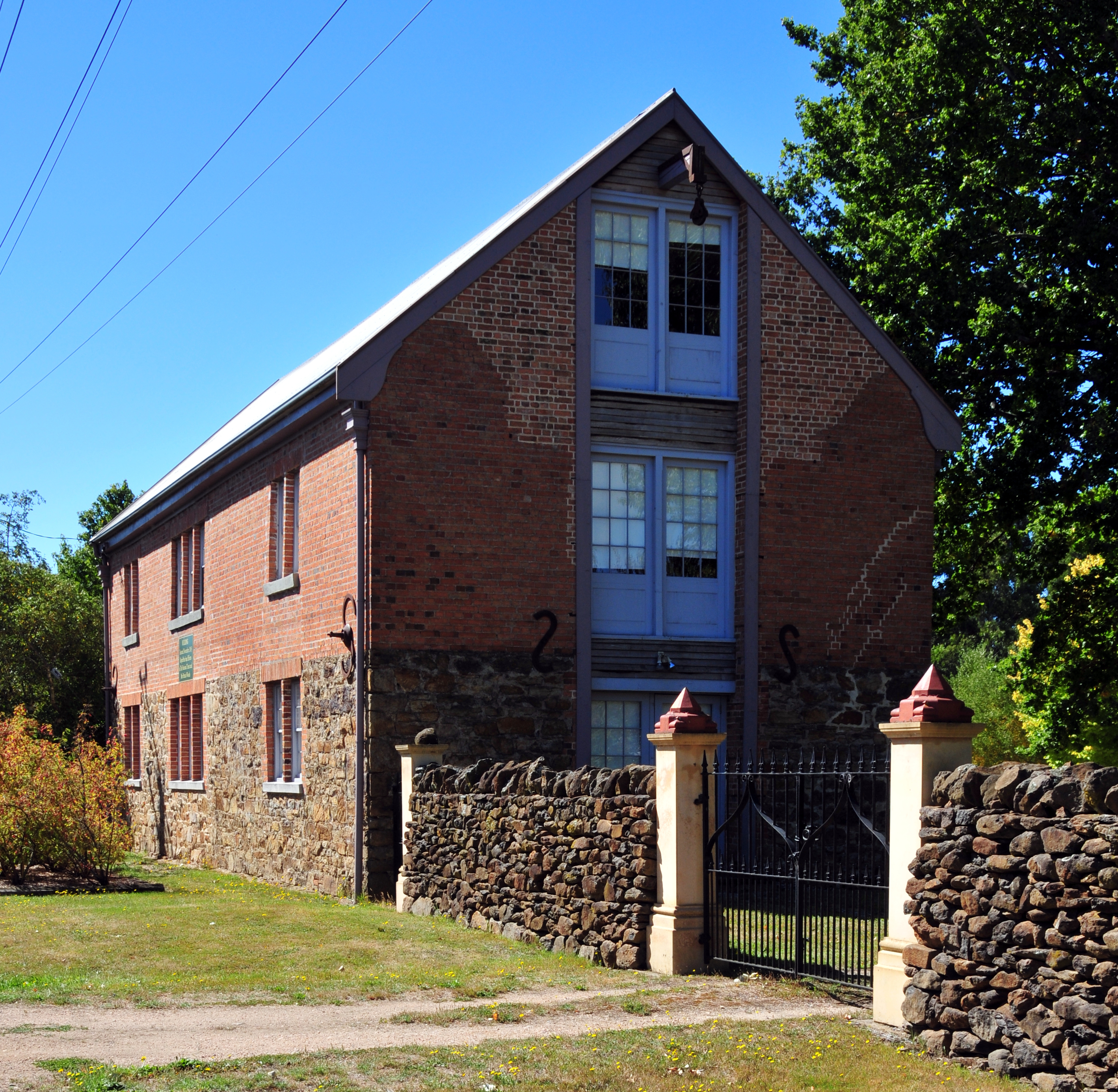
The restored former Van Diemen's Land company's grain store, built 1827–8

During the early 1820s the Van Diemen's Land Company created a track or stock route from Deloraine to Emu Bay (now Burnie) that ran via Chudleigh and Mole Creek. The route enabled them to move grazing livestock from the higher rainfall areas in the west of Tasmania, to the population centres further east. The company built facilities, including a store, in Chudleigh. Europeans settled the area west of Deloraine from the early 1800s, and cattle were being grazed—illegally—in the Chudleigh area from as early as 1823. John Badcock Gardiner, who probably named Chudleigh after the village with the same name in Devon, England, was granted 850 acres (340 ha) in the area after arriving in Tasmania in 1829 with his family. The town's area was first granted to Lieutenant Travers Hartley Vaughan in 1830. Vaughan sold the land in 1837 to Henry Reed, merchant, who was later briefly a member of the Tasmanian Legislative Council.

An early industry in the area was limestone mining and lime production. By 1831 a lime burning industry had been established. The lime was sent to Launceston for use in construction. The town of Chudleigh was surveyed and marked into town blocks, many of them 10 acres (4.0 ha). The date of this survey is not recorded but it was likely done by John Batman, founder of Melbourne, prior to 1835. The town was laid out to hold a population of 5,000, as it was intended to be a railway junction on a line from Launceston to North West Tasmania. Later road and transport developments caused the idea of such a large settlement at Chudleigh to be abandoned. Dan Picket, an ex-convict who has been granted a ticket of leave, built the first hotel, the two-storey Chudleigh Inn, around 1850. The building was later reduced to a single storey. This hotel or inn was noted as being used by 1851. A police watch house was completed c.1860. By 1862 an extensive system of caves had been discovered in the area, attracting visitors.

In the 1860s a 30-by-11-foot (9.1 by 3.4 m) single-room school building was constructed. The school opened 1 July 1864 with 14 pupils and a single teacher, though it apparently closed sometime after and reopened 28 January 1883 with a larger class of 34 pupils. (Note: The Mercury in 1883 notes school attendance as more normally 20) In 1884 a new building, and teacher's residence, was completed at a cost of 1531 pounds. The new school was on the road to Mole Creek near the bridge over Lobster Rivulet, and had around 26–27 students. The school suffered regular flooding of the building, access roads and paths. Due to this flooding it was moved, in the 1930s, to next to the Methodist chapel in Sorrell street. The school was extended in 1936 and remained in operation until closed, by the Tasmanian education department due to low student numbers, on 30 September 1965. From then students had to travel to the school at Mole Creek. The township of Chudleigh was formally declared in 1866. It continued to expand and by 1883 also had a post and telegraph office, two stores, two churches, and over a dozen houses. An agricultural and horticultural show was first held in 1889. The Chudleigh Agricultural and Horticultural Society has run the show annually since, except for breaks from 1914 to 1928 and 1939–45 due to the two World Wars. The show has been run on various grounds, but the present one has been used since it was purchased in 1932.

Chudleigh's town hall was completed in 1895, and opened during a public event on 11 April that year. It was funded by public subscription and built local builder Davis Brothers on donated land. It was built as a 46 by 26 feet (14.0 by 7.9 m) weather board building set on stone foundations, with a corrugated iron roof. There was a near tragedy in the hall in late 1922 when a generator caught fire while the hall was being used by 300 people. The inwards opening doors and lack of a fire door were cited as significant problems. Chudleigh had a post office from 1865. Around 1899 it was moved to a new building though it has since been closed and the building sold as a private home. Chudleigh had a registered maternity hospital in the early 20th century. For some time the town had an Australian rules football club. It closed in the 1930s, reformed in 1939, then finally closed in the 1980s. Telegraph communication followed construction of the railway line in the late 19th century. The first telephones were installed in Chudleigh homes in the 1930s, and mains electricity in the 1940s.

Chudleigh was gazetted as a locality in 1965.

=== Religion ===
Chudleigh has had churches for four different Christian denominations, though none remain. (Note: The last church in Chudleigh closed in 1984.)

An Anglican cemetery was opened in 1864. (Note: The Tasmanian Family History Society records the cemetery as in use from 1864 to 1960.). Construction of an Anglican (then the Church of England) church began in 1866 and the building was completed in 1868. This church, the Church of the Good Shepard, was in the parish of Deloraine. It was replaced with a new building, built by local carpenter Hugh Miles, in 1880. The new building was consecrated in 1895. It held services until 1976, was later sold, and is now a private residence. A Presbyterian cemetery was established in 1860. By 1877 a Presbyterian church had been built in what is now Burnett street, though it was later destroyed by fire. A small Salvation Army citadel, comprising a number of buildings, was established in Jones street in 1878. It was closed in 1938 and one of the buildings transported to Invermay, Tasmania where it was used as a Salvation Army band room. A Wesleyan chapel was built prior to 1877, around 4 to 5 miles (6.4 to 8.0 km) from Chudleigh, next to Lobster Rivulet. Methodist services began in the town in 1874, but ceased in 1876 when the pulpit was taken over by a Presbyterian minister. Land for a church was purchased in the town in April 1885. The building, and adjacent stables, were completed soon after and the opening service held 19 July 1885. To allow for an extension the building was later moved, and the stables removed. In 1977 the church became, along with most Methodist churches in Australia, part of the Uniting Church in Australia. It was closed in 1984 due to a lack of parishioners, and sold to become a private home.

=== Railway ===
A rail line was built from Mole Creek to Deloraine, through Chudleigh. It ran 20.4 kilometres (12.7 mi) from a junction on the western line and opened on 5 April 1890. The rail line was used for mail, freight and passengers; occasional passenger services went as far as Devonport. Passenger services mostly ceased when they were replaced with a bus service in 1960. The line continued to be used for transporting logs for some time after this. Throughout its existence, the line was primarily used to carry timber to the paper mill at Burnie and, in later days, woodchips to Bell Bay. Passenger services had been mostly self-propelled railcars after the 1920s. The line was closed in 1985, and the tracks lifted in 1992.

== Road infrastructure ==
The B12 route (Mole Creek Road) enters from the east and runs through to the south-west, where it exits. Route C169 (Caveside Road) starts at an intersection with B12 and runs south-west until it exits.

== Present ==
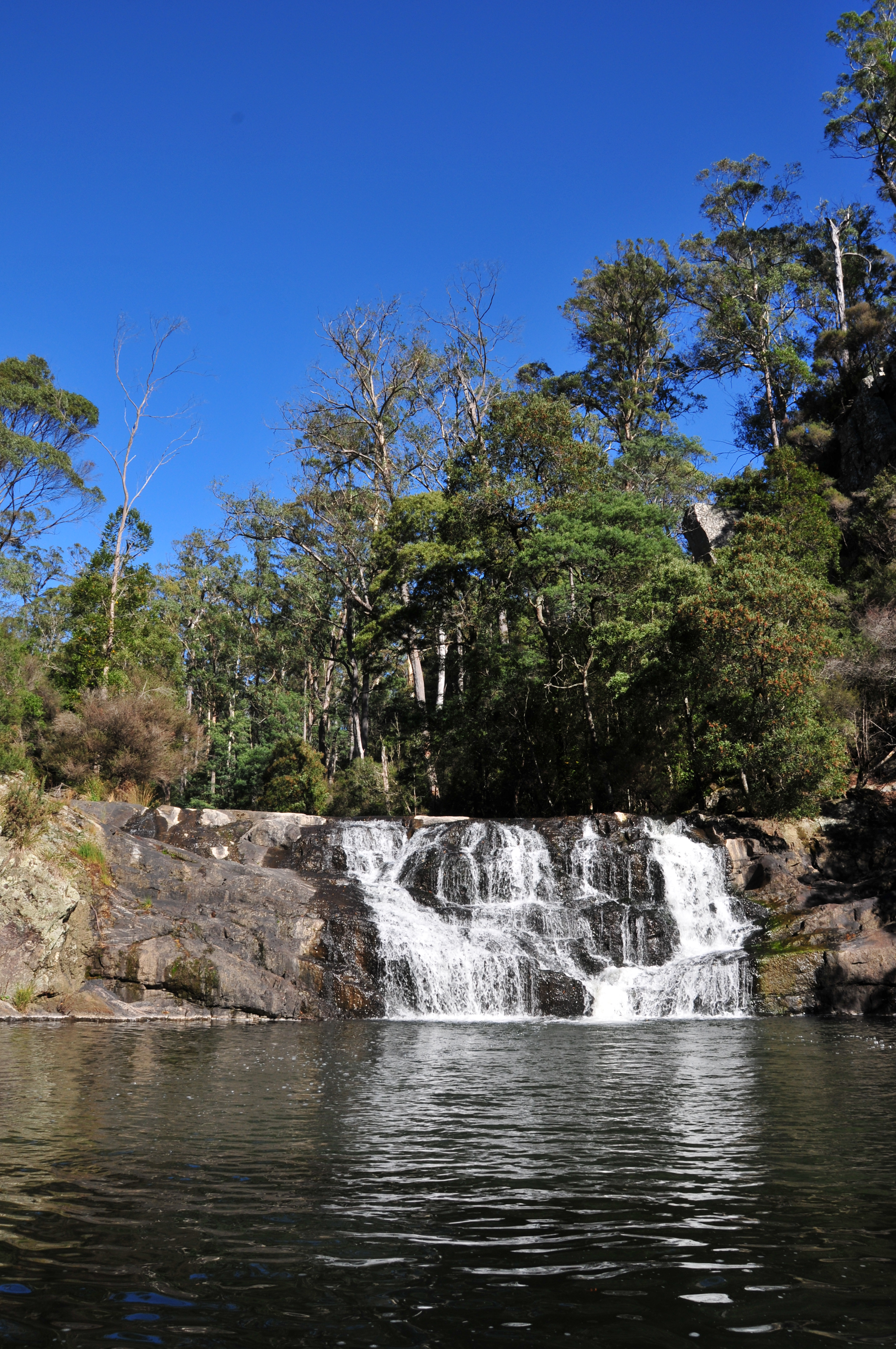
Waterfall on Lobster Rivulet

Chudleigh serves as a service centre for the surrounding area, whose main industries involve farming and timber. The town has few services. There is a shop producing and selling honey related products, a service station, general store, There are a large number of roses planted in the main street as part of a beautification drive, begun in 2001, to make the town a "village of roses".

There are some historic buildings, with connection to the town's early history. Bentley house's landscape is on the Tasmanian Heritage Register and the house itself is registered by the Tasmanian Heritage Council. Cattle were farmed on the land from at least 1827 and the house was finished in 1879, at which time the property was owned by Donald Norman Cameron, later member of the Tasmanian House of Assembly. At the south-east corner of the town, on the main road, is a restored building that was made for the Van Diemen's Land company in 1827–8 as a grain store. A sign commemorates acrimony around its restoration or remodelling, stating "Building restored November 2003. Despite the best efforts of The National Trust and Mrs Patrica Woods.". Patrica Woods was as the time president of the National Trust of Australia (Tasmania). The main street has a surveyor's cottage that was built around 1840

The Chudleigh show, run by the Agricultural and Horticultural society, is held each February. It is one of the state's oldest agricultural shows; in 2015 the 126th show was held. Melita honey farm runs a shop on the main street that sells a wide variety of honey related products. Mole Creek Karst National Park is nearby. Caves in the park thread through the limestone that underlies the area around Chudleigh. Nearby the town is the 130-hectare (320-acre) Lobster Rivulet Forest Reserve, which contains a series of scenic waterfalls. Trowunna Wildlife Park is a 65-acre (26 ha) private sanctuary a short distance on the main road towards Mole Creek. The park contains native Australian animals both in enclosures and free-ranging. It works as part of the effort to preserve Tasmanian devils by keeping a population that are free of facial tumour disease, and runs as a training centre for animal handling and animal keeping.

Chudleigh is in the Meander Valley Council local government area, the Division of Lyons—for the state house of assembly and the federal house of representatives— and the state legislative council electoral division of Western Tiers.

=== Demographics ===
The town's population, including the surrounding district, was reported in 1877 as approximately 1000. (Note: Baillière's Tasmanian gazetteer and road quide does not state how large the Chudleigh district is in reference to the population of 1000.). Chudleigh had a population of 162 in 1901 and 200 in 2000. There were around 150 people living in 40 houses just within the town's boundaries in 2002. As of the 2011 census 335 people lived in the town and surrounding 92.4-square-kilometre (35.7 sq mi) area.

== Climate ==
Tasmania has an oceanic temperate climate characterised by cool summer and mild winters, with a small maximum temperature variation during the year. Chudleigh lies in the rain shadow of the Great Western Tiers; rainfall in parts of the tiers exceeds 2,000 millimetres (79 in). Since the 1950s average temperatures in the surrounding Meander Valley have steadily risen and since the 1970s average rainfall has declined.

Climate data for Deloraine (Station 091000 temperature), Mole Creek (Station 091065 rainfall)
Month	Jan	Feb	Mar	Apr	May	Jun	Jul	Aug	Sep	Oct	Nov	Dec	Year
Mean daily maximum °C (°F)	21.3 (70.3)	22.5 (72.5)	19.6 (67.3)	16.5 (61.7)	13.2 (55.8)	10.9 (51.6)	10.4 (50.7)	11.4 (52.5)	13.3 (55.9)	15.5 (59.9)	17.7 (63.9)	20.1 (68.2)	16.1 (61.0)
Mean daily minimum °C (°F)	7.7 (45.9)	8.7 (47.7)	6.3 (43.3)	4.5 (40.1)	2.7 (36.9)	1.0 (33.8)	0.9 (33.6)	1.2 (34.2)	3.1 (37.6)	4.4 (39.9)	5.4 (41.7)	7.2 (45.0)	4.4 (39.9)
Average rainfall mm (inches)	52.9 (2.08)	59.7 (2.35)	60.6 (2.39)	83.6 (3.29)	109.5 (4.31)	113.9 (4.48)	147.6 (5.81)	145.6 (5.73)	113.1 (4.45)	93.3 (3.67)	72.1 (2.84)	68 (2.7)	1,125.1 (44.30)
Source 1: Bureau of Meteorology, Deloraine (Athol).
Source 2: Bureau of Meteorology, Mole Creek.

== Bibliography ==
- Australian Garden History Society (July 2006). Blue Gum, Newsletter # 89 (PDF). Australian Garden History Society, Tasmanian Branch. Archived from the original on 18 May 2015.
- Evans, Kathryn; Terry, Ian (October 2004). To the Westward, Meander Valley Heritage Study, Stage 1: Thematic History. Meander Valley Municipal Council.
- Henslowe, Dorothea (1978). Our heritage of Anglican churches in Tasmania. Moonah, Tasmania: Mercury-Walch. ISBN 090962514X.
- Jupp, James (2001). The Australian People: An Encyclopedia of the Nation, Its People and Their Origins. Cambridge University Press. ISBN 9780521807890.
- Reunion Committee for the Reunion of Caveside and Chudleigh Schools and District (1994). As the lobster flows : Caveside-Chudleigh, an historical record. Devonport. ISBN 064618010X.
- Stansall, Max (1975). Tasmanian Methodism. Launceston: Methodist Church of Australasia. ISBN 0909834091.
- Stephens, Geoffrey (1991). The Anglican Church in Tasmania. A diocesan history to mark the sesquicentenary. Hobart: Trustees of the Diocese. ISBN 064606813X.
- Tasmanian Family History Society Inc. Devonport Branch (2002). A transcription of the Chudleigh & Mole Creek cemeteries, Tasmania. Devonport. ISBN 1876445890.
- Topoclimate Services (2002). Meander Valley Council : land capability survey & mapping consultancy report & maps. Meander Valley Council.
- Whitworth, Robert (compiler) (1877). Baillière's Tasmanian gazetteer and road quide : containing the most recent and accurate information as to every place in the colony. Hobart: F.F. Bailliere.
