= Meander Valley Council =

Local government body in Tasmania, Australia

- Local government area
- Interactive map of Meander Valley Council
- Coordinates: 41.6267°S 146.4849°E
- Country: Australia
- State: Tasmania
- Region: Great Western Tiers
- Established: 2 April 1993
- Council seat: Westbury

Government
  - Mayor: Wayne Johnston
  - State electorate: Lyons
  - Federal division: Lyons

Area
  - Total: 3,331 km^{2} (1,286 sq mi)

Population
  - Total: 19,713 (2018)
  - Density: 5.9180/km^{2} (15.3277/sq mi)
- Website: Meander Valley Council
LGAs around Meander Valley Council
| Kentish | Latrobe | West Tamar |
| West Coast | Meander Valley Council | Launceston |
| Central Highlands | Central Highlands | Northern Midlands |

Meander Valley Council is a local government body in northern Tasmania. It covers the western outskirts of Launceston, and further westward along the Meander River. Meander Valley Council is classified as a rural local government area and has a population of 19,713. Major towns and localities of the region include Elizabeth Town, Mole Creek, Westbury and the principal town of Deloraine.

== History and attributes ==
On 2 April 1993, the municipalities of Deloraine and Westbury were amalgamated to form the Meander Valley Council. Meander Valley is classified as rural, agricultural and very large under the Australian Classification of Local Governments.

=== Localities ===
The municipality includes the localities of Bracknell, Carrick, Chudleigh, Hagley, Meander, Whitemore, Bracknell, Mole Creek, Westbury, Deloraine, Elizabeth Town, Caveside, Exton and Travellers Rest. It also includes the outer western suburbs of Launceston including Blackstone Heights and Prospect Vale, and the satellite town of Hadspen.

A majority of the Great Western Tiers mountain range is within the Meander Valley municipal area.

== Current composition ==
| Name | Position | Party |
|---|---|---|
| Wayne Johnston | Mayor | Independent |
| Stephanie Cameron | Deputy Mayor | Liberal |
| Christine Cronshaw | Councillor | Independent |
| Ben Dudman | Councillor | Labor |
| Anne Marie Loader | Councillor | Independent |
| Kevin House | Councillor | Independent |
| John Temple | Councillor | Independent |
| Rodney Synfield | Councillor | Independent |
| Daniel Smedley | Councillor | Independent |

== Localities and suburbs ==
List of localities and suburbs.

| Localities | Census population 2011 | Reason |
|---|---|---|
| Kimberley | 436 | Includes Weegena, Moltema, Dunorlan |
| Weegena | | Incl. in Kimberley |
| Moltema | | Incl. in Kimberley |
| Dunorlan | | Incl. in Kimberley |
| Elizabeth Town | 420 | Includes Parkham |
| Parkham | | Incl. in Elizabeth Town |
| Reedy Marsh | 309 | |
| Birralee | 362 | Includes Rosevale, Selbourne |
| Rosevale | | Incl. in Birralee |
| Selbourne | | Incl. in Birralee |
| Westwood | | Incl. in Carrick |
| Blackstone Heights | 1,294 | |
| Travellers Rest | 244 | |
| Prospect Vale | 5,021 | |
| Hadspen | 2,063 | |
| Quamby Bend | | Incl. in Westbury |
| Quamby Brook | | Incl. in Golden Valley |
| Westbury | 2,104 | Includes Quamby Bend, Osmaston |
| Osmaston | | Incl. in Westbury |
| Carrick | 870 | Includes Westwood, Oaks |
| Hagley | 330 | |
| Whitemore | 236 | Includes Cluan |
| Oaks | | Incl. in Carrick |
| Cluan | | Incl. in Whitemore |
| Montana | | Incl. in Meander |
| Bracknell | 375 | |
| Liffey | 259 | |
| Golden Valley | 290 | Includes Quamby Brook |
| Jackeys Marsh | | Incl. in Meander |
| Meander | 415 | Includes Jackeys Marsh |
| Western Creek | | Incl. in Caveside |
| Lake McKenzie | | Incl. in Mersey Forest |
| Rowallan | | Incl. in Mersey Forest |
| Mersey Forest | 0 | Includes Lake McKenzie, Rowallan, Parangana, Lemonthyme, Cradle Mountain |
| Parangana | | Incl. in Mersey Forest |
| Lemonthyme | | Incl. in Mersey Forest |
| Cradle Mountain | | Incl. in Mersey Forest, Staverton (Kentish) |
| Liena | | Incl. in Mole Creek |
| Mayberry | | Incl. in Mole Creek |
| Mole Creek | 609 | Includes Mayberry, Liena |
| Caveside | 318 | Includes Western Creek, Dairy Plains |
| Chudleigh | | Includes Needles, Red Hills, Lemana Junction |
| Needles | | Incl. in Chudleigh |
| Red Hills | | Incl. in Chudleigh |
| Lemana Junction | | Incl. in Chudleigh |
| Deloraine | 2,741 | |
| Exton | | Incl. in Reedy Marsh |
| Total | 19,031 | |
| | (143) | Variance |
| Local government total | 18,888 | Gazetted Meander Valley local government area |

=== Missing from the above list ===
- Central Plateau
- Dairy Plains
- Frankford
- Lake St Clair
- Middlesex
- Mount Roland
- Riverside
- Sassafras
- Walls of Jerusalem
- Weetah

== See also ==
- List of local government areas of Tasmania
