= Western Creek, Tasmania =

Western Creek Tasmania
- Coordinates: 41°38′33″S 146°30′29″E
- Population: 116 (2016 census)
- Postcode(s): 7304
- Location: 69 km (43 mi) SE of Devonport
- LGA(s): Meander Valley
- Region: North West
- State electorate(s): Lyons
- Federal division(s): Lyons
Localities around Western Creek:
Caveside	Dairy Plains	Montana
Caveside	Western Creek	Meander
Central Plateau	Central Plateau Conservation Area	Meander

Western Creek is a locality and small rural community in the local government area of Meander Valley in the North West region of Tasmania. It is located about 69 kilometres (43 mi) south-east of the town of Devonport. The 2016 census determined a population of 116 for the state suburb of Western Creek.

== History ==
The locality was originally known as Dalebrook. It was the site of one of the first water-powered sawmills in Tasmania.

== Geography ==
Western Creek (the watercourse) and Dale Brook both run from south to north through the locality.

== Road infrastructure ==
The C168 route (Dairy Plains Road) enters the locality from the north and exits to the north-west as Western Creek Road. The C166 route (Cheshunt Road) starts at an intersection with route C168 and exits to the north-east.
