= Meander, Tasmania =

Meander
- Town
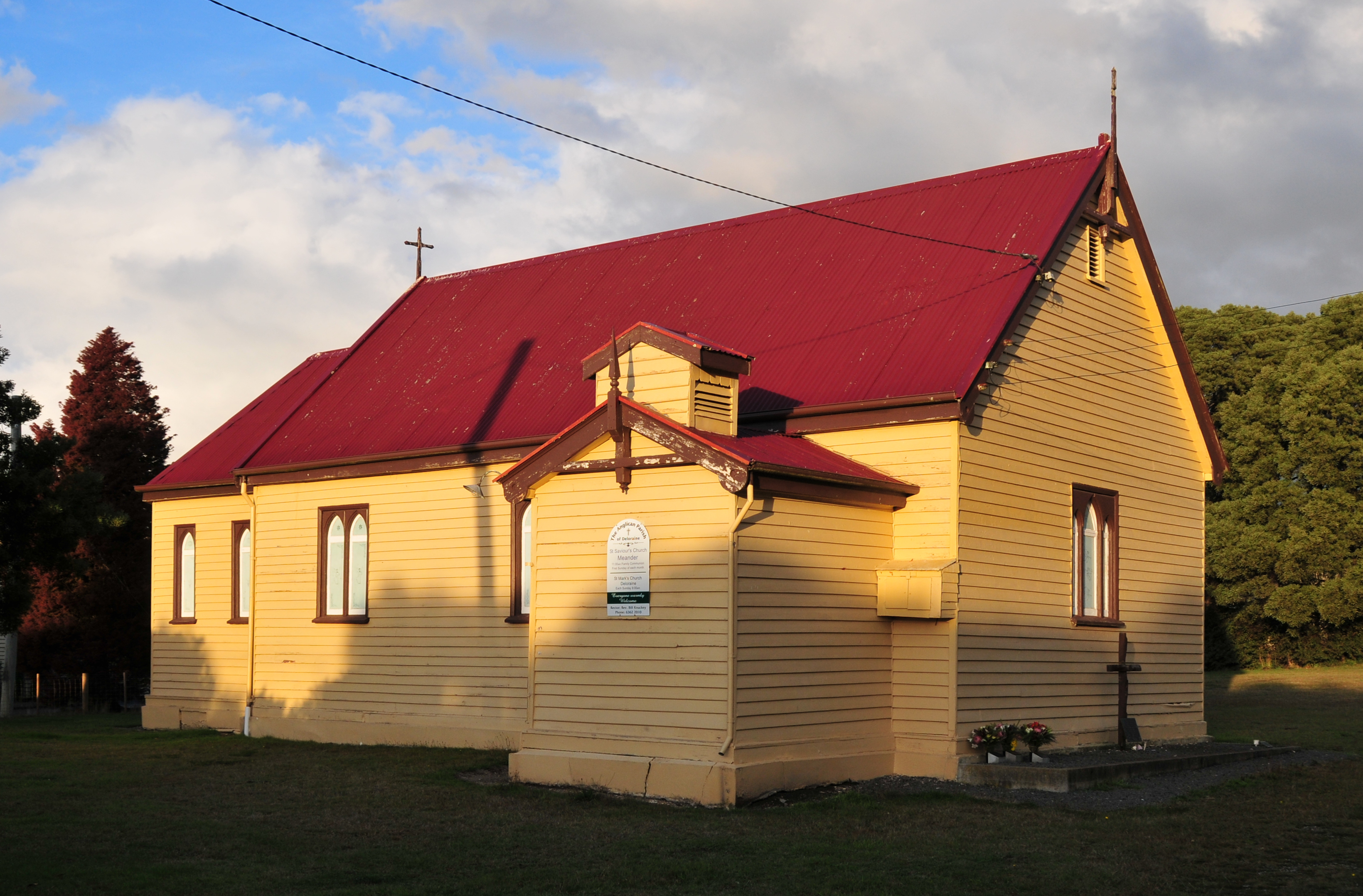
- St Saviour's Anglican Church

- Coordinates: 41°39′S 146°37′E
- Country: Australia
- State: Tasmania
- Region: Launceston
- LGA: Meander Valley Council
- Location: 212 km (132 mi) N of Hobart; 74 km (46 mi) SW of Launceston; 24 km (15 mi) S of Deloraine; 34 km (21 mi) SW of Westbury
- Established: 1907

Government
  - State electorate: Lyons
  - Federal division: Lyons
- Elevation: 291 m (955 ft)

Population
  - Total: 328 (2016 census)
- Postcode: 7304
- Mean max temp: 16.1 °C (61.0 °F)
- Mean min temp: 4.4 °C (39.9 °F)
- Annual rainfall: 1,062 mm (41.8 in)
Localities around Meander
Montana	Deloraine	Golden Valley
Montana, Western Creek	Meander	Jackeys Marsh, Golden Valley
Central Plateau	Central Plateau Conservation Area	Central Plateau

Meander is a rural locality and town in the local government area of Meander Valley in the Launceston region of Tasmania. The locality is about 34 kilometres (21 mi) south-west of the town of Westbury. The 2016 census recorded a population of 328 for the state suburb of Meander.

In 2011 it had a population of 415, forty percent of whom worked directly in agriculture, many in the dominant industries of grazing of sheep and cattle, and the dairy industry. The surrounding land has been modified by the original Indigenous inhabitants, who turned forest into grassland, and the later settlers, who have created extensive channels for irrigation and drainage. The town is 24 kilometres (15 mi) south of the town of Deloraine, Tasmania and is bisected by the Meander River. It sits between Quamby Bluff and Mother Cummings Peak of the Great Western Tiers mountain range.

Meander's surrounds had been inhabited for thousands of years by the Pallittorre, part of the Northern Tribe of Aboriginal Tasmanians. European immigrants began moving into the area in the 1820s and they came into often violent conflict with the Pallittorre. The Pallittorre were removed from the land by a combination of deliberate government policy, disease and the conflicts with the new settlers. Land grants were first made to the European settlers from 1828, firstly of large areas but later for areas of under 100 acres (40 ha). The town of Meander was first gazetted in 1901, though never built as intended, then finally gazetted in another location in 1907. Industry in the town has included sawmilling, dairy, a cheese factory, and an abattoir.

Meander Primary school, built c.1910–11, contains buildings relocated from closed schools formerly in surrounding areas. It, and the adjacent St Saviour's Anglican church, have been classed a "historic precinct" by the National Trust. The town has had a Methodist church—later part of the Uniting Church in Australia—and a Baptist church, but only the Anglican church remains in use. The town has a single store, with a post office agency, and a community hall. Timberworld, a timber and prefabricated home supplier, was formerly run by Kim Booth, leader of the Tasmanian Greens political party. The town has had cricket, basketball, badminton, sheep dog and Australian rules football clubs. Two of the football club's players went on to play in the Victorian Football League, a cricket chairman was awarded an Order of Australia medal for his services to the area, and the town featured in the early life of noted Australian country music singer Jean Stafford.

== Traditional custodians ==
The original inhabitants of the Meander area were the Pallittorre, who were part of the Northern Tribe of Aboriginal Tasmanians. There are caves south of Meander, in the Great Western Tiers, with deposits showing Aboriginal habitation, though these have not been dated. The deposits were either left by the Pallittorre, or their neighbours the Luggermairrernerpairre who were part of the Big River tribe. The Pallittorre probably inhabited the area for thousands of years; aborigines are believed to have lived in Tasmania for more than 30,000 years. The Northern Tribe had three other bands, based near Emu Bay, Hampshire Hills and Port Sorell. The Pallittorre's numbers have been estimated from as low as 50–60 to as high as 600. They maintained cleared grassy plains by regular careful burning, and used this method also to control undergrowth in the forests. This land management technique enabled easier hunting and food gathering. European colonists noted, after the Pallittorre had been eliminated from the area, how the forests rapidly reclaimed the formerly cleared land. They ranged across the land on a seasonal basis, at least as far as Mole Creek, and lived in villages of bark huts at times. They mined ochre in the Gog Range, trading this with other aborigines, across Tasmania. The Pallitorre congregated in areas in the Meander area, such as Jackeys Marsh - the name 'jackey' being a colloquial term for Aboriginal people.

From c.1824 the movement of European colonists and their farming practices onto Pallittorre lands brought the two groups into often violent conflict. The conflict increased over time. In retaliation for acts by Europeans, killings of settlers by aborigines in 1827 appear to have been part of a coordinated effort to drive the settlers away. The conflict and violence was from both Europeans and aborigines, though more the former than latter. European disease, deliberate killings, forced exile to the islands of Bass Strait, and the driving of the natives from their land and food sources reduced their population. This reduction was such that during an 1834 visit George Augustus Robinson, Protector of Aborigines, could find only one woman in the area. There are only records of two colonists killed by the Pallittorre. The number of Pallittorre killed is not recorded; Shayne Breen—Lecturer in Aboriginal Studies at the University of Tasmania—has estimated more than one hundred. The removal of the Pallittorre from their land, a pattern echoed across Tasmania, was largely intentional. Deliberate policy, promulgated by Governor Arthur, was to remove the native population from the land and grant it to European settlers.

== European settlement ==
The Meander area was first settled by Europeans in 1822, prior to land grants being made. The first land grant in the Meander area was to Robert Garrett, Assistant Colonial Surgeon, in 1828, of 1,500 acres (610 ha) near Quamby Bluff. From the 1830s grants were made over much land in the valley, primarily for grazing. Most grants were large (thousands of acres). Government acts enabled and encouraged smaller landholdings, particularly the Waste Lands Act of 1858. This enabled crown land areas of less than 320 acres (130 ha) to be sold; by 1878 there were 16 holdings of less than 100 acres (40 ha).

The smaller grants led to a growing population. In 1900 a township near the present town was surveyed and 125 acres (51 ha) reserved for its construction. This first town was gazetted in 1901 but never developed, remaining only a plan. The town was first called Cheshunt Town after the nearby Cheshunt Estate, but the area had been known informally as Meander from c.1888. The present town was planned and laid out a short distance away, then gazetted in 1907. Meander was gazetted as a locality in 1968.

== Geography ==
The Meander River flows through from west to east via Lake Huntsman, forms part of the eastern boundary, flows through from north-east to north-west, and then forms part of the western boundary.

== Road infrastructure ==
Highland Lakes Road (Route A5) briefly touches the northern boundary. Route C167 (Meander Road / Main Road / Huntsman Road) enters from the north and runs through to Huntsman Lake in the south-east, where it ends, with the road continuing with no route number to Meander Falls. Route C166 (Cheshunt Road) starts at an intersection with C167 and runs west, including a small section on the boundary, until it exits.

== Current town ==
The area around the town is primarily used for agriculture, mostly grazing of sheep, cattle and the associated dairy industry. Opium poppies have been grown, for pharmaceutical production, since the 1970s. Early land modification is evident in an irrigation system, consisting of 65 square kilometres (25 sq mi) of land with artificial irrigation and drainage channels. These were made in the late 1840s, diverting water from the Meander River and returning excess further downstream, and are still used. Meander sits astride the Meander River, near the Great Western Tiers, between the mountains Quamby Bluff and Mother Cummings Peak.

St Saviour's Anglican church was built in 1898 and is an actively used church in the parish of Deloraine. Next to the church is the Meander Primary School. The school contains a number of buildings that have been relocated from surrounding settlements to Meander including: The old school building from Montana; Jacky's Marsh school building which is used as a library and kitchen; A building that was part of the school at Golden Valley. The school and St Saviour's Church were classified as a "historic precinct" by the National Trust in 1988. Cheshunt is a historic home, owned by the Bowman family, whose former estate covered much of the Meander area. The home is a two-story Victorian building that was designed and completed, in 1852, by noted architect William Archer. The southern wing of the house was completed in 1886.

Meander is in the Meander Valley Council local government area, the Division of Lyons—for the state house of assembly and the federal house of representatives— and the state legislative council electoral division of Western Tiers.

=== Demographics and people ===
The town of Meander, and the surrounding 138.6 square kilometres (53.5 sq mi) area, had a population 293 at the 2006 census. The statistical measurement area was enlarged to 229.6 square kilometres (88.6 sq mi) at the 2011 census and the population recorded as 415.

The 2011 census reported agriculture as a significant source of employment; almost 40 percent of those working are employed in the livestock, dairy farming, grain farming and sawmilling industries. As is the case for Tasmania as a whole, Meander's residents are primarily Australian born—84.6% compared to 83.6% for Tasmania and 69.8% for Australia—and have both parents born in Australia (75.5%, the same percentage as Tasmania). With few exceptions English is the only language spoken, and more than 80% of residents reported ancestry from Australia or Great Britain. The population has a similar median age to the rest of Tasmania—41 years compared to 40—but older than the 37 years for the rest of Australia. 47% of residents reported some religious affiliation, 65% of these Anglican and the remainder other Christian churches. All occupied homes are separate buildings, 81.3% of which are owned outright or mortgaged, higher than the 67% for all of Australia. Household income is lower than the state or county; $770 per week for Meander compared to $948 for Tasmania and $1234 for Australia.

One of the town's more famous residents was Jean Stafford. She is a successful country music singer who spent some of her childhood living in a Meander farm house, attending the Meander school, and was married at the Meander Methodist Church. She has won Golden Guitar awards, as Australia's best female country singer, and was given the Keys to the City of Nashville, Tennessee in 1991.

== Education ==
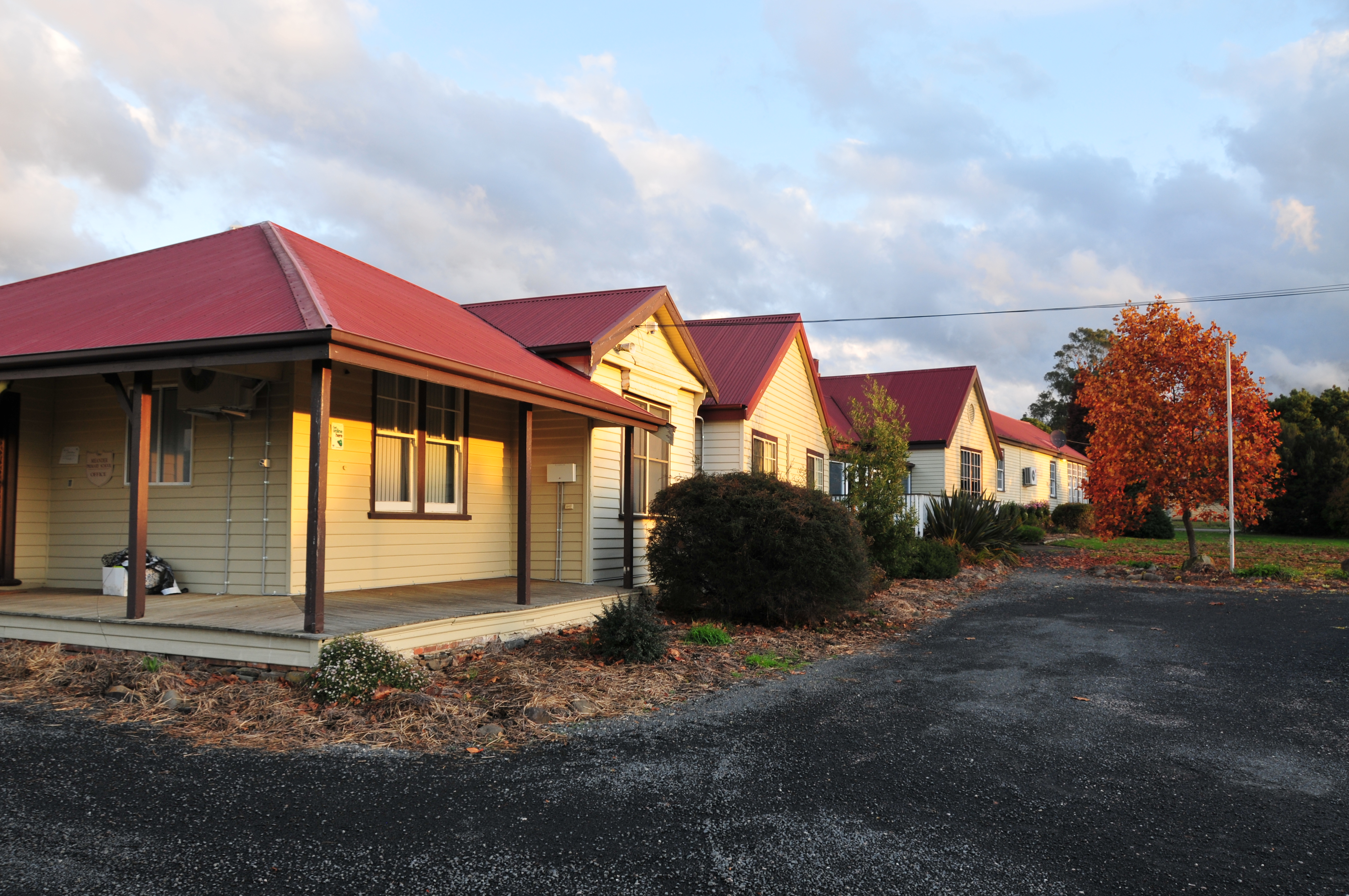
Buildings of Meander Primary School

Schooling started in Meander in 1891, when the Government rented a building from the Meander Church of England, a building now called the Sunday School. They agree to rent it for two years as a school was intended to be built. The first teacher at the "West Meander School", Miss Mary Johnson, taught at the school for 21 years from the 1891 opening till 1917, when she moved onto a teaching position in Deloraine. When opened the school, which taught only primary school age children, had 19 students. In 1901 the education department purchased 1 acre (4,000 m^{2}) next to the church, and a new school was built c.1910–11. Meander's student population grew to a maximum of 80–90 in 1926, though this may have been a temporary increase due to students from Montana while the school there, which was damaged by fire, was being rebuilt.

School ran at various times at localities near Meander including: Montana; Golden Valley; Western Creek; and Jacky's Marsh. A school opened on a property known as Cheshunt in 1907, as the Springdale School. In 1919 it was moved to Montana, and renamed Montana School in 1923. The building burned down December 1926. During rebuilding some students were educated at the Montana Baptist church, others at the school at Meander. The school closed in 1944, by which time there were only seven students. The Montana school building was moved to be part of the Meander School in 1947–48. A school was run at Golden Valley from 1870 to 1945, initially as a 1/2-day school. During most of its life it had around 30 students. After closing the school building was relocated to Meander School. Western Creek had a school from 1893 to 1938. After it closed some students attended Meander's school, but others moved to schools at Mole Creek and Deloraine. Unlike other schools in the area the building was not moved to Meander but instead to Mole Creek's school. Children from Jacky's Marsh travelled to Meander for schooling until 1900 when the Jacky's Marsh school opened. The school was closed 1910–22 and finally closed in 1937. The school building was moved to Meander c1940. From the 1940s school buses brought children from Jacky's Marsh, Montana, Huntsman, Western creek and other nearby areas.

From 1949 to 1968 Meander's school was a state school rather than a primary school. The curriculum included secondary schooling and the school taught students from Grade 1 to Grade 9. From 1968 the school became a primary only school known as "Meander Primary school". Secondary students were transported by bus to Deloraine's high school. This change was made as it was uneconomic to separately educate what was then a small number of secondary students; by the end of 1967 there were only 16 secondary students. In 1991, the school had 60 students, in three class groups, taught by five full-time staff. In 2009 it had 62 students, primary school students from grades one through six, and seven teaching staff. At the end of 2014 enrollments had declined and, with expected student numbers below twenty in 2015, the primary school began the process of closing. Students were expected to continue their education either at Deloraine or Mole Creek.

== Religion ==
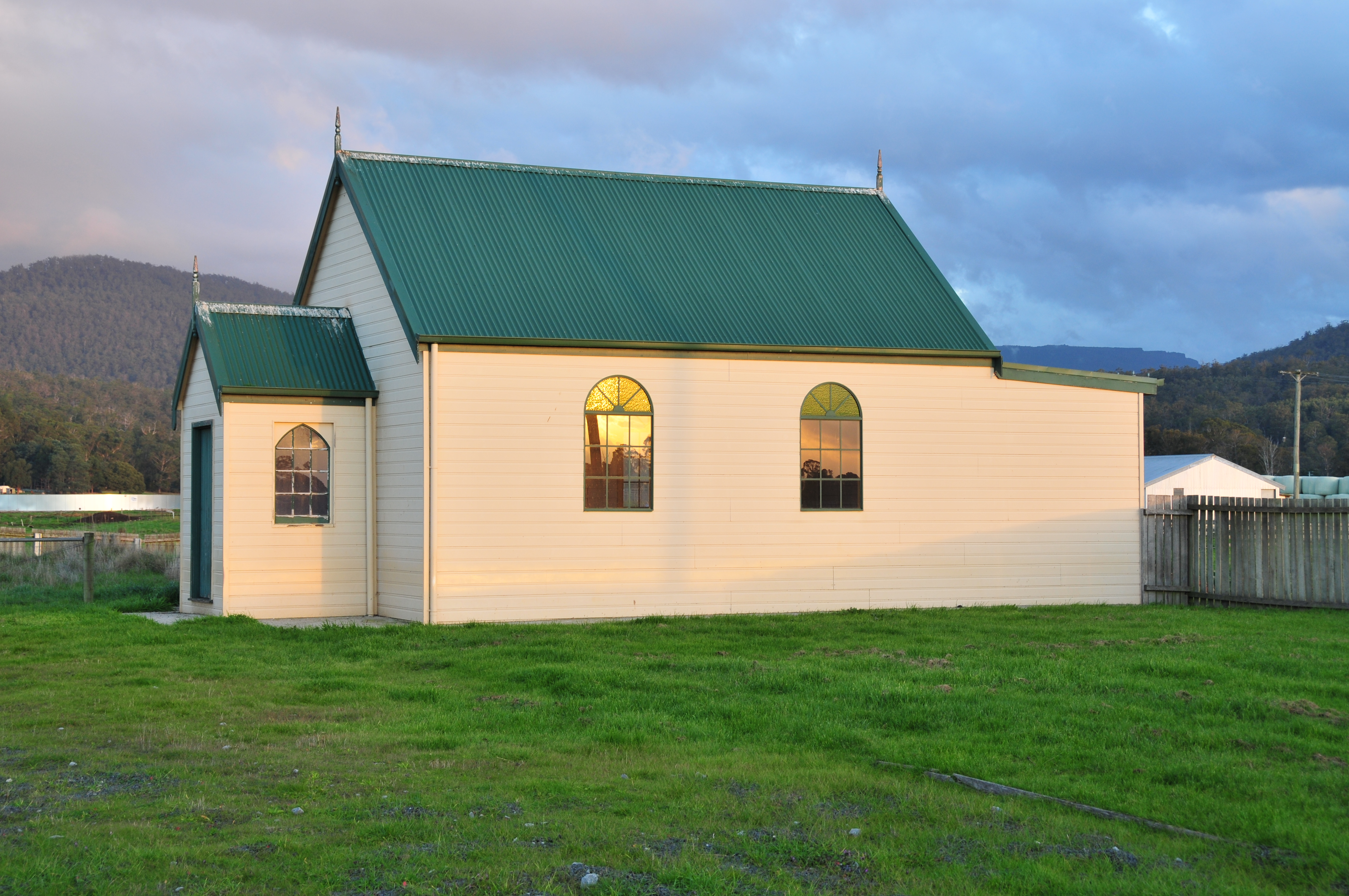
Former Baptist church building

The first church in Meander was a Methodist chapel, built on the corner of Main Road and East Meander Road on land donated by a local family. It opened in 1886; construction was most likely funded by local Methodists. Until subsequent churches were built it was used by all Christian denominations. Meander's Methodist church became part of the Uniting Church in Australia in 1976, along with many other Methodist churches. The church continued after this to be used by other denominations. It hosted its last service 20 May 1984 and the building was subsequently sold.

A Baptist church was built, also on the main road, and opened in 1923. It was a timber-framed weatherboard building, built on land donated by the first Baptist minister's son, the local butcher. The last service at the church was held 28 April 1985. Prior to this, as attendance declined, the congregations of the Baptist and Uniting Churches had often combined, and roles such as the organist were shared.

A Sunday School building, originally known as the Mission Church, was built in the late 19th century. The Anglican Church of England was holding services in this building from at least 1891. On 22 September 1897 the foundation stone of a new church, St Saviour's, was laid, next to the Sunday School building. St Saviour's opened 3 February 1898 when it was dedicated by Bishop Montagu Stone-Wigg. Sunday School continued in the old building from 1898 to c.1980. The nearby cemetery had its first burial in 1891. St Saviour's was consecrated in November 1902. The church, as of 2009, holds monthly services attended by 6–7 local parishioners.

== Services ==
The first store opened in Meander in 1892 on the East Meander Road, and was open until 1902. Different stores in Meander have sold a wide variety of goods over the life of the town; some have operated as petrol stations, butchers and grocers. At least six stores have been open at different times in the town. The only store open in the 21st century opened c.1951 and has run under various owners.

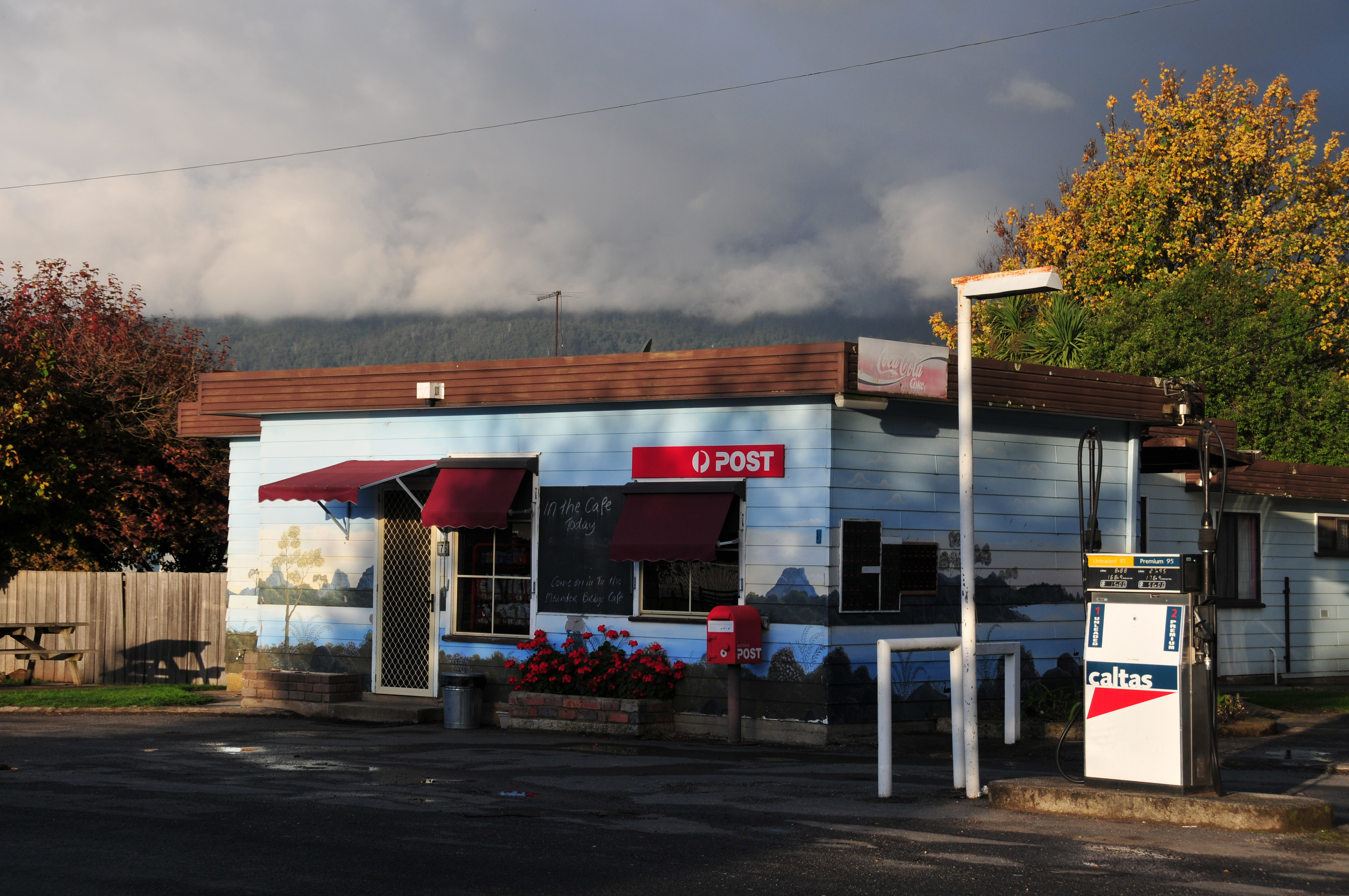
Meander's store and Post Office in 2014

There was a post office in Meander by 1888, probably started the previous year. Prior to this there was an unofficial post office, a mail depot run by locals. The post office continued in a separate building until then postmaster, Harold Taylor, retired in 1977. After this post function was a service provided by the local store. There was a manual telephone exchange in the post office building. This was replaced with an automatic exchange in June 1975.

The first community hall at Meander was built in 1914. It was built by local resident Fred Bowman, who maintained it until 1945 when responsibility was taken over by a local committee. Locals decided, in 1952, to build a new hall. Funding from the hall came from, competitions, dances and the growing of peas for sale. The hall opened 3 December 1954 and was physically joined to the original c.1957. The Road from Deloraine to Meander was sealed in 1964, an event of some note that was celebrated with a gymkhana and fair. Mains electricity reached Meander in 1952 when power, supplied by the Hydro-Electric Commission, was switched on in Meander's township area December 1952. Meander's street lights were first turned on 12 November 1971.

The Meander volunteer fire brigade was formed in 1972, though a station was not built until some years after. They received their first fire truck in 1973, which had to be kept at member's houses for the first few years. In 1991 the brigade had approximately 15 members. This brigade was formed in consequence of the Rural Fires Act 1950; an act aimed at combating bushfires.

== Industry ==
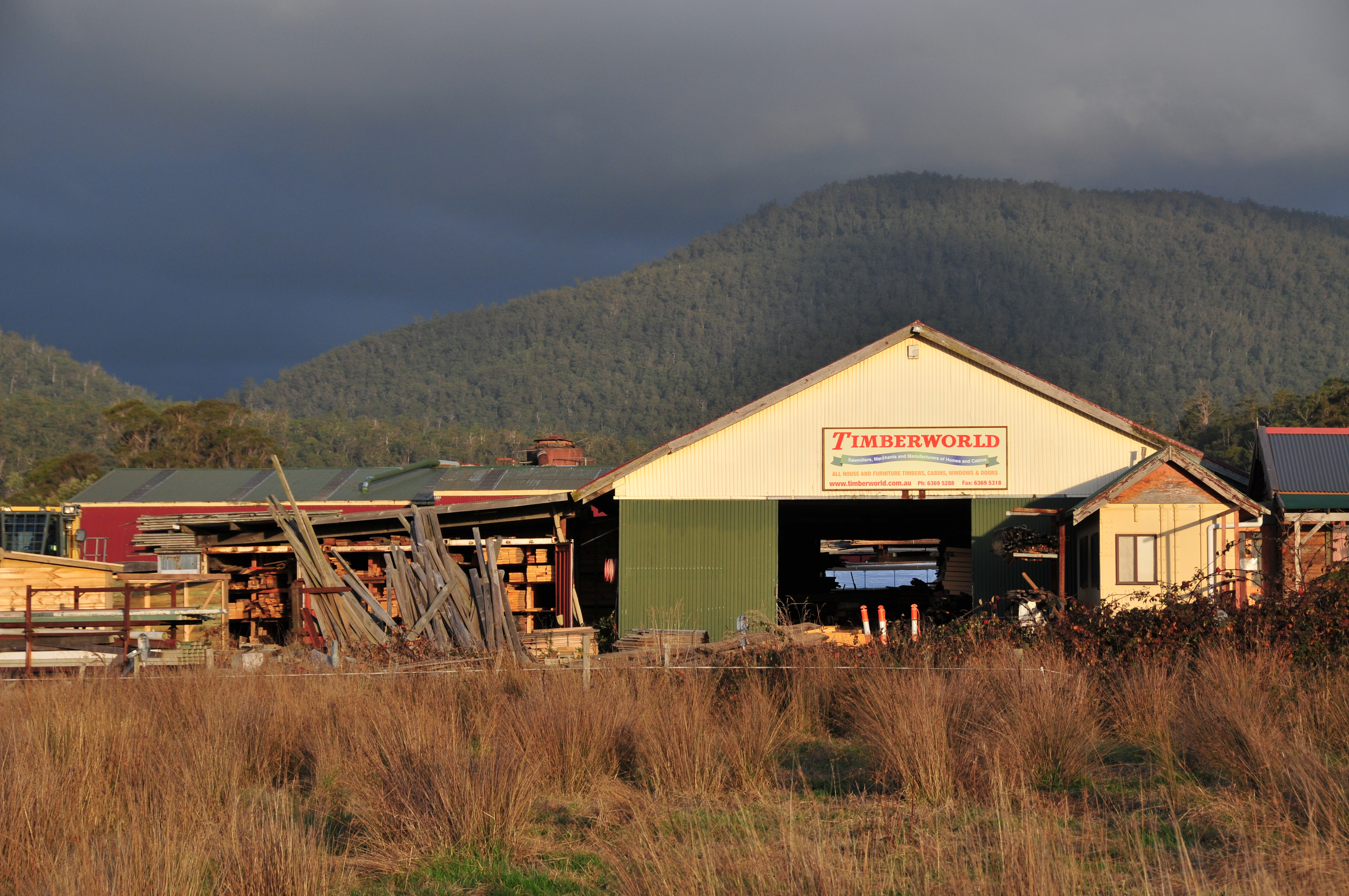
Timberworld in 2014

Due to the heavy forestation in the area, sawmilling was an important and early industry, starting in the 1830s. In the early 20th century, there were around 20 sawmills in Meander and the surrounding localities. Due to a move towards closer settlement—smaller land plots and resulting greater population density—demand for timber in Meander increased and new sawmills were built in Meander in the 1910s and 1920s. Some of these mills continued into the late 20th century. Sawmilling later declined, partly due to lack of timber. Timberworld is the only remaining sawmill, though this is not its only business. It opened in 1985 as a sawmill supplying local Australian blackwood, myrtle beach and Blackheart Sassafras, originally operating from the former Baptist Church building. From 1990 it was owned and run by Kerin Booth and Kim Booth and it relocated to the former site of the Cummings Bros sawmill. Kim Booth, leader of the Tasmanian Greens, later passed management of the company to his son, Bronte. At one time Timberworld employed 30 people. The company now focuses on supply of prefabricated homes.

On-farm factories in the Deloraine area made cheese, mostly cheddar, during the early 20th century. Cheese was made in the Meander area from at least 1908 when a factory opened on the Cheshunt estate. The last of the area's factories closed prior to World War II. Meander had a resident blacksmith from c.1876, though blacksmithing had been done on private properties before this. Blacksmithing as a separate industry continued into the early 20th century. Prompted by new legislation in the 1980s, that enforced hygiene standards in animal slaughtering, a slaughter-house was opened in Meander. It was registered in 1986. Before this butchering was a more informal or back-yard industry.

== Sports ==
Meander's Australian rules football club was formed in 1923, playing in the Chudleigh Association, and won the Association premiership in 1931. The club stopped playing during World War II. After the war they moved to the Central Association, and later the Deloraine Association. From 1966 to 1976 they were part of the Esk Association before returning to Deloraine. The club closed in 1982 due to a lack of both players and support from locals. Some footballers from Meander were noted for their later success in the game. Carl Watson played in the Meander club, before moving to the Latrobe Seniors. He played for Richmond 1925–31 and Essendon for his final Victorian Football League season in 1932. Ron McGowan was at Meander School in the 1950s. He played in various clubs in Tasmania before starting with Footscray where he played 92 games from 1965 to 1972. He later played with South Adelaide, and spent time as Footscray's chairman of the selection committee.

The Meander cricket club formed circa 1896. It closed from 1912 to 1921 and during 1927–1984 it was mostly involved in social games. The club was revived for competition in the 1980s; a new concrete pitch was built. In 1991 they played in the 'A' Grade of the Westmoreland Cricket Association. In 2012, Neil William Johnston, club chairman since 2009, was awarded the Medal of the Order of Australia in the general division for service to the community of Meander. He was also a founding member of the fire brigade, local Councillor and involved with the football, badminton and basketball clubs.

Meander badminton club began playing in 1951, joined the Deloraine Association in 1959, and by 1991 fielded four teams. A sheep dog club opened late 1970s. Meander has hosted the Tasmanian Championships four times and the Australian Championships once, in 1990, when the champion was Meander club member Henry Homan. This event was the "Supreme Australian Championship" of the Australian Sheepdog Workers' Association. Meander had a basketball club from 1960 to c.1977. The club was primarily a Christian basketball club associated with the Baptist church.

== Climate ==
Climate data for Meander (Station 091061 rainfall), Deloraine (Station 091000 temperature)
Month	Jan	Feb	Mar	Apr	May	Jun	Jul	Aug	Sep	Oct	Nov	Dec	Year
Mean daily maximum °C (°F)	21.3 (70.3)	22.5 (72.5)	19.6 (67.3)	16.5 (61.7)	13.2 (55.8)	10.9 (51.6)	10.4 (50.7)	11.4 (52.5)	13.3 (55.9)	15.5 (59.9)	17.7 (63.9)	20.1 (68.2)	16.1 (61.0)
Mean daily minimum °C (°F)	7.7 (45.9)	8.7 (47.7)	6.3 (43.3)	4.5 (40.1)	2.7 (36.9)	1.0 (33.8)	0.9 (33.6)	1.2 (34.2)	3.1 (37.6)	4.4 (39.9)	5.4 (41.7)	7.2 (45.0)	4.4 (39.9)
Average rainfall mm (inches)	55.7 (2.19)	55.4 (2.18)	59.6 (2.35)	81.5 (3.21)	99.2 (3.91)	103 (4.1)	136.2 (5.36)	134.9 (5.31)	101.9 (4.01)	87.2 (3.43)	75.7 (2.98)	71.5 (2.81)	1,061.8 (41.84)
Average rainy days (≥ 0.2 mm)	5.9	5.8	7.2	8.4	8.8	11.5	12.8	14.4	12.4	9.8	8.1	7.5	112.6
Source 1: Bureau of Meteorology, Meander Rainfall
Source 2: Bureau of Meteorology, Deloraine (Athol) Temperature

== Bibliography ==
- Cassidy, Jill (1995). The Dairy Heritage of Northern Tasmania. Launceston: Queen Victoria Museum and Art Gallery. ISBN 0-7246-4240-4.
- Bennett, Maureen (1984). Pioneer Estates of Deloraine. Deloraine: National Trust of Australia (Tasmania, Deloraine Group).
- Berne, Eve (1991). "Chapter 3: In Quamby's shadow – white settlement and Chapter 9: Churches". Meander Valley memories. Meander: Meander Primary School. pp. 19–31, 110–117. ISBN 0-646-04684-5.
- Berne, Eve; Boxhall, Geraldine; Chilcott, Christine (1991). "Chapter 8: Public Facilities". Meander Valley memories. Meander: Meander Primary School. pp. 105–109. ISBN 0-646-04684-5.
- Boxhall, Geraldine; Berne, Eve; Berne, Dianne (1991). "Chapter 12: Clubs, organisations and sport". Meander Valley memories. Meander: Meander Primary School. pp. 151–166. ISBN 0-646-04684-5.
- Boxhall, Geraldine (1991). "Chapter 10: Industry, shops and businesses and Chapter 14: Newsmakers". Meander Valley memories. Meander: Meander Primary School. pp. 118–142. ISBN 0-646-04684-5.
- Breen, Shayne (1991). "Chapter 1: The Pall-i-torre and Chapter 2: Black and White: The struggle for the land". Meander Valley memories. Meander: Meander Primary School. pp. 1–18. ISBN 0-646-04684-5.
- Greenhill, Virginia (2002). In the blink of an eye. Westbury: Westbury historical society.
- Evans, Kathryn; Terry, Ian (October 2004). Meander Valley Heritage Study, Stage 1: Thematic History. Meander Valley Council.
- Skerratt, Terri (1991). "Chapter 4: Jackey's Marsh". Meander Valley memories. Meander: Meander Primary School. pp. 36–41. ISBN 0-646-04684-5.
- Stephens, Geoffrey (1991). The Anglican Church in Tasmania. A diocesan history to mark the sesquicentenary. Hobart: Trustees of the Diocese. ISBN 064606813X.
- Woods, Patricia; Pennicott, Graeme (1991). "Chapter 7: Schools". Meander Valley memories. Meander: Meander Primary School. pp. 69–41. ISBN 0-646-04684-5.
