= Mole Creek =

- Town
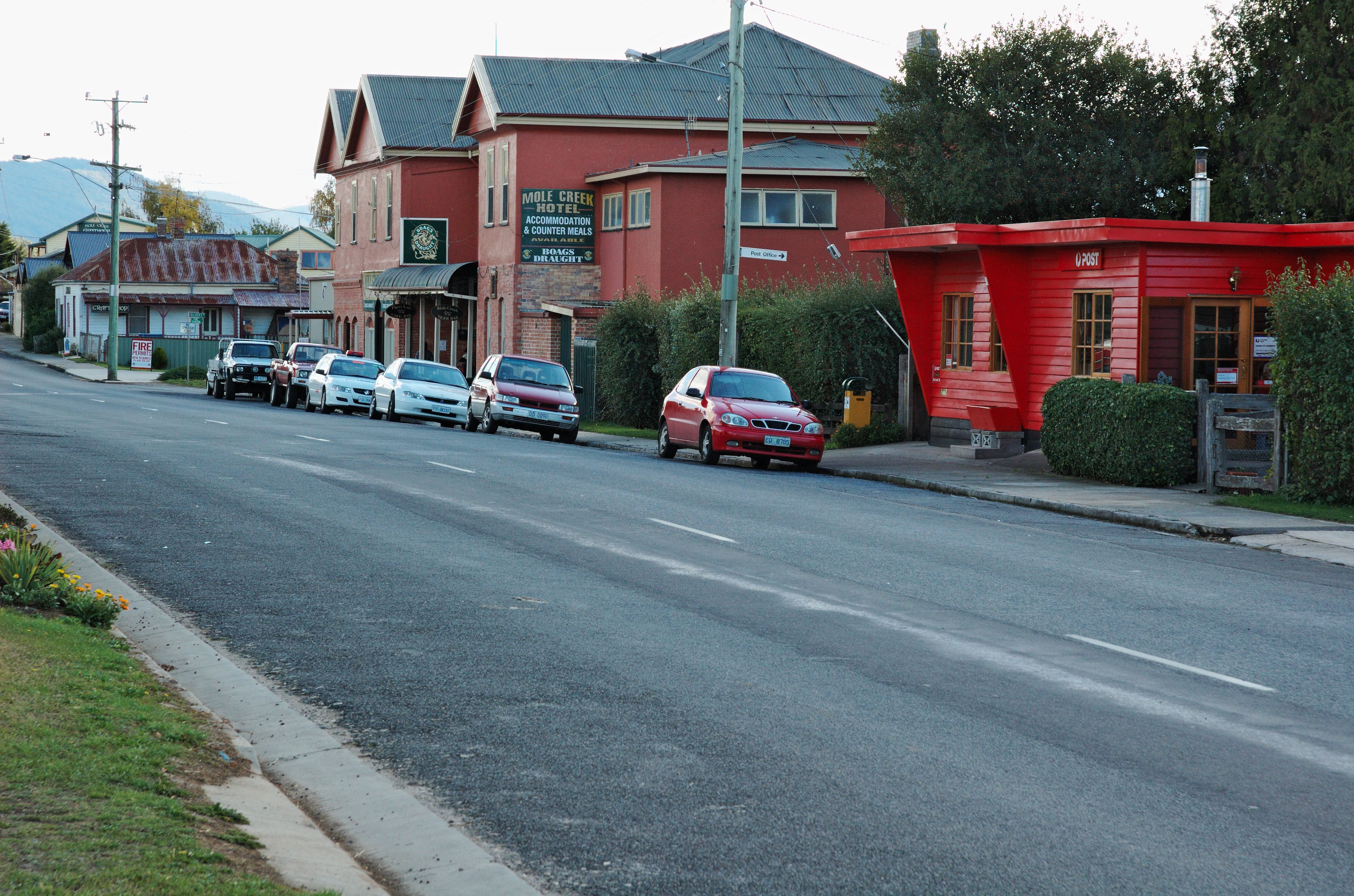
- Mole Creek Hotel and post office.

- Coordinates: 41.5570°S 146.4077°E
- Country: Australia
- State: Tasmania
- LGA: Meander Valley Council
- Location: 228 km (142 mi) N of Hobart; 76 km (47 mi) W of Launceston; 25 km (16 mi) W of Deloraine

Government
  - State electorate: Lyons
  - Federal division: Lyons
- Elevation: 240 m (790 ft)

Population
  - Total: 609 (2011 census)
- Postcode: 7304
- Mean max temp: 16.1 °C (61.0 °F)
- Mean min temp: 4.4 °C (39.9 °F)
- Annual rainfall: 1,125 mm (44.3 in)

Mole Creek is a town in the upper Mersey Valley, in the central north of Tasmania, Australia. Mole Creek is well known for its honey and accounts for about 35 percent of Tasmania's honey production. The locality is in the Meander Valley Council area, but with about 3% in the Kentish Council LGA.

== History ==
Australian Aboriginals have lived on the island of Tasmania for thousands of years. The earliest archaeological evidence for Aboriginal habitation of Tasmania is from the valley of the Forth River, 35000 years before the present. Prior to European settlement, Mole Creek, along with much of the surrounding area, was part of the lands of the Pallittorre Aboriginal tribe. Their range included Deloraine, the face of the Great Western Tiers, and the Gog mountain range to the north of Mole Creek where they mined ochre in the Toolumbunner ochre pits. There is evidence that they had been settled in the Mole Creek area for at least 10,000 years. As Europeans moved onto their land the two groups came into conflict, many Aboriginal people and some Europeans were killed. Their population in the area has been estimated to drop from 200 to 60 during 1827–30.

During the 1820s, the Van Diemen's Land Company cut a stock route from Deloraine to Emu Bay (now known as Burnie) via Chudleigh and Mole Creek. Prior to this cattlemen had run cattle and built stockman's huts on the land west of Westbury. From the 1820s onwards land grants began being issued as the land was gradually surveyed. A systemic exploration of Mole Creek and the area west was conducted in 1826 by Edward Curr, Joseph Fossey and Henry Hellyer. Mole Creek was originally a mixture of tall forest, plains and boggy marsh. Settlers in the early 19th century cleared the land largely using fire and the ring barking of trees. The land was first held in large leaseholds by the wealthiest in the colony of Tasmania. In the mid-19th century a number of waste lands acts were passed by the government allowing for smaller holdings, opening up the then densely forested land around the town of Mole Creek. Many of these first settlers were farm labourers or ex-convicts, who had worked as labourers or tenant farmers on the larger holdings.

The name Mole Creek comes from a nearby stream, recorded as early as the Land Commissioner's reports' maps from 1826 to 1828. This creek flows above ground, and in portions underground through the caves underlying the area. The caves of the nearby Mole Creek Karst National Park, which include the show caves Marakoopa Cave and King Solomons Cave, have attracted tourists since the 1850s. Their popularity encouraged the establishment of tourist facilities in Mole Creek including Howe's Boarding House and Lee's Mountain View Guest House. By 1876 the town had a water-powered flour mill and water powered saw mill. At the same time a Wesleyan chapel and minister's residence were being constructed. A post office opened on 28 May 1884 though the town remained small. A former resident remembered Mole Creek in the 1890s as "a small bush settlement". Lime kilns were built at Mole Creek in the late 19th century, taking advantage of the extensive limestone in the area.

=== 20th century ===
In the early 20th century the opening of some scenic caves for tourism lead to further development in the town. King Solomon's Cave was discovered in 1906 and opened for tours in 1908. Marakoopa cave was found in 1910, opened in 1912 and sold to the state tourist department in 1919. Edward Charles James, who had obtained a lease on King Solomon's Cave, built what is now the Mole creek hotel over 1907–8 as a 30-room guest house. Due to some unusual sale conditions he could not serve alcohol. The building was sold in 1910 to George Lee who ran it as the Mountain View Guest House. A grocery and hardware shop ran from part of the building from 1929 to 1965. In June 1953 the sale conditions were overcome and a licence to serve alcohol was granted. (Note: The history of the hotel's use is recorded in a commemorative sign in its lobby)

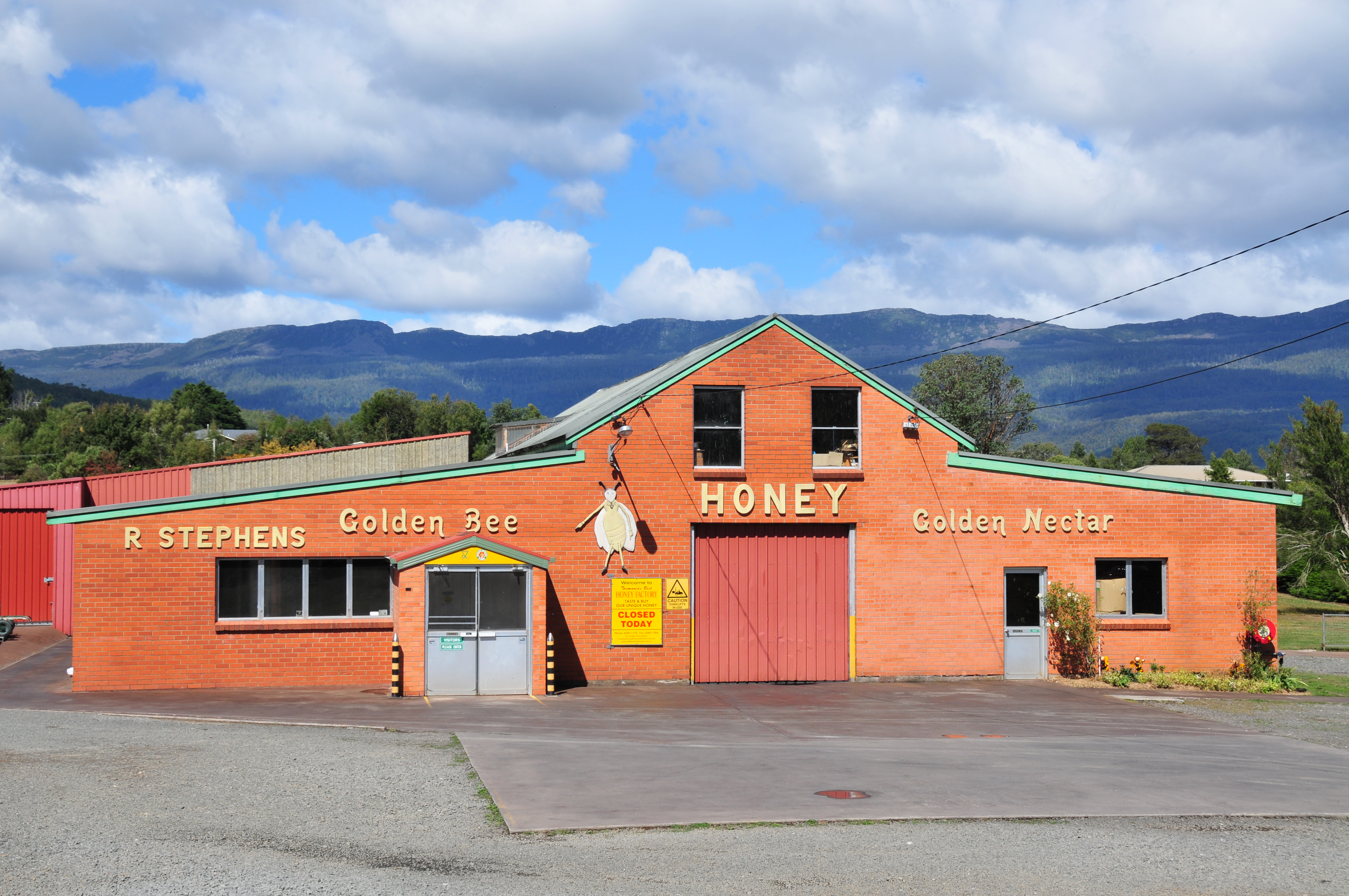
R Stephens honey factory

Robert Stephens had kept bees as a hobby. After he returned from service in World War I he continued his interest. He opened a commercial honey production facility in Mole Creek in 1918. By 1923 the factory had 50 hives and was selling honey under the Golden Bee brand. Since 1951 it has concentrated on leatherwood honey. Each year hives are transported to Tasmania's west coast to make honey with the distinctive flavour of leatherwood (Eucryphia lucida and Eucryphia milliganii). The Factory and Apiary are provisionally registered on the Tasmanian Heritage Register. It has operated on the same 2-acre (0.81 ha) site since operations began; the oldest building is a c.1920 timber cottage and the prominent façade that faces the main road dates from the 1970s. The factory is run by Stephen's decedents using the "Golden Bee" label introduced in 1930 and the "Golden Nectar" label for leatherwood honey introduced 1951. As of 2010 it was producing 350 tonnes (390 tons) of honey each year and approximately 35% of all Tasmanian honey.

Electricity, supplied by the Hydroelectric Commission, reached Mole Creek in 1936 and street lighting was installed soon after. Construction of a memorial hall began at the end of 1950, funded by a state government grant of 1000 pounds. A driving force behind construction was the school's lack of a recreation hall forcing them to on occasion rent the Methodist Hall. The Mole Creek bush nursing centre was opened in mid-1944. and came under control of the Launceston Public Hospitals District Board in 1968. The site is now a health centre housing the Mole Creek Child Health Centre and is operated by the Department of Health and Human Services.

=== Railway ===
A rail line was opened in 1890. It ran 20.4 kilometres (12.7 mi) to Mole Creek, through Chudleigh, from a junction near Deloraine on the Western Line. There was a plan to extend the line further west and government surveyors employed to this end. The survey was cancelled in 1891 and by 1900 there was no longer an expectation that the line would be extended to Tasmania's west coast. Throughout its existence, it carried mostly timber destined for the paper mill at Burnie and, in later days, woodchips for Bell Bay. From the 1920s passenger services, which on occasion ran as far as Devonport, were mostly conducted by railcars. From the 1970s to the 1980s the track saw extensive use transporting limestone to South Burnie. The rail extension was closed in 1985 and the track lifted in 1992.

=== Religion ===
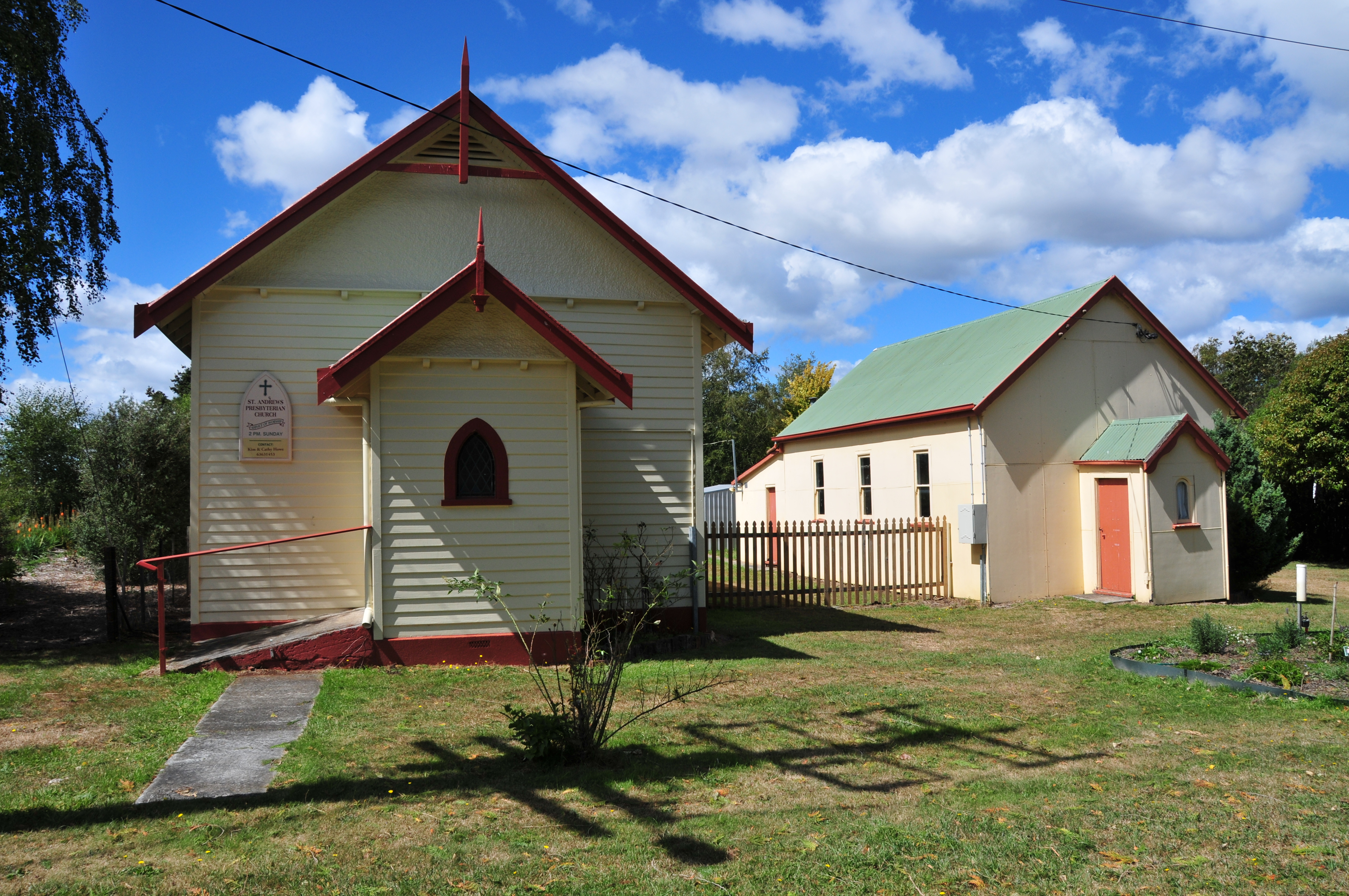
St Andrew's Presbyterian Church

The Deloraine Wesleyan district decided, in 1875, to erect a chapel in Mole creek. Construction began on the Methodist (Wesleyan) church, on donated land, and an associated cottage in late 1876. It was completed in 1878, then enlarged in 1880, at which time the original building was moved to the rear and used as a supper room. An adjacent church hall was added in 1919. The Wesleyan chapel was rented by the Government for a school from at least June 1879. A new parsonage was built and opened in 1956 but was subsequently sold to Forestry Tasmania in 1972. In 1976, along with most Methodist churches in Australia, it became part of the Uniting Church in Australia. It was still used as of 1996 but was subsequently closed and sold. (Note: Online sale records date the closure to prior to 2009.)

A news report in 1900 reports that, in addition to the Wesleyan weatherboard church, there was a Baptist church and in 1905 the town had a Seventh-day Adventist church. In the 19th century Anglican services were held in the Wesleyan chapel. St Columba's Anglican church was built in Mole Creek and dedicated in September 1902 by Bishop Henry Montgomery and Gilbert White, a missionary. The church was in the parish of Deloraine and was closed in the early 1990s. Mole Creek's only remaining church is part of the Presbyterian Church of Tasmania, in the Presbytery of Bass. St Andrew's church was consecrated 12 September 1932. It celebrated its 40th anniversary in 1972 and remains in use.

== Geography and climate ==
The town of Mole Creek lies at 240 metres (790 ft) above sea level. The Mole Creek-Chudleigh karst is an area underlain by limestone with underground streams, sinkholes and caves. It was formed when Gondwanaland was covered by a shallow sea approximately 500 million years ago. The area has outcrops of Ordovician limestone known as the Chudleigh Subgroup, which is 1,200 metres (3,900 ft) and is host to seven fossiliferous formations. The town is surrounded by a plain underlain by this limestone which crops up through the overlying sediments. Nearby hills have prominent basalt, limestone and dolerite depending on location. The flats are of alluvial origin with Permian sediments formed from mudstone and sandstone. The karst is riddled with over 400 caves and sinkholes, some of which are open to the public. King Solomon's Cave and the Marakoopa Caves became part of a state cave reserve in 1939. The caves and many other parts of the karst became part of the Mole Creek Karst National Park when it was formed in 1996. The agricultural land around Mole Creek is mostly suited to grazing, intensive in some areas, though some is marginal cropping land that requires careful crop rotation with seasons where the land must be left fallow.

Mole creek has a cool temperate climate. The area is notably frosty in winter and experiences the occasional snowfall. The average rainfall of 1,125 millimetres (44.3 in) (Note: 1,122mm of average rainfall is derived from weather records over 1914 to 2015) is significantly higher than parts of the Meander Valley Council area further to the east. The average rainfall has noticeably declined over the past 3–4 decades.

Climate data for Deloraine (Station 091000 temperature), Mole Creek (Station 091065 rainfall)
Month	Jan	Feb	Mar	Apr	May	Jun	Jul	Aug	Sep	Oct	Nov	Dec	Year
Mean daily maximum °C (°F)	21.3 (70.3)	22.5 (72.5)	19.6 (67.3)	16.5 (61.7)	13.2 (55.8)	10.9 (51.6)	10.4 (50.7)	11.4 (52.5)	13.3 (55.9)	15.5 (59.9)	17.7 (63.9)	20.1 (68.2)	16.1 (61.0)
Mean daily minimum °C (°F)	7.7 (45.9)	8.7 (47.7)	6.3 (43.3)	4.5 (40.1)	2.7 (36.9)	1.0 (33.8)	0.9 (33.6)	1.2 (34.2)	3.1 (37.6)	4.4 (39.9)	5.4 (41.7)	7.2 (45.0)	4.4 (39.9)
Average rainfall mm (inches)	52.9 (2.08)	59.7 (2.35)	60.6 (2.39)	83.6 (3.29)	109.5 (4.31)	113.9 (4.48)	147.6 (5.81)	145.6 (5.73)	113.1 (4.45)	93.3 (3.67)	72.1 (2.84)	68 (2.7)	1,125.1 (44.30)
Source 1: Bureau of Meteorology, Deloraine (Athol).
Source 2: Bureau of Meteorology, Mole Creek.

== School ==
Mole Creek Primary school is a government school for students from kindergarten to grade 6 that has, as of 2015, 76 students. There was a state school in Mole Creek by 1900. It was changed to a district or area school in 1936. A single-room school building, and associated teacher's residence, had been constructed over 1892–93 in Caveside. When the school was closed in 1937 the building was moved to Mole Creek in 1938 and used for 'domestic arts' at school. Western Creek, near Meander, had a school from 1893 to 1938. After it closed some students attended Meander's school, but others moved to schools at Mole Creek and Deloraine. This school building was also moved and added to those at Mole Creek's school. The primary school services surrounding districts including Chudleigh and Caveside. The nearest high school is in Deloraine.

== Current town ==
The town is named after Mole Creek, a tributary of the Mersey River. This creek is named due to the way that it appears above ground, descends below ground into the limestone cave system, then reappears multiple times. The main industries in the area are forestry, farming, limestone mining and the R Stephen's honey factory. One of the largest non-farm employers in the area is Unimim Lime Limited. They quarry and process limestone to make quicklime and hydrated lime. As of 2007 they employed 28 people at Mole Creek Mole Creek is well known for its honey and accounts for about 35 percent of Tasmania's honey production including leatherwood honey—a noted monofloral honey—which is unique to Tasmania and sold internationally.

Nearby is the Mole Creek Karst National Park, which includes the show caves Marakoopa Cave and King Solomons Cave. These caves have been popular with tourists for over 100 years. Trowunna Wildlife Park is a 65-acre (26 ha) private sanctuary a short distance on the main road towards Chudleigh. The park contains native Australian animals both in enclosures and free-ranging. It works as part of the effort to preserve Tasmanian devils by keeping a population that are free of facial tumour disease, and runs as a training centre for animal handling and animal keeping. Other animals at the park include spotted-tail quolls, eastern quolls, wombats, grey kangaroos, red-necked wallabies, pademelons, potoroos, bettongs, bandicoots, pygmy possums, wedge-tailed eagles, brown falcons, goshawks, owls, green rosellas, black swans, ducks, honeyeaters, wrens and robins.

Mole Creek has a volunteer fire brigade. It first ran from 1956 to 1962 and was disbanded due to lack of local interest. A district brigade and fire station had been re-established by 1970. The town had a cricket club by the early 20th century and an Australian rules football club by 1946. The football club still exists and plays in the Leven Football Association. The cricket club plays in the Northern Midlands Cricket Association. The town has a community maintained swimming pool. Mole Creek's cemetery opened in 1916, serving also Caveside, and remains open. Mole Creek has a hotel, established in 1907, a guest house and restaurant, a swimming pool and adjacent community hall, supermarket, service station, post office and a church.

Mole Creek is in the Meander Valley Council local government area, the Division of Lyons—for the state house of assembly and the federal house of representatives— and the state legislative council electoral division of Western Tiers. At the 2011 census, Mole Creek's statistical area—covering 217.2 square kilometres (83.9 sq mi)—had a population of 609 though the town itself had only 230.

== Bibliography ==
- Australian Garden History Society (July 2006). Blue Gum, Newsletter # 89 (PDF). Australian Garden History Society, Tasmanian Branch. Archived from the original on 18 May 2015.
- Davey, Lance (July 2010). Meander Valley Agriculture study. Meander Valley Council; Department of Economic Development, Tourism & the Arts.
- Evans, Kathryn; Terry, Ian (October 2004). Meander Valley Heritage Study, Stage 1: Thematic History. Meander Valley Council.
- Green, Frank C. (1969). Servant of the House. Heinemann.
- Jupp, James (2001). The Australian People: An Encyclopedia of the Nation, Its People and Their Origins. Cambridge University Press. ISBN 9780521807890.
- Henslowe, Dorothea (1978). Our heritage of Anglican churches in Tasmania. Moonah, Tasmania: Mercury-Walch. ISBN 090962514X.
- Holland, Steve; Holland, Robyn (2000). Australians. Steve Holland. ISBN 9780731808205.
- Lloyd, Sarah (2012). The edge : a natural history of Tasmania's Great Western Tiers. Friends of Jacky's Marsh inc. ISBN 978-0-646-57082-2.
- Miller R S, ed. (1973). Presbyterian Church of Tasmania. Triple jubilee 1973. Hobart: Presbytery of Tasmania.
- Parks and Wildlife Service (2004). Mole Creek Karst National Park and Conservation Area, Management Plan 2004. Hobart: Parks and Wildlife Service, Department of Tourism, Parks, Heritage and the Arts. ISBN 0975059998.
- Reunion Committee for the Reunion of Caveside and Chudleigh Schools and District (1994). As the lobster flows : Caveside-Chudleigh, an historical record. Devonport. ISBN 064618010X.
- Stansall, Max (1975). Tasmanian Methodism. Launceston: Methodist Church of Australasia. ISBN 0909834091.
- Stephens, Geoffrey (1991). The Anglican Church in Tasmania. A diocesan history to mark the sesquicentenary, 1992. Hobart: Trustees of the Diocese. ISBN 064606813X.
- Stokes, H.J.W (September 1994). The Lemana Junction - Mole Creek Line. Australian Railway Historical Society Bulletin.
- Sydney, James (1996). The blazed track. Launceston: Regal Press. ISBN 1876261005.
- Topoclimate Services (2002). Meander Valley Council : land capability survey & mapping consultancy report & maps. Meander Valley Council.
- Whitworth, Robert Percy (1877). Baillière's Tasmanian gazetteer and road quide : containing the most recent and accurate information as to every place in the colony. Hobart: F.F. Bailliere.
- Woods, Patricia; Pennicott, Graeme (1991). "Chapter 7: Schools". Meander Valley memories. Meander: Meander Primary School. pp. 69–41. ISBN 0-646-04684-5.
