= Extractas Bioscience =

Company in Tasmania, Australia

Extractas Bioscience (formerly called Tasmanian Alkaloids) is the largest opium poppy processing company in the Australian state of Tasmania. Tasmanian Alkaloids was a subsidiary of the United States pharmaceutical company Johnson & Johnson, but was formerly—as of 1980—a subsidiary of Abbott Laboratories.

The company patented a poppy variety called "Norman" which was stated, in the 1999 Tasmanian Alkaloids Poppy Grower’s Bulletin to be the first variety lacking morphine and codeine, while still containing thebaine and oripavine. This variety went into commercial production in 1998. The company's processing plant is in Westbury, a town west of Launceston in the State's north. The company is licensed by both the Australian federal and state governments to carry out its opiate processing work.
