= Elizabeth Town, Tasmania =

Elizabeth Town
- Town
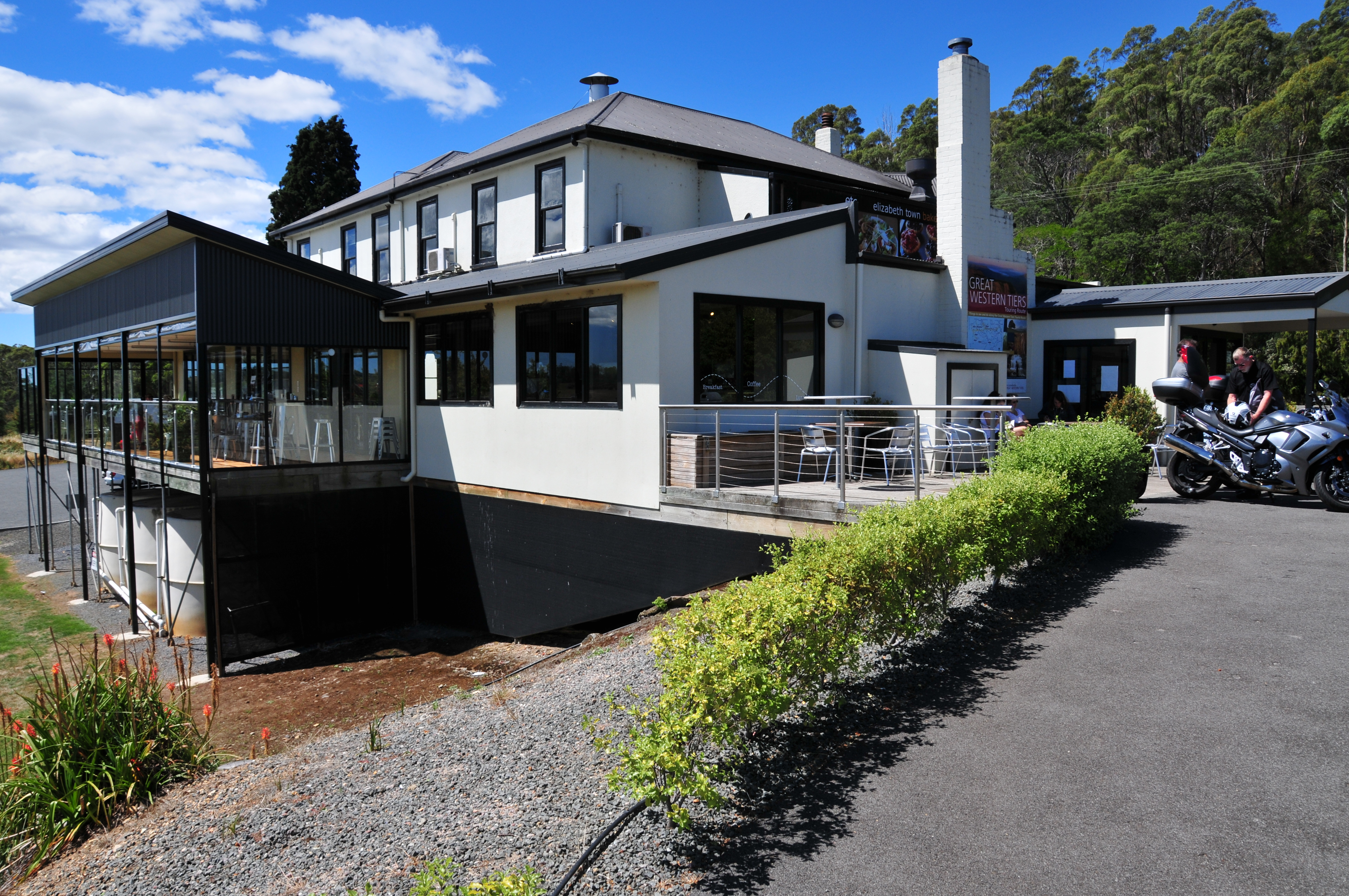
- ETC cafe and bakery on Bass Highway

- Coordinates: 41°27′S 146°34′E
- Country: Australia
- State: Tasmania
- LGA: Meander Valley Council
- Location: 213 km (132 mi) N of Hobart; 57 km (35 mi) W of Launceston; 9 km (5.6 mi) NW of Deloraine

Government
  - State electorate: Lyons
  - Federal division: Lyons

Population
  - Total: 502 (2006 census)
- Postcode: 7304

Elizabeth Town is a populated rural area in Meander Valley, Tasmania bisected by the Bass Highway, midway between Devonport and Launceston.

The area is largely a farming district. Significant agricultural enterprises include organic dairy producer Elgaar Farm, berry producer Christmas Hills Raspberry Farm and the Ashgrove Cheese Farm.

Land grants began in the area from the 1820s, and later a town was laid out based on 10 acres (4.0 ha) allotments. Until the 1970s, when some land was further subdivided on the east side of what is now the Bass Highway, the town area had only three houses and had not become a population centre. Consequent to the subdivision more dwellings were built and there were more than forty by 2002. At the 2006 census, the Elizabeth Town area had a population of 502. John Spicer built and opened a hotel on the road from Deloraine north to Devonport in the 1850s. Just prior to 1900 the then owner, Charles Slater, demolished the building replaced it with the current structure. Slater had used money from a lottery win to build the new hotel. The hotel, which sits by the Bass Highway, is now run as ETC—the Elizabeth Town café.

Elizabeth once had a school, tennis courts, a Catholic church, an Anglican church, post office and a hall. Of these only two church buildings remain converted to houses. A post office opened on in September 1860, with a resident post master, and closed in 1969.

The Tasmanian Archdiocese extended Roman Catholic services to cover Elizabeth Town in 1924. A new church was built and first held services 22 January 1939. It was a contemporary style 45-by-20-foot (13.7 by 6.1 m) brick building with a tiled roof, concrete slab foundation, Tasmanian hardwood ceiling and coloured leadlight windows. The church's land had been donated by Mr T Clearly, then owner of the hotel. The Church of Our Lady Help of Christians was designed to hold 100 parishioners. Anglican services were first held in the Elizabeth Town state school. The foundation stone for the Anglican Holy Cross church was laid in January 1892 and it opened for services in January 1893. This church was replaced in the 1950s and a five sided apsidal sanctuary was built in 1955 and dedicated in August of the same year. The building was remodelled and had a vestry added in 1966. The church celebrated its 60th anniversary in December 1952, but by was only used for Christmas services. The church closed and a decision to sell it made in 2011 by the Parish of Deloraine to sell this in 2011.

== Bibliography ==
- Henslowe, Dorothea (1978). Our heritage of Anglican churches in Tasmania. Moonah, Tasmania: Mercury-Walch. ISBN 090962514X.
- Stephens, Geoffrey (1991). The Anglican Church in Tasmania. A diocesan history to mark the sesquicentenary. Hobart: Trustees of the Diocese. ISBN 064606813X.
- Greenhill, Virginia (2002). In the blink of an eye. Westbury: Westbury historical society.
