= Meander River (Tasmania) =

River in Tasmania, Australia

Meander The Western River
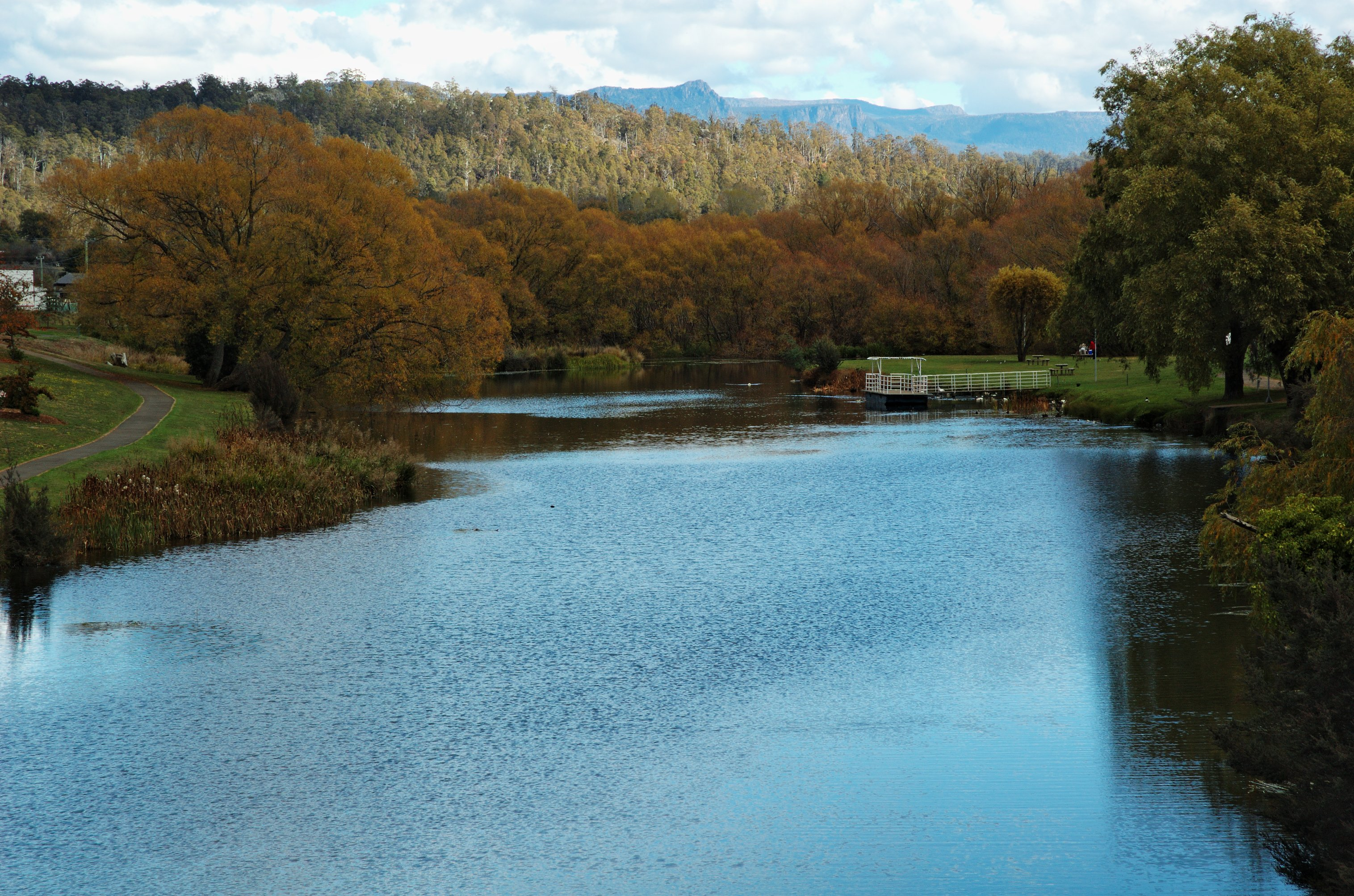
- The Meander, flowing through the Deloraine Green

- Location of the Meander River mouth in Tasmania

Location
- Country: Australia
- State: Tasmania
- Region: Central Highlands (Tasmania), Northern Tasmania
- Settlements: Meander, Deloraine

Physical characteristics
- Source: Great Western Tiers
  - elevation: 1,300 m (4,300 ft)
- Mouth: South Esk River
  - location: Hadspen
  - coordinates: 41°30′29″S 147°03′12″E
  - elevation: 129 m (423 ft)
- Length: 112 km (70 mi)
- Basin size: 1,600 km^{2} (620 sq mi)

Basin features
- River system: South Esk River
- Tributaries
  - right: Western Creek, Quamby Brook, Liffey River
- Reservoirs: Lake Huntsman

The Meander River is a major perennial river in the central northern region of Tasmania, Australia. Until the founding of Westbury in the early 1820s, the river was known as the Western River.

== Location and features ==
The Meander River rises in the Great Western Tiers and flows past its namesake town, Meander, through the major regional town of Deloraine, then eastward, where it flows into the South Esk River near Hadspen. From source to mouth, the river is joined by fourteen tributaries including the Liffey River and descends 930 metres (3,050 ft) over its 112-kilometre (70 mi) course.

Impounded by the Meander Dam in 2007 to create Lake Huntsman, the reservoir was established for the principal purpose of delivering a reliable supply of irrigation water to the Meander Valley, and also supplies water for the Huntsman Lake Power Station, a small conventional hydroelectric power station.

== Recreation ==
The Meander is a popular trout fishing stream holding brown trout. The World Fly Fishing Championships organized by the International Confederation of Sport Fishing has selected the Meander as one of its venues for the 2019 championships to be held in Tasmania.

== See also ==
- Rivers of Tasmania
