= Deloraine, Tasmania =

Deloraine
- Town
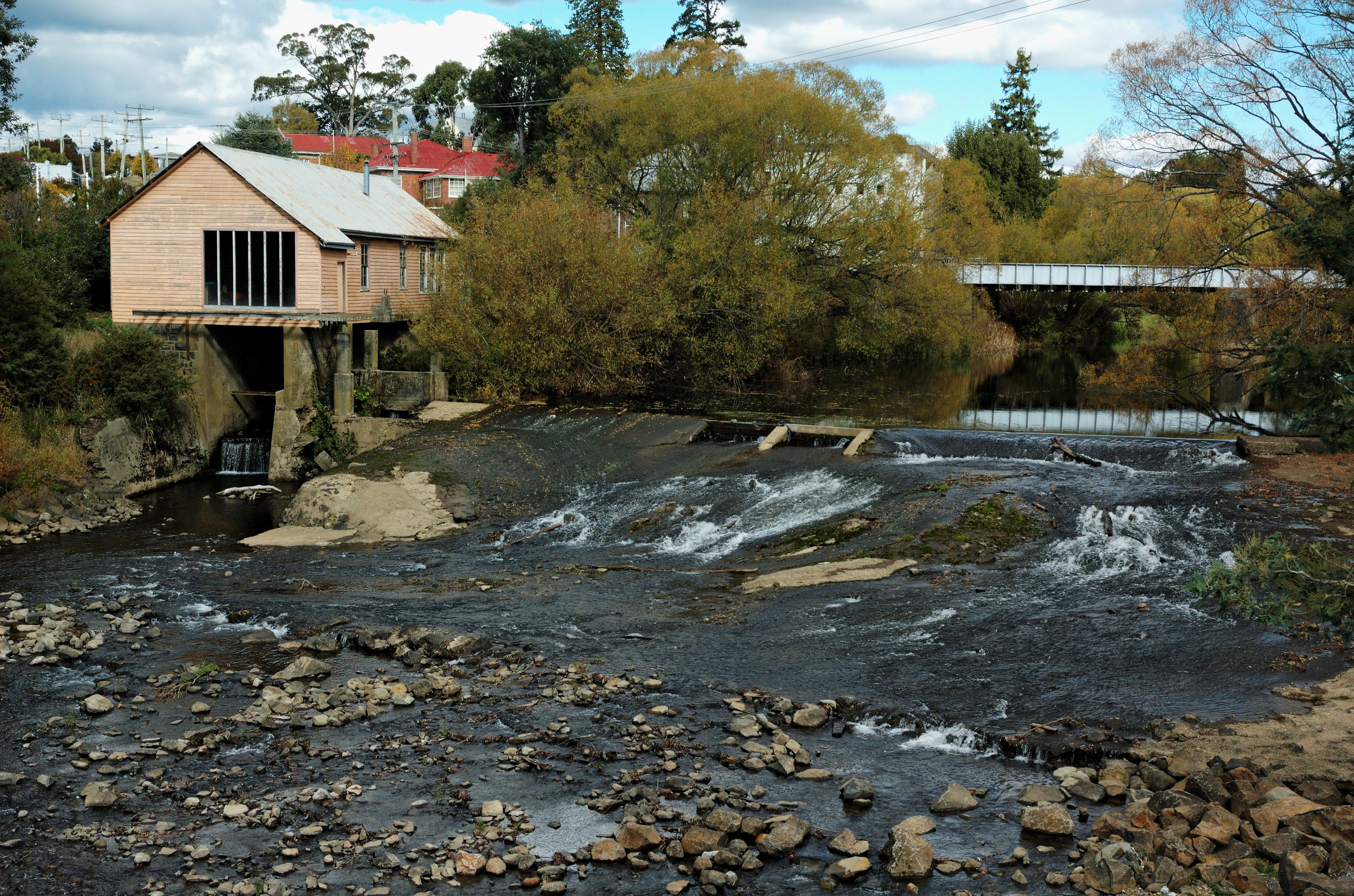
- The Meander River weir.

- Coordinates: 41°32′S 146°40′E
- Country: Australia
- State: Tasmania
- LGA: Meander Valley Council
- Location: 50 km (31 mi) from Launceston; 52 km (32 mi) from Devonport; 248 km (154 mi) from Hobart

Government
  - State electorate: Lyons
  - Federal division: Lyons
- Elevation: 237 m (778 ft)

Population
  - Total: 3,035 (2021 census)
- Postcode: 7304
- Mean max temp: 16 °C (61 °F)
- Mean min temp: 4.4 °C (39.9 °F)
- Annual rainfall: 945.7 mm (37.23 in)

Deloraine is a town on the Meander River, in the central north of Tasmania, Australia. It is 50 kilometres (31 mi) west of Launceston and 52 kilometres (32 mi) south of Devonport along the Bass Highway. It is part of the Meander Valley Council. Deloraine recorded a population of 3,035 in the 2021 census. Deloraine, like most Tasmanian towns, has a temperate and wet climate.

== History ==
The region was explored in 1821 by Captain Roland, who was searching for farm land. The land was granted to new settlers, and the town is now a major agricultural centre, with a large number of farms of all types in the area. Deloraine is named after a character from the poem The Lay of the Last Minstrel, written by Sir Walter Scott.

Deloraine Post Office opened on 29 October 1836.

The town experienced a number of murders in the early years, including the sensational trial of 76-year-old Timothy Walker for the murder of Benjamin Hampton on 2 December 1886. Walker had threatened the niece of Hampton when he received a negative response to his question "Are me and you friends now?". Hampton then came to the location, whereupon Walker fatally discharged a shotgun to Hampton. Walker appeared before the Hobart Criminal Sittings, the jury made no recommendation of mercy, and the death sentence was pronounced. He went to the gallows on the morning of Monday 10 January 1887. Walker had been sent to the British colony of Van Diemen's Land years prior with "transportation for life". Walker was given to be the last transported convict to be executed in Tasmania.

Through the 1980s, a now-notorious paedophile was offending while rector at Saint Mark's Anglican Church.

In existence from 1985 until the late 1990s, the Deloraine Highlanders was originally formed for an RSL state conference, with the drummers drawn from the Deloraine District Youth Orchestra. They competed in the state pipe band championships, and assisted in local Anzac Day marches.

The town won the State Tidy Towns award in 1992, 1993 and 1995, and the Australian Community of the Year award in 1997.

== Economy ==
While Deloraine is a predominantly rural farming town, it is also aimed at pleasing tourists, who visit because of its culture and location also serving as a base to explore areas such as Cradle Mountain, the Great Western Tiers, Mole Creek and the Central Highlands. Farms in the area produce poppies, herbs, onions and potatoes; as is typical produce for the Tasmanian climate. Deloraine is also home to the 41° South salmon and ginseng aqua farm.

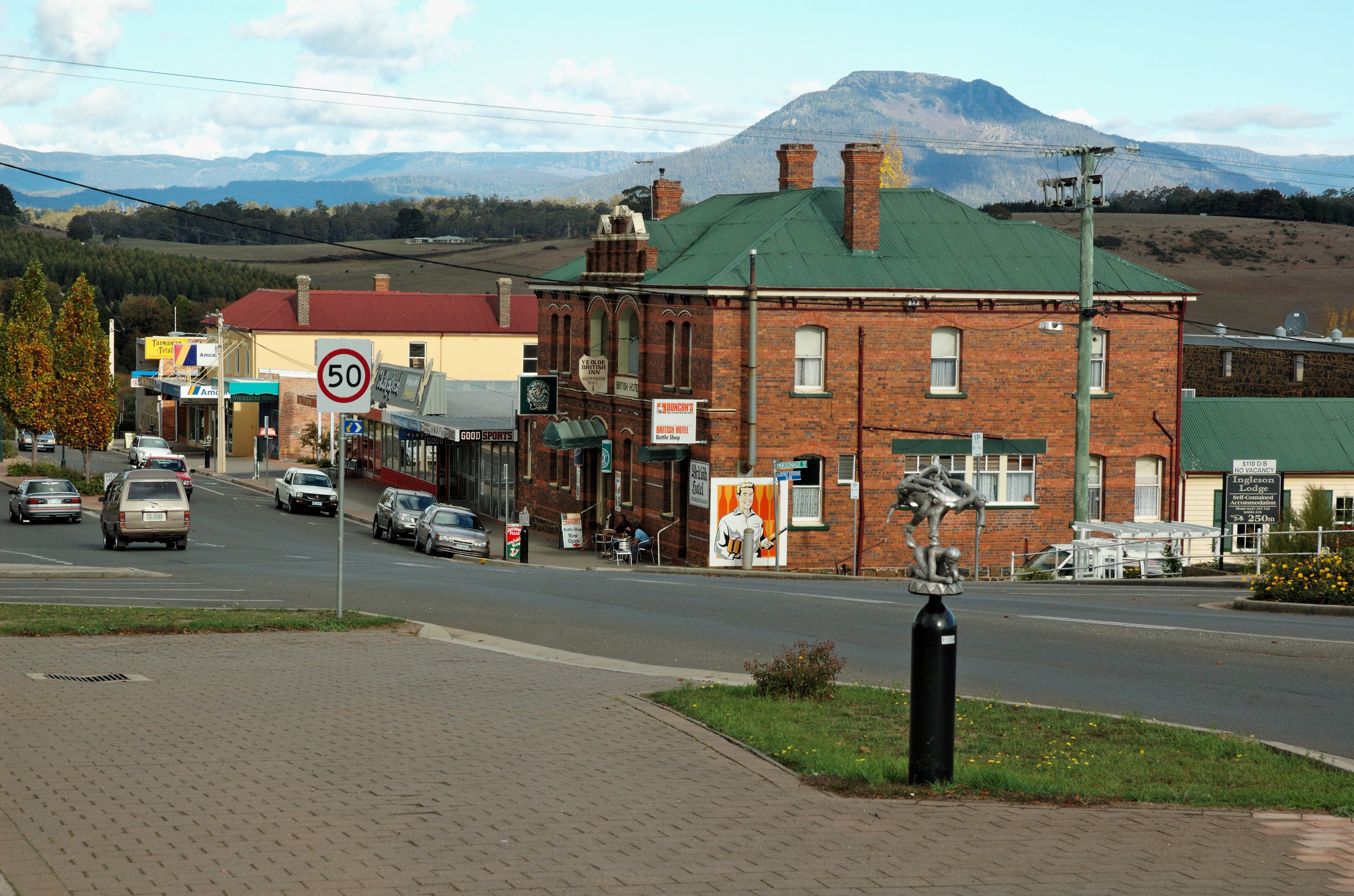
The main street of Deloraine, with the Great Western Tiers in the background.

The town currently operates two sawmills previously owned by Gunns as well as facilities that manufacture fertiliser, farm equipment, water tanks and street signs. The nearby opium processing factory, Tasmanian Alkaloids, located in Westbury offers some employment for the town.

Deloraine is in the Launceston licence area for television and radio and is served by ABC Television, SBS Television, Tasmanian Digital Television, Southern Cross Tasmania, WIN Television, 91.7 ABC Northern Tasmania and other ABC radio networks, commercial stations 89.3 LAFM and 90.1 Chilli FM and community station 96.9 Meander Valley FM.

The annual Tasmanian Craft Fair takes place in Deloraine, it attracts around 18,000 people annually. During the craft fair, there are around 260 exhibitors demonstrating crafts in the town. Because of this, as well as the large population of artists, the town is considered a cultural centre.

== Infrastructure ==
Because of its location between the two cities of Launceston and Devonport, Deloraine is a transport hub for trade and tourists between the two cities. Most local infrastructure and commercial buildings such as supermarkets, shops, schools, bus routes are also used by the nearby town of Westbury, and the hamlets of Exton, Mole Creek and Meander.

The town has a telephone exchange, which is owned and operated by Telstra. Deloraine was one of the first trial towns in Australia to be connected to the fibre optic National Broadband Network (colloquially 'NBN'). As of 2013, Deloraine has a 40.8% fibre optic connection rate. As of 23 May 2014, Deloraine, along with George Town, Triabunna and Sorell, are the first all-fibre optic towns in Australia.

=== Transport ===
The Emu Bay/Meander Valley Road passes through the town.

One of the earliest railway lines in Tasmania was built between Launceston and Deloraine in 1871 to ship agricultural products into the city. It was constructed and operated by the private company, Launceston and Western Railway. The railway went bankrupt in 1872 after a mere year of operation and all assets were bought by the Tasmanian Government in 1873.

Access to Deloraine is provided by the Bass Highway, part of Australia's National Highway, or by the older Meander Valley Road. Both the Meander River and a railway track that runs through the town from north Devonport through Deloraine and into Launceston and Central Tasmania. The train line is predominantly used for cargo with rare tourist train use.

The town was bypassed by the new Bass Highway in the early 1990s.

=== Health and education ===
Deloraine is the educational and health centre for the Meander Valley region, location of a library, online access centre, local museum and public and private primary school and a high school. As well as being host to several art galleries.

Deloraine is home to both a hospital/dental clinic and a doctor's practice, which are used by both the locals and neighbouring towns and villages.

== Climate ==
Climate data for Deloraine
Month	Jan	Feb	Mar	Apr	May	Jun	Jul	Aug	Sep	Oct	Nov	Dec	Year
Mean daily maximum °C (°F)	22.4 (72.3)	24.2 (75.6)	19.6 (67.3)	17.0 (62.6)	13.8 (56.8)	12.1 (53.8)	12.0 (53.6)	13.1 (55.6)	13.9 (57.0)	15.3 (59.5)	18.5 (65.3)	20.0 (68.0)	15.7 (60.3)
Daily mean °C (°F)	15.7 (60.3)	15.8 (60.4)	13.7 (56.7)	10.7 (51.3)	8.2 (46.8)	7.0 (44.6)	6.9 (44.4)	7.3 (45.1)	8.9 (48.0)	9.8 (49.6)	12.2 (54.0)	14.3 (57.7)	10.9 (51.6)
Mean daily minimum °C (°F)	9 (48)	9.1 (48.4)	7.8 (46.0)	4.3 (39.7)	2.5 (36.5)	1.9 (35.4)	1.8 (35.2)	1.5 (34.7)	3.8 (38.8)	4.2 (39.6)	5.8 (42.4)	8.6 (47.5)	5.0 (41.0)
Average rainfall mm (inches)	51 (2.0)	50 (2.0)	51 (2.0)	77 (3.0)	88 (3.5)	102 (4.0)	121 (4.8)	118 (4.6)	96 (3.8)	82 (3.2)	64 (2.5)	63 (2.5)	832 (32.8)
Mean monthly sunshine hours	294	250	227	200	148	132	137	149	190	244	247	267	2,485
Source 1: Meander Valley Climate Data
Source 2: World Weather and Climate

== Sister cities ==
Deloraine has one sister city, according to the Australian Sister Cities Association.

- Hokitika, New Zealand
