= Westbury, Tasmania =

Westbury
- Town
- Coordinates: 41°31′S 146°51′E
- Country: Australia
- State: Tasmania
- LGA: Meander Valley Council
- Location: 214 km (133 mi) N of Hobart; 36 km (22 mi) W of Launceston; 16 km (9.9 mi) E of Deloraine
- Established: 1828

Government
  - State electorate: Lyons
  - Federal division: Lyons
- Elevation: 207 m (679 ft)

Population
  - Total: 2,272 (2021 census)
- Postcode: 7303
- Mean max temp: 16.9 °C (62.4 °F)
- Mean min temp: 4.6 °C (40.3 °F)
- Annual rainfall: 834.1 mm (32.84 in)

Westbury is a town in the central north of Tasmania, Australia. It lies 30 km west of Launceston on the Bass Highway, and at the 2021 census had a population of 2,272. It is part of, and the headquarters of, the Meander Valley Council area.

The town of Westbury uses its location, within 2 hours drive of most tourist attractions in north and north west Tasmania, and its heritage buildings and scenery to promote the concept of Westbury as a unique place for tourists to stay in Northern Tasmania.

Westbury has a range of accommodation providers from high quality bed and breakfast style, colonial inn style and country hotel style.

The St Patrick's Festival is a major annual cultural activity that celebrates the historical links with Westbury and its early Irish community. The Festival celebrates via song and dance as well as a street parade and other family activities

On 30 September 2019 Westbury was named as the preferred location for the new Northern Tasmanian prison. The original site for the prison has since been abandoned and a new site further from Westbury is under investigation.

== History ==
The site was first surveyed in 1823. The town was laid out in 1828 by the Van Diemen's Land Company. In the 1830s Westbury developed as a garrison village. A detachment of troops commanded by Lieutenant Ball were stationed in Westbury in 1832. They were barracked around a village green in the centre of the town. The village green is still in use today and is claimed by the local community to be the only traditional English style village green in Australia. Westbury Post Office opened on 21 June 1832.

From early in the 19th century the village green has been the site for the Westbury St Patrick's Festival celebrating the town's Celtic links. Though Westbury is often described as a very "English village", the first European settlers were predominantly Irish; ex Irish convicts, retired soldiers and free settlers, many fleeing the Great Irish Famine in the 1840s. Gaelic was the local language in Westbury for many generations and a strong Irish brogue is reputed to have lasted throughout the 19th century.

Military pensioners were each granted a 5-acre (20,000 m^{2}) block of land complete with a well and pear tree. By the mid-1800s Westbury had become the largest military community in Tasmania. The town had a population of some 3,000 and an extensive grid street plan was surveyed preparing Westbury to become the predominant town in the north of Tasmania and the gateway to the north-west, but Deloraine has filled that role instead. Westbury remains a small town servicing the local agriculture industry.

The Westbury Primary School services the local community; students finishing primary school travel to Launceston or Deloraine to attend secondary education.

Westbury is named after Westbury, Wiltshire in England.

=== Climate ===
Westbury has an oceanic climate (Köppen: Cfb), with very mild, slightly drier summers and rather cold, wetter winters. Average maxima vary from 23.4 °C (74.1 °F) in February to 9.7 °C (49.5 °F) in July while average minima fluctuate between 8.5 °C (47.3 °F) in February and 0.6 °C (33.1 °F) in July. Mean average annual precipitation is moderate, 834.1 mm (32.84 in) spread between 131.1 precipitation days.

Climate data for Westbury (41º31'12"S, 146º48'36"E, 207 m AMSL) (1871-2014 normals)
Month	Jan	Feb	Mar	Apr	May	Jun	Jul	Aug	Sep	Oct	Nov	Dec	Year
Mean daily maximum °C (°F)	23.4 (74.1)	23.4 (74.1)	21.0 (69.8)	17.1 (62.8)	13.8 (56.8)	10.0 (50.0)	9.7 (49.5)	11.9 (53.4)	14.5 (58.1)	16.9 (62.4)	19.4 (66.9)	21.8 (71.2)	16.9 (62.4)
Mean daily minimum °C (°F)	8.2 (46.8)	8.5 (47.3)	7.2 (45.0)	4.7 (40.5)	2.4 (36.3)	1.0 (33.8)	0.6 (33.1)	1.7 (35.1)	3.0 (37.4)	4.4 (39.9)	5.8 (42.4)	7.5 (45.5)	4.6 (40.3)
Average precipitation mm (inches)	45.0 (1.77)	46.4 (1.83)	47.8 (1.88)	64.6 (2.54)	76.6 (3.02)	85.7 (3.37)	102.1 (4.02)	97.2 (3.83)	81.1 (3.19)	74.0 (2.91)	58.2 (2.29)	55.7 (2.19)	834.1 (32.84)
Average precipitation days (≥ 0.2 mm)	7.4	6.7	7.4	9.4	11.8	13.0	15.4	15.3	13.1	12.3	10.3	9.0	131.1
Source: Bureau of Meteorology (1871-2014 normals)

== Demographics ==
According to the 2021 Census:

- Westbury had a population of 2,272 in which males were counted at 1,118 (49.2%) and females counted at 1,156 (50.8%).
- There were 72 (3.2%) Aboriginal and Torres Strait Islander peoples and 2,120 (93.3%) non-Indigenous.
- 1,150 (50.6%) people had English ancestry, 988 (43.5%) had Australian ancestry, 267 (11.8%) had Irish ancestry, 226 (9.9%) had Scottish ancestry and 77 (3.4%) had Aboriginal ancestry.

As for religious affiliation, 98% of the population are Christians with the largest denominations being Anglicanism (42.5%), Methodism (27.3%), Catholicism (16.4%) and Presbyterianism (6.7%).

== Economy ==
Westbury's largest employer is Tasmanian Alkaloids, a company that specialises in the processing of poppies for pharmaceutical products. Other large employers are the Meander Valley Council, Tasmanian Aquaculture and the local primary school.

== Local tourism attractions ==
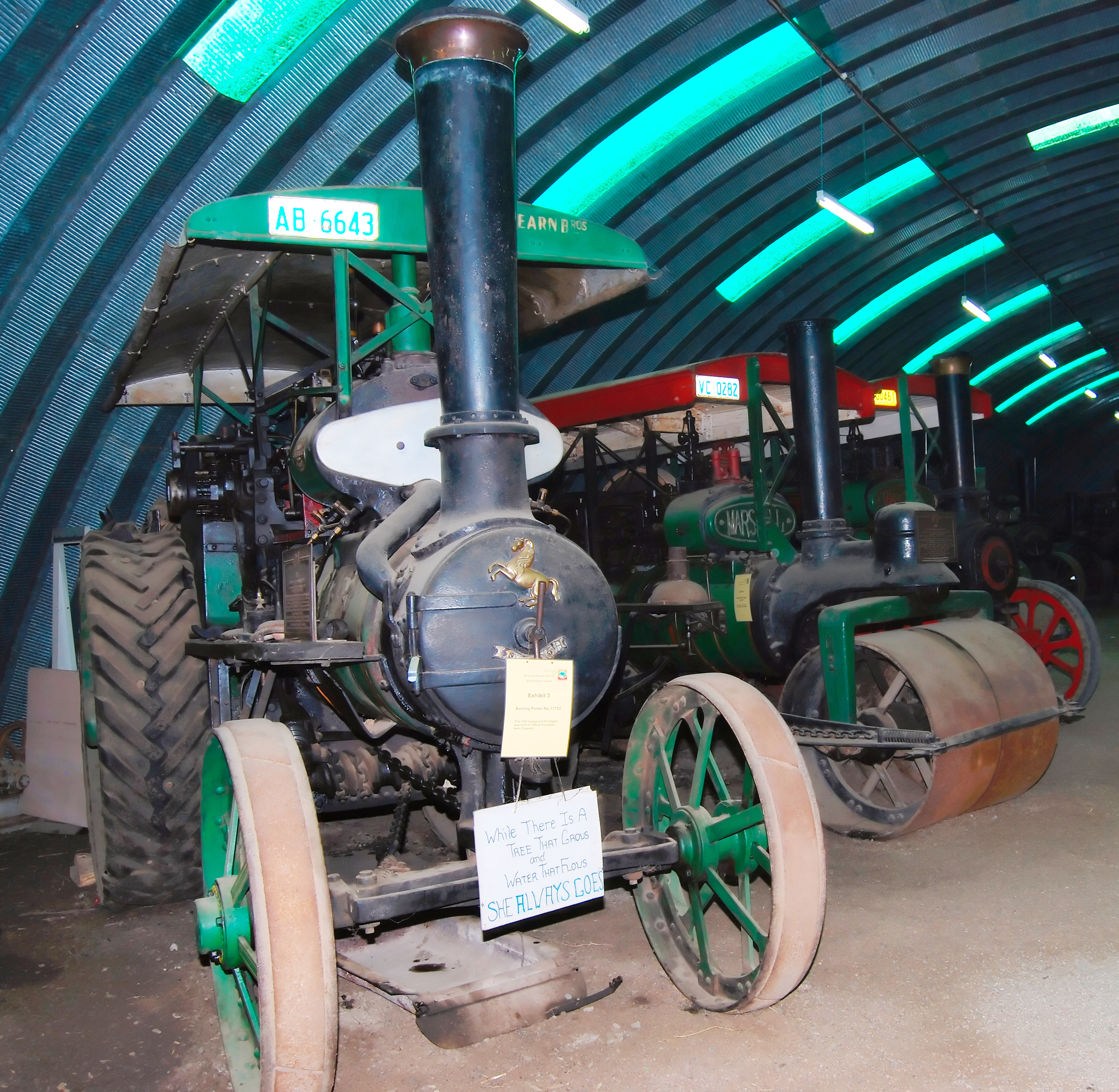
Part of Pearn's Steam World

- Pearn's Steam World, a collection of over 200 historic items
- Westbury Maze and Tea Rooms
- The White House
- The Westbury Village Green
- The Giant Cricket Stumps erected as a welcome gate to the cricket club
