= Carrick, Tasmania =

Carrick
- Town
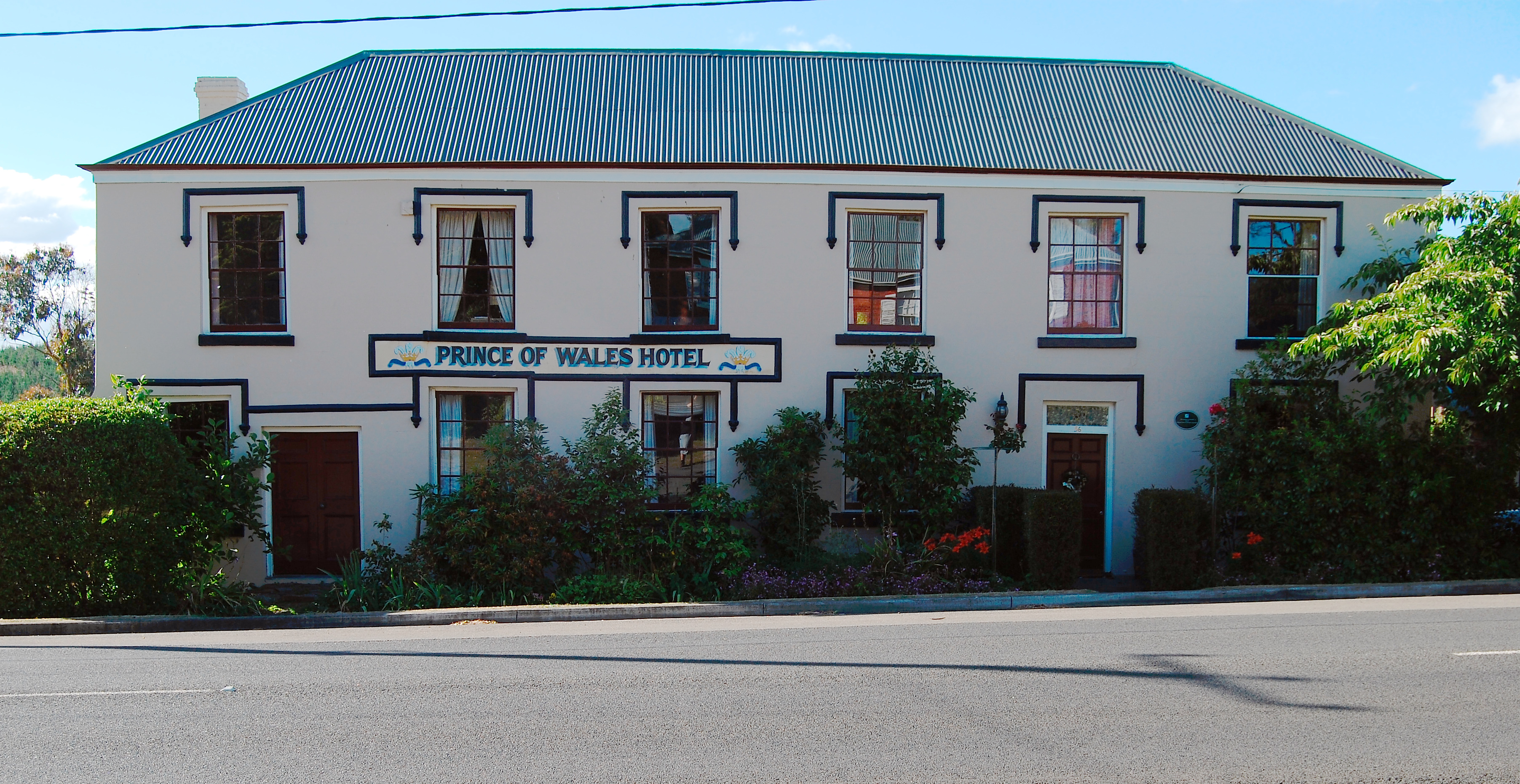
- Carrick's former Prince of Wales Hotel

- Coordinates: 41°32′0″S 147°0′0″E
- Country: Australia
- State: Tasmania
- LGA: Meander Valley Council
- Location: 198 km (123 mi) N of Hobart; 20 km (12 mi) SW of Launceston; 6 km (3.7 mi) SW of Hadspen

Government
  - State electorate: Lyons
  - Federal division: Lyons
- Elevation: 79 m (259 ft)

Population
  - Total: 432 (2016 census)
- Postcode: 7291
- Mean max temp: 16.9 °C (62.4 °F)
- Mean min temp: 4.6 °C (40.3 °F)
- Annual rainfall: 711 mm (28.0 in)

Carrick is a small historic village 17 kilometres (11 mi) west of Launceston, Tasmania, Australia, on the banks of the Liffey River. The Meander Valley Highway passes through the town's centre; this road was formerly the main road from Launceston to Deloraine and Devonport. Carrick has a well-preserved 19th-century heritage; fifteen of its colonial buildings are listed on the Tasmanian Heritage Register including Carrick House (1840), St Andrew's Church (1848), the Old Watch house (1837), Monds Roller Mill (1846) and the Carrick Hotel (1833).

The first land grant at Carrick was in 1818 and a decade later John Schnierer was building a wooden mill on the river's bank. The town was formed in consequence of this mill's construction and town plots sold in 1838. Carrick Post Office opened on 5 November 1841. Carrick never grew large—the population varied from around 200 to 439—and today it is largely a residential settlement for those who work in Launceston and the rural areas surrounding the town. During much of its history growth has been limited by lack of organised water supply and sewerage, though reticulated services for both are now connected. Volunteer labour enabled piped water supply, from the Liffey, from 1961 and a sewerage plant was built in the mid-1970s on the towns outskirts. The local councils' strategic plan aims for the town to stay small with only infill development.

The 1846 stone building known as "Monds Roller Mill" is the town's most prominent feature. The operation of this mill—and the preceding wooden mill—was the foundation of the town's prosperity during the 19th century. The mill operated until 1924, for most of this time by Thomas Monds and his family company, and was the last water powered flour mill in Tasmania. Since a 1984 renovation it has intermittently been a restaurant, wedding venue and meeting venue. Near the mill is Archer's Folly, an imposing and now ruined, but never completed, grand colonial house. The folly was started in 1847, sold incomplete in 1867 and burned to a roofless shell in 1978. Significant people associated with Carrick include: Thomas Reibey, once Premier of Tasmania; Thomas Monds who founded an extensive milling company; and Sammy Cox whose claims would make him the earliest European settler in Tasmania.

The Anglican Church St Andrews has held services since the 1840s. For some time the town also had a Wesleyan Chapel. A private school opened in 1843 and a government one in the 1870s. By the late 1930s both schools had closed. Carrick hosts Agfest, the state's largest single event and one of Australia's largest agricultural field days. The 1848 Anglican church, 1833 hotel and a few other establishments serve the townspeople. A brewery, steam and water mill, butcher, schools and other hotels are all long since closed. Carrick has a long association with horse racing, starting prior to the race course's formation in 1848. For a time the town held the oldest horse race in Australia. Today regular harness racing, speedway racing and cycling events have replaced this.

== History ==
=== Prior to foundation ===
Carrick's area is within the traditional grounds of the Northern Midlands group of Tasmanian Aborigines. Records held by Aboriginal Heritage Tasmania have no reference, as recently as 2010, of any Aboriginal heritage or artifacts in the area. The first land grant at Carrick was made in 1818 to Thomas Haydock Reibey, father of Thomas Reibey (later Premier of Tasmania). The grant was for 4,000 acres (1,600 ha) taking in the area of the later town. Early land use was for agriculture and by 1823, at least, there were only a few widely scattered settlers.

Captain William Thomas Lyttleton was granted over 1,300 acres (530 ha) near Carrick in late 1825 when he lived at nearby Hagley in Hagley House. What was then just a locality became known as Lyttleton after the Captain. The river that passed from the Great Western Tiers to nearby Meander River was then known as The Pennyroyal Creek, after a plant that grew profusely on its banks. William Bryan arrived at Hobart, from Ireland, in May 1824. He received land grants of 1,077 acres (436 ha) in the Meander Valley and later purchased 500 acres (200 ha) at Carrick, including 30 acres (10 ha) on the creek. Bryan began building a mill on his Carrick grant in 1826, on the same site as the later Monds Roller Mills. His business interests prospered and he purchased large amounts of land, including more at Carrick. By 1828 the first bridge over the river had been built, a simple log structure. Bryan's mill was the impetus for foundation of the town. Van Diemen's Land's Land Commissioners recommended in early 1828: "Mr W Bryan is building a mill a short way up the stream and we beg to recommend reserving 100 acres each side for the various purposes of a village which we called Lyttleton."

Over the next few years Bryan used his influence to rename, in memory of his homeland, both the town and the river, much to the disgust of Lyttleton. It was reported in 1831 newspapers that the road from Launceston to Carrick had been opened. The path of the road was announced in April 1831, and it was opened for public traffic in June. The State Government sold town allotments in late 1838, obtaining what was noted as a high price of £45 (A$8,100 in 2005) (Note: Currency converted using relative rate of 74.245 between January 1838 and 2005 for the Pound sterling from: "Inflation: the value of the pound 1750–2005" (PDF). House of Commons Library. 2005. Archived from the original (PDF) on 26 March 2009. Converted to Australian Dollars at 1:0.4112 from Australian Reserve Bank published spot rates) per acre.

=== 19th century ===
Samuel Pratt Winter was sent to Tasmania by his father, at Bryan's request, to act as an overseer of the mill. He managed the mill from 1834, when Bryan went to London in the midst of a dispute with Governor Arthur, and leased it from 1837 onwards. After a dispute with the lessee Donald McLean in 1841, the mill was operated by Richard Warren from April 1841, he also occupied the mill cottage according to the 1842 census. A post office opened in November 1841, and at the end of the year the village had also four dwellings, a blacksmith shop, a police station, the flour mill and an adobe hotel built by John Archer. While passing through the town Louisa Anne Meredith took note of the buildings. In her guidebook, published in 1843, she referred to the "crazy weather board mill". At the time the mill's motive power came from an overshot water wheel supplied with water from the Liffey River via a long wooden trough. St Andrew's church was built in 1843 by Thomas Reibey as a school. The initial church grounds of 14 acres (6 ha) were donated by Thomas Reibey. Winter was living at the mill cottage in 1846, when he arranged for the old wooden mill to be removed and, with John Kinder Archer, began building the blue-stone mill. The town greatly expanded in the late 1850s, fuelled by the efforts of those returning from the Victorian gold fields. Over time many cottages in Carrick were built for workers on the Reibey's Entally House outside nearby Hadspen.

By 1859 the town had two mills—one steam and one water wheel powered—that processed approximately 4000 bushels per week. There was a steam-powered brewery, opposite St Andrew's church, whose produce won first prize at the 1859 Launceston show (by 1947 the brewery was scant ruins). During its operation the brewery had supplied all of the town's hotels. Four inns were open and the town had an agricultural machinery manufacturing business. A public library was established in 1860. The mill was sold to Thomas Monds, an experienced miller, in 1867. At the time it was reported that its machinery was in poor repair, but the building was sound. When a nearby rail line was built in 1869 traffic through Carrick greatly diminished and trade in the town suffered, though the nearest station was Bishopbourne over 5 miles (8 km) away.

A government school was established in the 1870s and grew to 65 students by 1901. Mond's business expanded throughout the latter part of the 19th century and the prosperity of the town did likewise. He built a large grain store opposite the mill and opened offices and a depot in Launceston. Westbury Municipal Council built a public hall on the main road in 1883. The current weatherboard town hall dates from c. 1900 and the old hall is presumed to have been destroyed prior to this. At the town's height in the 19th century, just after the return of men from the Victorian gold fields, the town had four public houses and a population of approximately 400. It had four public houses operating two of which, Prince of Wales and the Carrick Hotel, remained open in 1901. As of 1883 it was reported that the inns were kept open by the Carrick Races and fortnightly livestock sales. Carrick's livestock sales were held at the Carrick Hotel and were the main fat stock sales for Launceston. At the turn of the century the town had no reticulated water. It relied on wells, rainwater and the inconstant river.

=== Transportation ===
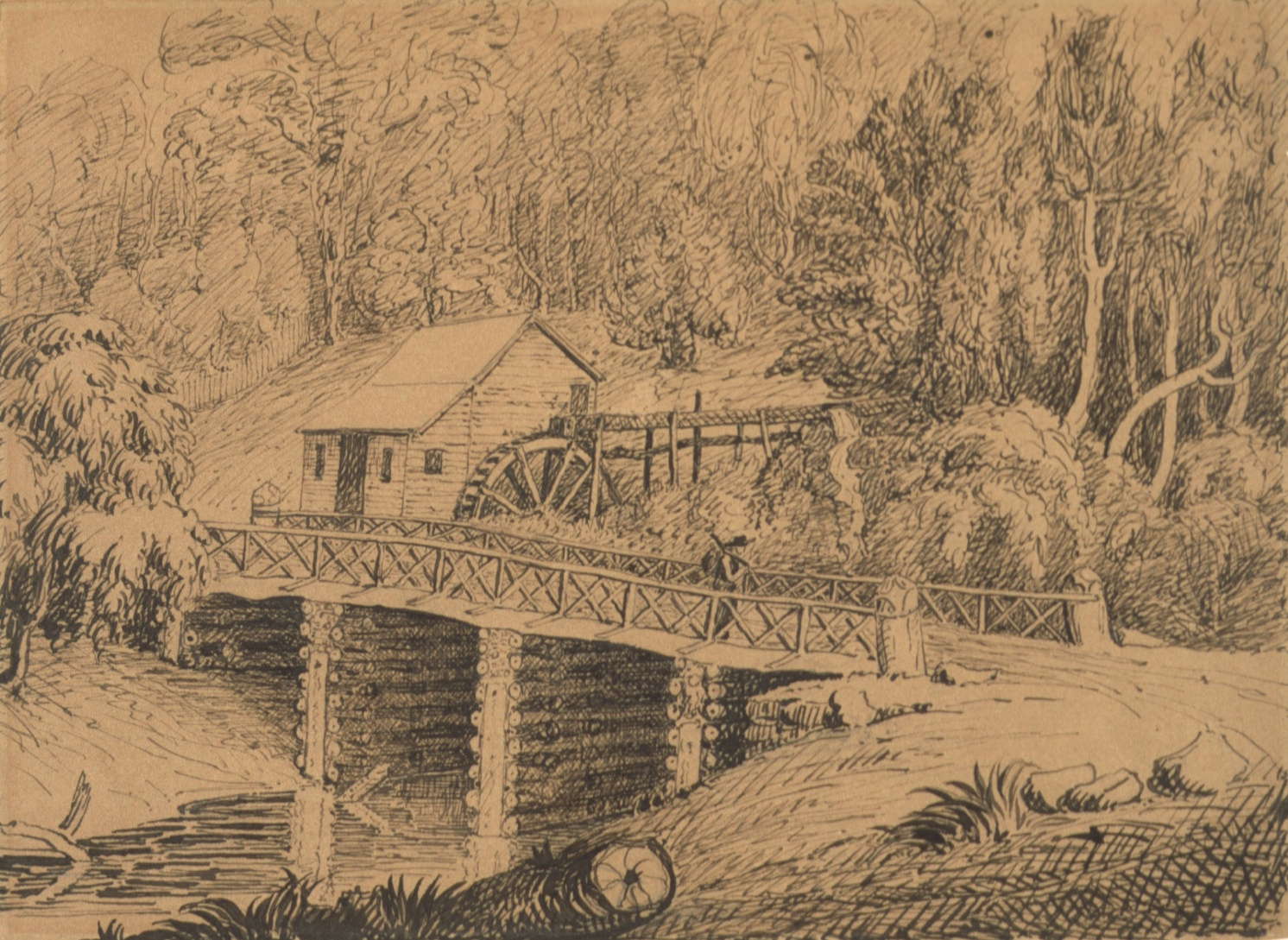
C. 1850 drawing of Bryan's mill and an early bridge over the Liffey by Elizabeth Hudspeth

The Liffey River—then called Pennyroyal Creek—was first bridged at Carrick in 1828 with a simple log structure. This was replaced in the 1830s with a more substantial bridge, though still wooden. As of 1834 the areas' roads were poor and vehicles frequently became bogged on the road to Westbury. A bridge over the South Esk, at what is now Hadspen, was built in 1843. It replaced a frequently impassable ford and more reliably connected Carrick to Launceston. Liffey bridge was repaired and raised in the mid-1860s, keeping the original foundations. In May 1875 water sufficiently eroded these foundations to lead to the bridge's collapse, when one of the two supporting piles (logs) gave way. All of the Liffey bridges, and the connecting parts of the road, were subject to inundation when the river flooded; the 1929 Tasmanian Floods carried the bridge away. In the 1950s the road was reconstructed and the bridge again replaced. To reduce the incidence and impact of flooding both were raised substantially leaving the mill's ground floor far below the road level.

A rail line was built nearby in 1869. With the advent of rail, traffic through Carrick was greatly diminished and trade in the town suffered. A rail siding was built at "The Oaks", over 1 mile (1.6 km) from the town's edge and a station at Bishopbourne over 5 miles (8 km) away. The passenger rail service had ceased before 1978, a time when all Tasmanian passenger rail services ceased.

By 1877 there was a twice daily mail and passenger cart connecting Carrick to the railway station at Bishopbourne and "Blair's Bus" ran thrice weekly to Launceston. The Bass Highway, which passed through Carrick, had been designated a National Highway as part of the Federal National Highway Act 1974. The structure of this type of road required that the centre of Carrick be bypassed. The road through Carrick is now known as the Meander Valley Highway. Bass Highway, which connects Launceston, Burnie and Devonport, passes south of the town. As of 2011 Redline Coaches, runs a daily school bus service that passes through Carrick to many of the Schools in and around Launceston and regular services connecting Carrick to Burnie, Launceston, Hobart and towns in between.

== Sports ==
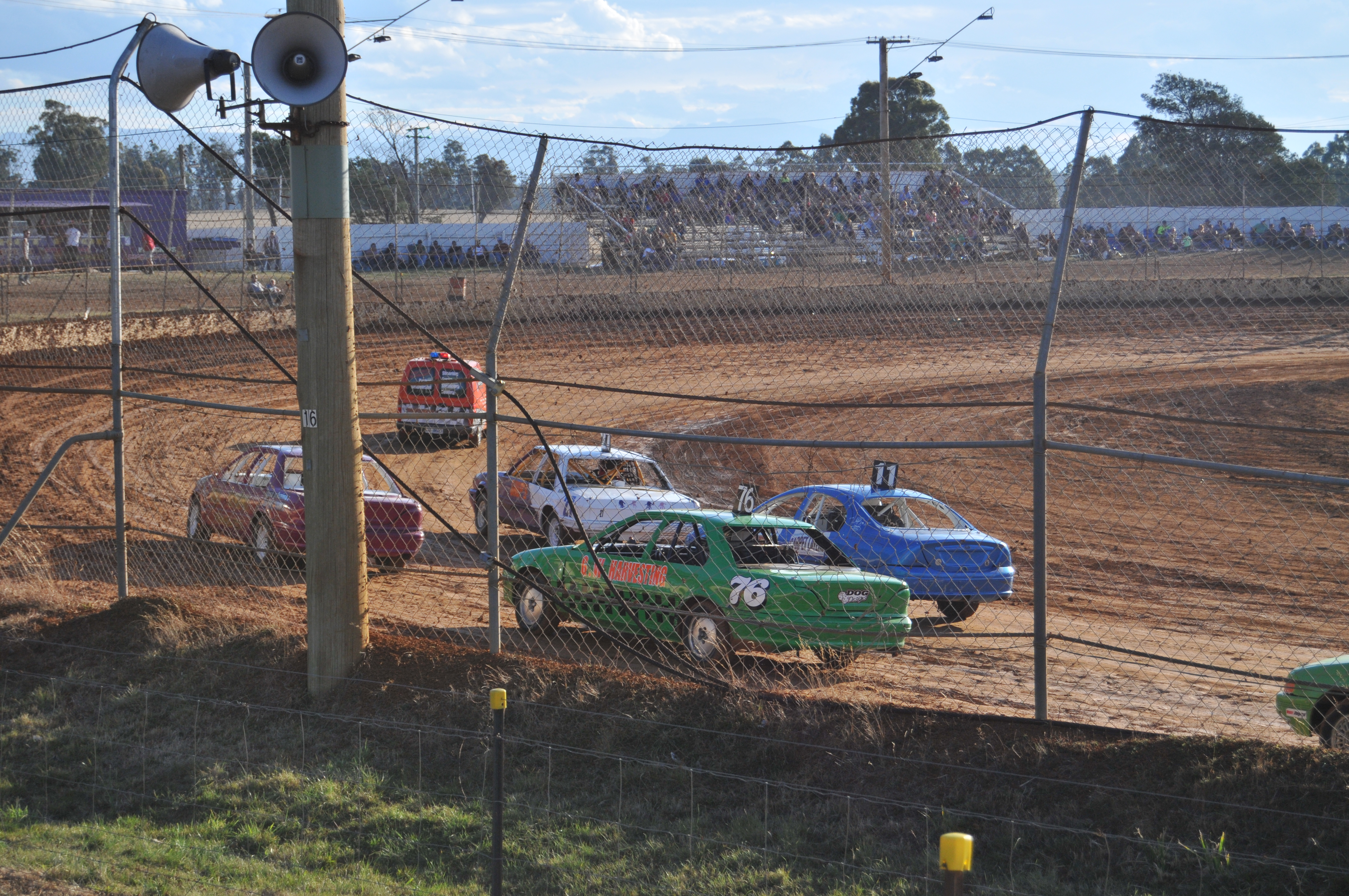
Stock car racing at the Carrick Speedway, March 2011

Carrick has long been associated with horse racing. The Reverend Thomas Reibey and the Fields Family were instrumental in founding both a racing club and racecourse. Racing first begun on "The Moat", a property on the east edge of Carrick. Reibey gifted a racecourse somewhat south of "The Moat"; the course was originally 1 mile, 57 links long. The Carrick Racing Club was formed in 1848 and the course was well regarded; it was called "the best in Tasmania" by author Hugh Munro Hull in 1859. The Carrick Plate—a name now used for a race held in Launceston—was held at the new racecourse, without interruption, annually from 1849 to 1913; this made it the oldest race in Australia.

The track's use changed from racing to trotting at this time. The Carrick Trotting club was formed in early 1914 and had its first meeting in February of the same year. The Carrick Trotting Club and Westbury Trotting Club combined in 1976 to form the Carrick Park Trotting Club, later to renamed Carrick Park Pacing Club. As of 2012 Carrick has a 1013m trotting track hosting 3 race meetings a year and up to 27 trial sessions. Next to the trotting track, on grounds owned by the club, is a speedway. Construction of the speedway began in 1967 and the first races were in September 1968. The track has been in use since opening and crowds of over 10,000 have been reported.

The town is frequent host to cycling events that are recorded as far back as 1897, and continue to the present day. (Note: There are numerous mentions of races in Carrick including: *"Cycling; Carrick Road Race". Examiner. Launceston. 6 November 1913. p. 2. *Padgett, Louise (12 April 2012). "Tasmanians going global". The Examiner.) The Liffey is fished for brown trout (Salmo trutta) during the August to April fishing season. Trout were released into the Liffey River by the fisheries commission in 1940, and by 1949 specimens of up to 11 pounds (5 kg) had been caught in the river's upper reaches.

== Water and sewerage ==
Organised water supply in the town began at least by 1883 when it was reported being carted from the millrace. The river's water was used as wells in the town were deemed too brackish. Five years later Thomas Monds installed hydraulic rams and began pumping water from the river to three iron tanks in the town. He on-sold the water to townspeople, though the mill had priority over river water; this was a particular problem during droughts when the Liffey slowed to a trickle. Westbury Council—local government of the time—called for tenders for Carrick's water supply in 1889. This water supply system was completed in 1890. Water was again pumped from the river near the mill, again by hydraulic rams, to a tank near the centre of the town which supplied another tank on the main road and some houses on the same road. Both tanks had troughs and hoses for public use.

A typhoid outbreak in the early 20th century was blamed on the water supplied from these tanks. Subsequent to this the pumps were shut down and the town again relied on rainwater tanks, wells and water carted from the river. The Westbury council's "Carrick Water Supply" was not self-funding and was abandoned in 1928. The mill's dam was washed away in the 1929 floods and has not been rebuilt, losing the town its water storage.

In 1961 a residents progress association was formed. A prime goal was the building of a reservoir—supplied from the river—on Armidale hill overlooking the town. To defray costs and gain council acceptance, a large part of the work was performed by volunteers. This scheme began supplying the town on 17 February 1961. Up to the 1970s, Carrick's growth was limited by the lack of town sewerage—which restricted the minimum allotment size—and reluctance of landowner's to subdivide property. A 1977 planning study found that the land structure allowed most of the town to be served by a gravity fed system and recommended construction. As of 2008 the majority of the town was connected to reticulated water and sewerage. (Note: The connection of the town to sewerage has been reported in government publications; see "Archived copy" (PDF). Archived from the original (PDF) on 16 March 2012.)

From the mid-1970s sewerage was processed at a plant near the town, which also handles sewerage from nearby Hadspen. Treated waste-water from there is discharged into a tributary of the Liffey River. As of 2003 the reticulated water supply in the town was untreated and both were operated by the Meander Valley council. By 2011 Carrick's water was supplied from the Mount Leslie Water Treatment Plant. This plant was built in 1996 and supplies treated water from the Trevallyn Dam.

== Education ==
Thomas Monds was instrumental in formation of the first school. This private school was built in 1843, though Thomas Reibey converted it into St Andrews church in 1845, and the school moved elsewhere in the town. A Government school was built in 1873, next to the current recreation ground, and both schools were open as of 1883. The private school closed late in the 19th century, but the Government school still had 65 students on the 1901 roll. The latter was a weatherboard building. It was extensively renovated in 1920 and was in use until the mid-1930s when the last school in Carrick closed. The building was relocated to nearby Hagley in 1938, though it was later demolished. In the same year the government began funding regular school transport from Carrick to the school at nearby Hagley, accompanying children from Hadspen whose school had also been closed. Since that time there has been no school in Carrick and a 1976 planning report stated the population was likely to remain insufficient to require one.

== Flora and fauna ==
Since European settlement the area has been subdivided, settled and farmed. A traveller in 1855 noted that the area was highly cultivated. The endangered growling grass frog (Litoria raniformis) has been sighted, though there is only a single record. In some undisturbed areas there is Poa labillardierei (silver tussock) grassland and Themeda triandra (kangaroo grass). Glycine latrobeana (clover glycine) was recorded south of the town in 1984. Discaria pubescens (Hairy Anchor Plant or Australian Anchor Plant), which appears on the states endangered species list, was recorded north-east in 2001 on the South Esk River's floodplain. Apart from introduced brown trout the Liffey River is home to platypus (Ornithorhynchus anatinus). Platypus in the river have, in common with in other rivers nearby, been found with the potentially lethal fungal infection Mucor amphibiorum.

== Religion ==
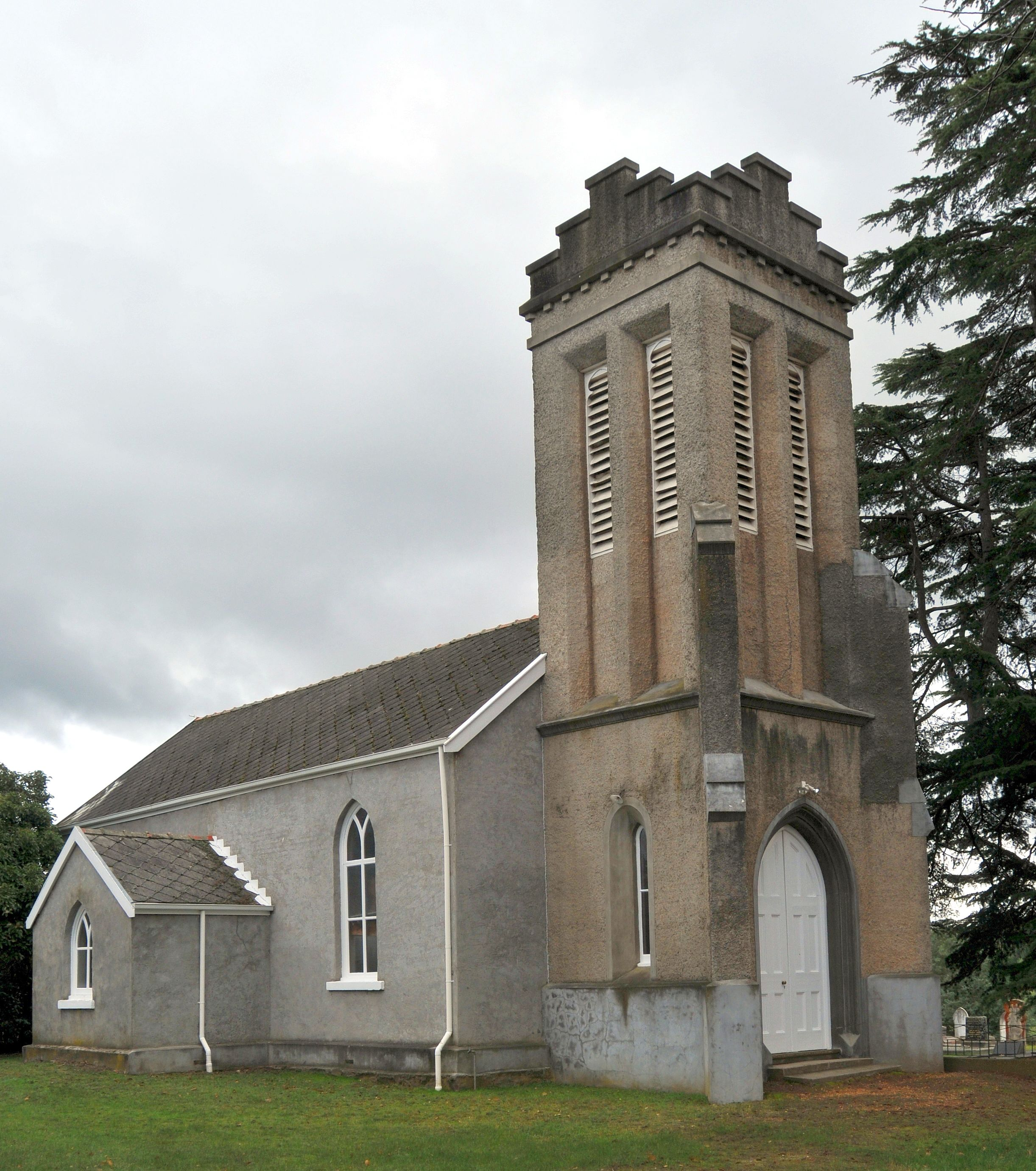
St Andrew's Church in 2010

Carrick has one extant church, St Andrew's, an Anglican church in the parish of Quamby. Until 1992 it was in the former Anglican Parish of Carrick. Church of England—now known as the Anglican Church of Australia—services were first held c. 1843 in a blacksmith's shop and subsequently in a schoolhouse, whose building was later transformed into St Andrew's. Thomas Reibey had the schoolhouse converted by 1845, though the tower was a later addition. The church's burial ground was consecrated in April 1845, and the church itself, by Tasmania's first Church of England Bishop Francis Russell Nixon, on 25 November 1845. Though not yet ordained, Reibey received dispensation to begin holding services, first in the blacksmith's shop, prior to his ordination. He was later the first clergyman ordained by Bishop Nixon and was made an archdeacon in 1857. Thomas Reibey was the first minister of St Andrew's, and was succeeded by his brother James, for whom the church's rectory was built.

A Wesleyan chapel was built in 1865; a small weatherboard building with an attached Sunday School. The Church eventually fell out of use and became a private home. It was demolished during the 1930s. There has not been a Roman Catholic church in Carrick—the nearest church is Westbury—but some Catholics are recorded as attending the Anglican Church.

== Geography ==
The town is 17 kilometres (11 mi) from Launceston on the Meander valley Highway (B54) between the towns of Hadspen and Hagley. The Liffey river crosses the town's western end, after flowing from the Great Western Tiers, over the Liffey falls, through Bracknell and Bishopbourne. Shortly after passing through the town the river joins the Meander River.

== Demographics and people ==
Carrick's population has never been large. There were 430 residents in 1836 and near to 400 for most of the rest of the 19th century. By late 1976 the population had shrunk to around 200 living in 70 buildings—of which sixteen were classified as "Significantly contributing to the heritage of Australia" by the National Trust. A recovery in the late 20th century saw 317 residents recorded in the 2001 census and 439 in the 2006 census. Carrick's role in 1976 was as: a residential area for those working in Launceston; a retirement village; and a service centre for farming and stock breeding enterprises. The population in 2006 was largely Australian-born (87% compared to an average for all of Australia of 70.9%) and English-speaking at home (92.7% compared to an Australian average of 78.5%).

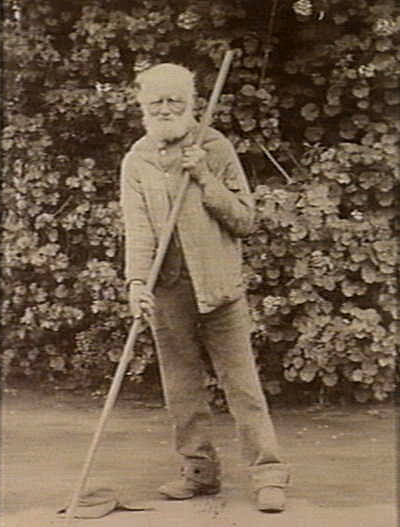
Sammy Cox in 1890

Sammy Cox (aka Samuel Emanuel Jervis) (c. 1773–1891) is a significant former resident. He claimed to have been born Samuel Emanuel Jervis, 15 November 1773 in Wales, or Lichfield, England, and spent time on his uncle's ship, the Regent Fox, after his father died, then jumped ship in 1789 near Tamar heads and subsequently lived with the local Aboriginals for twenty-six years. This would have him resident in Tasmania years before the first recorded settlement, in 1803 on the Derwent River, and before even the existence of Bass Strait was proved by George Bass and Matthew Flinders. In 1814 he met and was befriended by the Cox family, residents near Hadspen, and took the family's surname. He ended up working as a gardener and spent about 50 years living in a cottage on the "Little Moat" property on the Launceston side of Carrick. Cox died in the Launceston invalid depot, 5 June 1891 claiming to be 117 years old, though 115 is a more credible figure (von Stieglitz in 1946 credited his age as 118). His story has been widely reported; the dining room of the Carrick Hotel is named after him on the basis of it. It has been called into doubt, though, with historian Dr Andrew Piper describing the story as a tall tale constructed by Cox. While writing about Cox, Thomas Monds, who had befriended and assisted him, also expressed doubt as to the story's veracity.

Thomas Reibey has been written of as the Father of Carrick. Reibey was instrumental in construction of the Church, the racecourse and other, now heritage listed, buildings in the town. He donated over 10,000 pounds for the construction of the town's Anglican church, a very large sum for the time, and was appointed as the Archdeacon of Launceston in 1858. Reibey was elected to the House of Assembly seat of Westbury in 1874. He held the seat for 30 years and was the Premier of Tasmania from 20 July 1876 until 9 August 1877. Reibey was an avid horse trainer. His horse "Stockwell" won the 1882 Launceston Cup, the Carrick Plate in 1881 and came second in the Melbourne Cup.

Thomas Wilkes Monds was a successful miller and builder before moving to Carrick. He bought the stone mill in Carrick in 1867 and a steam mill in the town the following year. The successful operation of the mills by Monds brought wealth to him and prosperity to the town. Monds built the Gothic house "Hawthorn" in 1875 and worked the nearby 1,200 acres (490 ha) farm called "Hattondale", as well as the mills. Before he left Carrick for Launceston in 1888 his holdings in Carrick included the mill, the steam mill, Archer's Folly and some houses and acreages within the town and "Hattondale". Monds was chairman and treasurer of the Carrick Road Trust from 1870 to 1904 and spent nine years on the area's local council.

== Today's town ==

Carrick is a small historic village that is primarily a residential settlement for those who work in Launceston and the rural areas surrounding the town. Development has been slow and has not changed the town's original 19th century character. The local council's development plan aims to restrict development along Meander Valley road and prevent the merging of Carrick and Hadspen, keeping them as distinct centres. Construction is only planned within the town's boundary, where up to sixty homes could potentially be built under the strategic plan that runs until 2016. The town's development boundary is dictated by the span of sewerage connection. There are few businesses in the town and little incentive for business growth due to the town's small population. The town is in the Meander Valley Council local government area, the Federal Division of Lyons, and the State Division of Lyons.

Carrick has a roadhouse, a post office, a hotel, a copper and metal gallery and some accommodation. After Thomas Monds merged his business into Monds and Affleck, the company built a milling operation on Oaks Road, just south of the now re-aligned Bass Highway. As of 2010 the mill owner claimed it is "Tasmania's only large-scale commercial feed milling operation". The town plays host to a number of events including the Agfest field days, trotting races, speedway racing and cycling events. Next door to the ruins of Archer's Folly is the Tasmanian Copper and Metal Art Gallery. From here the Marik family makes, displays and sells handcrafted copper artworks. The lack of development over time has left the town with a significant number of colonial buildings and mature trees. The 1846 stone "Monds Roller Mill" is the town's most prominent feature. It was closed but being renovated as of 2008. Other heritage listed buildings are the ruin of Archer's Folly (begun 1847), St Andrews Church (1845), Balmoral (1851), The Old Watchhouse (1837), the Carrick Hotel (1833).

=== Agfest ===
Agfest is an annual agricultural field day, held each May on a rural property in Carrick. It is the state's, and one of the country's, largest agricultural field days. Agfest is run by the Rural Youth Organisation of Tasmania with profits assisting Tasmanian Rural Counselling. It was first held at Symmons Plains, near Perth, Tasmania, in 1982 but the organising committee soon recognised the need for a larger site and in 1986 they purchased land on Oaks Road, Carrick from the Peterson family. This piece of land had originally been part of "Oaks Estate" belonging to Thomas Haydock Reibey, father to once Premier of Tasmania Thomas Reibey. They named it "Quercus Rural Youth Park"—Quercus is the genus name for oak—and held the first Agfest on the new site from 7–9 May 1987. Agfest has grown to the state's largest single event and attracts up to 70,000 visitors during the three days in May each year at the 200-acre (80 ha) site.

== Heritage properties ==
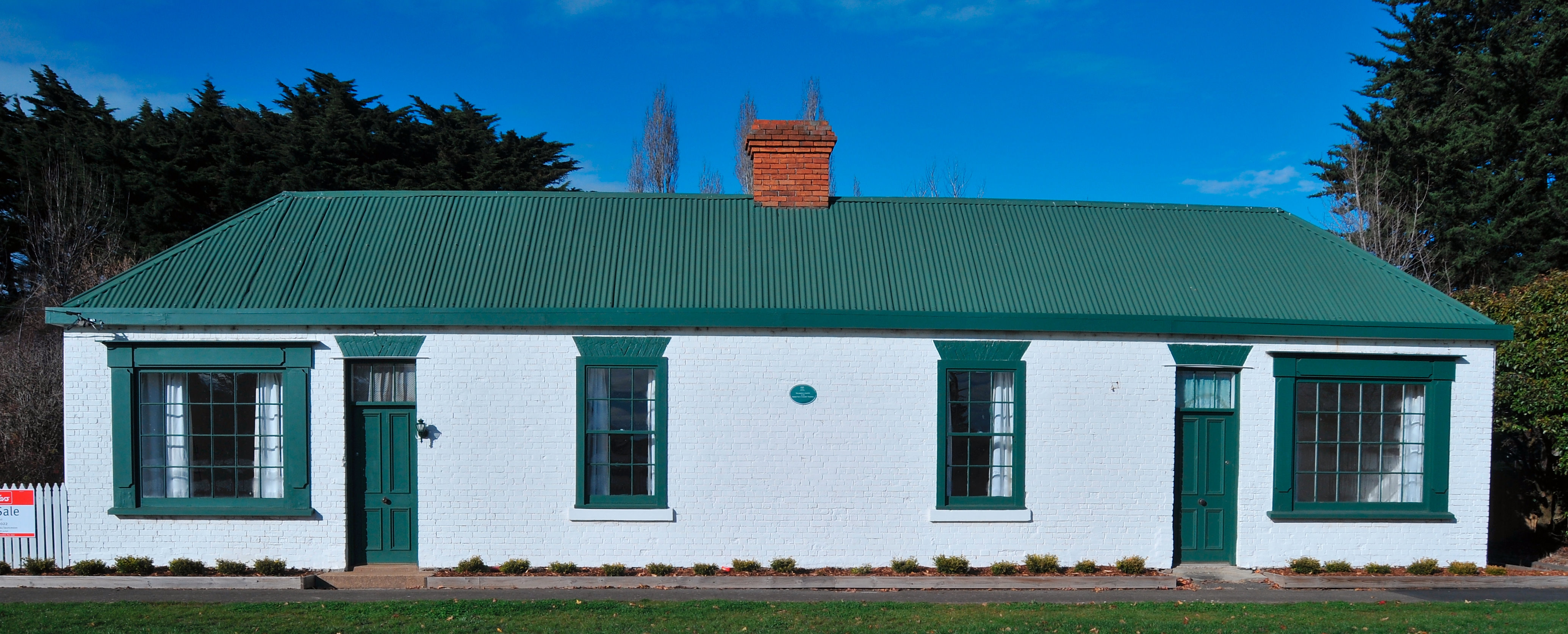
Pensioner's row co-joined cottages

Carrick has a large number of well-preserved 19th-century buildings. Fifteen properties in and around Carrick are listed on the Tasmanian Heritage Register. The listings recognised their historic cultural heritage significance to all Tasmania. Some of the properties are also listed on the Register of the National Estate.

Pensioner's Row is a pair of co-joined brick cottages built by Thomas Reibey, originally for the blacksmith and saddler for "Entally Estate" in Hadspen. A heritage-listed cottage close by on Meander Valley road was formerly called "Ivy Cottage" due to prolific growth of the plant and was used as a private school. The former police watch-house was built opposite the Carrick Inn in 1837 using convict labour. The Prince of Wales Hotel was built in 1840 and was licensed for many years, but is now a private home. By 1869 it was a two-storey brick building with sixteen rooms, a cellar and a separate stone stable. "Sillwood" is the remains of an original farm building, built on a grant that was 4,560 acres (1,845 ha) in 1835. The original home was partly demolished to make way for an extension to an adjacent building in the late 20th century. The main farmhouse, said to be an "Outstanding Indian-influence house", has been demolished. Carrick House, on East Street was built around 1840 by Roderic O'Conner and was extended in the 19th century. Until the 1980s the house was associated with horse racing; its stables were used as a training base. It is a two-storey brick house with an iron roof and twelve-pane windows. Behind the stone mill is a single-storey brick cottage that was built around 1840 as a four-roomed, single-story brick building. After he purchased the mill, Monds expanded the cottage with a pantry, three more rooms and a dairy.

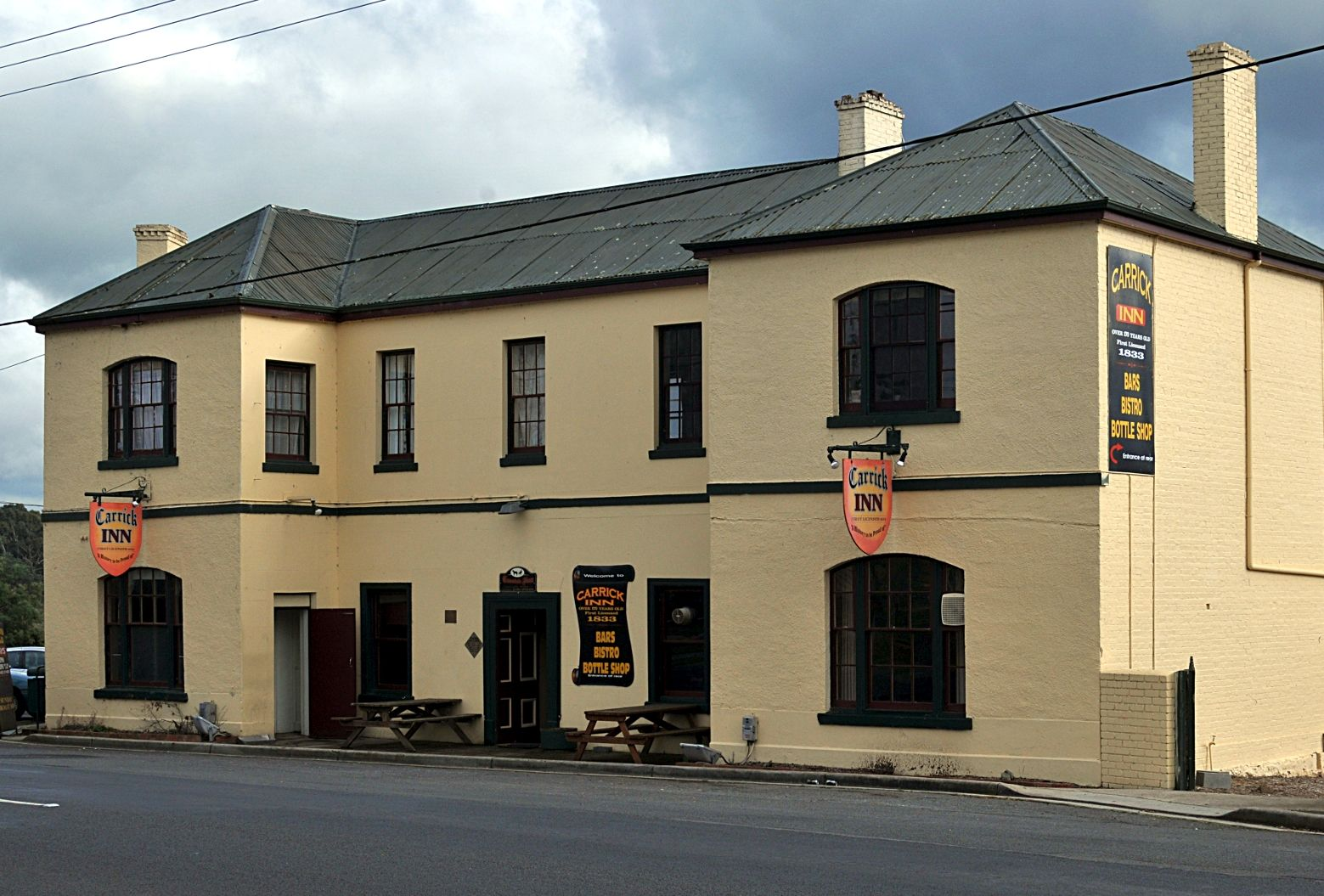
Carrick's 1833 Hotel

The Carrick Hotel is a two-storey brick building with an iron hip roof built in 1833. It is the only licensed premises in Carrick and has been operated as a hotel for the entire of its history. The hotel has been sold and the licence transferred numerous times, including the first instance from John Taylor to Thomas Archer on 12 August 1839, and was called the Hotel Marella from November 1945 to December 1952. (Note: The Carrick Hotel's name was changed to the Hotel Marella in November 1945 "Notes". The Examiner. Launceston. 22 November 1945. p. 2. and back to the Carrick Hotel in December 1952. "Police Objection to Licence". The Examiner. Launceston. 10 December 1952. p. 6.)John Rudge built the Plough Inn in 1841, though it was referred to in an 1842 survey map as the Carrick Inn. It is a two-story brick building with an iron roof and 12-panel windows. John Archer was the Inn's first licensee, but by 1863 it was no longer operating and the building was offered for lease. The last licensee was John Jordan in 1873; over time it has been used as a bakery, art gallery, hotel and private home.

=== Monds Roller Mills ===
Monds Roller Mills building is a four-level, three-story, bluestone building with an iron gabled roof built c. 1846 by John Kinder Archer. The mill, and its associated storage and transportation needs, was the main employer in Carrick for many years. It was the last mill in Tasmania to be powered by water.

The first mill was built of timber and powered by a water wheel fed from a dam on the Liffey, all constructed by William Bryan in 1826. Samuel Pratt Winter was sent to Tasmania by his father, at Byran's request, as an overseer for the mill. He managed this mill from 1834, when Bryan went to London in the midst of a dispute with Governor Arthur. From 1837 he leased the mill from Bryan and continued to operate it. He was living at the mill cottage in 1846, and still leasing the mill, when he arranged for the old wooden mill to be removed and, with John Kinder Archer, began building the current stone structure. As built this new mill had a water wheel powering three pairs of French burrs. Thomas Wilkes Monds was born in Launceston in 1829 and spent his early life gaining experience in numerous milling operations. In early 1841, on Monds' first visit to the town, he recorded it as having only four houses, a wooden flour mill, a blacksmith's shop and a pub constructed of mud and straw. Thomas Monds purchased the mill, including 13 acres (5 ha) of attached land, at Auction in 1867 for 2,100 pounds. He then took ownership of the "Carrick Mills" and in early 1868 Monds, his wife and six children moved into the small cottage behind the mill. This cottage had four rooms that Monds later expanded with a pantry, three more rooms and a dairy. When he purchased it, and for some time afterwards, the mill was not financially successful. Monds blamed this state of affairs on the "speculative" operation of a steam-powered mill, just a short distance uphill. The steam mill owners eventually became insolvent and Monds acquired the operation and building.

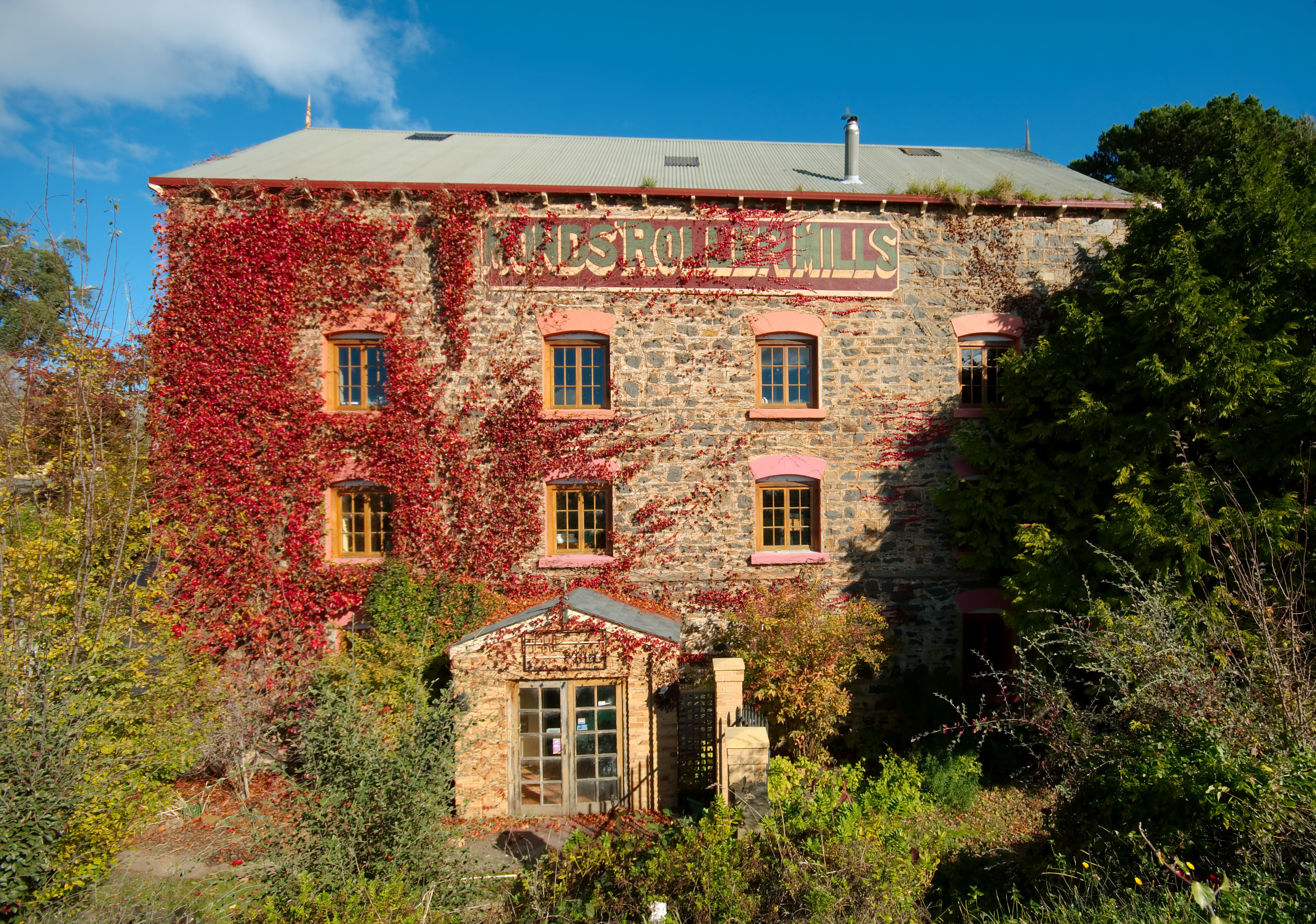
Monds Roller Mill in 2012

Over time the mill's machinery was updated: in 1868 the existing wire machine was replaced with a silk dressing machine; a corn screen was installed in 1871; an oatmeal plant was added in 1880; the water wheel was replaced with an American-built water-powered "Victor" turbine in 1887; and in 1889 the plant was converted from millstones to roller milling, making it one of the earliest conversions in Tasmania. This last change, to roller milling, was recorded by Monds as driven by public demand for the whiter flour that process produced. Monds' oldest son took over office management of the mill in 1882 and Monds moved to Launceston in 1888 leaving the mill's management to his sons. The mill was the scene of the town's first telephones when they were installed at it and adjacent Hawthorn Villa in 1893. (Note: Installation of the first telephones was recorded in Stevenson, p.12, who was reporting on an article in The Launceston Examiner, 5 October 1893)

The mill remained in the hands of TW Monds & Sons until their 1918 merger with T Affleck & Son—which owned the Newry mill at Longford—creating the company Monds & Affleck. Monds & Affleck only operated the mill until 1924, and never reopened it. By 1931 it was reported as having ceased operations years ago. Monds & Affleck sold the mill in 1947, though it is not known when the mill's machinery was removed. By this time the mill was descending into Ruin and had long been vacant. The mill was renovated in 1984 and opened as a restaurant, though four years later it had closed and was being sold. After this it was reopened as a wedding and meeting venue. It had closed again by 2008, but was being renovated with the intention of reopening.

=== St. Andrew's Church ===
St. Andrew's Church is an actively used Anglican Church. The building is made from stuccoed brick with a crenelated tower and sits on 14 acres (6 ha)—that includes a cemetery and a rectory—abutting the Liffey River. The building was begun in 1843 by Thomas Reibey as a school for the town. He had the building converted to a church in 1845; Reibey donated the church's land and funded the building of the rectory and later purchase of the church's organ. The cemetery was consecrated in April 1845 and the church itself in November of the same year. The current structure was not complete until the tower was added in 1863. St. Andrew's was renovated c. 1900, the roof surface was replaced and new Cathedral glass installed.

A bell hangs in the tower, made in England from iron and steel and lined with silver. Early in the church's history, the Archdeacon of Chichester (later Cardinal Henry Edward Manning) provided communion vessels copied from a 12th-century coffin of the Bishop of Chichester, a fact recorded in inscriptions on the cups. St Andrew's east window commemorates James, Charlotte and Thomas Reibey (Archdeacon of Launceston for a time). The church features an organ, originally housed in the crypt of St Paul's Cathedral, London. It was built by London organ builder J. C. Bishop around 1839, probably for a private owner. This dating is based partly on the organ's dedication plate's claim that Bishop was "Organ Builder to her Majesty" Queen Victoria, a claim that Bishop did not make until around this time. The organ's case is English oak with turned pillars at the front corners. It has a mechanical action with one manual and five speaking stops. A thorough restoration was completed in 1987 and the organ remains in use.

=== Archer's Folly ===
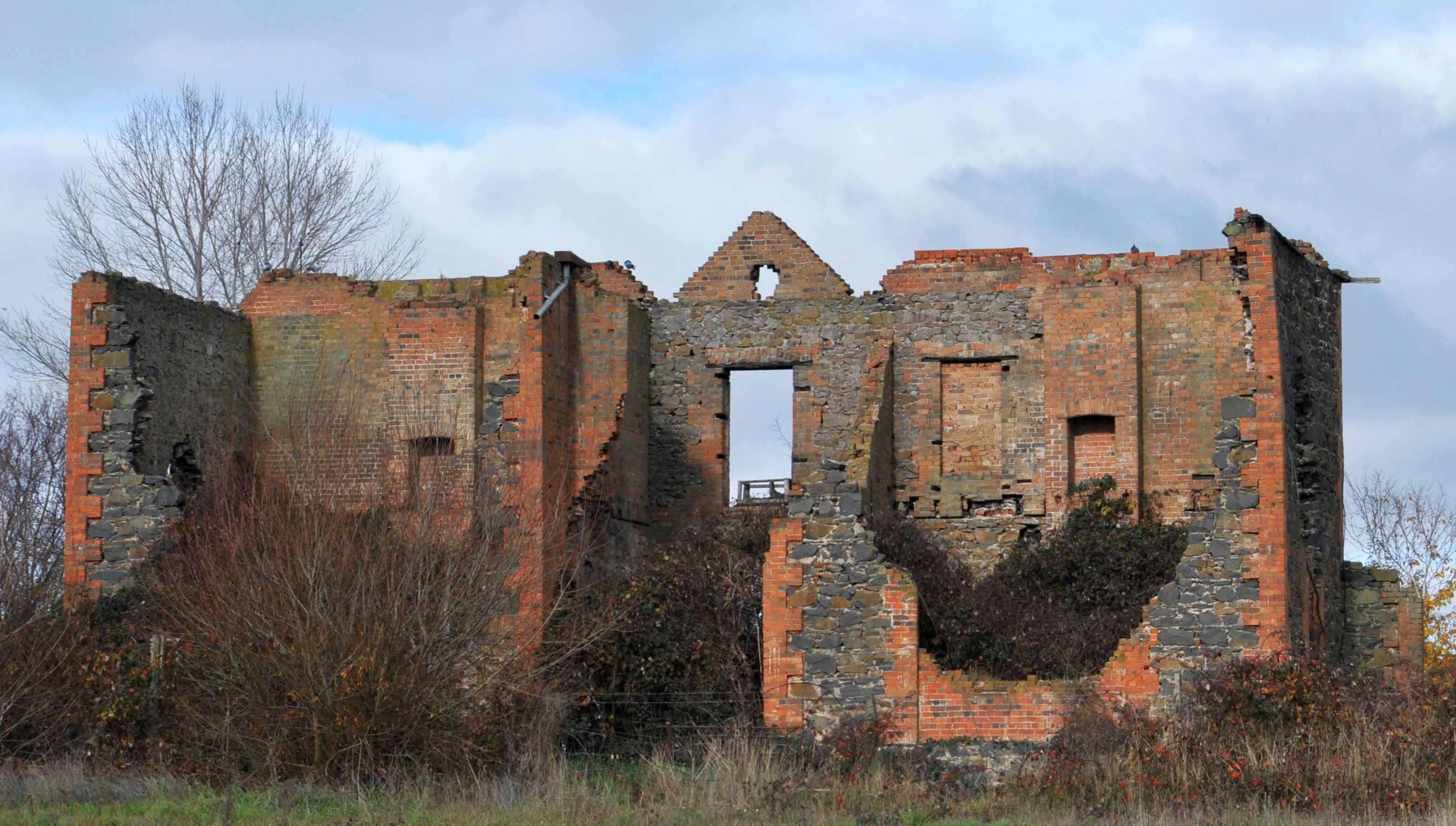
Archer's Folly in 2010

John Kinder Archer, son of Carrick's first Inn's builder, began building a large mansion on Bishopbourne Road in 1847. It was built as a substantial, brick quoin and rubble walled, two-story structure with a triple-gabled roof. It was designed to have large rooms (16 ft (4.9 m) by 30 ft (9.1 m)) and a domed driveway through the house's centre. When only four rooms were completed, the ship "The City of Launceston" sank off Adelaide with much of the supplies to complete the building. After this setback, exacerbated by the lack of insurance, Archer abandoned the building. Thomas Monds bought it in 1867 and used it for storing grain. Archer's building work created only a shell that became known as Archer's Folly. The folly was recorded by The Mercury in 1883 as both unfinished and ugly. By 1946 the Folly remained uncompleted and was used as a barn. In the late 20th century it was owned by Mirek Marik, local copper-work artist, who partly restored it. A fire broke out on 5 April 1978 and the conflagration left just a roofless shell. Marik Metal Art later built a replacement studio and workshop adjacent to the now grand ruin.

=== Hawthorne Villa ===
Hawthorne Villa is a Gothic-revival two-storey red-brick building at 1 Church Street. It was built by Thomas Monds in 1875 and is surrounded by English-style gardens that contain two large Californian Redwoods. The Villa was built on the site of Carrick's first hotel—an Adobe Inn built in the 1830s by John Archer—using some brickwork from the former building. This former building had been vacant since 1867 and was in a poor state. "The Stables" is a tourist property, set in the Villa's gardens, that is used for self-contained accommodation.

== Bibliography ==
- Branagan, J. G. (1980). Georgetown; history of the town and district. Launceston: Mary Fisher Book Shop. ISBN 0-908291-56-6.
- Clark, B A; Johnson, J M S (1981). Pipe Organs of Tasmania (revised). Hobart: Hobart Guild of Organists. ISBN 0-9598249-1-X.
- Cooper G, Goss G (compilers) (1996). Tasmanian Railways 1871–1996; 125 years. Devonport: CG publishing Co. ISBN 0-646-27633-6.
- Genealogical Society of Tasmania (G.S.O.T.) (2000). Gone but not forgotten: St Andrew's Church and Cemetery, Carrick. Launceston: The genealogical society of Tasmania inc. ISBN 1-876445-30-0.
- Greenhill, Virginia (2002). In the blink of an eye. Westbury: Westbury historical society.
- Hull, Hugh (1859). The experience of forty years in Tasmania. London: Orger & Meryon.
- Kestles Elizabeth; Nutall Gordon (1979). Sillwood: a record of a historic home near Carrick. Launceston: National Trust of Australia. ISBN 0-909575-06-1.
- Lonely Planet (October 2008). Tasmania (5th ed.). Victoria: Lonely Planet Publications. ISBN 978-1-74104-691-5.
- Hoare, Laurie (1998). Tasmanian towns in federation times. Sandford: L. Hoare. ISBN 0-646-36398-0.
- Monds, Thomas (1902). Autobiography of Thomas Wilkes Monds. Launceston: A. J. Pasmore.
- Odgers, Sally (1989). Tasmania, a guide. Roseville, NSW: Kangaroo Press. ISBN 0-86417-236-2.
- Scott, E.G. (1985). Hagley. Launceston: Birchalls. ISBN 0-949457-05-1.
- Stephens, Geoffrey (1991). The Anglican church in Tasmania. Hobart: Trustees of the Diocese. ISBN 0-646-06813-X.
- Stevenson, Beryl (1995). Water under the bridge. Carrick: B. Stevenson. ISBN 0-646-24162-1.
- Tamar regional master planning authority (T.R.M.P.A.) (1977). Carrick planning study. Launceston: Tamar Regional Master Planning Authority.
- von Stieglitz, Karl R (1946). Then and now in old Westbury; with notes on Exton, Hagley and Carrick. Launceston: Telegraph Printery.
- von Stieglitz, Karl R (1968). Entally (1821), pageant of a pioneer family, 1792–1912. Hobart: Scenery Preservation Board.
- Whishaw, May Kinloch (1963). Tasmanian Village: A story of Carrick. Launceston: Mary Kinloch Whishaw.
