= Hadspen, Tasmania =

Hadspen
- Town
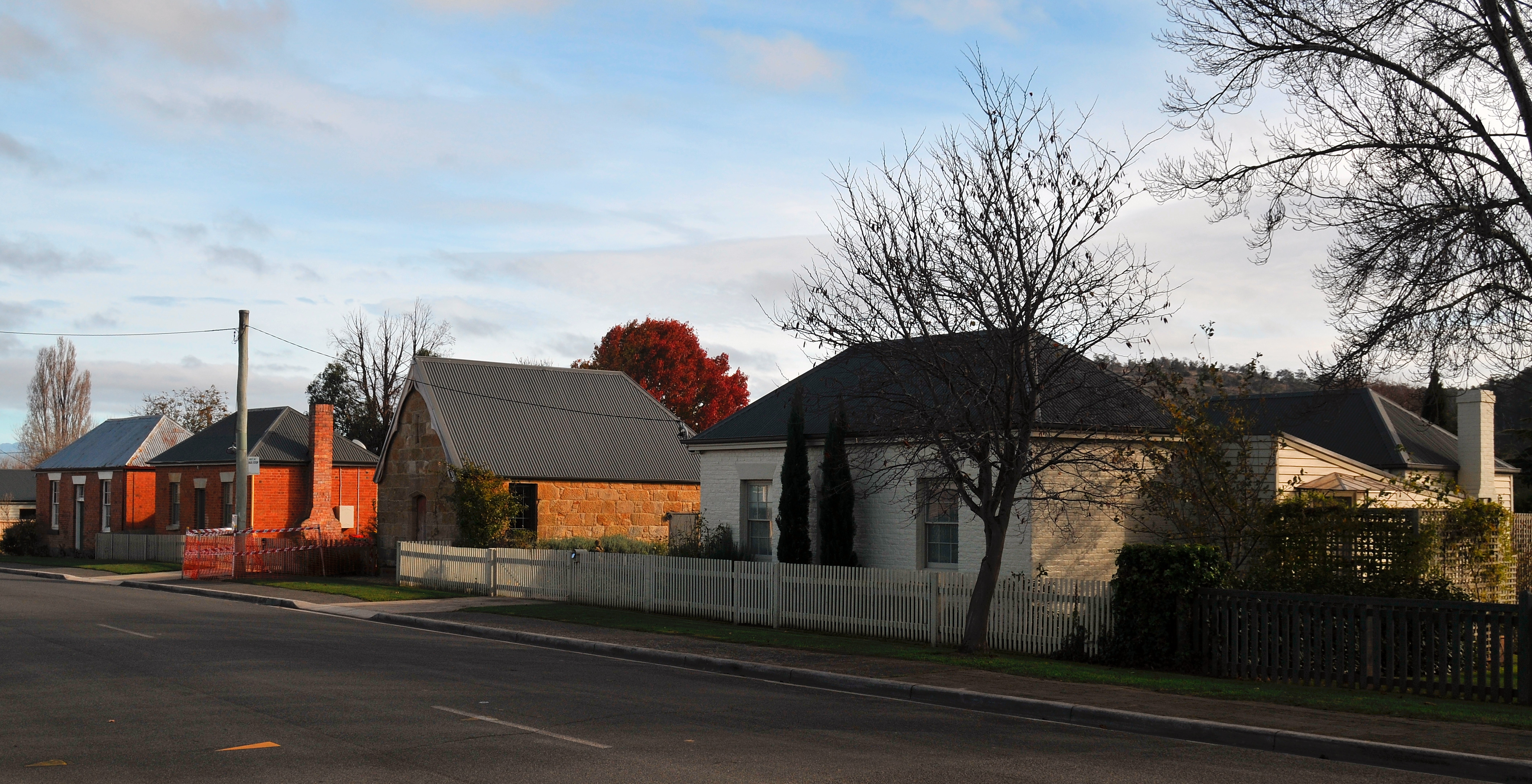
- 19th-century buildings in Hadspen's main street

- Coordinates: 41°30′S 147°04′E
- Country: Australia
- State: Tasmania
- LGA: Meander Valley Council
- Location: 8 km (5.0 mi) SW of Launceston
- Established: 1866

Government
  - State electorate: Lyons
  - Federal division: Lyons
- Elevation: 142 m (466 ft)

Population
  - Total: 2,337 (2021 census)
- Postcode: 7290
- Mean max temp: 18.5 °C (65.3 °F) (Note: Temperature averages are from the weather station at Ti Tree Bend. "LAUNCESTON (TI TREE BEND) Climate Statistics". Bureau of Meteorology.)
- Mean min temp: 7.3 °C (45.1 °F)
- Annual rainfall: 685 mm (27.0 in) (Note: Average annual rainfall of 685mm is based on data from the Bureau of Meteorology site 091315 (at Hadspen) over the only completely recorded years of 2005 to 2011; missing data from 2007 and 2009 where records are incomplete)

Hadspen is a town on the South Esk River in the north of Tasmania, Australia, 8 kilometres (5.0 mi) south west of Launceston. Hadspen has few commercial establishments and is primarily a residential suburb of nearby Launceston. Most of the town's buildings are residential, and relatively recent. The town's population of just over 2000 has grown rapidly from only a few hundred in the 1960s, and there are development plans that call for its doubling.

Settlement began in the early 19th century as a cluster of houses on the Launceston side of the river, near a frequently-flooded ford. Over time various bridges were built, largely on the same site, across the river. Though it had been settled for some time, Hadspen was officially declared in 1866. Hadspen was originally on the main road from Launceston to Devonport, but the town's centre was bypassed in the late 20th century. There have been schools, both secular and religious, in its history, though none now remain.

The town has heritage-listed properties and few others from colonial times. The town's historic centrepiece is Entally House, built in 1819 as a wealthy settler's colonial estate. It was the former family home of Thomas Reibey, Premier of Tasmania from 1876 to 1877. The Red Feather Inn was built in the 1840s and is currently used for accommodation and also has an on-site restaurant. The Tasmanian Walking Company use the inn as their northern walker base. A gaol from the same time reflects Tasmania's convict past. The Uniting Church building dates back over 150 years, originally as a Wesleyan chapel, and the Anglican Church of the Good Shepherd is known for taking over ninety years to complete.

== Geography ==
Hadspen lies approximately 142 metres (466 ft) above sea level, 8 kilometres (5.0 mi) Southwest of Launceston, Tasmania. It is on the southern side of the South Esk River, near the confluence of the South Esk and Meander Rivers. The town is set in a rural landscape; Surrounding countryside contains valleys, river flood plains, remnant uncleared bush and undulating pastures. The majority of the town lies between the South Esk, and a low section of land east of the town called Beams Hollow, which is named after Thomas Beams, owner of a 50 acres (20 ha) lot through which the road from Launceston first ran.

== History ==
As of 1831, there was a settlement named Hadspen near a ford of the South Esk River. A road was proposed from Launceston, crossing the river at this ford near Thomas Haydock Reibey's property of Entally. The name may have been given by surveyor George Frankland after Hadspen house and garden, an estate in Somerset, England. By the 1840s Hadspen was a small cluster of houses near "Reibey's ford", and the river crossing was now on the main road from Launceston. Hadspen Post Office opened on 1 November 1849, though the town was not declared in the government gazette until January 1866. A bridge was constructed in the early 1840s replacing the often impassable ford, and during the next century the bridge was often repaired and sometimes replaced.

Hadspen.-This rural township, long marked out on the maps, is fast assuming the appearance of a village. It is situated close to and on this side of Reibey's Bridge. Mr. Sprunt lately obtained a licence to open an inn, which is a large and commodious brick building. Several cottages are erected, and a blacksmith's forge for the convenience of surrounding settlers will soon be at work. Abundance of excellent stone is found within a few yards of the spot, and we observe one gentleman has built a remarkably neat cottage, fronting the main street, of this material. The distance from Launceston is about eight miles, and if the road were slightly repaired the drive in this direction would be the most pleasant in the neighbourhood

— The Examiner, 22 December 1844

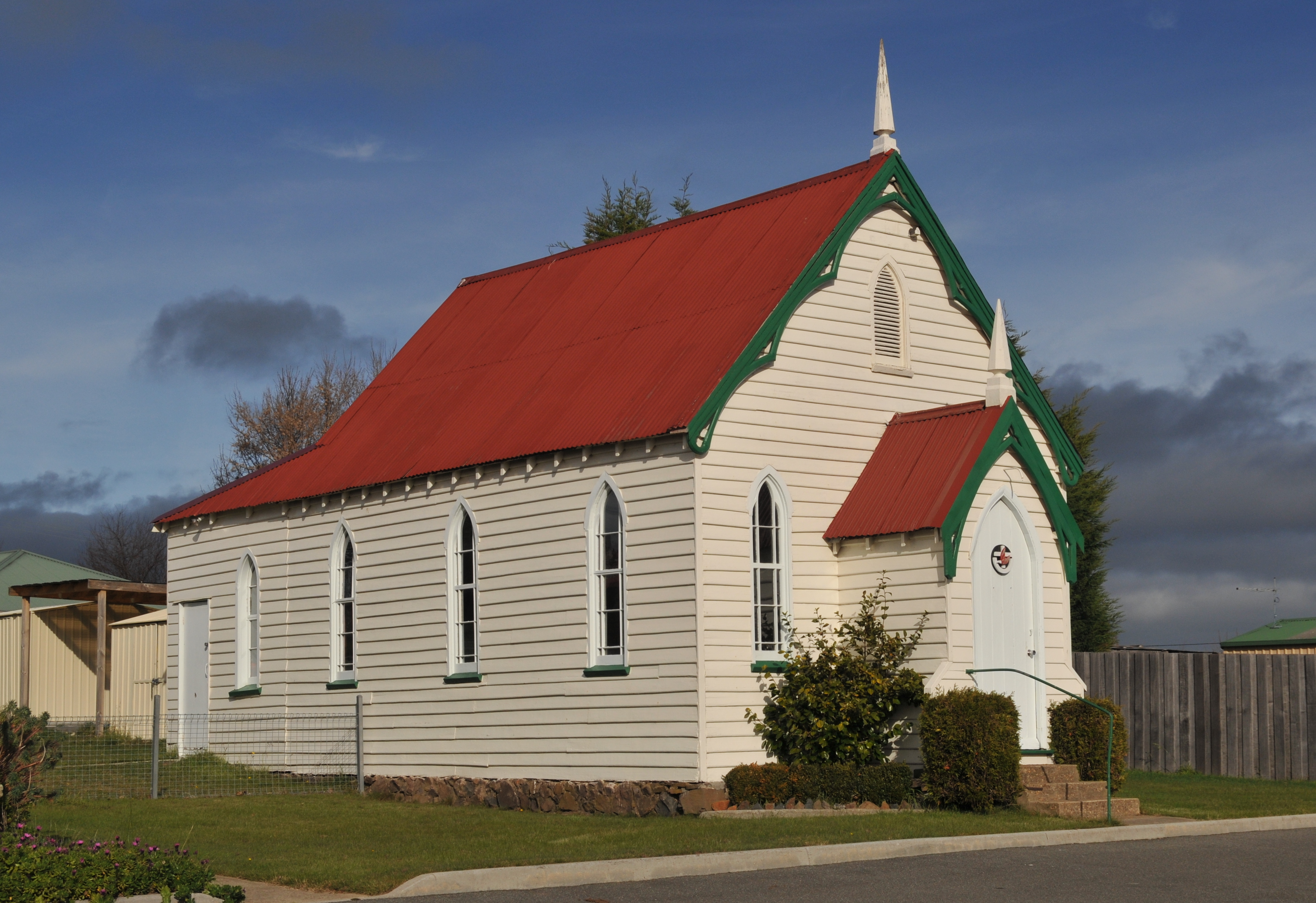
Hadspen's Uniting Church, built in 1874

In early years there were two Hotels: Cricket Club Hotel near the river, which was partly destroyed by flood in the 1870s and subsequently demolished, and Hadspen Hotel, a convict-built sandstone structure. By 1881 both had closed and there were no hotels in the town. An application to re-licence a building opposite the Wesleyan church was unsuccessful. The Hadspen Hotel was a private home in the early 20th century and remains as part of the town's heritage. None of these hotels are open in the 21st century, the Rutherglen complex on the town's west is the only licensed premises. There was a brewery in the town for a time, though it has long closed. The postal service from Hadspen originally was handled by a licensee operating from a shop, and subsequently from one of hotels. By 1966 the post office was in a separate building on the site of the former blacksmith's shop.

There was an early reference to churches in 1844 when the Examiner noted that Bishop Nixon "laid the foundation stone of a new church at Hadspen, Reibey's ford" though it is not stated which church. This church is likely to have been a small wooden one that was the first used by the Church of England. The then Reverend Thomas Reibey had a small stone chapel built at Entally in 1850. Though it was intended for the employees of the estate it was used by some in the town. From the 1870s Reibey himself conducted some of the services in this chapel. The Uniting Church building in Hadspen's main street is a small, weatherboard colonial church. There was a Wesleyan chapel in the town by at least 1852 as well as another small church. In July 1874 the current Uniting church building was completed as a Wesleyan Chapel, that by 1924 was part of the Methodist church. The grounds the church is on were owned by the Wesleyans as early as 1865.

== Schools ==
In 1845, local members of the Church of England, as part of a petition calling for funding, stated that they had established a new school. By 1848, there was also a Wesleyan Sunday School with 20 students. By 1867, there was a secular state school in the town, though funding was inconstant and the school was closed for at least the next two years. This school never grew large; as of 1903 it had an average attendance of 20 students.

The school was still operating in 1937, though a public request had been made for regular transport to take children to the Hagley District School, in consequence of the Hadspen school's impending closure. Children from the town began attending the Hagley school in March 1938. By the middle of the same year a tender was approved by the Minister of Education for regular school transport. The transport was also for students from nearby Carrick, whose school closed in the 1930s. The school building was finally removed; a tender in 1944 called for it to be removed and re-erected at Falmouth. Schools have also been run in other town buildings, including a hall near the Anglican church, that was used for worship before the church's completion, in what is now the Uniting Church and also in another building that later became a private home. In the 21st century there are no schools remaining in Hadspen.

== Demographics ==
Hadspen was a small town for most of its early life; its population in 1966 was 311. It grew quickly from the 1970s to the 1990s after subdivisions were developed in South Esk Drive and Roebourne Avenue. Over this period the population doubled. In the 2001 census, 29% of the town's population was under 14—one of the highest proportions in Tasmania—and future forecast growth means that the town is expected to require a primary school. The population grew from 1,334 in 1991, to 1,848 in 2001, 1,926 in 2006, and 2,063 in the last census results in 2011. Within the town's current footprint its population is expected to reach 2,155 by 2016. The Meander Valley Council, in a March 2011 development plan, forecast Hadspen's population doubling over the subsequent two decades.

The town's population is almost entirely Australian-born; over 90% as of 2011 compared to the average for all Australia of less than 69%. In almost all (96.9%) of homes only English is spoken, again a contrast to the Australian average of 76.8%. Median income is slightly higher than the country's average and the unemployment rate is slightly lower.

== Transport ==
Hadspen was an important stop on the coach route from Launceston to Deloraine from at least the 1840s. The coach service declined from when rail transport started in Tasmania in the late 1860s. The State Government began operating a school bus from town, to Hagley, in the 1930s. Meander Valley Highway, formerly known as Bass Highway, passes through the edge of the town bypassing the old main street. Bass Highway, which connects Launceston, Burnie and Devonport, branches off from this east of the town at Travellers Rest and passes south of Hadspen.

In the 21st century the town has three bus services: Redline Coaches runs a daily school bus service that passes through Hadspen to many of the Schools in and around Launceston; Westbus, another private company, takes students to Hagley Farm School and onwards to Westbury Primary School; Metro Tasmania's public bus service connects Hadspen and the Rutherglen Holiday Village to the centre of Launceston.

== Sport ==
Cricket has been played in Hadspen, at Entally and grounds nearer the town's centre, since at least the 1860s. (Note: Results of cricket played by clubs based in Hadspen, and some matches by a Hadspen Ladies Cricket team were reported in many editions of the Examiner and Cornwall Chronicle newspapers from at least 1863.) The cricket oval at Entally was one of the first in Australia and was hosting matches before Melbourne's foundation. During his side's 1874 tour of Australia the great English cricketer W. G. Grace played on the ground. Aside from cricket Entally's grounds were often open for picnics and grand annual events. The Hadspen Chieftains cricket club was formed in the 1987–88 season and plays as part of the Northern Tasmania Cricket Association. They won the association's A grade premiership in the 1991–92 and 1993–94 seasons, and the Charltons Cup Premiership—a combined competition with the North East Cricket Association—in the 1993–94 and 1994–95 seasons.

Entally house has been associated with horse racing though the activities of Thomas Riebey. For a while there was horse racing at Entally Park itself, and ninety horses were raced from Entally's stable. Two of these won wide acclaim: Stockwell was second in the Melbourne Cup and won the Carrick plate in 1881; Malua, stated by the Sydney Bulletin to be the "greatest horse of all time", won the Melbourne cup in 1884, though this was after his time at Entally.

== Heritage properties ==
Hadspen has buildings that are largely intact from colonial times, some of which date from the early parts of the 19th century. The Red Feather inn, an adjacent convict-era gaol and four cottages form a cluster of heritage buildings in the midst of the town. The gaol is a sandstone structure that was used to overnight convicts. The inn, gaol and watchmans's cottage, St Andrew's church and Entally House are all listed on the Tasmanian Heritage Register, a recognition of their "historic cultural heritage significance to the whole of Tasmania".

=== Entally House ===
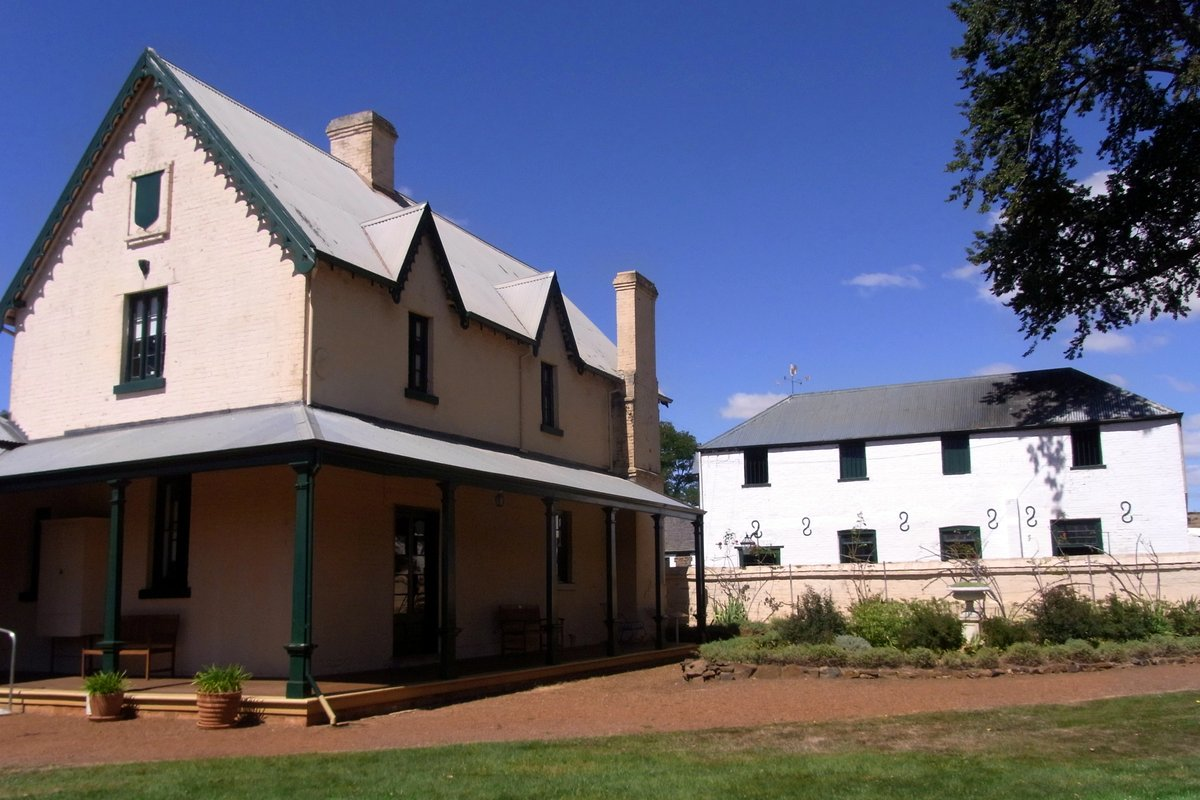
Part of Entally's main house and the stables

Entally House is a heritage listed property on the western bank of the South Esk River. It, and the buildings of Rutherglen Holiday Village, are the only part of the town on this side. Entally is set on 85 acres (34 ha) of grounds, and contains a large colonial house, stables, a chapel, other outbuildings and several hectares of vineyards. The buildings are filled with indicative furniture and art of their time, including carriages and coaches in the coach house.

Thomas Reibey had been in service with the East India Company when he met his wife Mary Haydock. He formed a trading company in Sydney and named its building "Entally House" after a suburb of Calcutta, India. Trading also brought his sons, Thomas Haydock and James, to Tasmania in the early 19th century. By 1816 James owned land near Hadspen and he purchased more in the 1820s. Thomas Haydock and Mary, his mother, purchased 2,630 acres (1,064 ha) in 1818 in the then District of Cornwall, encompassing the present day site of Entally, and Thomas Haydock built the initial house in 1819. The original building was apparently a single storey structure, its two square towers arrayed with defensive musket slots. It has been significantly extended and surrounded by outbuildings since. When Thomas Haydock Reibey died in October 1842 his son, Thomas Reibey, inherited it along with 4,000 acres (1,620 ha) of land and "The Oaks", a property at nearby Carrick that now hosts the agricultural field days known as Agfest.

This latter Reibey was a leading figure in the Anglican Church in the area, and became later Premier of Tasmania. He built a private chapel at Entally, with wooden furnishings and an organ. He is remembered as having a great interest in horse racing and hunting; deer and horses were bred at Entally. At least 90 horses were raced from Entally's stables over time including the famous "Stockwell" and Malua. By 1883, the library was reported as the most extensive in the colony. Entally's lawn was used often for picnics and cricket matches. In the 1930s Rutherglen, now on the opposite side of the Meander Valley Highway, was part of Entally estate. It was home to some 300, ninety-year-old hazelnut trees that were under investigation regarding the prospect of growing Hazelnuts in Australia for Cadbury chocolate production.

On Reibey's death in February 1912 the property passed to his Nephew—Thomas Reibey Arthur—as Reibey had no children, and by 1929 the property was no longer in family hands. In December 1948, after two years of negotiation, the land and buildings were acquired by the Scenery Preservation Board. The property was reserved as a "historic site", more for its heritage value as a colonial home than its association with Reibey. Since then the house has been restored and filled with furniture, though not to original form, but rather as a facsimile of a wealthy 19th-century colonial settler's estate. Management of the site moved to the National Parks and Wildlife Service at its formation in Nov 1971. The State Government took over management in 2004, due to the expense of upkeep and concern over the property's condition. Timber company Gunns was by 2005 looking at managing the property and planting 5–6 hectares of premium wine grapes. They leased it from 2005 partly to showcase wine, though the property remained open for visitors. In late 2010 Gunns handed management and control of the property back to the State Government and from then it was maintained by volunteers. Youth Futures, an employment training organisation, was given the task of managing the now established vineyard.

=== Church of the Good Shepherd ===
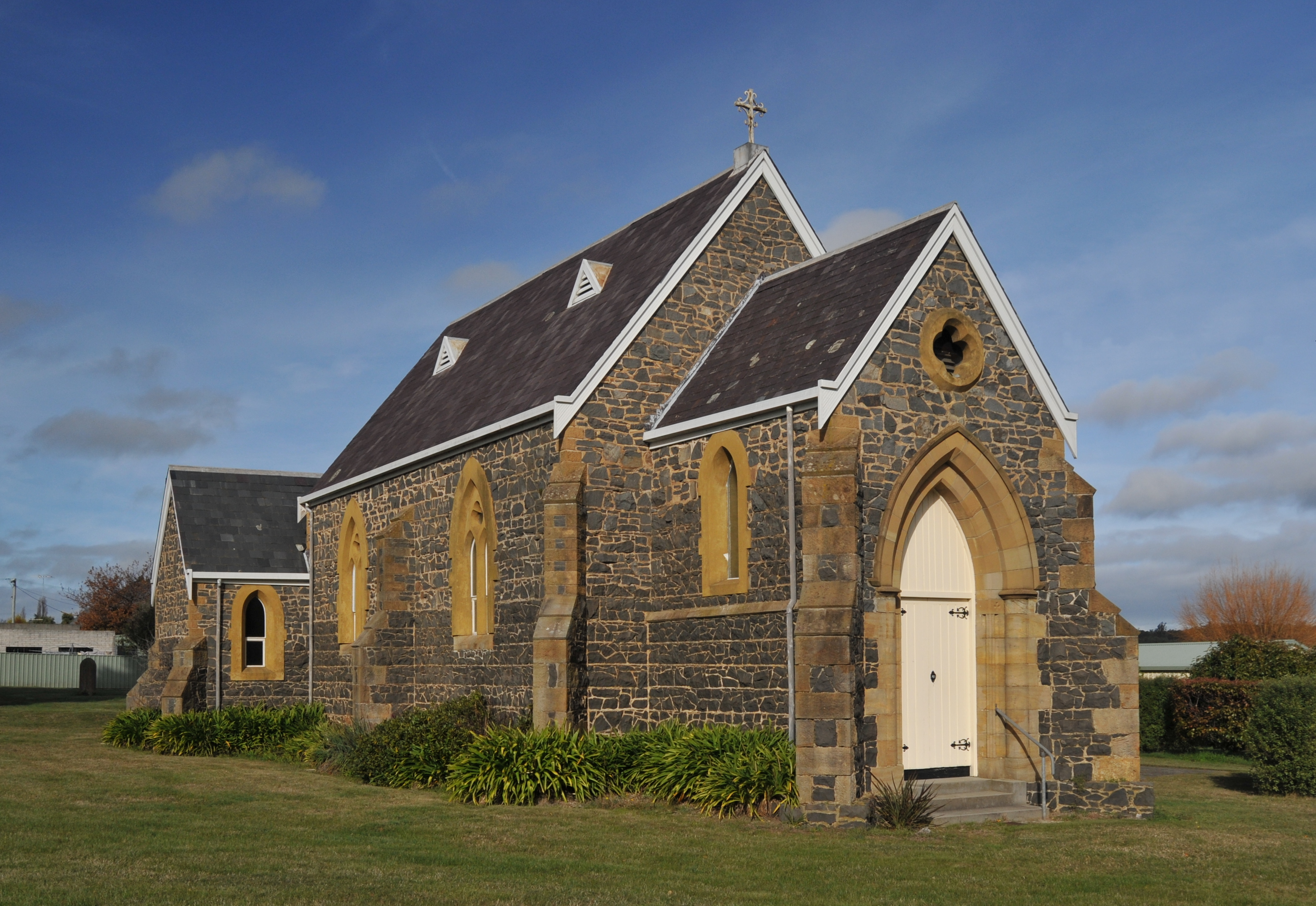
Anglican Church of the Good Shepherd in 2012

An Anglican church was planned for Hadspen in the late 1850s. Thomas Reibey had William Gilbee Habershon and Edward Habershon of Messrs. Habershon and Brothers, Bloomsbury Square, London draw up plans in 1857. The building's design was based on St Mary's Church, Lutterworth, England. It was designed in an early English style with blue ironstone walls, with freestone dressings and reliefs. The nave was 37.5 feet (11.4 m) long, the chancel 17 × 15 feet, with a small vestry on the northern side, and the entrance was through a 40-foot (12 m) tower with a 24-foot (7 m) spire. Construction was estimated to cost £1000, began with locally sourced stonework by Robert Sleightholm, whom Reibey met on a ship from England.

The foundation stone of "The new Episcopalian Church, Hadspen" or "The Reibey Church" was laid on 23 December 1868. At this point, only sufficient funds had been collected by the united efforts of Archdeacon Reibey and several of the villagers to make a start towards enabling the buildings erection. The ceremony began first in front of the older wooden church building opened in 1845, built adjacent and fit to accommodate 150 people. It had also been used as a schoolroom for many years, and continued to be used in this way for at least a decade after the new church's foundation stone was laid. By 1868, it was described in a report from the event as having, "reached the last stage of dilapidation".

The Lord Bishop of Tasmania, the Right Reverend Charles Henry Bromby, was attended at the ceremony by the Venerable Archdeacon Thomas Reibey of Launceston. Alongside was Reverend Charles Reibey Arthur, the Archdeacon's nephew, who had been appointed as incumbent of both Carrick and Hadspen (St. Andrews) that same year; Reverend Edward Patten Adams, incumbent of St. Marks Deloraine; Reverend John Marshall Norman, serving at Cressy and Lake River; Reverend Alfred Nathaniel Mason of Holy Trinity parish in Evandale; Reverend Canon Henry Offley Irwin, rector of St Mary's Hagley; Reverend Samuel Berjew Fookes of St Andrews Perth; Reverend Montagu Williams, rector of St Andrews Westbury; and, Reverend William F. Mitchell of Bishopsbourne and Illawarra (near Carrick on the South Esk).

The ceremony began with the singing of No. 135 of Hymns Ancient and Modern, then the Bishop offered prayer, and Psalm 84 was then sung by the clergy and choir. After which Archdeacon Reibey's wife, Catherine (nee. Macdonald Kyle), declared, "In the faith of Jesus Christ we place this foundation stone, in the name of God the Father, God the Son, and God the Holy Ghost", proclaiming the stone laid. The Bishop delivered an address, Psalms 67 and 122 were chanted, No. 241 of Hymns Ancient and Modern sung, and a prayer was again offered by the Bishop before he pronounced the Benediction. £9 pounds was placed upon the stone after the ceremony in offering toward the new church's construction.

When the structure was mostly complete a scandal erupted around Archdeacon Reibey. He was alleged to have indecently dealt with a married woman, Mrs Blomfield, a daughter of James Cox of Clarendon. The entire Cox family had been very close friends with the Reibey's for many years. Incidentally, the indecency allegations made by Mr Blomfield on behalf of his wife, arose during the infamous Cox/Clarendon estate dispute, for which Reibey was caught in the middle of as executor/Trustee of the estate upon the deaths of both James Cox in 1866, and later, his second wife, Eliza Eddington, the daughter of Governor David Collins. After the formers death in 1868, the entire estate was to be inherited by Cox's grandson, James, who, in following traditional English lines of succession, was first in line after his father, John had died in 1853. Upon his death, James Cox Senior had fathered 23 children, 12 to his first wife, Mary Jane (nee. Connell), who died in 1828, and 11 by his second wife, Eliza.

Margaret was the eighth daughter of James Cox's second marriage, his 16th daughter and 19th child. She married Henry Wilson Blomfield, the fifth son of Lieutenant-Colonel Thomas Valentine Blomfield, a prominent British soldier, magistrate, and pioneer settler of Denham Court, Sydney, N.S.W, and his wife Christiana Jane Brooks, in October 1864. Henry Blomfield raised the allegations that Reibey had tried to seduce his wife with Bishop Bromby in a letter 1868, then in 1870 with no action by the Church again with the Church of England Synod in England.

Outraged, Reibey took libel action against the Blomfield's to the Supreme Court of Tasmania for the allegations, which he preported to be wholly untrue. It was reported in many circles that the jury was prejudiced against Reibey even before the trial was begun, and, to make matters even more insulting, the Bishop, when called to the stand, testified in what was noted as a confused and bumbling manner. Despite Mrs Blomfield's contradictory testimony, and Mr Blomfield's apparently drunken state while he was on the stand, Reibey's complaint was dismissed and the Jury held that the allegations against him were largely true. Despite most of the public siding with the Blomfield's, primarily as a result of the salacious reporting within local newspapers rather than knowledge of any actual evidence, many influential citizens upheld Reibey's innocence until his dying days, including the then Governor, Charles du Cane and his wife, who had stayed at Entally during the trial.

With his reputation in taters, it seemed Reibey was forced to resign the Archdeaconry. However, during the dramatic 1870 court case, he entered contemporaneous correspondence with several church leaders, as well as his wife and family, in order to argue his innocence. Reibey later published the correspondence in a printed pamphlet to attempt to prove his resignation had nothing to do with the Blomfield scandal. Instead, he claimed he quit out of pure frustration over the incumbency of St John's Church in Launceston, four days prior to Blomfield's confrontation.

After decades as the Anglican Church of Tasmania's most generous philanthropist and champion, Rev. Thomas Reibey removed himself from Church of England, instead focussing his financial giving to other local and secular causes. After only a few years the lack of funds able to be provided solely by the tiny community of congregants in Hadspen left only one person working on the new church's construction. All work ceased in 1870, by which time the walls were unfinished and the building still lacked a roof. Services were held that year primarily in the chapel at Entally, or in the old building. Though the church was incomplete both Reibey and his wife Catherine were buried in a graveyard at the building's rear.

The church remained incomplete for over ninety years. By 1957 Anglican services were being held in St Stephen's, the wooden church built in 1845 next to the apparent ruin. Around this time some in the church showed interest in completion of the old structure, partly due to the approaching centenary of construction beginning. In April of that year a gathering of people from the Parish of Carrick was held in the unfinished building, and a prayer held to bless its completion. The gathering, and associated committee, were led and chaired by William Rothwell Barrett, assistant bishop of Tasmania. Many from the St Andrew's Church in Carrick contributed to the finishing of the building.

The original architects' plans had been preserved—though they were close to disintegration—and were largely followed in the subsequent construction work. A Launceston builder was contracted for the work, though much, including flooring, was performed by volunteers. Work was completed at an approximate cost of £8000, and the church was finally completed on 20 May 1961, with the first service held the following day. Some furnishings in the church came from Entally's Chapel including the altar and coverings, a wooden cross, symbolic paintings and a bell now hung in the church's porch. The bell, formerly in St Stephen's in Smithton, carries the inscription "Kains 1817" and probably comes from the whaler Kains which was wrecked in 1835. A stained glass window at the rear of the church originated in Entally's chapel, and spent time installed in another nearby church. It shows the crucifixion of Jesus and the Good Shepherd. The church is a Gothic Revival design and somewhat scaled down from the original plans, the nave was built 10 feet (3.0 m) shorter, with some changed elements such as the entrance being built in stone on the west side rather than wood on the south. The church was consecrated in February 1973.

=== Red Feather Inn ===
The Red Feather Inn is a heritage listed building in Hadspen's main street. It was built as a coaching inn and in the 21st century has been used for a restaurant and accommodation. The building's frontage is a substantial sandstone single-storey building. Land falls away sharply from the street and the building's rear has two-storeys. Rising affluence in the 1840s had enabled growth of the coach transport industry. When built the Red Feather Inn was the first horse-change point on the road from Launceston, 8 miles (13 km) away, to Deloraine, and it was one of the colony's earliest coaching inns. It was built, starting in 1842, for local police magistrate Charles Arthur. It was built by John Sprunt, also builder of Macquarie House in Launceston's civic square, using convict hewn sandstone blocks.

The inn was first licensed in 1844 and was at first successful. In only a few decades its fortunes declined when a rail line was built from Launceston, reaching nearby Carrick in 1869. The economy of rail transport took goods and passengers away, forcing wagons from the road. This reduced the demand for coaching inns, and led to a general decline in traffic through and business in the town. As of 2004 it was run as a restaurant and, after a 2008 refurbishment, has been used for accommodation and a cooking school.

== Bridges ==
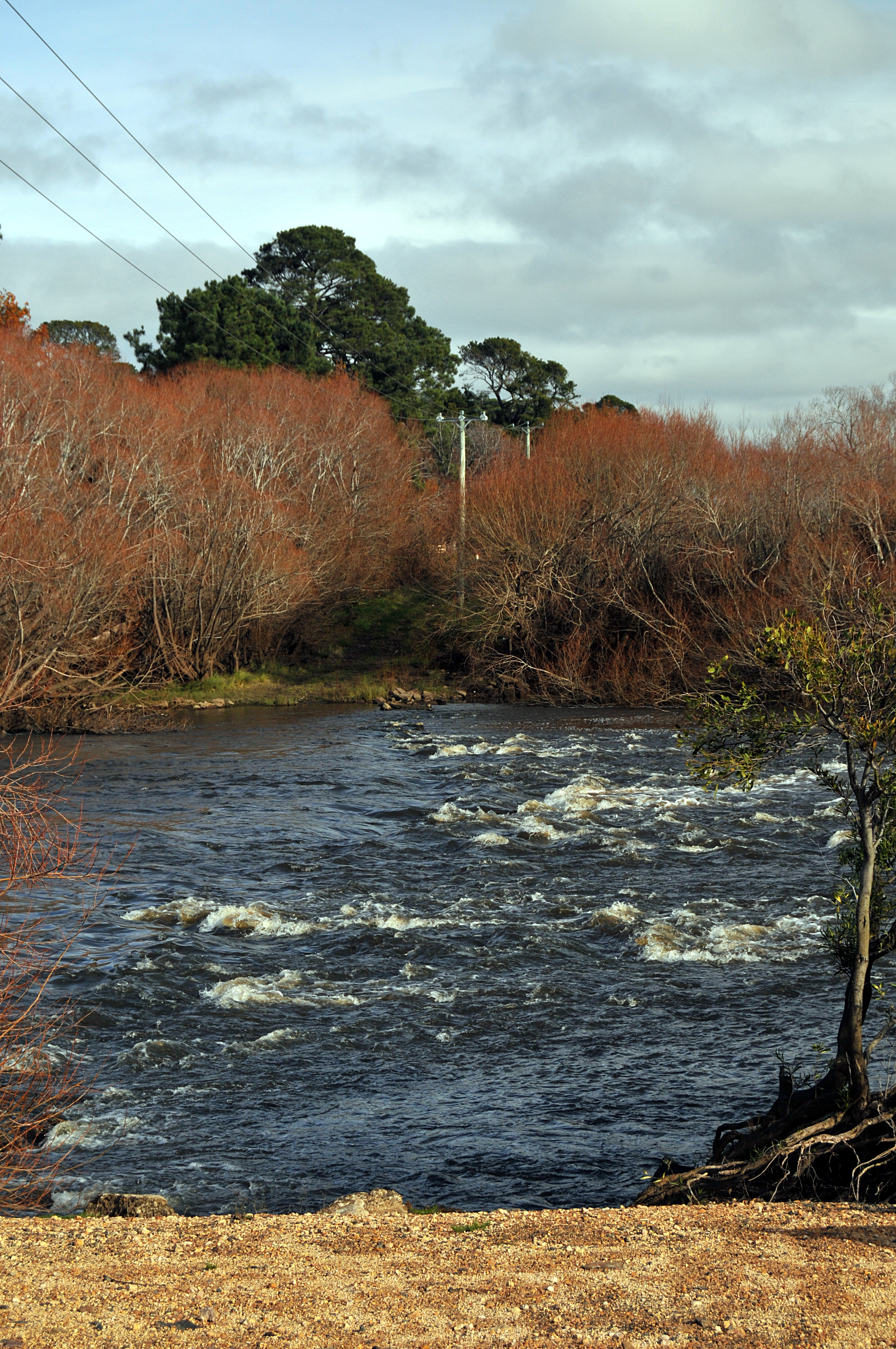
Site of Reibey's Ford and subsequent bridges

Flooding of the South Esk River and the need for a river crossing have constrained transport in the town for much of its history. The South Esk, now crossed by a bridge on the Meander Valley Highway, separates the town from settlements further west and unusually high floods can cut the highway on the town's east, when it is submerged at Beams Hollow. The river was first crossed by a ford known as "Reibey's Ford" near Entally House. Due to the variability in its flow this ford was frequently impassable requiring traffic to make significant detours. (Note: Until the town's centre was bypassed via a concrete bridge, flooding of the ford or bridge required diversion as far as Longford 12 kilometres (7 mi) away) Thomas Haydock Reibey installed a punt at the crossing in 1828. By a specially passed Government act he was allowed to charge a toll for its use.

Tenders were called for in 1836 for design and construction of a bridge at the village of Hadspen. Five years later the colony's government passed "Reibey's ford act" to facilitate construction of a bridge. The act specified that of the £1500 cost for the bridge, £500 was to be paid by the government, and the remainder by Thomas Haydock Reibey. To recover the costs Reibey was allowed to charge a toll, assisted by a toll house and by turnpikes at the bridge's ends. On construction the toll was mandated as 1d per person, 1s per wagon or carriage, 4d per unladen beast and 1/2d per calf, sheep, pig or lamb. The elder Reibey died before the bridge was completed and his son and executor Thomas Reibey acquired his father's rights, collecting the tolls after the bridge was completed. The toll was to run for the lesser of 30 years, or whatever time it took to pay for the original bridge construction costs plus an annual 15% interest. The wooden bridge was completed by November 1843, and within a little over a year the tolls had raised 453 pounds. It was known as "Reibey's Bridge" and was narrow—fitting only a single wagon—with a single chain each side for safety, a fact that caused the loss of at least one valuable horse.

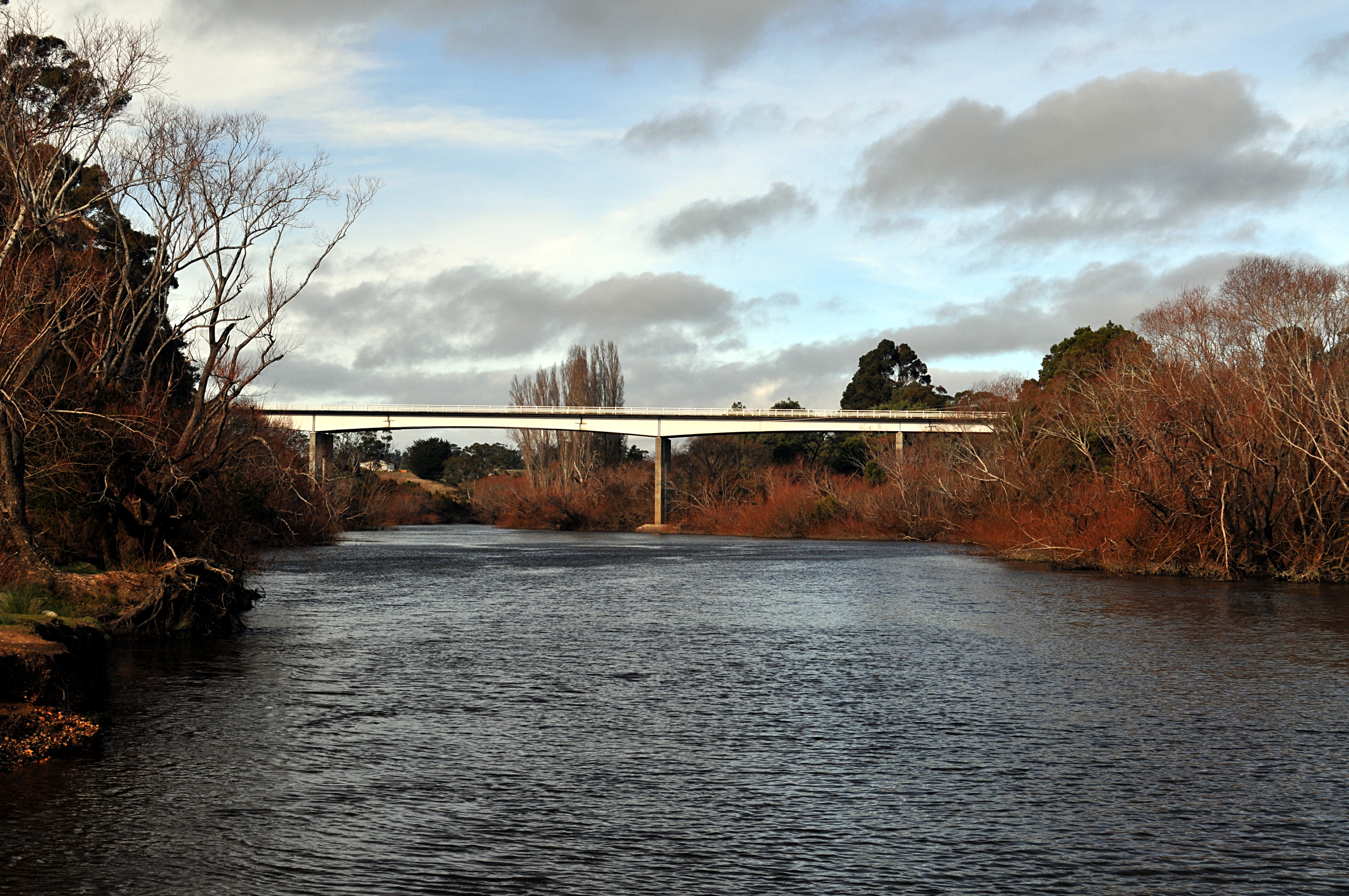
Meander Valley highway's bridge over the South Esk at Hadspen, 2012

The bridge became noted for its insecure state, the lack of rails a particular issue, and it was referred to as "dangerous and unsightly". (Note: The bridge's safety problems were often reported in newspapers of the day, including the Cornwall Chronicle on 15 and 25 September 1852 and 3 June 1854) A new bridge, 3 feet (1 m) higher than the one it replaced, was under construction in 1878. This new structure was 350 feet (107 m) long, had a wooden frame and deck standing on stone piers. Floods continued to overflow Hadspen's only bridge, floods in 1893 may have been 8 feet (2.4 m) above the bridge's approach road's level; both the bridge and approach roads were extensively damaged and 250 feet (76 m) of guard rails were carried away.

By 1911 the river was crossed, on the same site, with a steel bridge. This new structure had concrete buttresses and a wooden roadway. In March of that year floods over-topped it by approximately 10 feet (3.0 m) and five of the bridge's seven spans went down, girders were broken, piers sheared through, and some swept into the river. The bridge was repaired later in the year and stood for another half century. Over time, particularly after floods, there were calls for the bridge to be raised, though the expense of the work—and the only occasional nature of flooding—was cited in defence of the bridge's adequacy. When the river flooded the bridge, it also often flooded Beams Ford on the other side of Hadspen, temporarily cutting off all road access to the town.

The Minister for Land and Works had approved work on raising it in 1939, but this was postponed indefinitely due to World War II. Raising or renewal of the bridge was again being investigated in 1946. The river again flooded over the bridge in July 1952, the first time since the mid-1940s, and the timber deck was still being repaired into 1953. The last and latest bridge was constructed as part of a bypass of the centre of Hadspen. By 1978, the Bass Highway crossed the river further upstream and the old main road was no longer a through road. This bridge is a 240 metres (790 ft) long two-lane single-carriageway concrete structure.

== Today's town ==
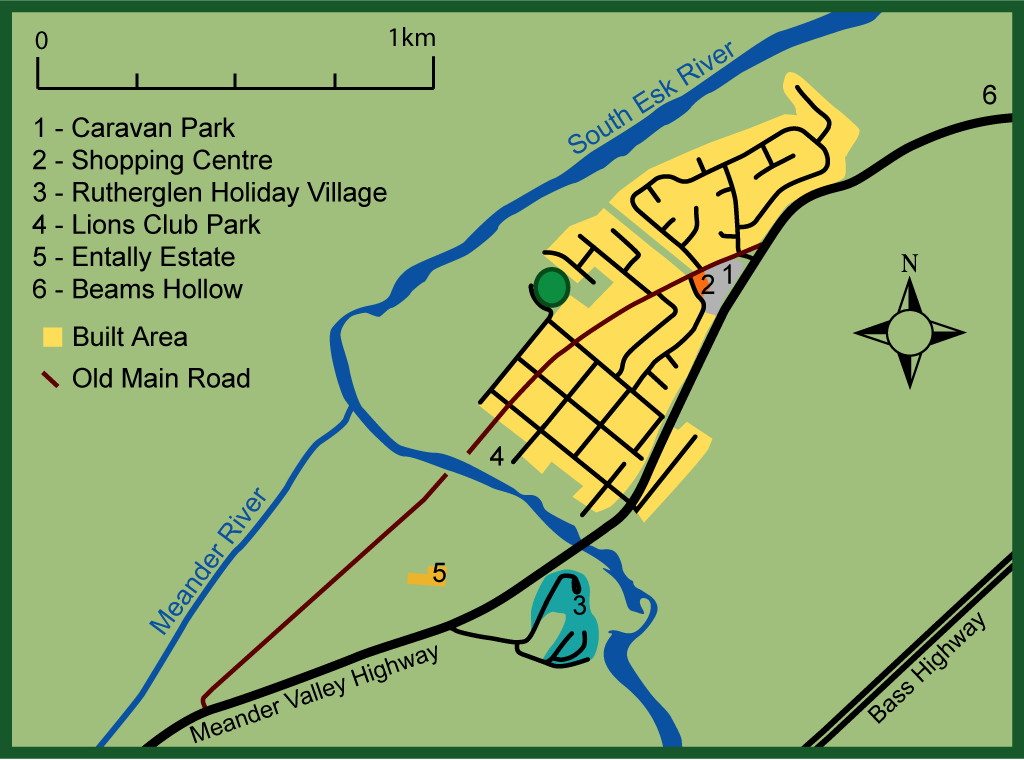
Hadspen as of 2012

Hadspen is a small town that functions as a "dormitory suburb", an extension of the Launceston metropolitan area. Entally House lies on the Town's west, across the river. The town has a small shopping centre with a post office and service station, adjacent to a large caravan and cabin park. Development has been almost entirely residential and mostly on the northern side of Meander Valley Highway. Over 13 hectares (32 acres) of land was already zoned for development within the town boundary as of 2005, and the council plans to allow further expansion on the Highway's south. A 1978 study looked at various areas around Hadspen for development, the only area to date where this has happened is the small expansion of the town south of the Highway on the river's east bank.

The town is in the Meander Valley Council local government area, both the federal and state electoral Division of Bass, and the Tasmanian Legislative Council electoral division of Western Tiers.

Hadspen has grown without any area set aside for small commercial operations, a fact that has led to just a single shopping complex. There was another service station, in the main street, but it closed in 2008 after operating for approximately forty years. Rutherglen is a holiday village, conference and event centre, and retirement village on the town's west. It is the only premises in Hadspen with a general liquor licence. Rutherglen, or a similarly named premises at the same location, has been used for accommodation since at least 1923. The town has access to reticulated water and sewerage. The town's sewerage has been, since the mid-1970s, processed at a plant near Carrick that also serves that town. Treated waste-water from there is discharged into a tributary of the Liffey River.

== Bibliography ==
- Clifford, Craig (1971). A guide to Entally House (Hadspen, Tasmania): with catalogue of contents (13 ed.). Hobart: National Parks and Wildlife Service.
- Church of the Good Shepherd (1962). The Church of The Good Shepherd, Hadspen, Tasmania. Launceston: Foot & Playstead.
- Dyer, Alan F (1990). John Dyer, 1809–1882, and his descendants: free immigrant to Van Diemen's Land, Longford Farmer, Hadspen innkeeper, Kentish pioneer. Sheffield, Tasmania: Pioneer. ISBN 0-646-01393-9.
- West, John (1852). The history of Tasmania, Volume 2. H Dowling.
- Kelly, Ray (1966). Looking back at Hadspen. Launceston: Ray Kelly.
- Genealogical Society of Tasmania (G.S.O.T.) (2000). Gone but not forgotten: St Andrew's Church and Cemetery, Carrick. Launceston: The genealogical society of Tasmania inc. ISBN 1-876445-30-0.
- MacFarlane, W. H. (1957). The Reibey Church at Hadspen. Launceston: Foot & Playstead.
- Meander Valley Council (April 2005). Land Use and Development Strategy; Extract from the Strategic Plan for Meander Valley 2004–2014. Westbury: Meander Valley Council.
- National Parks and Wildlife Service (NPWS) (1977). Entally House : one of Tasmania's most historic homes / National Parks and Wildlife Service. Hobart: Tasmanian Government. ISBN 0-7246-0359-X.
- Rawlings, Charles; Worby, Meg; Mocatta, Gabi (2008). Tasmania. Footscray: Lonely Planet. ISBN 978-1-74104-691-5.
- Stephens, Geoffrey (1991). The Anglican Church in Tasmania (A diocesan history to mark the sesquicentenary). Hobart: Trustees of the Diocese. ISBN 0-646-06813-X.
- Stevenson, Beryl (1995). Water under the bridge. Carrick: B. Stevenson. ISBN 0-646-24162-1.
- Tamar Regional Master Planning Authority (TRMPA) (June 1978). Meander & South Esk Rivers. Rural-Residential Study. Tamar Regional Master Planning Authority.
- von Stieglitz, Karl R (1968). Entally (1821), pageant of a pioneer family, 1792–1912. Hobart: Scenery Preservation Board.
