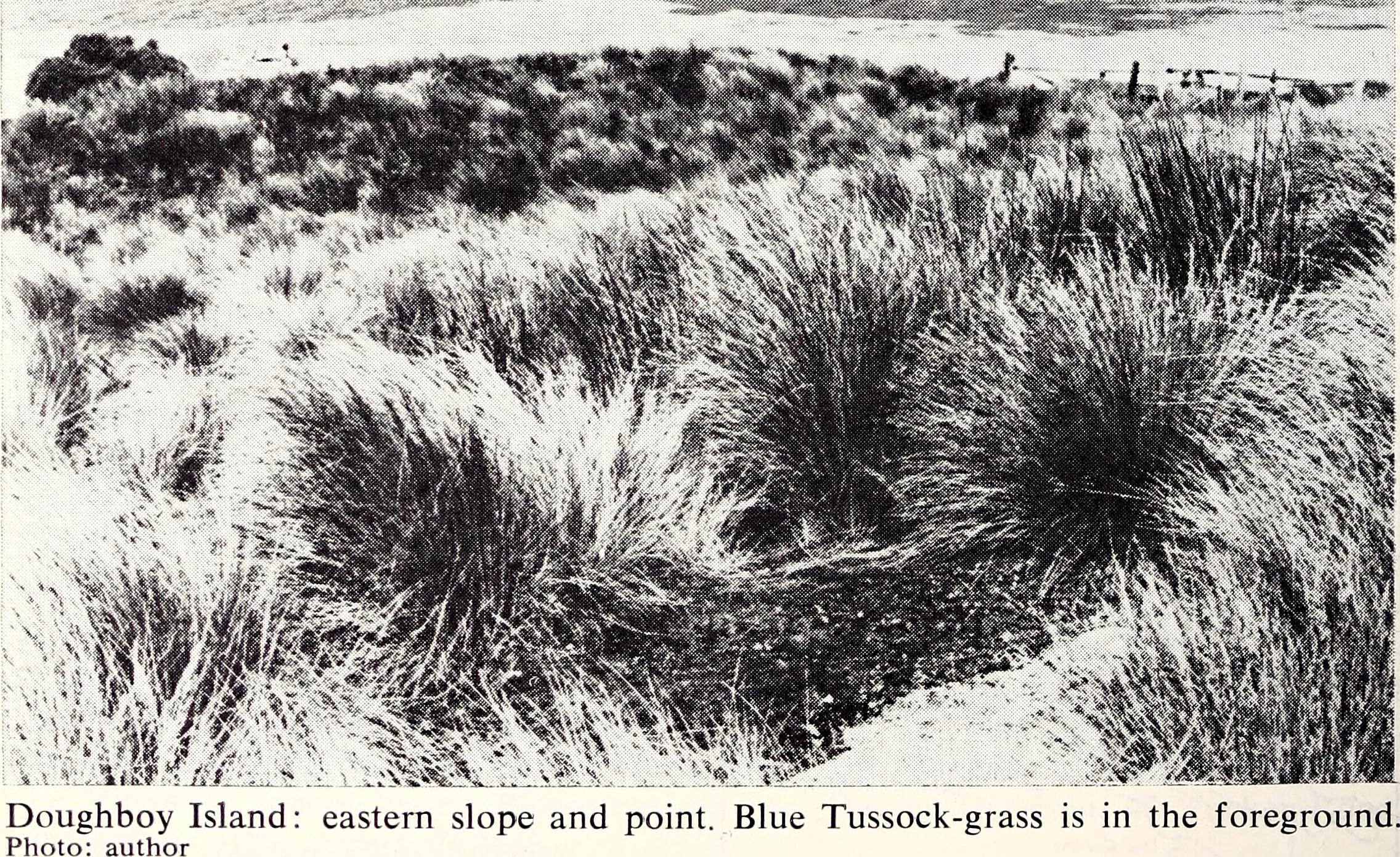

Scientific classification
- Kingdom: Plantae
- Clade: Tracheophytes
- Clade: Angiosperms
- Clade: Monocots
- Clade: Commelinids
- Order: Poales
- Family: Poaceae
- Subfamily: Pooideae
- Genus: Poa
- Species: P. poiformis

Binomial name
- Poa poiformis (Labill.) Druce

Synonyms
- Arundo poiformis Labill. (basionym); Poa australis R.Br. (nom. illeg.); Poa laevis R.Br.; Poa plebeia R.Br.

= Poa poiformis =

Species of plant

Poa poiformis, commonly known as coast tussock-grass or blue tussock-grass, is a densely tufted, erect, perennial tussock grass, with distinctive blue-green leaves, that grows to about 1 m in height. Its inflorescences are arranged in a dense panicle up to 30 cm long. It is native to coastal southern Australia where it occurs along ocean foreshores, estuaries, dunes and cliffs. P. poiformis is also found on Kangaroo Island (South Australia) and Lord Howe Island (New South Wales).

== Varieties ==
- Poa poiformis var. poiformis (autonym)
- Poa poiformis var. ramifer D.I.Morris – Trailing coast tussock-grass

Var. ramifer is currently being studied to determine if it is synonymous with var. poiformis
