= Lucy Beeton =

Australian Aboriginal teacher and businesswoman

Lucy Beeton (or Beadon; 14 May 1829 – 7 July 1886) was an Aboriginal Tasmanian schoolteacher, trader and Christian leader.

== Early life and family ==
Lucy Beeton was born on Gun Carriage Island, part of the Furneaux Group in the eastern Bass Strait, in what was then the colony of Van Diemen's Land, now Tasmania (Lutruwita). She and her family also lived on Badger Island.

Her father was Thomas Beeton, (Note: Alternatively Baden, Beadon, or Beedon aka Henry Beadon, James Herbert Beadon) who was descended from a London Jewish family and had been transported to Tasmania in 1817 after mutinying from the Royal Navy. After completing his sentence in 1824, he established himself as a sealer in Bass Strait. Aboriginal women on the islands were abducted and traded by sealers. In that way, Beeton traded for an Aboriginal woman, known as Bet Smith, to be his wife. Bet Smith, whose Palawa name was Emmerenna, had been abducted from Cape Portland as a child by John Harrington, a sealer, and had been "claimed" by Thomas Tucker, another sealer, after Harrington's death in 1824, who then "sold" her to Beeton. It is said that Beeton was devoted to his wife and children and did not treat Bet/Emmerenna as a servant as other sealers treated Aboriginal women.

In 1831, two years after Lucy Beeton was born, her father was forced to leave Gun Carriage Island so that George Augustus Robinson, the Protector of Aborigines, could establish an Aboriginal-only settlement. Lucy and her mother had to stay in the settlement on the island. However, Thomas Beeton then requested that his family be allowed to live with him, which was approved by the colony's Lieutenant-Governor, George Arthur. In the meantime, Robinson's settlement had been moved to Flinders Island, allowing the Beeton family to live on Gun Carriage Island.

== Career and faith ==
As Lucy Beeton grew older, she was taught by her father how to sail and do business, and was later sent to George Town and Launceston (on the Tasmanian mainland) to be tutored.

During her education on the mainland and later, Beeton made friends with influential Church of England (now Anglican) clergy such as Archdeacon Thomas Reibey and with their help, she established a school on both islands, petitioned the government to fund teachers and taught the local children herself. She was respected for her faithful commitment to Christianity and for her leadership, teaching both religious and secular studies and was rewarded for her work with a lifetime lease of Badger Island from 1877. The Anglican Bishop of Tasmania, Francis Russell Nixon, wrote in 1854 that Beeton was a great lady, everyone's friend, and that she was "High-minded, and earnest in her Christian profession, she has set herself to work to do good in her generation. From the pure love of those around her, she daily gathers together the children of the sealers, and does her best to impart to them the rudiments both of secular and religious knowledge." Canon Brownrigg had also visited Beeton and the islands and spoke highly of her.

She worked to reduce the effect of sealers preying on Bass Strait islanders and argued for compensation for Indigenous people who had been dispossessed of their lands. In 1872 she invited Truganini to make her home on Badger Island but this offer was not taken up.

Beeton was also well known at the time as being a trader and businesswoman. She became known as the "Queen of the Isle"' and the "commodore" By 1886 she owned her own cutter, "Bella Beeton" and sailed and traded in it with her brother Harry Beeton. She later ran her own sheep and cattle station on Badger Island. Stephen Murray-Smith called her, “the most notable personality produced by the second generation of islanders.”

Lucy Beeton never married but lived with her brothers, James and Henry and their families, in her homestead cottage on Badger Island where she welcomed many visitors and sang hymns. She died on Badger Island on 7 July 1886 and was buried there. News of her death was brought to Launceston on the mainland on 12 July 1886 by Captain Holt who arrived on a boat from Badger Island.

== Legacy ==
Lucy Beeton Crescent in Bonner, Australian Capital Territory and the Lucy Beeton Aboriginal teacher scholarship at the University of Tasmania are named after her.

A shell necklace made by her is held in the collection of the Tasmanian Queen Victoria Museum and Art Gallery.
