= Xanthoparmelia morrisii =

Scientific classification
- Kingdom: Fungi
- Division: Ascomycota
- Class: Lecanoromycetes
- Order: Lecanorales
- Family: Parmeliaceae
- Genus: Xanthoparmelia
- Species: X. morrisii

Binomial name
- Xanthoparmelia morrisii Elix & Kantvilas (2009)
- Holotype site: Coal River Gorge, Tasmania

Species of lichen

Xanthoparmelia morrisii is a species of saxicolous (rock-dwelling), foliose lichen in the family Parmeliaceae. Found in Tasmania, Australia, it was formally described by lichenologist John Alan Elix and Gintaras Kantvilas in 2009. The species epithet honours the Tasmanian botanist Dennis Ivor Morris.

== See also ==
- List of Xanthoparmelia species
