= Agfest =

Annual agricultural field day in Tasmania, Australia

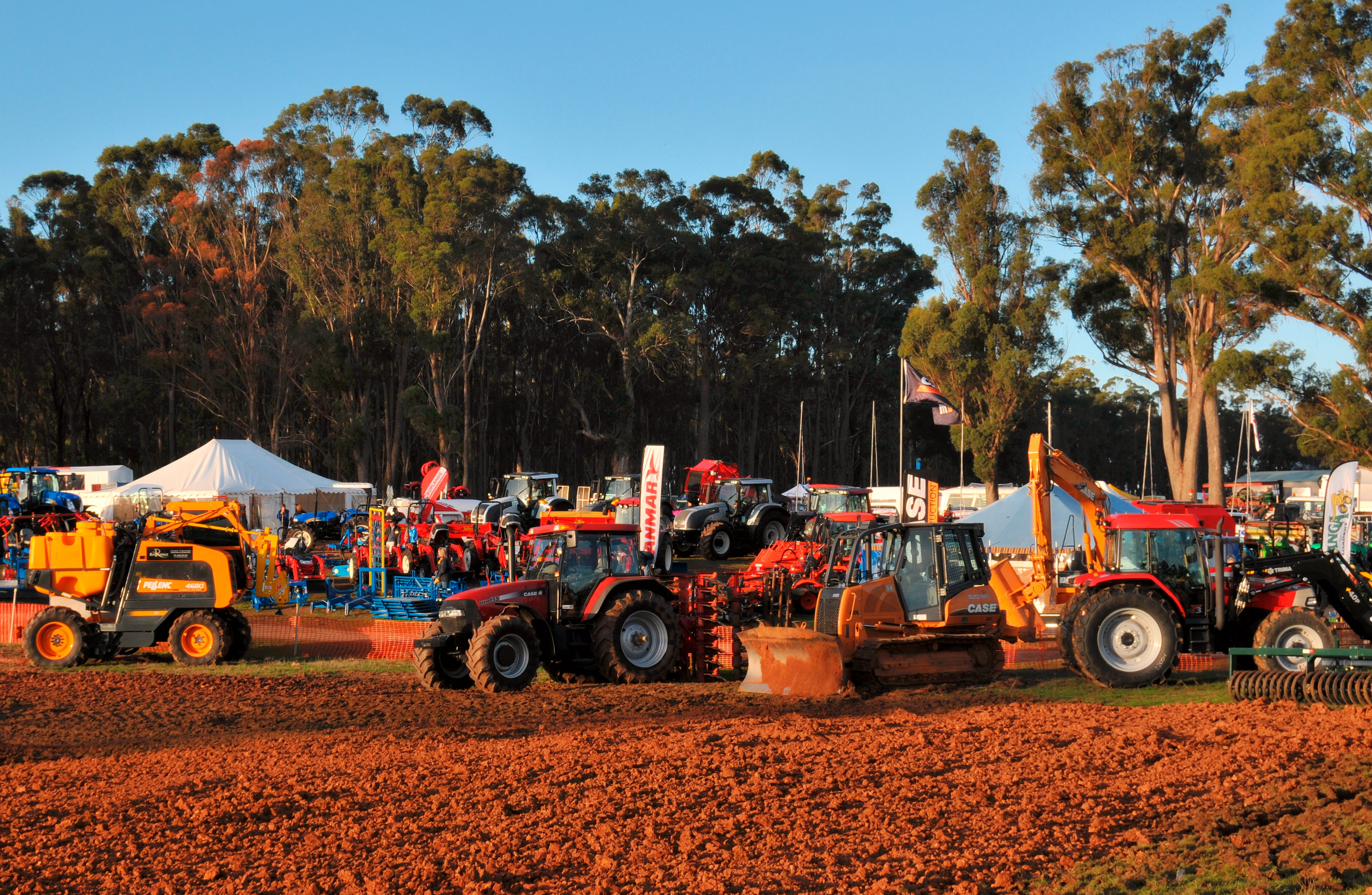
Agricultural machinery demonstration area at Agfest 2010

Agfest is an annual agricultural field day held in the Australian state of Tasmania. It was first held in 1983 and is run by the Rural Youth Organisation of Tasmania with profits assisting Tasmania Rural Counselling. It has grown to the state's largest single event and attracts up to 70,000 visitors during three days in May each year at the 200-acre (80 ha) site in rural Carrick.

The event was first held at Symmons Plains, near Perth, Tasmania in 1982. It was soon recognised by the organising committee that a larger site was required. In 1986, they purchased land on Oaks Road, Carrick from the Paterson family. The land had originally been part of "Oaks Estate" belonging to Thomas Haydock Reibey, father to Premier of Tasmania Thomas Reibey. The 229-acre (96-hectare) site was named "Quercus Rural Youth Park"; Quercus is the genus name for oak. The first Agfest field days on the new site ran from 7–9 May 1987. Up to A$25 million is contributed to the Tasmanian economy by Agfest.

COVID-19 impact

In 2020 Agfest was scheduled to start on 7 May. Due to the COVID-19 pandemic in Australia the usual 3 day physical event was cancelled in March 2020. It was replaced by the 3 week 'Agfest 2020 in the Cloud' online event that ran from 7–28 May, receiving 1,010,000 page views and 45,600 unique visitors. The online platform was financed by a A$65,000 grant from the Tasmanian Government.

Agfest 2021 included both physical events over 4 days (5–8 May), and an online component (8–15 May). COVID safety rules, an altered site layout and other steps were planned to help keep patrons safe. Tickets were only pre-sold online to allow contact tracing.

== See also ==
- List of events in Tasmania
