= Entally House =

Entally House Tasmania
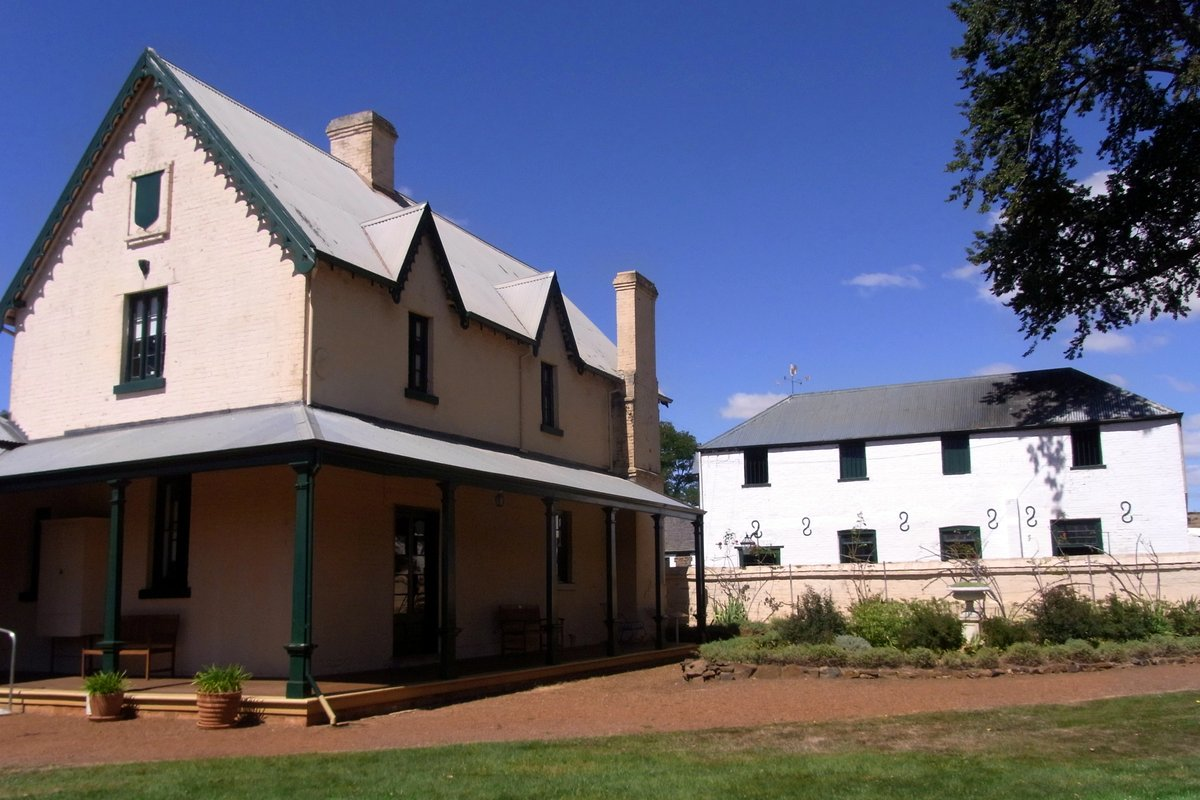

- Coordinates: 41°30.822′S 147°03.412′E
- Established: 1819

Entally House is a heritage-listed site in Hadspen, Tasmania. It was the family home of Thomas Reibey, who was the Premier of Tasmania from 1876 to 1877. The Entally Estate was established in 1819 by Thomas Haydock Reibey (senior). Reiby worked in the East India Company and named the house after the suburb of Entally in Calcutta, India.

In 1978, the house and its outbuildings were registered on the now-defunct Register of the National Estate.
