= Dennis Ivor Morris =

Australian botanist (1925–2005)

- Born: 16 May 1924; Tunbridge Wells, England
- Died: 27 July 2005 (aged 81); Hobart, Australia
- Citizenship: Australian
- Scientific career
- Fields: Botany
- Author abbrev. (botany): D.I.Morris

Dennis Ivor Morris (16 May 1924–27 July 2005) was a British-born Australian botanist.

== Early life and career ==
Dennis Ivor Morris, born on 16 May 1924, in Tunbridge Wells, England, had his formative education at the Worshipful Company of Skinners School. He received a comprehensive education, displaying a vast knowledge that spanned various fields including literature, history, and science.

Morris's early adulthood was marked by his service in the British and Indian armies from 1942 to 1947, where he reached the rank of Captain. After his military service, he engaged in forestry and farm work in England. In 1950, he moved to Australia, initially working on a sheep station in western Queensland. This was followed by a surveying job in British Columbia, Canada, before returning to Australia in 1952 to join the Hydro-Electric Commission of Tasmania as a surveyor.

Although he had no formal training in botany, Morris's interest and talent in the subject led him to a successful career in this field. He began as a park ranger at Mount Field for Tasmania's Scenery Preservation Board in 1954. He later managed the historic Entally House in Tasmania. In 1961, he joined the Tasmanian Department of Agriculture as a technical officer, where his responsibilities included the identification and control of agricultural weeds. This role allowed him to develop a deep understanding of Tasmania's introduced flora.

Morris's botanical career took a significant turn in the early 1970s when he partnered with renowned botanist Winifred Curtis. Their collaboration significantly contributed to the completion of the Students Flora of Tasmania, a fundamental handbook on Tasmania's flowering plants and conifers. Morris brought his expertise in weeds and monocotyledons to this project, as well as his skill in literature review and botanical nomenclature.

== Later years and contributions ==
After retiring from the Department of Agriculture in 1985, Morris devoted his time to the Tasmanian Herbarium as a volunteer. His vast knowledge and dedication were instrumental in the Herbarium's growth and success. He played an active role in various Herbarium activities, including plant identification classes and contributions to Australia's virtual herbarium. His gardening skills were also notable, with his home garden in Fern Tree being a celebrated location for 'Open Garden' events. Morris also advised the Australian Quarantine and Inspection Service and the Police Department on botanical matters relating to quarantine and forensics.

== Recognition and legacy ==
Morris's extensive contributions to Tasmanian botany were formally acknowledged when he was awarded an Honorary Doctor of Science degree by the University of Tasmania in December 2003. Despite battling illness in his later years, he remained actively involved in botany until his death on 27 July 2005. He died in Hobart, Tasmania.

Morris was honoured in the specific epithet of the lichen Xanthoparmelia morrisii.
