= Thomas Reibey =

Australian politician (1821–1912)

11th Premier of Tasmania
- In office 20 July 1876 – 9 August 1877
- Preceded by: Alfred Kennerley
- Succeeded by: Philip Fysh

Personal details
- Born: 24 September 1821 Hadspen, Van Diemen's Land
- Died: 10 February 1912 (aged 90) Launceston, Tasmania, Australia
- Spouse: Catherine Macdonald Kyle

Thomas Reibey (24 September 1821 – 10 February 1912) was an Australian politician and Premier of Tasmania from 20 July 1876 until 9 August 1877.

== Early life ==
Reiby was born in Hadspen, Van Diemen's Land, (now Tasmania) the son of Thomas Haydock Reibey and Richarda Allen, and a grandson of Mary Reibey. Reibey was educated at Trinity College, Oxford. His father died before he graduated and he returned to Tasmania. In 1843 Reiby was ordained by Bishop Francis Nixon.

== Missions to the islands of Bass Strait ==
Archdeacon Reibey was one of a number of the Anglican clergy in Tasmania who voyaged to the Bass Strait islands in the middle of the 19th century to minister to the spiritual needs of the islanders of Aboriginal descent. The first such voyage seems to have been that made by Bishop Francis Nixon in 1854.

The next such voyage, for which a record survives, was made by archdeacon Reibey in 1862. He was joined on the voyage by another cleric from northern Tasmania, the Reverend John Fereday (1813-1871) of George Town. They departed George Town on 17 March 1862, aboard a cutter of 10 tons with a crew of two seamen. During the cruise they called at Flinders Island and then Chappell Island, where the islanders had gathered from their various home islands for the annual mutton-bird harvest. When archdeacon Reibey conducted divine service here on Sunday, 23 March 1862, he had a congregation of over sixty people. Nine children were baptised during the service. Reibey and Fereday also visited Badger Island where they met Lucy Beadon. Archdeacon Reibey made subsequent voyages to the islands in 1862 and 1866. Cannon Marcus Brownrigg followed his example and made a series of similar voyages between 1872 and 1885.

== Political career ==
Reibey became the member for Westbury in the Tasmanian House of Assembly in 1874. He became the leader of the opposition in 1875, and was briefly premier between 1876 and 1877. He was later colonial secretary and speaker of the house. He held his seat in parliament for a total of 29 years. Reibey died on 10 February 1912 at the age of 90.

Political offices
Preceded by Alfred Kennerley	Premier of Tasmania; 1876–1877	Succeeded by Philip Fysh
Tasmanian House of Assembly
Preceded by Alfred Dobson	Speaker of the Tasmanian House of Assembly; 1887–1891	Succeeded by Nicholas John Brown
