= Francis Nixon (bishop) =

British Anglican bishop

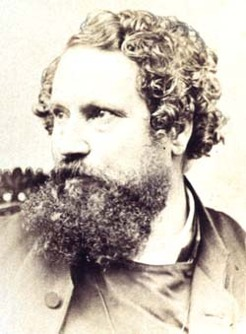
Bishop Francis Russell Nixon (1803–1879)

Francis Russell Nixon (August 1803 – 7 April 1879) was a British Anglican bishop who served as the first Bishop of Tasmania, Australia. See L. Robson, 'A History of Tasmania', Vol. I, OUP, Melbourne, 1983.

== Early life and ministry ==
Nixon was the son of Robert Nixon, a priest and amateur painter of North Cray, Kent. Nixon attended the Merchant Taylors school before studying at St John's College, Oxford, where he graduated with a Bachelor of Arts (BA) and subsequently Oxford Master of Arts (MA) and Doctor of Divinity (DD). He was ordained priest in 1827 (the year of his graduation).

== Bishop of Tasmania ==
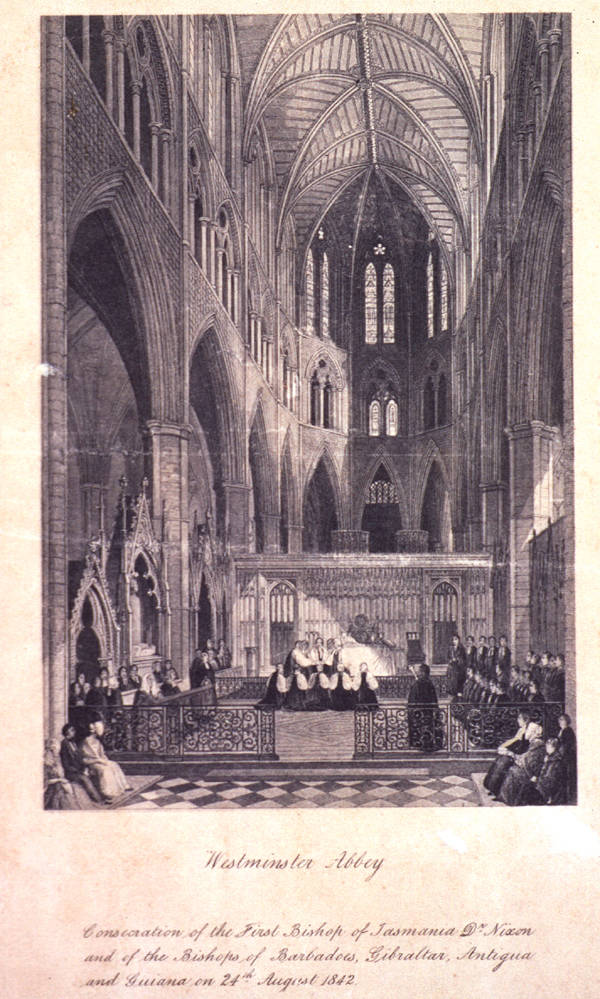
Nixon's consecration

On 24 August 1842, Nixon was consecrated a bishop at Westminster Abbey, to serve as the first Bishop of Tasmania, and arrived in the colony (then still called Van Diemen's Land) in June 1843.

== Artist and photographer ==
Like his father, Nixon was a painter. Early photographer Louisa Anne Meredith is remembered by John Watt Beattie in the 1880s showing him the "many specimens of both her own and the Bishop Nixon's photographic work in those early days of the very black art," and that she had been "instrumental in having the last remnant of the Tasmanian Aboriginals photographed for the purposes of science;" in March 1858, Nixon had made portraits of nine individuals belonging to the Oyster Cove group, photographs which remained relatively obscure until Beattie reproduced copies of them for the tourist industry, using his own name.

== Later life ==
Nixon died on 7 April 1879.

Anglican Communion titles
New office	Bishop of Tasmania; 1842–1863	Succeeded by Charles Bromby
