= Bishopsbourne, Tasmania =

Locality in Tasmania, Australia

Bishopsbourne
- Town
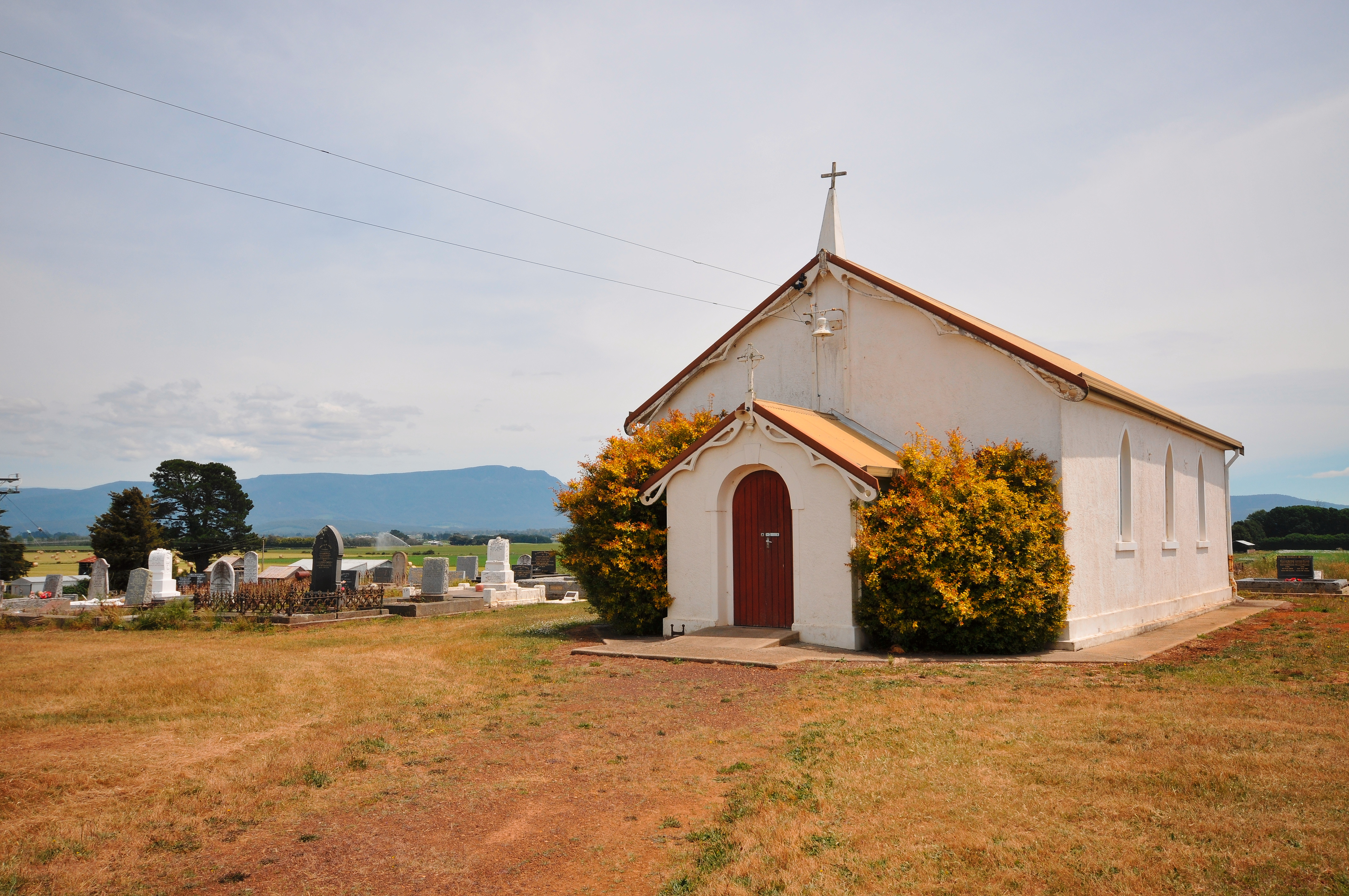
- The Anglican Church of the Holy Nativity, built in 1844 and opened 25 April 1845

- Coordinates: 41°37′S 146°59′E
- Country: Australia
- State: Tasmania
- Region: Central
- LGA: Northern Midlands
- Location: 198 km (123 mi) N of Hobart; 29 km (18 mi) SW of Launceston; 19 km (12 mi) SW of Longford
- Established: 1800s

Government
  - State electorate: Lyons
  - Federal division: Lyons

Population
  - Total: 136 (2016 census)
- Postcode: 7301
Localities around Bishopsbourne
Oaks	Carrick	Longford
Whitemore	Bishopsbourne	Toiberry
Cressy	Bracknell	Liffey

Bishopsbourne is an agricultural rural locality in the local government area (LGA) of Northern Midlands in the Central LGA region of Tasmania, which is about 19 kilometres (12 mi) south-west of the town of Longford. The 2016 census recorded a population of 136. Bishopsbourne holds historical significance for establishing Christ College, Australia's first tertiary education institution, and registered Tasmanian heritage sites, The Anglican Church of the Holy Nativity and cemetery.

== History ==
=== Indigenous history ===
For approximately 40,000 years, the traditional owners of these plains were the Panninher people of the Stoney Creek Nation, who lived on and shaped the lands for thousands of years with their own law, customs, language, cosmology, and farming. The Panninher clan set-up numerous mountain rockshelter camps within the tiered mountains known as taytitikithika, and used the river tilapangka as a pathway.

=== Colonial settlement ===
In 1821, the invading British colonial government settled and granted land in the district to released convicts, farmers, and colonists. Families began constructing homes, convict-quarters, and farms. Bushrangers were known to come down from the mountains to rob homesteads such as Enfield mansion. The Panninher people, who had already suffered from European diseases, resisting takeover of their country, and settler harassment, were dispossessed and displaced by the land grants.

With a name meaning 'bishop's villa by the stream,' Bishopsbourne's colonial boundaries were established in 1848. Notable early settlers included William Field (1774–1837), a former convict who became a prominent pastoralist and horse racing enthusiast, owner of the Enfield estate. William Webb (1792–1868), also a former convict, ran the "Bush Inn" from 1844, once advertised as Tasmania’s most profitable hotel. The premises later operated as the local store, post office, telephone exchange and now a private residence. The Bishopsbourne Post Office opened on 31 December 1846 (closed in 1976).

==== Establishment of Christ College ====
In 1846, Australia's oldest tertiary institution, Christ College, was established in Bishopsbourne by Bishop Francis Nixon (1803–1879), Tasmania's first Anglican bishop. Modelled after Oxford and Cambridge, at its peak 110 students (all male and Anglican) studied at the College. The grounds contained a chapel, hall, library, museum, and cricket oval, where the first games of Rugby football were played in Australia.

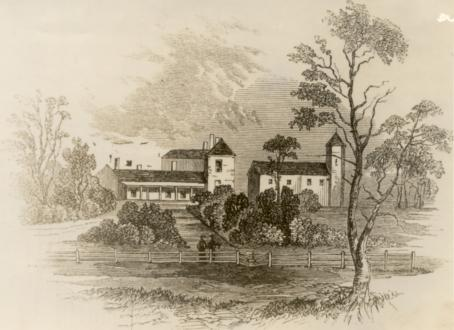
Christ College, Bishopsbourne (1856) Tasmania. H Butler Stoney. Libraries Tasmania: LPIC147-1-116

One notable student of Christ College was Henry Grant Lloyd, a prolific 19th-century Australian landscape painter. Lloyd was purportedly declined ordination by Bishop Nixon because of his homosexuality. Many sketches and water-paintings survive of the college and township. The school closed in 1856, after an inquiry into the educational and financial condition of the school, which recommended moving the college to Hobart.

=== Modern era ===
By 1904, the district was known as an agricultural town, and was still connected with a local railway station on the Western Line. The township had a methodist church, state school, police station, blacksmith, and a coffee palace (once known as the pub and hotel the Bush Inn).

In 1918, a soldiers avenue row of trees were planted in the township, which was attended and set in the ground by Tasmanian Premier Lee and his wife.

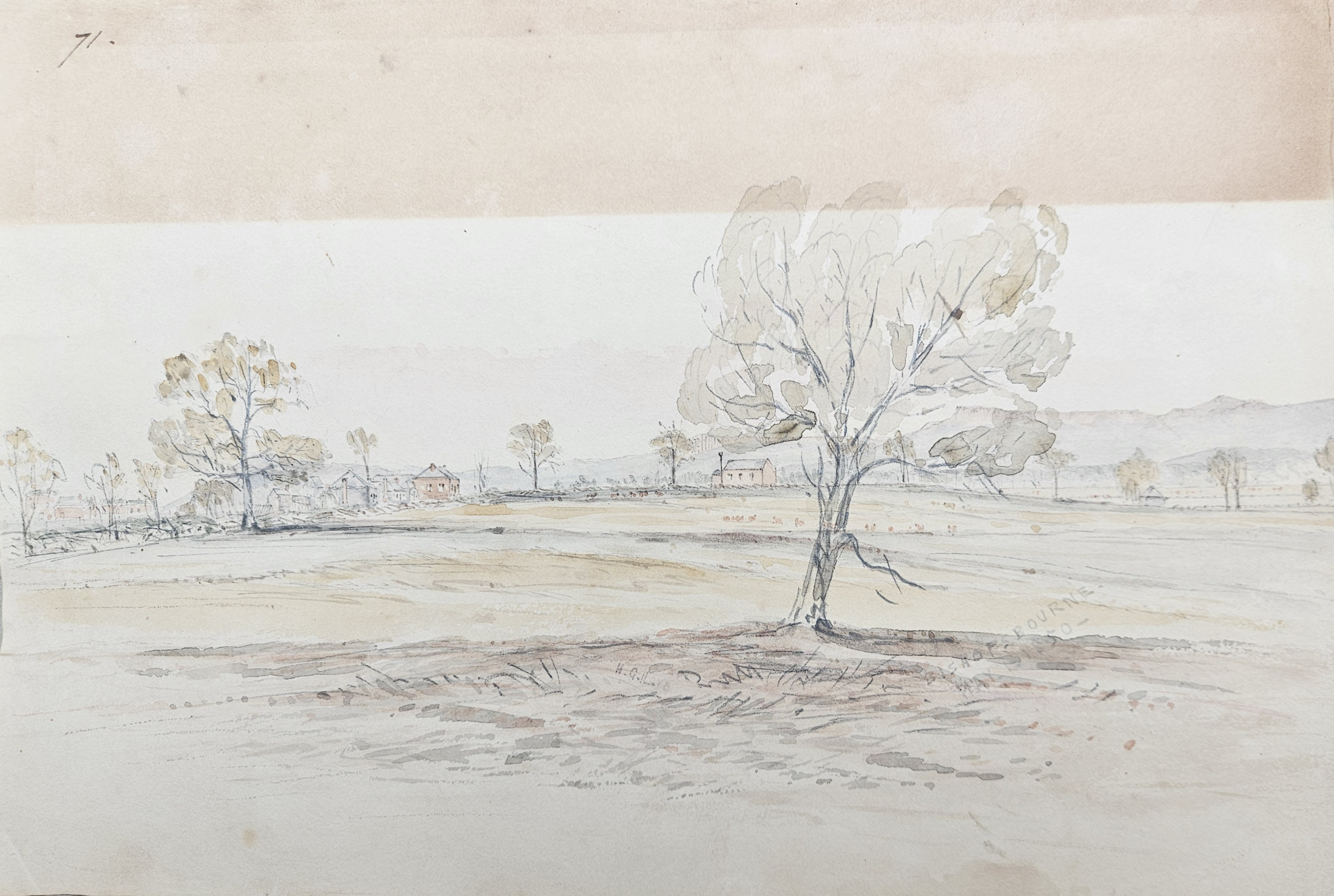
Bishopsbourne 1850, Tasmania (VDL), Watercolour. HG Lloyd.

In 1941, athlete Mick Goss set a world professional two-mile running record of 9 minutes 11.4 seconds. In 1946, the Longford Council purchased land in Bishopsbourne to establish a community hall and new recreation grounds for cricket and football, completed by 1947, and moving away from the old college grounds.

The township’s cricket team has participated in local competitions for approximately 70 years, reflecting the sport’s long-standing community importance. Bishopsbourne was gazetted as a locality in 1966. The area has experienced increased residential development, though no commercial enterprises have been established within the township.

== Geography and environment ==
Bishopsbourne lies in Tasmania’s Midlands region and historically featured extensive native grasslands. The district is now predominantly used for agricultural purposes, with farms and grazing lands. The climate exhibits Tasmania’s warmest summers and some of the coldest winters, often accompanied by frost. The Liffey River forms the western boundary of the locality, providing water resources and natural habitat.

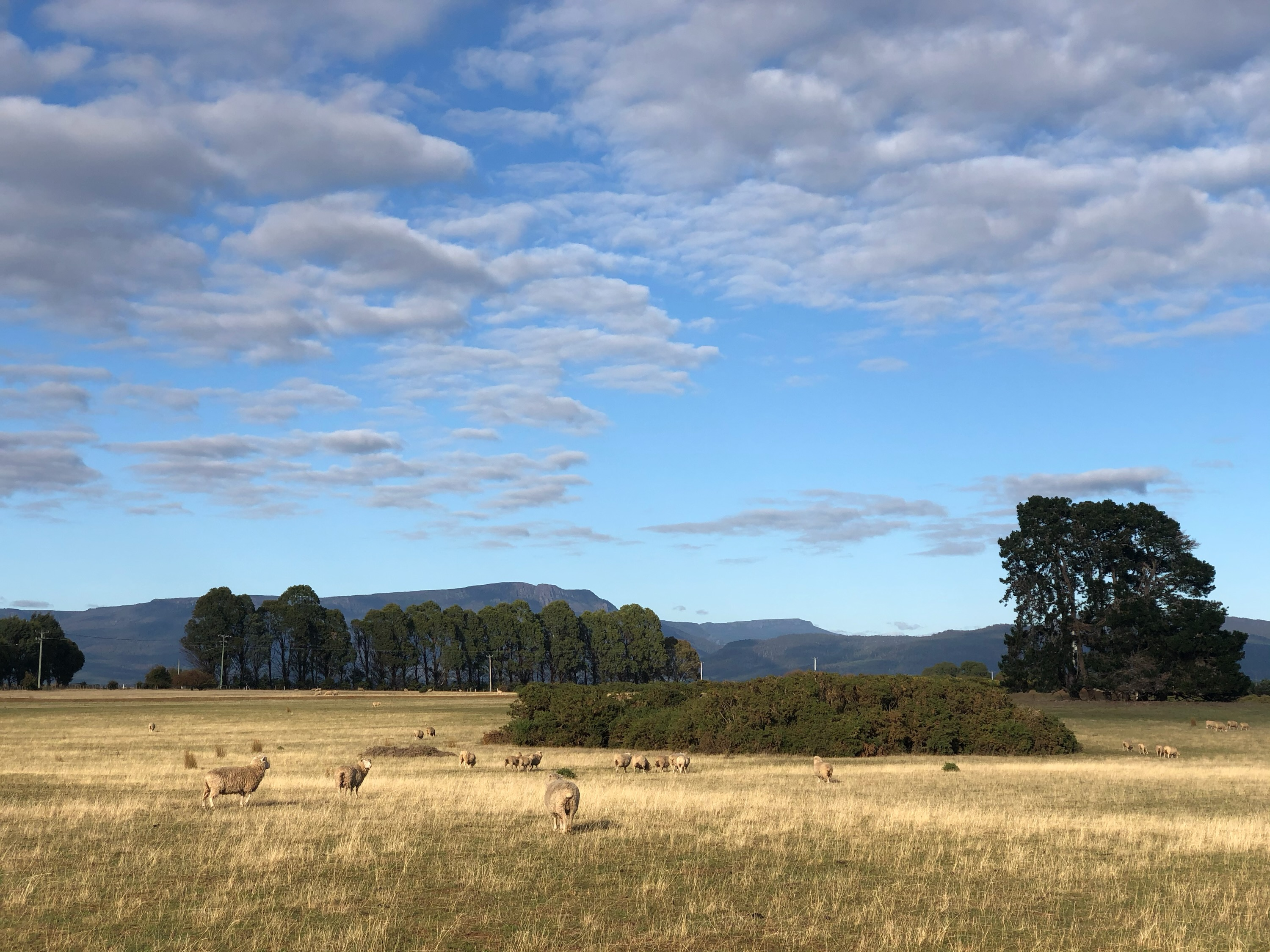
Sheep in the paddock of Pindari farmlands, Bishopsbourne, Tasmania.

== Road infrastructure and transportation ==
Bishopsbourne is accessible via Route C513 (Liffey Road / Bishopsbourne Road), which runs south to north through the locality. Route C518 branches east from C513. The nearest railway station, formerly on the Western Line, no longer operates passenger services.

Public transport services are limited, and residents primarily rely on private vehicles for access to larger centres like Longford and Launceston. The nearest bus route is the 796 service (Launceston to Cressy) operated by Tassielink.

== Notable people ==
- William Field (1774–1837): Convict-turned-pastoralist; owner of Enfield estate and horse racing enthusiast.
- Elizabeth Field (née Richards) (1784–1847): Early convict and original land grantee in Bishopsbourne.
- George Briscoe Skardon (1786–1850): Royal Navy lieutenant and early settler.
- William Webb (1792–1868): Former convict and proprietor of the Bush Inn (from 1844).
- Bishop Francis Nixon (1803–1879): First Anglican Bishop of Tasmania; founder of Christ College.
- Rev. John Philip Gell (1816–1898): Warden of Christ College; Cambridge-educated clergyman.
- Henry Grant Lloyd (1830–1904): Noted 19th-century Australian landscape painter; student of Christ College.
- Mick Goss (1914–2001): Athlete; set world professional two-mile record in 1941.
- Aunty Judith-Rose Thomas (1952– ): Tasmanian Aboriginal elder and artist.

== Gallery ==
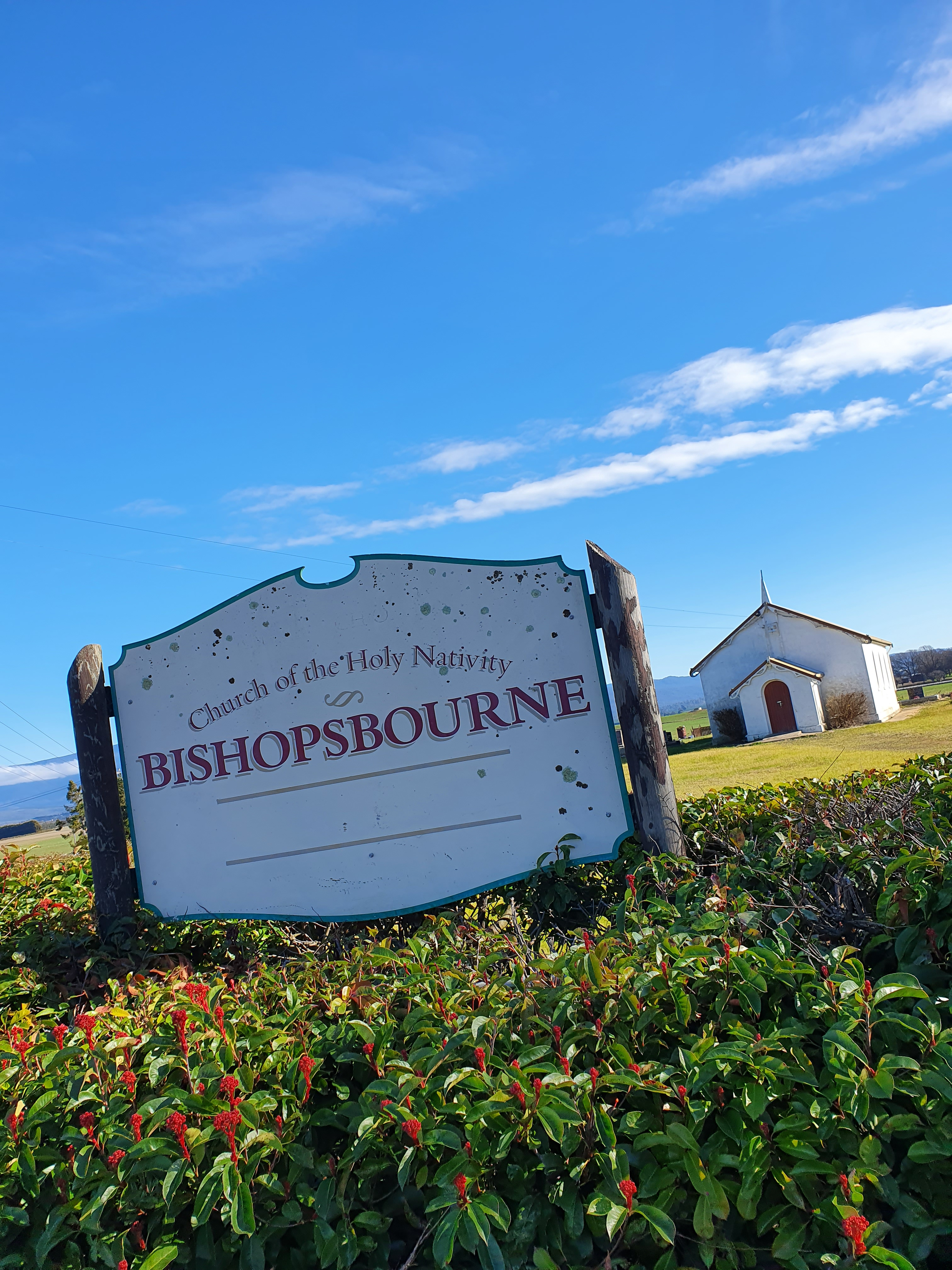
Church of the Holy Nativity, Bishopsbourne

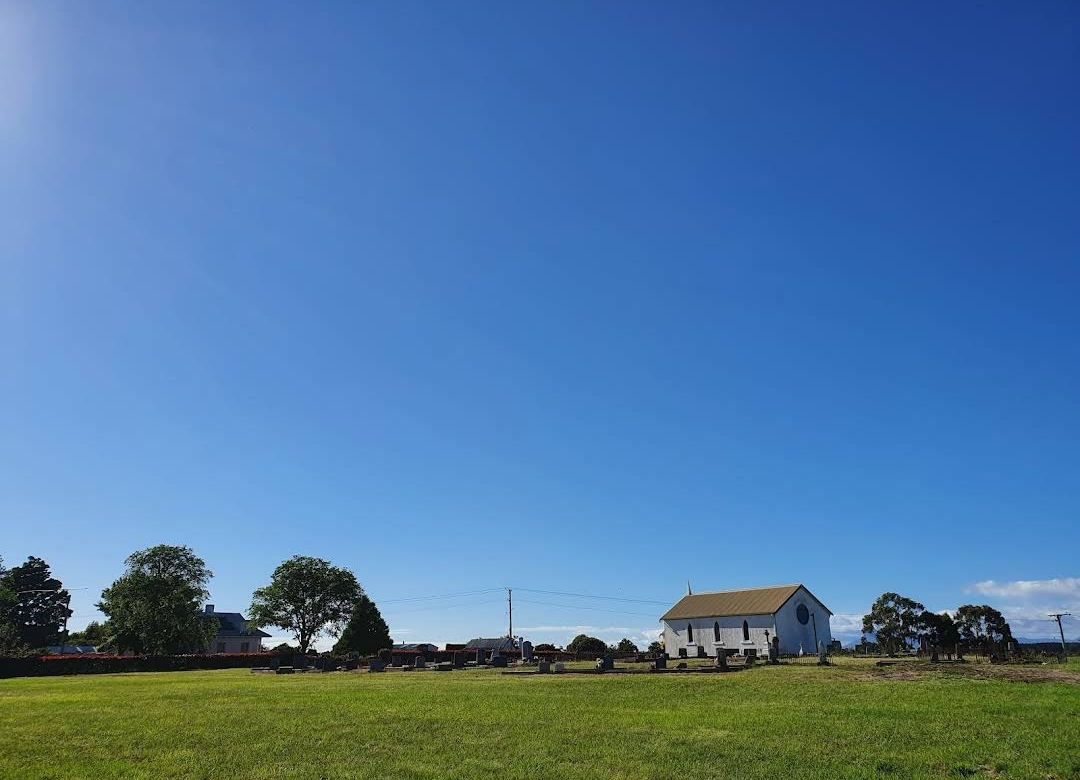
Field of the Church of the Holy Nativity, Bishopsbourne

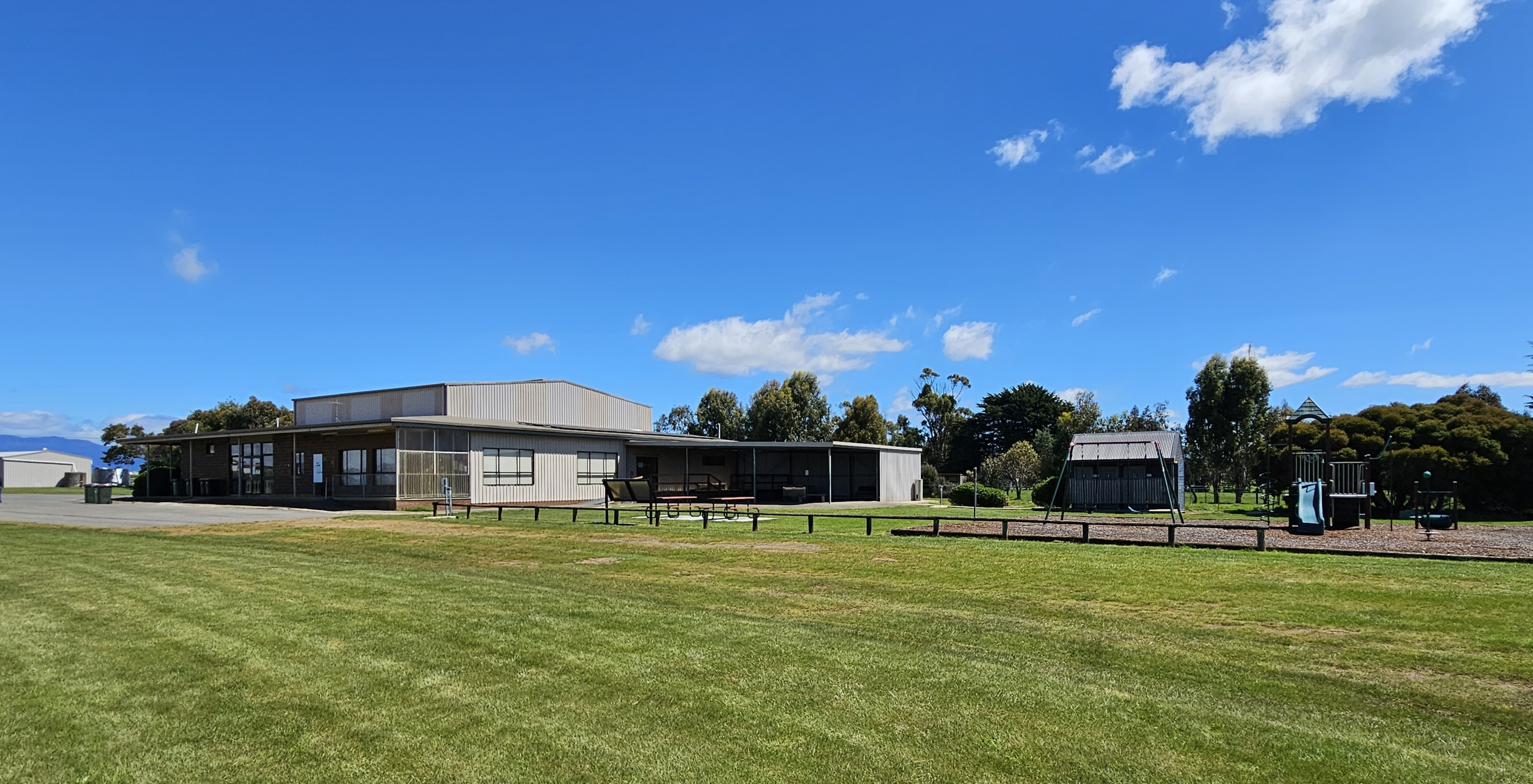
Bishopsbourne Community Centre Recreation Grounds
