= Misses Jane and Mary Hampson =

Two sisters: Australian artists

Jane Hampson
- Born: October 13, 1873; Osmaston, Tasmania, Australia
- Died: April 10, 1950 (aged 76); Australia
- Known for: Co-creator of the Westbury Quilt

Mary Hampson
- Born: June 26, 1868; Osmaston, Tasmania, Australia
- Died: 1944 (aged 75–76); Australia
- Known for: Co-creator of the Westbury Quilt

Misses Jane and Mary Hampson are considered the joint creators of the Westbury Quilt, an historic quilt created in the folk art tradition, depicting everyday life in the rural farming community of Westbury, Tasmania, Australia.

== The Hampson family ==
Named after the regional Tasmanian town of Westbury, the historic quilt was created by sisters Mary Hampson (26 June 1868 – 1944) and Jane Hampson (13 October 1873 – 10 April 1950), possibly with the assistance of other family members such as sister Hannah (died 18 October 1952) over the years 1900 to 1903. They were the unmarried daughters of farmer John Hampson and Mary Ann Parker, and the granddaughters of emancipated convicts.

== Biography ==
The Hampsons were a long-established farming family, living on the farm "Fernbank" at Osmaston, outside of Westbury towards the Great Western Tiers. There were seven siblings and it is likely only one ever married. As no descendants were able to be traced, the quilt eventually passed through the hands of a Westbury neighbour, Mary Gray, who had assisted the last Hampson sibling in his later years. She did not have wall space to display it, so gave it to the Misses Genevieve and Myra Fitzpatrick, who hung it on the wall of their historic hostelry, the Fitzpatrick Inn, located on the Bass Highway at the eastern entrance to Westbury.

== Quilt provenance ==
The Westbury Quilt is an historic quilt, completed in a domestic setting by two sisters from the Hampson family. Assistance may have come from a third sister Hannah, or other members of the family.

The red cotton fabric could have been dyed at home, as the natural bright red colour known as turkey red or madder red comes from rubia tinctorum, an introduced plant. Construction of the quilt included patchwork, appliqué, embroidery, and piece work, with many delicate and intricate stitches. The quilt would have been created by gaslight or candle-light, as electricity did not arrive in the district until the late 1920s. The completed size is 223.0 h x 191.0 w cm and it is backed with pink flannelette.

There are a number of panels with dates. The earliest panel with a date is the central motif featuring Queen Victoria, with the embroidered words "Good Queen Victoria", surrounded by "a floral garland representing the Empire", dated 1900. The latest dated panel is 28 December 1903, but it is not known in what order the individual patches were worked. The scalloped edge is a series of floral shapes, finely stitched and added as a border on the completion of the front of the quilt, probably after the flannelette backing had been added.

The panels depict scenes from the farming life of the Hampson family and the nearby villages. There are loved cows with the names "Polly" and "Kitty" and a pair of horses named "Bell" and "Colin". A thirteen-hour clock bears the words "Lost time is never found again".

The individual patches are rich with homilies, cautionary tales, theological virtues and proverbs, and "exhortations to decorous moral and social behaviour". These include:

- "when a woman throws herself at a man's head, she seldom hits the mark"
- "Don't spoil good tea in the making"
- "Faith, Hope and Charity"
- "Better to work and fail than to sleep one's life away"

The quilt was displayed on the wall of the Fitzpatrick Inn in Westbury until the late 1980s. It was then not seen for a number of years. When it was discovered, it was found in a room with a dead rat on the centre. Against the wishes of many local residents who believed the quilt should have been kept in community ownership and on display locally, the quilt was sold privately, acquired for the national collection by the National Gallery of Australia, with the assistance of the Australian Textiles Fund 1990.

== Legacy ==
The quilt was included in the national touring exhibition Everyday Art: Australian Folk Art which "celebrated the glories of everyday objects". Included in the tour was the Tasmanian Museum and Gallery in Hobart in 1999. At the time, it was called the "Hampson Quilt". It was also featured as the cover art of The Oxford Companion to Australian Folklore, edited by Gwenda Beed Davey and Graham Seal. The text, which was published in 1993, was described as a "milestone in the scholarship of Australian folklore." The inclusion of the Westbury Quilt on the cover (as well as the 'Bobs' kangaroo patch on the spine) highlights the significance of the quilt. It is described within the text as "an unsurpassed example of folk art."

To celebrate the 100th anniversary of the creation of the Westbury Quilt, the craftswomen of the towns of Westbury, Hagley and Whitemore joined to create a new quilt. Named the "Millennium Quilt", it is now on permanent display at the Meander Valley Council Chambers in Westbury. Many of these craftswomen, as well as local townspeople, resent the quilt's sale to the National Gallery of Australia, as they believe it should be held locally, and permanently on display.
