= Oaks, Tasmania =

Oaks Tasmania
- Coordinates: 41°35′47″S 146°57′39″E
- Population: 36 (2016 census)
- Postcode(s): 7303
- Location: 16 km (10 mi) SE of Westbury
- LGA(s): Meander Valley
- Region: Launceston
- State electorate(s): Lyons
- Federal division(s): Lyons
Localities around Oaks:
Whitemore	Carrick	Carrick
Whitemore	Oaks	Bishopsbourne
Whitemore	Bracknell, Whitemore	Bishopsbourne

Oaks is a rural locality in the local government area (LGA) of Meander Valley in the Launceston LGA region of Tasmania, Australia. The locality is about 16 kilometres (9.9 mi) south-east of the town of Westbury. The 2016 census recorded a population of 36 for the state suburb of Oaks.

== History ==
Oaks was gazetted as a locality in 1968.

== Geography ==
The Liffey River forms the eastern boundary. The Western Railway Line passes through from east to west.

== Road infrastructure ==
Route C511 (Oaks Road) passes through from north to south.
