= William Field (Australian pastoralist) =

Australian pastoralist and meat contractor

William Field (Snr.) (c. 1774 – 1837) was a convict turned pastoralist, meat contractor, and publican in Van Diemen's Land (now Tasmania, Australia).

== Early life ==
Born in Enfield, near London in about 1774, Field began his working life as a farmer and butcher. In 1800, at the age of 26, he was convicted of receiving nine stolen sheep from his brother, Richard and in 1806 was transported to the then newly established colony of Van Diemen’s Land, now Tasmania. Leaving behind a wife, Sarah, and an infant daughter, Ann (whom he would never see again) Field travelled en route to Launceston on the Fortune to Sydney and then the Sophia to Port Dalrymple. After Field's sentence ended in 1814 he went on to lease land, purchase cattle and supply meat to the colony.

== Career ==
By the time his 14-year sentence had been completed Field had already proven himself useful to the new colony as a farmer and merchant. As a free man he continued acquiring land and cattle and by 1820 had become the main supplier of meat for the Launceston region.

By 1828, Field was running 3,000 head of cattle and 2,000 sheep between Longford and Westbury. This had increased to 10,000 cattle by the 1830s, by which time he had enough of a monopoly to be known as the ‘Cattle King of Van Diemen’s Land’.

Field's property holding also increased in the 1820s and 1830s including his acquisition of Enfield (1,040 acres) at Bishopsbourne, Westfield (1,640 acres) and Roxford (2,470 acres) at Westbury, and Eastfield (2,200 acres) and Woodfield (2000 acres) at Cressy. Further town properties were purchased, and as a result, Field reportedly owned one-third of the land and buildings in central Launceston at one time. By one estimate, around his death in 1837 Field owned over 16,000 acres (65 km^{2}) of land, and had amassed had a fortune that ranked him - as proportion of Australia’s GDP - as the 7th richest Australian, and richest Tasmanian, ever to have lived.

== Personal life ==
Field's partner was Elizabeth Richards, who herself had been a convict. Richards had been sentenced to death in 1806 for stealing cotton and lace but her sentence had been commuted to transportation for life. Together they had five children, William (1816–??) (married Sarah Lucas, 1839), Thomas (1817–??) (married Elizabeth Lindsay, 1847), Richard (born 1820 who died seven weeks later), John (1821–??) (married Mary Anne Lindsay, 1854), and Charles (1826–??) (married Margaret Eddington, 1848).

William Field Snr. died in Launceston aged 63 in 1837, survived by four sons. Field's son Thomas had a daughter who would go on to become the famed woodcarver, Ellen Nora Payne.
