= Ellen Nora Payne =

Australian woodcarver (1865–1962)

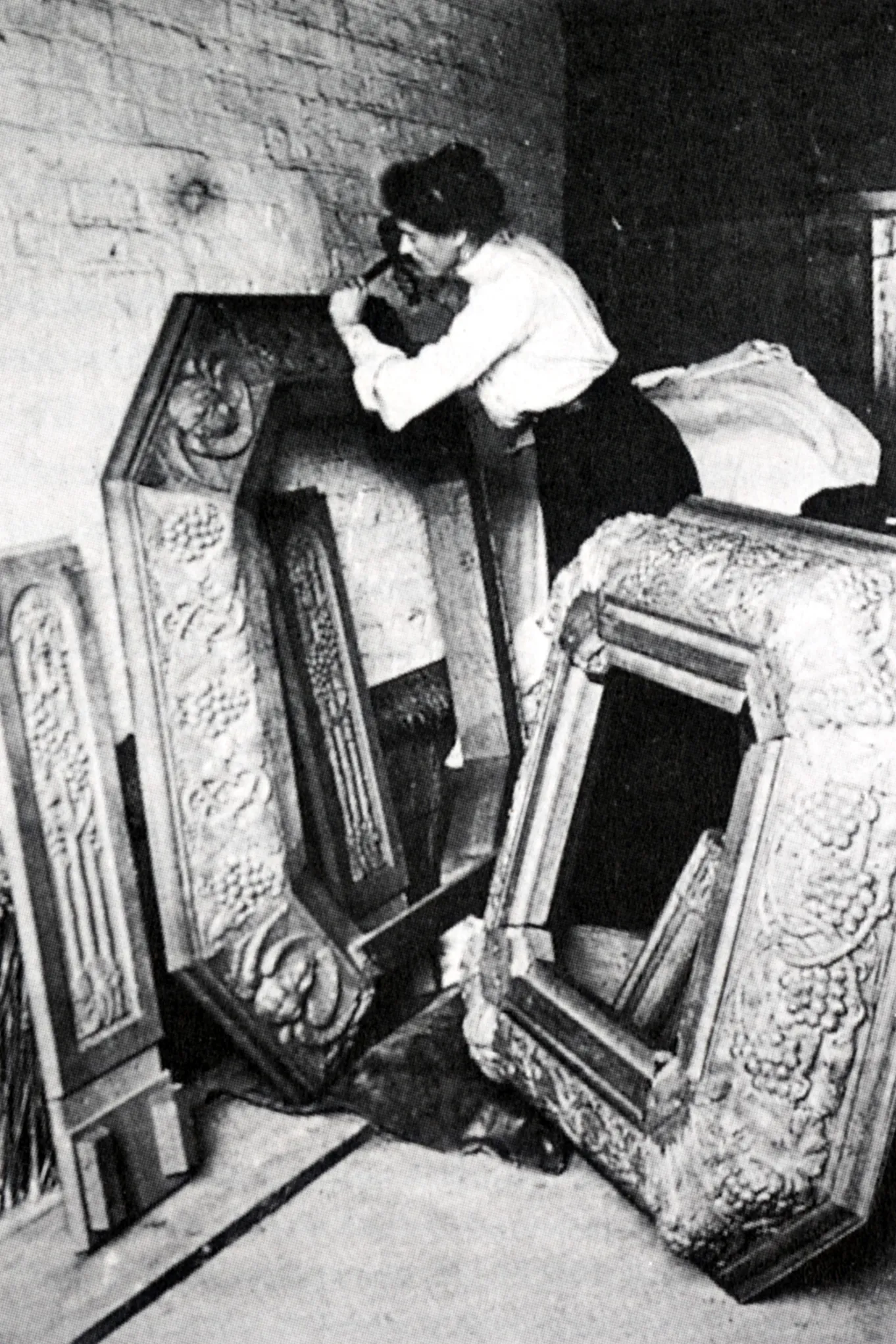
- Payne in 1905
- Born: Ellen Nora Field; 7 January 1865; Westbury, Tasmania, Australia
- Died: 31 January 1962 (aged 97); Hobart, Tasmania, Australia
- Known for: Woodcarving
- Relatives: William Field (grandfather)

Ellen Nora Payne (née Field; 7 January 1865 – 31 January 1962) was an Australian woodcarver.

== Early life and education ==
Payne was born on 7 January 1865, in a house called "Westfield", in Westbury, Tasmania. Her parents were Elizabeth (born Lindsay) and Thomas William Field. She was the twelfth of their fourteen children and she had at least seven sisters including Ethelwyn Field who was a (less productive) wood carver. Her family called her Nellie. Her father was a farmer and a politician and her grandfather, William Field, had been a convict turned wealthy landowner.

From 1891, Payne was able to take lessons from the Prussian-born woodcarver Robert Prenzel in Melbourne where her husband of four years had moved his practise.

In 1899, she and her husband, Charles Alexander Payne, moved to London and there she was able to study wood carving. She enrolled at the University of London's Goldsmiths' College and the South Kensington School of Art where she studied a wide range of craft skills including wood carving until she returned to Tasmania in 1906.

== Career ==
In 1907, she submitted a carved oak china cabinet that won three prizes at the prestigious women's work exhibition in Melbourne. It won a silver medal and five pounds in one category as well as two other class wins. The other wood carving entrants included Sarah Squire Todd and Dora Walch who were also from Tasmania. One of the other entrants was Maude Baillie from Wedge Island in South Australia.

In 1925, one of Payne's sons accidentally drowned and her husband died.

In 1938, Payne created a chancel screen for the church where she had married, St Andrew's Church, Westbury. The screen was poignantly named "the seven sisters screen" for her seven sisters who had, by then, died.

In the 1950s, Payne assisted in the restoration of London's very old church All Hallows-by-the-Tower which had been damaged during World War II.

== Death and legacy ==
Payne died in Hobart, on 31 January 1962, aged 97. She is believed to be the only one of the Tasmanian woodcarvers to have had a biography written about them. In 2015, there was an exhibition of 70 of her pieces of work in Westbury that had been organised locally.
