= Golden Valley, Tasmania =

Golden Valley
- Town
- Coordinates: 41°38′16″S 146°42′57″E
- Country: Australia
- State: Tasmania
- Region: Launceston
- LGA: Meander Valley
- Location: 59 km (37 mi) SW of Launceston

Government
  - State electorate: Lyons
  - Federal division: Lyons

Population
  - Total: 231 (2016 census)
- Postcode: 7304
Localities around Golden Valley
| Meander | Quamby Brook | Quamby Brook |
| Meander | Golden Valley | Cluan |
| Jackeys Marsh | Liffey | Liffey |

Golden Valley is a rural locality in the local government area of Meander Valley in the Launceston region of Tasmania. It is located about 59 kilometres (37 mi) south-west of the town of Launceston. The 2016 census determined a population of 231 for the state suburb of Golden Valley.

== History ==
Golden Valley was gazetted as a locality in 1968.

== Geography ==
The watershed of the Cluan Tiers forms the north-eastern boundary.

== Road infrastructure ==
The A5 route (Highland Lakes Road) passes through from north-west to south, where it forms part of the south-east boundary. The C502 route (Golden Valley Road / Bogan Road) starts at an intersection with A5 and runs east, then north, where it exits. The C504 route (an extension of Bogan Road) starts at an intersection with C502 and runs south-east before exiting.
