= Quamby Brook =

- Town
- Coordinates: 41°35′26″S 146°42′08″E
- Country: Australia
- State: Tasmania
- Region: Launceston
- LGA: Meander Valley
- Location: 54 km (34 mi) SW of Launceston

Government
  - State electorate: Lyons
  - Federal division: Lyons

Population
  - Total: 106 (2016 census)
- Postcode: 7304
Localities around Quamby Brook
Deloraine	Osmaston	Osmaston
Meander	Quamby Brook	Cluan
Meander	Golden Valley	Golden Valley

Quamby Brook is a rural locality in the local government area of Meander Valley in the Launceston region of Tasmania. It is located about 54 kilometres (34 mi) south-west of the town of Launceston. The 2016 census determined a population of 106 for the state suburb of Quamby Brook.

== History ==
Quamby Brook was gazetted as a locality in 1968.

== Geography ==
The watershed of the Cluan Tiers forms part of the north-eastern boundary.

== Road infrastructure ==
The C502 route (Bogan Road) passes through from north to south. The C503 route (Quamby Brook Road) starts at an intersection with C502 and runs to the north-west corner, where it exits.
