= Bracknell, Tasmania =

Bracknell
- Town
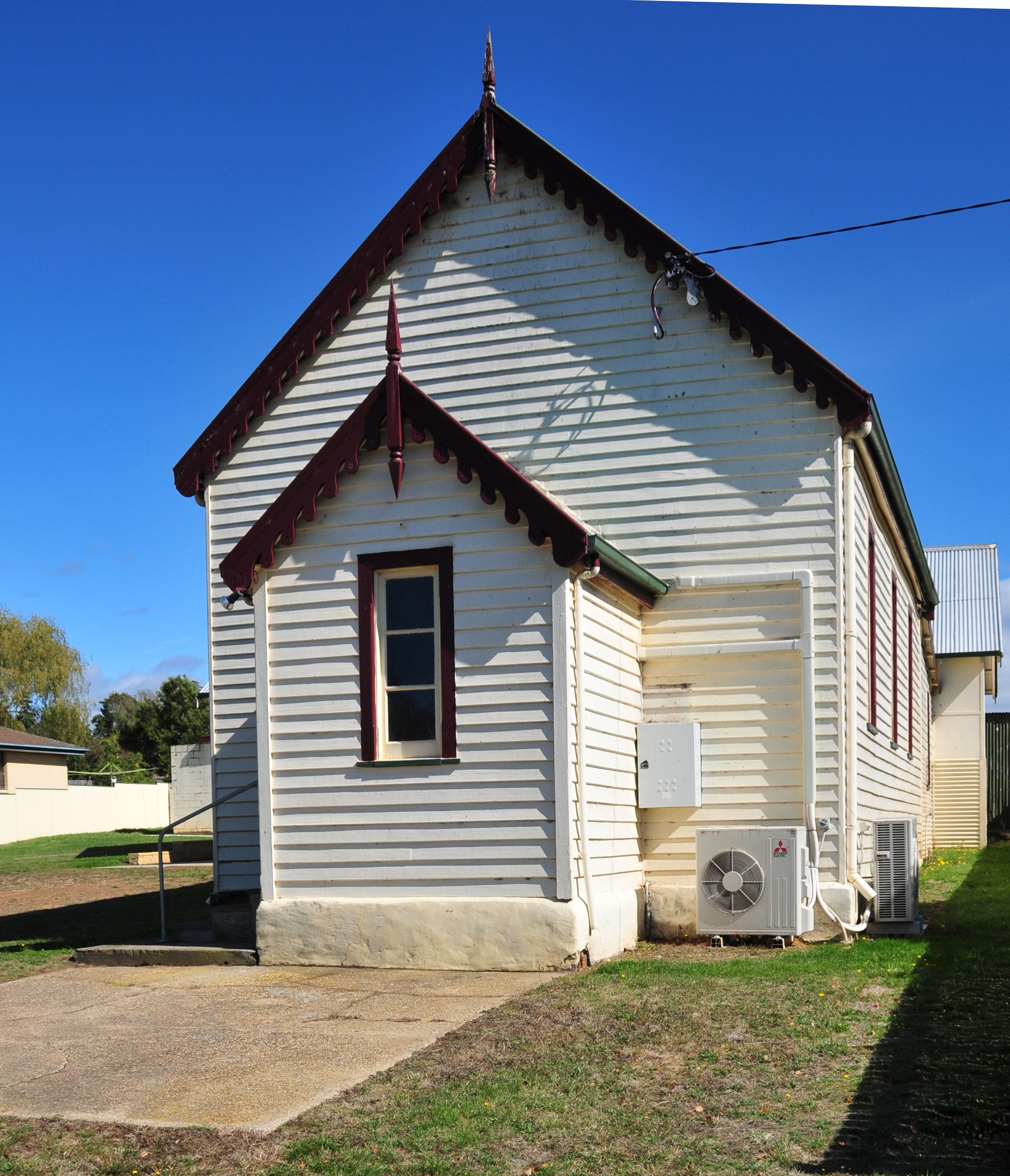
- Mountain Views community church

- Coordinates: 41°39′S 146°56′E
- Country: Australia
- State: Tasmania
- Region: Launceston, Central
- LGA: Meander Valley, Northern Midlands
- Location: 202 km (126 mi) N of Hobart; 33 km (21 mi) SW of Launceston; 15 km (9.3 mi) W of Cressy; 22 km (14 mi) SE of Westbury

Government
  - State electorate: Lyons
  - Federal division: Lyons

Population
  - Total: 459 (2016 census)
- Postcode: 7302
- Mean max temp: 21.5 °C (70.7 °F)
- Mean min temp: 7.9 °C (46.2 °F)
- Annual rainfall: 832.5 mm (32.78 in)
Localities around Bracknell
Cluan	Whitemore, Oaks	Bishopsbourne
Cluan, Liffey	Bracknell	Bishopsbourne, Cressy
Liffey	Liffey, Blackwood Creek	Blackwood Creek, Cressy

Bracknell is a rural locality and town in the local government areas of Meander Valley and Northern Midlands in the Launceston and Central regions of Tasmania. The locality is about 22 kilometres (14 mi) south-east of the town of Westbury. The 2016 census recorded a population of 459 for the state suburb of Bracknell.

It was established to serve the needs of the forestry industry but is now a centre for the local farming community.

== History ==
The township of Bracknell was surveyed prior to 1859, at which time an auction of town blocks was held, but only became established in the early 1870s. By 1874 there was a church, two school buildings, a hotel and several other buildings. The town's land had formerly been owned by the Church of England. All the streets in Bracknell have been given female names, a curiosity that dates from when the town was laid out. The current hotel has been in operation since 1880, originally as the Enfield Hotel. The post office opened on 1 August 1872.

The first Methodist services in the town were held in a barn around November to December 1863. As the congregation grew a church was needed and so the foundation stone for a Primitive Methodist chapel was laid on 14 October 1864. This first church was later removed so the current building could be constructed on its site. A parsonage was added in 1902, the year of the Methodist union that formed the Methodist Church of Australasia. The present church's foundation stone was laid 4 April 1922 and it was opened the same year at a cost of 1250 pounds. The church became part of the Uniting Church in Australia in 1977 and remains in use. The foundation stone of an Anglican church, St James, was laid December 1931 and the church consecrated April 1932. When opened the church was part of the Church of England parish of Cressy. St James' was later closed and the Diocese of Tasmania sold it in 2011. Bracknell was gazetted as a locality in 1968.

== Geography ==
The Liffey River forms part of the southern boundary, flows through from south-west to north-east, and then forms part of the eastern boundary.

== Road infrastructure ==
Route C511 (Oaks Road) enters from the north and runs south to the town, where it ends. Route C513 (Liffey Road / Bracknell Lane / Louisa Street / Maria Street / Bracknell Road) enters from the north-east, runs west through the town, and then west and south to the south-west corner, where it exits. Route C505 (Cluan Road) starts at an intersection with C513 and runs north-west until it exits. Route C514 (a continuation of Liffey Road) starts at an intersection with C513 and runs south-west until it exits.

== Town and agriculture ==
Bracknell is a rural area with mixed farming enterprises. There are no major businesses in town so people have to travel for employment. The town itself is bounded on the east by the Liffey River. The town has a store, service station, post office, two halls, and a hotel. Its economy is based on mostly dairy, livestock, and poppy (Papaver somniferum) production for the Tasmanian opium poppy industry.

Bracknell primary school has pupils from, grades 1 through 6. The school became an area school in 1950 and in the 1960s educated pupils through to grade 9. A football club was first formed in 1899. The town's Australian rules football club, the Redlegs, began playing sometime after World War I and played in the Esk Football Association and the Esk Deloraine Football Association, winning three grand finals. They joined the Northern Tasmanian Football Association in 1998, and play in the association's first division. Cricket has been played in the town since at least 1883 and a team, as of 2015, plays in the amateur Northern Midlands Cricket Association.

Bracknell is in the Meander Valley Council local government area, the state Division of Lyons, the federal Division of Lyons and the state Legislative Council division of McIntyre.

== Bibliography ==
- Greenhill, Virginia (2002). In the blink of an eye. Westbury: Westbury historical society.
- The centenary of the Bracknell Methodist Church, Tasmania, 1863-1963. Bracknell: Bracknell Methodist Church. 1963.
- Henslowe, Dorothea (1978). Our heritage of Anglican churches in Tasmania. Moonah, Tasmania: Mercury-Walch. ISBN 090962514X.
- Rait, Basil (1974). The sporting history of Westbury, 1823-1973. Westbury: Westbury Council.
