= Cluan =

- Town
- Coordinates: 41°35′30″S 146°50′52″E
- Country: Australia
- State: Tasmania
- Region: Launceston
- LGA: Meander Valley
- Location: 40 km (25 mi) SW of Launceston

Government
  - State electorate: Lyons
  - Federal division: Lyons

Population
  - Total: 39 (2016 census)
- Postcode: 7303
Localities around Cluan
Osmaston	Westbury	Westbury
Quamby Brook, Golden Valley	Cluan	Whitemore
Liffey	Bracknell	Whitemore

Cluan is a rural locality in the local government area of Meander Valley in the Launceston region of Tasmania. It is located about 40 kilometres (25 mi) south-west of the town of Launceston. The 2016 census determined a population of 39 for the state suburb of Cluan.

== History ==
Cluan was gazetted as a locality in 1968.

== Geography ==
The watershed of the Cluan Tiers forms the south-western boundary.

== Road infrastructure ==
The C505 route (Cluan Road) passes through from north-east to south-east. The C510 route (Glenore Road) starts at an intersection with C505 and exits to the north-east.
