= Blackwood Creek, Tasmania =

Blackwood Creek
- Town
- Coordinates: 41°44′S 146°54′E
- Country: Australia
- State: Tasmania
- Region: Central
- LGA: Northern Midlands
- Location: 31 km (19 mi) SW of Longford
- Established: 1862

Government
  - State electorate: Lyons
  - Federal division: Lyons
- Elevation: 300 m (980 ft)

Population
  - Total: 120 (2021 census)
- Postcode: 7301
- Mean max temp: 15 °C (59 °F)
- Mean min temp: 5 °C (41 °F)
- Annual rainfall: 949 mm (37.4 in)
Localities around Blackwood Creek
| Liffey | Bracknell, Liffey | Cressy |
| Central Plateau | Blackwood Creek | Cressy |
| Central Plateau | Central Plateau, Cressy | Cressy |

Blackwood Creek is a rural locality in the local government area (LGA) of Northern Midlands in the Central LGA region of Tasmania. The locality is about 31 kilometres (19 mi) south-west of the town of Longford. The 2021 census recorded a population of 120 for the state suburb of Blackwood Creek. It is a small community at the base of the Great Western Tiers in Tasmania. Nearby towns include Poatina, Liffey, Bracknell, Cressy and Miena.

== History ==
Blackwood Creek was gazetted as a locality in 1968.

Blackwood Creek Post Office opened in 1884 and closed in 1974.

Blackwood Creek Primary School opened in 1880 and closed in 1947. The Baptist Church opened in 1874 and closed in 1991 and a community church was opened in 2000.

== Geography ==
Westons Rivulet and Brumbys Creek flow through from west to east.

== Road infrastructure ==
Route C514 (Blackwood Creek Road) passes through from east to north.
