= Poatina, Tasmania =

Coordinates: 41°47′S 146°58′E

Poatina
- Town
- Country: Australia
- State: Tasmania
- LGA: Northern Midlands
- Location: 60 km (37 mi) from Launceston; 25 km (16 mi) from Cressy

Government
  - State electorate: Western Tiers, Lyons
  - Federal division: Lyons
- Elevation: 299 m (981 ft)

Population
  - Total: 96 (2016 census)
- Postcode: 7302
Localities around Poatina
Blackwood Creek	Cressy	Cressy
Blackwood Creek	Poatina	Cressy
Cressy	Cressy	Cressy

Poatina (derived from an indigenous word for "cave") is a town in Tasmania, Australia 60 km south of Launceston. The Western Tiers mountain range surrounds Poatina.

Poatina Village was constructed in the 1960s to house the work force of the Poatina Power Station, which was commissioned in 1964. Hydro Tasmania sold the village in 1995 to Fusion Australia, an Australian Christian not-for-profit youth and community organisation. In 2010, Poatina was described as "a tightly knit Christian community".

As of 2014, the Poatina Chalet was part of a resort area owned by Fusion Australia. At that time, Poatina was home to a Golden Chain Motel, Mountain View Restaurant, a metal fabrication workshop, a hot glass studio, a golf course, a private school, and an artists' community. As of 2020, Poatina had "streets...lined with 1950s houses," "a general store, a petrol pump and even a phone box". There is no longer any school operating in Poatina.

The 2016 census offered a snapshot of Poatina's small size. It recorded the town's population at just 96 people.

In 2025 the Poatina community agreed on new by-laws, removing any reference to religious ethos. It expects this could open the tiny town up to grow and hopefully change public perception. In an intreview in 2025 a resident stated its just a normal town with normal people.
