= Cressy, Tasmania =

Cressy
- Town
- Coordinates: 41°41′S 147°05′E
- Country: Australia
- State: Tasmania
- LGA: Northern Midlands Council
- Location: 186 km (116 mi) N of Hobart; 35 km (22 mi) S of Launceston; 11 km (6.8 mi) S of Longford

Government
  - State electorate: Lyons
  - Federal division: Lyons
- Elevation: 148 m (486 ft)

Population
  - Total: 1,111 (2016 census)
- Postcode: 7302
- Mean max temp: 18.2 °C (64.8 °F)
- Mean min temp: 5.8 °C (42.4 °F)
- Annual rainfall: 592.8 mm (23.34 in)

Cressy is a small town 35 kilometres (22 mi) south-west of Launceston, Tasmania. It came into existence in the 1850s to service the surrounding wheat farms. At the 2006 census, Cressy had a population of 670. It is known as Tasmania's "Trout capital" for the good fishing in the area. It is also home to an extensive agriculture research facility for the Tasmanian Institute of Agricultural Research.

Cressy Post Office opened on 17 September 1856.

Nearby towns include: Bishopsbourne, Bracknell, Liffey, Blackwood Creek, Poatina and Longford.

== History ==
Cressy was established as the main centre for the Cressy Company. The Cressy Company's first director Captain Bartholemew Boyle Thomas chose to name company after the Battle of Crecy in the 14th Century, at which one of his ancestors fought. The Cressy Company also known as the "Cressy Establishment", was a large agricultural company which owned a significant portion of the Norfolk Plains. The first building in Cressy was The Cressy Hotel built in 1845 by William Brumby. Cressy became an official township in 1848. Much of the land in the area was owned by the O'Connor family, founded by Irish migrant Roderic O'Connor.

An Anglican theological college, St Wilfrid's, was located in Cressy from 1904 to 1929.

Brumby's Creek, the Weirs, the Macquarie Lake and the Liffey rivers serve as a popular trout fishing spot. The annual Tasmanian Trout Expo is hosted in Cressy.

=== Climate ===
Cressy possesses an inland oceanic climate (Köppen: Cfb) with tepid summers and cool winters. The town is quite cloudy, experiencing an average of 59.6 clear days and 153.1 cloudy days per annum. Extreme temperatures have ranged from 41.4 °C (106.5 °F) on 30 January 2009 to −9.4 °C (15.1 °F) on 24 June 1972.

Climate data for Cressy (41.73°S 147.08°E, 148 m (486 ft) AMSL) (1965-2022)
Month	Jan	Feb	Mar	Apr	May	Jun	Jul	Aug	Sep	Oct	Nov	Dec	Year
Record high °C (°F)	41.4 (106.5)	36.0 (96.8)	34.4 (93.9)	27.9 (82.2)	21.8 (71.2)	17.7 (63.9)	16.7 (62.1)	19.0 (66.2)	22.0 (71.6)	26.6 (79.9)	31.6 (88.9)	37.0 (98.6)	41.4 (106.5)
Mean daily maximum °C (°F)	25.4 (77.7)	24.9 (76.8)	22.6 (72.7)	18.3 (64.9)	14.8 (58.6)	12.3 (54.1)	11.8 (53.2)	12.9 (55.2)	14.9 (58.8)	17.3 (63.1)	20.5 (68.9)	23.0 (73.4)	18.2 (64.8)
Mean daily minimum °C (°F)	10.5 (50.9)	10.5 (50.9)	8.5 (47.3)	5.7 (42.3)	3.6 (38.5)	1.9 (35.4)	1.6 (34.9)	2.5 (36.5)	3.9 (39.0)	5.2 (41.4)	7.3 (45.1)	8.6 (47.5)	5.8 (42.5)
Record low °C (°F)	−0.1 (31.8)	−1.0 (30.2)	−2.5 (27.5)	−5.4 (22.3)	−6.3 (20.7)	−9.4 (15.1)	−6.4 (20.5)	−6.6 (20.1)	−4.8 (23.4)	−4.9 (23.2)	−2.0 (28.4)	−2.2 (28.0)	−9.4 (15.1)
Average precipitation mm (inches)	38.8 (1.53)	29.3 (1.15)	45.0 (1.77)	42.3 (1.67)	48.2 (1.90)	57.6 (2.27)	62.5 (2.46)	63.6 (2.50)	56.3 (2.22)	53.6 (2.11)	49.4 (1.94)	42.0 (1.65)	592.8 (23.34)
Average precipitation days (≥ 0.2 mm)	6.2	7.3	7.5	9.3	14.0	15.3	16.6	16.8	13.4	11.5	9.5	9.0	136.4
Average afternoon relative humidity (%)	41	41	44	56	64	71	70	66	62	56	52	44	56
Average dew point °C (°F)	8.4 (47.1)	8.9 (48.0)	8.1 (46.6)	7.6 (45.7)	7.0 (44.6)	6.0 (42.8)	5.4 (41.7)	5.5 (41.9)	6.0 (42.8)	6.6 (43.9)	8.5 (47.3)	7.5 (45.5)	7.1 (44.8)
Mean monthly sunshine hours	285.2	248.6	217.0	180.0	133.3	111.0	127.1	155.0	186.0	229.4	237.0	260.4	2,370
Percentage possible sunshine	62	64	57	50	44	40	43	48	52	56	55	56	52
Source: Bureau of Meteorology (1999-2022) Sunshine, June record low (1939-2021)
