= Liffey Falls =

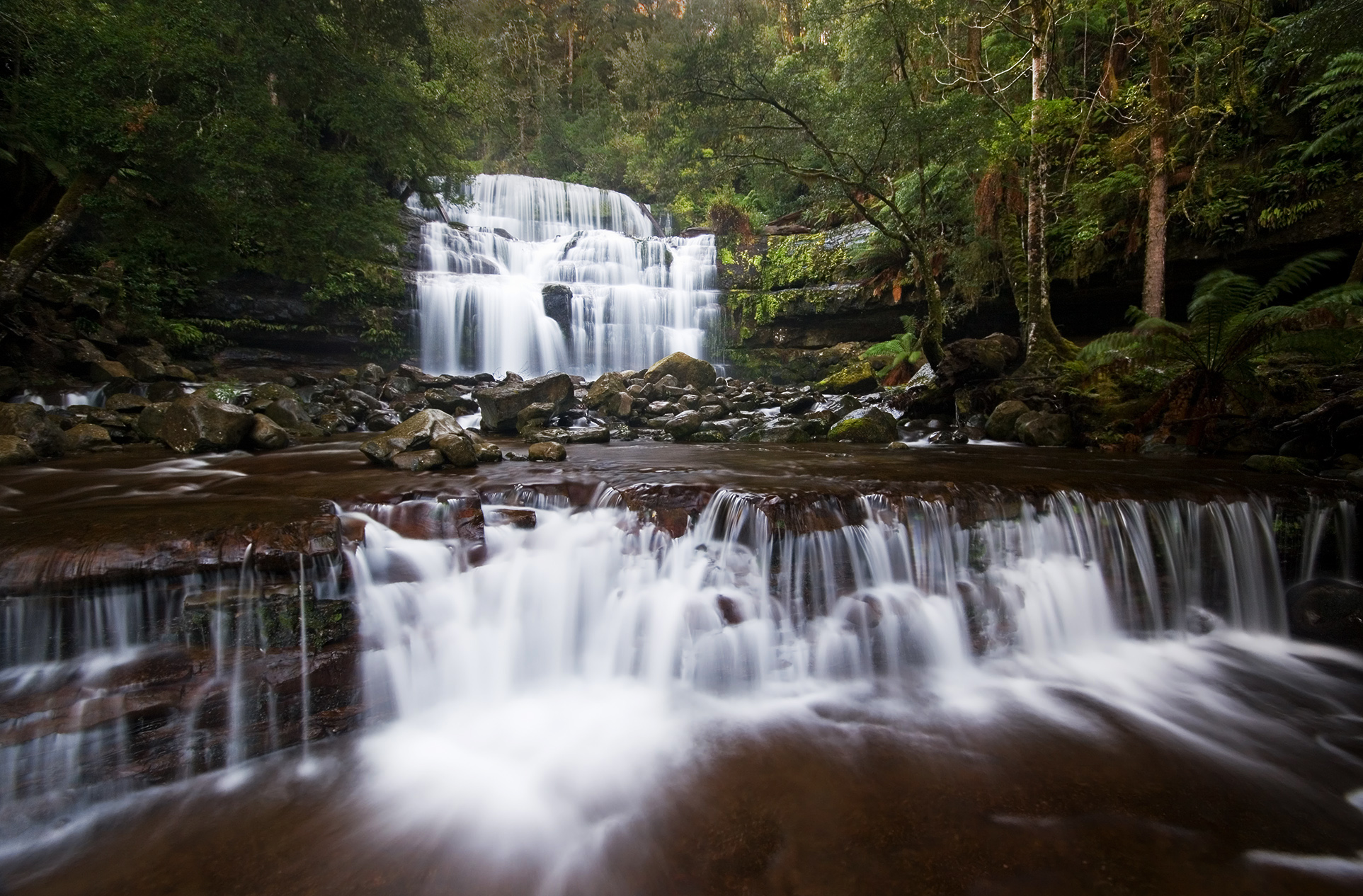
- Liffey Falls

- Location within Tasmania
- Location: Midlands, Tasmania, Australia
- Coordinates: 41°41′53″S 146°45′52″E
- Type: Tiered–cascade
- Elevation: 514 metres (1,686 ft) AHD
- Total height: 120–160 metres (390–520 ft)
- Number of drops: 4
- Watercourse: Liffey River

The Liffey Falls, a series of four distinct tiered–cascade waterfalls on the Liffey River, is located in the Midlands region of Tasmania, Australia. The falls are a significant massacre site where 30–60 Aboriginal people were murdered in a reprisal killing for the killing of the stockman William Knight by Aboriginal people.

== Location and features ==
The Liffey Falls are situated upstream of the town of Liffey, in Meander Valley, accessible from Deloraine via the Lake Highway. The falls commence from the Great Western Tiers at an elevation of 514 metres (1,686 ft) above sea level and descend in the range of 120–160 metres (390–520 ft). Each of the tiered cascades is named in order from upstream to downstream; Alexandra Falls, Hopetoun Falls, The Leap or Spout Falls (also called the Albert Falls), and Victoria Falls.

Walking tracks lead to the falls from both upstream (tourist carpark), and downstream.

== Ethnology-history of the area ==
The area surrounding Liffey Falls was a meeting place for Tasmanian Aboriginal peoples for thousands of years prior to the colonisation of Australia. The Liffey River was originally called Tellerpangger by the Panninher clan who occupied the area.

== Liffey Falls Massacre ==
In 1827 a significant massacre of up to sixty of the Pallittorre clan by European colonists took place during the Black War. The massacre with sixty dead or wounded is reported in The Sydney Morning Herald as happening at Liffey Falls. Colonial Times and Tasmanian Advertiser reporting on 6 July 1827 (page 4, The Natives) on a dispatch from Launceston does not explicitly mention Liffey Falls and refers to Quamby's Bluff when it notes:

"They were surrounded whilst sitting round their fires, when the soldiers and others fired at them when about 30 yards distant. They report that there must be about sixty of them killed and wounded."

== Gallery ==
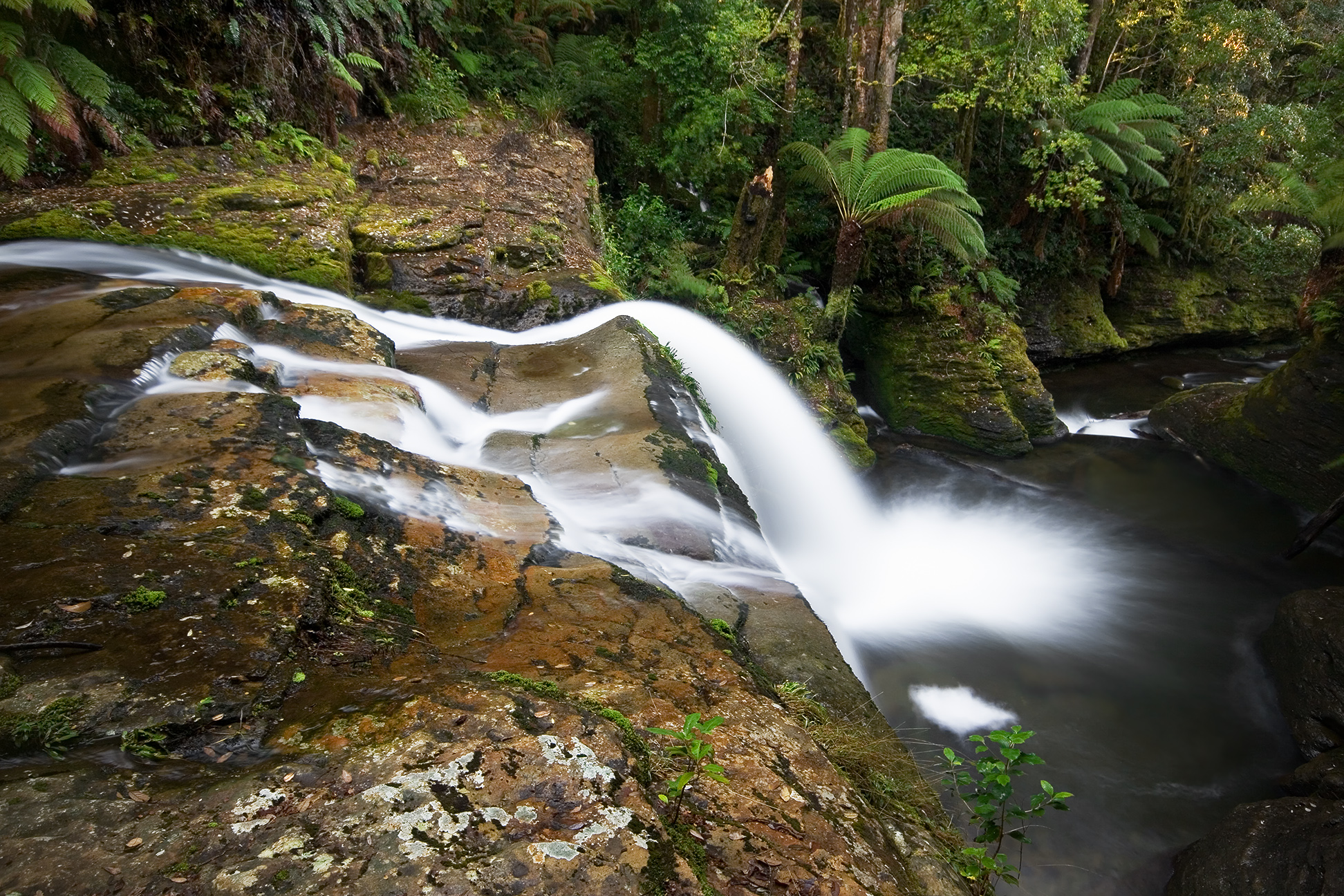
Spout Falls.

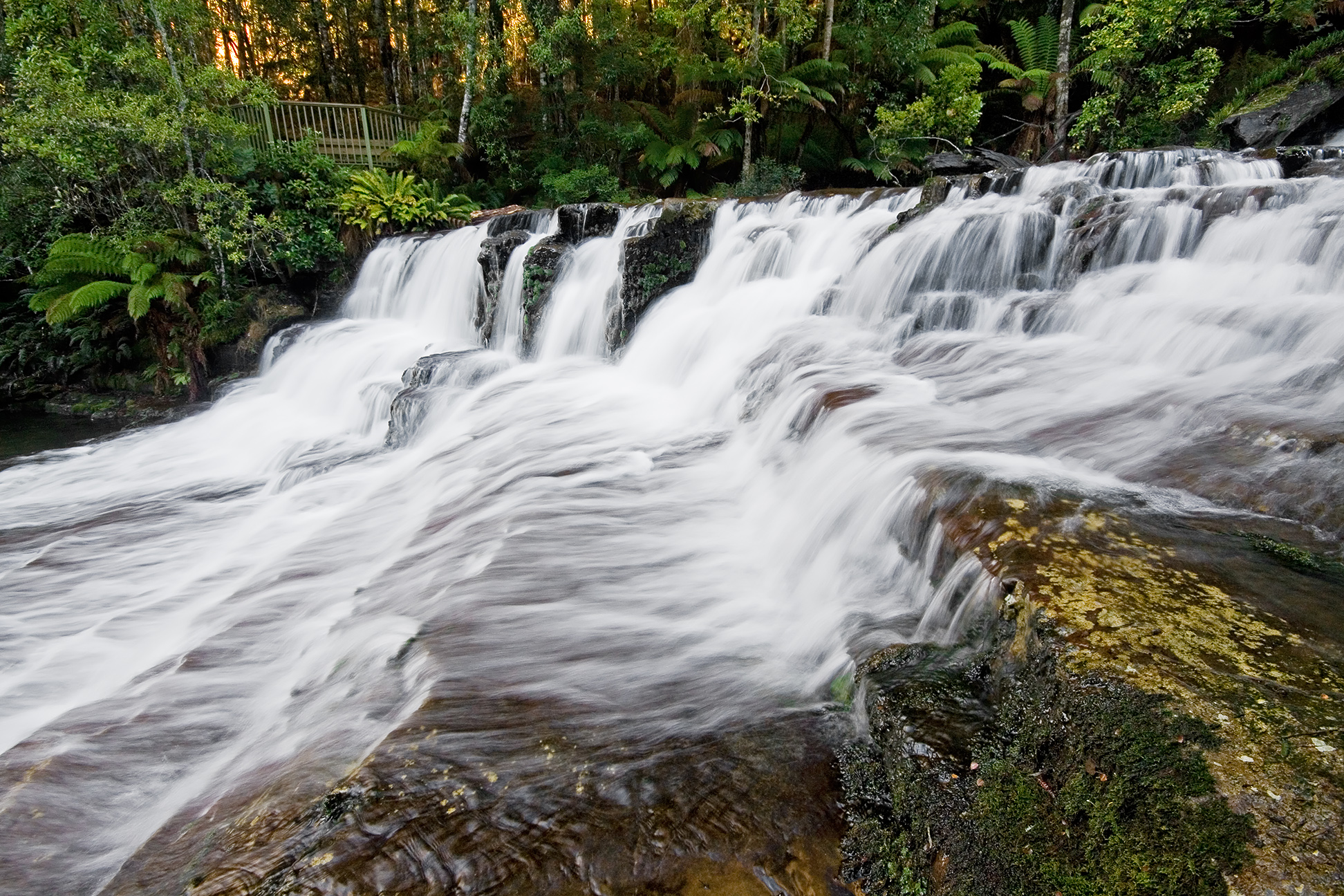
Liffey Cascade.

== See also ==
- List of waterfalls
- List of waterfalls in Australia
