= Liffey Valley Reserve =

Protected area in Tasmania, Australia

- Location within Tasmania
- Location: Tasmania
- Coordinates: 41.6889°S 146.8122°E
- Area: 3.83 km^{2} (1.48 sq mi)
- Established: 1991
- Governing body: Bush Heritage Australia
- Website: Official website

The Liffey Valley Reserves are a set of nature reserve five separate parcels of land, with a combined area of 383 ha (950 acres), in the Liffey Valley of northern Tasmania, Australia. They are located about 55 km (34 mi) south-west of Launceston and 25 km (16 mi) south-east of Deloraine. The reserves are owned and managed by the nature conservation charity Bush Heritage Australia.

== History ==
Two of the component reserves, Liffey River and Dry's Bluff (Taytitikitheeker), were purchased by Bob Brown in 1990, to protect them from being logged. These became the first reserves of the Australian Bush Heritage Fund, now Bush Heritage Australia. The third reserve, Coalmine Creek, was purchased by Bob at the same time for much the same reason, and he then donated it to Bush Heritage in 2003. He donated Oura Oura to Bush Heritage in 2011. Glovers Flat reserve was purchasd in 2022

== Landscape and vegetation ==
The Liffey Valley is part of the catchment of the Meander River and drains the cliffs of the Great Western Tiers, dropping precipitously from 1,200 to 400 m (3,900 to 1,300 ft) asl in a distance of 10 km (6.2 mi). Vegetation types range from alpine heath to wet and dry sclerophyll forests, with temperate rainforest gullies.

== Fauna ==
Mammals recorded from the reserve are Tasmanian devils and platypuses as well as bandicoots, bettongs, potoroos and pygmy possums. Birds found there include threatened Tasmanian wedge-tailed eagles, pink robins and yellow-tailed black-cockatoos.
