= Liffey, Tasmania =

Liffey
- Town
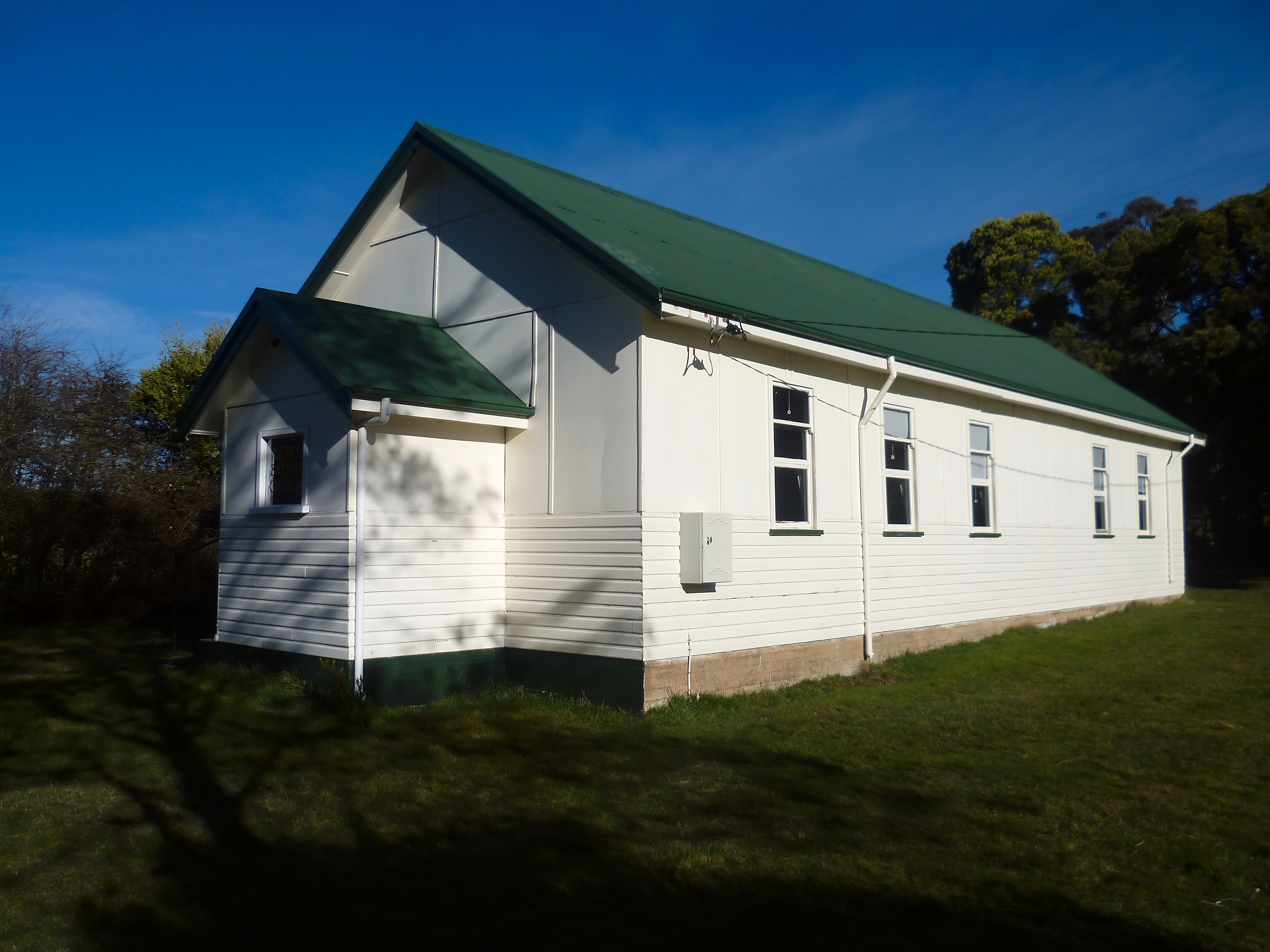
- Liffey baptist church

- Coordinates: 41°40′S 146°54′E
- Country: Australia
- State: Tasmania
- Region: Launceston, Central
- LGA: Meander Valley, Northern Midlands
- Location: 216 km (134 mi) N of Hobart; 41 km (25 mi) SW of Launceston; 9 km (5.6 mi) W of Bracknell; 24 km (15 mi) S of Westbury

Government
  - State electorate: Lyons
  - Federal division: Lyons

Population
  - Total: 155 (2016 census)
- Postcode: 7301
Localities around Liffey
Golden Valley	Bracknell, Cluan, Golden Valley	Bracknell
Golden Valley	Liffey	Bracknell, Blackwood Creek
Central Plateau	Central Plateau Conservation Area	Blackwood Creek

Liffey is a rural locality and town in the local government areas of Meander Valley and Northern Midlands in the Launceston and Central regions of Tasmania. The locality is about 24 kilometres (15 mi) south of the town of Westbury. The 2016 census recorded a population of 155 for the state suburb of Liffey. It was named by Captain William Moriarty, from Ireland. The town is situated in rainforest, on the Liffey River at the foot of the Great Western Tiers. Nearby towns are Bracknell and Blackwood Creek.

The most notable attraction in the area is Liffey Falls.

== History ==
Liffey was gazetted as a locality in 1968. Liffey Post Office opened on 16 August 1887 and closed in 1973.

== Geography ==
The Liffey River flows through from south-west to north-east.

== Road infrastructure ==
Highland Lakes Road (A5) follows much of the western boundary, and passes through the south-west corner. Route C513 (Liffey Road / Gulf Road) enters from the north-east and runs west along the Liffey River to the Lower Liffey Falls carpark.
