= Osmaston, Tasmania =

Osmaston
- Town
- Coordinates: 41°34′33″S 146°45′53″E
- Country: Australia
- State: Tasmania
- Region: Launceston
- LGA: Meander Valley
- Location: 45 km (28 mi) SW of Launceston

Government
  - State electorate: Lyons
  - Federal division: Lyons

Population
  - Total: 88 (2016 census)
- Postcode: 7303
Localities around Osmaston
Deloraine	Exton	Westbury
Deloraine	Osmaston	Westbury
Quamby Brook	Quamby Brook	Cluan

Osmaston is a rural locality in the local government area of Meander Valley in the Launceston region of Tasmania. It is located about 45 kilometres (28 mi) south-west of the town of Launceston. According to the 2021 Australian census, the population consists of 96 people in Osmaston.

== History ==
Osmaston was gazetted as a locality in 1968.

== Geography ==
Quamby Brook (the watercourse) forms the north-western, northern, and north-eastern boundaries.

== Road infrastructure ==
The C501 route (Osmaston Road) passes through from east to west. The C502 route (Exton Road / Bogan Road) passes through the north-west corner from north to south, where it intersects with C501.
