= Whitemore, Tasmania =

Whitemore
- Town
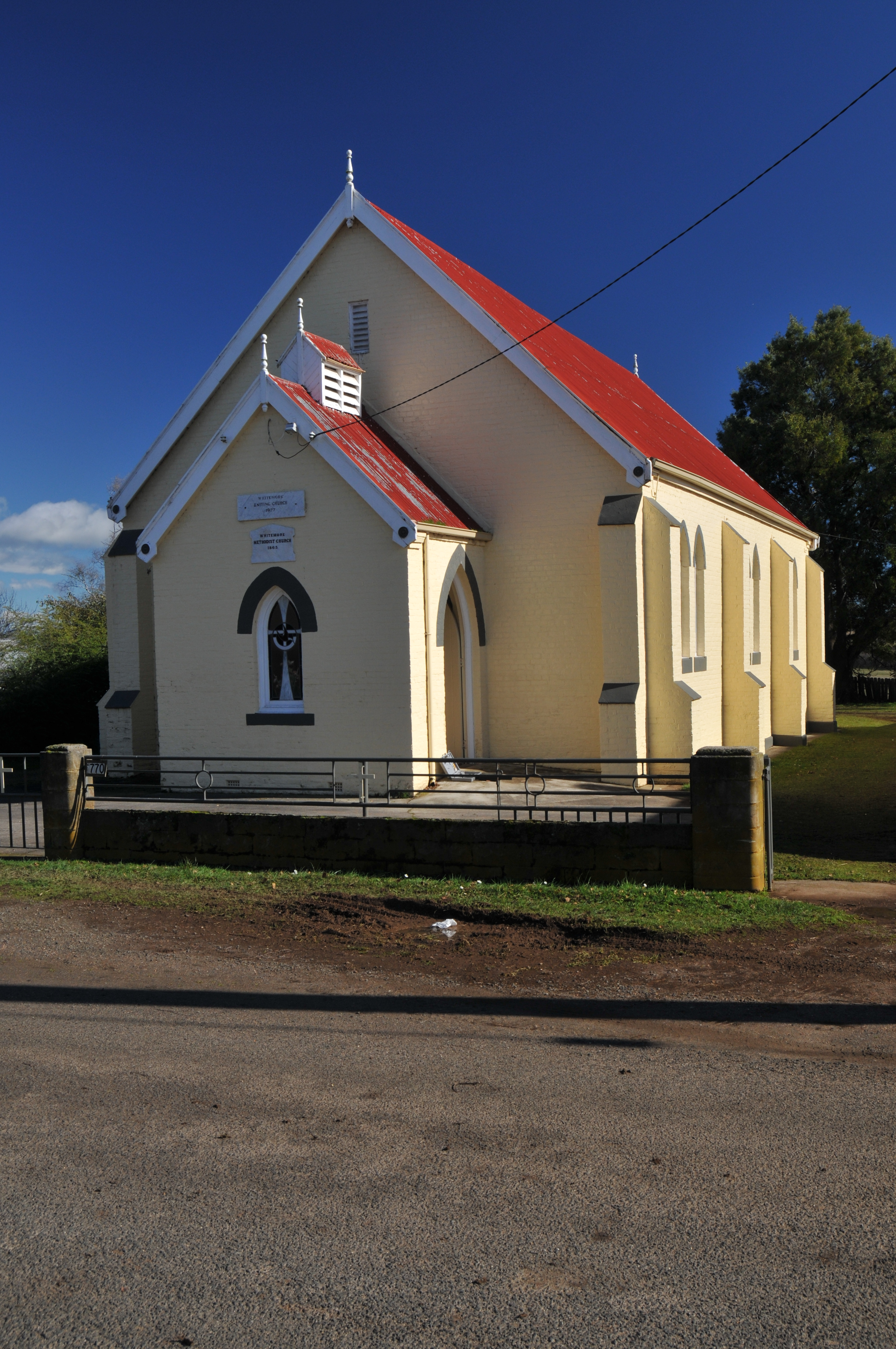
- Whitemore's church, completed in 1865

- Coordinates: 41°35′12″S 146°55′31″E
- Country: Australia
- State: Tasmania
- Region: Launceston
- LGA: Meander Valley Council
- Location: 24 km (15 mi) SW of Launceston; 11 km (6.8 mi) SE of Westbury
- Established: c.1857

Government
  - State electorate: Lyons
  - Federal division: Lyons
- Elevation: 183 m (600 ft)

Population
  - Total: 198 (2016 census)
- Postcode: 7303
Localities around Whitemore
Hagley	Carrick, Hagley	Carrick
Hagley	Whitemore	Oaks
Cluan	Bracknell	Bracknell

Whitemore is a rural locality and small town in the local government area of Meander Valley in the Launceston region of Tasmania. The locality is about 11 kilometres (6.8 mi) south-east of the town of Westbury. The 2016 census recorded a population of 198 for the state suburb of Whitemore.

The town's land and surrounding rural area was first granted to Richard Dry in the 1830s then sold for farming to William Hingston in 1854. Hingston constructed a Wesleyan Chapel, near which a few later buildings were added. Over time the town has had a blacksmith, post office, library, shops and petrol station; none of these remain in the 21st century.

Shaw Contracting, a large Civil engineering firm formed by James Alan Hope Shaw, has been the most significant business in the town's history. Whitemore's most prominent features are the 1864 brick church, adjacent original church building dating from 1857—now a community hall—and the large workshop and offices of Shaw contracting.

From 1870 to sometime before 1978 the town had a nearby rail service but in the 21st century transport is by car or school bus. The town has a small largely Australian born, and aging, population. Whitemore has a few houses, a church that is part of the Uniting Church in Australia, the offices and workshops of Shaw Contracting, and a recreation ground and tennis courts used by the towns' tennis and cricket teams.

== History ==
Whitemore is in the southern part of the former Quamby estate. The estate was granted to Richard Dry, father of Richard Dry who was later Premier of Tasmania, in 1837. The estate was in two main parts. The southern section was approximately 4,500 acres (1,800 ha), including an outlying part of 500 acres (200 ha) on which the modern town of Whitemore lies. The land in this section was recorded as first leased to William Burke in 1846. He worked a 200-acre (81 ha) lot as a tenant farmer, though it was probably leased before this, as at the time 200-acre (81 ha) was recorded in the lands returns records as cleared. This southern part of Quamby Estate covered the Whitemore Creek valley, the later town of Whitemore and Shaw's farm, amongst other later farms.

By 1851, 350 acres of the 500 acre section was cleared. By the mid-1850s the area had been settled for almost two decades and was noted as "fairly well populated". Dry sold land in the area in 1854 to William Hingston, who named a 120 acres (49 ha) section "Whitemoor farm" after a farm his family had run as tenant farmers in Cornwall. Hingston's land ownership and actions assisted the establishment of Whitemore as a central village of the surrounding farming area. Around 1857 Hingston donated the land for a Wesleyan chapel that became known as "Whitemoor chapel". Over time this name was taken by the village that grew around the church. Hingston built "Whitemoor house" in c.1860 using locally made bricks. The building was extant as of 2002.

By the time Hingston built Whitemoor House the town had a modest country store, a blacksmith's shop and the Wesleyan chapel. The town never became the population centre and Whitemoor remained a farming district with only a few buildings clustered near the church. By 1865 the town had four substantial buildings: A brick church; the original wooden church now used as a school; and two cottages. As late as 1915 there were only three occupied cottages in the town.

Land was purchased by the local council in 1951 for a memorial hall to commemorate those who served in the two world wars. Built largely using volunteer labour and working bees, the hall opened on 9 December 1953. The buildings in Whitemore are constructed either side of the only road through the town. The town section of this road was sealed in 1953.

Whitemore was gazetted as a locality in 1968.

== Geography ==
The Bass Highway forms the northern boundary, and Whitemore Road forms part of the eastern boundary.

== Road infrastructure ==
The Bass Highway (National Route 1) runs from east and to west along the northern boundary. Route C507 (Black Hills Road / Whitemore Road) enters from the north-west and runs through to the south-east, where it exits. Route C508 (an extension of Whitemore Road) starts at an intersection with C507 and runs north-east until it exits, where it then forms part of the eastern boundary. Route C510 (Adelphi Road / Glenore Road) starts at an intersection with C507 and runs west and south-west until it exits.

== Services ==
In common with the rest of Tasmania, Whitemore no longer has passenger rail transport; the last Tasmanian passenger rail service stopped in 1978 and the service to Whitemore prior to that. Rail transport for Whitemore opened in the late 1870s. The first passenger train was on 27 April 1870 and the rail line opened for regular traffic in February 1871. This transport was from a siding rather than a station. The Whitemore siding did not have a full-time station master and was not a regular stop; passengers had to request the train stop or flag the train for a pickup. The town's only regular transport services as of 2014 are Redline Coaches' private school-bus services.

One of the town's buildings was used as a house and a shop from 1859; a Shell petrol bowser was installed in the late 1920s outside the shop. A district post office was established in 1871 at the railway siding's station house. By 1908 the post office was run from the chapel house in the main part of the town, and a shop ran from the same building. This building was used for around 70 years as a store, telephone exchange, mail exchange and petrol station. The post office closed in 1977 and has not reopened.

Telephone services reached Whitemore in 1918, initially with only three subscribers. Telephone switching was done at the post office. Whitemore was connected to the State's electricity system in 1929. The electricity was fed from the Hydro-Electric scheme and was connected to twelve buildings, in Whitemore and several nearby farms, by August of the same year. There may have been blacksmiths in Whitemore from the mid-19th century. A blacksmith established a shop on the main road in 1895 that was, by 1900, the only blacksmith in the area. Shaw Contracting's office is on the site of this former blacksmith's shop.

The Whitemore irrigation scheme was begun in 2010 to provide irrigation water to 12,000 hectares (46 sq mi) of farmland with water from the Poatina Hydroelectric Power Station. The scheme uses a 400 megalitre dam for storage.

== Religion ==
A Methodist circuit had been established in Westbury in 1848 with meetings held in homes of the Oaks Estate. After Hingston purchased his land in 1854, Methodist meetings were held at his home. Hingston's home proved too cramped for religious meetings so in 1857 he donated land for a chapel, which was built in the same year by Joshua Higgs. It was an all timber 18 by 30 feet (5.5 m × 9.1 m) building made from pit-sawn beams clad with split timber. It opened for services on 13 December 1857, after completion at a total cost of 250 pounds. The wooden church was also used as a Sunday school and state school from 1865 to 1928. A chapel house was built in 1859 next to the church by the Wesleyan trustees. This house was used initially by David Tinning, the town's first school teacher.

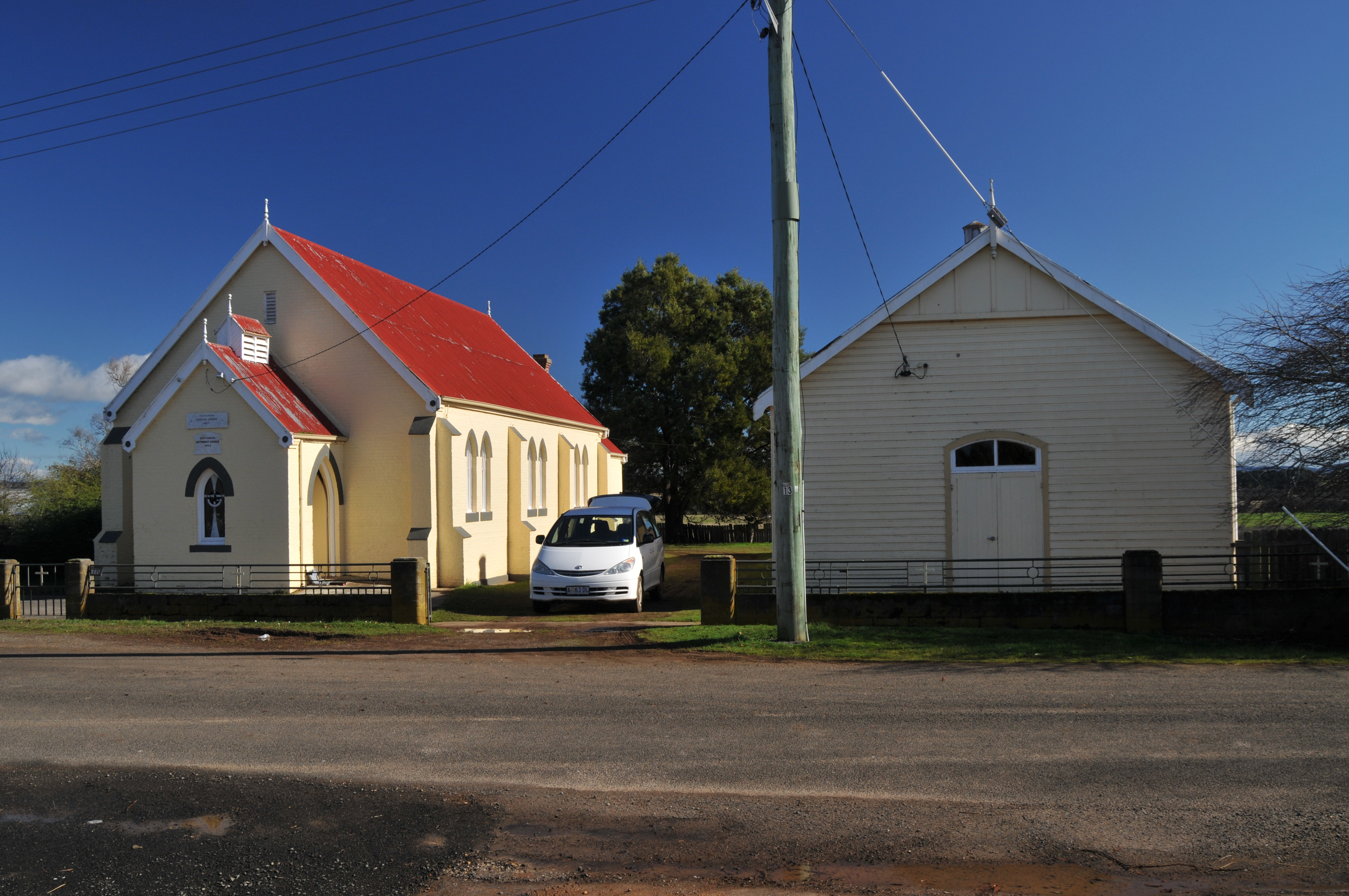
The 1865 brick church, and 1857 wooden church—now a community hall

In the 1860s a new church was planned. The original wooden building was relocated in 1864, and the new church subsequently built on its site. Its foundation stone was laid on 30 November 1864; the year of the Australian Wesleyan Church's jubilee observance. The church is a brick-structure in a Gothic architectural style, and was designed to hold 200 people. The new Wesleyan chapel at Whitemoor, as it was then known, was opened Sunday 4 June 1865. It had cost 450 pounds, 150 from the Wesleyan building fund and the remainder from subscriptions, fund-raising and donations. The money from Wesleyan building fund was a 10-year loan. By 1929 it was used as a Methodist chapel in 1929 and in the 21st century is part of the Uniting Church in Australia.

The original wooden church building was moved again in 1909 and extended in 1928 for use as a community hall. It had a kitchen extension added in 1955 and a kindergarten room in 1958. The split paling cladding was replaced with weatherboards in the 1900s. The roof was replaced with iron, probably in 1914 when the brick church was also re-roofed in iron. The interior paling lining of the old wooden church was covered with pine sheeting in the late 1930s. This building has been used as a church for seven years, more than sixty years as a meeting room and community centre and more than seventy years as a day and Sunday school. After the school moved to a new building in 1929 the old building remained in use as a Sunday school.

== Sport and recreation ==
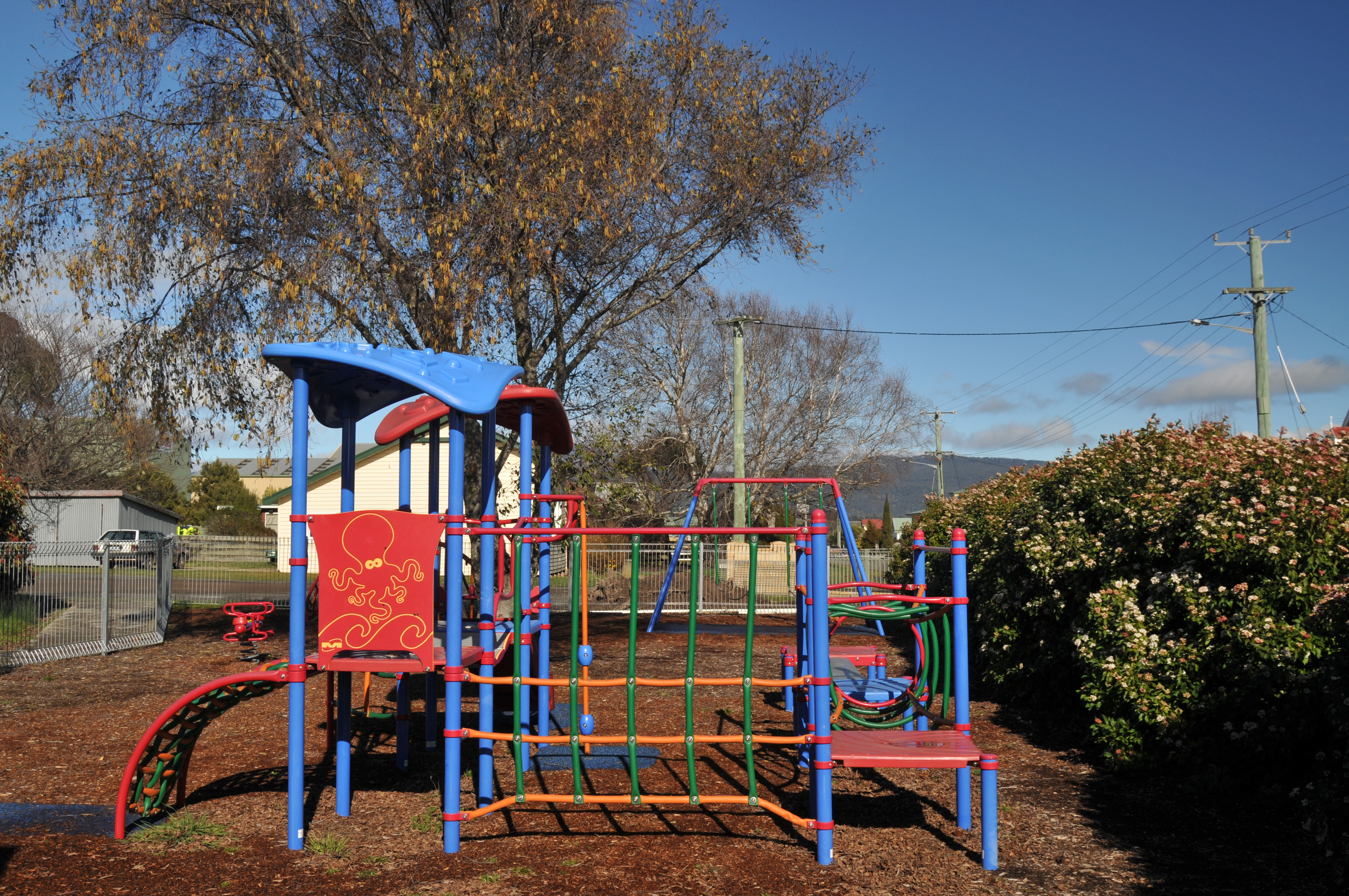
Whitemore's playground

On the main street, opposite the church, is a recreation ground and playground, both maintained by the Meander Valley Council. The recreation ground was upgraded with toilets c.1949 that were replaced with newer ones in 1966. Playground equipment was installed in 1964.

Whitemore cricket club began in the 19th century. An early record is of a match against Oaks in 1898, though club minutes date only from 1927 at which time it was playing in the Westmoreland association. A cricket pavilion was built some time prior to 1900 and was replaced during 1962–63. The cricket club has continued to field teams and in 2013 they played in the B grade of the Northern Midlands Cricket Association. Their most successful years were from the 1960s through to the 1980s.

Whitemore tennis club had its first meeting on 18 November 1910. Asphalt was laid on the courts in November 1921 and a shed built in February 1923. From 1928 the tennis club fielded two teams in the newly formed district tennis association. Lights were installed on the courts in 1958. The tennis club had three plexipave courts by 2002. As of 2012 the Whitemore Tennis club fielded an amateur A grade team, and others in lower divisions

== School and Library ==
The first wooden church was used as the area's school from 1857. This dual use of the church as a school has been stated, by local historian Ivan Heazlewood, as likely to be planned from the beginning. The area was more heavily populated in the past than in the 21st century due to a large number of tenant farmers with large families. Heazlewood speculated that the later 1865 church was probably used for classes due to the small size of the wooden school building. The school grew to around 100 pupils on the register in 1900. The church building, also used for Wesleyen Sunday school, was used as a school until 1929. For this period the Education Department rented it from the Church trustees. A new school was built, on donated land, opposite the church and next to the recreation ground. This state school was opened in a ceremony on 23 August 1929. The school remained open as late as the end of 1954.

A library was operating from the wooden church building by 1860. Patronage of the library had declined markedly by the 20th century and by the 1930s it was virtually unused. A mobile library began calling in the 1960s and for a time called once per month. The bookmobile service was finally ended, for all places not only Whitemore, in 1998.

== Current town ==
In the 21st century, Whitemore consists of a small cluster of buildings either side of the only road, surrounded by farming land. By the late 20th century, the town's population was ageing, and it was described as somewhat of a retirement village. The buildings owned by Shaw Contracting dominate the town; they have two workshops and a three-storey office.

=== Agriculture and land ===
The town sits on flat to gently undulating land in the base of the Meander Valley. The soil is primarily of alluvial origin, underlain by dolomite bedrock. Whitemore creek, a tributary of the Meander River (Tasmania), flows past Whitemore. The creek is seasonal, often drying up completely in summer. The Whitemore Irrigation Scheme has reduced the dry periods by discharging up to 2 megalitres (71,000 cu ft) per day into the creek for downstream irrigation use.

Whitemore, along with Hagley, has historically had one of the highest concentrations of stud farms breeding pedigree livestock, in Australia. In the 1950s there were more than 100 registered studs within 5 miles (8.0 km) of the town's centre. The Poll Dorset, an important breed in prime lamb production in Australia, was first bred at a Whitemore stud. Whitemore farmers, the French family, began breeding Ryeland lambs in early 21st century. The family had originally farmed this breed in the 1930s, but it had now become uncommon in Australia due to changing fashions in meat. The Heazlewood family breeds the Border Leicester, another sheep breed that is now uncommon in Australia. The family was honoured by the Royal Agricultural Society of Tasmania in 2013 for their involvement in the Tasmanian sheep industry over the previous one hundred years.

In 2014 a Whitemore farm attracted media attention creating the first crop maze in Tasmania. It was designed by specialist crop design company from the United Kingdom, and created to attract tourists and visitors. The maze was in the form of a stylized Tasmanian tiger, cut into a 5-hectare (12-acre) sorghum field. An open day was held on 28 February 2014 and the maze subsequently opened to the public, until the crop was harvested a few weeks later.

=== Shaw Contracting ===
Shaw Contracting is a large Tasmanian civil contracting firm based in Whitemore. Its two large workshops and three-storey office dominate the town; the company has stood large in Whitemore since the mid-20th Century. James Alan Hope Shaw was born in Bridgenorth, Tasmania in 1904. He designed and built agricultural machinery, including the first "stump jump" scarifier that was suitable for the northwest coast of Tasmania. In 1939 Shaw was granted a patent for "An improved scraper for reversible disc ploughs". This plough was never commercialised though some prototypes were built and used. Shaw moved to Whitemore in late 1935 and began work as an agricultural service provider, from what had been a blacksmith's workshop.

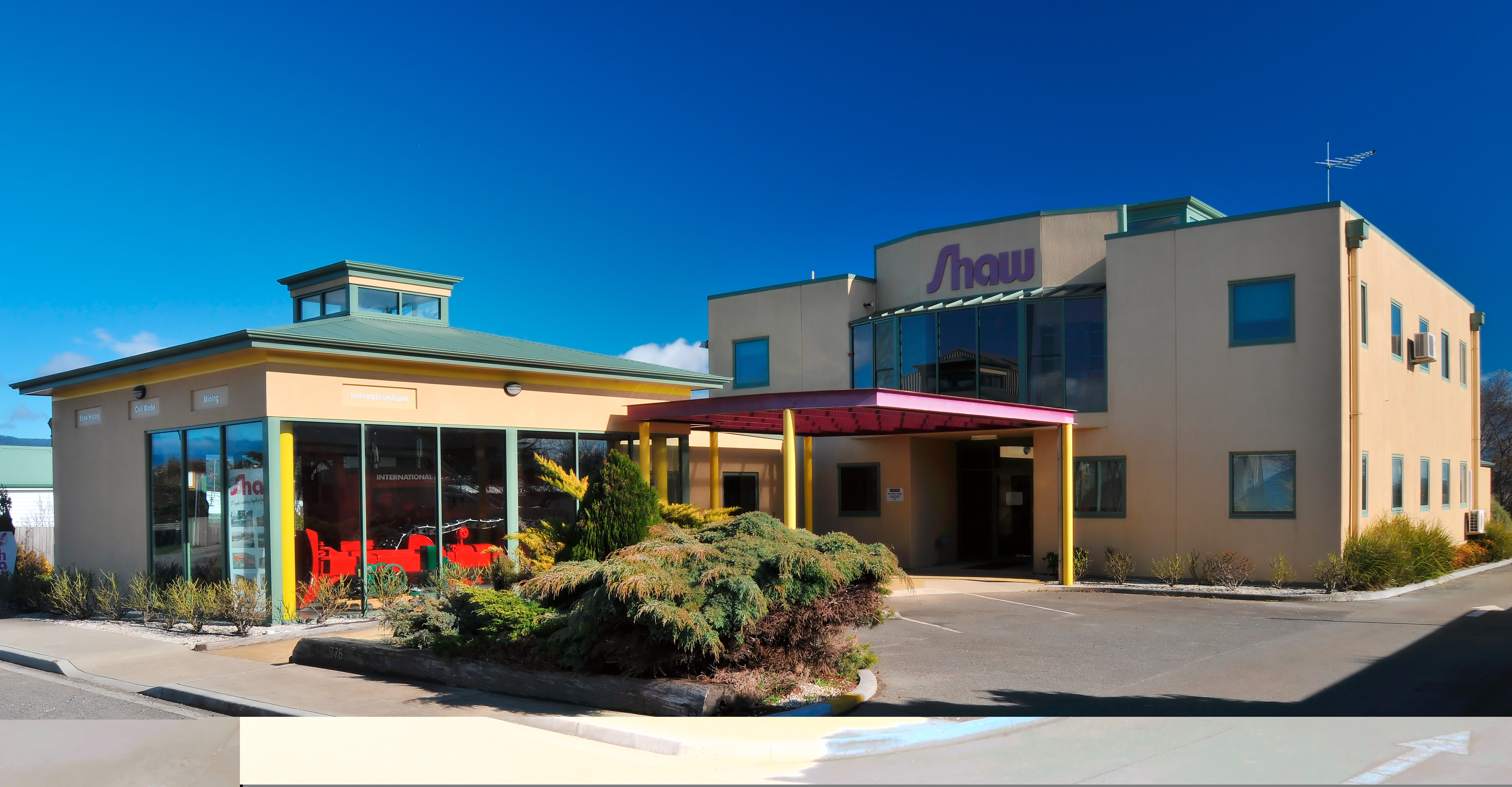
Shaw Contracting's offices in August 2012

His company expanded into civil construction work during World War II. Using in-house manufactured equipment they scarified 5 mi (8.0 km) of road so it was ready for regrading. The company's work did have some negative impacts on the town. When they had electricity installed their first welder drew so much power the town's supply had to be upgraded. This welder also put out sufficient radio-frequency interference to disrupt radio reception elsewhere the town; a matter that caused some complaint. They added vehicle sales and maintenance in the 1940s and expanded with the purchase of a one-acre lot opposite the original workshop in 1946. A significant part of the Shaw company's income from the late 1940s to the early 1950s was selling vehicle tires. The company continued to expand and a new workshop was opened in the town, with a ceremony in August 1953. In the same year the company became an agent for "David Brown" tractors, its first agency.

In 1958 James Shaw and a partner purchased a 25-ton International Harvester TD24 tractor that was formerly owned by Tasmania's Hydro Electric Commission. The company by this point was known as "JAH Shaw & Sons". With the lack of a transporter at first the tractor could only be used in the close surrounds. One of its first jobs was levelling the tennis courts in Whitemore. By 1960 JAH Shaw & Sons had moved into large scale earth-moving. In 1970 they tendered for, and won, work on the Cressy to Longford irrigation scheme; 7 km (4 mi) of main channel excavation and 100 km (62 mi) of smaller channels. By the 1970s the company was known as "Shaw Contracting". An offshoot was launched in 1973 as "Shaw Mix" which sold concrete and created and installed precast concrete panels. Shaw Mix were involved with the Launceston General Hospital and some cast concrete bridges but this line of work ceased during the 1990s. Other significant contracts have included: Building 11 kilometres (7 mi) of the Hume freeway from Seymour to Avenel Victoria in 1978; A road upgrade near Samoa's capital Apia in 2004; Constructing, from 2009, a 15 kilometres (9 mi) bypass of the Town of Dilston on the road from Launceston to Georgetown. The company completed their three-storey offices in the town in 1999. Alwyn Shaw—Son of James Shaw—and his wife Judy ran the business until 2013, when they sold it to a group that included long-term company employees. When sold the company had approximately 100 employees.

== Bibliography ==
- Greenhill, Virginia (2002). In the blink of an eye. Westbury: Westbury historical society.
- Heazlewood, Ivan C (2007). Sesquicentenary of the Wesleyan Chapel – Whitemoor 1857–2007. Whitemore, Tasmania: Heazlewood Ivan C.
- Snare, Richard (2010). Shaw -: If satisfied tell others... Whitemore, Tasmania: Shaw Contracting Pty Ltd. ISBN 9780980678895.
- Heazlewood, Ivan C (2002). They sowed, we reap; 170 years of Whitemore's history from land grant to family farm. Whitemore, Tasmania: Whitemore historical group.
