= Liffey River (Tasmania) =

River in Tasmania, Australia

Liffey
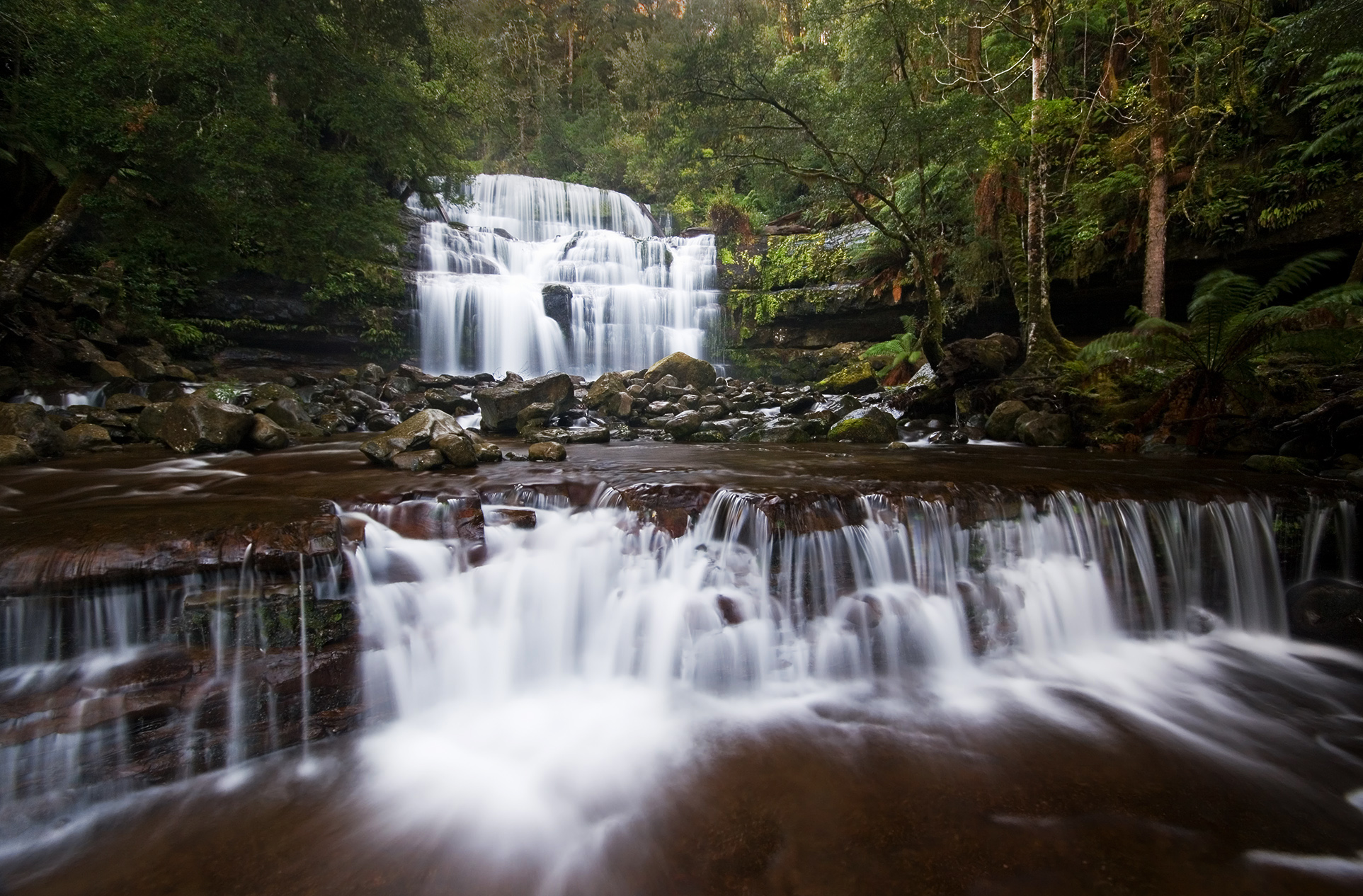
- Liffey Falls in the upper river

- Location of the Liffey River mouth in Tasmania
- Etymology: River Liffey, Ireland

Location
- Country: Australia
- State: Tasmania

Physical characteristics
- Source: Great Western Tiers
  - location: Dry Bluff
  - elevation: 1,210 m (3,970 ft)
- Mouth: Meander River
  - location: near Carrick
  - coordinates: 41°30′S 147°02′E
  - elevation: 134 m (440 ft)
- Length: 52.6 km (32.7 mi)
- Basin size: 224 km^{2} (86 sq mi)
- Discharge
  - location: Carrick2004–2011 average flow
  - average: 2.05 m^{3}/s (72 cu ft/s)2004–2011 average flow
  - minimum: 0 m^{3}/s (0 cu ft/s)
  - maximum: 171.6 m^{3}/s (6,060 cu ft/s)13 Aug 2005 peak hourly flow

Basin features
- River system: Tamar River system
- Nature reserve: Liffey Valley Reserve

The Liffey River is a river in Northern Tasmania, Australia.

== Route and catchment area ==
It flows from Projection Bluff on the north side of Dry's Bluff in the Great Western Tiers to the Meander River near Carrick, and is one of its main tributaries. The Liffey has a modern catchment area of 224 square kilometres (86 sq mi) which has been modified by human activity, specifically diversion for irrigation. Flow is highly seasonal with the largest average monthly flows from July to September.

The flow, and effective catchment area, are affected by irrigation diversion. Excess flow from the Cressy-Longford irrigation scheme is diverted into the river increasing summer flow in the river's lower reaches. This irrigation diversion originates at the Poatina Hydroelectric Power Station's tailrace and enters the river near Bracknell. Though the upper hills are known for their cool temperate rainforest, land along most of the river's length is used for agriculture. Water quality in the lower reaches is affected by agricultural run-off and for a small length by discharge from a sewerage plant at Carrick. The plant, which also handles sewerage from nearby Hadspen, discharges treated waste-water into a tributary of the Liffey.

The river was originally known as Tellerpangger by the aboriginal inhabitants of the area, the Panninher clan of the North Midlands Nation. Upon British occupation it was renamed Penny Royal Creek, after a plant that grew profusely on its banks, and the Panninher became known as the Pennyroyal Creek Tribe. William Bryan, an early settler in Carrick, used his influence to rename the river during the early 19th century, after the River Liffey in his homeland Ireland.

== Bridges ==
The Liffey River—then called Pennyroyal Creek—was first bridged at Carrick in 1828 with a simple log structure. This was replaced in the 1830s with a more substantial bridge, though still wooden. Liffey bridge was repaired and raised in the mid-1860s, keeping the original foundations. In May 1875 water sufficiently eroded these foundations to lead to the bridge's collapse, when one of the two supporting piles (logs) gave way. All of the Liffey bridges, and the connecting parts of the road, were subject to inundation when the river flooded; the 1929 Tasmanian Floods carried the bridge away. In the 1950s the road was reconstructed and the bridge again replaced. To reduce the incidence and impact of flooding both were raised substantially leaving the nearby Carrick Mill's ground floor far below the road level.

== Flora and fauna ==
The upper river is surrounded by cool temperate rainforest.

The Liffey is fished for brown trout (Salmo trutta) during the August to April fishing season. Trout were first introduced into the river in 1870, near the same time there were releases in the Meander River. Trout were again released into the river by the fisheries commission in 1940, and by 1949 specimens of up to 11 pounds (5 kg) had been caught in the river's upper reaches. Apart from introduced brown trout the Liffey River is home to platypus (Ornithorhynchus anatinus). Platypus in the river have, in common with in other rivers nearby, been found with the potentially lethal fungal infection Mucor amphibiorum.

== See also ==
- Liffey Valley Reserve
- List of rivers of Australia § Tasmania
