= List of localities in Tasmania =

List of towns, cities and suburbs in Tasmania

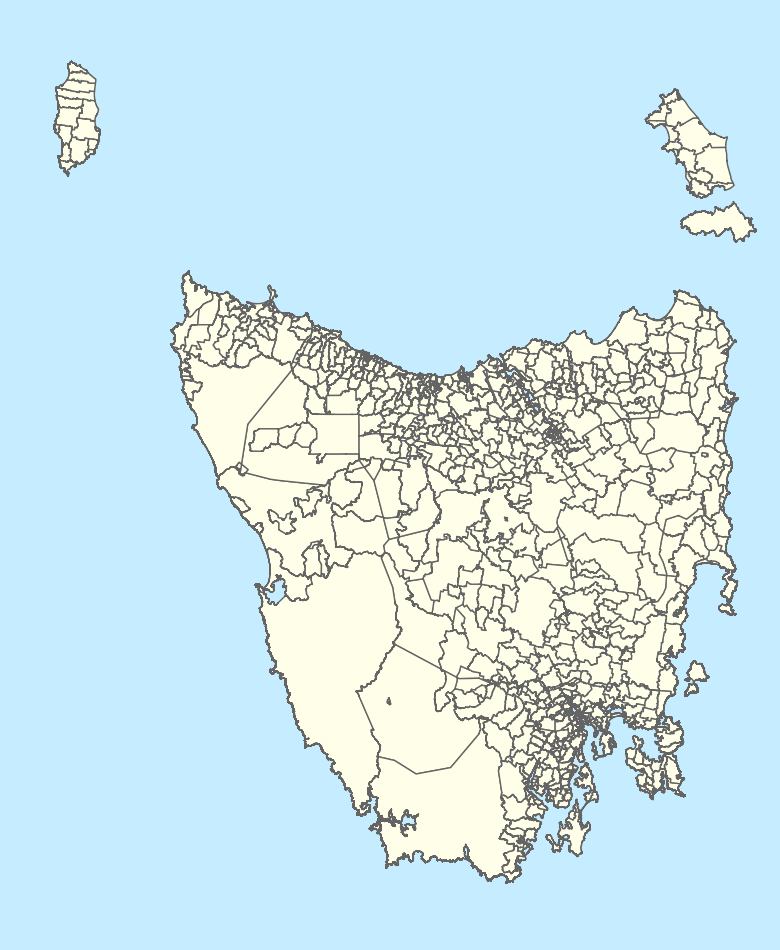
Map of locality boundaries in Tasmania

This is a list of all bounded localities in Tasmania, Australia, as recognised by the Land Information System Tasmania. The definition of a locality for this list is an administrative area which uniquely defines the name of a place to enable street addressing, in metropolitan areas it may also be referred to as a 'suburb'. Every locality has been defined with boundaries that do not overlap with other localities. A locality may include a town having the same name.

This list includes the postcode, local government area (LGA) and total area of each locality. If a locality spans more than one LGA, it is listed separately for each different LGA as well showing the partial area per LGA.

== List ==
Locality	Postcode	Local government area	Partial area (km^{2})	Total area (km^{2})	
Abbotsham	7315	Central Coast	—	8.2	↑ (Top)
Abels Bay	7112	Huon Valley	—	5.2	
Aberdeen	7310	Devonport	—	4.2	
Acacia Hills	7306	Kentish	—	19.3	
Acton	7320	Burnie	—	0.9	
Acton Park	7170	Clarence	—	19.2	
Adventure Bay	7150	Kingborough	—	11.4	
Akaroa	7216	Break O'Day	—	5.6	
Alberton	7263	Dorset	—	33.4	
Alcomie	7330	Circular Head	—	32.3	
Allens Rivulet	7150	Kingborough	—	12.0	
Alonnah	7150	Kingborough	—	14.8	
Ambleside	7310	Devonport	—	1.1	
Andover	7120	Southern Midlands	—	73.4	
Ansons Bay	7264	Break O'Day	—	229.2	
Antill Ponds	7120	Southern Midlands	—	40.4	
Apollo Bay	7150	Kingborough	—	2.3	
Apslawn	7190	Glamorgan-Spring Bay	—	88.8	
Apsley	7030	Central Highlands	54.8	68.7	
Apsley	7030	Southern Midlands	13.9	68.7	
Arthur River	7330	Circular Head	—	39.6	
Arthurs Lake	7030	Central Highlands	—	215.9	
Austins Ferry	7011	Glenorchy	—	2.1	
Avoca	7213	Northern Midlands	393.1	397.1	
Avoca	7213	Break O'Day	4.0	397.1	
Baden	7120	Southern Midlands	—	20.6	↑ (Top)
Badger Head	7270	West Tamar	—	35.1	
Bagdad	7030	Southern Midlands	—	63.6	
Bakers Beach	7307	Latrobe	—	100.6	
Banca	7265	Dorset	—	122.6	
Bangor	7267	Launceston	—	13.1	
Barnes Bay	7150	Kingborough	—	0.4	
Barretta	7054	Kingborough	—	0.9	
Barrington	7306	Kentish	—	24.6	
Battery Point	7004	Hobart	—	0.7	
Beaconsfield	7270	West Tamar	82.5	88.0	
Beaconsfield	7270	Latrobe	5.5	88.0	
Beaumaris	7215	Break O'Day	—	15.3	
Beauty Point	7270	West Tamar	—	10.0	
Beechford	7252	George Town	—	15.3	
Bell Bay	7253	George Town	—	10.1	
Bellerive	7018	Clarence	—	2.9	
Bellingham	7254	George Town	—	11.6	
Ben Lomond	7212	Northern Midlands	—	182.6	
Berriedale	7011	Glenorchy	—	4.1	
Beulah	7306	Kentish	—	26.5	
Bicheno	7215	Glamorgan-Spring Bay	—	114.4	
Binalong Bay	7216	Break O'Day	—	44.9	
Birchs Bay	7162	Kingborough	—	8.0	
Birralee	7303	Meander Valley	37.6	43.2	
Birralee	7303	West Tamar	5.6	43.2	
Bishopsbourne	7301	Northern Midlands	—	34.0	
Black Hills	7140	Derwent Valley	51.1	54.8	
Black Hills	7140	Southern Midlands	3.7	54.8	
Black River	7321	Circular Head	—	30.4	
Blackmans Bay	7052	Kingborough	—	6.2	
Blackstone Heights	7250	Meander Valley	7.6	7.8	
Blackstone Heights	7250	West Tamar	0.2	7.8	
Blackwall	7275	West Tamar	—	0.7	
Blackwood Creek	7301	Northern Midlands	—	99.7	
Blessington	7212	Launceston	122.9	132.2	
Blessington	7212	Northern Midlands	9.3	132.2	
Blue Rocks	7255	Flinders	—	7.9	
Blumont	7260	Dorset	—	18.3	
Boat Harbour	7321	Waratah-Wynyard	—	19.0	
Boat Harbour Beach	7321	Waratah-Wynyard	—	0.4	
Bonnet Hill	7053	Kingborough	—	2.2	
Boobyalla	7264	Dorset	—	54.0	
Boomer Bay	7177	Sorell	—	5.1	
Bothwell	7030	Central Highlands	—	756.3	
Boyer	7140	Derwent Valley	11.2	11.6	
Boyer	7140	Brighton	0.4	11.6	
Bracknell	7302	Meander Valley	40.2	62.7	
Bracknell	7302	Northern Midlands	22.5	62.7	
Bradys Lake	7140	Central Highlands	—	39.8	
Brandum	7304	Central Highlands	—	7.3	
Branxholm	7261	Dorset	—	45.4	
Breadalbane	7258	Northern Midlands	—	17.0	
Bream Creek	7175	Sorell	—	58.2	
Breona	7304	Central Highlands	—	0.9	
Bridgenorth	7277	West Tamar	48.1	50.4	
Bridgenorth	7277	Meander Valley	2.3	50.4	
Bridgewater	7030	Brighton	—	17.8	
Bridport	7262	Dorset	—	324.2	
Brighton	7030	Brighton	24.8	29.7	
Brighton	7030	Southern Midlands	4.9	29.7	
Brittons Swamp	7330	Circular Head	—	25.4	
Broadmarsh	7030	Southern Midlands	85.6	87.2	
Broadmarsh	7030	Derwent Valley	1.6	87.2	
Broadmeadows	7330	Circular Head	—	8.7	
Bronte Park	7140	Central Highlands	—	572.7	
Brooklyn	7320	Burnie	—	0.4	
Brooks Bay	7116	Huon Valley	—	2.7	
Buckland	7190	Glamorgan-Spring Bay	—	570.7	
Bungaree	7256	King Island	—	76.9	
Burnie	7320	Burnie	—	1.3	
Burns Creek	7212	Launceston	—	27.4	
Bushy Park	7140	Derwent Valley	—	22.1	
Butlers Gorge	7140	Central Highlands	—	168.4	
Cairns Bay	7116	Huon Valley	—		↑ (Top)
Calder	7325	Waratah-Wynyard	—	59.9	
Cambridge	7170	Clarence	—	49.8	
Camdale	7320	Burnie	—	0.7	
Camena	7316	Central Coast	—	5.2	
Campania	7026	Southern Midlands	196.2	210.4	
Campania	7026	Clarence	11.5	210.4	
Campbell Town	7210	Northern Midlands	—	735.4	
Cape Barren Island	7257	Flinders	—	464.6	
Cape Pillar	7182	Tasman	—	33.5	
Cape Portland	7264	Dorset	—	58.8	
Cape Raoul	7184	Tasman	—	19.5	
Carlton	7173	Sorell	—	9.5	
Carlton River	7173	Sorell	—	34.5	
Carrick	7291	Meander Valley	—	58.7	
Castle Forbes Bay	7116	Huon Valley	—	16.9	
Castra	7315	Central Coast	—	15.6	
Caveside	7304	Meander Valley	—	51.7	
Central Plateau	7304	Central Highlands	1,181.8	1,345.4	
Central Plateau	7304	Meander Valley	163.6	1,345.4	
Cethana	7306	Kentish	—	6.3	
Chain of Lagoons	7215	Break O'Day	—	51.2	
Charlotte Cove	7112	Huon Valley	—	0.2	
Chasm Creek	7321	Burnie	—	1.4	
Chigwell	7011	Glenorchy	—	3.0	
Christmas Hills	7330	Circular Head	—	156.9	
Chudleigh	7304	Meander Valley	—	42.3	
Claremont	7011	Glenorchy	13.6	17.9	
Claremont	7011	Derwent Valley	4.3	17.9	
Clarence Point	7270	West Tamar	—	10.8	
Clarendon Vale	7019	Clarence	—	2.0	
Claude Road	7306	Kentish	—	24.9	
Cleveland	7211	Northern Midlands	—	35.1	
Clifton Beach	7020	Clarence	—	7.3	
Cluan	7303	Meander Valley	—	49.6	
Colebrook	7027	Southern Midlands	—	152.3	
Coles Bay	7215	Glamorgan-Spring Bay	—	106.6	
Collinsvale	7012	Glenorchy	19.6	26.1	
Collinsvale	7012	Derwent Valley	6.5	26.1	
Conara	7211	Northern Midlands	—	211.4	
Coningham	7054	Kingborough	—	5.0	
Connellys Marsh	7173	Sorell	—	0.6	
Cooee	7320	Burnie	—	1.7	
Copping	7174	Sorell	—	45.5	
Corinna	7321	Waratah-Wynyard	14.1	26.3	
Corinna	7321	Circular Head	7.6	26.3	
Corinna	7321	West Coast	4.6	26.3	
Cornwall	7215	Break O'Day	—	5.4	
Couta Rocks	7330	Circular Head	—	12.1	
Cowrie Point	7321	Circular Head	—	2.2	
Crabtree	7109	Huon Valley	—	29.0	
Cradle Mountain	7306	West Coast	382.5	789.2	
Cradle Mountain	7306	Meander Valley	339.3	789.2	
Cradle Mountain	7306	Kentish	67.4	789.2	
Cradoc	7109	Huon Valley	—	19.1	
Cramps Bay	7030	Central Highlands	—	2.0	
Cranbrook	7190	Glamorgan-Spring Bay	—	196.0	
Crayfish Creek	7321	Circular Head	—	1.7	
Cremorne	7024	Clarence	—	2.2	
Cressy	7302	Northern Midlands	—	584.6	
Cuckoo	7260	Dorset	—	45.3	
Cuprona	7316	Central Coast	—	16.7	
Currie	7256	King Island	—	11.8	
Cygnet	7112	Huon Valley	—	57.5	
Dairy Plains	7304	Meander Valley	—	31.8	↑ (Top)
Deddington	7212	Northern Midlands	—	270.4	
Dee	7140	Central Highlands	—	116.5	
Deep Bay	7112	Huon Valley	—	15.0	
Deloraine	7304	Meander Valley	—	90.6	
Dennes Point	7150	Kingborough	—	0.7	
Derby	7264	Dorset	—	77.8	
Derwent Bridge	7140	Central Highlands	—	96.6	
Derwent Park	7009	Glenorchy	—	1.7	
Detention	7321	Circular Head	—	1.4	
Deviot	7275	West Tamar	—	10.7	
Devon Hills	7300	Northern Midlands	—	4.2	
Devonport	7310	Devonport	—	10.3	
Dilston	7252	Launceston	—	41.4	
Doctors Point	7304	Central Highlands	—	1.6	
Doctors Rocks	7325	Waratah-Wynyard	—	4.9	
Dodges Ferry	7173	Sorell	—	6.4	
Dolphin Sands	7190	Glamorgan-Spring Bay	—	21.8	
Don	7310	Devonport	—	12.6	
Douglas River	7215	Break O'Day	13.5	16.2	
Douglas River	7215	Glamorgan-Spring Bay	2.7	16.2	
Douglas-Apsley	7215	Break O'Day	161.7	193.8	
Douglas-Apsley	7215	Glamorgan-Spring Bay	25.3	193.8	
Douglas-Apsley	7215	Northern Midlands	6.8	193.8	
Dover	7117	Huon Valley	—	48.1	
Downlands	7320	Burnie	—	0.4	
Dowsing Point	7010	Glenorchy	—	0.6	
Dromedary	7030	Brighton	31.5	36.6	
Dromedary	7030	Southern Midlands	5.1	36.6	
Dulcot	7025	Clarence	—	4.0	
Dunalley	7177	Tasman	53.7	85.0	
Dunalley	7177	Sorell	31.3	85.0	
Dunorlan	7304	Meander Valley	—	27.4	
Dynnyrne	7005	Hobart	—	1.6	
Dysart	7030	Southern Midlands	—	90.6	
Eaglehawk Neck	7179	Tasman	—	51.6	↑ (Top)
East Cam	7321	Burnie	—	9.6	
East Devonport	7310	Devonport	9.6	12.3	
East Devonport	7310	Latrobe	2.7	12.3	
East Launceston	7250	Launceston	—	1.0	
East Ridgley	7321	Burnie	—	17.0	
Eddystone	7264	Break O'Day	—	13.5	
Edgcumbe Beach	7321	Circular Head	—	2.4	
Edith Creek	7330	Circular Head	—	48.3	
Egg Lagoon	7256	King Island	—	69.2	
Eggs & Bacon Bay	7112	Huon Valley	—	1.2	
Elderslie	7030	Southern Midlands	76.7	79.6	
Elderslie	7030	Central Highlands	2.9	79.6	
Electrona	7054	Kingborough	—	1.4	
Elizabeth Town	7304	Meander Valley	—	51.1	
Ellendale	7140	Central Highlands	—	158.9	
Elliott	7325	Waratah-Wynyard	—	33.6	
Emita	7255	Flinders	—	42.5	
Emu Heights	7320	Burnie	—	0.5	
Epping Forest	7211	Northern Midlands	—	136.3	
Erriba	7310	Kentish	—	29.3	
Eugenana	7310	Devonport	—	4.0	
Evandale	7212	Northern Midlands	—	111.1	
Exeter	7275	West Tamar	—	25.3	
Exton	7303	Meander Valley	—	31.4	
Falmouth	7215	Break O'Day	—	34.0	↑ (Top)
Fentonbury	7140	Central Highlands	—	17.1	
Fern Tree	7054	Hobart	5.1	8.0	
Fern Tree	7054	Kingborough	2.9	8.0	
Fingal	7214	Break O'Day	—	410.8	
Fitzgerald	7140	Derwent Valley	—	8.2	
Flintstone	7030	Central Highlands	—	0.4	
Florentine	7140	Central Highlands	324.3	449.1	
Florentine	7140	Derwent Valley	124.8	449.1	
Flowerdale	7325	Waratah-Wynyard	—	15.9	
Flowerpot	7163	Kingborough	—	5.4	
Flowery Gully	7270	West Tamar	—	28.0	
Forcett	7173	Sorell	—	55.0	
Forest	7330	Circular Head	—	44.6	
Forester	7260	Dorset	—	89.9	
Fortescue	7182	Tasman	—	83.4	
Forth	7310	Central Coast	26.6	34.9	
Forth	7310	Devonport	8.3	34.9	
Forthside	7310	Devonport	—	13.7	
Four Mile Creek	7215	Break O'Day	—	30.4	
Frankford	7275	West Tamar	64.5	142.0	
Frankford	7275	Latrobe	61.0	142.0	
Frankford	7275	Meander Valley	16.5	142.0	
Franklin	7113	Huon Valley	—	44.2	
Freycinet	7215	Glamorgan-Spring Bay	—	71.8	
Friendly Beaches	7215	Glamorgan-Spring Bay	—	35.6	
Gagebrook	7030	Brighton	—	2.6	↑ (Top)
Garden Island Creek	7112	Huon Valley	28.2	37.0	
Garden Island Creek	7112	Kingborough	8.8	37.0	
Gardners Bay	7112	Huon Valley	—	19.7	
Gawler	7315	Central Coast	—	38.6	
Geeveston	7116	Huon Valley	—	232.3	
Geilston Bay	7015	Clarence	—	7.3	
George Town	7253	George Town	—	104.7	
Gladstone	7264	Dorset	188.5	327.6	
Gladstone	7264	Break O'Day	139.1	327.6	
Glaziers Bay	7109	Huon Valley	—	4.5	
Glebe	7000	Hobart	—	0.2	
Glen Huon	7109	Huon Valley	—	62.0	
Glendevie	7109	Huon Valley	—	11.2	
Glenfern	7140	Derwent Valley	—	38.3	
Glengarry	7275	West Tamar	—	49.7	
Glenlusk	7012	Glenorchy	6.8	7.3	
Glenlusk	7012	Derwent Valley	0.5	7.3	
Glenora	7140	Derwent Valley	—	17.8	
Glenorchy	7010	Glenorchy	—	10.4	
Golconda	7254	Dorset	47.0	53.0	
Golconda	7254	Launceston	6.0	53.0	
Golden Valley	7304	Meander Valley	—	73.7	
Goodwood	7010	Glenorchy	—	0.5	
Gordon	7150	Kingborough	19.3	19.7	
Gordon	7150	Huon Valley	0.4	19.7	
Gormanston	7466	West Coast	—	67.4	
Goshen	7216	Break O'Day	—	164.0	
Goulds Country	7216	Break O'Day	—	81.0	
Gowrie Park	7306	Kentish	—	11.1	
Granton	7030	Derwent Valley	20.2	25.2	
Granton	7030	Glenorchy	5.0	25.2	
Granville Harbour	7469	West Coast	—	47.0	
Grasstree Hill	7017	Clarence	—	10.2	
Grassy	7256	King Island	—	14.4	
Gravelly Beach	7276	West Tamar	—	6.1	
Gray	7215	Break O'Day	—	33.6	
Great Bay	7150	Kingborough	—	14.2	
Greens Beach	7270	West Tamar	—	15.4	
Gretna	7140	Central Highlands	127.0	132.8	
Gretna	7140	Derwent Valley	5.8	132.8	
Grindelwald	7277	West Tamar	—	5.9	
Grove	7109	Huon Valley	—	20.3	
Guildford	7321	Waratah-Wynyard	—	587.0	
Gunns Plains	7315	Central Coast	—	70.3	
Hadspen	7290	Meander Valley	—	10.8	↑ (Top)
Hagley	7292	Meander Valley	—	64.2	
Hamilton	7140	Central Highlands	—	128.9	
Hampshire	7321	Burnie	206.6	213.3	
Hampshire	7321	Waratah-Wynyard	6.7	213.3	
Harford	7307	Latrobe	—	78.9	
Hastings	7109	Huon Valley	—	43.9	
Havenview	7320	Burnie	—	3.1	
Hawley Beach	7307	Latrobe	—	4.8	
Hayes	7140	Derwent Valley	—	20.5	
Hellyer	7321	Circular Head	—	7.8	
Henrietta	7325	Waratah-Wynyard	—	35.3	
Herdsmans Cove	7030	Brighton	—	0.9	
Hermitage	7030	Central Highlands	—	87.5	
Herrick	7264	Dorset	—	20.1	
Heybridge	7316	Central Coast	4.7	8.3	
Heybridge	7316	Burnie	3.6	8.3	
Highclere	7321	Burnie	—	42.3	
Highcroft	7183	Tasman	—	12.3	
Hillcrest	7320	Burnie	—	0.7	
Hillwood	7252	George Town	—	31.0	
Hobart	7000	Hobart	—	2.1	
Hollow Tree	7140	Central Highlands	—	118.2	
Holwell	7275	West Tamar	27.3	31.0	
Holwell	7275	Latrobe	3.7	31.0	
Honeywood	7017	Brighton	—	7.9	
Howden	7054	Kingborough	—	4.3	
Howrah	7018	Clarence	—	6.6	
Howth	7316	Central Coast	—	3.9	
Huntingfield	7055	Kingborough	—	3.2	
Huonville	7109	Huon Valley	—	38.1	
Ida Bay	7109	Huon Valley	—	6.8	↑ (Top)
Interlaken	7030	Central Highlands	248.8	281.5	
Interlaken	7030	Southern Midlands	20.0	281.5	
Interlaken	7030	Northern Midlands	12.7	281.5	
Invermay	7248	Launceston	—	4.0	
Irishtown	7330	Circular Head	—	33.5	
Jackeys Marsh	7304	Meander Valley	—	52.8	↑ (Top)
Jericho	7030	Southern Midlands	—	91.5	
Jetsonville	7260	Dorset	—	53.2	
Judbury	7109	Huon Valley	—	119.1	
Kamona	7260	Dorset	—	29.8	↑ (Top)
Kaoota	7150	Huon Valley	5.2	15.9	
Kaoota	7150	Kingborough	10.7	15.9	
Karanja	7140	Derwent Valley	—	0.4	
Karoola	7267	Launceston	—	32.2	
Kayena	7270	West Tamar	—	10.4	
Kellevie	7176	Sorell	—	59.0	
Kelso	7270	West Tamar	—	9.1	
Kempton	7030	Southern Midlands	—	83.7	
Kettering	7155	Kingborough	—	14.9	
Killiecrankie	7255	Flinders	—	71.2	
Killora	7150	Kingborough	—	0.1	
Kimberley	7304	Meander Valley	20.4	40.4	
Kimberley	7304	Kentish	20.0	40.4	
Kindred	7310	Central Coast	—	30.1	
Kings Meadows	7249	Launceston	—	5.0	
Kingston	7050	Kingborough	35.9	37.2	
Kingston	7050	Hobart	1.3	37.2	
Kingston Beach	7050	Kingborough	—	1.5	
Koonya	7187	Tasman	—	26.6	
Lachlan	7140	Derwent Valley	—	55.2	↑ (Top)
Lackrana	7255	Flinders	—	296.6	
Lady Barron	7255	Flinders	—	41.3	
Lake Leake	7210	Northern Midlands	230.2	403.6	
Lake Leake	7210	Glamorgan-Spring Bay	173.4	403.6	
Lake Margaret	7467	West Coast	—	12.0	
Lake Sorell	7030	Central Highlands	156.7	197.0	
Lake Sorell	7030	Northern Midlands	40.3	197.0	
Lake St Clair	7140	West Coast	541.0	839.4	
Lake St Clair	7140	Central Highlands	201.7	839.4	
Lake St Clair	7140	Meander Valley	96.7	839.4	
Lalla	7267	Launceston	—	6.2	
Lanena	7275	West Tamar	—	3.0	
Lapoinya	7325	Waratah-Wynyard	—	34.4	
Latrobe	7307	Latrobe	62.0	62.2	
Latrobe	7307	Kentish	0.2	62.2	
Lauderdale	7021	Clarence	—	4.6	
Launceston	7250	Launceston	—	4.5	
Lawitta	7140	Derwent Valley	—	3.0	
Lebrina	7254	Launceston	—	33.4	
Leeka	7255	Flinders	—	22.3	
Lefroy	7252	George Town	—	33.8	
Legana	7277	West Tamar	—	31.9	
Legerwood	7263	Dorset	—	38.6	
Leith	7315	Devonport	3.1	5.6	
Leith	7315	Central Coast	2.5	5.6	
Lemont	7120	Southern Midlands	149.7	171.1	
Lemont	7120	Northern Midlands	21.4	171.1	
Lenah Valley	7008	Hobart	8.3	29.7	
Lenah Valley	7008	Glenorchy	0.1	29.7	
Leslie Vale	7054	Kingborough	—	13.1	
Levendale	7120	Southern Midlands	64.9	93.1	
Levendale	7120	Glamorgan-Spring Bay	28.2	93.1	
Lewisham	7173	Sorell	—	1.9	
Liawenee	7030	Central Highlands	—	41.3	
Liena	7304	Meander Valley	27.9	35.7	
Liena	7304	Kentish	7.8	35.7	
Lietinna	7260	Dorset	—	16.7	
Liffey	7301	Meander Valley	52.7	96.3	
Liffey	7301	Northern Midlands	43.6	96.3	
Lileah	7330	Circular Head	—	111.2	
Lillico	7310	Devonport	—	4.5	
Lilydale	7268	Launceston	42.0	43.9	
Lilydale	7268	Dorset	1.9	43.9	
Lindisfarne	7015	Clarence	—	6.9	
Lisle	7260	Dorset	—	31.6	
Little Pine Lagoon	7140	Central Highlands	—	62.9	
Little Swanport	7190	Glamorgan-Spring Bay	—	149.4	
Loccota	7255	Flinders	—	28.9	
Loira	7275	West Tamar	—	16.7	
London Lakes	7140	Central Highlands	—	108.5	
Long Reach	7253	George Town	—	16.8	
Longford	7301	Northern Midlands	—	175.6	
Longley	7150	Kingborough	—	7.7	
Lonnavale	7109	Huon Valley	—	208.1	
Loongana	7315	Central Coast	—	127.1	
Loorana	7256	King Island	—	130.2	
Lorinna	7306	Kentish	—	37.5	
Lottah	7216	Break O'Day	—	23.9	
Low Head	7253	George Town	—	22.1	
Lower Barrington	7306	Kentish	—	22.3	
Lower Beulah	7306	Kentish	—	42.5	
Lower Longley	7109	Kingborough	10.6	13.4	
Lower Longley	7109	Huon Valley	2.8	13.4	
Lower Marshes	7030	Central Highlands	—	54.6	
Lower Marshes	7030	Southern Midlands	—	20.8	
Lower Snug	7054	Kingborough	—	8.3	
Lower Turners Marsh	7267	Launceston	7.7	9.3	
Lower Turners Marsh	7267	George Town	1.6	9.3	
Lower Wattle Grove	7109	Huon Valley	—	4.8	
Lower Wilmot	7310	Kentish	—	43.5	
Loyetea	7316	Central Coast	—	84.4	
Lucaston	7109	Huon Valley	—	29.0	
Lughrata	7255	Flinders	—	43.7	
Luina	7321	Waratah-Wynyard	—	103.3	
Lulworth	7252	George Town	—	5.6	
Lunawanna	7150	Kingborough	—	6.2	
Lune River	7109	Huon Valley	—	49.1	
Lutana	7009	Glenorchy	—	2.1	
Lymington	7109	Huon Valley	—	17.2	
Lymwood	7256	King Island	—	126.1	
Macquarie Heads	7468	West Coast	—	9.8	↑ (Top)
Macquarie Plains	7140	Derwent Valley	—	8.3	
Magra	7140	Derwent Valley	23.5	27.9	
Magra	7140	Southern Midlands	2.5	27.9	
Magra	7140	Brighton	1.9	27.9	
Malbina	7140	Derwent Valley	—	1.2	
Mangalore	7030	Southern Midlands	51.6	52.1	
Mangalore	7030	Brighton	0.5	52.1	
Mangana	7214	Break O'Day	—	135.6	
Margate	7054	Kingborough	39.2	40.6	
Margate	7054	Huon Valley	1.4	40.6	
Maria Island	—	Glamorgan-Spring Bay	—	101.7	
Marion Bay	7175	Sorell	—	4.3	
Marrawah	7330	Circular Head	—	144.9	
Mathinna	7214	Break O'Day	593.7	611.1	
Mathinna	7214	Dorset	17.4	611.1	
Mawbanna	7321	Circular Head	—	288.5	
Mayberry	7304	Meander Valley	—	31.4	
Maydena	7140	Derwent Valley	—	112.0	
Mayfield	7248	Launceston	—	0.9	
Meadowbank	7140	Central Highlands	—	43.4	
Meander	7304	Meander Valley	—	151.7	
Mella	7330	Circular Head	—	26.6	
Melrose	7310	Devonport	11.3	12.1	
Melrose	7310	Kentish	0.8	12.1	
Melton Mowbray	7030	Southern Midlands	114.3	121.2	
Melton Mowbray	7030	Central Highlands	6.9	121.2	
Memana	7255	Flinders	—	336.1	
Mengha	7330	Circular Head	—	45.2	
Mersey Forest	7304	Meander Valley	358.0	377.4	
Mersey Forest	7304	Kentish	19.4	377.4	
Merseylea	7305	Latrobe	10.5	18.8	
Merseylea	7305	Kentish	8.3	18.8	
Meunna	7325	Waratah-Wynyard	37.0	48.9	
Meunna	7325	Circular Head	11.9	48.9	
Miandetta	7310	Devonport	—	1.7	
Middlesex	7306	Kentish	235.8	278.6	
Middlesex	7306	Meander Valley	33.6	278.6	
Middlesex	7306	Central Coast	9.2	278.6	
Middleton	7163	Huon Valley	1.7	15.8	
Middleton	7163	Kingborough	14.1	15.8	
Midway Point	7171	Sorell	—	2.2	
Miena	7030	Central Highlands	—	110.9	
Milabena	7325	Waratah-Wynyard	27.8	44.4	
Milabena	7325	Circular Head	16.6	44.4	
Millers Bluff	7030	Central Highlands	113.1	124.6	
Millers Bluff	7030	Northern Midlands	11.5	124.6	
Moina	7310	Kentish	—	53.5	
Mole Creek	7304	Meander Valley	139.0	143.1	
Mole Creek	7304	Kentish	4.1	143.1	
Molesworth	7140	Derwent Valley	—	34.7	
Moltema	7304	Meander Valley	—	23.0	
Montagu	7330	Circular Head	—	76.7	
Montagu Bay	7018	Clarence	—	0.5	
Montana	7304	Meander Valley	—	24.8	
Montello	7320	Burnie	—	0.7	
Montrose	7010	Glenorchy	—	2.9	
Montumana	7321	Circular Head	53.9	54.6	
Montumana	7321	Waratah-Wynyard	0.7	54.6	
Moogara	7140	Derwent Valley	—	125.8	
Moonah	7009	Glenorchy	—	2.8	
Mooreville	7321	Burnie	—	12.0	
Moorina	7264	Dorset	—	33.6	
Moorleah	7325	Waratah-Wynyard	—	20.9	
Morass Bay	7030	Central Highlands	—	1.6	
Moriarty	7307	Latrobe	—	21.8	
Mornington	7018	Clarence	—	4.2	
Mount Direction	7252	George Town	70.2	96.0	
Mount Direction	7252	Launceston	25.8	96.0	
Mount Field	7140	Derwent Valley	97.1	157.7	
Mount Field	7140	Central Highlands	60.6	157.7	
Mount Hicks	7325	Waratah-Wynyard	—	35.3	
Mount Lloyd	7140	Derwent Valley	—	100.6	
Mount Nelson	7007	Hobart	5.4	5.9	
Mount Nelson	7007	Kingborough	0.5	5.9	
Mount Roland	7306	Kentish	38.8	56.9	
Mount Roland	7306	Meander Valley	18.1	56.9	
Mount Rumney	7170	Clarence	—	8.1	
Mount Seymour	7120	Southern Midlands	—	29.0	
Mount Stuart	7000	Hobart	—	1.1	
Mount William	7264	Break O'Day	74.3	124.5	
Mount William	7264	Dorset	50.2	124.5	
Mountain River	7109	Huon Valley	—	25.2	
Mowbray	7248	Launceston	—	9.4	
Murdunna	7178	Tasman	—	95.9	
Musselroe Bay	7264	Dorset	—	63.5	
Myalla	7325	Waratah-Wynyard	—	11.7	
Myrtle Bank	7259	Launceston	—	27.7	
Nabageena	7330	Circular Head	—	24.7	↑ (Top)
Nabowla	7260	Dorset	—	100.6	
Naracoopa	7256	King Island	—	4.3	
National Park	7140	Derwent Valley	28.2	32.8	
National Park	7140	Central Highlands	4.6	32.8	
Natone	7321	Burnie	—	21.0	
Needles	7304	Meander Valley	—	20.4	
Neika	7054	Kingborough	8.4	8.5	
Neika	7054	Hobart	0.1	8.5	
Nelson Bay	7330	Circular Head	—	31.6	
New Norfolk	7140	Derwent Valley	—	18.4	
New Town	7008	Hobart	3.9	4.0	
New Town	7008	Glenorchy	0.1	4.0	
Newnham	7248	Launceston	—	6.0	
Newstead	7250	Launceston	—	3.9	
Nicholls Rivulet	7112	Huon Valley	—	36.4	
Nietta	7315	Central Coast	—	59.7	
Nile	7212	Northern Midlands	—	173.6	
Nook	7306	Kentish	—	18.1	
North Bruny	7150	Kingborough	—	87.2	
North Hobart	7000	Hobart	—	1.0	
North Lilydale	7268	Launceston	13.3	14.6	
North Lilydale	7268	Dorset	1.3	14.6	
North Motton	7315	Central Coast	—	62.2	
North Scottsdale	7260	Dorset	—	131.7	
Northdown	7307	Latrobe	—	21.4	
Norwood	7250	Launceston	—	3.7	
Notley Hills	7275	West Tamar	—	11.2	
Nowhere Else	7306	Kentish	—	9.6	
Nubeena	7184	Tasman	—	58.3	
Nugara	7256	King Island	—	67.7	
Nugent	7172	Sorell	77.1	81.1	
Nugent	7172	Glamorgan-Spring Bay	4.0	81.1	
Nunamara	7259	Launceston	—	224.0	
Oakdowns	7019	Clarence	—	0.8	↑ (Top)
Oaks	7303	Meander Valley	—	13.5	
Oatlands	7120	Southern Midlands	—	210.8	
Ocean Vista	7320	Burnie	—	0.8	
Old Beach	7017	Brighton	—	23.5	
Oldina	7325	Waratah-Wynyard	—	45.2	
Oonah	7325	Waratah-Wynyard	51.4	54.5	
Oonah	7325	Burnie	3.1	54.5	
Opossum Bay	7023	Clarence	—	4.6	
Orford	7190	Glamorgan-Spring Bay	—	35.8	
Orielton	7172	Sorell	40.7	50.3	
Orielton	7172	Southern Midlands	5.3	50.3	
Orielton	7172	Clarence	4.3	50.3	
Osmaston	7303	Meander Valley	—	24.8	
Osterley	7140	Central Highlands	—	70.5	
Otago	7017	Clarence	4.4	5.5	
Otago	7017	Brighton	1.1	5.5	
Ouse	7140	Central Highlands	—	439.3	
Oyster Cove	7150	Kingborough	19.6	19.9	
Oyster Cove	7150	Huon Valley	0.3	19.9	
Palana	7255	Flinders	—	45.5	↑ (Top)
Paloona	7310	Devonport	5.1	7.8	
Paloona	7310	Kentish	2.7	7.8	
Paradise	7306	Kentish	—	40.4	
Parattah	7120	Southern Midlands	—	18.5	
Park Grove	7320	Burnie	—	2.1	
Parkham	7304	Meander Valley	115.7	118.9	
Parkham	7304	West Tamar	1.7	118.9	
Parkham	7304	Latrobe	1.5	118.9	
Parklands	7320	Burnie	—	0.8	
Parrawe	7321	Waratah-Wynyard	123.5	125.8	
Parrawe	7321	Burnie	2.3	125.8	
Patersonia	7259	Launceston	—	46.8	
Pawleena	7172	Sorell	—	48.6	
Pawtella	7120	Southern Midlands	—	28.5	
Pearshape	7256	King Island	—	47.7	
Pegarah	7256	King Island	—	143.9	
Pelham	7030	Central Highlands	33.4	37.0	
Pelham	7030	Southern Midlands	3.6	37.0	
Pelverata	7150	Huon Valley	43.5	45.4	
Pelverata	7150	Kingborough	1.9	45.4	
Penguin	7316	Central Coast	—	45.4	
Penna	7171	Sorell	—	28.7	
Perth	7300	Northern Midlands	—	72.5	
Petcheys Bay	7109	Huon Valley	—	7.1	
Pioneer	7264	Dorset	—	85.9	
Pipers Brook	7254	George Town	65.4	91.8	
Pipers Brook	7254	Launceston	18.1	91.8	
Pipers Brook	7254	Dorset	8.3	91.8	
Pipers River	7252	George Town	167.0	169.3	
Pipers River	7252	Launceston	2.3	169.3	
Plenty	7140	Derwent Valley	—	32.5	
Poatina	7302	Northern Midlands	—	28.3	
Police Point	7116	Huon Valley	—	9.3	
Pontville	7030	Brighton	9.1	16.8	
Pontville	7030	Southern Midlands	7.7	16.8	
Pontypool	7190	Glamorgan-Spring Bay	—	2.6	
Port Arthur	7182	Tasman	—	56.4	
Port Huon	7116	Huon Valley	—	8.5	
Port Latta	7321	Circular Head	—	2.3	
Port Sorell	7307	Latrobe	—	9.8	
Powranna	7300	Northern Midlands	—	34.1	
Premaydena	7185	Tasman	—	18.3	
Preolenna	7325	Waratah-Wynyard	—	53.8	
Preservation Bay	7316	Central Coast	—	0.6	
Preston	7315	Central Coast	—	41.5	
Primrose Sands	7173	Sorell	—	6.4	
Promised Land	7306	Kentish	—	8.3	
Prospect	7250	Launceston	—	6.6	
Prospect Vale	7250	Meander Valley	10.0	10.1	
Prospect Vale	7250	Launceston	0.1	10.1	
Punchbowl	7249	Launceston	—	0.6	
Pyengana	7216	Break O'Day	177.6	179.7	
Pyengana	7216	Dorset	2.1	179.7	
Quamby Bend	7292	Meander Valley	—	8.5	↑ (Top)
Quamby Brook	7304	Meander Valley	—	35.8	
Queens Domain	7000	Hobart	—	2.4	
Queenstown	7467	West Coast	—	132.0	
Quoiba	7310	Devonport	—	3.8	
Railton	7305	Kentish	69.6	70.9	↑ (Top)
Railton	7305	Latrobe	1.3	70.9	
Raminea	7109	Huon Valley	—	146.7	
Randalls Bay	7112	Huon Valley	—	3.8	
Ranelagh	7109	Huon Valley	—	32.3	
Ranga	7255	Flinders	—	67.5	
Ravenswood	7250	Launceston	—	10.2	
Recherche	7109	Huon Valley	—	79.9	
Red Hills	7304	Meander Valley	—	29.3	
Redpa	7330	Circular Head	—	138.4	
Reedy Marsh	7304	Meander Valley	—	111.3	
Reekara	7256	King Island	—	95.4	
Relbia	7258	Launceston	10.7	21.3	
Relbia	7258	Northern Midlands	10.6	21.3	
Renison Bell	7469	West Coast	—	8.5	
Retreat	7254	Launceston	29.2	45.5	
Retreat	7254	George Town	16.3	45.5	
Reynolds Neck	7304	Central Highlands	—	3.7	
Rheban	7190	Glamorgan-Spring Bay	—	114.5	
Rhyndaston	7120	Southern Midlands	—	29.5	
Riana	7316	Central Coast	—	57.9	
Richmond	7025	Clarence	—	89.8	
Ridgeway	7054	Hobart	—	6.2	
Ridgley	7321	Burnie	—	19.7	
Ringarooma	7263	Dorset	202.6	207.6	
Ringarooma	7263	Break O'Day	5.0	207.6	
Risdon	7017	Clarence	—	13.7	
Risdon Vale	7016	Clarence	—	14.6	
Riverside	7250	West Tamar	49.3	54.8	
Riverside	7250	Meander Valley	5.5	54.8	
Robigana	7275	West Tamar	—	4.3	
Rocherlea	7248	Launceston	—	30.7	
Roches Beach	7170	Clarence	—	1.7	
Rocky Cape	7321	Circular Head	63.9	65.3	
Rocky Cape	7321	Waratah-Wynyard	1.4	65.3	
Rocky Hills	7190	Glamorgan-Spring Bay	—	13.6	
Roger River	7330	Circular Head	—	74.0	
Rokeby	7019	Clarence	—	12.5	
Roland	7306	Kentish	—	13.4	
Romaine	7320	Burnie	—	7.4	
Rose Bay	7015	Clarence	—	0.9	
Rosebery	7470	West Coast	—	107.6	
Rosegarland	7140	Derwent Valley	—	9.2	
Rosetta	7010	Glenorchy	—	2.8	
Rosevale	7292	Meander Valley	33.9	35.5	
Rosevale	7292	West Tamar	1.6	35.5	
Rosevears	7277	West Tamar	—	11.9	
Rosny	7018	Clarence	—	0.8	
Rosny Park	7018	Clarence	—	0.6	
Ross	7209	Northern Midlands	—	680.8	
Rossarden	7213	Northern Midlands	125.5	141.4	
Rossarden	7213	Break O'Day	15.9	141.4	
Round Hill	7320	Burnie	—	2.4	
Rowella	7270	West Tamar	—	12.3	
Royal George	7213	Northern Midlands	262.4	565.9	
Royal George	7213	Break O'Day	153.8	565.9	
Royal George	7213	Glamorgan-Spring Bay	149.7	565.9	
Runnymede	7190	Southern Midlands	72.8	86.1	
Runnymede	7190	Glamorgan-Spring Bay	13.3	86.1	
Rushy Lagoon	7264	Dorset	—	208.2	
Saltwater River	7186	Tasman	—	34.8	↑ (Top)
Sandfly	7150	Kingborough	—	14.1	
Sandford	7020	Clarence	—	49.0	
Sandy Bay	7005	Hobart	—	6.9	
Sassafras	7307	Latrobe	149.6	153.2	
Sassafras	7307	Meander Valley	3.6	153.2	
Savage River	7321	Waratah-Wynyard	—	148.6	
Scamander	7215	Break O'Day	—	19.3	
Schouten Island	—	Glamorgan-Spring Bay	—	27.9	
Scopus	7330	Circular Head	—	29.6	
Scotchtown	7330	Circular Head	—	25.8	
Scottsdale	7260	Dorset	—	50.1	
Sea Elephant	7256	King Island	—	93.8	
Selbourne	7292	Meander Valley	46.0	50.5	
Selbourne	7292	West Tamar	4.5	50.5	
Seven Mile Beach	7170	Clarence	—	14.6	
Seymour	7215	Break O'Day	—	17.4	
Shannon	7030	Central Highlands	—	81.4	
Shearwater	7307	Latrobe	—	3.6	
Sheffield	7306	Kentish	—	60.9	
Shorewell Park	7320	Burnie	—	3.7	
Sidmouth	7270	West Tamar	—	23.8	
Simpsons Bay	7150	Kingborough	—	9.0	
Sisters Beach	7321	Waratah-Wynyard	—	8.1	
Sisters Creek	7325	Waratah-Wynyard	25.9	31.9	
Sisters Creek	7325	Circular Head	6.0	31.9	
Sloping Main	7186	Tasman	—	46.8	
Smithton	7330	Circular Head	—	90.9	
Snug	7054	Kingborough	21.4	23.1	
Snug	7054	Huon Valley	1.7	23.1	
Somerset	7322	Waratah-Wynyard	—	26.9	
Sorell	7172	Sorell	—	22.0	
Sorell Creek	7140	Derwent Valley	—	8.0	
South Arm	7022	Clarence	—	9.2	
South Bruny	7150	Kingborough	—	206.7	
South Burnie	7320	Burnie	—	1.7	
South Forest	7330	Circular Head	—	26.0	
South Hobart	7004	Hobart	—	9.2	
South Launceston	7249	Launceston	—	2.8	
South Mount Cameron	7264	Dorset	—	99.2	
South Nietta	7315	Central Coast	36.6	55.5	
South Nietta	7315	Kentish	18.9	55.5	
South Preston	7315	Central Coast	—	17.3	
South Riana	7316	Central Coast	—	33.3	
South Spreyton	7310	Kentish	—	4.2	
South Springfield	7260	Dorset	—	48.6	
Southport	7109	Huon Valley	—	34.5	
Southport Lagoon	7109	Huon Valley	—	25.4	
South West	—	Derwent Valley	3,837.1	13,190.0	
South West	—	Huon Valley	2,702.2	13,190.0	
South West	—	West Coast	5,747.1	13,190.0	
South West	—	Central Highlands	903.6	13,190.0	
Spalford	7315	Central Coast	—	4.2	
Sprent	7315	Central Coast	—	31.3	
Spreyton	7310	Devonport	8.8	11.8	
Spreyton	7310	Latrobe	3.0	11.8	
Spring Beach	7190	Glamorgan-Spring Bay	—	9.0	
Springfield	7260	Dorset	70.5	81.0	
Springfield	7260	Launceston	10.5	81.0	
Squeaking Point	7307	Latrobe	—	2.3	
St Helens	7216	Break O'Day	—	224.0	
St Leonards	7250	Launceston	—	44.7	
St Marys	7215	Break O'Day	—	191.9	
Stanley	7331	Circular Head	—	18.0	
Staverton	7306	Kentish	—	21.0	
Steppes	7030	Central Highlands	—	210.0	
Stieglitz	7216	Break O'Day	—	9.0	
Stonehenge	7120	Southern Midlands	—	127.3	
Stonor	7119	Southern Midlands	—	45.2	
Stony Head	7252	George Town	—	55.0	
Stony Rise	7310	Devonport	—	3.1	
Stoodley	7306	Kentish	—	9.2	
Stormlea	7184	Tasman	—	15.1	
Stowport	7321	Burnie	—	30.5	
Strahan	7468	West Coast	—	311.5	
Strathblane	7109	Huon Valley	—	83.2	
Strathgordon	7139	Derwent Valley	—	2.9	
Strickland	7140	Central Highlands	—	56.1	
Strzelecki	7255	Flinders	—	70.1	
Styx	7140	Derwent Valley	—	245.5	
Sulphur Creek	7316	Central Coast	—	9.8	
Summerhill	7250	Launceston	2.3	2.4	
Summerhill	7250	Meander Valley	0.1	2.4	
Sunnyside	7305	Kentish	—	15.7	
Surges Bay	7116	Huon Valley	—	8.3	
Surprise Bay	7256	King Island	—	37.4	
Surveyors Bay	7116	Huon Valley	—	10.8	
Swan Bay	7252	Launceston	—	13.6	
Swan Point	7275	West Tamar	—	1.8	
Swansea	7190	Glamorgan-Spring Bay	—	245.4	
Swanston	7120	Southern Midlands	—	96.1	
Table Cape	7325	Waratah-Wynyard	—	11.5	↑ (Top)
Takone	7325	Waratah-Wynyard	—	44.3	
Talawa	7263	Dorset	—	12.7	
Taranna	7180	Tasman	—	19.0	
Targa	7259	Launceston	—	30.6	
Tarleton	7310	Latrobe	—	5.8	
Taroona	7053	Kingborough	—	5.1	
Tarraleah	7140	Central Highlands	—	164.2	
Tayene	7259	Launceston	108.8	159.2	
Tayene	7259	Dorset	46.9	159.2	
Tayene	7259	Break O'Day	3.5	159.2	
Tea Tree	7017	Brighton	48.3	76.3	
Tea Tree	7017	Southern Midlands	28.0	76.3	
Telita	7264	Dorset	—	12.4	
Temma	7330	Circular Head	—	74.6	
Tewkesbury	7321	Burnie	—	81.8	
The Gardens	7216	Break O'Day	—	58.8	
Thirlstane	7307	Latrobe	—	16.0	
Three Hummock Island	7330	Circular Head	—	69.9	
Tiberias	7120	Southern Midlands	—	17.8	
Tinderbox	7054	Kingborough	—	10.3	
Tods Corner	7030	Central Highlands	—	13.4	
Togari	7330	Circular Head	—	244.2	
Toiberry	7301	Northern Midlands	—	12.2	
Tolmans Hill	7007	Hobart	—	1.3	
Tomahawk	7262	Dorset	—	90.8	
Tonganah	7260	Dorset	—	32.1	
Tooms Lake	7209	Northern Midlands	254.5	397.9	
Tooms Lake	7209	Glamorgan-Spring Bay	141.0	397.9	
Tooms Lake	7209	Southern Midlands	2.4	397.9	
Tranmere	7018	Clarence	—	2.8	
Travellers Rest	7250	Meander Valley	6.0	6.1	
Travellers Rest	7250	Northern Midlands	0.1	6.1	
Trenah	7263	Dorset	—	62.3	
Trevallyn	7250	West Tamar	7.2	9.7	
Trevallyn	7250	Launceston	2.5	9.7	
Triabunna	7190	Glamorgan-Spring Bay	—	173.9	
Trial Harbour	7469	West Coast	—	19.4	
Trowutta	7330	Circular Head	—	124.2	
Tugrah	7310	Devonport	—	5.3	
Tulendeena	7260	Dorset	—	8.5	
Tullah	7321	West Coast	—	47.2	
Tunbridge	7120	Northern Midlands	70.9	117.7	
Tunbridge	7120	Southern Midlands	46.8	117.7	
Tunnack	7120	Southern Midlands	—	62.2	
Tunnel	7254	Launceston	—	13.2	
Turners Beach	7315	Central Coast	—	6.9	
Turners Marsh	7267	Launceston	—	53.6	
Tyenna	7140	Derwent Valley	—	33.6	
Ulverstone	7315	Central Coast	—	16.7	↑ (Top)
Underwood	7268	Launceston	—	89.7	
Upper Blessington	7212	Launceston	132.8	168.9	
Upper Blessington	7212	Break O'Day	36.1	168.9	
Upper Burnie	7320	Burnie	—	1.2	
Upper Castra	7315	Central Coast	—	33.5	
Upper Esk	7214	Break O'Day	158.9	197.8	
Upper Esk	7214	Dorset	38.9	197.8	
Upper Natone	7321	Burnie	—	68.4	
Upper Scamander	7215	Break O'Day	—	98.5	
Upper Stowport	7321	Burnie	—	15.8	
Upper Woodstock	7150	Huon Valley	—	12.8	
Uxbridge	7140	Derwent Valley	—	42.6	
Verona Sands	7112	Huon Valley	—	1.6	↑ (Top)
Victoria Valley	7140	Central Highlands	—	132.6	
Waddamana	7030	Central Highlands	—	211.8	↑ (Top)
Walls of Jerusalem	7304	Meander Valley	333.2	517.7	
Walls of Jerusalem	7304	Central Highlands	184.5	517.7	
Waratah	7321	Waratah-Wynyard	—	120.3	
Warrane	7018	Clarence	—	4.0	
Warrentinna	7261	Dorset	—	36.3	
Waterhouse	7262	Dorset	—	302.9	
Waterloo	7109	Huon Valley	—	6.5	
Wattle Grove	7109	Huon Valley	—	7.4	
Wattle Hill	7172	Sorell	—	46.6	
Waverley	7250	Launceston	—	10.7	
Wayatinah	7140	Central Highlands	—	60.7	
Weegena	7304	Kentish	20.6	39.4	
Weegena	7304	Meander Valley	18.8	39.4	
Weetah	7304	Meander Valley	—	17.1	
Weldborough	7264	Break O'Day	92.9	95.5	
Weldborough	7264	Dorset	2.6	95.5	
Wellington Park	7054	Derwent Valley	73.6	179.8	
Wellington Park	7054	Glenorchy	41.0	179.8	
Wellington Park	7054	Kingborough	31.8	179.8	
Wellington Park	7054	Hobart	17.2	179.8	
Wellington Park	7054	Huon Valley	16.2	179.8	
Wesley Vale	7307	Latrobe	—	28.7	
West Coast	—	West Coast	2,271.7	5,979.0	
West Coast	—	Circular Head	2,066.3	5,979.0	
West Coast	—	Waratah-Wynyard	1,623.4	5,979.0	
West Coast	—	Kentish	17.6	5,979.0	
West Hobart	7000	Hobart	—	3.9	
West Kentish	7306	Kentish	—	17.9	
West Launceston	7250	Launceston	—	3.9	
West Montagu	7330	Circular Head	—	140.8	
West Moonah	7009	Glenorchy	1.8	1.9	
West Moonah	7009	Hobart	0.1	1.9	
West Mooreville	7321	Burnie	—	16.0	
West Pine	7316	Central Coast	—	13.6	
West Ridgley	7321	Burnie	—	27.0	
West Scottsdale	7260	Dorset	—	22.4	
West Takone	7325	Waratah-Wynyard	117.1	124.4	
West Takone	7325	Circular Head	7.3	124.4	
West Ulverstone	7315	Central Coast	—	17.8	
Westbury	7303	Meander Valley	—	92.5	
Western Creek	7304	Meander Valley	—	58.9	
Western Junction	7212	Northern Midlands	—	14.8	
Westerway	7140	Derwent Valley	20.6	32.9	
Westerway	7140	Central Highlands	12.3	32.9	
Westwood	7292	Meander Valley	—	76.4	
Weymouth	7252	George Town	—	28.0	
White Beach	7184	Tasman	—	30.6	
White Hills	7258	Launceston	48.9	56.1	
White Hills	7258	Northern Midlands	7.2	56.1	
Whitefoord	7120	Southern Midlands	—	32.2	
Whitemark	7255	Flinders	—	105.5	
Whitemore	7303	Meander Valley	—	43.8	
Wickham	7256	King Island	—	41.0	
Wilburville	7030	Central Highlands	—	4.6	
Wilmot	7310	Kentish	—	66.6	
Wiltshire	7321	Circular Head	—	12.2	
Windermere	7252	Launceston	—	6.6	
Wingaroo	7255	Flinders	—	175.7	
Winkleigh	7275	West Tamar	—	44.8	
Winnaleah	7265	Dorset	—	71.7	
Wivenhoe	7320	Burnie	—	1.6	
Woodbridge	7162	Kingborough	—	16.3	
Woodbury	7120	Southern Midlands	—	136.0	
Woodsdale	7120	Southern Midlands	87.5	94.5	
Woodsdale	7120	Glamorgan-Spring Bay	7.0	94.5	
Woodstock	7109	Huon Valley	—	4.0	
Woolnorth	7330	Circular Head	—	209.1	
Wyena	7254	Launceston	16.2	29.0	
Wyena	7254	Dorset	12.8	29.0	
Wynyard	7325	Waratah-Wynyard	—	53.4	
Yambacoona	7256	King Island	—	106.2	↑ (Top)
Yarra Creek	7256	King Island	—	28.8	
Yolla	7325	Waratah-Wynyard	—	32.5	
York Plains	7120	Southern Midlands	—	99.8	
York Town	7270	West Tamar	18.1	22.2	
York Town	7270	Latrobe	4.1	22.2	
Youngtown	7249	Launceston	4.7	4.9	
Youngtown	7249	Northern Midlands	0.2	4.9	
Zeehan	7469	West Coast	—	90.7	↑ (Top)

== See also ==
- List of Hobart suburbs
