= Tods Corner, Tasmania =

Tods Corner
- Town
- Coordinates: 41°58′09″S 146°48′00″E
- Country: Australia
- State: Tasmania
- Region: Central
- LGA: Central Highlands
- Location: 87 km (54 mi) N of Hamilton

Government
  - State electorate: Lyons
  - Federal division: Lyons

Population
  - Total: 8 (2016 census)
- Postcode: 7030
Localities around Tods Corner
Great Lake	Central Plateau	Central Plateau
Great Lake	Tods Corner	Central Plateau
Miena	Miena	Arthurs Lake

Tods Corner is a rural locality in the local government area of Central Highlands in the Central region of Tasmania. The locality is about 87 kilometres (54 mi) north of the town of Hamilton. The 2016 census recorded a population of 8 for the state suburb of Tods Corner.

== History ==
Tods Corner is a confirmed suburb/locality. The name has been in use since 1848 (Placenames Tasmania 1357D) and is believed to be that of an early settler.

== Geography ==
The Great Lake forms part of the western boundary. Tods Corner Power Station is in the locality. The adjacent arm of Great Lake is also called Tods Corner.
