= Pterostylis pratensis =

Liawenee greenhood

Conservation status
- Vulnerable (EPBC Act)

Scientific classification
- Kingdom: Plantae
- Clade: Tracheophytes
- Clade: Angiosperms
- Clade: Monocots
- Order: Asparagales
- Family: Orchidaceae
- Subfamily: Orchidoideae
- Tribe: Cranichideae
- Genus: Pterostylis
- Species: P. pratensis

Binomial name
- Pterostylis pratensis D.L.Jones

Synonyms
- Hymenochilus pratensis (D.L.Jones) D.L.Jones; Oligochaetochilus pratensis (D.L.Jones) Szlach.

Species of orchid

Pterostylis pratensis, commonly known as the Liawenee greenhood, is a plant in the orchid family Orchidaceae and is endemic to Tasmania. Both flowering and non-flowering plants have a rosette of leaves lying flat on the ground. Flowering plants have up to twelve crowded white flowers with prominent green stripes. This greenhood only grows in low, exposed subalpine tussock grassland.

== Description ==
Pterostylis pratensis, is a terrestrial, perennial, deciduous, herb with an underground tuber. It has a rosette of between four and eight, egg-shaped leaves, each leaf 25–35 mm (0.98–1.4 in) long and 14–22 mm (0.6–0.9 in) wide lying flat on the ground. Between two and twelve crowded flowers are borne on a flowering spike 70–150 mm (3–6 in) high with two to six stem leaves wrapped around it. The flowers are white with prominent green stripes and 7–9 mm (0.3–0.4 in) long and about 5 mm (0.2 in) wide. The dorsal sepal and petals are joined to form a hood called the "galea" over the column. The dorsal sepal is gently curved but suddenly curves downward near the tip and is about the same length as the petals. The lateral sepals turn downwards and are about 7 mm (0.3 in) long, 5 mm (0.2 in) wide, cupped with short tips about 3 mm (0.1 in) apart from each other. The labellum is 2–3 mm (0.08–0.1 in) long, about 2 mm (0.08 in) wide and whitish-green with a dark green, beak-like appendage. Flowering occurs from November to December.

== Taxonomy and naming ==
Pterostylis pratensis was first formally described in 1998 by David Jones from a specimen collected near Great Lake and the description was published in Australian Orchid Research. The specific epithet (pratensis) is a Latin word meaning "found in meadows" referring to the highland habitat of this greenhood.

== Distribution and habitat ==
Liawenee greenhood grows in Poa labillardierei tussock grassland at altitudes of 850–1,100 m (2,800–3,600 ft) in exposed situations on the Central Plateau.

== Conservation ==
Pterostylis pratensis is listed as "vulnerable" under the Australian Government Environment Protection and Biodiversity Conservation Act 1999 and the Tasmanian Government Threatened Species Protection Act 1995. There are eleven known populations of the species, only two of which are in conservation reserves. Determining population size is difficult but was estimated in 2008 to be at least 600. Threats to the species include grazing, cultivation and the use of fertilisers.
