= Wihareja =

Previous town name for Shannon in Tasmania

Wihareja was a rural locality in the local government area (LGA) of the Central Highlands Council near the Central Great Lake and in the Central Highlands in Tasmania. There is a creek named after the area. The creek is called Wihareja Creek. Wihareja was renamed and is now called Shannon.
