= Tods Corner =

Tods Corner may refer to:

- Tods Corner Power Station
- Tods Corner, Tasmania
