= Arthurs Lake, Tasmania =

Arthurs Lake
- Town
- Coordinates: 42°01′36″S 146°52′44″E
- Country: Australia
- State: Tasmania
- Region: Central
- LGA: Central Highlands
- Location: 87 km (54 mi) N of Hamilton

Government
  - State electorate: Lyons
  - Federal division: Lyons

Population
  - Total: 9 (2021 census)
- Postcode: 7030
Localities around Arthurs Lake
Central Plateau	Cressy, Central Plateau	Cressy
Tods Corner, Miena, Central Plateau	Arthurs Lake	Millers Bluff
Steppes, Miena	Wilburville, Steppes	Interlaken

Arthurs Lake is a rural locality in the local government area of Central Highlands in the Central region of Tasmania. It is located about 87 kilometres (54 mi) north of the town of Hamilton. The 2021 census recorded a population of 9 for Arthurs Lake.

== History ==
Arthurs Lake is a confirmed suburb/locality.

== Geography ==
Arthurs Lake (the body of water) is fully enclosed by the locality. The small localities of Flintstone and Morass Bay, on the shores of the lake, are fully enclosed by the locality of Arthurs Lake.

== Road infrastructure ==
The B51 route (Poatina Road) enters from the south-west and exits to the west. Route C525 (Arthurs Lake Road) starts at an intersection with B51 near Flintstone and runs south and east through Wilburville to the Morass Bay Conservation Area.
