= Shannon, Tasmania =

Shannon
- Town
- Coordinates: 42°02′51″S 146°45′24″E
- Country: Australia
- State: Tasmania
- Region: Central
- LGA: Central Highlands
- Location: 85 km (53 mi) N of Hamilton

Government
  - State electorate: Lyons
  - Federal division: Lyons

Area
  - Total: 81.55 km^{2} (31.49 sq mi)

Population
  - Total: 0 (2021 census)
  - Density: 0.000/km^{2} (0.000/sq mi)
- Postcode: 7030
Localities around Shannon
Miena	Miena	Steppes
Miena	Shannon	Steppes
Waddamana	Waddamana	Waddamana

Shannon is a rural locality in the local government area (LGA) of Central Highlands in the Central LGA region of Tasmania, Australia. The locality is about 85 kilometres (53 mi) north of the town of Hamilton. The 2016 census did not record a population for the state suburb of Shannon, because it "had no people or a very low population".

== History ==
Shannon was gazetted as a locality in 1973. The locality was originally called Wihareja. The settlement is about 500m east of the original Shannon Power Station and associated Shannon settlement that were closed in 1930's.

== Geography ==
The Shannon River forms the southern boundary of the development.

== Road infrastructure ==
Route C178 (Waddamana Road) runs to the east of Shannon (about 400m from the town) from north to south.
