= Little Pine Lagoon =

- Town
- Coordinates: 42°00′06″S 146°36′36″E
- Country: Australia
- State: Tasmania
- Region: Central
- LGA: Central Highlands
- Location: 101 km (63 mi) N of Hamilton

Government
  - State electorate: Lyons
  - Federal division: Lyons

Population
  - Total: nil (2016 census)
- Postcode: 7140
Localities around Little Pine Lagoon
Central Plateau	Central Plateau	Miena
Central Plateau	Little Pine Lagoon	Miena
Bronte Park	Bronte Park	Bronte Park

Little Pine Lagoon is a rural locality in the local government area (LGA) of Central Highlands in the Central LGA region of Tasmania. The locality is about 101 kilometres (63 mi) north of the town of Hamilton. The 2016 census recorded a population of nil for the state suburb of Little Pine Lagoon.

== History ==
Little Pine Lagoon is a confirmed locality and a body of water (the lagoon).

== Geography ==
The River Ouse forms much of the eastern boundary. The Little Pine River forms part of the western boundary before flowing east to the lagoon, which is retained by the Little Pine Dam.

== Road infrastructure ==
Route B11 (Marlborough Road) runs through from north-east to south.
