= Waddamana =

- Town
- Coordinates: 42°07′S 146°44′E
- Country: Australia
- State: Tasmania
- Region: Central
- LGA: Central Highlands
- Location: 112 km (70 mi) NW of Hobart; 101 km (63 mi) S of Deloraine; 30 km (19 mi) S of Miena; 64 km (40 mi) N of Hamilton

Government
  - State electorate: Lyons
  - Federal division: Lyons

Population
  - Total: 3 (SAL 2021)
- Postcode: 7030
Localities around Waddamana
Miena	Shannon	Steppes
London Lakes	Waddamana	Steppes
London Lakes	Victoria Valley	Victoria Valley

Waddamana is a rural locality in the local government area (LGA) of Central Highlands in the Central LGA region of Tasmania. The locality is about 64 kilometres (40 mi) north of the town of Hamilton. It is a former 'hydro-town', at the foot of the southern side of the Central Plateau of Tasmania. The 2016 census population was 4 for the state suburb of Waddamana. At the 2021 census there was no population recorded.

== History ==
Waddamana was gazetted as a locality in 1973.

It flourished with a population of over 100 in the early 1900s when the power plant situated there was being built. Waddamana Post Office opened on 18 August 1913 and closed in 1971.

It contains two decommissioned hydro-electric power stations (see Waddamana Power Stations), one of which is a museum, and several cottages, most of which are only used by guests. Schools often take their students to Waddamana for camps. It has gained a reputation for its harsh weather - it often snows and icing was a problem when the hydro plants were still in use.

In 1991, the whole town was bought by Helen and Frank Cooper, who operated the camp for children and others until they sold that side of the town in about 2014.

In 2021, the Cooper's side of town was bought by Llyr and Kurt Otto, sight unseen due to COVID-19 restrictions on travel. They are the only permanent residents. They rent some houses to temporary workers at a nearby wind farm, and operate tourist facilities on weekends: a coffee van with home-made baked goods.

The Tasmanian Aboriginal name waddamana means 'noisy water'.

== Geography ==
Lake Echo forms part of the western boundary. The River Ouse flows through from north to south.

== Road infrastructure ==
Route C178 (Waddamana Road) passes through from north to south-east. Route C177 (Bashan Road) starts at an intersection with C178 and runs south until it exits.

== See also ==
- Lake Echo Power Station
