= Percy Lewis =

Percy Lewis may refer to:

- Percy Lewis (Australian cricketer) (1864–1922), Australian cricketer, played first-class cricket Victoria 1883–96
- Percy Lewis, known as Plum Lewis (1884–1976), South African cricketer who played in one Test in 1913
- Percy Lewis (boxer) (1927–2019), Trinidad and Tobago/British boxer
- Percy Lewis (football manager), English football manager
- Percy Parke Lewis (1885–1962), American architect
