= Morass Bay =

- Town
- Coordinates: 42°01′32″S 146°56′41″E
- Country: Australia
- State: Tasmania
- Region: Central
- LGA: Central Highlands
- Location: 93 km (58 mi) N of Hamilton

Government
  - State electorate: Lyons
  - Federal division: Lyons

Population
  - Total: 4 (2016 census)
- Postcode: 7030
Localities around Morass Bay
Arthurs Lake	Arthurs Lake	Arthurs Lake
Arthurs Lake	Morass Bay	Arthurs Lake
Arthurs Lake	Arthurs Lake	Arthurs Lake

Morass Bay is a rural locality in the local government area (LGA) of Central Highlands in the Central LGA region of Tasmania. The locality is about 93 kilometres (58 mi) north of the town of Hamilton. The 2016 census recorded a population of 4 for the state suburb of Morass Bay.

== History ==
Morass Bay is a confirmed locality.

== Geography ==
The waters of Arthurs Lake form the north-western boundary.

== Road infrastructure ==
Route C525 (Arthurs Lake Road) runs through from south to south-west.
