= Cramps Bay =

- Town
- Coordinates: 41°52′12″S 146°49′38″E
- Country: Australia
- State: Tasmania
- Region: Central
- LGA: Central Highlands
- Location: 99 km (62 mi) N of Hamilton

Government
  - State electorate: Lyons
  - Federal division: Lyons

Population
  - Total: nil (2016 census)
- Postcode: 7030
Localities around Cramps Bay
Great Lake	Central Plateau	Central Plateau
Great Lake	Cramps Bay	Central Plateau
Central Plateau	Central Plateau	Central Plateau

Cramps Bay is a rural locality in the local government area (LGA) of Central Highlands in the Central LGA region of Tasmania. The locality is about 99 kilometres (62 mi) north of the town of Hamilton. The 2016 census recorded a population of nil for the state suburb of Cramps Bay.

== History ==
Cramps Bay is a confirmed locality.

== Geography ==
The waters of the Great Lake form almost all of the western boundary.

== Road infrastructure ==
Route B51 (Poatina Road) runs through from north-east to south-east.
