= Lake Sorell =

- Town
- Coordinates: 42°06′36″S 147°10′22″E
- Country: Australia
- State: Tasmania
- Region: Central
- LGA: Central Highlands, Northern Midlands
- Location: 91 km (57 mi) NE of Hamilton

Government
  - State electorate: Lyons
  - Federal division: Lyons

Population
  - Total: nil (2016 census)
- Postcode: 7030
Localities around Lake Sorell
Millers Bluff	Millers Bluff	Ross
Arthurs Lake	Lake Sorell	Ross
Interlaken	Interlaken	Interlaken

Lake Sorell is a rural locality in the local government areas (LGA) of Central Highlands and Northern Midlands in the Central LGA region of Tasmania. The locality is about 91 kilometres (57 mi) north-east of the town of Hamilton. The 2016 census recorded a population of nil for the state suburb of Lake Sorell.

== History ==
Lake Sorell is a confirmed locality.

== Geography ==
About half of Lake Sorell (the body of water) is within the locality.

== Road infrastructure ==
Route C527 (Interlaken Road) passes to the south.
