= Steppes, Tasmania =

Steppes
- Town
- Coordinates: 42°02′01″S 146°48′01″E
- Country: Australia
- State: Tasmania
- Region: Central
- LGA: Central Highlands
- Location: 80 km (50 mi) N of Hamilton

Government
  - State electorate: Lyons
  - Federal division: Lyons

Population
  - Total: nil (2016 census)
- Postcode: 7030
Localities around Steppes
| Miena | Arthurs Lake, Wilburville | Interlaken |
| Shannon | Steppes | Interlaken |
| Waddamana | Bothwell | Bothwell |

Steppes is a rural locality in the local government area of Central Highlands in the Central region of Tasmania. It is located about 80 kilometres (50 mi) north of the town of Hamilton. The 2016 census determined a population of nil for the state suburb of Steppes.

Steppes is home to the Steppes Sculptures, 14 bronze sculptures that signify something of significance to the region, as well as the Steppes Homestead, which was used for sheep grazing in the 19th century. These sculptures were designed by Stephen Walker, who also designed the whale sculpture at Cockle Creek.

== History ==
Steppes is a confirmed suburb/locality.

== Geography ==
The Shannon River forms most of the western boundary.

== Road infrastructure ==
The A5 route (Highland Lakes Road) passes through from south to north. Route B51 (Poatina Road) starts at an intersection with A5 and exits to the north. Route C178 (Waddamana Road) starts at an intersection with A5 and runs south-west before exiting. Route C527 (Interlaken Road) starts at an intersection with A5 and runs south-east before exiting.
