= Flintstone, Tasmania =

Flintstone Tasmania
- Coordinates: 41°59′52″S 146°51′33″E
- Population: 4 (2016 census)
- Postcode(s): 7030
- Location: 84 km (52 mi) N of Hamilton
- LGA(s): Central Highlands
- Region: Central
- State electorate(s): Lyons
- Federal division(s): Lyons
Localities around Flintstone:
Arthurs Lake	Arthurs Lake (the locality)	Arthurs Lake (the lake)
Arthurs Lake	Flintstone	Arthurs Lake
Arthurs Lake	Arthurs Lake	Arthurs Lake

Flintstone is a small rural residential locality in the local government area of Central Highlands in the Central region of Tasmania. It is located about 84 kilometres (52 mi) north of the town of Hamilton. The 2016 census determined a population of 4 for the state suburb of Flintstone.

== History ==
Flintstone is a confirmed suburb/locality. It was so named by locals because of sharp stones in the area.

== Geography ==
Flintstone is fully enclosed by the locality of Arthurs Lake. The north-eastern boundary is the shore of the lake (Arthurs Lake).

== Road infrastructure ==
The C525 route (Arthurs Lake Road) skirts the south-western boundary of Flintstone.
