= Wilburville =

- Town
- Coordinates: 42°02′52″S 146°53′48″E
- Country: Australia
- State: Tasmania
- Region: Central
- LGA: Central Highlands
- Location: 90 km (56 mi) N of Hamilton

Government
  - State electorate: Lyons
  - Federal division: Lyons

Population
  - Total: 16 (2016 census)
- Postcode: 7030
Localities around Wilburville
Arthurs Lake	Arthurs Lake (the lake)	Arthurs Lake
Arthurs Lake (the locality), Steppes	Wilburville	Arthurs Lake, Steppes
Steppes	Steppes	Steppes

Wilburville is a small rural residential locality in the local government area of Central Highlands in the Central region of Tasmania. It is located about 90 kilometres (56 mi) north of the town of Hamilton. The 2016 census determined a population of 16 for the state suburb of Wilburville.

== History ==
Wilburville is a confirmed suburb/locality. It was so named for the unofficial caretaker of shacks over many years, Wilbur Anderson.

== Geography ==
The northern boundary is the shore of Arthurs Lake (the lake).

== Road infrastructure ==
The C525 route (Arthurs Lake Road) passes through from west to east.
