= Central Highlands Council =

- Local government area
- Interactive map of Central Highlands Council
- Coordinates: 42.2124°S 146.646°E
- Country: Australia
- State: Tasmania
- Region: Central Highlands
- Established: 2 April 1993
- Council seat: Hamilton

Government
  - Mayor: Loueen Triffitt
  - State electorate: Lyons
  - Federal division: Lyons

Area
  - Total: 7,982 km^{2} (3,082 sq mi)
- Website: Central Highlands Council
LGAs around Central Highlands Council
West Coast	Meander Valley	Northern Midlands
West Coast	Central Highlands Council	Southern Midlands
West Coast	Derwent Valley	Southern Midlands

Central Highlands Council is a local government body in Tasmania, encompassing the Central Highlands region of the state. Central Highlands is classified as a rural local government area and has a population of 2,144, the two largest towns are Bothwell and Hamilton.

== History and attributes ==
Central Highlands was established on 2 April 1993 after the amalgamation of the Bothwell and Hamilton municipalities.

Central Highlands is the least densely populated local government area of Tasmania, with only 0.3 people per square kilometre. The municipality is classified as rural, agricultural and medium (RAM) under the Australian Classification of Local Governments.

=== Towns ===
The population of the area is small and quite decentralised, resulting in a large number of small towns. Some of these towns were founded as support sites for workers on the hydro-electric dams scattered along the upper River Derwent. Main towns are considered Hamilton (council headquarters) and Bothwell.

The towns (with population as of 2006):

- Bothwell (376)
- Bronte Park (16)
- Derwent Bridge (?)
- Hamilton (300)
- Liawenee (?)
- Miena (104)
- Ouse (137)
- Tarraleah

=== Townships ===
The municipality is subdivided into eight townships:

1. Hamilton Township
2. Ouse Township
3. Gretna Township
4. Ellendale Township
5. Fentonbury Township
6. Westerway Township
7. Wayatinah Township
8. Bothwell Township

=== Other localities ===
• Apsley • Arthurs Lake • Bradys Lake • Brandum • Breona • Butlers Gorge • Central Plateau • Cramps Bay • Dee • Doctors Point • Elderslie • Flintstone • Florentine • Hermitage • Hollow Tree • Interlaken • Lake Sorell • Lake St Clair • Little Pine Lagoon • London Lakes • Lower Marshes • Meadowbank • Melton Mowbray • Millers Bluff • Morass Bay • Mount Field • National Park • Osterley • Pelham • Reynolds Neck • Shannon • Southwest • Steppes • Strickland • Tods Corner • Victoria Valley • Waddamana • Walls of Jerusalem • Wilburville • Wihareja

=== Parks and reserves ===
It covers most of the mountainous centre of the state, also known as the Central Plateau which contains the Central Plateau Conservation Area including sections of the Tasmanian Wilderness World Heritage Area, as well as the Cradle Mountain-Lake St Clair National Park, and Walls of Jerusalem National Park. Other smaller reserves of different status occur in the region as well.

== Council ==
=== Current composition ===
Name	Position	Party affiliation
Loueen Triffitt	Mayor/Councillor	Independent
Jim Allwright	Deputy Mayor/Councillor	Independent
Tony Bailey	Councillor	Independent
Scott Bowden	Councillor	Independent
Robert Cassidy	Councillor	Independent
John Hall	Councillor	Independent
Julie Honner	Councillor	Independent
David Meacheam	Councillor	Independent
Yvonne Miller	Councillor	Independent

=== 2022 election results ===
2022 Tasmanian local elections: Central Highlands
Party	Candidate	Votes	%	±%
Independent	Loueen Triffitt (elected)	728	36.18	
Independent	Jim Allwright (elected)	298	14.81	
Independent	Tony Bailey (elected)	159	7.90	
Independent	John Hall (elected)	143	7.11	
Independent	Robert Cassidy (elected)	134	6.66	
Independent	David Meacheam (elected)	112	5.57	
Independent	Julie Honner (elected)	109	5.42	
Independent	Rob Wilkinson	106	5.27	
Independent	Scott Bowden (elected)	104	5.17	
Independent	Yvonne Miller (elected)	75	3.73	
Independent	Anthony Archer	44	2.19	
Total formal votes		2,012	96.27	
Informal votes		78	3.73	
Turnout		2,090	83.63	

== See also ==
- List of local government areas of Tasmania
