= Interlaken, Tasmania =

Locality in Tasmania, Australia

Interlaken
- Town
- Coordinates: 42°09′40″S 147°08′41″E
- Country: Australia
- State: Tasmania
- Region: Central
- LGA: Northern Midlands, Central Highlands, Southern Midlands
- Location: 63 km (39 mi) NE of Hamilton

Government
  - State electorate: Lyons
  - Federal division: Lyons

Population
  - Total: 24 (2016 census)
- Postcode: 7030
Localities around Interlaken
Arthurs Lake	Lake Sorell	Ross
Bothwell, Steppes	Interlaken	Tunbridge, Woodbury
Bothwell	Bothwell, Oatlands	Oatlands

Interlaken is a rural locality in the local government areas of Northern Midlands, Central Highlands, and Southern Midlands in the Central region of Tasmania. It is located about 63 kilometres (39 mi) north-east of the town of Hamilton. The 2016 census determined a population of 24 for the state suburb of Interlaken.

== History ==
Interlaken was gazetted as a locality in 1973. The name has been in use since 1837. It is believed to be derived from a town in Switzerland with similar alpine lake surroundings.

== Geography ==
Lake Crescent is within the locality, and Lake Sorell forms much of the northern boundary.

== Road infrastructure ==
The C527 route (Interlaken Road) enters from the west and runs through to the south-east before exiting. Route C526 (Tunbridge Tier Road) starts at an intersection with C527 and runs east before exiting. Route C528 (Dennistoun Road) starts at an intersection with C527 and runs south before exiting.
