= Ouse, Tasmania =

Ouse
- Town
- Coordinates: 42°29′S 146°43′E
- Country: Australia
- State: Tasmania
- LGA: Central Highlands Council
- Location: 95 km (59 mi) NW of Hobart; 58 km (36 mi) NW of New Norfolk
- Established: 1842

Government
  - State electorate: Lyons
  - Federal division: Lyons
- Elevation: 150 m (490 ft)

Population
  - Total: 303 (2016 census)
- Postcode: 7140
- Mean max temp: 18.4 °C (65.1 °F)
- Mean min temp: 5.6 °C (42.1 °F)
- Annual rainfall: 511.1 mm (20.12 in)

Ouse (/uːz/ OOZ) is a small town in the Central Highlands local government area of Tasmania, Australia, on the Lyell Highway. At the 2016 census, Ouse had a population of 303.

== History ==
Ouse is the settlement where convicts James Goodwin and Thomas Connolly broke out of the South West Wilderness four weeks after their escape from Sarah Island. Ouse Post Office opened on 1 October 1835.

The town briefly made national headlines in August 2006 when the Ouse District Hospital, originally established as a Bush Nursing Centre and reconstituted in its present form in 1956, was downgraded to a community health centre.

== Education ==
Ouse District School is a public school which caters for students from Kindergarten to grade 6.

== Climate ==
Ouse has an oceanic climate (Köppen: Cfb), with mild, dry summers and cool, somewhat damp winters. Average maxima vary from 25.6 °C (78.1 °F) in January to 11.7 °C (53.1 °F) in July while average minima fluctuate between 10.4 °C (50.7 °F) in January and 1.2 °C (34.2 °F) in July. Due to its inland location and being downwind of the Central Highlands, midsummer freezes have been recorded, while foehn winds occur (primarily in summer). Mean annual precipitation is quite low, 511.1 mm (20.12 in) spread on 148.4 days, and is concentrated in winter. Snow is not uncommon.

Extreme temperatures have ranged from −7.8 °C (18.0 °F) on 24 June 2013 to 40.7 °C (105.3 °F) on 11 January 2010. Climate data are sourced from the local Fire Station.

Climate data for Ouse Fire Station (42º28'48"S, 146º42'36"E, 90 m AMSL) (1998–2024)
Month	Jan	Feb	Mar	Apr	May	Jun	Jul	Aug	Sep	Oct	Nov	Dec	Year
Record high °C (°F)	40.7 (105.3)	39.0 (102.2)	37.9 (100.2)	31.4 (88.5)	26.0 (78.8)	19.3 (66.7)	19.6 (67.3)	22.5 (72.5)	27.1 (80.8)	32.0 (89.6)	35.0 (95.0)	40.0 (104.0)	40.7 (105.3)
Mean daily maximum °C (°F)	25.6 (78.1)	24.9 (76.8)	22.3 (72.1)	18.4 (65.1)	14.8 (58.6)	11.9 (53.4)	11.7 (53.1)	13.5 (56.3)	15.8 (60.4)	18.0 (64.4)	21.0 (69.8)	23.1 (73.6)	18.4 (65.1)
Mean daily minimum °C (°F)	10.4 (50.7)	9.8 (49.6)	8.1 (46.6)	5.3 (41.5)	3.6 (38.5)	1.5 (34.7)	1.2 (34.2)	2.0 (35.6)	3.9 (39.0)	5.3 (41.5)	7.3 (45.1)	8.8 (47.8)	5.6 (42.1)
Record low °C (°F)	−0.4 (31.3)	0.2 (32.4)	−3.2 (26.2)	−5.6 (21.9)	−6.3 (20.7)	−7.8 (18.0)	−6.8 (19.8)	−6.7 (19.9)	−4.8 (23.4)	−3.6 (25.5)	−2.7 (27.1)	−0.4 (31.3)	−7.8 (18.0)
Average precipitation mm (inches)	29.6 (1.17)	27.7 (1.09)	31.3 (1.23)	31.5 (1.24)	38.5 (1.52)	43.4 (1.71)	51.6 (2.03)	61.2 (2.41)	63.4 (2.50)	55.3 (2.18)	38.8 (1.53)	36.2 (1.43)	511.1 (20.12)
Average precipitation days (≥ 0.2 mm)	7.7	7.6	9.0	9.9	13.0	14.5	16.7	17.0	15.6	14.7	11.9	10.8	148.4
Average afternoon relative humidity (%)	39	41	47	55	63	71	68	61	57	54	49	43	54
Average dew point °C (°F)	7.5 (45.5)	8.4 (47.1)	8.3 (46.9)	7.2 (45.0)	6.3 (43.3)	5.3 (41.5)	4.8 (40.6)	4.7 (40.5)	5.2 (41.4)	6.3 (43.3)	7.6 (45.7)	7.0 (44.6)	6.6 (43.8)
