= Percy Lewis (Australian cricketer) =

Australian cricketer (1864–1922)

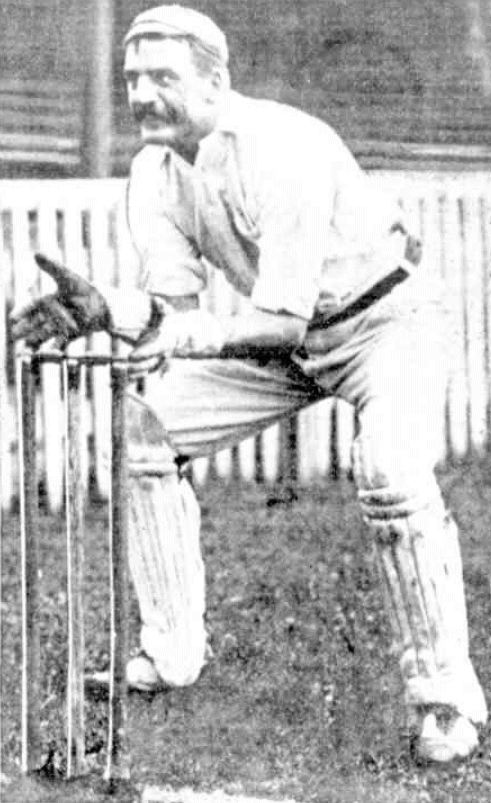

Personal information
- Full name: Percy Markham Lewis
- Born: 13 March 1864; Hamilton, Tasmania, Australia
- Died: 22 November 1922 (aged 58); St Kilda, Victoria, Australia
- Batting: Right-handed
- Role: Wicket-keeper

Domestic team information
- Years: Team
- 1883–1896: Victoria
- Source: ESPNcricinfo, 23 July 2015

Percy Markham Lewis (13 March 1864 – 24 November 1922) was an Australian cricketer. A wicket-keeper, he played 32 first-class cricket matches for Victoria between 1883 and 1896.
