= Millers Bluff =

- Town
- Coordinates: 41°58′13″S 147°05′53″E
- Country: Australia
- State: Tasmania
- Region: Central
- LGA: Central Highlands, Northern Midlands
- Location: 46 km (29 mi) S of Longford

Government
  - State electorate: Lyons
  - Federal division: Lyons

Population
  - Total: nil (2016 census)
- Postcode: 7030
Localities around Millers Bluff
Cressy	Cressy	Campbell Town
Arthurs Lake	Millers Bluff	Campbell Town
Arthurs Lake	Lake Sorell, Arthurs Lake	Lake Sorell, Campbell Town

Millers Bluff is a rural locality in the local government areas (LGA) of Central Highlands and Northern Midlands in the Central LGA region of Tasmania. The locality is about 46 kilometres (29 mi) south of the town of Longford. The 2016 census recorded a population of nil for the state suburb of Millers Bluff.

== History ==
Millers Bluff is a confirmed locality.

== Geography ==
The Lake River forms a small part of the eastern boundary. Almost all the boundaries are survey lines.

== Road infrastructure ==
Route C522 (Macquarie Road) passes to the north-east. From there, Lake River Road provides access to the locality.
