= Liawenee =

- Town
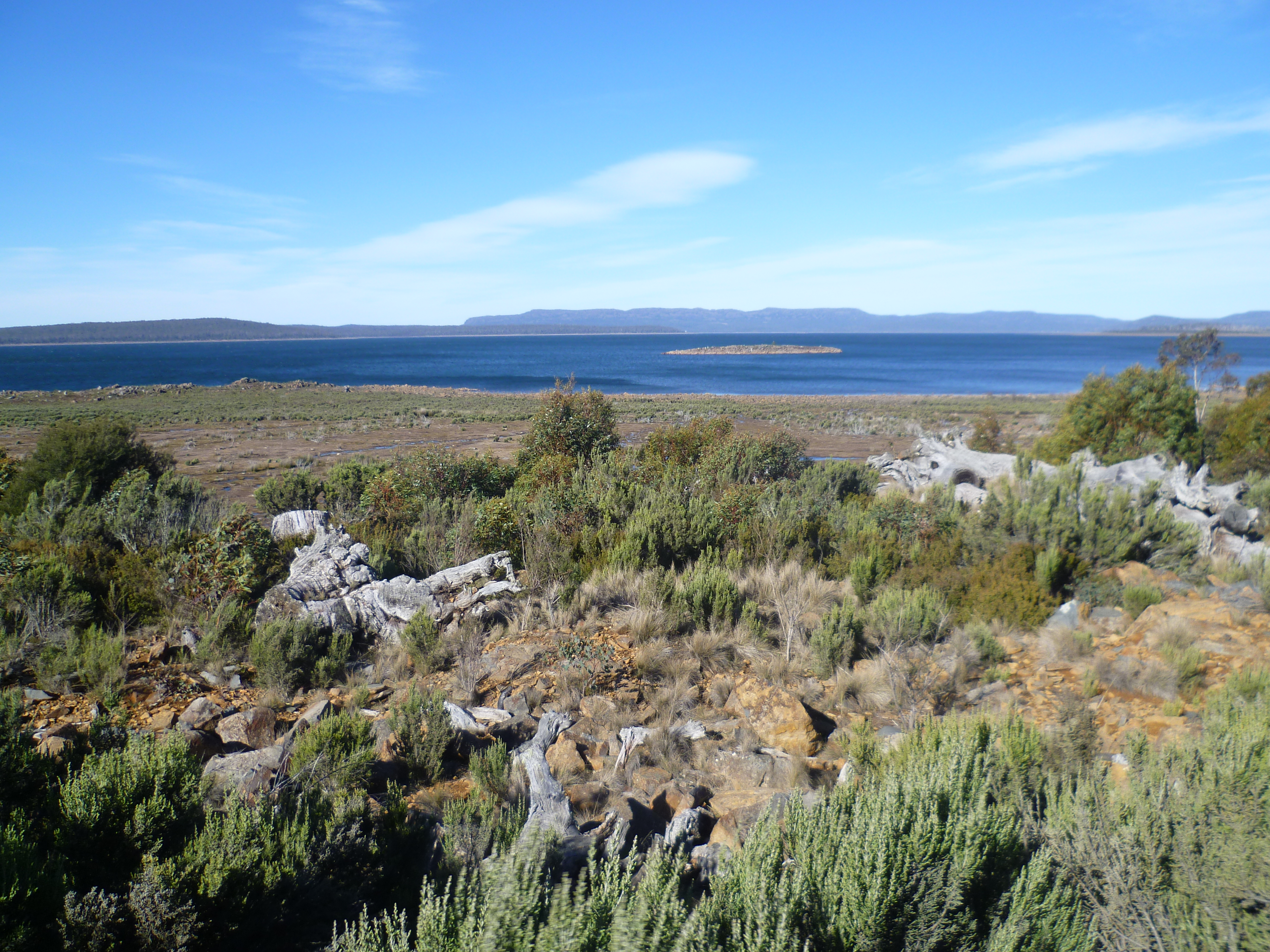

- Coordinates: 41°53′58.92″S 146°40′9.84″E
- Country: Australia
- State: Tasmania
- LGA: Central Highlands Council
- Location: 122 km (76 mi) NNW of Hobart
- Established: 11 June 1920

Government
  - State electorate: Lyons
  - Federal division: Lyons
- Elevation: 1,065 m (3,494 ft)

Population
  - Total: 2 (2011 census - Miena Dam incl. Liawenee)
- Postcode: 7030
- Mean max temp: 12.1 °C (53.8 °F)
- Mean min temp: 1.7 °C (35.1 °F)
- Annual rainfall: 925.6 mm (36.44 in)

Liawenee (/laɪ.əˈwiːni/) is a small town in Tasmania, Australia built near Great Lake and the River Ouse, and was established on 11 June 1920. The town is an ex-Hydro village and now a residence for Inland Fisheries Services (IFS) and a Tasmania Police station. It is known for its exceptional fishing at nearby Great Lake and hosts several trout fishing events.

Liawenee is the coldest permanently-inhabited place in Australia.

In January 2020, Liawenee’s population doubled to two, that being the police officer and an Inland Fisheries Service (IFS) officer now stationed permanently in the town.

== Origins ==
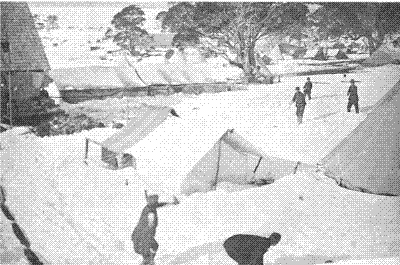
Photo taken in 1920 during the early days of encampment. Most people lived in tents, with only a few, more sturdy, wooden buildings.

Liawenee's name was derived from a Tasmanian Aboriginal word meaning "frigid". It was founded in June 1920 as a camp for the workers at the nearby hydroelectric undertaking as well as some other towns such as Miena. In its humble beginnings, the population consisted entirely of the workers at the hydroelectric plant and their families; the houses were wood and canvas. In this time, the camp boasted three cottages where married couples lived, and a so-called hospital that was only twice the size of a house, making it more of a first-aid clinic. The original layout included blacksmiths, bakeries and a chaff store which made up the requirements for a workforce making it a work camp rather than a village. During the Second World War the town became much larger, but settlers consisted mainly of men who were paid for their work yet could find no place to spend the money, nor a place to deliver mail.

The first Liawenee Post Office opened on 1 October 1919 and closed in 1922. The second opened on 2 February 1948 but closed in 1953. As of 2022, Liawenee consists of a police station and several small buildings.

== Geography ==
Liawenee is located along the Lake highway among the central Tasmanian mountains. The mountains surrounding Liawenee include Split Rock, Willow Run Hill, Headlam Hill and McDowall Hill, with the latter being the tallest. It is known as the twelfth-highest locality in Tasmania and the nearest ocean beach is 100 kilometres (62 miles) west-south-west from Liawenee's centre. The rough terrain suits bush-walking and mountain biking, except during winter, and the nearest populated area is Miena, about 13 km south. The section of the highway to Miena was sealed during 2015.

== Climate ==
Owing to its high-elevation location in the far south of Australia, Liawenee's climate features the rare cold-summer mediterranean climate (Köppen climate classification: Csc). February temperatures range between 5 °C (41 °F) and 18 °C (64 °F), which is colder than most mainland Australian winters south of about Geraldton in Western Australia. Even though summers are cool to mild, occasionally a northerly wind causes temperatures to climb into the mid- to high twenties but rarely into the thirties. The coldest day on record was on 23 July 2016, when the temperature did not rise above −2.1 °C (28.2 °F). A record low of −14.2 °C (6.4 °F) was recorded at Liawenee on the morning of 7 August 2020, which is also the lowest temperature ever recorded in Tasmania and the lowest daily minimum temperature recorded for Australia in 2020. Days below 10 °C (50 °F) have been recorded on multiple occasions in summer, with the coldest day in summer being 5.0 °C (41.0 °F), recorded on 3 December 2017. The town spends an annual average of only 0.7 days above 30 °C (86 °F) but in contrast spends 210.2 days below 2 °C (36 °F), with 142.4 below freezing.

There are about 136 cloudy days a year, which peaks in July at 16 days and drops to an average of 8 days in January. There are about 182 days of measurable precipitation each year. The annual mean 3pm humidity is 63%, from a low of 49% in January to a high of 78% in July. Snowfall is frequent and heavy; receiving 41.8 snowy days annually, of which can fall in any month.

Liawenee and surrounding Miena Dam experience annual mean maximum temperatures of 12.2 °C (54.0 °F) and 10.3 °C (50.5 °F), respectively, and are thus amongst the coldest permanently inhabited places in Australia; irrespective of Miena Dam, Liawenee is colder on this metric than notable mainland sites of a similar elevation such as Nimmitabel (15.6 °C (60.1 °F)) and Thredbo Village (13.8 °C (56.8 °F)) – a station of considerably greater elevation (1,380 m). However, Mount William in western Victoria at 1,150 m is just 12.7 °C (54.9 °F), with colder maxima than Liawenee between May and September. Within Tasmania, only the uninhabited summits of Mount Wellington (Kunanyi) and Mount Read record lower annual mean maximum temperatures (7.8 °C (46.0 °F) and 8.7 °C (47.7 °F), respectively) although other mountains of Tasmania that currently lack weather stations are very likely to also experience similar or colder conditions. Keoghs Pimple at a relatively low 831 m averages 11.4 °C (52.5 °F), and Butlers Gorge at 667 m averages 12.9 °C (55.2 °F).

Climate data for Liawenee (2001–2025); 1,057 m AMSL; 41.90° S, 146.67° E
Month	Jan	Feb	Mar	Apr	May	Jun	Jul	Aug	Sep	Oct	Nov	Dec	Year
Record high °C (°F)	32.3 (90.1)	31.2 (88.2)	28.6 (83.5)	23.0 (73.4)	20.1 (68.2)	14.5 (58.1)	12.9 (55.2)	17.1 (62.8)	20.5 (68.9)	25.3 (77.5)	27.4 (81.3)	31.2 (88.2)	32.3 (90.1)
Mean maximum °C (°F)	28.0 (82.4)	25.8 (78.4)	23.6 (74.5)	19.5 (67.1)	15.7 (60.3)	11.8 (53.2)	10.0 (50.0)	12.4 (54.3)	15.7 (60.3)	20.6 (69.1)	23.5 (74.3)	26.1 (79.0)	28.7 (83.7)
Mean daily maximum °C (°F)	19.1 (66.4)	18.2 (64.8)	16.0 (60.8)	12.3 (54.1)	9.0 (48.2)	6.5 (43.7)	5.7 (42.3)	6.7 (44.1)	9.1 (48.4)	11.9 (53.4)	15.0 (59.0)	16.6 (61.9)	12.2 (53.9)
Daily mean °C (°F)	12.4 (54.3)	11.7 (53.1)	10.0 (50.0)	7.1 (44.8)	4.6 (40.3)	2.8 (37.0)	2.1 (35.8)	2.8 (37.0)	4.4 (39.9)	6.4 (43.5)	8.9 (48.0)	10.3 (50.5)	7.0 (44.5)
Mean daily minimum °C (°F)	5.6 (42.1)	5.2 (41.4)	3.9 (39.0)	1.9 (35.4)	0.2 (32.4)	−1.0 (30.2)	−1.5 (29.3)	−1.2 (29.8)	−0.4 (31.3)	0.8 (33.4)	2.8 (37.0)	4.0 (39.2)	1.7 (35.0)
Mean minimum °C (°F)	−1.4 (29.5)	−1.8 (28.8)	−3.3 (26.1)	−5.3 (22.5)	−7.0 (19.4)	−8.1 (17.4)	−8.5 (16.7)	−7.9 (17.8)	−6.7 (19.9)	−5.6 (21.9)	−3.5 (25.7)	−2.2 (28.0)	−10.0 (14.0)
Record low °C (°F)	−4.0 (24.8)	−3.6 (25.5)	−6.9 (19.6)	−7.7 (18.1)	−10.5 (13.1)	−11.2 (11.8)	−13.5 (7.7)	−14.2 (6.4)	−10.7 (12.7)	−7.9 (17.8)	−6.8 (19.8)	−4.5 (23.9)	−14.2 (6.4)
Average precipitation mm (inches)	51.5 (2.03)	38.6 (1.52)	63.4 (2.50)	65.2 (2.57)	82.6 (3.25)	100.9 (3.97)	110.9 (4.37)	125.3 (4.93)	103.9 (4.09)	78.7 (3.10)	62.8 (2.47)	58.8 (2.31)	937.2 (36.90)
Average precipitation days (≥ 0.2 mm)	9.3	9.2	11.8	13.0	15.9	17.3	19.0	20.1	17.4	16.1	13.9	12.7	175.7
Average afternoon relative humidity (%)	49	51	55	65	69	77	78	74	68	61	53	54	63
Average dew point °C (°F)	4.9 (40.8)	5.5 (41.9)	4.7 (40.5)	3.6 (38.5)	1.8 (35.2)	1.1 (34.0)	0.5 (32.9)	0.4 (32.7)	0.7 (33.3)	1.5 (34.7)	2.9 (37.2)	4.0 (39.2)	2.6 (36.7)
Mean monthly sunshine hours	297.6	245.8	235.6	180.0	139.5	105.0	120.9	161.2	201.0	232.5	261.0	272.8	2,452.9
Source: Bureau of Meteorology
