= Central Highlands (Tasmania) =

Region in Australia

Coordinates: 42.2124°S 146.646°E

- Region
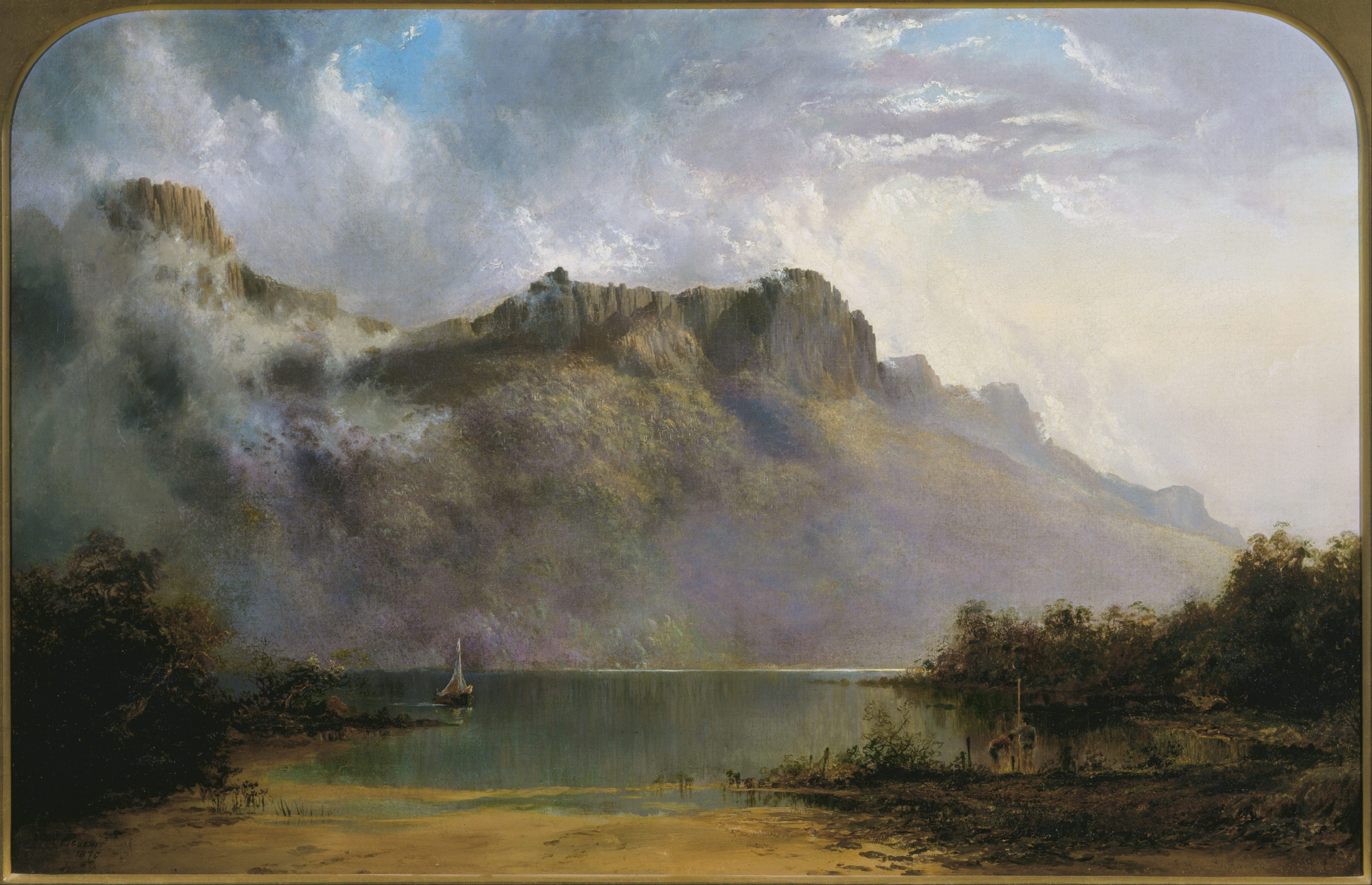
- Mount Olympus depicted by W. C. Piguenit in 1875.
- Country: Australia
- State: Tasmania
- LGA: Central Highlands

Government
  - State electorate: Lyons
  - Federal division: Lyons

Population
  - Total: 2,141
Regions around Central Highlands
| North West Tasmania | Northern Tasmania | North East Tasmania |
| West Coast Tasmania | Central Highlands | Midlands |
| South West Tasmania | Southern Tasmania | East Coast Tasmania |

The Central Highlands is a region in Tasmania, Australia where geographical and administrative boundaries closely coincide. It is also known as The Lake Country of Tasmania.

== Geographical region ==
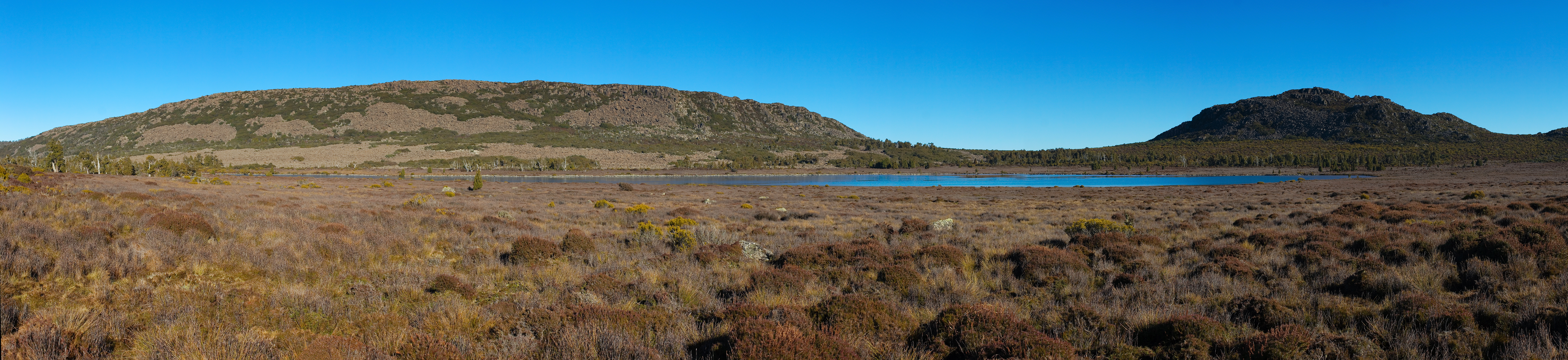
Pine Lake in the Central Highlands region of Tasmania

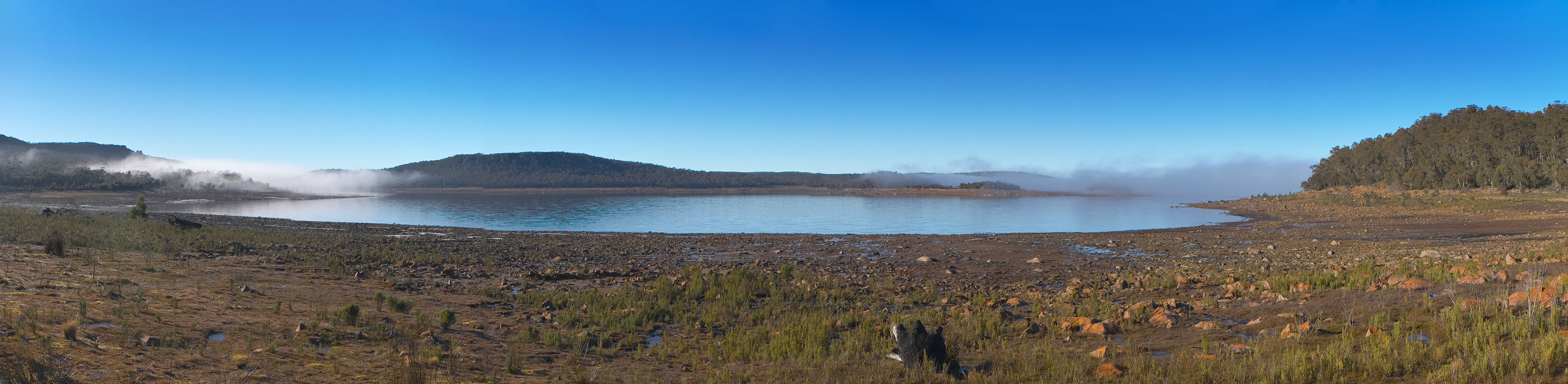
Great Lake

The mountains of Central Tasmania are mainly found in four different conservation reserves:

- Cradle Mountain-Lake St Clair National Park - in the western part
- Walls of Jerusalem National Park - in the central part
- Central Plateau Conservation Area in the eastern part

== Administrative region ==
The Central Highlands Council incorporates most of the highland region.

== Former Hydro communities ==
Early power developments by Hydro Tasmania in the Central Highlands included the communities of workers who were employed in construction. Significant numbers of the communities were migrants to Australia

The Tarraleah community was one established in 1934 which was a significant early community for the Upper Derwent Power Development. The part of Tarraleah known as Ticklebelly Flat - the area of the married quarters of the community - has become a part of Hydro history, being utilised in the most comprehensive history of the Hydro to date, Heather Fenton's book Ticklebelly Tales.

== Fishing ==
The Central Highlands of Tasmania are home to famous trout fishing lakes and boasts some of the best trout fly fishing found anywhere in the world. The location played host to the 2019 World Fly Fishing Championships. The Central Highlands are on the bucket list for many fly fisherman with popular locations including Great Lake, Arthurs Lake, Woods Lake and Penstock Lagoon. The fly fishing season in Tasmania generally opens from the first weekend in August until the last weekend in April‍.

== Tasmania heartland ==
The combined councils of the Central Highlands and the two Midlands councils - the southern and the northern have had for almost a decade a web based portal which combines the areas to a name of Tasmanian heartland. The Central Highlands Council has been organising the annual Bushfest which includes various outdoor activities such as fishing, camping, hunting and adventure sports. The event started in 2014 and witnesses a gathering of nearly 4000 people every year.

== Lakes ==
Many lakes are found in the Central Highlands - giving the region the tourist feature of the 'Lakes Region'; they include:

- Arthurs Lake
- Bradys Lake
- Bronte Lagoon
- Great Lake
- Lagoon of Islands
- Lake Augusta
- Lake Binney
- Lake Crescent
- Lake Echo
- Lake King William
- Lake Sorell
- Little Pine Lagoon
- Penstock Lagoon

== Early European exploration ==
In December 1817, colonial official John Beamont led one of the earliest documented official expeditions into the Central Highlands before reaching the Great Lake. Beamont's journal, later published in Historical Records of Australia, contains one of the earliest official descriptions of the Central Highlands, including observations of the Great Lake, Huon pine and the western lake country. His evidence before Commissioner John Thomas Bigge in 1820 further documented the geography and natural features of the region for the colonial administration.

== See also ==
- Midlands (Tasmania)
