= Central Plateau Conservation Area =

- IUCN category VI (protected area with sustainable use of natural resources)
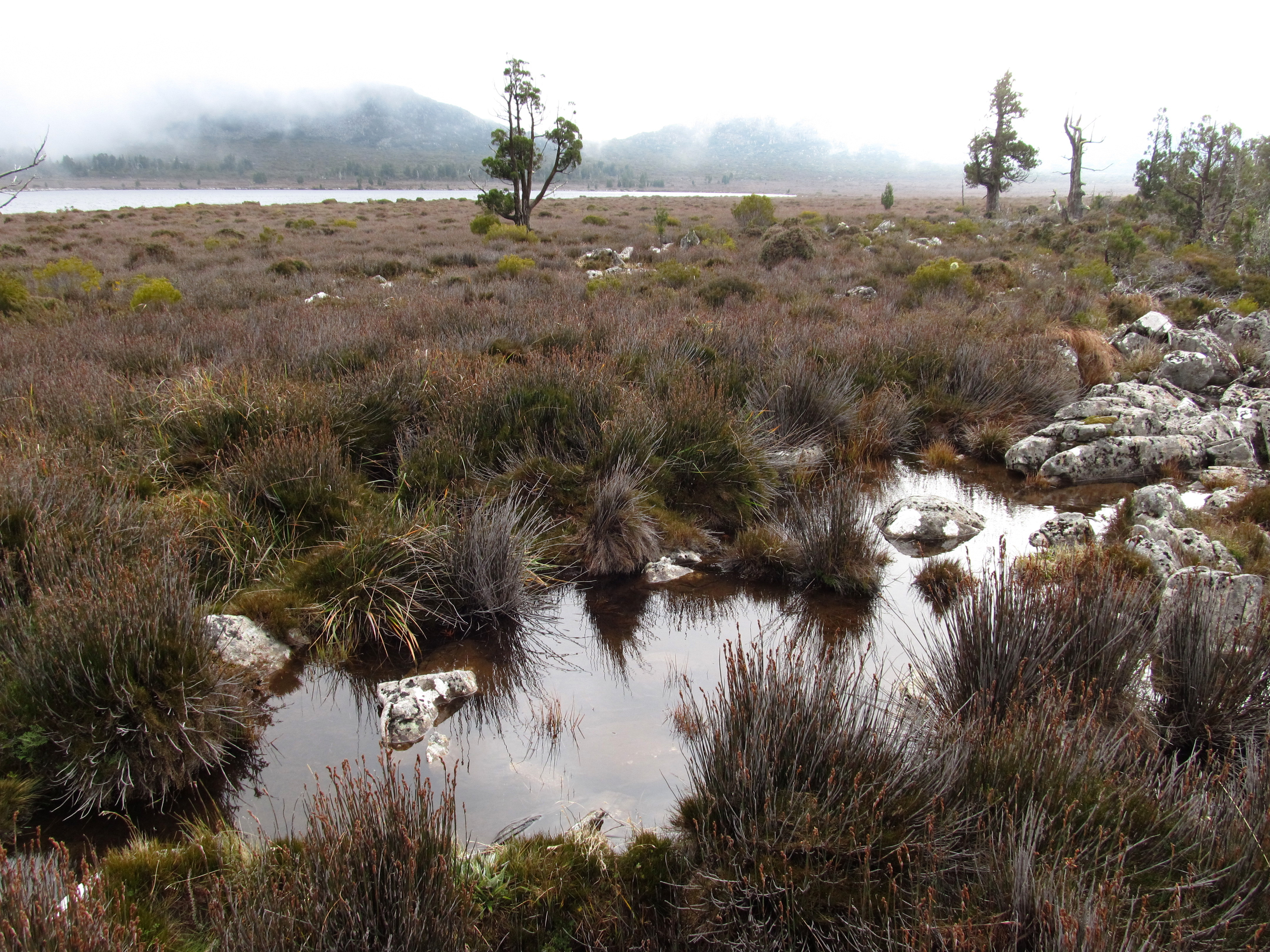
- Pine Lagoon, Central Pateau Conservation Area, in June 2013

- Location within Tasmania
- Location: Tasmania
- Coordinates: 41°51′1″S 146°33′28″E
- Area: 908.7 km^{2} (350.9 sq mi)
- Established: 1978
- Governing body: Tasmania Parks and Wildlife Service
- Website: https://parks.tas.gov.au/explore-our-parks/central-plateau-conservation-area

Central Plateau Conservation Area is an animal and plant conservation area in Tasmania, Australia. It is adjacent to the Walls of Jerusalem National Park.

The Central Plateau of Tasmania is the largest area of high ground in Tasmania. It is bound to the north east by the Great Western Tiers, many hydro electric schemes emanating from rivers that flow to the south - and to the west by Cradle Mountain-Lake St Clair National Park.

Central Plateau is a large rural locality in the local government areas of Central Highlands and Meander Valley in the Central and Launceston regions of Tasmania. Its central point, to the west of Great Lake, is about 117 kilometres (73 mi) north-west of the town of Hamilton. The 2016 census recorded a population of nil for the state suburb of Central Plateau.

Central Plateau is a confirmed suburb/locality.

== Location ==
Central Plateau surrounds the locality of Cramps Bay, on the eastern shore of Great Lake. The western part of the locality contains most of the Central Plateau Conservation Area, while the eastern part contains Great Lake. The localities of Breona, Doctors Point, Brandum, Reynolds Neck, Liawenee and Miena occupy a corridor between the western part and Great Lake.

The conservation area extends beyond the boundaries of the locality, taking in parts of the localities of Blackwood Creek, Brandum, Breona, Bronte Park, Caveside, Derwent Bridge, Doctors Point, Jackeys Marsh, Lake St Clair, Liawenee, Liffey, Little Pine Lagoon, Mayberry, Meander, Mersey Forest, Miena, Mole Creek, Reynolds Neck, Walls of Jerusalem, and Western Creek.

== Road infrastructure ==
The A5 route (Highland Lakes Road) enters from the north and runs through to the south. Route B51 (Poatina Road) runs through from north-east to south-east.

== See also ==
- Protected areas of Tasmania
