= Arthurs Lake Dam =

Dam, reservoir, and power station in Tasmania, Australia

- Location of the dam in Tasmania
- Interactive map of Arthurs Lake Dam
- Country: Australia
- Location: Central Highlands Tasmania
- Coordinates: 42°01′54″S 146°55′16″E
- Purpose: Power
- Status: Operational
- Opening date: 1965
- Owner: Hydro Tasmania

Dam and spillways
- Type of dam: Rock-fill dam
- Impounds: Lake River
- Height: 17 m (56 ft)
- Length: 482 m (1,581 ft)
- Dam volume: 113×10^{3} m^{3} (4.0×10^{6} cu ft)
- Spillways: 1
- Spillway type: Controlled and uncontrolled
- Spillway capacity: 43 m^{3}/s (1,500 cu ft/s)

Reservoir
- Creates: Arthurs Lake
- Total capacity: 511,390 ML (414,590 acre⋅ft)
- Catchment area: 259 km^{2} (100 sq mi)
- Surface area: 645.9 ha (1,596 acres)
- Normal elevation: 947 m (3,107 ft) AHD

Tods Corner Power Station
- Coordinates: 41°57′00″S 146°46′48″E
- Operator: Hydro Tasmania
- Commission date: 1 January 1966
- Type: Pumped-storage
- Hydraulic head: 41 m (135 ft)
- Turbines: 1 x 1.7 MW (2,300 hp) (Maier Francis-type)
- Installed capacity: 1.7 MW (2,300 hp)
- Annual generation: 8 GWh (29 TJ)
- Website hydro.com.au

The Arthurs Lake Dam is a rock-filled embankment dam across the Lake River, located between the small settlements of Wilburville and Morass Bay, in the Central Highlands region of Tasmania, Australia. Completed in 1965, the resultant reservoir, Arthurs Lake, (Note: Sometimes spelled as Arthur's Lake.) was established for the purpose of generating hydro-electric power via the Tods Corner Power Station, the only pumped-storage hydroelectric power stations located in Tasmania. The dam and power station are part of the Great Lake and South Esk catchment.

The dam, reservoir and power station are owned and operated by Hydro Tasmania.

== Dam and reservoir overview ==
=== Dam ===
The rock-filled dam wall is 17 metres (56 ft) high and 482 metres (1,581 ft) long. When full, Lake Burbury has capacity of 511,390 megalitres (414,590 acre⋅ft) and covers 6,459 hectares (15,960 acres), drawn from a catchment area of 259 square kilometres (100 sq mi). The single controlled and uncontrolled spillway is capable of discharging 43 cubic metres per second (1,500 cu ft/s).

=== Reservoir ===
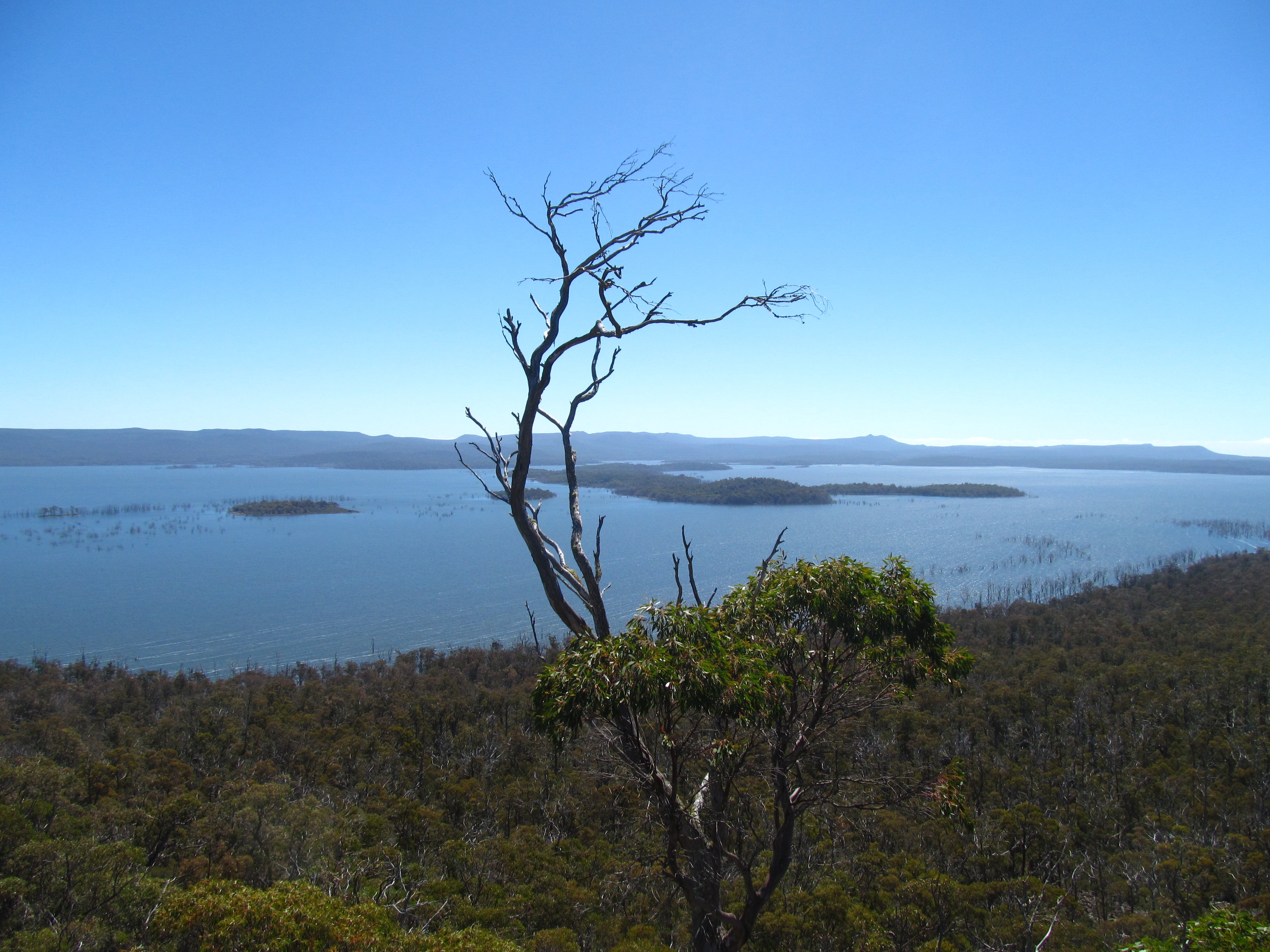
The lake in 2017

Arthurs Lake is located in the Central Highlands, north of Lyell Highway, east of Great Lake. Europeans discovered the lake in 1825. John Helder Wedge, an explorer and surveyor in Colonial Van Dieman's Land, was sent to find the source of the Lake River, which he found at Arthurs Lake. Arthurs Lake was created in the 1920s by flooding the upper Lake River, two existing natural lakes, Blue Lake and Sand Lake, and an area of marshs. The lake was named in honour of General Sir Arthur Cotton, a British army officer and irrigation engineer.

Water is pumped from Arthurs Lake to Great Lake, which feeds the Poatina Power Station. Some of the pumping energy is recovered by the Tods Corner Power Station. In 2017, Irrigation Tasmania installed a floating safety barrier to prevent fishing boats accessing the hydro intake pipe in this very popular fishing lake.

The reservoir is stocked with brown trout and is a popular fly fishing location for anglers visiting Tasmania.

== Hydroelectric power station ==
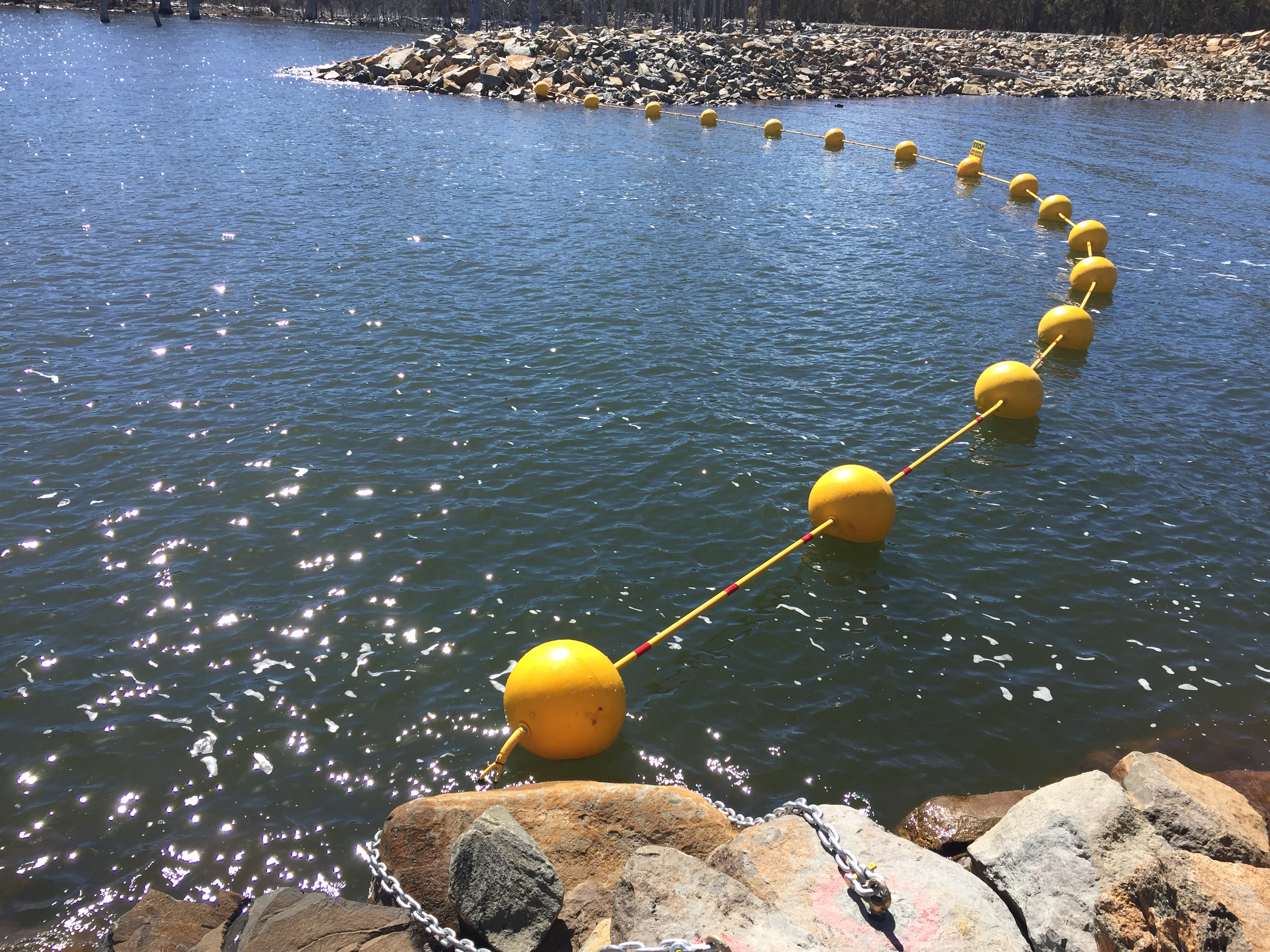
Preventing fishing boat access to the Hydro intake pipe area

Located in the Great Lake and South Esk catchment area, the Tods Corner Power Station was developed to recover the available energy from the water out of the Arthurs Lake Pumping Station. In order to increase the size of the reservoir at the Great Lake, and increase the water available to the Waddamana Power Stations, (Note: Waddamana A was decommissioned in 1965; and Waddamana B was decommissioned in 1995.) Arthurs Lake was created in the 1920s with the damming of several creeks and water was pumped from it into the Great Lake as required by the station. With the construction of the much larger Poatina Power Station in 1966 to replace Waddamana, Tods Corner was added to recover some of the energy used by the pump systems. The power station is located on the south-eastern shore of Great Lake, below the dam wall, and is supplied with water via a 105-metre-long (344 ft) penstock connected to an open flume which carries the discharge from Arthurs Lake Pumping Station.

Commissioned in 1966 by the Hydro Electric Corporation, the station has a single Maier Francis-type turbine with capacity of 1.7 megawatts (2,300 hp) coupled to a Siemens induction generator. The station output, estimated at 8 gigawatt-hours (29 TJ) annually, is fed to TasNetworks' transmission grid at its output voltage of 6.6 kV via a circuit breaker located in the exterior switchyard.

== See also ==
- List of power stations in Tasmania
- List of reservoirs and dams in Tasmania
- List of lakes in Tasmania
