= Great Lake (Tasmania) =

Lake and reservoir in Tasmania, Australia

yingina / Great Lake
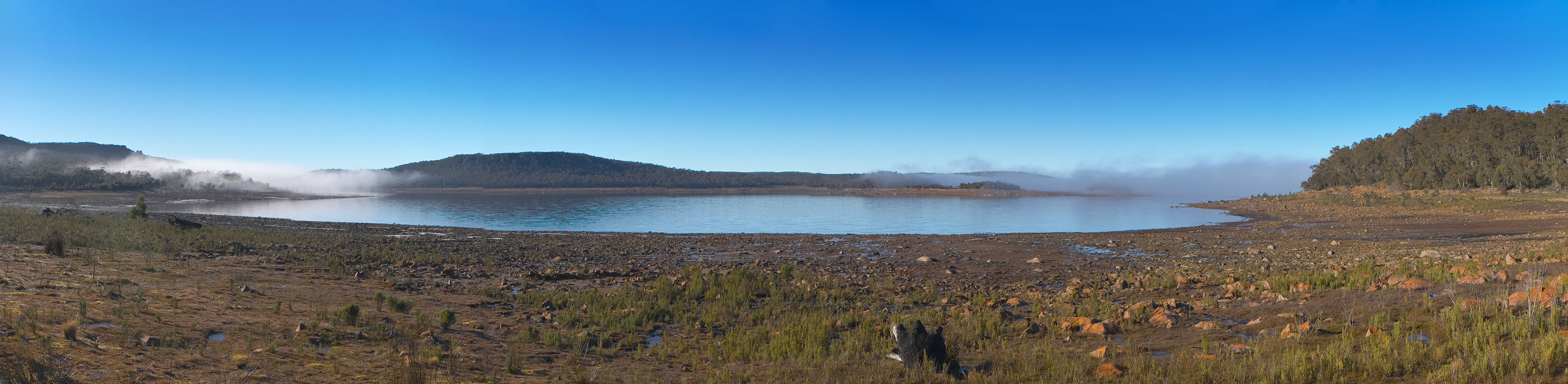
- The northern end of the Great Lake

- Location of the lake in Tasmania
- Map showing the lake in Tasmania
- Location: Central Highlands, Tasmania
- Coordinates: 41°52′S 146°45′E
- Type: Freshwater lake; reservoir
- Primary inflows: Pine Rivulet; Breton Rivulet
- Primary outflows: Shannon River
- Catchment area: 399 km^{2} (154 sq mi)
- Basin countries: Australia
- Built: 1916, 1922, and 1967
- Max. length: 24.6 km (15.3 mi)
- Max. width: 12 km (7.5 mi)
- Surface area: 176 km^{2} (68 sq mi)
- Surface elevation: 1,030 m (3,380 ft) AHD
- Frozen: During some winters
- Islands: Reynolds; Howells Neck; Pine; Helen; Kangaroo; and Maclanachans Point
- Settlements: Miena, Breona, Liawenee

The Great Lake, officially yingina / Great Lake, is a natural freshwater lake in the Central Highlands region of Tasmania, Australia.

Fed by two small rivulets and drained by the Shannon River, the lake has been significantly enlarged through the impoundments created in 1916 by the Miena Dam No. 1, in 1922 by the Miena Dam No. 2, and in 1967 by the Miena Rockfill Dam. The lake is predominantly used as a man-made reservoir for the generation of hydroelectricity, initially at the Waddamana Power Stations and, since 1967, at the Poatina, Tods Corner, and Trevallyn power stations. Additionally, the Great Lake also supports irrigation of 35 square kilometres (14 sq mi) of adjacent farmland.

== Location and features ==
Fed by the Pine Rivulet and Breton Rivulet, the original natural freshwater lake, much smaller in size than its current 176-square-kilometre (68 sq mi) surface area, was expanded as a result of the 1922 construction of Miena Dam No. 2 at its southern outflow into the Shannon River. This dam is listed on the Tasmanian Heritage Register and is considered to be of high heritage value by Engineers Australia.

The Miena Dam No. 2 created the once-famous Shannon Rise, in the 500-metre (1,600 ft) section of the Shannon River between the dam and Shannon Lagoon. The hatching of thousands of caddis moths in early summer, attracted large numbers of trout and anglers.

In 1967, a sloping-core rock-fill dam, the Miena Rockfill Dam, was built just downstream of Miena Dam No. 2 to increase the maximum-capacity level, destroying the Shannon Rise. It was raised a further six metres (twenty feet) in 1982, causing Miena Dam No. 2 to be periodically submerged.

An enhancement of the irrigation scheme, expected to deliver 25 gigalitres (20,000 acre⋅ft), commenced in 2024 and was expected to be completed in late 2026.

== Recreation ==
At 1,030 metres (3,380 ft) AHD, the lake's uses include the generation of hydroelectricity, fishing, and tourism.

After Lake Pedder and Lake Gordon, the Great Lake is the state's third largest freshwater lake. It is known for its fantastic fly fishing opportunities, particularly after a wet winter or spring. When water levels are high, trout can be found 'tailing' in the shallow, flooded margins of the lake which provides excellent sight fly fishing. The lake is well known for its brown and rainbow trout.

The nearby towns of Liawenee and Miena are popular holiday shack destinations for local tourists, despite the area's reputation as being one of the coldest places in the generally mild-weathered state. During the winter months, when the weather is hardly conducive to camping, the population of these two small towns drops to two or three hundred. Parts of the lake surface have frozen during July in some years.

The Lake Highway or Highland Lakes Road runs along the west side of the lake and is sometimes snowed under in winter.

== See also ==
- List of lakes in Australia § Tasmania
- List of reservoirs and dams in Australia § Tasmania
