= Miena, Tasmania =

Miena Tasmania
- Coordinates: 41°59′S 146°44′E
- Population: 127 (SAL 2021)
- Postcode(s): 7030
- Elevation: 1,052 m (3,451 ft)
- Location: 120 km (75 mi) NW of Hobart; 80 km (50 mi) SW of Launceston; 60 km (37 mi) S of Deloraine; 55 km (34 mi) NW of Bothwell
- LGA(s): Central Highlands Council
- State electorate(s): Lyons
- Federal division(s): Lyons
| Mean max temp | Mean min temp | Annual rainfall |
| 10.3 °C; 51 °F | 1.6 °C; 35 °F | 830.9 mm 32.7 in |

Miena is a small town at the southern end of the Great Lake in the Central Highlands of Tasmania, Australia. At the 2021 census, Miena and the surrounding area had a population of 127.

Accommodation around Miena includes lakeside hotels, self-contained lodges and numerous shacks. Miena is well known for lake fishing and its hydro-electric dam.

== History ==
Miena, Liawenee and Waddamana are place names indicating a strong Aboriginal presence over thousands of years, including the Luggermairrenerpairer clan. Miena, pronounced "my-ee-na", translates to "lagoon-like". These names were applied to the area by Hydro Tasmania.

The settler and first sheriff of Tasmania, John Beaumont, explored the Central Highlands plateau during December 1817. The Beaumont Memorial and grave is a short walk from the Dam.

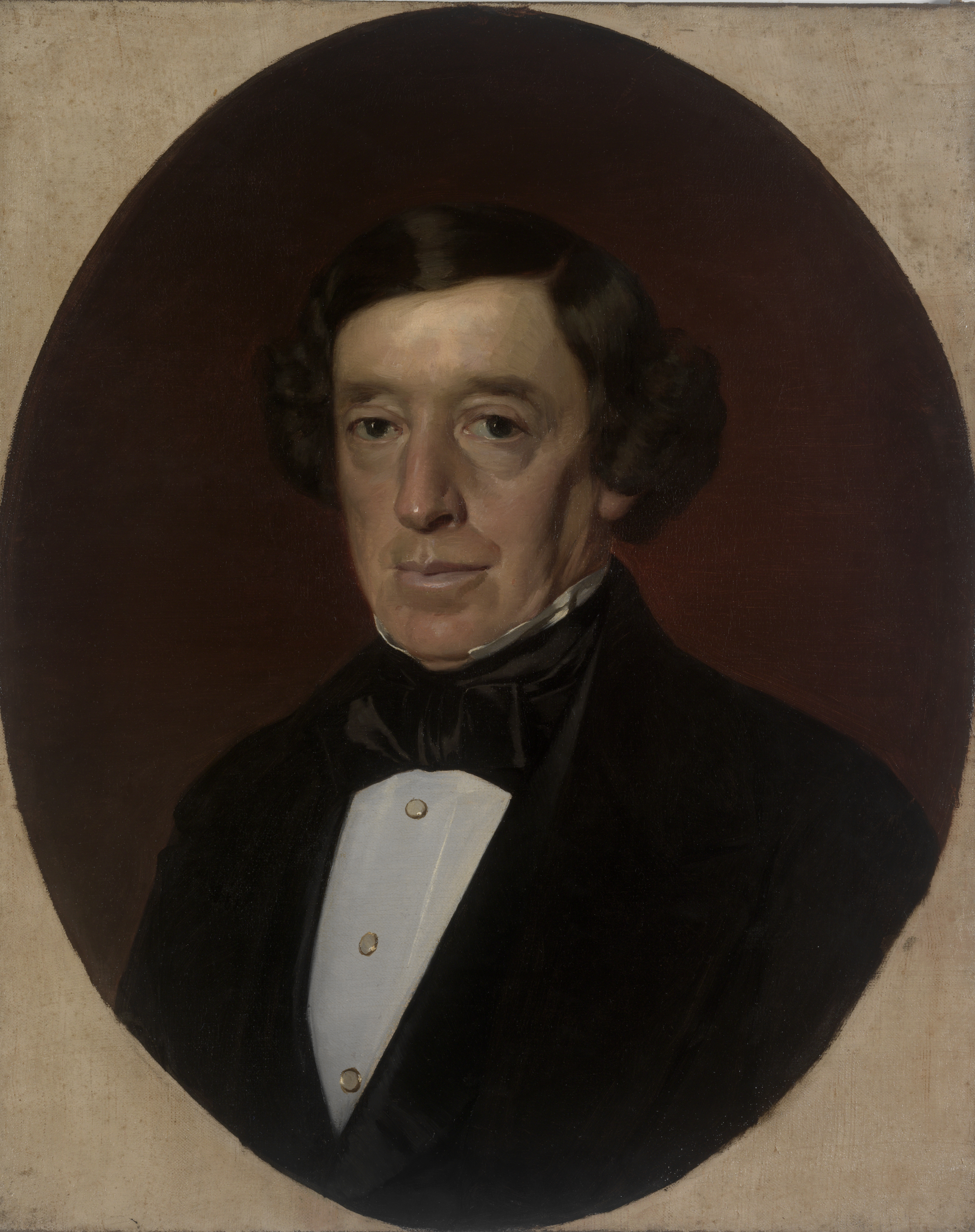
George Augustus Robinson

In 1831 George Augustus Robinson was searching the Central Highlands for Aboriginal people in his role as "conciliator". He camped at the site of the future dam at Miena, where he reported "large numbers of swan, a number of light-coloured kangaroo and signs of platypus".

Murderers Hill, elevation 1055 metres, opposite the Great Lake Hotel, takes its name from the murder there of a shepherd and convict hut keeper by bushrangers in 1840.

In the period of the gold rush and the Tasmanian depression of the 1860s, Tasmania's high country was occupied only by Aborigines, shepherds and the occasional bushranger. Early colonists used the alpine Central Highlands as summer pastures employing shepherds and hut keepers. Hunters were attracted to the Central Plateau, and from the 1890s to the 1960s trapping for pelts was a significant activity.

The introduction of trout to Tasmanian lakes brought hundreds of visitors to the highlands in the 1890s. Great Lake Post Office opened on 1 August 1897. It was later renamed Miena in 1920 and closed in 1942. It re-opened in 1957 as a telephone office which was closed once more in 1969. The community postal agency is now located in the Central Highland Lodge. An amateur radio repeater is installed on Barren Tier nearby.

Miena Dam has three dam walls, although two are often submerged. The Tasmanian Hydro Electric Power and Metallurgical Co. built a small dam at the outlet from the Great Lake in 1911. Construction of canals and pipelines conveyed the water to Waddamana where it was intended to generate power for the treatment of complex ores. In 1914 the Government acquired the company, and by May 1916 two turbo-alternators had been installed at Waddamana Power Station. In 1919-1922 a multi-arch dam was constructed at Miena to increase the Great Lake storage and the power station was expanded to supply more power. In 1967 a sloping core rock-fill dam was built downstream; this was raised again in 1982.

Waddamana Power Station is now a museum and heritage site, with restored machinery and displays about the pioneering days of power development in the highlands.

Many of the local lakes and lagoons, including Penstock lagoon and the Great Lake, were part of the World Fly Fishing Championships of 1988 and 2012. Little Pine Lagoon has been described as Tasmania's premier fly fishing water location. The 2019 WFFC was again conducted in the area. The geographic centre of Tasmania is located on the western shore of the lagoon.

The section of the Highland Lakes Road to nearby Liawenee was sealed during 2015. The upper section to the Breona locality was completed in April 2019.

The area is subject to summer bushfires. The Miena shack community was evacuated in January 2019, as fires crossed Barren Tier and the Great Pine Tier. One house near Miena was destroyed. Warnings were issued for nearby Tods Corner, Penstock Lagoon, Liawenee and Shannon.

== Climate ==
Miena is the coldest locality in Australia with its very cool summers and cold, snowy winters. Miena has an altitude-influenced Subpolar oceanic climate (Köppen: Cfc), bordering on a Tundra climate (ET)

Snowfall is both frequent and heavy; receiving 51.5 snowy days annually, which can fall in any month. This can cause occasional road closures in the area, even in summer.

Climate data for Miena Dam (1915–1943, rainfall 1889–2022); 1,052 m AMSL; 41.98° S, 146.72° E
| Month | Jan | Feb | Mar | Apr | May | Jun | Jul | Aug | Sep | Oct | Nov | Dec | Year |
|---|---|---|---|---|---|---|---|---|---|---|---|---|---|
| Mean daily maximum °C (°F) | 15.4 (59.7) | 16.3 (61.3) | 14.0 (57.2) | 10.8 (51.4) | 8.0 (46.4) | 5.4 (41.7) | 4.3 (39.7) | 5.3 (41.5) | 7.5 (45.5) | 9.7 (49.5) | 12.2 (54.0) | 14.8 (58.6) | 10.3 (50.5) |
| Mean daily minimum °C (°F) | 4.8 (40.6) | 5.5 (41.9) | 3.7 (38.7) | 2.1 (35.8) | 0.4 (32.7) | −1.1 (30.0) | −1.8 (28.8) | −1.6 (29.1) | −0.2 (31.6) | 1.1 (34.0) | 2.6 (36.7) | 4.2 (39.6) | 1.6 (35.0) |
| Average precipitation mm (inches) | 51.8 (2.04) | 47.2 (1.86) | 55.3 (2.18) | 65.7 (2.59) | 73.7 (2.90) | 76.6 (3.02) | 86.4 (3.40) | 89.3 (3.52) | 80.2 (3.16) | 77.8 (3.06) | 63.5 (2.50) | 64.1 (2.52) | 839.2 (33.04) |
| Average precipitation days (≥ 0.2 mm) | 11.3 | 9.8 | 12.7 | 15.6 | 18.1 | 18.9 | 21.1 | 20.5 | 18.9 | 17.7 | 15.0 | 13.2 | 192.8 |
| Average afternoon relative humidity (%) | 67 | 67 | 68 | 73 | 78 | 81 | 81 | 78 | 76 | 73 | 69 | 67 | 73 |
Source: Australian Bureau of Meteorology
