= Hamilton, Tasmania =

Hamilton Tasmania
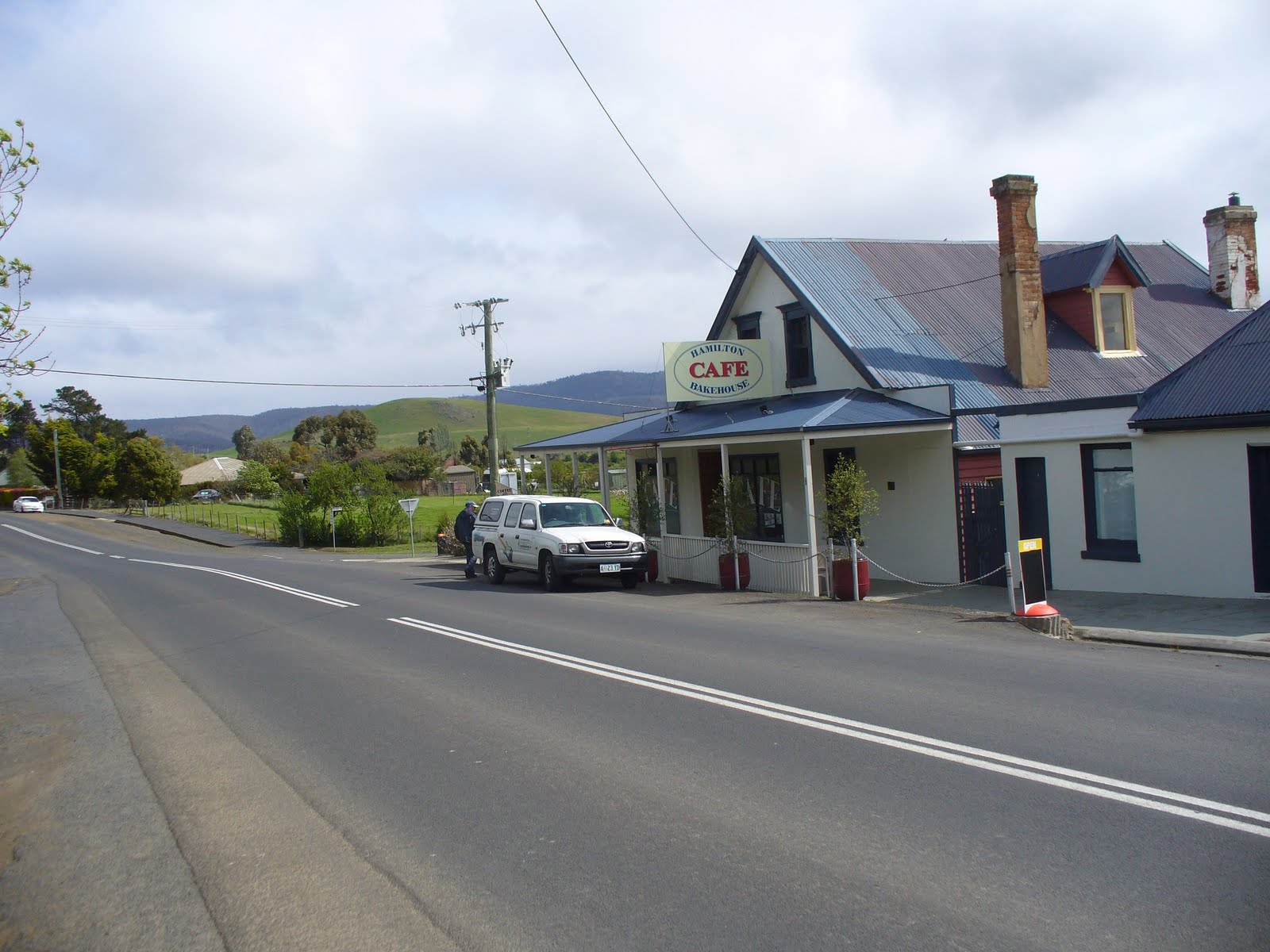

- Coordinates: 42.556°S 146.834°E
- Population: 241 (2021 census)
- Postcode(s): 7140
- Location: 73 km (45 mi) NW of Hobart; 37 km (23 mi) NW of New Norfolk; 20 km (12 mi) SE of Ouse
- LGA(s): Central Highlands Council
- Region: Central
- State electorate(s): Lyons
- Federal division(s): Lyons
Mean max temp	Mean min temp	Annual rainfall
18.4 °C; 65 °F	5.6 °C; 42 °F	511.1 mm 20.1 in
Localities around Hamilton:
Ouse	Hollow Tree	Hollow Tree
Ouse	Hamilton	Pelham
Meadowbank, Ellendale	Gretna	Gretna

Hamilton is a rural locality in the local government area (LGA) of Central Highlands in the Central LGA region of Tasmania. The locality is about 73 kilometres (45 mi) north-west of the city of Hobart. The 2016 census recorded a population of 241 for the suburb of Hamilton.

== History ==
Hamilton was gazetted as a locality in 1959.

Governor Lachlan Macquarie named the locality "Sorell Plains", and it became locally known as "Macquarie" and "Lower Clyde".

Governor George Arthur finalised a name for the locality and this was announced in 1826. Hamilton was named after William Henry Hamilton, a wealthy free settler who had arrived in Van Diemen's Land in April 1824.

Hamilton Post Office opened on 1 June 1832.

Hamilton was once a bustling frontier town that contained many inns and several working breweries.

It contains a few small shops and buildings, such as the court house, many of them dating back to convict times.

== Notable people ==
Cricketer Percy Lewis was born here in 1864. Tasmanian artist Edith Lilla Holmes was born here in 1893.

== Road infrastructure ==
Route A10 (Lyell Highway) runs through from south-east to west. Route B110 (Hollow Tree Road) starts at an intersection with A10 and runs north-east until it exits. Route C182 (Thousand Acre Lane) starts at an intersection with A10 and runs east until it exits.

== Geography ==
The River Derwent (Meadowbank Lake) forms the south-western boundary. The Clyde River flows through from north to south after forming a small part of the northern boundary.

=== Climate ===
Hamilton has an oceanic climate (Köppen: Cfb), with mild, dry summers and cool, somewhat damp winters. Average maxima vary from 25.6 °C (78.1 °F) in January to 11.7 °C (53.1 °F) in July while average minima fluctuate between 10.4 °C (50.7 °F) in January and 1.2 °C (34.2 °F) in July. Due to its inland location and being downwind of the Central Highlands, midsummer freezes have been recorded, while foehn winds occur (primarily in summer). Mean annual precipitation is quite low, 511.1 mm (20.12 in) spread on 148.4 days, and is concentrated in winter. Snow is not uncommon.

Extreme temperatures have ranged from −7.8 °C (18.0 °F) on 24 June 2013 to 40.7 °C (105.3 °F) on 11 January 2010. Climate data are sourced from Ouse (Fire Station), a town 20 km (12 mi) southeast of Hamilton.

Climate data for Ouse Fire Station (42º28'48"S, 146º42'36"E, 90 m AMSL) (1998–2024)
Month	Jan	Feb	Mar	Apr	May	Jun	Jul	Aug	Sep	Oct	Nov	Dec	Year
Record high °C (°F)	40.7 (105.3)	39.0 (102.2)	37.9 (100.2)	31.4 (88.5)	26.0 (78.8)	19.3 (66.7)	19.6 (67.3)	22.5 (72.5)	27.1 (80.8)	32.0 (89.6)	35.0 (95.0)	40.0 (104.0)	40.7 (105.3)
Mean daily maximum °C (°F)	25.6 (78.1)	24.9 (76.8)	22.3 (72.1)	18.4 (65.1)	14.8 (58.6)	11.9 (53.4)	11.7 (53.1)	13.5 (56.3)	15.8 (60.4)	18.0 (64.4)	21.0 (69.8)	23.1 (73.6)	18.4 (65.1)
Mean daily minimum °C (°F)	10.4 (50.7)	9.8 (49.6)	8.1 (46.6)	5.3 (41.5)	3.6 (38.5)	1.5 (34.7)	1.2 (34.2)	2.0 (35.6)	3.9 (39.0)	5.3 (41.5)	7.3 (45.1)	8.8 (47.8)	5.6 (42.1)
Record low °C (°F)	−0.4 (31.3)	0.2 (32.4)	−3.2 (26.2)	−5.6 (21.9)	−6.3 (20.7)	−7.8 (18.0)	−6.8 (19.8)	−6.7 (19.9)	−4.8 (23.4)	−3.6 (25.5)	−2.7 (27.1)	−0.4 (31.3)	−7.8 (18.0)
Average precipitation mm (inches)	29.6 (1.17)	27.7 (1.09)	31.3 (1.23)	31.5 (1.24)	38.5 (1.52)	43.4 (1.71)	51.6 (2.03)	61.2 (2.41)	63.4 (2.50)	55.3 (2.18)	38.8 (1.53)	36.2 (1.43)	511.1 (20.12)
Average precipitation days (≥ 0.2 mm)	7.7	7.6	9.0	9.9	13.0	14.5	16.7	17.0	15.6	14.7	11.9	10.8	148.4
Average afternoon relative humidity (%)	39	41	47	55	63	71	68	61	57	54	49	43	54
Average dew point °C (°F)	7.5 (45.5)	8.4 (47.1)	8.3 (46.9)	7.2 (45.0)	6.3 (43.3)	5.3 (41.5)	4.8 (40.6)	4.7 (40.5)	5.2 (41.4)	6.3 (43.3)	7.6 (45.7)	7.0 (44.6)	6.6 (43.8)
Source: Bureau of Meteorology
