= Otago (disambiguation) =

Otago is a region of New Zealand in the South Island.

Otago may also refer to:

== Places ==
=== New Zealand ===
- Otago (New Zealand electorate), from 1978 to 2008
- Otago Harbour, Dunedin
- Otago Peninsula, the peninsula around Otago Harbour
- Otago Province, a province from 1853 to 1876

=== Elsewhere ===
- Otago, Tasmania, a suburb of Hobart
- Otago Bay, Tasmania, a bay in Tasmania
- Ōtagō Station, a train station in Chikusei, Ibaraki Prefecture, Japan

== Ships ==
- HMNZS Otago, two ships of the Royal New Zealand Navy
- Otago (barque), a barque skippered by Joseph Conrad

== See also ==
- University of Otago, Dunedin
