= Hibbertia basaltica =

Basalt guinea flower

Conservation status
- Endangered (EPBC Act)

Scientific classification
- Kingdom: Plantae
- Clade: Tracheophytes
- Clade: Angiosperms
- Clade: Eudicots
- Order: Dilleniales
- Family: Dilleniaceae
- Genus: Hibbertia
- Species: H. basaltica

Binomial name
- Hibbertia basaltica A.M.Buchanan & Schah.

Species of flowering plant

Hibbertia basaltica, commonly known as basalt guinea flower, is a species of flowering plant in the family Dilleniaceae and is endemic to Tasmania. It is a prostrate or low-lying subshrub with linear to oblong leaves and yellow flowers with five or six stamens arranged in a two groups on either side of the two carpels.

== Description ==
Hibbertia basaltica is a prostrate or low-lying subshrub with stems up to 40 cm (16 in) long. The leaves are linear to oblong, 3–6 mm (0.12–0.24 in) long and 1–1.6 mm (0.039–0.063 in) wide on a short petiole and with the edges rolled under. The flowers are arranged singly on the ends of short side-branches on a peduncle up to 6–14 mm (0.24–0.55 in) long with a narrow elliptic bract 1.5–3 mm (0.059–0.118 in) long. The five sepals are joined at the base, the outer two 4.5–5 mm (0.18–0.20 in) long and the inner lobes slightly shorter. The five petals are yellow and heart-shaped with the narrower end towards the base, 7.5–10 mm (0.30–0.39 in) long and are shed early. There are four or five stamens in a group on one side of the two carpels and a single erect stamen on the other side. Flowering mainly occurs from late September to late November.

== Taxonomy ==
Hibbertia basaltica was first described in 2006 by Alex M. Buchanan and Richard B. Schahinger in the journal Muelleria collected in an old quarry near Pontville in 2004. The specific epithet (basaltica) refers to the basalt on which this species usually grows.

== Distribution and habitat ==
Basalt guinea flower is only known from basalt areas between Pontville and Bridgewater near the lower reaches of the Jordan River in Tasmania, where it grows in areas of native grassland.

== Conservation status ==
Hibbertia basaltica is listed as "endangered" under the Australia Government Environment Protection and Biodiversity Conservation Act 1999 and the Tasmanian Government Threatened Species Protection Act 1995.

== See also ==
- List of Hibbertia species
