= Mangalore, Tasmania =

Mangalore
- Town
- Coordinates: 42°39′S 147°15′E
- Country: Australia
- State: Tasmania
- Region: Hobart, Central
- LGA: Brighton, Southern Midlands
- Location: 7 km (4.3 mi) N of Brighton

Government
  - State electorate: Lyons
  - Federal division: Lyons

Population
  - Total: 422 (2016 census)
- Postcode: 7030
Localities around Mangalore
Bagdad	Bagdad	Campania
Broadmarsh	Mangalore	Tea Tree
Broadmarsh	Pontville	Brighton

Mangalore is a rural locality in the local government areas (LGA) of Brighton and Southern Midlands in the Hobart and Central LGA regions of Tasmania. The locality is about 7 kilometres (4.3 mi) north of the town of Brighton. The 2016 census recorded a population of 422 for the state suburb of Mangalore. It is between the townships of Bagdad and Brighton, on the Midland Highway 32 km from the capital city of Hobart.

== History ==
Mangalore was gazetted as a locality in 1970. It is named after the city of the same name in the Indian state of Karnataka.

Mangalore Post Office opened on 1 August 1891 and closed in 1969.

== Geography ==
The Jordan River forms part of the southern boundary.

== Road infrastructure ==
The Midland Highway (National Route 1) passes through from south-east to north-west. Route C186 (Black Brush Road) starts at an intersection with Route 1 and runs south-west until it exits.
