= Jordan River Bridge =

Bridge in Tasmania, Australia

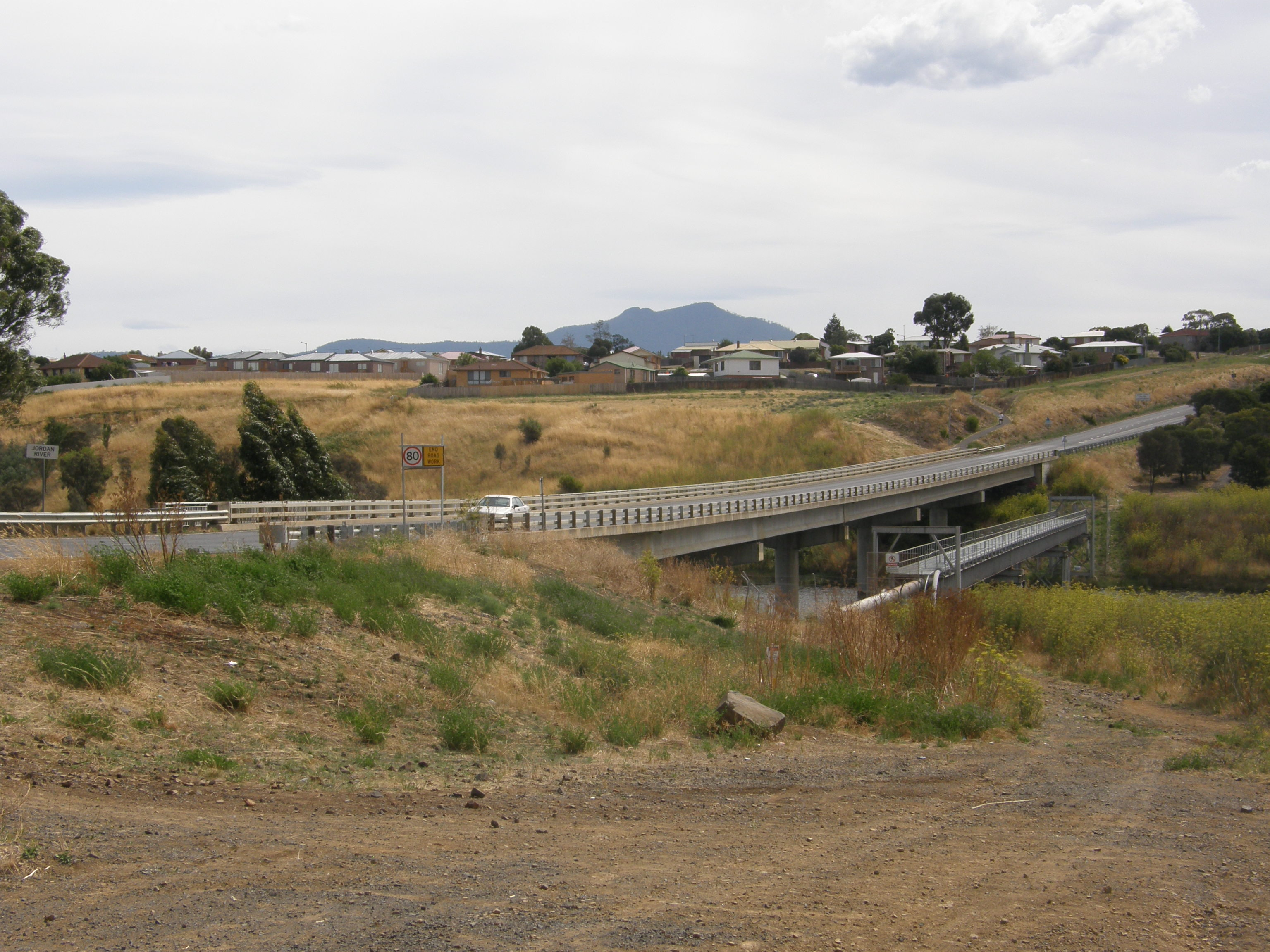
- Coordinates: 42°44′44.65″S 147°15′24.56″E
- Carries: East Derwent Highway
- Crosses: Jordan River
- Locale: Bridgewater – Gagebrook, Hobart, Tasmania, Australia
- Maintained by: Building Tasmania

Characteristics
- Design: Concrete girder bridge

History
- Opened: 1974

Location
- Interactive map of Jordan River Bridge

The Jordan River Bridge is a concrete road bridge spanning the Jordan River in the northern suburbs of Hobart, Tasmania, Australia. It forms part of the East Derwent Highway, connecting the suburbs of Bridgewater and Gagebrook.

== History and construction ==
The bridge was constructed in 1974 as part of the East Derwent Highway project, designed to improve connectivity between Hobart’s northern suburbs and the Midland Highway. The bridge provides a vital link for local traffic, reducing congestion on the nearby Bridgewater Bridge.

== Design and features ==
The Jordan River Bridge is a two-lane concrete girder bridge with pedestrian access on both sides. It accommodates both vehicular and pedestrian traffic, serving as an essential crossing for residents of the surrounding suburbs. The bridge is maintained by the Building Tasmania, which oversees road infrastructure in Tasmania.

== Significance ==
The bridge plays a crucial role in local transport infrastructure, facilitating movement between residential areas and connecting to major transport routes. It also provides pedestrian access, supporting connectivity for non-motorised commuters.
