= Green Point, Tasmania =

Green Point
- Suburb
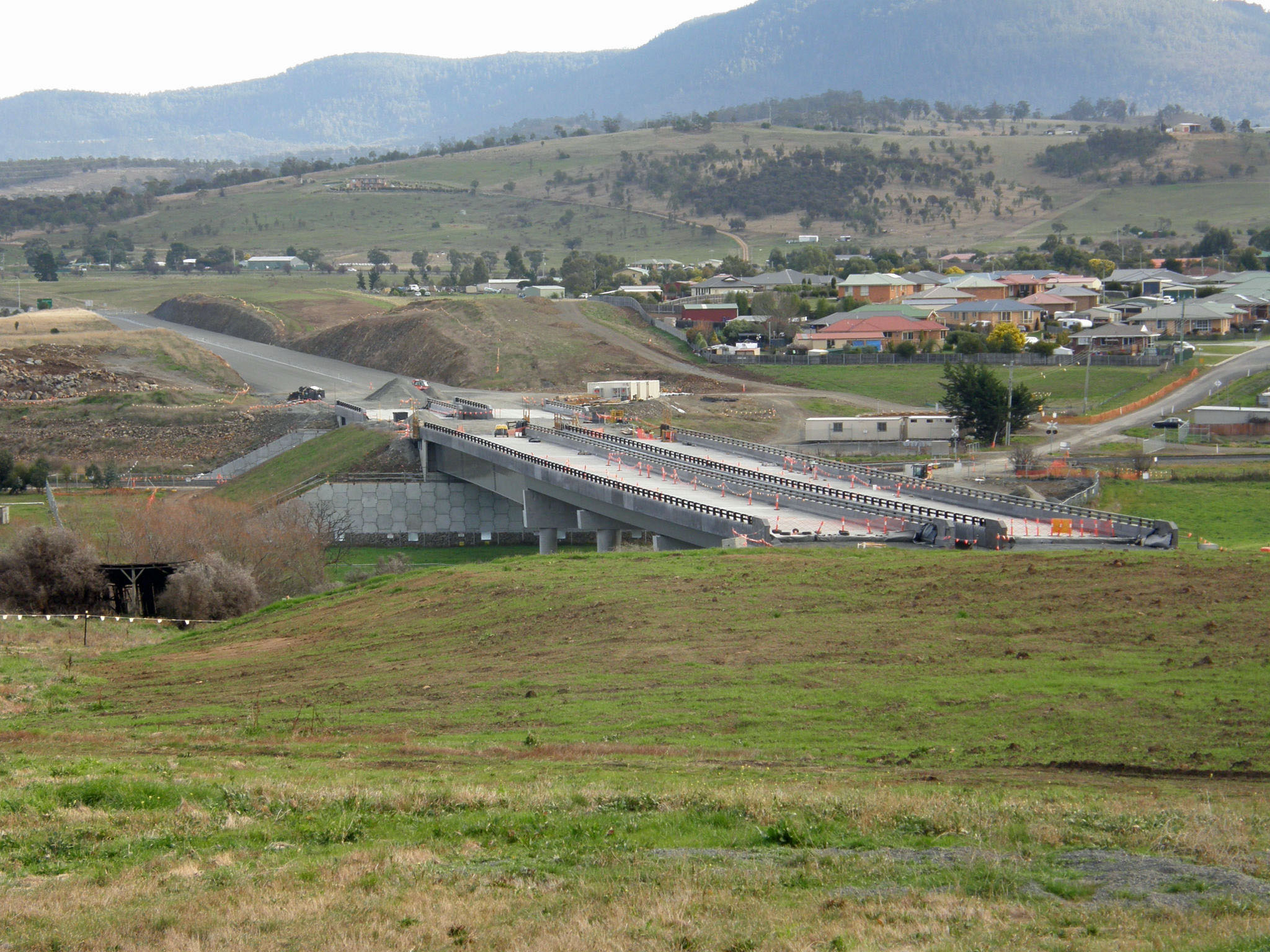
- Green Point visible on the other side of the Jordan River Bridge from Herdsmans Cove

- Interactive map of Green Point
- Coordinates: 42°44′26″S 147°14′45″E
- Country: Australia
- State: Tasmania
- City: Hobart
- LGA: Municipality of Brighton
- Postcode: 7030
Suburbs around Green Point
Bridgewater	Bridgewater	Bridgewater
River Derwent	Green Point	Gagebrook
River Derwent	River Derwent	Gagebrook

Green Point, Tasmania, is a far northern suburb of Hobart. It is generally considered by locals to be a part of Bridgewater.
