= Honeywood, Tasmania =

Locality in Tasmania, Australia

Honeywood
- Town
- Coordinates: 42°43′35″S 147°16′46″E
- Country: Australia
- State: Tasmania
- Region: Hobart
- LGA: Brighton
- Location: 5 km (3.1 mi) SE of Brighton

Government
  - State electorate: Lyons
  - Federal division: Lyons

Population
  - Total: 501 (2016 census)
- Postcode: 7017
Localities around Honeywood
Brighton	Brighton, Tea Tree	Tea Tree
Bridgewater	Honeywood	Tea Tree, Old Beach
Bridgewater	Gagebrook, Old Beach	Old Beach

Honeywood is a rural residential locality in the local government area of Brighton in the Hobart region of Tasmania. It is located about 5 kilometres (3.1 mi) south-east of the town of Brighton. The 2016 census determined a population of 501 for the state suburb of Honeywood.

== History ==
Honeywood is a confirmed suburb/locality.

== Geography ==
The Jordan River forms most of the western boundary.

== Road infrastructure ==
The C326 route (Briggs Road / Cove Hill Road) enters from the south and runs through to the west, where it exits. Route C325 (a continuation of Briggs Road) starts at an intersection with C326 and runs north until it exits.
