= Magra, Tasmania =

Magra
- Town
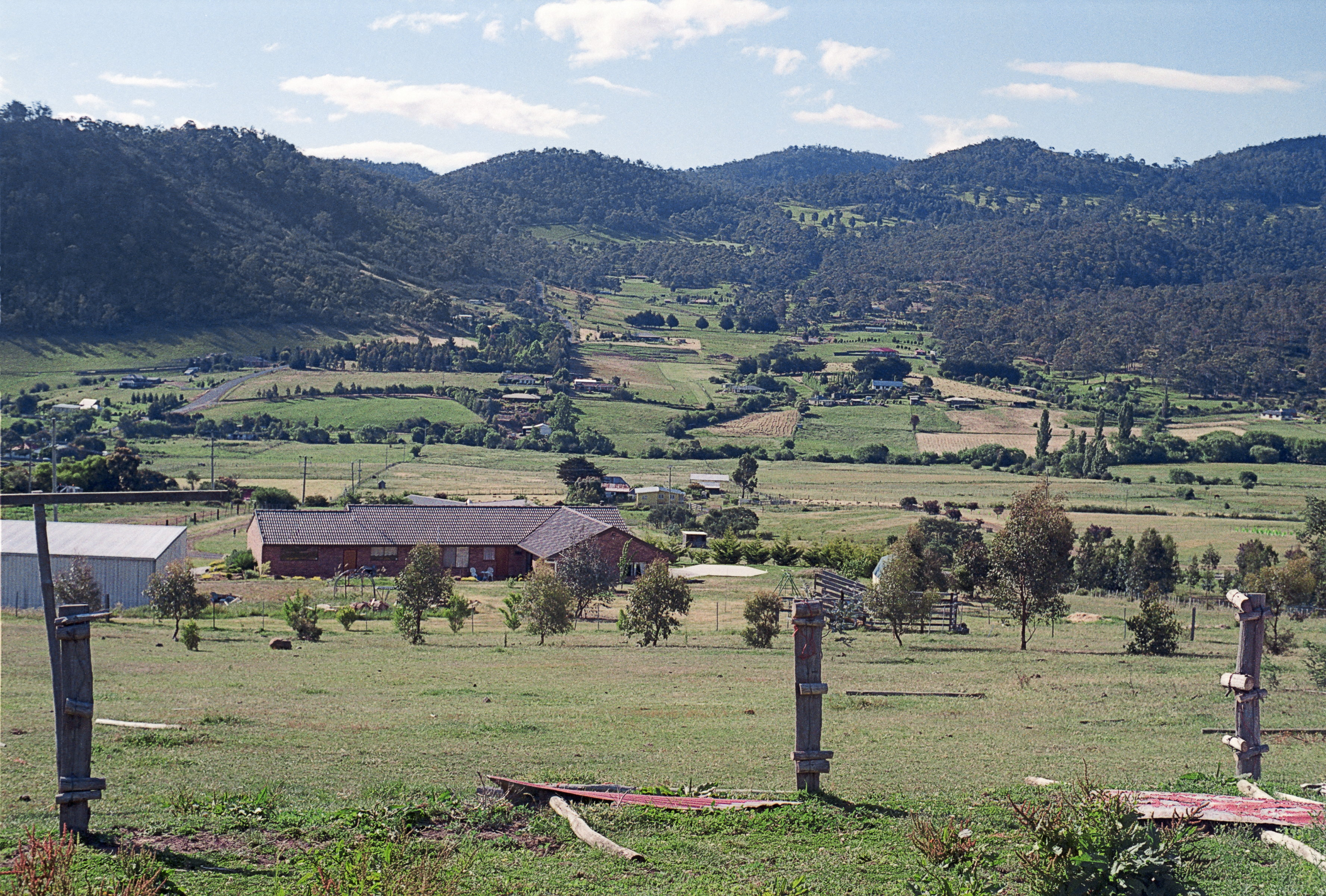
- Magra area, looking north

- Coordinates: 42°45′30″S 147°02′50″E
- Country: Australia
- State: Tasmania
- Region: Hobart, Central, South-east
- LGA: Derwent Valley, Southern Midlands, Brighton
- Location: 38 km (24 mi) NW of Hobart; 3 km (1.9 mi) N of New Norfolk, Tasmania; 26 km (16 mi) W of Brighton

Government
  - State electorate: Lyons
  - Federal division: Lyons

Population
  - Total: 699 (2016 census)
- Postcode: 7140
Localities around Magra
Black Hills	Broadmarsh	Dromedary, Magra
Black Hills	Magra	Dromedary
Lawitta	New Norfolk	New Norfolk, Boyer

Magra is a rural residential locality in the local government areas (LGA) of Brighton (7%), Southern Midlands (9%) and Derwent Valley (84%) in the Hobart, Central and South-east LGA regions of Tasmania. The locality is about 26 kilometres (16 mi) west of the town of Brighton. The 2016 census recorded a population of 699 for the state suburb of Magra. It is in the Derwent Valley a few kilometres north of New Norfolk.

== Location and features ==
Magra is just over the hill from New Norfolk. It consists mainly of dwelling houses and farmland. Accommodation is also available as the area is popular with tourists. Notable features of Magra itself include the surrounding hills and the plantation of Lombardy Poplars. The site of the grave of Betty King, believed to be the first European white woman to set foot on Australian soil, is located in the vicinity of Magra.

== History ==
Magra was gazetted as a locality in 1970. It was previously known as Black River; the name was changed about 1912. It is believed to be an Aboriginal word for "day".

Stanton Farmhouse, built in 1817 is located in Magra on Back River Road.

Magra Post Office opened on 1 June 1911 and closed in 1968.

== Geography ==
Most of the boundaries are survey lines.

== Road infrastructure ==
Route C184 (Black Hills Road) passes through the south-west corner.
