= Bridgewater Bridge =

Road bridge in Tasmania, Australia

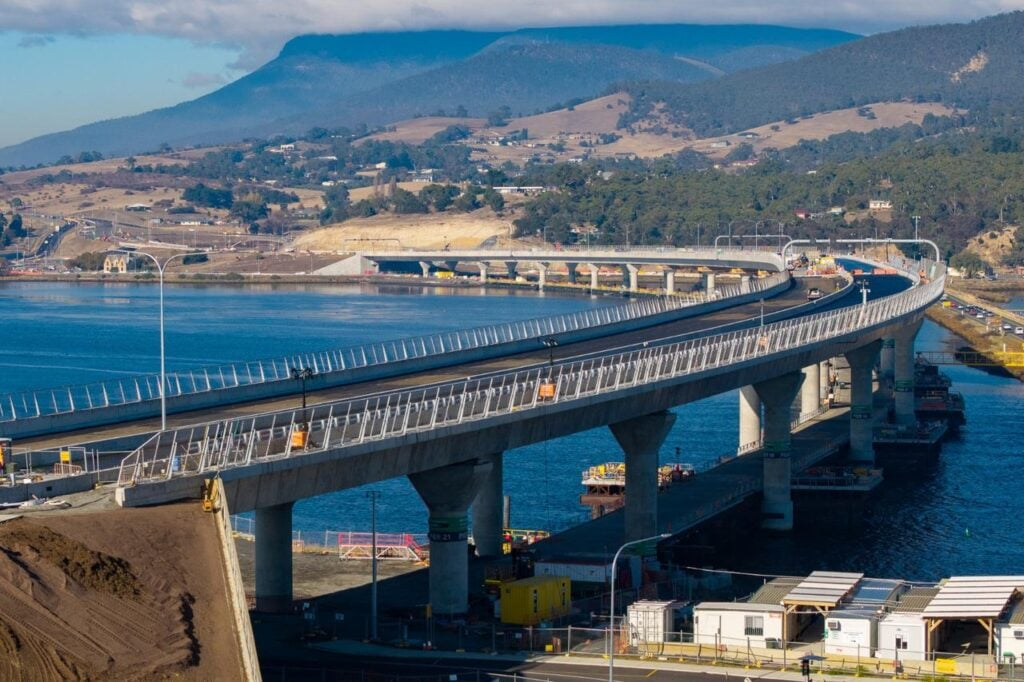
- The Bridgewater Bridge
- Coordinates: 42°44′42″S 147°13′33″E
- Carries: Midland Highway
- Crosses: River Derwent
- Locale: Hobart, Tasmania, Australia
- Begins: Granton
- Ends: Bridgewater
- Named for: Bridgewater
- Owner: Building Tasmania
- Preceded by: Blair Street Bridge
- Followed by: Bowen Bridge

Characteristics
- Design: Box girder
- Material: Concrete
- Total length: 1.2 km (0.7 mi)
- Clearance below: 16 m (52.5 ft)
- No. of lanes: 4

History
- Constructed by: McConnell Dowell
- Construction start: October 2022
- Opened: 1 June 2025
- Replaces: Truss bridge with vertical lift (1946-2025)

Location
- Interactive map of Bridgewater Bridge

The Bridgewater Bridge is a 1.2-kilometre-long (0.7 mi) concrete box girder bridge that carries the Midland Highway across the River Derwent in Hobart, Tasmania, Australia. This bridge connects the Hobart suburbs of Bridgewater and Granton. It accommodates a four-lane highway and a grade-separated footpath and cycle lane. It is the fifth such bridge at this location to carry this name.

The bridge was funded by the Australian and Tasmanian Governments at a cost of $786 million and constructed by McConnell Dowell. It is expected to service 22,000 trips per day. It is the first bridge at the location to have a marine navigation clearance of greater than 16 metres - consistent with the Bowen Bridge.

It was opened in June 2025 to replace the fourth Bridgewater Bridge (Bridgewater Bridge and Causeway), a steel truss vertical-lift bridge and specially-built causeway. This was a two-lane road bridge that also carried the South Railway Line until its closure in 2014. This bridge had been in operation since 1946, and was the oldest surviving lift span bridge in Australia; lifting of the bridge caused considerable traffic delays in the bridge's final years.

== Previous structures ==
The Bridgewater Bridge was among the first bridges constructed in Tasmania after British settlement in 1803, and gave its name to the nearby suburb of Bridgewater. Lieutenant-Governor George Arthur commissioned the construction of the bridge and causeway to connect the Launceston – Hobart Trunk Road, linking both Tasmanian towns and providing easier access to farmlands in the interior of Tasmania.

=== The causeway ===
Construction commenced on the bridge in 1829. Operations were supervised by Roderic O'Connor. The causeway, which was constructed first, was built by a workforce of 200 convicts who had been sentenced to secondary punishment. These convicts, using nothing but wheelbarrows, shovels and picks and muscle power, shifted 2 million tonnes (2.2 million short tons) of soil, stones and clay. The finished causeway stretched 1.3 kilometres (1 mi), although did not span the full width of the Derwent. The original plan apparently called for a viaduct, but this plan was abandoned and the half-built arches were filled in to form the present causeway.

=== Early bridges ===
Upon completion of the causeway, a punt operated across the deep, navigable section of the river, but could not cope with traffic demands. To resolve this issue, an Act of Parliament was passed in 1846 to enable construction of a bridge. The accepted design was a timber bridge, was by the firm of architect and former convict James Blackburn. Being a sliding bridge, it could slide back to allow shipping to pass through. Construction started in 1848, and opened to traffic in April 1849.

In the early 1870s, the Tasmanian Main Line Railway called for widening of the causeway so the railway could be laid on the downstream side. A second bridge was built alongside the first, parallel to it. The northern abutment was about 50 feet downstream from the road bridge. This bridge featured a swing span opening. Construction commenced in 1869 and it was completed 1874.

On 22 July 1886, a train from the north was passing over the bridge when the engine left the tracks and tipped over, hanging precariously above the water on the edge of the southern end of the swing bridge. Two people, fireman William Shaw and passenger Daniel Turner, died as a result of the accident. The driver was injured. The locomotive was salvageable. The cause of the accident was found to be that the rails failed to match properly when the bridge was closed, so the bridge was modified again to solve this problem.

In 1891 a new bridge was built on the upstream side of the road and rail bridges, and this too, had an opening swing span. Although initially planned as a road crossing, this bridge was designed to be a permanent railway bridge, and was built as a straight line extension of the causeway, with the northern abutment being some 60 metres upstream from the other bridges. When this third bridge was completed in 1893, it was initially used as road bridge, to divert traffic off the 1849 road bridge which was deteriorating rapidly. For six years there were three bridges crossing the Derwent simultaneously, as it was not until 1899 that the 1849 draw-back bridge (the first bridge) was finally dismantled. The introduction of heavier locomotives necessitated the transfer of the railway to the 1893 bridge. In 1907-08 the causeway was widened again, this time on the upstream side, and the tracks laid flush in the centre of the roadway on the 1893 bridge. This would be Bridgewater's modern joint road-rail bridge going forward, but would not be without problems. Road users complained of delays from waiting for trains to cross and the frequent opening of the swing span for river craft lead to near misses and irked local residents. A public meeting was held and the State Government was pressured to make the old 1874 TMLR railway bridge available for road traffic. New piles were added to the 1874 rail bridge, the rails lifted, and the deck converted to a roadway. By November 1908 both bridges had swapped roles: the 1893 road bridge became a railway bridge (as always intended), and the old 1874 railway bridge had now become a road bridge (as never intended). The concrete and steel caisson pivot and the sandstone abutments of the 1893 road/railway bridge are still standing and can be viewed on the upstream or left side of the present bridge as one travels towards the north.

Both the first and second bridges did not run straight off the end of the causeway; rather, they turned slightly to the right, or downstream. The first swing bridge (originally the TMLR rail bridge) was left standing when the present lifting bridge was being constructed to prevent traffic stoppages, so the present bridge deviates from the causeway quite appreciably.

=== Fourth bridge ===
Bridgewater Bridge
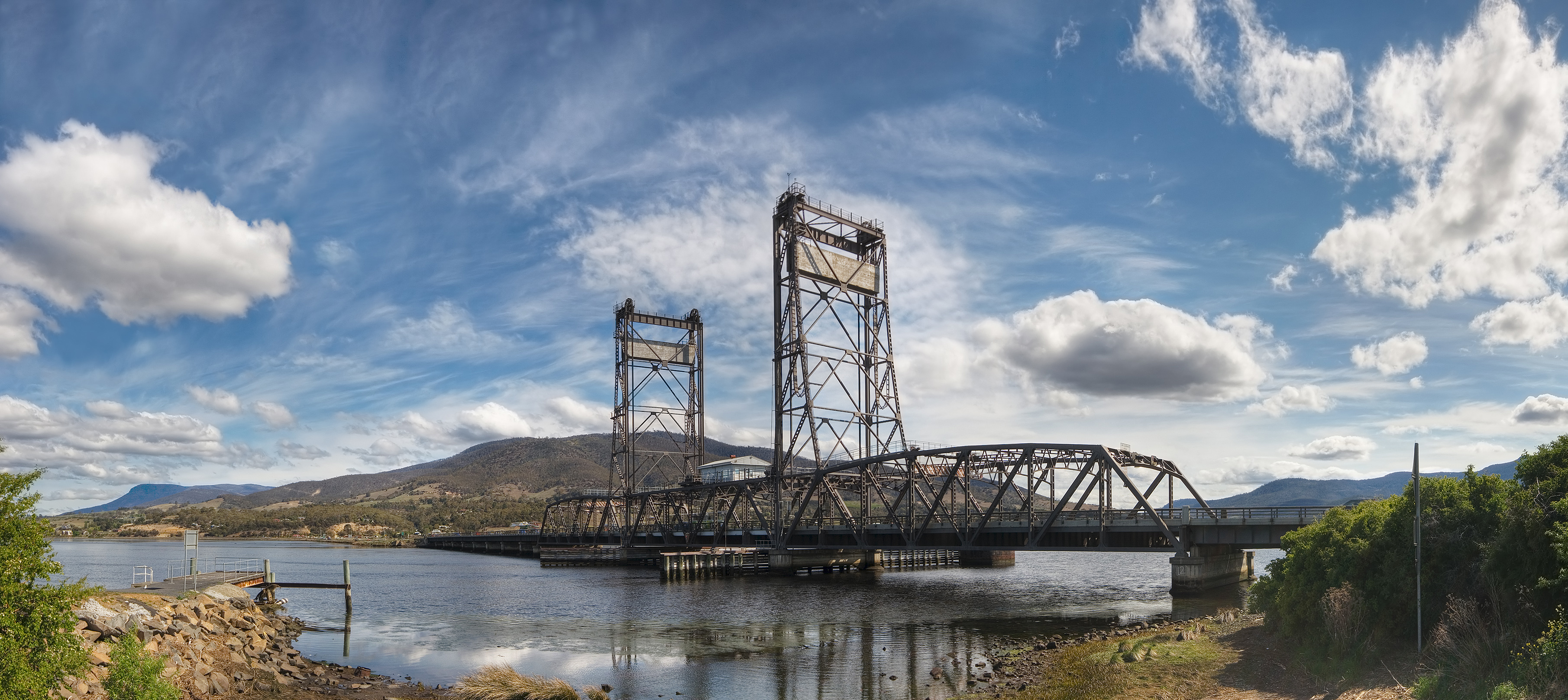
- Fourth Bridgewater Bridge (1946-2025)
- Coordinates: 42°44′27″S 147°13′31″E
- Carries: Midland Highway; South Railway Line
- Crosses: River Derwent
- Locale: Hobart, Tasmania, Australia
- Begins: Granton
- Ends: Bridgewater
- Named for: Bridgewater
- Owner: Department of State Growth

Characteristics
- Design: Truss bridge with vertical lift
- Material: Steel
- Piers in water: 13
- No. of lanes: 2

Rail characteristics
- No. of tracks: 1
- Track gauge: 1,067 mm (3 ft 6 in)

History
- Construction start: 1939
- Opened: 1946
- Closed: 2025
- Replaces: Swing punt (c. 1900s-1946)
- Replaced by: Four-lane concrete box girder

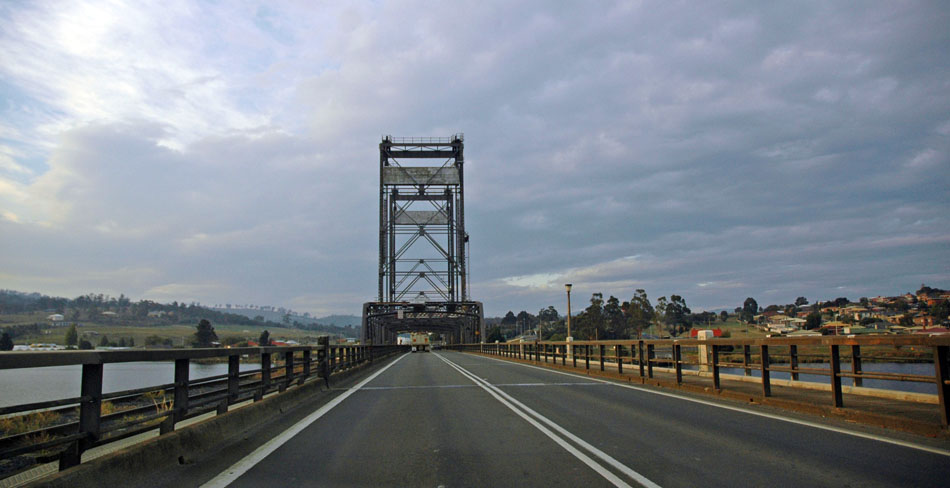
The Bridgewater Bridge (facing north). The rail line runs on the left (west side) of the causeway and bridge.

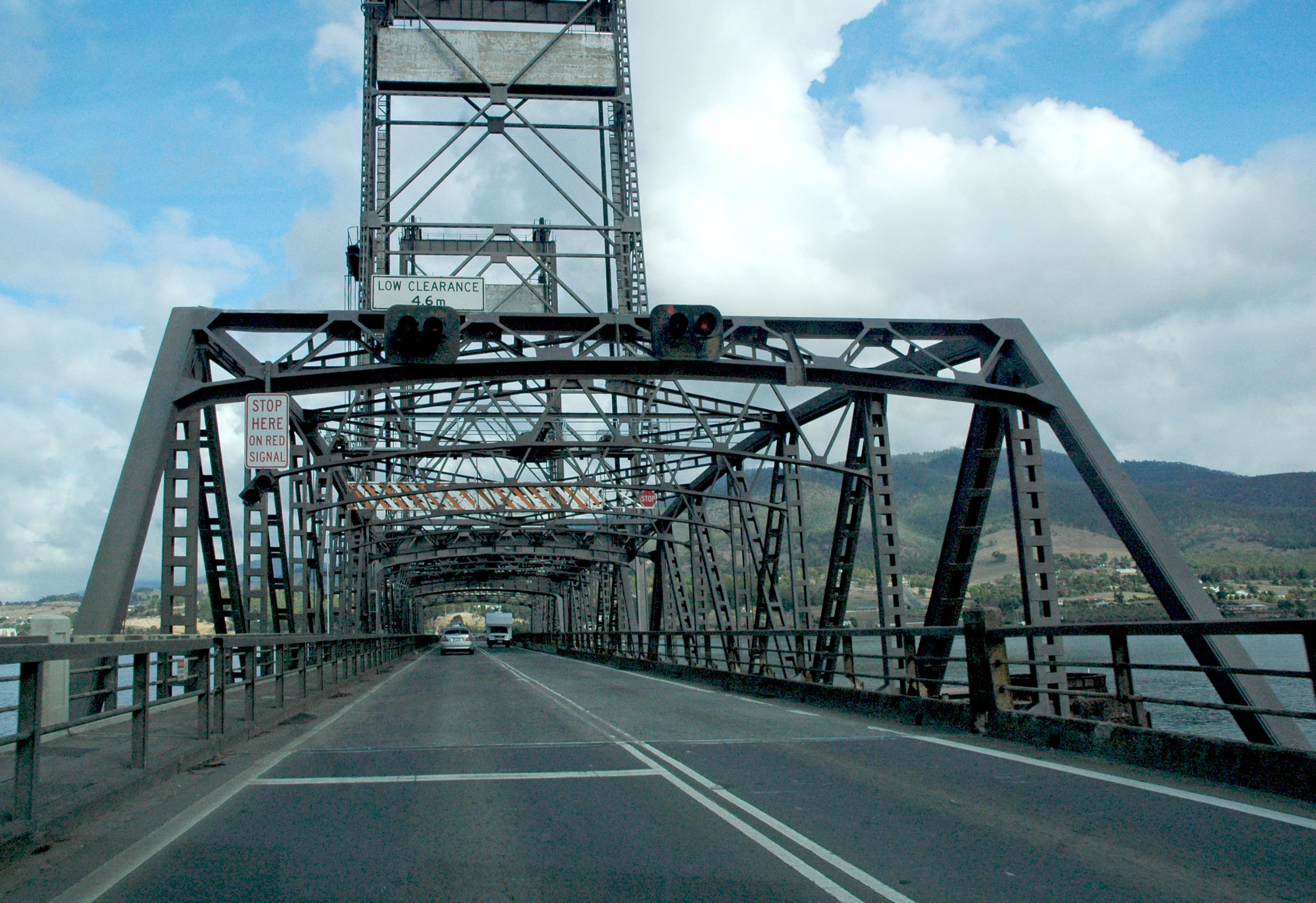
The Bridgewater Bridge, Tasmania, from the northern access near the town of Bridgewater (facing south).

Construction on the steel vertical lift bridge across the Derwent began in 1939. Construction was interrupted by World War II; the bridge opened to road traffic in March 1942, with completion of the lifting segment finally completed in early 1946. The bridge opened to rail traffic in late 1946. It consists of a long concrete bridge that leads off the end of the causeway, and a steel lifting section just before the northern bank of the river. The lifting section is one of only a few remaining in the Southern Hemisphere, and is the largest of its kind remaining in Australia. The bridge was designed to last a century without replacement. A small control house stands on the lifting section. Inside are the switches and locks which operate the bridge.

Until 1984, the Australian Newsprint Mills at Boyer moved all its produce by river. Barges were used to transport paper from the mill to the storage sheds at Pavilion Point at Hobart, and for this reason the bridge was required to open very frequently. Consequently, a bridge-keeper lived on-site and opened and closed the bridge when required. However, when the decision was made to cease river transportation, an on-site keeper was no longer necessary, so bridge openings became less frequent.

In response to vandalism of the house which contains the bridge operating controls, closed-circuit television cameras were installed along the lifting span sometime between 2003 and 2005.

On 30 October 2006 a fault was found in one of the steel cables holding up the two 170-tonne (190-short-ton) concrete counterweights above the road, forcing the temporary closure of the bridge. This closure caused peak hour traffic delays, mainly along the East Derwent Highway, due to traffic being diverted over the Bowen and Tasman bridges. The cables, which were put in place in 1994, were supposed to have a 20-year lifespan and had lasted barely over half that time.

From 2006 until 2010, the lifting segment of the Bridgewater Bridge was out of commission, due to failed maintenance. The State Government spent $14 million to refurbish the bridge and provide it with a further 15 years of life, until a replacement could be built. This refurbishment replaced the vandalised control house and its controls and all of the cabling to raise and lower the bridge. Touted as a "major tourist attraction" with expected regular openings for tourist and private vessels to travel between Hobart and New Norfolk, the bridge refurbishment was a failure, only successfully opening a handful of times.

Rail services ceased using the bridge when the South Line was cut back to terminate at the Brighton Transport Hub in June 2014. The bridge received an Engineering Heritage Marker from Engineers Australia in 2018 as part of its Engineering Heritage Recognition Program.

Following the opening of the new Bridgewater Bridge, the old bridge started to be demolished in October 2025 and is expected to conclude in mid-2026. Upon completion on-water vessels will be able to travel upstream of Bridgewater towards the Derwent Valley.

== Fifth bridge ==
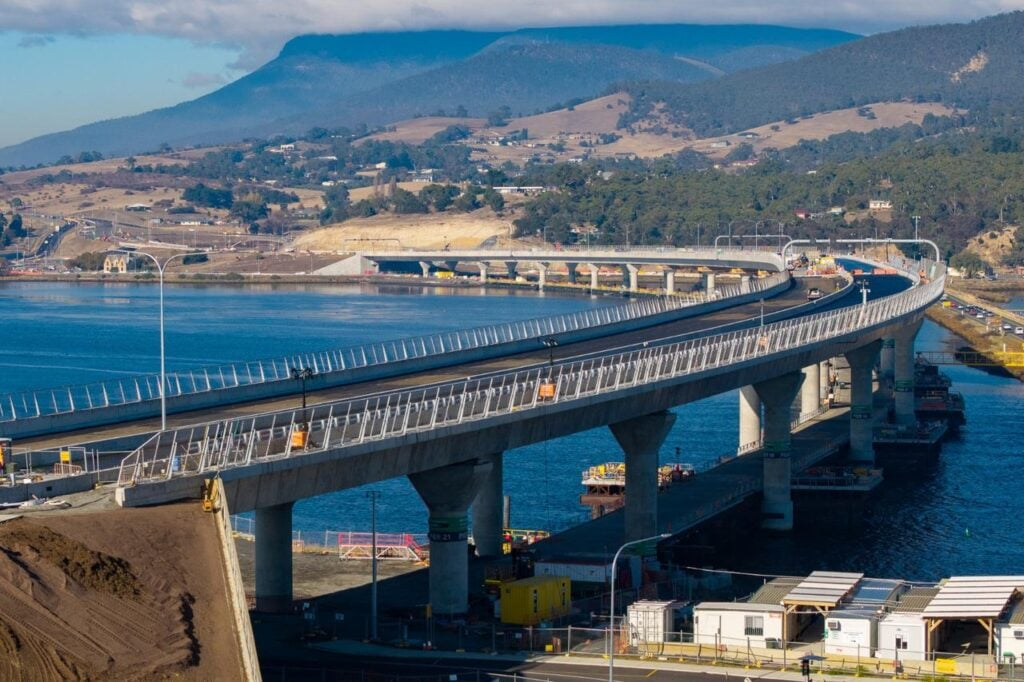
New Bridgewater Bridge in final stages of construction

Between 2001 and 2005, the Australian Government set aside $100 million towards the replacement of the Bridgewater Bridge, soon after the Tasmanian Government decided to build the replacement to the south of the existing bridge. However, after years of inaction the State government has encountered some heritage issues with replacing the bridge and is to be replaced as part of the final stage of the Brighton Bypass and Midland Highway upgrade.

Towards the end of 2010, the State government released plans for a new River Derwent crossing, next to the existing bridge. The new bridge would carry the Midland Highway and the old bridge will be left open for rail, pedestrian and local traffic. While the Bridgewater Bridge is recognised as being limited in its ability to perform the function of the Midland Highway, it also has important heritage values and is recognised as a landmark in the area.

In March 2016, Infrastructure Tasmania published its review of a design and cost estimate for the construction of a replacement structure for the existing Bridgewater Bridge, which considered various options for a replacement structure and provided advice as to the most feasible crossing solution. As part of the 2018–19 federal budget, the Australian Government announced a $461 million grant towards the construction of a new Bridgewater Bridge, representing 80 per cent of the expected total construction cost. The Tasmanian Government is expected to contribute $115 million. Construction was expected to commence in 2019; however, following independent assessment of the project by Infrastructure Australia in July 2019, the evaluation identified a range of issues, which may add to costs and require further work to address, and recommended that the Tasmanian Government revise its business case. The project was scheduled to start design and approvals in 2019, with the design to be agreed by the end of 2020. Substantive construction was expected to commence in 2022 and completion was targeted in 2024.

The project scope also included re-configuration of the interchanges at Granton and Bridgewater to provide grade-separated access.

The bridge officially opened to traffic on the evening of 1 June 2025, following a community walk over the bridge earlier that day. The first vehicle to cross the bridge was a vintage 1910 Star Roadster, carrying two women, Margaret McMaster and Barbara Jones, who were present at the previous bridge's opening in 1946.

The bridge includes two fixed speed cameras and two electronic variable-message signs.
