= Herdsmans Cove =

- Suburb
- Interactive map of Herdsmans Cove
- Coordinates: 42°45′00″S 147°15′51″E
- Country: Australia
- State: Tasmania
- Region: Hobart
- City: Hobart
- LGA: Brighton
- Location: 8 km (5.0 mi) S of Brighton

Government
  - State electorate: Lyons
  - Federal division: Lyons

Population
  - Total: 1,120 (2016 census)
- Postcode: 7030
Suburbs around Herdsmans Cove
Jordan River	Gagebrook	Gagebrook
Jordan River	Herdsmans Cove	Gagebrook, Old Beach
Jordan River	Jordan River	Old Beach

Herdsmans Cove is a residential locality in the local government area (LGA) of Brighton in the Hobart LGA region of Tasmania. The locality is about 8 kilometres (5.0 mi) south of the town of Brighton. The 2016 census recorded a population of 1120 for the state suburb of Herdsmans Cove.

== History ==
Herdsmans Cove was gazetted as a locality in 2009. It was previously part of Gagebrook. It takes its name from the body of water to its south.

== Geography ==
The Jordan River forms the western boundary. The waters of the Jordan River Estuary, also known as Herdsmans Cove, form most of the southern boundary. The East Derwent Highway forms the northern and eastern boundaries.

== Road infrastructure ==
Route B32 (East Derwent Highway) passes to the north and east. Access is provided by Gage Road.
