= Jordan River Learning Federation =

School in Tasmania, Australia

Location
- Greenpoint Road; Bridgewater, Hobart, Tasmania; Australia; 42°44′14″S 147°14′29″E

Information
- Type: Government comprehensive early learning centre, primary and secondary school, trade training centre, and school farm
- Established: 15 March 1977; 49 years ago (as Bridgewater High School)
- Status: Open
- School district: Southern
- Educational authority: Department for Education, Children and Young People
- Oversight: Office of Tasmanian Assessment, Standards & Certification
- Teaching staff: 29.5 FTE (2019)
- Years: 7–12
- Gender: Co-educational
- Enrolment: 313 (2019: Years 7–12)
- Campus type: Suburban
- Website: jrlfsenior.education.tas.edu.au

The Jordan River Learning Federation (abbreviated as JRLF) is a government co-educational comprehensive early learning centre, primary and secondary school, trade training centre, and school farm located in Bridgewater, a northern suburb of Hobart, Tasmania, Australia. Established in 1957 as Bridgewater High School, the school caters for approximately 300 students from birth to Year K and then to 12. The school is administered by the Department for Education, Children and Young People.

In 2019 student enrolments for the high school were 313.

== Organisational structure ==
As a federation of schools, the JRLF comprises:

- Three primary campuses that cater for students from birth to Year 6
- A Senior School campus for students in Years 7 to 12.
- A Trade Training Centre catering for students who wish to focus on specific skills-based vocational education and training courses, and
- A School Farm at Brighton providing agricultural education to all year levels. Meat and Vegetables/ Fruit produced at the farm are used in the Senior School's hot lunch program.

The school campuses are located approximately 21 kilometres (13 mi) north of central Hobart. The school sites feature well landscaped grounds with up-to-date play equipment. The schools draw students from Bridgewater and surrounding suburbs and towns as far north as Oatlands and as far south as Kingston and Sorell, with a varied intake each year.

== See also ==
- List of schools in Tasmania
- Education in Tasmania
