= East Derwent Highway =

Highway in Hobart, Tasmania, Australia

East Derwent Highway Tasmania
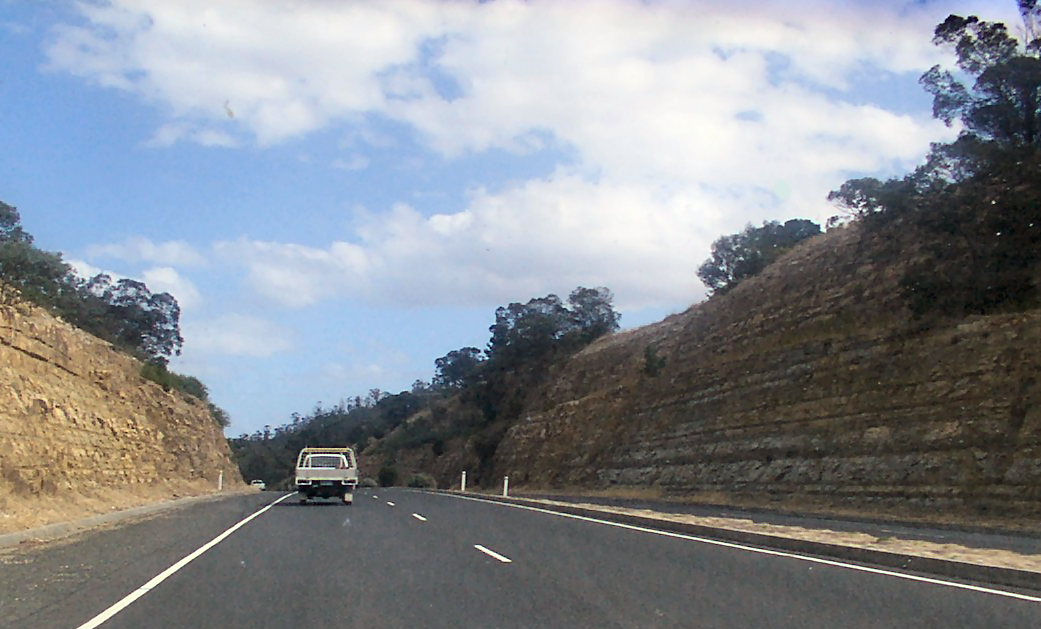
- East Derwent Highway at Geilston Bay
- Coordinates: 42.732893°S 147.237114°E (North end); 42.861969°S 147.354997°E (South end)

General information
- Type: Highway
- Length: 22.5 km (14 mi)
- Route number(s): B32

Major junctions
- North end: Midland Highway; Bridgewater, Tasmania
- Old Beach Road; Baskerville Road; Goodwood Road
- South end: Tasman Highway; Rose Bay, Tasmania

Location(s)
- Region: Hobart
- Major suburbs: Gagebrook, Old Beach, Otago, Geilston Bay, Lindisfarne

Highway system
- Highways in Australia; National Highway • Freeways in Australia; Highways in Tasmania

The East Derwent Highway (route number B32) is a highway in Hobart, Tasmania, Australia. The highway is a trunk road that carries heavy commuter traffic, much like the Brooker Highway, on the eastern side of the River Derwent.

== Route ==
The highway starts at the roundabout with Midland Highway at Bridgewater and heads south as a dual-lane, single carriageway road, connecting with the Bowen Bridge over the River Derwent, widening to a four-lane, dual-carriageway road through Risdon, narrowing again to a dual-lane, single-carriageway road through Geilston Bay, and then widening to a four-lane, single-carriageway road to eventually terminate at the Lindisfarne Interchange at Rose Bay, near the eastern side of the Tasman Bridge leading into central Hobart.

== Exits and intersections ==
LGA	Location	km	mi	Destinations	Notes
Brighton	Bridgewater	0.0	0.0	Midland Highway (National Highway 1) – Hobart, Kempton, Launceston	Northern terminus of highway and route B32 at roundabout
Brighton	Bridgewater	0.4	0.25	Cove Hill Road (C326) – Honeywood	
Jordan River		2.2	1.4	Jordan River Bridge	
Brighton	Old Beach	5.9	3.7	Old Beach Road (C326) – Honeywood, Brighton	
Brighton	Old Beach	7.7	4.8	Baskerville Road (C327) – Honeywood	
Clarence	Risdon	13.6	8.5	Goodwood Road (B35) – Glenorchy	
Clarence	Risdon Vale	15.9	9.9	Grasstree Hill Road (C324) – Grasstree Hill, Richmond	
Clarence	Lindisfarne	20.6	12.8	Gordons Hill Road – Rosny, Mornington	
Clarence	Rose Bay	22.5	14.0	Tasman Highway (A3) – Hobart, Cambridge, Sorell	Southern terminus of highway and route B32 at Lindisfarne Interchange
Route transition

== See also ==
- Highways in Australia
- List of highways in Tasmania
