= Dromedary, Tasmania =

Locality in Tasmania, Australia

Dromedary Tasmania
- Coordinates: 42°43′44″S 147°08′55″E
- Population: 732 (2016 census)
- Postcode(s): 7030
- Location: 14 km (9 mi) W of Brighton
- LGA(s): Southern Midlands, Brighton
- Region: Central, Hobart
- State electorate(s): Lyons
- Federal division(s): Lyons
Localities around Dromedary:
Broadmarsh	Broadmarsh	Broadmarsh
Magra, Boyer	Dromedary	Bridgewater
Boyer	Granton	Bridgewater

Dromedary is a rural residential locality in the local government areas (LGA) of Southern Midlands and Brighton in the Central and Hobart LGA regions of Tasmania. The locality is about 14 kilometres (8.7 mi) west of the town of Brighton. The 2016 census recorded a population of 732 for the state suburb of Dromedary.

== History ==
Dromedary was gazetted as a locality in 1970.

Mount Dromedary, which is in the locality, was so named in 1794 by Captain John Hayes because of its resemblance to a camel.

== Geography ==
Many of the boundaries of the locality consist of survey lines. The Derwent River forms the south-eastern boundary.

== Road infrastructure ==
Route B10 (Boyer Road) passes through from south-east to south-west.
