= Bridgewater Jerry =

Fog formation in Tasmania, Australia

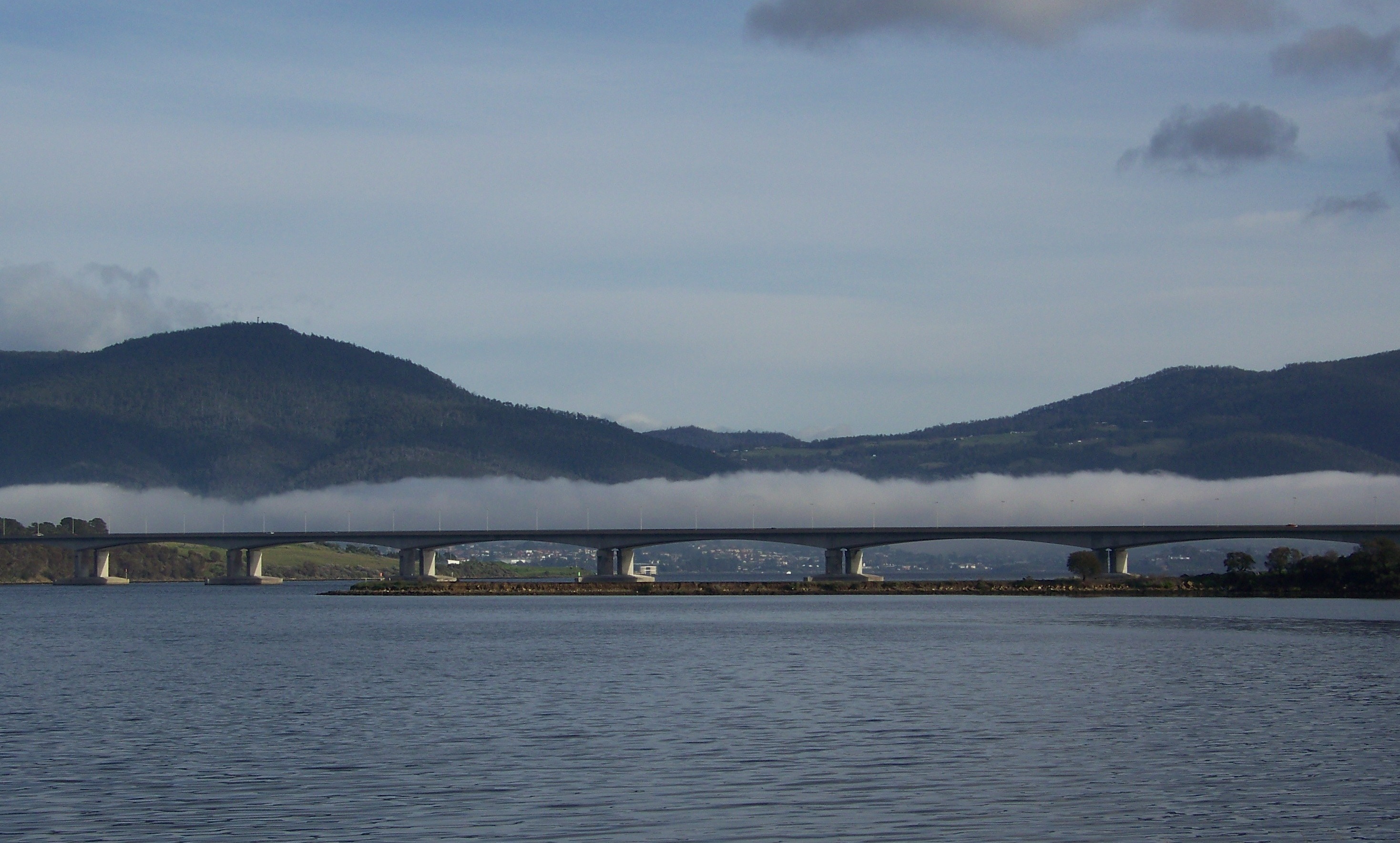
The Bridgewater Jerry over the Bowen Bridge.

Bridgewater Jerry is a fog formation that occasionally appears over the River Derwent in Hobart, Tasmania and down the Derwent Valley. It is named after the suburb of Bridgewater, and the word "jerry" may have come from convict slang for 'fog' or 'mist'. It was probably first described in 1821, when Governor Lachlan Macquarie was stranded at Austin's Ferry because of fog.

The Bridgewater Jerry forms at night during the cooler months when cold air comes down the surrounding hills as katabatic winds and collects in the Derwent Valley.

During winter, the Bridgewater Jerry occurs once or twice a week.

== Community responses ==
The local community has a strong appreciation for the Bridgewater Jerry, which is expressed through online community groups dedicated the phenomenon, as well as photography competitions, sculptures and performances.

In 2008 a sculpture dedicated to the fog, by Tasmanian artist Tony Woodward, was installed at Greenpoint Plaza in Bridgewater. The mosaic-based sculpture depicts a human figure - the fog personified - cradling a miniature town.

In July 2023, Hobart-based artist Hannah Foley presented a series of contemporary performances on the river's commuter ferry boat, during its early morning services. These ritualistic performances, titled Wet Breath Exchange, were said to be created in collaboration with the Bridgewater Jerry, and aimed to draw attention to the material exchange between human bodies and the body of fog through breath. At this time, Foley also launched a participatory online artwork called Aeriform Archive: a website which acts as a platform for a community generated archive of embodied experiences with the fog, and also provides a 7-day Bridgewater Jerry forecast. The forecast was made with the assistance of meteorologist Michael Conway of the Bureau of Meteorology.
