= Green Point =

Green Point may refer to:

- Green Point (Antarctica)
- Green Point, Cape Town, South Africa
- Green Point, Newfoundland, Canada
- Green Point, New South Wales, Australia
- Green Point, Tasmania, Australia

== See also ==
- Greenpoint (disambiguation)
