= Broadmarsh, Tasmania =

Locality in Tasmania, Australia

Broadmarsh Tasmania
- Coordinates: 42°41′20″S 147°08′10″E
- Population: 167 (2016 census)
- Postcode(s): 7030
- Location: 23 km (14 mi) NE of New Norfolk
- LGA(s): Southern Midlands, Derwent Valley
- Region: Central, South-east
- State electorate(s): Lyons
- Federal division(s): Lyons
Localities around Broadmarsh:
Elderslie	Elderslie	Dysart
Gretna, Black Hills	Broadmarsh	Bagdad, Mangalore
Black Hills	Dromedary	Brighton

Broadmarsh is a rural locality and town in the local government areas of Southern Midlands and Derwent Valley in the Central and South-east regions of Tasmania. It is located about 23 kilometres (14 mi) north-east of the town of New Norfolk. The 2016 census determined a population of 167 for the state suburb of Broadmarsh.

== History ==
Broadmarsh was gazetted as a locality in 1970. The name was used for a farm in the area in 1836.

== Geography ==
The Jordan River flows through from north to south-east.

== Road infrastructure ==
The C185 route (Elderslie Road) enters from the north and runs through via the town to the south-east, where it exits. Route C186 (Black Brush Road) starts at an intersection with C185 and runs north-east until it exits.
