= Bridgewater High School (Tasmania) =

School in Tasmania, Australia

Location
- Municipality of Brighton, Hobart, Tasmania; Australia; 42°44′17″S 147°14′25″E

Information
- Type: Government comprehensive secondary school
- Status: Closed
- Closed: 23 October 2007
- School district: Southern
- Educational authority: Department for Education, Children and Young People
- Oversight: Office of Tasmanian Assessment, Standards & Certification
- Years: 7–10
- Gender: Co-educational
- Campus type: Suburban

Bridgewater High School was a government co-educational comprehensive secondary school located in Bridgewater, a suburb of Hobart, Tasmania, Australia.

== Fire, relocation, and subsequent closure ==
Buildings at the school were involved in a fire on 23 October 2007 causing extensive damage valued at A$5 million. Lessons at the site were abandoned and students were initially accommodated at Geilston Bay High School and Claremont College. From the beginning of the 2008 school year, students were taught in temporary arrangements at the adjacent Bridgewater Primary School. Bridgewater Primary students were temporarily accommodated at Green Point Primary School.

All buildings at Bridgewater High were demolished and a new combined middle school, senior college and vocational education facility was constructed on the original site. The new facility is named Jordan River Learning Federation and includes management oversight of Gagebrook, Herdsmens Cove and East Derwent Primary Schools and a Child and Family Centre.

== See also ==
- List of schools in Tasmania
- Education in Tasmania
