= Old Beach, Tasmania =

Old Beach Hobart, Tasmania
- Coordinates: 42°46′29″S 147°16′9″E
- Population: 3,779 (2016 census)
- Established: early 1800s
- Postcode(s): 7017
- Location: 17 km (11 mi) N of Hobart; 10 km (6 mi) S of Brighton
- LGA(s): Brighton
- Region: Hobart
- State electorate(s): Lyons
- Federal division(s): Lyons
Suburbs around Old Beach:
Herdsmans Cove	Gagebrook, Honeywood	Tea Tree
River Derwent	Old Beach	Richmond
River Derwent	Otago	Risdon

Old Beach is a residential / rural locality in the local government area (LGA) of Brighton in the Hobart LGA region of Tasmania. The locality is about 10 kilometres (6.2 mi) south of the town of Brighton. The 2016 census recorded a population of 3779 for the state suburb of Old Beach.

It is approximately 7 km from the Baskerville Raceway. Old Beach is surrounded by an abundance of green mountainous terrain. At the heart of Old Beach is an old mining quarry, active in the late 1980s for the mining of sandstone, and providing an economic boost for the area.

== History ==
Old Beach was gazetted as a locality in 1970. Old Beach Post Office opened on 11 January 1866 and closed in 1975.

== Geography ==
The River Derwent forms the western and south-western boundaries.

== Road infrastructure ==
Route B32 (East Derwent Highway) runs through from west to south.

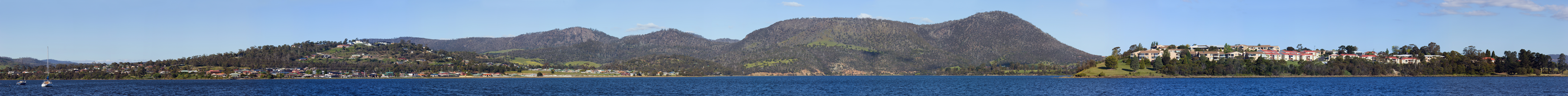
Old Beach (left) and the Meehan Range, including Mount Direction and Gunners Quoin
