= Lindisfarne Interchange =

Interchange in Tasmania, Australia

Coordinates: 42°51′42.70″S 147°21′17.02″E

The Lindisfarne Interchange is a Directional T interchange which connects the Tasman Bridge to the Tasman Highway and the East Derwent Highway, on the eastern shore of the River Derwent within Hobart, Tasmania, Australia. The Interchange was constructed in 1960 in conjunction with the Tasman Bridge and opened on 23 December 1964.

The interchange experiences regular congestion, handling in excess of 67,000 traffic movements per day in 2007.
