= Otago, Tasmania =

Otago Hobart, Tasmania
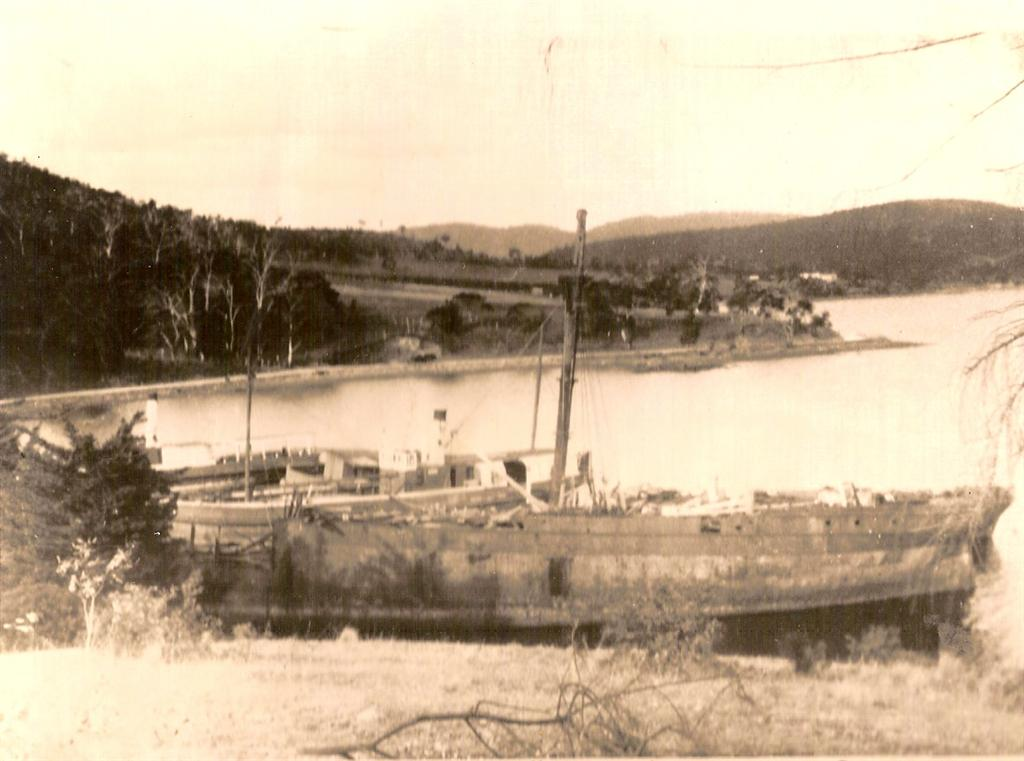
- Otago Bay and hulks including Otago in the early 1950s

- Coordinates: 42°48′3″S 147°17′28″E
- Population: 554 (2016 census)
- Postcode(s): 7017
- Location: 15 km (9 mi) S of Brighton
- LGA(s): Clarence, Brighton
- Region: Hobart
- State electorate(s): Lyons, Franklin
- Federal division(s): Lyons, Franklin
Suburbs around Otago:
Old Beach	Old Beach	Risdon
River Derwent	Otago	Risdon
River Derwent	River Derwent	Risdon

Otago is a rural residential locality in the local government areas (LGA) of Brighton and Clarence in the Hobart LGA region of Tasmania. The locality is about 15 kilometres (9.3 mi) south of the town of Brighton. The 2016 census recorded a population of 554 for the state suburb of Otago. It is a suburb of Hobart, located on the shores of Otago Bay.

== History ==
Otago was gazetted as a locality in 1977. Previously gazetted as Gregson, after Thomas Gregson, the second Premier of Tasmania, the name was changed in 1977.

The area takes its name from the iron barque Otago, the only command of the author Joseph Conrad, which was dismantled at a shipbreaking establishment that operated at the bay (formerly known simply as part of Old Beach) between the 1920s and 1960s. The remains of Otago (beached there in 1931) and a steel river steamer Westralian (beached in 1937) can still be seen on the beach. The name of the boat was in turn taken from the Otago region of New Zealand.

== Geography ==
The waters of the River Derwent form the western and southern boundaries.

== Road infrastructure ==
Route B32 (East Derwent Highway) passes through from north-west to south-east.
