= Granton, Tasmania =

Granton
- Suburb
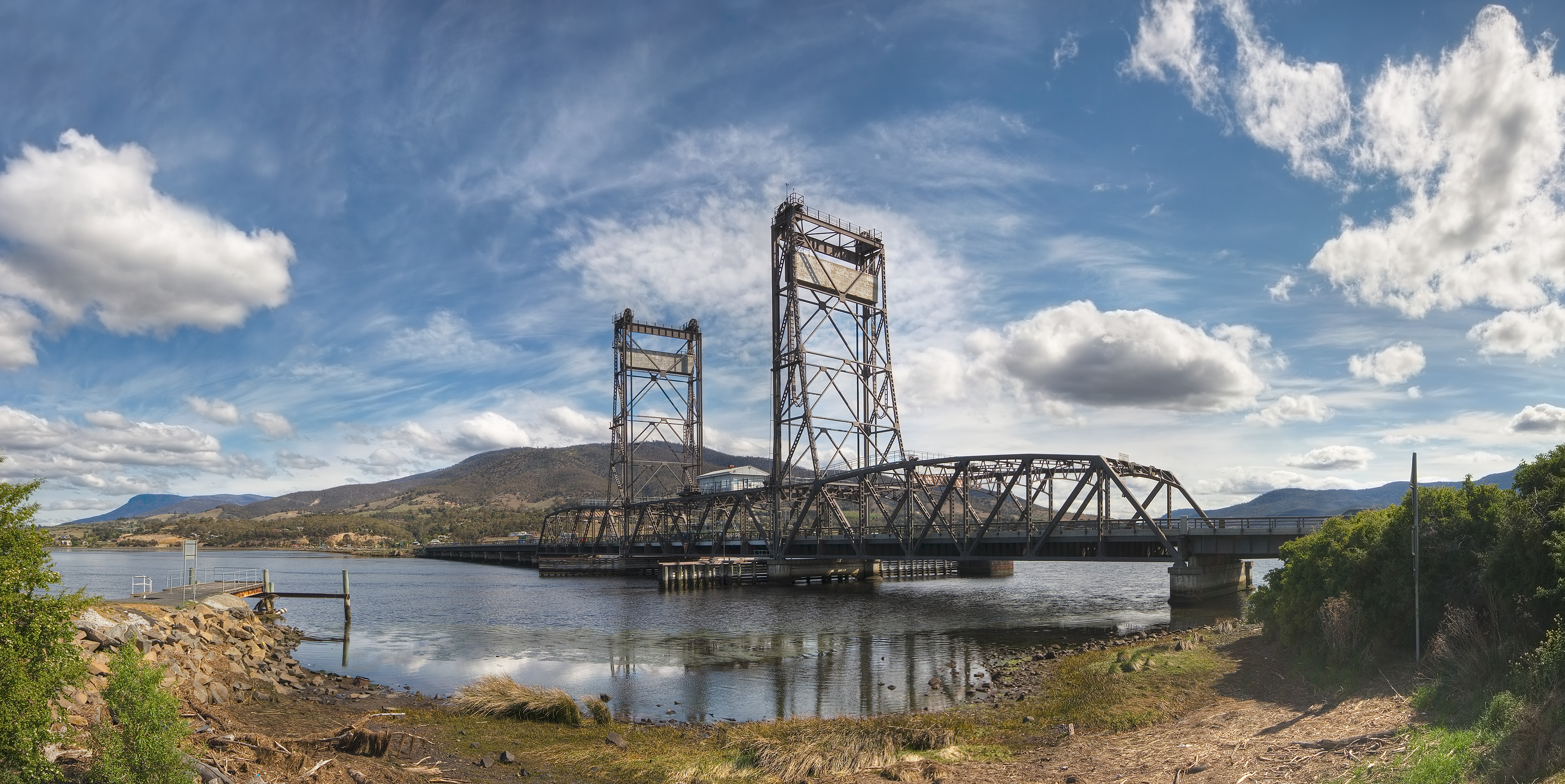
- Bridgewater Causeway and Bridgewater Bridge with Granton and Mt Wellington behind.

- Interactive map of Granton
- Coordinates: 42°45′6″S 147°13′41″E
- Country: Australia
- State: Tasmania
- Region: South-east, Hobart
- City: City of Glenorchy
- LGA: Derwent Valley Council (80%), City of Glenorchy (20%)
- Location: 9 km (5.6 mi) N of Glenorchy

Government
  - State electorates: Clark; Lyons
  - Federal divisions: Clark; Lyons

Population
  - Total: 1,736 (2016 census)
- Postcode: 7030
Suburbs around Granton
Dromedary, Boyer	Dromedary, Bridgewater	Bridgewater
Sorell Creek	Granton	Bridgewater, Old Beach
Molesworth	Claremont, Molesworth	Austins Ferry

Granton is a rural residential locality in the local government areas (LGA) of Derwent Valley (80%) and Glenorchy (20%) in the South-east and Hobart LGA regions of Tasmania. The locality is about 9 kilometres (5.6 mi) north of the town of Glenorchy. The 2016 census recorded a population of 1736 for the state suburb of Granton. It is a suburb of Hobart. Rust Road is the approximate boundary between the two municipalities at Granton.

Public facilities including the Granton War Memorial Hall, public toilets and Granton Green Reserve are located within the Derwent Valley Council section.

== History ==
Granton was gazetted as a locality in 1970.

The locality was originally known as South Bridgewater, and is home to the Granton Convict Site, which consists of the Old Watch House (1838) and the quarry from which stone was extracted for the construction of the Bridgewater Causeway.

== Geography ==
The waters of the River Derwent form the northern boundary.

== Road infrastructure ==
Route A10 (Lyell Highway) runs through from east to west.
