= Greenpoint =

Greenpoint may refer to:

== Geography ==
- Greenpoint, Brooklyn, United States
- Greenspoint, Houston, United States
- Greenpoint Avenue
- Greenpoint Avenue Bridge
- Greenpoint Avenue station

== Other ==
- Greenpoint (climbing), a technique in rock climbing

== See also ==
- Green Point (disambiguation)
