= Otago (barque) =

1869 three-masted iron merchant ship

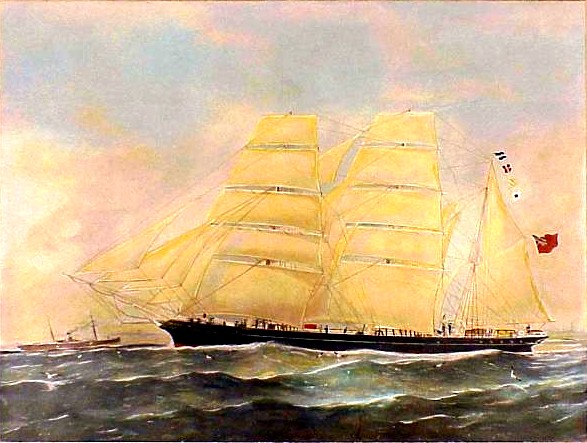
- This painting, presumed to be the barque Otago, was a cover image for Joseph Conrad's "The Mirror of the Sea".

History

United Kingdom
- Name: Otago
- Namesake: Otago, New Zealand
- Builder: Alexander Stephen & Sons, Glasgow
- Launched: 1869
- Home port: Adelaide
- Identification: UK Official Number: 63557
- Fate: Scrapped near Hobart in Otago bay

General characteristics
- Class & type: Barque
- Tonnage: 367 GRT; 365 NRT
- Length: 147 ft (45 m)
- Beam: 26 ft (7.9 m)
- Depth: 14 ft (4.3 m)
- Decks: 2
- Sail plan: Three-masted barque

Otago was a three-masted iron merchant ship of 367 gross register tons (GRT). The Otago was built in Glasgow, launched in 1869, and sailed initially to New Zealand in 1871. The ship was sold to Adelaide businessmen in December 1871 and then remained in Australian management and was scrapped near Hobart.

The Otago was notable as the only command of the novelist Joseph Conrad. He took command of her in Singapore when 30 years old, following the death of its previous captain. He commanded from 1888 – March 1889. The Otago and his experiences are described in his novel The Shadow-Line.

After use as a merchant ship the Otago was hulked in 1902, and arrived in Hobart in 1905 for use as a coal hulk by Huddart Parker & Co., who sold the vessel in 1931 for scrap. The vessel's Hobart register was finally closed in 1951. Part of the hulk is still visible along the River Derwent in Otago Bay.

There are other ships named Otago that may be confused with this small barque, notably the larger 1,048 GRT full-rigged clipper Otago, also built in 1869, but as an emigrant ship by Robert Duncan and Company.
