= Boyer, Tasmania =

Boyer
- Town
- Coordinates: 42°46′27″S 147°06′16″E
- Country: Australia
- State: Tasmania
- Region: Hobart, South-east
- LGA: Derwent Valley, Brighton
- Location: 33 km (21 mi) NW of Hobart; 5 km (3.1 mi) E of New Norfolk; 18 km (11 mi) SW of Brighton

Government
  - State electorate: Lyons
  - Federal division: Lyons

Population
  - Total: 40 (2016 census)
- Postcode: 7140
Localities around Boyer
Magra, New Norfolk	Magra	Dromedary
New Norfolk	Boyer	Dromedary
New Norfolk	Sorell Creek	Sorell Creek, Granton

Boyer is a rural locality in the local government areas (LGA) of Brighton and Derwent Valley in the Hobart and South-east LGA regions of Tasmania. The locality is about 18 kilometres (11 mi) south-west of the town of Brighton. The 2016 census recorded a population of 40 for the state suburb of Boyer. It is a town on the eastern side of the River Derwent, opposite and slightly downstream of New Norfolk.

== History ==
Boyer was gazetted as a locality in 1970. It is named after a family who first settled in the area in the early 19th century.

Specialising in newsprint and magazine-grade paper, the Boyer Mill was established by Australian Newsprint Mills in 1941.

It was the first pulp and paper mill in the world to utilise hardwood to produce newsprint, and has been recognised by Engineering Heritage Tasmania as a national engineering landmark. For many decades paper was shipped by tug and barge from the plant to the port of Hobart, Tasmania but all freight is now sent by road or rail.

== Geography ==
The River Derwent forms the southern boundary.

== Road infrastructure ==
Route B10 (Boyer Road) passes through from east to west.
