= Tea Tree, Tasmania =

Town in Australia

Tea Tree Tasmania
- Coordinates: 42°40′55″S 147°21′06″E
- Population: 413 (2016 census)
- Postcode(s): 7017
- Location: 10 km (6 mi) NE of Brighton
- LGA(s): Southern Midlands, Brighton
- Region: Central, Hobart
- State electorate(s): Lyons
- Federal division(s): Lyons
Localities around Tea Tree:
Campania	Campania	Campania
Brighton, Pontville, Mangalore	Tea Tree	Campania, Richmond
Honeywood	Richmond	Richmond

Tea Tree is a rural locality and town in the local government areas of Southern Midlands and Brighton in the Central and Hobart regions of Tasmania. It is located about 10 kilometres (6.2 mi) north-east of the town of Brighton. The 2016 census determined a population of 413 for the state suburb of Tea Tree.

== History ==
Robert Cosgrove, the longest-serving premier of Tasmania, was born at Tea Tree in 1884. He served two terms as premier, 1939–47 and 1948–58, as leader of the Australian Labor Party.

Tea Tree was gazetted as a locality in 1970.

== Geography ==
Most boundaries of the locality are survey lines. The Main rail line passes through via the town from west to east.

== Road infrastructure ==
The C321 route (Tea Tree Road) enters from the west and runs through via the town to the north-east, where it exits. Route C322 (Middle Tea Tree Road) starts at an intersection with C321 and runs south-east until it exits. Route C323 (Back Tea Tree Road) starts at an intersection with C321 on the western boundary and runs south-east through the locality until it exits.
