= Brighton Council (Tasmania) =

- Local government area
- Coordinates: 42.7195°S 147.2602°E
- Country: Australia
- State: Tasmania
- Region: Brighton/Bridgewater
- Established: 1 January 1863
- Council seat: Brighton

Government
  - Mayor: Leigh Gray
  - State electorate(s): Lyons
  - Federal division(s): Lyons

Area
  - Total: 171 km^{2} (66 sq mi)
- Website: Brighton Council
LGAs around Brighton Council
Southern Midlands	Southern Midlands	Southern Midlands
Derwent Valley	Brighton Council	Clarence
Derwent Valley	Glenorchy	Clarence

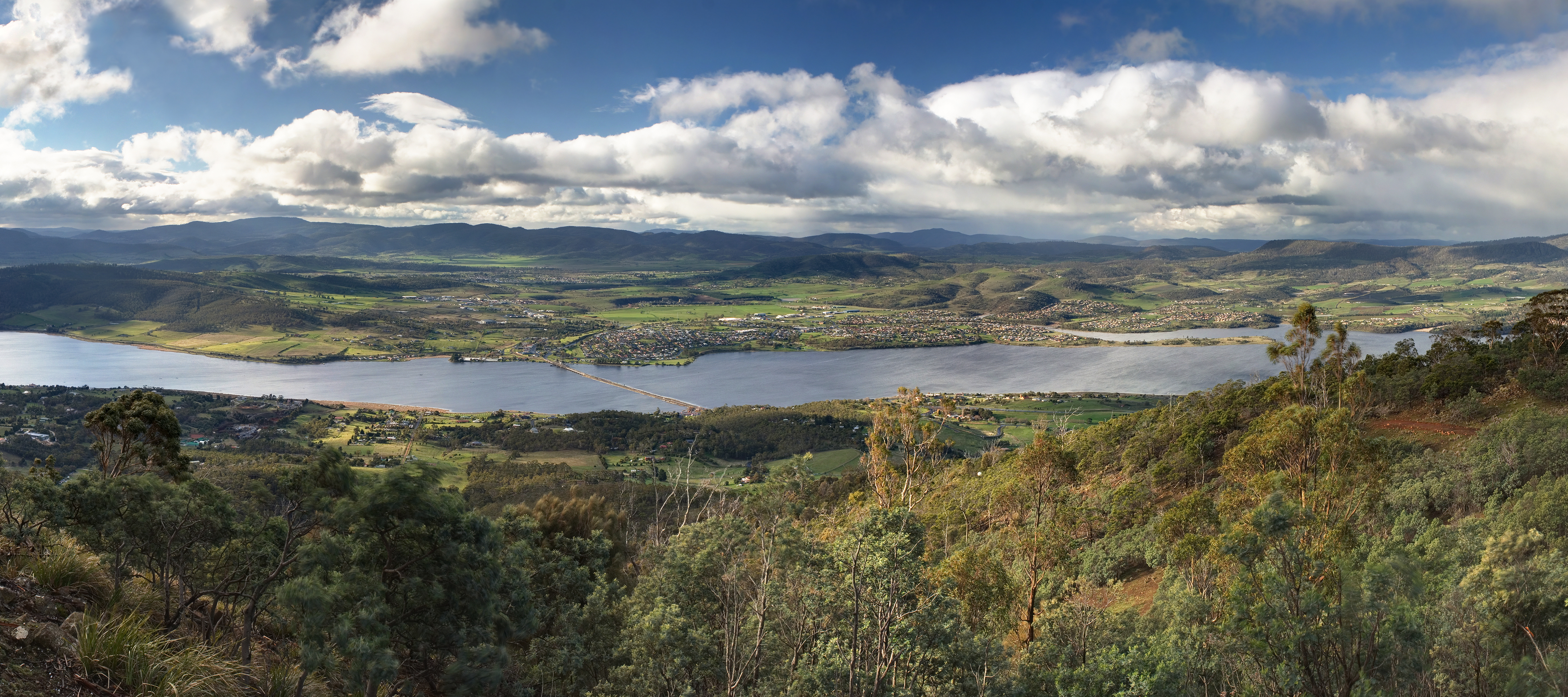
Brighton viewed over the Derwent and former Bridgewater Bridge from Granton

Brighton Council is a local government body in Tasmania, situated in the south-east of the state, north of Hobart. The Brighton local government area is classified as urban and has a population of 18,995, it is based in the town of Brighton but also covers the far northern Hobart suburbs of Bridgewater, Gagebrook, Honeywood and Old Beach.

== History and attributes ==
The municipality was established on 1 January 1863. Its boundaries were substantially altered during a later reorganisation and a portion of the municipality became part of the Southern Midlands.

Brighton is classified as urban, regional and small (URS) under the Australian Classification of Local Governments.

== Council ==
=== Current composition ===
Name	Position	Party affiliation
Leigh Gray	Mayor/Councillor	Independent Liberal
Barbara Curran	Deputy Mayor/Councillor	Independent
Aaron De La Torre	Councillor	Independent Labor
Peter Geard	Councillor	Independent
Greg Irons	Councillor	Independent
John McMaster	Councillor	Independent
Tennille Murtagh	Councillor	Independent One Nation
Phillip Owen	Councillor	Independent
Michael Whelan	Councillor	Independent

=== 2022 election results ===
2022 Tasmanian local elections: Brighton
Party	Candidate	Votes	%	±%
Independent Liberal	Leigh Gray (elected)	3,053	29.41	
Independent	Barbara Curran (elected)	1,561	15.04	
Independent	Phil Owen (elected)	1,471	14.17	
Independent	Greg Irons (elected)	885	8.53	
Independent One Nation	Tennille Murtagh (elected)	864	8.32	
Independent Labor	Aaron De La Torre (elected)	701	6.75	
Independent	Michael Whelan (elected)	458	4.41	
Independent	Peter Geard (elected)	380	3.66	
Independent	Kellyanne Williams	363	3.50	
Independent	John McMaster (elected)	330	3.18	
Greens	Jack Cavanagh	315	3.03	
Total formal votes		10,381	96.86	
Informal votes		336	3.14	
Turnout		10,717	78.41	

== Suburbs ==
Suburb	Census Population 2021	Reason
Brighton	4,983	
Bridgewater	4,592	Includes Green Point
Green Point		Inc. in Bridgewater
Gagebrook	1,572	
Honeywood	535	
Herdsmans Cove	1,199	
Millvale		Incl. in Dromedary
Dromedary	856	Includes Millvale
Old Beach	4,394	
Tea Tree	464	Part
Pontville	675	Part
Total	19,585	
	590	Variance
Local government total	18,995	Gazetted Brighton Government Area

=== Not in above List ===
- Boyer
- Magra
- Otago

== See also ==
- Local government areas of Tasmania
