= Bowen Bridge =

Bridge crossing the River Derwent in Tasmania, Australia

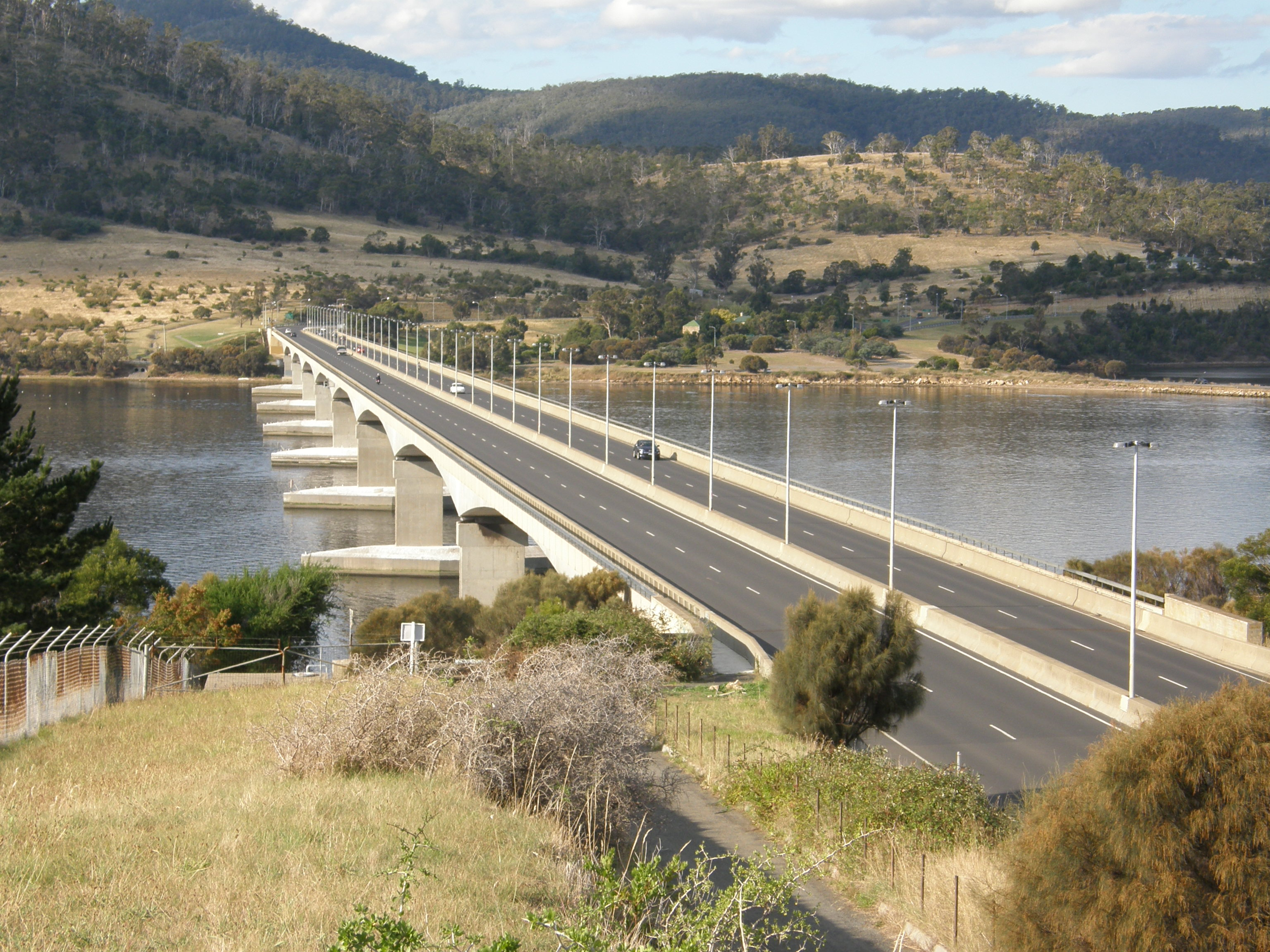
- The Bowen Bridge from the western shore
- Coordinates: 42°49′07″S 147°18′21″E
- Carries: Goodwood Road
- Crosses: River Derwent
- Locale: Hobart, Tasmania
- Named for: John Bowen
- Owner: Building Tasmania
- Preceded by: Bridgewater Bridge
- Followed by: Tasman Bridge

Characteristics
- Design: Segmental cantilever
- Total length: 976 metres (3,202 ft)
- Width: 21.4 metres (70 ft)
- Longest span: 109 metres (358 ft)
- No. of spans: 10
- Clearance below: 17.3 metres (57 ft)

History
- Constructed by: Leighton Contractors-Candac
- Opened: 23 February 1984

Location
- Interactive map of Bowen Bridge

The Bowen Bridge is a segmental cantilever road bridge crossing the River Derwent in Tasmania, Australia. The bridge serves as a vital transportation link in the state capital of Hobart, facilitating the movement of vehicles, pedestrians, and cyclists between the local government areas of Clarence on the eastern shore and Glenorchy on the western shore. The Bowen Bridge links the East Derwent Highway with the Brooker Highway (as Goodwood Road) at Glenorchy, approximately 10 kilometres (6.2 mi) from the Hobart central business district.

The Bowen Bridge is composed of eight river spans, each measuring 109 metres (358 ft). The end spans are 48 metres (157 ft) and 56 metres (184 ft) long. It maintains a consistent deck width of 21.4 metres (70 ft), accommodating a 7.42-metre (24.3 ft) divided highway with two lanes each, along with a separated shared-use walkway on the north side.

The Bowen Bridge takes its name from British colonist John Bowen, who founded the first European settlement in Van Diemen's Land at Risdon Cove on the eastern shore. Bowen subsequently moved the colony to the western side of the River Derwent, where the Hobart City Centre is located today. Prime Minister Malcolm Fraser revealed the bridge's name at a public ceremony at Dowsings Point on 10 October 1980.

== History ==
Situated approximately halfway between the Tasman Bridge and the Bridgewater Bridge, the Bowen Bridge was constructed to mitigate any future failure of the city's bridges following the Tasman Bridge disaster. The State and Federal governments established the Joint Committee in November 1975 to oversee the design and construction of a bridge across the River Derwent near Dowsings Point. Maunsell & Partners served as consulting engineers and Leighton Contractors-Candac, awarded the contract in 1980, completed the construction.

=== Design ===
The foundational design primarily aimed to ensure the river piers could withstand impacts from barges traveling at operating speeds (6 knots (11 km/h; 6.9 mph)) assisted by the current (1 knot (1.9 km/h; 1.2 mph)). All piers were specifically engineered to endure an impact force of 1,600 tonnes (1,600 long tons; 1,800 short tons) at an angle of up to 45 degrees from the pile cap centre line, while other directions could sustain a force of 1,000 tonnes (980 long tons; 1,100 short tons). This approach accounted for potential impact from future river barges of up to 5,000 tonnes (4,900 long tons; 5,500 short tons) of deadweight tonnage. The underlying philosophy involved creating substantial gravity-based foundation structures capable of generating adequate force to absorb the energy and deform the bows of barges during impact.

The design strategy also allowed for future reinforcement to withstand a force of 2,900 tonnes (2,900 long tons; 3,200 short tons), accommodating potential deadweight tonnage impact of 10,000 tonnes (9,800 long tons; 11,000 short tons). To meet these ship impact criteria, the river pier foundations were constructed as massive reinforced concrete caisson structures, measuring 13.3 metres (44 ft) in outer diameter with 1.2 metres (3 ft 11 in) wall thickness, built from the ground up.

The deepest among the nine piers extended to 48 metres (157 ft) below mean sea level. Noteworthy statistics include a total concrete mass of 105,000 tonnes (103,000 long tons; 116,000 short tons), a reinforcing steel mass of 3,300 tonnes (3,200 long tons; 3,600 short tons), and a cumulative length of steel tendons reaching 760 kilometres (470 mi).

=== Construction ===
Leighton Contractors implemented a highly efficient balanced cantilever construction technique, notably avoiding the use of falsework within the river – a pioneering approach in Australia at that time. To streamline the construction process, segments were match cast, enabling the deck to be constructed concurrently with the establishment of substantial foundations. This segmental design facilitated swift assembly of the superstructure. The superstructure itself consists of two individual box girders that were erected side by side and connected by an in situ longitudinal joint. The segments were cast in the sequence of their installation. Subsequent segments were directly cast against preceding adjacent segments, utilising a debonding agent on the adjacent surface to allow for separation.

The bridge cost $49 million to construct and was officially opened on 23 February 1984 by Prime Minister Bob Hawke.

== Sources ==
- Brown, Damien (director) (1984). Bowen Bridge (YouTube). Joint Committee of Second Hobart Bridge.
- Bowen Bridge - Second Hobart Bridge
- Leslie, JA; Allen, JB (1983), "Design of the Bowen Bridge, Hobart", Engineering Conference Newcastle: Engineering Towards the 21st Century; Conference Papers, Institution of Engineers, Australia, pp. 163–170, ISBN 978-0-85825-182-3
- Lickiss, KG (1983), "Planning the Bowen Bridge, Hobart", Engineering Conference Newcastle: Engineering Towards the 21st Century; Conference Papers, Institution of Engineers, Australia, pp. 156–162, ISBN 978-0-85825-182-3
- Joint Committee on Second Hobart Bridge (1987), "1 online resource (21 pages) : colour illustrations, plans.", Second Hobart Bridge (Bowen Bridge) Joint Committee report on construction, [Hobart: Joint Committee on Second Hobart Bridge, Tasmania, nla.obj-1382242661
- Bott, G. J; Bennett, M. V (1983), Inspection of Tasmanian bridges including the Bowen Bridge, Hobart 9th to 12th November, 1982, s.n.]
