= Pontville, Tasmania =

Pontville
- Town
- Coordinates: 42°41′4″S 147°15′59″E
- Country: Australia
- State: Tasmania
- Region: Hobart, Central
- LGA: Brighton, Southern Midlands
- Location: 28 km (17 mi) N of Hobart; 4 km (2.5 mi) NW of Brighton

Government
  - State electorate: Lyons
  - Federal division: Lyons

Population
  - Total: 623 (2016 census)
- Postcode: 7030
Localities around Pontville
Mangalore	Mangalore	Tea Tree
Brighton	Pontville	Brighton, Tea Tree
Brighton	Brighton	Brighton

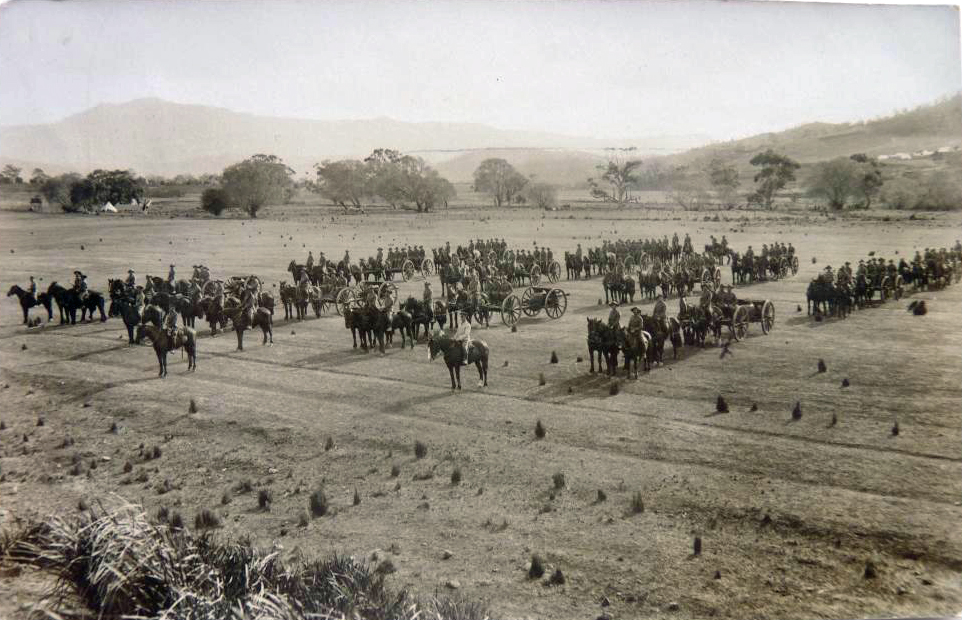
Pontville Brighton Australian army camp in Tasmania - WW1

Pontville is a rural locality in the local government areas (LGA) of Brighton and Southern Midlands in the Hobart and Central LGA regions of Tasmania. The locality is about 4 kilometres (2.5 mi) north-west of the town of Brighton. The 2016 census recorded a population of 623 for the state suburb of Pontville.

It is a small rural community 28 kilometres (17 mi) north of Hobart, in the south-east of Tasmania.

== History ==
Pontville was sited by Governor Lachlan Macquarie in 1821, and was an early garrison town, where convicts built the bridge over the Jordan River. During World Wars I and II the area had a major army camp.

There is an old sandstone bridge in Pontville that lies on the Jordan River. The bridge is part of the Midland Highway.

A railway line connected the town with Hobart from 1891 until 1947. Additional excursion trains operated from Hobart, bringing riflemen to the nearby range. Pontville was gazetted as a locality in 1970.

Brighton Post Office opened on 1 June 1832, was renamed Pontville in 1895, and closed in 1973.

== Historic buildings ==
Epsom House is an historic building originally built as a coaching inn, The Blacksmith's Arms, around 1831, by retired sergeant James Bunyip. In the 20th century, it was run by the Johnson family as the Epsom Store. It was restored in the 21st century as an entertainment venue, with the ballroom hosting the Australian String Quartet in 2006 in what may have been the first public performance there in 100 years. As of 2022, it is one of the regular venues of the Seraphim Trio.

== Geography ==
The Jordan River flows through from south-west to south.

== Road infrastructure ==
The Midland Highway (National Route 1) passes through from south to north-west. Route C195 (Brighton Road) starts at an intersection with Route 1 and runs south until it exits.

== Immigration detention centre ==
The Federal Government announced in April 2011 that it would spend $15 million on converting the army rifle range to an asylum-seeker detention centre, housing 400 people, mainly single adult men, although the Pontville Immigration Detention Centre was also used to house under-age males. In February 2012 it was announced by the Department of Immigration and Citizenship that the centre would be closed, which it did in September 2013.
