= Gagebrook =

- Suburb
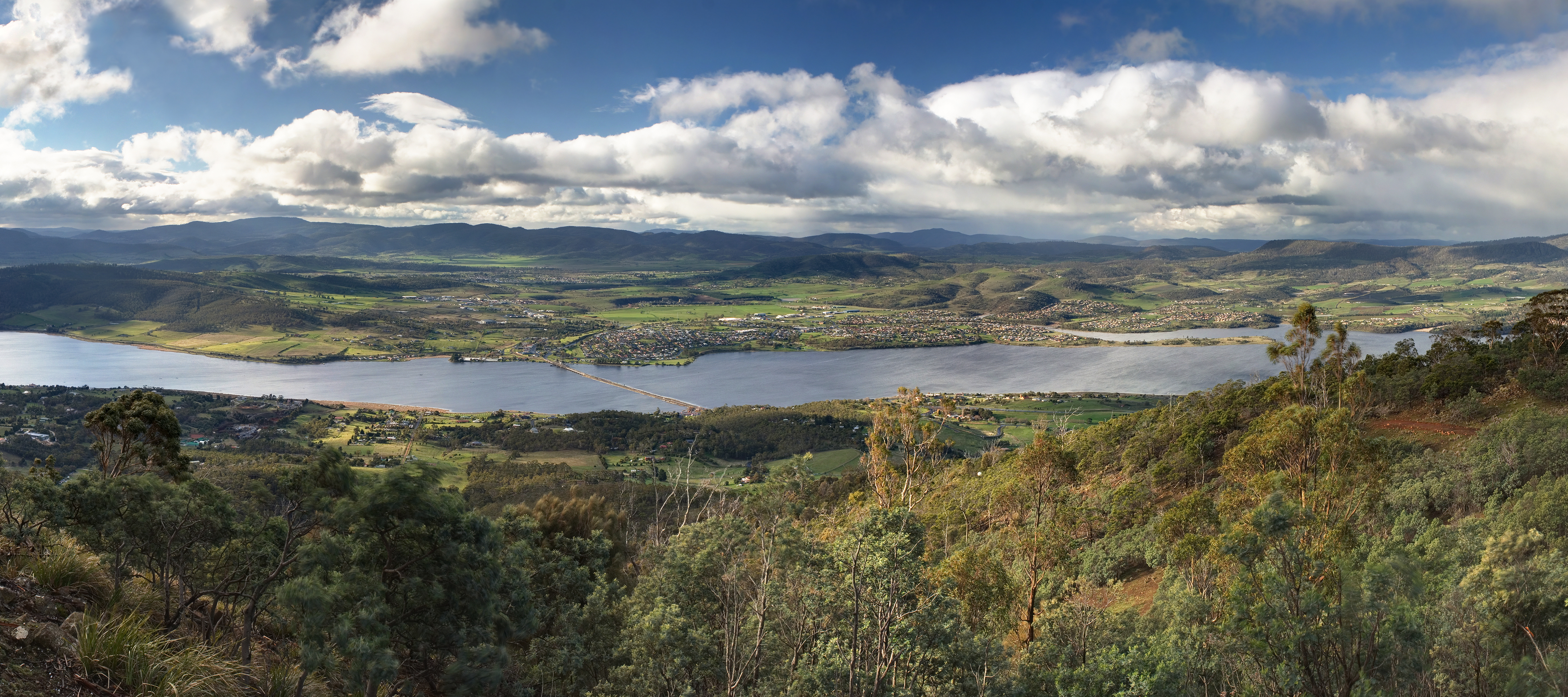
- Bridgewater (left) and Gagebrook (right)

- Interactive map of Gagebrook
- Coordinates: 42°44′40″S 147°16′01″E
- Country: Australia
- State: Tasmania
- Region: Hobart
- City: Hobart
- LGA: Brighton
- Location: 9 km (5.6 mi) S of Brighton

Government
  - State electorate: Lyons
  - Federal division: Lyons

Population
  - Total: 1,440 (2016 census)
- Postcode: 7030
Suburbs around Gagebrook
Bridgewater	Honeywood	Honeywood
Bridgewater	Gagebrook	Old Beach
Bridgewater	Herdsmans Cove, Old Beach	Old Beach

Gagebrook is a residential locality in the local government area (LGA) of Brighton in the Hobart LGA region of Tasmania, Australia. The locality is about 9 kilometres (5.6 mi) south of the town of Brighton. The 2016 census recorded a population of 1440 for the state suburb of Gagebrook. It is one of the northernmost suburbs of Hobart, located near the eastern shore of the River Derwent between the suburbs of Bridgewater and Old Beach.

== History ==
Gagebrook was gazetted as a locality in 1977. The suburb, like its adjacent suburb of Bridgewater (also built up of mass-public housing in the 1970s) has a reputation as a lower socio-economic area. Like the rest of Hobart's public housing suburbs, many public housing stock have been sold privately.

Gagebrook has two primary schools: Herdman's Cove Primary School and Gagebrook Primary School (both public).

== Geography ==
The Jordan River forms the western and north-western boundaries.

== Road infrastructure ==
Route B32 (East Derwent Highway) passes to the south. From there, Gage Road and Tottenham Road provide access to the locality.
