= Midlands (Tasmania) =

- Region
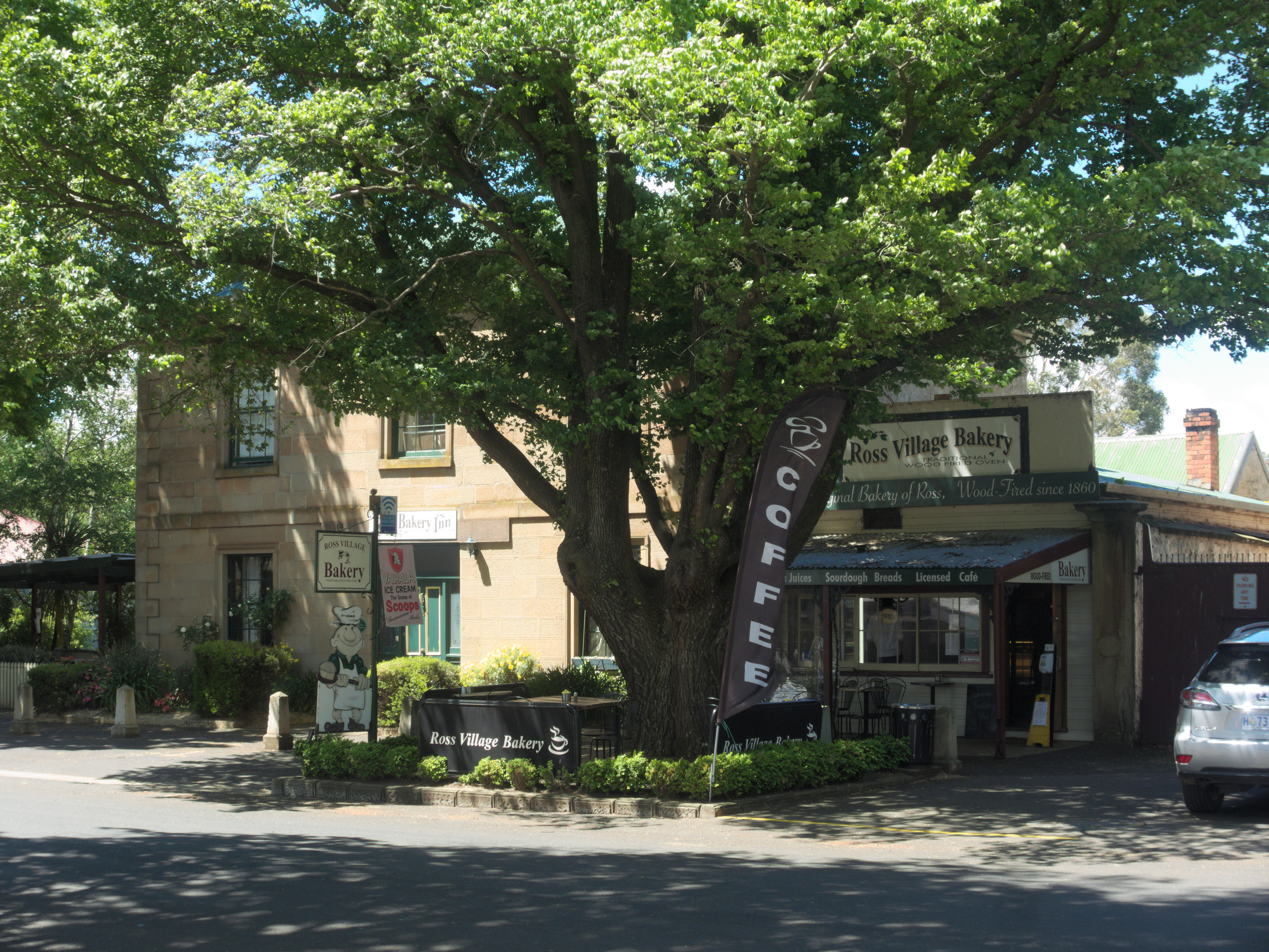
- The bakery at Ross, a town near the centre of the Midlands.
- Country: Australia
- State: Tasmania
- LGAs: Northern Midlands; Southern Midlands

Government
  - State electorate: Lyons
  - Federal division: Lyons

Population
  - Total: 18,865
Regions around Midlands
North West Tasmania	Northern Tasmania	North East Tasmania
Central Highlands	Midlands	East Coast Tasmania
South West Tasmania	Southern Tasmania	East Coast Tasmania

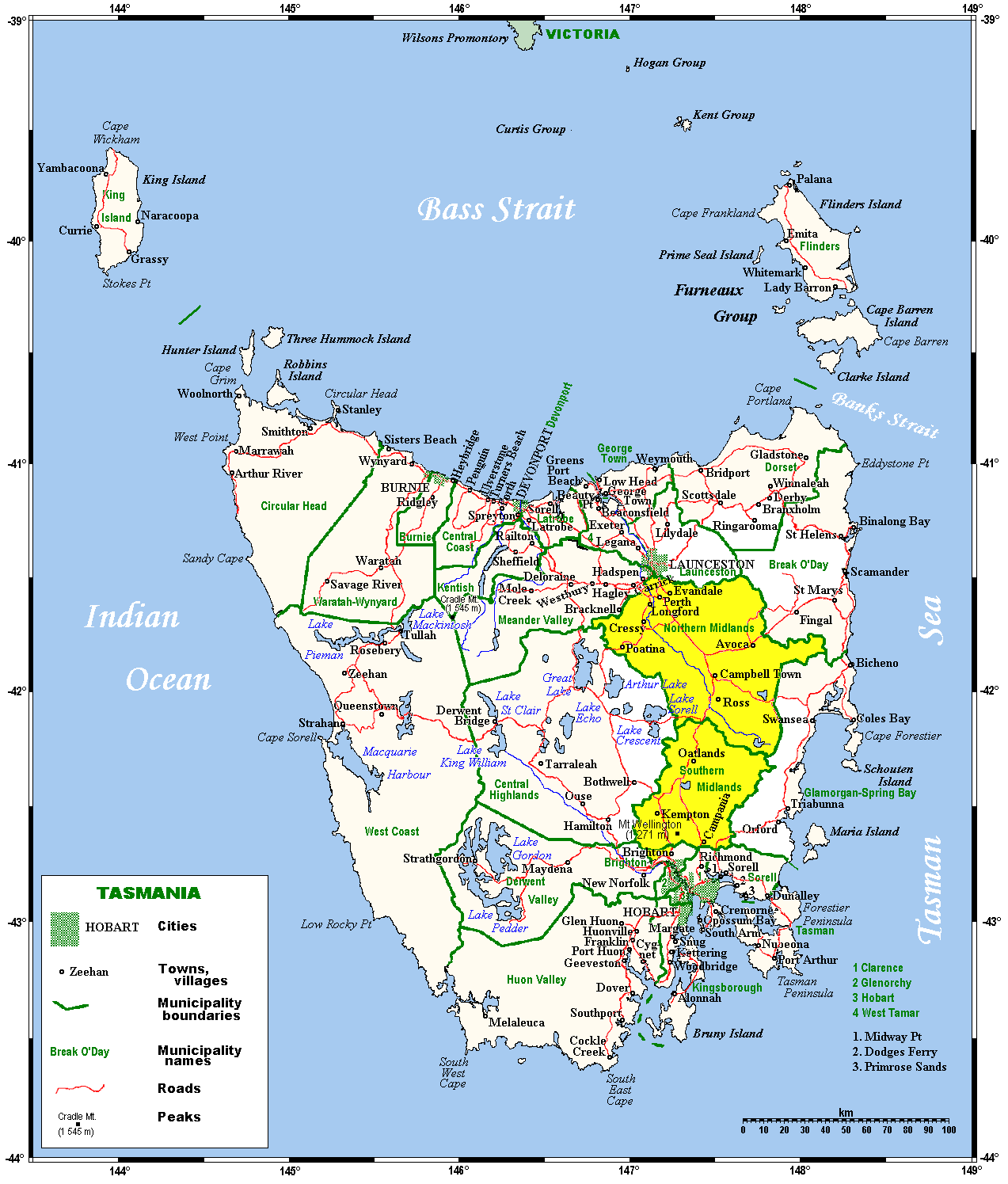
Map of the Midlands region of Tasmania, shaded in yellow.

The Midlands is a region of Tasmania between Launceston and Hobart. It also refers to the relatively flat, dry agricultural area, so named because it covers the region between the two cities. Its name is probably also influenced from the Midlands in the United Kingdom. It lends its name to the Southern Midlands Council, Northern Midlands Council, and the Midland Highway. The region is sometimes conflated or confused with the adjacent region of the Central Highlands—with the added term Tasmania's heartland.

== Geography ==
Most of the Midlands is a region of relatively low plains drained mostly by tributaries of the Tamar River in the north and Jordan River in the south. The natural vegetation was predominantly grassland, but all of it is either grazed by cattle and sheep or cleared for growing better pasture species. On the eastern side it rises into low, unglaciated dolerite hills and mountains, largely covered with dry sclerophyllous forests, but on the west lies the high doleritic Lake Country, which was extensively glaciated during Quaternary glacial periods and is covered with large numbers of lakes consequently carved into the very hard and erosion-resistant rock.

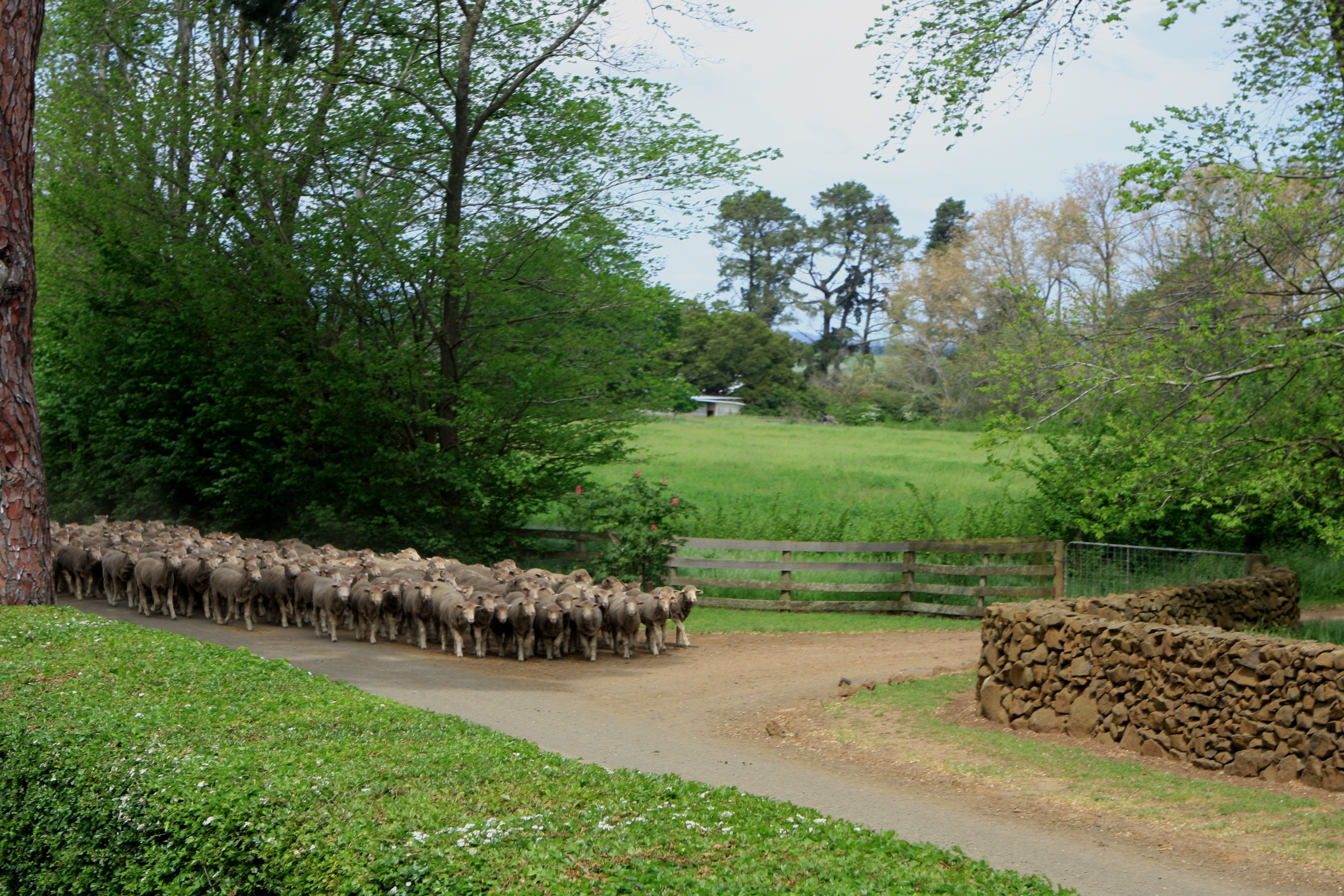
Sheep in Longford, Tasmania

The climate of the Midlands is the driest in Tasmania, with annual rainfalls ranging from 450 to 600 millimetres (18 to 24 in). Rainfall is evenly distributed throughout the year and the region is less prone to very heavy rainfalls than the eastern coast of Tasmania. Because it is not surrounded by sea, the Midlands has both the warmest summers and some of the coldest winters in Tasmania. In summer, maximum temperatures average 24 °C (75 °F), whilst in winter most days have frosts, sometimes severe. The lowest temperature in the region is around −12 °C (10 °F) in 1902, when snow fell in Hobart city.

Owing to the relatively low rainfall and the presence of recently eroded fertile dolerite rocks, the soils are the most fertile in all of Tasmania. Most of them are quite close to the chernozems of Asia and North America, and consequently the Midlands is rich grazing land supporting intensive rearing of sheep. Some grain crops are also grown, though the summers are rather cool for them.

== See also ==
- Regions of Tasmania
- North-west and west coast councils
