= HMNZS Otago =

The name HMNZS Otago may apply to:

- HMNZS Otago (F111), a frigate commissioned 1960–1983
- HMNZS Otago (P148), a patrol boat commissioned in 2007
