= Jordan River (Tasmania) =

River in Tasmania, Australia

Jordan (kuta linah)
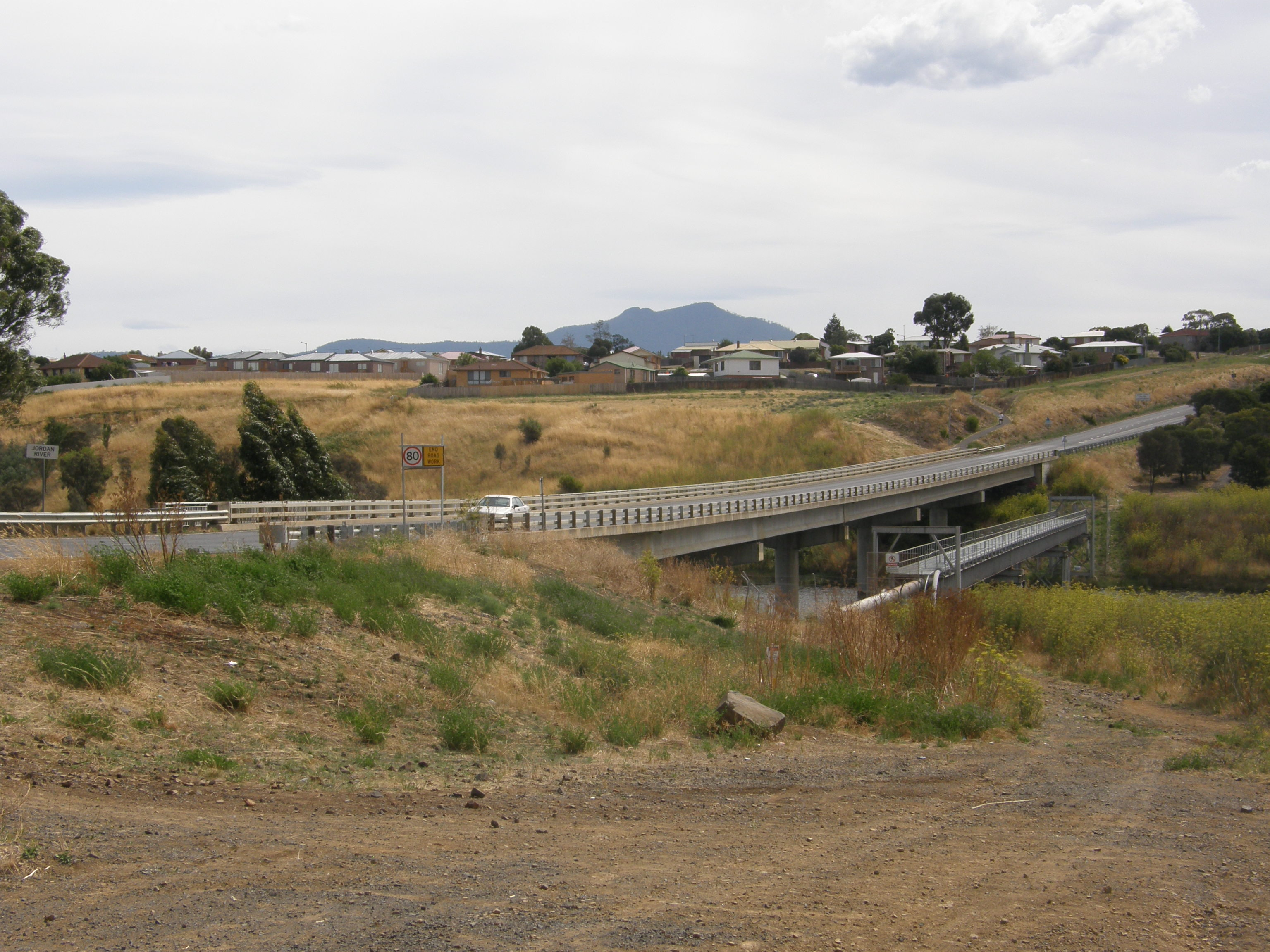
- Jordan River as it flows under the Jordan River Bridge, on the East Derwent Highway

- Location of the Jordan River mouth in Tasmania

Location
- Country: Australia
- State: Tasmania
- Region: Midlands
- Settlements: Pontville, Brighton

Physical characteristics
- Source: Lake Tiberias, Tasmania
  - location: below Mount Anstey
  - coordinates: 42°24′52″S 147°20′2″E
  - elevation: 382 m (1,253 ft)
- Mouth: River Derwent
  - location: near Gagebrook
  - coordinates: 42°45′44″S 147°15′32″E
  - elevation: 0 m (0 ft)
- Length: 111 km (69 mi)

Basin features
- River system: River Derwent catchment

The Jordan River (Aboriginal: kuta linah) is a perennial river in the Midlands region of Tasmania, Australia.

== Course and features ==
The Jordan River rises in Lake Tiberias below Mount Anstey, south of the settlement of Jericho, near Oatlands. The river flows generally north, then west by south, joined by eight minor tributaries and passes by Brighton before reaching its mouth at Herdsman's Cove and emptying into the River Derwent near Gagebrook. The river descends 382 metres (1,253 ft) over its 111-kilometre (69 mi) course.

The river is associated with Aboriginal heritage.

The (B32) East Derwent Highway crosses the river.

== See also ==
- Rivers of Tasmania
