= Bridgewater, Tasmania =

Bridgewater
- Suburb
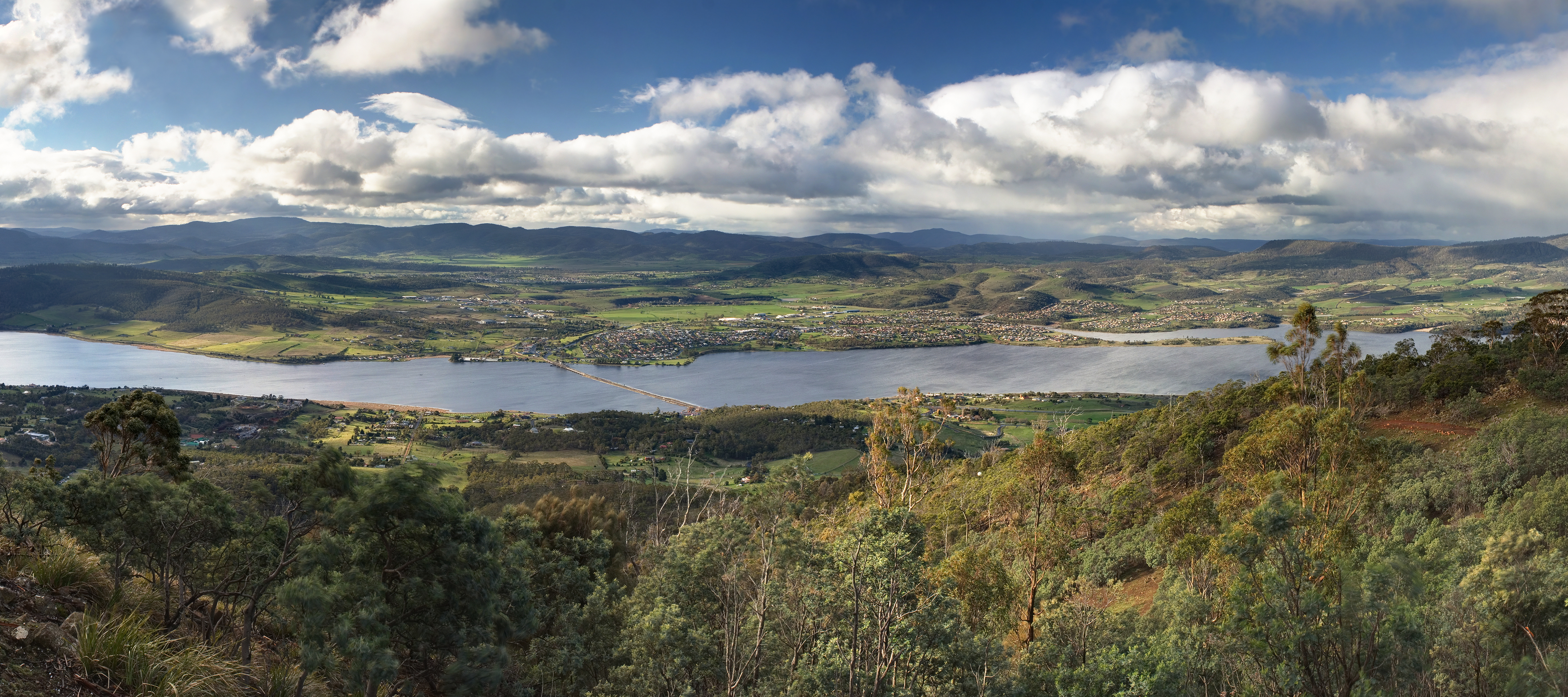
- Bridgewater (left) and Gagebrook (right)

- Interactive map of Bridgewater
- Coordinates: 42°44′5″S 147°14′39″E
- Country: Australia
- State: Tasmania
- City: Hobart
- LGA: Municipality of Brighton

Population
  - Total: 4,045 (2016 census)
- Postcode: 7030
Suburbs around Bridgewater
	Brighton
River Derwent	Bridgewater	Gagebrook
(Bridgewater Bridge)	Green Point	Gagebrook

Bridgewater is a northern suburb of Hobart, Tasmania, Australia, 19 kilometres from the central business district.

== Overview ==
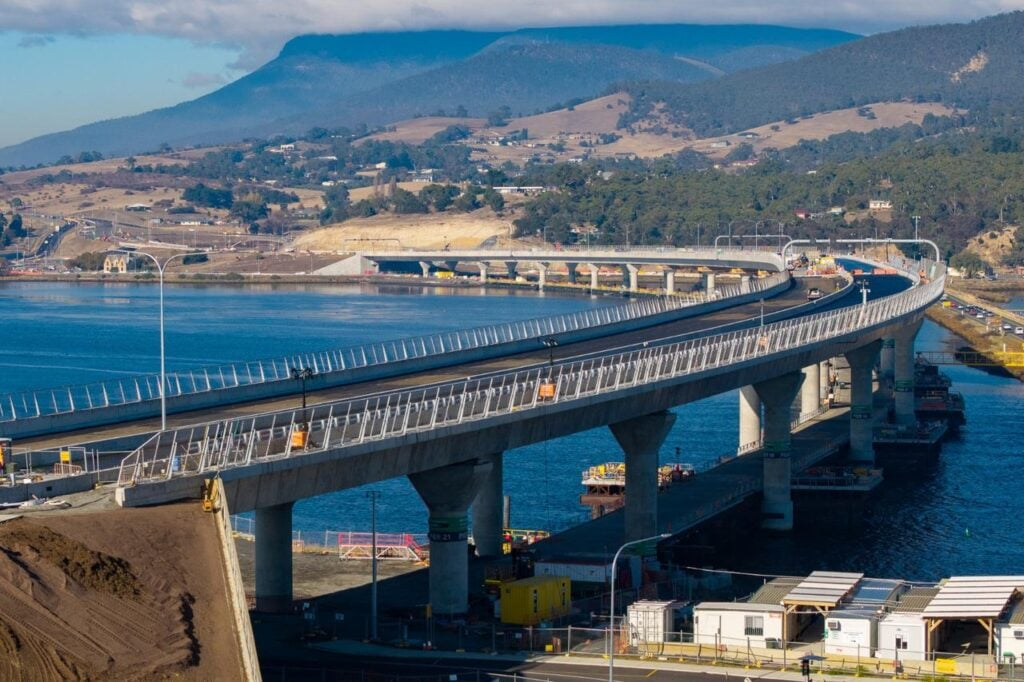
Bridgewater Bridge

Bridgewater is situated on the eastern shore of the River Derwent. It is a suburb of the local government area of the Municipality of Brighton. From a transport perspective, Bridgewater is one of the first suburbs encountered by visitors traveling from the state's north via the Midland Highway and the Brighton Bypass. The suburb connects to the western shore via the Bridgewater Bridge. Bridgewater was also once home to the railway station on the South line, which was used by commuters for travel into the city. It was demolished in April 1997.

== Culture ==
Bridgewater commonly has a reputation for its low social class and is noted as a disadvantaged area. Much of this is due to the mass of public housing, mainly built in the 1970s as part of a public housing project that was operating from 1944 to 1989. It also has one of the highest proportions of cigarette smokers in Australia.

== Education ==
Bridgewater has three primary schools: Northern Suburbs Christian School (private), St. Paul's Primary School (Catholic), and East Derwent Primary School (public). It also has a public high school, Bridgewater High School, which includes a school farm. East Derwent Primary School is a merger of the old Greenpoint and Bridgewater Primary Schools and is on the site of the former Greenpoint school.

The Government of Tasmania, through the Big Picture School initiative, has connected the public schools of the area together into what will be known as the "Jordan River Learning Federation", which will provide the area with K–12 public school education, through the East Derwent Primary School, Bridgewater High School, and the newly developed post year 10 education institute.

== Sport and recreation ==
Since 2011 Bridgewater has been the home to soccer club Derwent United FC at Weily Park.

== See also ==
- Bridgewater Jerry
