= Brighton, Tasmania =

Brighton
- Suburb
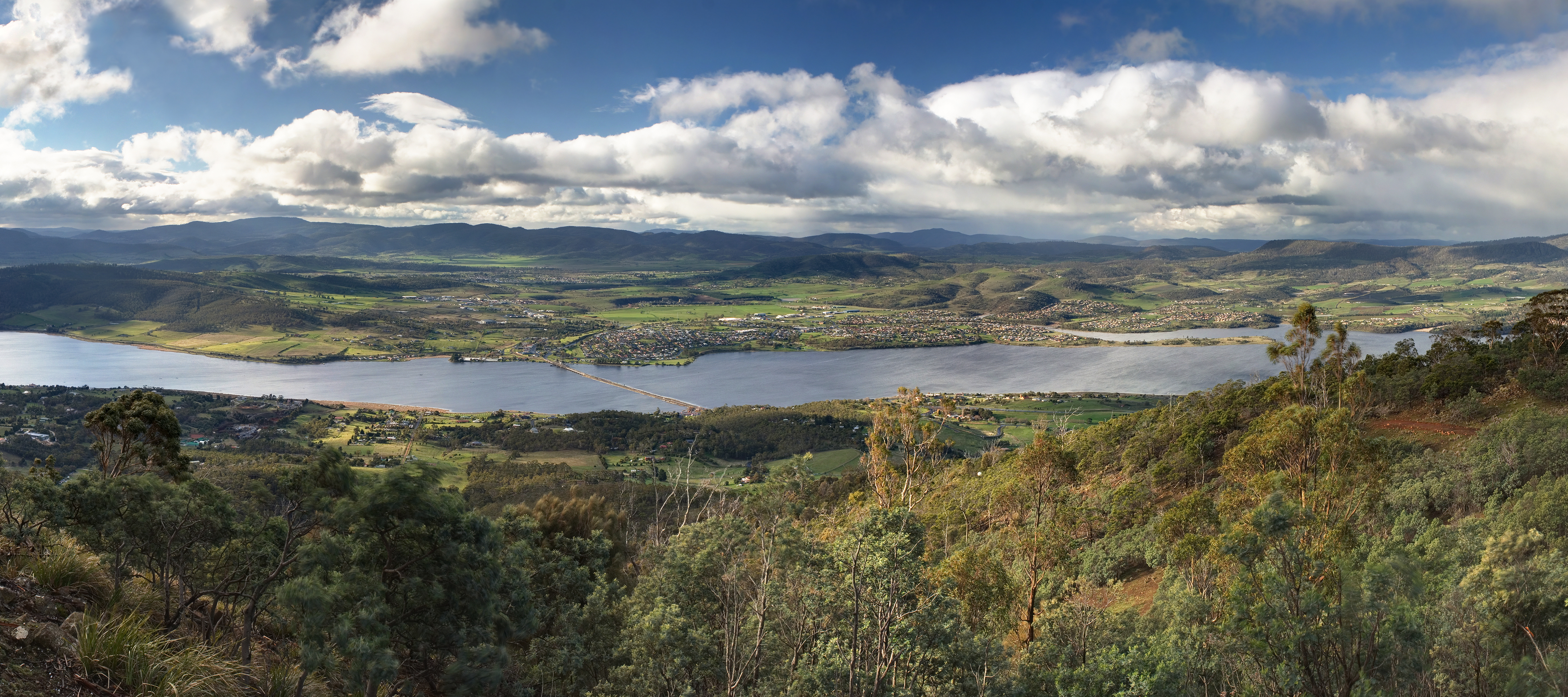
- Brighton is located in the rear left behind Bridgewater, Gagebrook

- Interactive map of Brighton
- Coordinates: 42°42′S 147°15′E
- Country: Australia
- State: Tasmania
- LGA: Brighton, Southern Midlands
- Location: 4 km (2.5 mi) from Bridgewater; 27 km (17 mi) from Hobart

Government
  - State electorate: Lyons
  - Federal division: Lyons

Population
  - Total: 4,983 (2021 census)
- Postcode: 7030
- Mean max temp: 18.7 °C (65.7 °F)
- Mean min temp: 7.3 °C (45.1 °F)
- Annual rainfall: 479.3 mm (18.87 in)

Brighton is a suburb 27 km north of Hobart, in Tasmania, Australia. It is between Pontville and the outer Hobart suburb of Bridgewater on the Midland Highway. At the 2021 census, Brighton had a population of 4,983.

== History ==
Before European settlement in Tasmania, Brighton was in the upper reaches of the homeland of the Moomairremener people, a band of the Oyster Bay Tribe.

From 1826 onwards, the township was the site of the Brighton Barracks, a military accommodation facility until sold off for subdivision in the early 2000s.

A Brighton Post Office opened on 1 June 1832. This was renamed Pontville in 1895 and closed in 1973. The current Brighton office opened on 22 May 1964.

A 42 kilometre railway line operated from Brighton to Aspley, commencing operations in 1891. Passenger services ended in 1927, and the goods service was replaced by trucks in 1947, with the line being removed shortly thereafter.

More recently, it was used as emergency accommodation for refugees fleeing the conflicts in eastern Europe, namely Kosovo.

The area surrounding Brighton was swept with bush and grass fires over the summer of January 2003, with fires reaching Cartwright Street, the old army camp, and the Midland highway placing the town under extreme threat.

The Brighton area is expected to see an increase in light industrial use, being serviced by both road and rail with the construction of the Brighton Transport Hub.

== Climate ==
Brighton has a temperate oceanic climate (Köppen: Cfb), with tepid summers and cool winters. Average maxima vary between 24.5 °C (76.1 °F) in January and 13.2 °C (55.8 °F) in July while average minima fluctuate between 11.7 °C (53.1 °F) in January and 3.5 °C (38.3 °F) in July. The mean annual precipitation is somewhat low, 479.3 millimetres (18.87 in), though well-distributed across the year, occurring within 153.0 precipitation days. Extreme temperatures have ranged from 41.1 °C (106.0 °F) on 4 January 2013 to −3.5 °C (25.7 °F) on 13 September 2013. Climate data was sourced from Campania, a township 14.4 kilometres (8.9 mi) east-northeast of Brighton.

Climate data for Brighton (42º41'24"S, 147º25'48"E, 45 m AMSL) (2000-2024 normals and extremes)
Month	Jan	Feb	Mar	Apr	May	Jun	Jul	Aug	Sep	Oct	Nov	Dec	Year
Record high °C (°F)	41.1 (106.0)	39.3 (102.7)	38.1 (100.6)	32.0 (89.6)	25.3 (77.5)	20.0 (68.0)	19.8 (67.6)	25.0 (77.0)	28.0 (82.4)	34.3 (93.7)	38.3 (100.9)	40.6 (105.1)	41.1 (106.0)
Mean daily maximum °C (°F)	24.5 (76.1)	23.9 (75.0)	22.3 (72.1)	19.0 (66.2)	15.9 (60.6)	13.6 (56.5)	13.2 (55.8)	14.2 (57.6)	16.3 (61.3)	18.2 (64.8)	20.4 (68.7)	22.7 (72.9)	18.7 (65.6)
Mean daily minimum °C (°F)	11.7 (53.1)	11.2 (52.2)	10.1 (50.2)	7.5 (45.5)	5.7 (42.3)	3.9 (39.0)	3.5 (38.3)	3.9 (39.0)	5.3 (41.5)	6.6 (43.9)	8.6 (47.5)	10.0 (50.0)	7.3 (45.2)
Record low °C (°F)	2.5 (36.5)	2.0 (35.6)	0.0 (32.0)	−1.7 (28.9)	−2.9 (26.8)	−3.2 (26.2)	−3.2 (26.2)	−3.1 (26.4)	−3.5 (25.7)	−3.0 (26.6)	−0.3 (31.5)	1.4 (34.5)	−3.5 (25.7)
Average precipitation mm (inches)	37.6 (1.48)	29.8 (1.17)	33.5 (1.32)	31.9 (1.26)	36.7 (1.44)	43.3 (1.70)	35.2 (1.39)	51.7 (2.04)	43.9 (1.73)	48.2 (1.90)	45.9 (1.81)	42.5 (1.67)	479.3 (18.87)
Average precipitation days (≥ 0.2 mm)	8.2	8.5	10.7	10.9	13.2	14.9	15.0	16.5	15.8	15.6	12.2	11.5	153
Average afternoon relative humidity (%)	43	47	48	53	57	63	62	57	54	52	50	44	52
Average dew point °C (°F)	7.9 (46.2)	9.3 (48.7)	8.5 (47.3)	7.0 (44.6)	5.9 (42.6)	5.2 (41.4)	4.6 (40.3)	4.1 (39.4)	4.7 (40.5)	5.5 (41.9)	7.6 (45.7)	7.2 (45.0)	6.5 (43.6)
Source: Bureau of Meteorology (2000-2024 normals and extremes)

== Brighton Training Centre ==
The area is also the site of a major horse racing training facility located at Brighton Racecourse known as the Brighton Training Centre, serving the thoroughbred, trotting and pacing industry.

Many good Tasmanian Thoroughbreds and Pacers have been trained at Brighton Racecourse since the early eighties including the 1986 Launceston Cup winner Epigram and Noble Sensation winner of the TRC Tasmanian Breeders Classic (LR), Thos Lyons S. (LR), TTC Gold Sovereign S. (LR), George Adams P. (LR); 2d TRC Tattersalls S. (LR), TTC Newmarket H. (LR), 3d VATC Autumn S. (G3), TTC Tasmanian Gns (LR), TRC Thomas Lyons S. (LR), Tattersall's S. (LR).

The Training centre is located north of the town centre on Racecourse Road. The original course proper was 2000 metres from start to finish and was home of the Brighton Cup until the racecourse was closed for training use only in 1973.

The course has undergone significant changes since the 1980s when a chipwood track was put in on the outer half of the course proper and a major redevelopment in late 2004 to become the present training centre with all training of horses ceasing at Elwick Racecourse along with the relocation of Elwick-based trainers to stables built along the back straight of the track.

== Notable residents ==
- Frederick Royden Chalmers (1881–1943) farmer, soldier and administrator
- George Peter Desailly (1823–1876) pastoralist
- Edward (Ned) Devine (1833–1908) coach driver
- John Ernest Cecil Lord (1870–1949) police commissioner and soldier
