= Mount Seymour, Tasmania =

Mount Seymour Tasmania
- Coordinates: 42°24′13″S 147°27′01″E
- Population: 75 (2016 census)
- Postcode(s): 7120
- Location: 15 km (9 mi) SE of Oatlands
- LGA(s): Southern Midlands
- Region: Central
- State electorate(s): Lyons
- Federal division(s): Lyons
Localities around Mount Seymour:
| Parattah | Andover | Andover |
| Stonor | Mount Seymour | Stonehenge, Baden |
| Stonor | Baden, Stonor, Whitefoord | Baden |

Mount Seymour is a rural locality in the local government area of Southern Midlands in the Central region of Tasmania. It is located about 15 kilometres (9.3 mi) south-east of the town of Oatlands. The 2016 census determined a population of 75 for the state suburb of Mount Seymour.

== History ==
Mount Seymour was gazetted as a locality in 1974.

== Geography ==
Mount Seymour (the mountain) is in the north of the locality.

== Road infrastructure ==
The C312 route (Tunnack Road) enters from the west and runs through to the south-east, where it exits. Route C315 (Black Gate Road) starts at an intersection with C312 and runs west until it exits.
