= Stonehenge, Tasmania =

Stonehenge Tasmania
- Coordinates: 42°24′34″S 147°38′36″E
- Population: 7 (2016 census)
- Postcode(s): 7120
- Location: 35 km (22 mi) SE of Oatlands
- LGA(s): Southern Midlands
- Region: Central
- State electorate(s): Lyons
- Federal division(s): Lyons
Localities around Stonehenge:
Lemont	Swanston, Lemont	Buckland
Whitefoord, Mount Seymour	Stonehenge	Buckland
Whitefoord	Whitefoord	Buckland

Stonehenge is a rural locality in the local government area (LGA) of Southern Midlands in the Central LGA region of Tasmania. The locality is about 35 kilometres (22 mi) south-east of the town of Oatlands. The 2016 census recorded a population of 7 for the state suburb of Stonehenge.

== History ==
Stonehenge was gazetted as a locality in 1972. The name was taken from a property in the area.

== Geography ==
Most of the boundaries are survey lines.

== Road infrastructure ==
Route C310 (Stonehenge Road / Inglewood Road) runs through from south to west.
