= Tunnack, Tasmania =

Tunnack
- Town
- Coordinates: 42°28′21″S 147°27′04″E
- Country: Australia
- State: Tasmania
- Region: Central
- LGA: Southern Midlands
- Location: 25 km (16 mi) SE of Oatlands

Government
  - State electorate: Lyons
  - Federal division: Lyons
- Elevation: 65 m (213 ft)

Population
  - Total: 212 (2021 census)
- Postcode: 7120
- Mean max temp: 15.4 °C (59.7 °F)
- Mean min temp: 5.1 °C (41.2 °F)
- Annual rainfall: 612.3 mm (24.11 in)
Localities around Tunnack
Stonor	Baden, Stonor	Whitefoord
Rhyndaston	Tunnack	Woodsdale
Colebrook	Colebrook	Levendale

Tunnack is a rural locality in the local government area of Southern Midlands in the Central region of Tasmania. It is located about 25 kilometres (16 mi) south-east of the town of Oatlands. The 2021 census determined a population of 212 for the state suburb of Tunnack.

== History ==
Tunnack was gazetted as a locality in 1974. The name is an Aboriginal word for “cold”.

== Geography ==
The Coal River forms much of the northern and western boundaries.

=== Climate ===
Tunnack experiences an oceanic climate (Köppen: Cfb) with mild, drier summers and cool, wetter winters. The wettest recorded day was 9 June 2011 with 114.0 mm (4.49 in) of rainfall. Cooled by its moderate altitude, Tunnack's extreme temperatures ranged from 37.4 °C (99.3 °F) on 25 January 2003 to −6.8 °C (19.8 °F) on 22 May 2010.

Climate data for Tunnack Fire Station (42.45°S 147.46°E) (462 m (1,516 ft) AMSL) (1997-2025)
Month	Jan	Feb	Mar	Apr	May	Jun	Jul	Aug	Sep	Oct	Nov	Dec	Year
Record high °C (°F)	37.4 (99.3)	34.1 (93.4)	35.2 (95.4)	28.3 (82.9)	22.0 (71.6)	16.0 (60.8)	15.7 (60.3)	17.9 (64.2)	22.6 (72.7)	27.6 (81.7)	32.5 (90.5)	37.4 (99.3)	37.4 (99.3)
Mean daily maximum °C (°F)	21.9 (71.4)	21.3 (70.3)	19.3 (66.7)	15.5 (59.9)	12.4 (54.3)	10.0 (50.0)	9.7 (49.5)	10.6 (51.1)	12.6 (54.7)	14.8 (58.6)	17.3 (63.1)	19.6 (67.3)	15.4 (59.7)
Mean daily minimum °C (°F)	9.1 (48.4)	8.9 (48.0)	7.5 (45.5)	5.3 (41.5)	3.5 (38.3)	2.1 (35.8)	1.5 (34.7)	1.9 (35.4)	3.3 (37.9)	4.4 (39.9)	6.2 (43.2)	7.5 (45.5)	5.1 (41.2)
Record low °C (°F)	−2.0 (28.4)	−1.7 (28.9)	−3.5 (25.7)	−5.3 (22.5)	−6.8 (19.8)	−6.3 (20.7)	−6.3 (20.7)	−6.1 (21.0)	−6.5 (20.3)	−5.4 (22.3)	−3.5 (25.7)	−1.1 (30.0)	−6.8 (19.8)
Average precipitation mm (inches)	45.9 (1.81)	37.2 (1.46)	46.1 (1.81)	39.9 (1.57)	46.0 (1.81)	65.1 (2.56)	42.0 (1.65)	60.0 (2.36)	55.9 (2.20)	61.2 (2.41)	59.3 (2.33)	52.6 (2.07)	612.3 (24.11)
Average precipitation days (≥ 0.2 mm)	9.2	9.1	11.1	12.0	15.1	17.3	17.6	17.4	15.6	15.1	13.3	12.1	164.9
Average afternoon relative humidity (%)	47	50	53	61	67	74	73	67	63	59	55	50	60
Average dew point °C (°F)	7.2 (45.0)	8.2 (46.8)	7.0 (44.6)	5.9 (42.6)	5.0 (41.0)	4.2 (39.6)	3.7 (38.7)	3.3 (37.9)	3.8 (38.8)	4.4 (39.9)	6.0 (42.8)	6.3 (43.3)	5.4 (41.8)
Source: Bureau of Meteorology (1997-2025)

== Road infrastructure ==
The C312 route (Tunnack Road / New Country Marsh Road) enters from the north and runs through to the south-east, where it exits. Route C342 (Eldon Road) starts at an intersection with C312 and runs south-west until it exits.
