= York Plains, Tasmania =

York Plains
- Town
- Coordinates: 42°16′08″S 147°26′26″E
- Country: Australia
- State: Tasmania
- Region: Central
- LGA: Southern Midlands
- Location: 10 km (6.2 mi) NE of Oatlands

Government
  - State electorate: Lyons
  - Federal division: Lyons

Population
  - Total: 69 (SAL 2021)
- Postcode: 7120
Localities around York Plains
Oatlands	Ross, Antill Ponds, Woodbury	Lemont
Oatlands	York Plains	Lemont
Oatlands	Andover, Pawtella, Lemont	Lemont

York Plains is a rural locality and town in the local government area of Southern Midlands in the Central region of Tasmania. It is located about 10 kilometres (6.2 mi) north-east of the town of Oatlands.

== History ==
York Plains was gazetted as a locality in 1974. The locality was named in 1811.

The 2016 census determined a population of 62 for the state suburb of York Plains. At the 2021 census, the population had increased to 69.

== Geography ==
Almost all boundaries are survey lines. The Main railway line passes through via the town from north-west to south.

== Road infrastructure ==
The C307 route (York Plains Road) enters from the west and runs through via the town to the east, where it exits. Route C309 (Nala Road) starts at an intersection with C307 and runs south until it exits. Route C306 (Stonehouse Road) starts at an intersection with C307 on the south-east boundary and runs away to the south.
