= Stonor, Tasmania =

Stonor Tasmania
- Coordinates: 42°24′32″S 147°23′56″E
- Population: 41 (2016 census)
- Postcode(s): 7119
- Location: 16 km (10 mi) S of Oatlands
- LGA(s): Southern Midlands
- Region: Central
- State electorate(s): Lyons
- Federal division(s): Lyons
Localities around Stonor:
Jericho	Jericho, Parattah, Oatlands	Parattah
Jericho	Stonor	Mount Seymour, Parattah, Baden, Tunnack
Tiberias	Rhyndaston, Tunnack	Tunnack

Stonor is a rural locality in the local government area of Southern Midlands in the Central region of Tasmania. It is located about 16 kilometres (9.9 mi) south of the town of Oatlands. The 2016 census determined a population of 41 for the state suburb of Stonor.

== History ==
Stonor was gazetted as a locality in 1974.

== Geography ==
The eastern shore of Lake Tiberius forms a small part of the western boundary. The Main railway line passes through from north-east to south-west.

== Road infrastructure ==
The C314 route (Stonor Road) enters from the north-west and runs through to the south-east, where it exits. Route C313 (Rhyndaston Road) starts at an intersection with C314 and runs south until it exits. Route C315 (Black Gate Road) starts from an intersection with C314 and runs north and east until it exits.
