= Colebrook, Tasmania =

Colebrook
- Town
- Coordinates: 42°31′54″S 147°21′31″E
- Country: Australia
- State: Tasmania
- Region: Central
- LGA: Southern Midlands
- Location: 29 km (18 mi) S of Oatlands

Government
  - State electorate: Lyons
  - Federal division: Lyons

Population
  - Total: 372 (SAL 2021)
- Postcode: 7027
Localities around Colebrook
Melton Mowbray	Rhyndaston, Tunnack	Levendale
Kempton, Bagdad	Colebrook	Levendale, Campania
Kempton	Campania	Campania

Colebrook is a rural locality and town in the local government area of Southern Midlands in the Central region of Tasmania. It is located about 29 kilometres (18 mi) south of the town of Oatlands. The 2021 census gave a population of 372 for Colebrook.

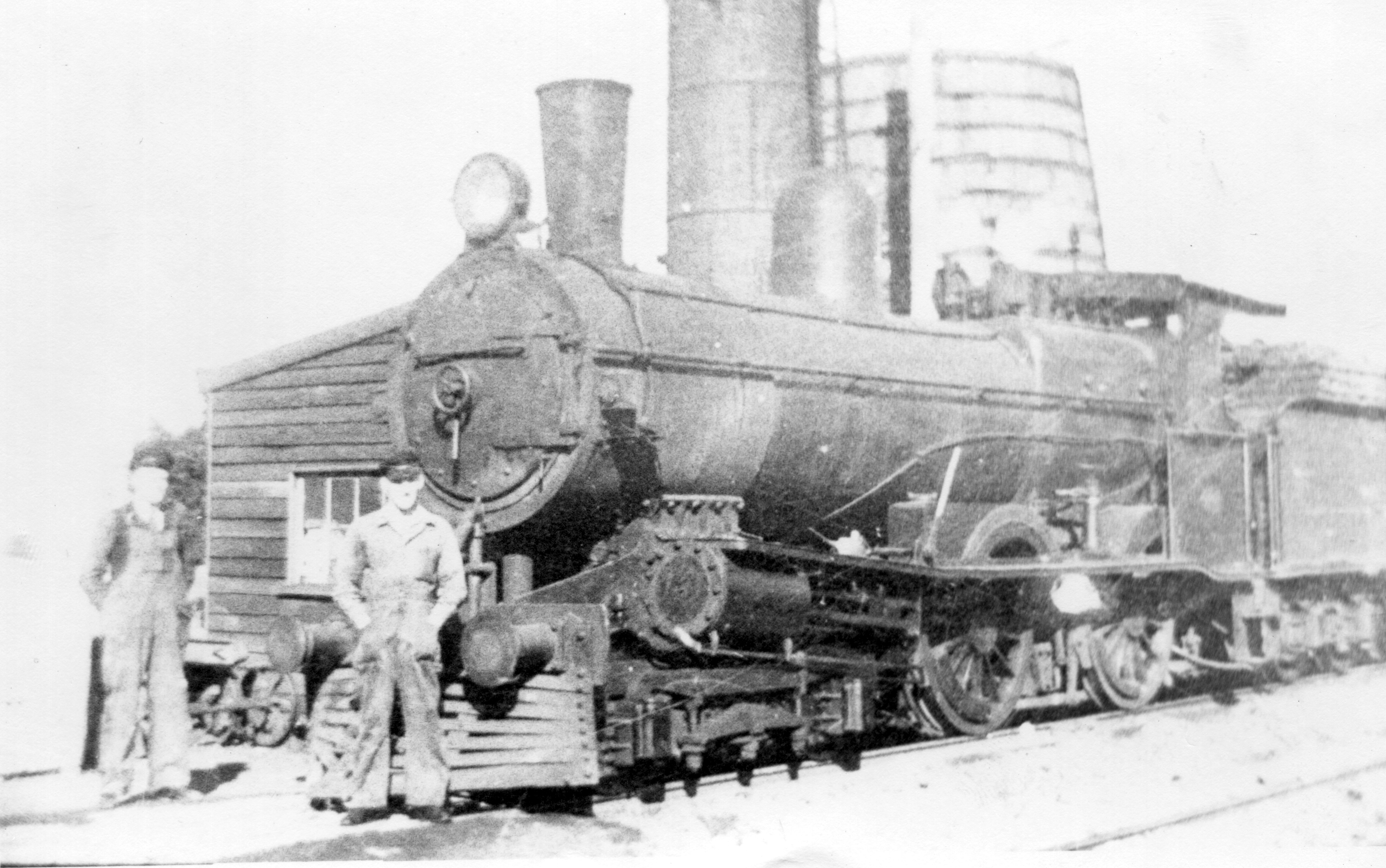
Colebrook, circa 1949

== History ==
Colebrook is a confirmed State suburb/locality for census purposes. It was formerly also known as Jerusalem. In 1894, the Jerusalem post office was renamed to Colebrook and the Lower Jerusalem post office was renamed to Woodlands, with corresponding changes made to the names of the train stations.

A Catholic monastery, Notre Dame Priory, was established 1km. south of the town in 2019.

== Demographics ==
The 2011 Australian census recorded the population of Colebrook as 373. In the 2016 census that number had fallen to 294, however in the 2021 census it had increased to 372.

== Geography ==
Almost all boundaries are survey lines. The South railway line, also known as the Main Line, passes through the town from north to south-east.

== Road infrastructure ==
The B31 route (Mud Walls Road / Colebrook Road) enters from the north-west and runs through via the town to the south-east, where it exits. Route C313 (Rhyndaston Road) starts at an intersection with B31 and runs north until it exits. Route C316 (Lovely Banks Road) starts at an intersection with B31 and runs north-west until it exits. Route C342 (Eldon Road) starts at an intersection with C313 and runs north-east until it exits.
