= Kempton, Tasmania =

Town in Tasmania, Australia

Kempton
- Town
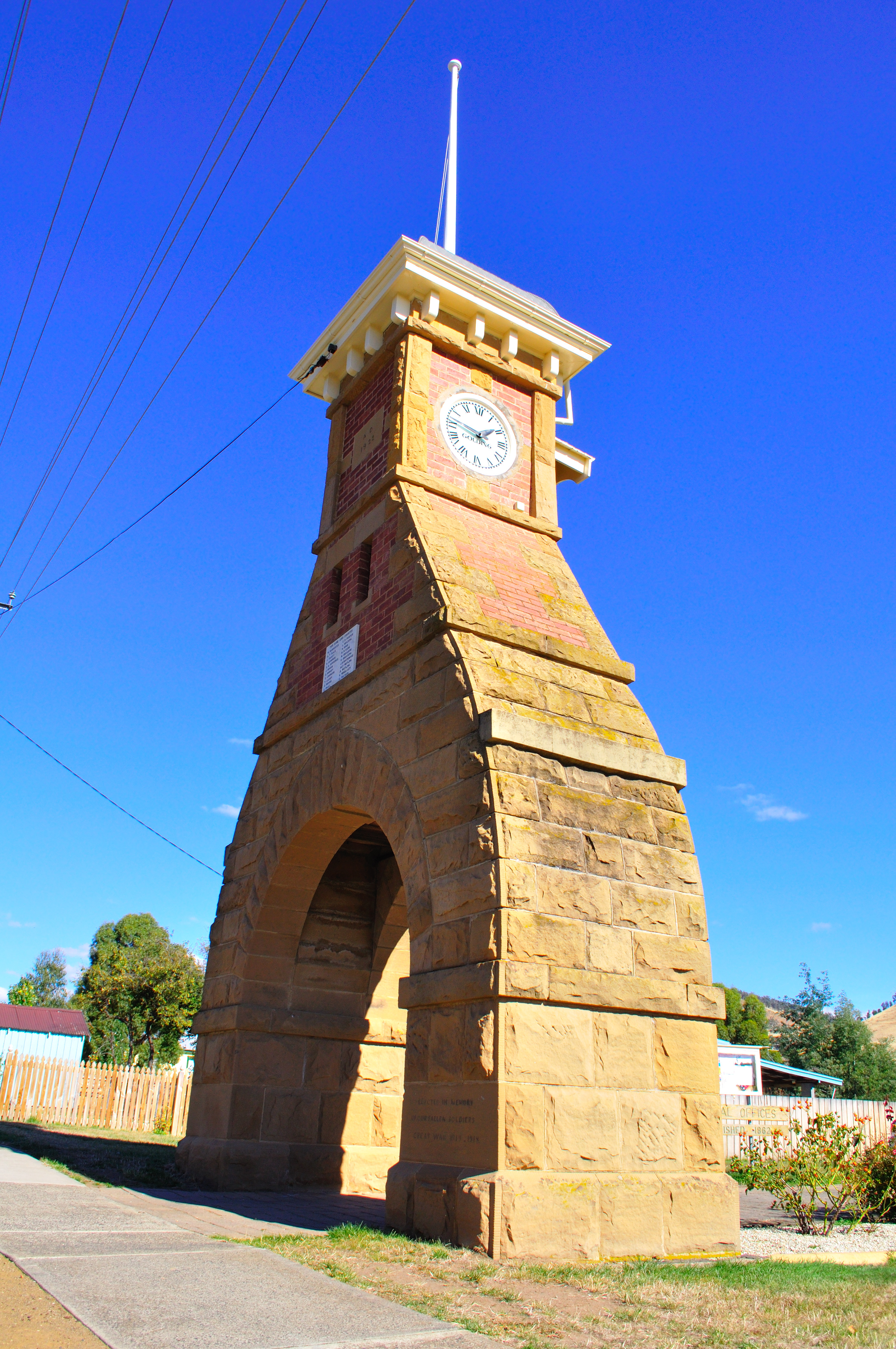
- Kempton, Tasmania

- Coordinates: 42°31′S 147°12′E
- Country: Australia
- State: Tasmania
- Region: Central
- LGA: Southern Midlands
- Location: 48 km (30 mi) N of Hobart; 36 km (22 mi) SW of Oatlands

Government
  - State electorate: Lyons
  - Federal division: Lyons

Population
  - Total: 386 (2016 census)
- Postcode: 7030
Localities around Kempton
Melton Mowbray	Melton Mowbray	Colebrook
Dysart	Kempton	Colebrook
Dysart	Dysart	Campania

Kempton is a village in the local government area (LGA) of the Southern Midlands in the Central LGA region of Tasmania. The locality is about 36 kilometres (22 mi) south-west of the town of Oatlands. The 2016 census recorded a population of 386 for the state suburb of Kempton. In a low rainfall region of plains and low hills, it is mostly used for grazing sheep.

== History ==
Originally the home of the Big River tribe of Aboriginal people, Kempton was first settled by Europeans in 1820. "Green Water Holes" was its original name, but by 1820 it had changed to "Green Water Ponds", which was then abbreviated to Green Ponds in 1821. Two convict stations were situated in Green Ponds and a military barracks at Glenfern Estate. In 1838 the town was renamed after early administrator and businessman Anthony Fenn Kemp, who established the property Mount Vernon immediately to the north of where the township later grew. The hotel at Kempton was a popular first night stop for the trip from Hobart to Launceston. Green Ponds Post Office opened on 1 June 1832 and was renamed Kempton in 1895.

A railway line connected the town with Hobart from 1891 until 1947. Kempton was gazetted as a locality in 1970.

== Geography ==
The Jordan River flows through the north-west corner.

== Road infrastructure ==
National Highway 1 (Midland Highway) passes through from south to north-west.
