= Rhyndaston, Tasmania =

Rhyndaston Tasmania
- Coordinates: 42°28′39″S 147°23′15″E
- Population: 73 (2021 census)
- Postcode(s): 7120
- Location: 25 km (16 mi) S of Oatlands
- LGA(s): Southern Midlands
- Region: Central
- State electorate(s): Lyons
- Federal division(s): Lyons
Localities around Rhyndaston:
Colebrook	Tiberias	Tunnack
Colebrook	Rhyndaston	Tunnack
Colebrook	Colebrook	Colebrook

Rhyndaston is a rural locality in the local government area (LGA) of Southern Midlands in the Central LGA region of Tasmania. The locality is about 25 kilometres (16 mi) south of the town of Oatlands. The 2021 census recorded a population of 73 for the state suburb of Rhyndaston.

== History ==
Rhyndaston was gazetted as a locality in 1974.

Originally named Flat Top Hill, it was renamed to Rhyndaston when a railway tunnel was built through the hill. It is believed to be a Welsh term for "mouth of the hole", and was conferred by Charles Meredith, the Colonial Treasurer.

== Geography ==
Most of the boundaries are survey lines.

== Road infrastructure ==
Route C313 (Rhyndaston Road) runs through from north to south.
