= Alan Scott (blacksmith) =

Australian maker of brick ovens and author of baking manual

- Born: 2 March 1936; Toorak, Victoria, Australia
- Died: 26 January 2009 (aged 72); Tasmania, Australia
- Occupation: Blacksmith
- Known for: Designing and building brick ovens and writing on the subject
- Spouse: Laura Scott
- Children: 3

Alan Scott (2 March 1936 – 26 January 2009) was a blacksmith and baking traditionalist who designed and built brick ovens and coauthored a book promoting their use for cooking breads and pizza. He built ovens in the United States, Canada, Europe, Australia, and New Zealand, and started the Ovencrafters company.

== Life ==
Scott was born in Toorak in Victoria, Australia on 2 March 1936. He graduated from Dookie Agricultural College, and afterwards went to work for a fertilizer company. Leaving his job at 25, Scott traveled throughout Australia, Ethiopia, Sudan, and Denmark—all hitchhiking. Eventually, he settled in Denmark and opened a jewelry store.

Scott emigrated to the United States from Australia in the mid-1960s, where he opened a smithy in Northern California. When a friend, Laurel Robertson, commissioned him to forge handles for a brick oven she intended to build, Scott became interested in the oven itself. He redesigned the oven to better retain heat. Scott soon became an expert in the construction and use of brick ovens. In 1999, he published The Bread Builders: Hearth Loaves and Masonry Ovens with his apprentice Daniel Wing. The Bread Builders contained a treatise on the history and science of bread making, and gave detailed specifications for how to build a brick oven. The book eventually sold over 25,000 copies.

Returning to Australia in 2004, Scott opened a practice in Oatlands. He also became involved in the effort to recommence operations at the Callington Mill. Scott's interest in the project stemmed in part from the desirable properties of slowly stone-ground flour, which include the wheat's germ oil being ground into the flour and the retention of nutrients due to low milling temperatures.

Scott died on 26 January 2009 in Tasmania of congestive heart failure. His company, Ovencrafters, is now run by his children. The company designs and builds custom brick ovens, and has designed and created numerous ovens for clients throughout the United States, as well as in other countries, including Canada and Australia.

== Advocacy ==
Scott spent much of his time conducting workshops and overseeing the building of community ovens, which he believed brought communities together. He further lectured on and encouraged small-scale industry, environmental stewardship, community connectivity and spiritual consideration. His business, Ovencrafters, pushed for "policy with principles, commerce with morality, wealth with work, and science with humanity".

== Bibliography ==
- Scott, Alan; Daniel Wing (1999). The Bread Builders: Hearth Loaves and Masonry Ovens. Chelsea Green Publishing. ISBN 978-1-890132-05-7.
