= Melton Mowbray, Tasmania =

Melton Mowbray Tasmania
- Coordinates: 42°28′13″S 147°10′53″E
- Population: 65 (2016 census)
- Postcode(s): 7030
- Location: 63 km (39 mi) N of Hobart
- LGA(s): Southern Midlands, Central Highlands
- Region: Midlands
- State electorate(s): Lyons
- Federal division(s): Lyons
Localities around Melton Mowbray:
	Lower Marshes	Jericho
Bothwell	Melton Mowbray
Apsley	Kempton	Colebrook

Melton Mowbray is a locality and small rural community in the local government areas of Southern Midlands and Central Highlands, in the Midlands region of Tasmania. It is located about 63 kilometres (39 mi) north of the city of Hobart. The 2016 census determined a population of 65 for the state suburb of Melton Mowbray.

== History ==
The locality was originally called Cross Marsh. In 1840 Samuel Blackwell, who was born in Melton Mowbray in Leicestershire, emigrated to Tasmania and settled in the district. He built the Melton Mowbray Hotel in 1849. The locality name was gazetted and confirmed in 1974.

== Road infrastructure ==
National Highway 1 passes through from south-west to north-east, and the A5 road (Lake Highway) branches off to the north-west. This intersection is at the tripoint of road route zones 1, 3 and 5.
