= Whitefoord, Tasmania =

Whitefoord
- Town
- Coordinates: 42°25′56″S 147°31′40″E
- Country: Australia
- State: Tasmania
- Region: Central
- LGA: Southern Midlands
- Location: 25 km (16 mi) SE of Oatlands

Government
  - State electorate: Lyons
  - Federal division: Lyons

Population
  - Total: 59 (2016 census)
- Postcode: 7120
Localities around Whitefoord
Baden	Mount Seymour, Stonehenge	Stonehenge
Baden, Tunnack	Whitefoord	Stonehenge
Tunnack	Tunnack, Woodsdale	Stonehenge

Whitefoord is a rural locality in the local government area of Southern Midlands in the Central region of Tasmania. It is located about 25 kilometres (16 mi) south-east of the town of Oatlands. The 2016 census determined a population of 59 for the state suburb of Whitefoord.

== History ==
Whitefoord was gazetted as a locality in 1972. It may have been named for John Whitefoord, a police magistrate in the district in the 1830s.

== Geography ==
All boundaries are survey lines.

== Road infrastructure ==
The C310 route (Woodsdale Road / Stonehenge Road) enters from the west and runs through to the south-east, where it exits. Route C318 (a continuation of Woodsdale Road) starts at an intersection with C310 and runs south-east until it exits.
