= Doctors Point =

- Town
- Coordinates: 41°47′20″S 146°40′56″E
- Country: Australia
- State: Tasmania
- Region: Central
- LGA: Central Highlands
- Location: 118 km (73 mi) N of Hamilton

Government
  - State electorate: Lyons
  - Federal division: Lyons

Population
  - Total: 5 (2016 census)
- Postcode: 7304
Localities around Doctors Point
Central Plateau	Central Plateau	Breona
Central Plateau	Doctors Point	Great Lake
Central Plateau	Brandum	Great Lake

Doctors Point is a rural locality in the local government area (LGA) of Central Highlands in the Central LGA region of Tasmania. The locality is about 118 kilometres (73 mi) north of the town of Hamilton. The 2016 census recorded a population of 5 for the state suburb of Doctors Point.

== History ==
Doctors Point is a confirmed locality.

== Geography ==
The waters of Great Lake form most of the southern and eastern boundaries.

== Road infrastructure ==
Route A5 (Highland Lakes Road) runs through from north-east to south.
