= Pawtella, Tasmania =

Pawtella Tasmania
- Coordinates: 42°17′22″S 147°30′21″E
- Population: 39 (2016 census)
- Postcode(s): 7120
- Location: 18 km (11 mi) E of Oatlands
- LGA(s): Southern Midlands
- Region: Central
- State electorate(s): Lyons
- Federal division(s): Lyons
Localities around Pawtella:
York Plains	York Plains	York Plains
York Plains	Pawtella	Lemont
Andover	Andover	Lemont

Pawtella is a rural locality in the local government area (LGA) of Southern Midlands in the Central LGA region of Tasmania. The locality is about 18 kilometres (11 mi) east of the town of Oatlands. The 2016 census recorded a population of 39 for the state suburb of Pawtella.

== History ==
Pawtella was gazetted as a locality in 1972. The name is believed to be an Aboriginal word for ringtail possum.

== Geography ==
Most of the boundaries are survey lines.

== Road infrastructure ==
Route C309 (Nala Road) runs through from north to south.
