= Breona, Tasmania =

Breona
- Town
- Coordinates: 41°47′14″S 146°42′12″E
- Country: Australia
- State: Tasmania
- Region: Central
- LGA: Central Highlands
- Location: 120 km (75 mi) N of Hamilton

Government
  - State electorate: Lyons
  - Federal division: Lyons

Population
  - Total: 14 (2016 census)
- Postcode: 7304
Localities around Breona
Central Plateau	Central Plateau	Central Plateau
Central Plateau	Breona	Great Lake
Doctors Point	Great Lake	Great Lake

Breona is a rural locality in the local government area (LGA) of Central Highlands in the Central LGA region of Tasmania. The locality is about 120 kilometres (75 mi) north of the town of Hamilton. The 2016 census recorded a population of 14 for the state suburb of Breona.

== History ==
Breona was gazetted as a locality in 1969. It was previously known as Tiagarra. Breona is believed to be an Aboriginal word for "fish".

In the past it has been a trout hatchery and a tourist resort.

== Geography ==
The waters of the Great Lake form most of the southern and eastern boundaries.

== Road infrastructure ==
Route A5 (Highland Lakes Road) runs through from north to south.
