= Antill Ponds, Tasmania =

Antill Ponds
- Town
- Coordinates: 42°12′53″S 147°24′38″E
- Country: Australia
- State: Tasmania
- Region: Central
- LGA: Southern Midlands
- Location: 12 km (7.5 mi) N of Oatlands

Government
  - State electorate: Lyons
  - Federal division: Lyons

Population
  - Total: 0 (2021 census)
- Postcode: 7120
Localities around Antill Ponds
Woodbury	Woodbury	Woodbury
Woodbury, Oatlands	Antill Ponds	Woodbury, York Plains
Oatlands	Oatlands	York Plains

Antill Ponds is a rural locality in the local government area (LGA) of Southern Midlands in the Central LGA region of Tasmania. The locality is about 12 kilometres (7.5 mi) north of the town of Oatlands. The 2021 census recorded "no people or a very low population".

== History ==
Antill Ponds was gazetted as a locality in 1974. The name was given by Governor Macquarie in 1811, in honour of Captain Henry Colden Antill, his aide-de-camp.

== Geography ==
Almost all of the boundaries are survey lines. The North-South Railway Line passes through from south to north.

== Road infrastructure ==
National Highway 1 (Midland Highway) passes through from south to north.
