= Oatlands railway line =

Branch of Main Line in Tasmania, Australia

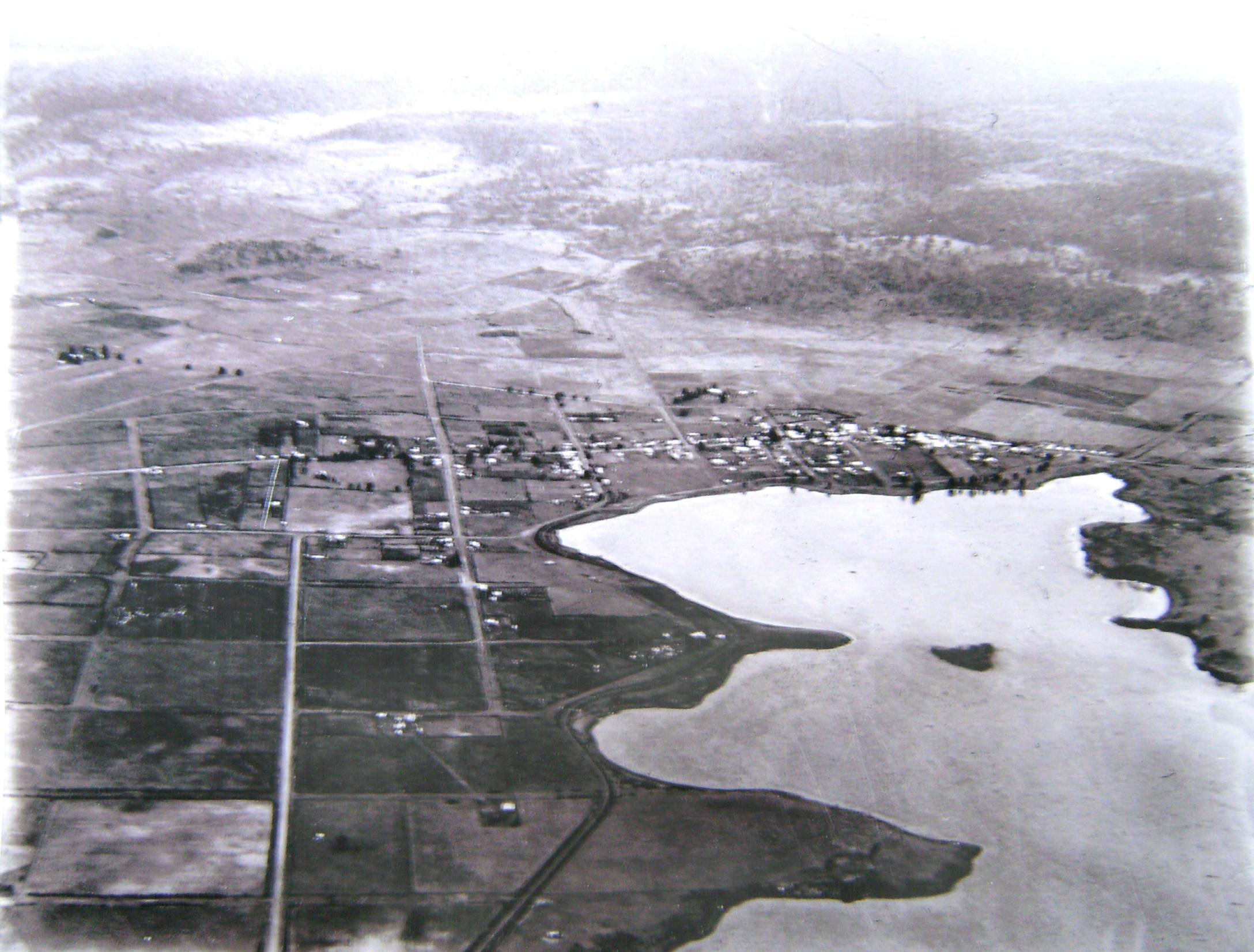
- Oatlands from the air, note the railway in the center of the image

Overview
- Status: Closed
- Locale: Oatlands, Tasmania

Service
- Type: Heavy rail

History
- Opened: 13 May 1885

Technical
- Line length: 6.5 km (4.0 mi)
- Track gauge: 1,067 mm (3 ft 6 in)

The Oatlands railway line was a short branch of the Main Line from Launceston to Hobart in Tasmania, which was built to give rail access to the town of Oatlands. The railway opened on 13 May 1885 and it closed on 10 June 1949. The line branched off of the Main Line in Parattah outside the Tudor style Parattah Hotel and followed parallel to the Main Line for approximately 700 metres (2,300 ft) before branching off in a north west direction towards Lake Dulverton. From there, the railway followed the lake's shoreline before turning in on Wellington Street and ending where it intersects with High Street. The original station building is now used as a child care centre. Much of the former route is now used as a bike trail, a section of it is clearly visible as a terrace like formation at Mahers Point and part of an embankment and small bridge runs alongside the road to Parattah, where it crosses Parattah Creek. The locomotive "Big Ben" used to operate the line from 1948 until the line closed a year later in 1949.

== See also ==
- Rail transport in Tasmania
