= Woodsdale, Tasmania =

Woodsdale
- Town
- Coordinates: 42°28′40″S 147°34′34″E
- Country: Australia
- State: Tasmania
- Region: Central, South-east
- LGA: Southern Midlands, Glamorgan–Spring Bay
- Location: 32 km (20 mi) SE of Oatlands

Government
  - State electorate: Lyons
  - Federal division: Lyons

Population
  - Total: 82 (2016 census)
- Postcode: 7120
Localities around Woodsdale
Whitefoord	Whitefoord, Stonehenge	Stonehenge
Tunnack	Woodsdale	Stonehenge, Buckland
Tunnack	Levendale, Buckland	Buckland

Woodsdale is a rural locality and town in the local government areas of Southern Midlands and Glamorgan–Spring Bay in the Central and South-east regions of Tasmania. It is located about 32 kilometres (20 mi) south-east of the town of Oatlands. The 2016 census determined a population of 82 for the state suburb of Woodsdale.

== History ==
Woodsdale was gazetted as a locality in 1972.

== Geography ==
The Bluff River forms most of the eastern boundary.

== Road infrastructure ==
The C318 route (Woodsdale Road / Buckland Road) enters from the north-west and runs through via the town to the south-east, where it exits. Route C311 (a continuation of Woodsdale Road) starts at an intersection with C318 and runs south until it exits.
