= Apsley, Tasmania =

Apsley
- Town
- Coordinates: 42°25′27″S 147°08′39″E
- Country: Australia
- State: Tasmania
- Region: Central
- LGA: Central Highlands, Southern Midlands
- Location: 35 km (22 mi) SW of Oatlands

Government
  - State electorate: Lyons
  - Federal division: Lyons

Population
  - Total: 44 (2021 census)
- Postcode: 7030
Localities around Apsley
Bothwell	Lower Marshes	Melton Mowbray
Bothwell	Apsley	Melton Mowbray
Bothwell	Melton Mowbray	Melton Mowbray

Apsley is a rural locality in the local government areas of Central Highlands and Southern Midlands in the Central region of Tasmania, Australia. It is located about 35 kilometres (22 mi) south-west of the town of Oatlands, and is 59 kilometres north-east of the state capital, Hobart. The 2021 census recorded a population of 44 for Apsley.

== History ==
Apsley was gazetted as a locality in 1974.

== Geography ==
The Jordan River flows through from north to south, forming small sections of the northern and southern boundaries as it enters and exits.

== Transport infrastructure ==
The A5 route (Highland Lakes Road) enters from the south-east and runs through the village to exit in the west. Route C529 (Lower Marshes Road) starts at an intersection with A5 in the village and runs north until it exits.

On 23 April 1891, the Tasmanian Government Railways opened a railway line that branched off the South railway line at Brighton and ran for 42 kilometres to terminate at Apsley. It closed on 30 June 1947.
