= Andover, Tasmania =

Andover Tasmania
- Coordinates: 42°20′06″S 147°31′08″E
- Population: 39 (2021 census)
- Postcode(s): 7120
- Location: 16 km (10 mi) E of Oatlands
- LGA(s): Southern Midlands
- Region: Central
- State electorate(s): Lyons
- Federal division(s): Lyons
Localities around Andover:
Oatlands	York Plains, Pawtella	Lemont
Oatlands, Parattah	Andover	Lemont
Parattah	Parattah	Stonehenge

Andover is a rural locality in the local government area (LGA) of Southern Midlands in the Central LGA region of Tasmania. The locality is about 16 kilometres (9.9 mi) east of the town of Oatlands. The 2021 census recorded a population of 39 for Andover. It consists of mostly farming land and several historic pastoral properties. Andover covers an area of 73.446 square kilometres.

== History ==
Andover was gazetted as a locality in 1974.

Eastern Marshes Siding Post Office opened in 1888, and was renamed Andover in 1893. It closed in 1966.

It was historically a village on the Little Swan River, in the county of Somerset, Tasmania about 62 km (50 miles) from Hobart. It was named by Lieutenant Francis Tabart in 1831.

== Geography ==
The Little Swanport River rises in the locality and flows through to the south-eastern boundary.

== Road infrastructure ==
Route C310 (Inglewood Road) passes through from west to south-east. Route C307 (Lemont Road) starts at an intersection with C310 and runs east until it exits. Route C309 (Nala Road) starts at an intersection with C310 and runs north and east until it exits.
