= Baden, Tasmania =

Baden Tasmania
- Coordinates: 42°25′20″S 147°28′43″E
- Population: 36 (2016 census)
- Postcode(s): 7120
- Location: 21 km (13 mi) SE of Oatlands
- LGA(s): Southern Midlands
- Region: Central
- State electorate(s): Lyons
- Federal division(s): Lyons
Localities around Baden:
Mount Seymour	Mount Seymour	Mount Seymour
Stonor	Baden	Whitefoord
Tunnack	Tunnack	Tunnack

Baden is a rural locality in the local government area of Southern Midlands in the Central region of Tasmania. It is located about 21 kilometres (13 mi) south-east of the town of Oatlands. The 2016 census determined a population of 36 for the state suburb of Baden.

== History ==
Baden was gazetted as a locality in 1968. The locality was named for Lord Baden Powell, in honour of three local men who served under him in the Boer War.

== Geography ==
The Coal River forms parts of the southern boundary.

== Road infrastructure ==
The C312 route (Tunnack Road) enters from the north-west and runs through to the south, where it exits. Route C314 (Stonor Road) starts at an intersection with C312 and runs west until it exits. Route C310 (Woodsdale Road) starts at an intersection with C312 and runs north-east until it exits.
