= Reynolds Neck =

- Town
- Coordinates: 41°51′40″S 146°41′46″E
- Country: Australia
- State: Tasmania
- Region: Central
- LGA: Central Highlands
- Location: 109 km (68 mi) N of Hamilton

Government
  - State electorate: Lyons
  - Federal division: Lyons
- Elevation: 1,100 m (3,600 ft)

Population
  - Total: 7 (2016 census)
- Postcode: 7304
Localities around Reynolds Neck
Central Plateau	Brandum	Great Lake
Central Plateau	Reynolds Neck	Great Lake
Central Plateau	Liawenee	Great Lake

Reynolds Neck is a rural locality in the local government area (LGA) of Central Highlands in the Central LGA region of Tasmania. The locality is about 109 kilometres (68 mi) north of the town of Hamilton. The 2016 census recorded a population of 7 for the state suburb of Reynolds Neck.

== History ==
Reynolds Neck is a confirmed locality. The name was derived from when Reynolds Island was attached to the shore of Great Lake.

== Geography ==
The waters of Great Lake form the eastern boundary.

== Road infrastructure ==
Route A5 (Highland Lakes Road) runs through from north to south.
