= Tiberias, Tasmania =

Tiberias Tasmania
- Coordinates: 42°25′55″S 147°21′37″E
- Population: 5 (2016 census)
- Postcode(s): 7120
- Location: 23 km (14 mi) S of Oatlands
- LGA(s): Southern Midlands
- Region: Central
- State electorate(s): Lyons
- Federal division(s): Lyons
Localities around Tiberias:
Jericho	Stonor, Jericho	Stonor
Rhyndaston, Jericho	Tiberias	Stonor
Rhyndaston	Rhyndaston	Rhyndaston

Tiberias is a rural locality in the local government area (LGA) of Southern Midlands in the Central LGA region of Tasmania. The locality is about 23 kilometres (14 mi) south of the town of Oatlands. The 2016 census recorded a population of 5 for the state suburb of Tiberias.

== History ==
Tiberias was gazetted as a locality in 1974.

== Geography ==
The boundaries of the locality consist of survey lines and the western, northern and eastern shores of Lake Tiberias. The North-South Railway Line passes through the east of the locality.

== Road infrastructure ==
Route C313 (Rhyndaston Road) passes to the east. From there, Tiberias Road provides access to the locality.
