= Jericho, Tasmania =

Locality in Tasmania, Australia

Jericho Tasmania
- Coordinates: 42.377640°S 147.310392°E
- Population: 59 (2016 census)
- Established: 1816
- Postcode(s): 7120
- Elevation: 358 m (1,175 ft)
- Location: 14 km (9 mi) SW of Oatlands; 71 km (44 mi) N of Hobart; 125 km (78 mi) S of Launceston
- LGA(s): Southern Midlands Council
- Region: Central
- State electorate(s): Lyons
- Federal division(s): Lyons
Mean max temp	Mean min temp	Annual rainfall
15.5 °C; 60 °F	5.0 °C; 41 °F	549.1 mm 21.6 in
Localities around Jericho:
Lower Marshes	Oatlands	Oatlands
Melton Mowbray, Lower Marshes	Jericho	Stonor
Melton Mowbray	Melton Mowbray	Tiberias

Jericho is a rural locality in the local government area (LGA) of Southern Midlands in the Central LGA region of Tasmania. The locality is about 14 kilometres (8.7 mi) south-west of the town of Oatlands. The 2016 census recorded a population of 59 for the state suburb of Jericho.

== History ==
Jericho was gazetted as a locality in 1974. The area was named by the explorer Hugh Germain, a private in the Royal Marines. He was said by James Backhouse in his book A Narrative of a Visit to the Australian Colonies, published in 1901, to carry two books in his saddlebags while traveling: the Bible and the Arabian Nights, which he used as inspiration when he named places.

It is a historical village in the centre of Tasmania between Hobart and Launceston off the Midland Highway. Founded in 1816, it is one of the oldest townships in Australia. Jericho Post Office opened on 1 June 1832 and closed in 1962.

Like its better-known neighbour, Oatlands, the main road of Jericho contains many fine examples of early colonial sandstone architecture, and constructions including examples of convict cut culverts, bridges and walls, many of which date from the 1830s. The main Anglican church, St James (built in 1888) contains the grave of Trooper John Hutton Bisdee, who was the first Tasmanian to be awarded the Victoria Cross.

The most notable buildings in Jericho are the Commandant's Cottage (built in 1842) and the Probation Station (built in 1840), which was constructed to house the 200 convicts who were used to construct the road linking Hobart and Launceston. The land adjacent to the station was originally known as "Fourteen Tree Plain" and was the site of the second horse race in the colony of Van Diemens Land, held in April 1826, the first being at "Orielton Park" owned by Edward Lord on 5 October 1816 according to The Hobart Town Gazette and Southern Reporter of that date.

The town flourished for a time in the nineteenth century as a stage coach resting post, but declined in the twentieth century. Now bypassed by the Midland Highway, the state's main north–south highway, it is a sleepy village that retains its colonial charm and is part of Tasmania's Heritage Highway.

== Geography ==
The waters of Lake Tiberias form part of the south-eastern boundary.

== Road infrastructure ==
National Route 1 (Midland Highway) runs through from south to north. Route B32 (Mud Walls Road) starts at an intersection with Route 1 and runs south until it exits. Route C314 (Stonor Road) starts at an intersection with Route 1 and runs east until it exits. Route C529 (Lower Marshes Road) starts at an intersection with Route 1 and runs north-west until it exits.
