= Woodbury, Tasmania =

Woodbury
- Town
- Coordinates: 42°11′11″S 147°23′12″E
- Country: Australia
- State: Tasmania
- Region: Central
- LGA: Southern Midlands
- Location: 15 km (9.3 mi) N of Oatlands

Government
  - State electorate: Lyons
  - Federal division: Lyons

Population
  - Total: 27 (2016 census)
- Postcode: 7120
Localities around Woodbury
Interlaken	Tunbridge	Ross
Interlaken	Woodbury	Ross
Interlaken	Antill Ponds	York Plains

Woodbury is a rural locality in the local government area (LGA) of Southern Midlands in the Central LGA region of the island state of Tasmania, Australia. The locality is about 15 kilometres (9.3 mi) north of the town of Oatlands. The 2016 census recorded a population of 27 for the state suburb of Woodbury.

== History ==
Woodbury was gazetted as a locality in 1974.

== Geography ==
Many of the boundaries of the locality consist of survey lines. The North-South Railway Line passes through the centre of the locality.

== Road infrastructure ==
National Highway 1 (Midland Highway) passes through from south to north.
