= Swanston, Tasmania =

Swanston
- Town
- Coordinates: 42°20′23″S 147°44′50″E
- Country: Australia
- State: Tasmania
- Region: Central
- LGA: Southern Midlands
- Location: 47 km (29 mi) E of Oatlands

Government
  - State electorate: Lyons
  - Federal division: Lyons

Population
  - Total: 19 (2016 census)
- Postcode: 7120
Localities around Swanston
Lemont	Lemont	Tooms Lake
Lemont	Swanston	Little Swanport, Buckland, Tooms Lake
Stonehenge	Stonehenge	Buckland

Swanston is a rural locality in the local government area (LGA) of Southern Midlands in the Central LGA region of Tasmania. The locality is about 47 kilometres (29 mi) east of the town of Oatlands. The 2016 census recorded a population of 19 for the state suburb of Swanston.

== History ==
Swanston is a confirmed locality.

A town of this name was proclaimed for this area in June 1858 by Governor Sir Henry Young, but it was never developed.

== Geography ==
Most of the boundaries are survey lines. The Little Swanport River flows through the locality before forming part of the north-eastern boundary.

== Road infrastructure ==
Route C310 (Stonehenge Road) leads to Swanston Road, which provides access to the locality.
