= Southern Midlands Council =

- Local government area
- Interactive map of Southern Midlands Council
- Coordinates: 42.4346°S 147.4006°E
- Country: Australia
- State: Tasmania
- Region: Southern Midlands region
- Established: 2 April 1993
- Council seat: Oatlands

Government
  - Mayor: Edwin Batt
  - State electorate: Lyons
  - Federal division: Lyons

Area
  - Total: 2,616 km^{2} (1,010 sq mi)

Population
  - Total: 6,118 (2018)
  - Density: 2.3387/km^{2} (6.0572/sq mi)
- Website: Southern Midlands Council
LGAs around Southern Midlands Council
Northern Midlands	Northern Midlands	Glamorgan Spring Bay
Central Highlands	Southern Midlands Council	Glamorgan Spring Bay
Derwent Valley	Brighton	Sorell

Southern Midlands is a local government body in Tasmania, covering the southern region of the Tasmanian central midlands. Southern Midlands is classified as a rural local government area and has a population of 6,118, the major localities of the region include Campania, Kempton, Mangalore and the principal town of Oatlands.

== History and attributes ==
On 2 April 1993, Oatlands and Green Ponds were amalgamated with parts of the municipalities of Brighton and Richmond to form the new Southern Midlands Council. Southern Midlands is classified as rural, agricultural and large (RAL) under the Australian Classification of Local Governments.

== Council ==
=== Current composition ===
Name	Position	Party Affiliation
Edwin Batt	Mayor / Councillor	Independent Labor
Karen Dudgeon	Deputy Mayor / Councillor	Independent
Anthony Bisdee	Councillor	Independent
Donna Blacklow	Councillor	Independent
Donald Fish	Councillor	Independent
Fraser Miller	Councillor	Independent
Robert Campbell	Councillor	Independent

== Localities ==
- Andover
- Antill Ponds
- Apsley
- Baden
- Bagdad
- Black Hills
- Brighton
- Broadmarsh
- Campania
- Colebrook
- Dromedary
- Dysart
- Elderslie
- Interlaken
- Jericho
- Kempton
- Lemont
- Levendale
- Lower Marshes
- Magra
- Mangalore
- Melton Mowbray
- Mount Seymour
- Oatlands
- Orielton
- Parattah
- Pawtella
- Pelham
- Pontville
- Rhyndaston
- Runnymede
- Stonehenge
- Stonor
- Swanston
- Tea Tree
- Tiberias
- Tooms Lake
- Tunbridge
- Tunnack
- Whitefoord
- Woodbury
- Woodsdale
- York Plains

== See also ==
- Local government areas of Tasmania
