= Marlborough Highway =

Highway in Tasmania, Australia

Marlborough Highway Tasmania

General information
- Type: Highway
- Length: 31.4 km (20 mi)
- Route number(s): B11

Major junctions
- South end: Lyell Highway, Bronte Park
- North end: Highlands Lake Road, Miena

Highway system
- Highways in Australia; National Highway • Freeways in Australia; Highways in Tasmania

The Marlborough Highway is a minor highway in Tasmania. It links the Lyell Highway to the Highlands Lake Road and cuts short the otherwise very long journey from the West Coast to the Central Highlands.

The road leaves the Lyell Highway near Bronte Park and travels overland to Miena, on the Great Lake. There are no settlements along its route.

Marlborough was an historical name for the area at the southern end of the highway, also known as Bronte, south of Bronte Park.

The road is unsealed, and in times of heavy snow it cannot be passed.
