= Rachael Treasure =

Australian journalist, author and novelist

- Born: Rachael Jennifer Smith; 4 December 1968 (age 57); Hobart, Tasmania, Australia
- Education: Fahan School
- Alma mater: Charles Sturt University; Orange Agricultural College
- Occupations: Journalist, author and novelist
- Spouse: John Treasure
- Website: rachaeltreasure.com

Rachael Jennifer Treasure (née Smith; born 4 December 1968) is an Australian journalist, author and novelist. A former jillaroo, and reporter for the Australian Broadcasting Corporation on rural affairs, she is a passionate working dog trainer and in 2007 received Tasmania's rural woman of the year award.

== Early life ==
In the early 1990s Rachael worked out of the ABC Sale office in Victoria. She met her ex-husband, John Treasure, in 1996 while a reporter and started helping John and his brother with their High Plains Droving horse riding business on weekends. This entailed taking tourists on their cattle droving and salting trips on the Dargo High Plains. The Treasure family has been droving cattle in this area since the 1870s.

In this period Rachael developed an interest in dog psychology and training with trainer Paul Macphail and became herself an instructor for training working dogs.

Rachael then moved to Queensland to work on a cattle station, which provided Rachael with the opportunity to write her first novel, Jillaroo, which became an iconic work of Australian fiction and began a flood of novels in the 'rural lit' genre. She then moved home to Tasmania to develop her interests in regenerative agriculture, dog training and breeding, and breeding Waler stock horses on Rachael's family property at Runnymede.

== Bestselling novelist ==
Her three novels, Jillaroo, The Stockmen, and The Rouseabout, have all been bestsellers in Australia selling more than 100,000 combined copies by the end of 2007. Random House signed her to a four-book contract for British release during 2008. She has since gone on to write three further best-selling novels, The Cattleman's Daughter, The Farmers Wife and Cleanskin Cowgirls, two short story collections, The Girl & the Ghost Grey-Mare and Fifty Bales of Hay, a dog training manual Dog Speak and a book of inspirations, Don't Fence Me In. Five of her novels, The Stockmen, The Rouseabout, Jillaroo, The Farmer's Wife and The Cattleman's Daughter, have been translated and published in German, the first two as Tal der Sehnsucht : Australien-Saga (München : Blanvalet, 2006) and Wo der Wind singt : Australien-Saga (München : Blanvalet, 2008).

== Community activism ==
In 2008 Levendale Primary School was under threat of closure due to low student numbers. Rachael Treasure proposed to the community that vacant farmhouses be put up for rent of $1 per week to attract more families to the area. The offer attracted interest from around Australia, New Zealand and as far afield as Japan and Singapore.

"It's the only thing Levendale has, we don't have a shop, a pub, or anything to fall back on, this is all we have, is our school, and it keeps the women supported and networking on behalf of the men as well, so it kind of flows through the whole community." Rachael Treasure told an ABC reporter.

== Books ==
=== Novels ===
- Jillaroo (UK title: River Run Deep), Camberwell, Vic. : Penguin Books, 2002. ISBN 0-14-300024-1
- The Stockmen (UK title: Timeless Land), Camberwell, Vic. : Penguin Group (Australia), 2004. ISBN 0-670-04293-5
- The Rouseabout (UK title: The Dare), Camberwell, Vic. : Viking, 2007. ISBN 978-0-670-07065-7 ISBN 0670070653
- The Cattleman's Daughter (UK title: Through the Fire), Camberwell, Vic : Penguin Group (Australia), 2009
- Fifty Bales of Hay HarperCollins Australia December 2012
- The Farmer's Wife (Sequel to "Jillaroo") HarperCollins Australia April 2013
- Cleanskin Cowgirls HarperCollins Australia 2014

=== Other writing ===
- "Dog Speak" Self Published: Create Space USA 2007
- "Don't Fence Me In" HarperCollins Australia 2014
