= Campania, Tasmania =

Campania
- Town
- Coordinates: 42°39′50″S 147°25′16″E
- Country: Australia
- State: Tasmania
- LGA: Southern Midlands Council, City of Clarence
- Location: 25 km (16 mi) N of Hobart

Government
  - State electorate: Lyons, Franklin
  - Federal division: Lyons, Franklin

Population
  - Total: 934 (2016 census)
- Postcode: 7026
Localities around Campania
Colebrook	Colebrook, Woodsdale	Woodsdale
Mangalore	Campania	Buckland
Tea Tree	Richmond, Orielton	Kellevie

Campania is a township in Tasmania's Coal River Valley, in the Southern Midlands Council.

It is one of the most important wine-producing regions of Tasmania, and has had commercial vineyards since the mid-19th century.

== History ==
Campania developed around a railway station built in 1876 on land that was formerly a section of the Campania Estate owned by James Brock, and contains several historical buildings.

Campania Post Office opened on 15 September 1873.

== Demographics ==
The 2006 Census by the Australian Bureau of Statistics counted 742 persons in Campania on census night. Of these, 51.8% were male and 48.2% were female.

The majority of residents (87.2%) are of Australian birth, with another 4.2% from England.

The age distribution of Campania residents is comparable to that of the greater Australian population. 67.2% of residents were over 25 years in 2006, compared to the Australian average of 66.5%; and 32.8% were younger than 25 years, compared to the Australian average of 33.5%.

== Road infrastructure ==
Route B31 (Colebrook Road) goes through Campania from north-east to south-east.

== Climate ==
Climate data for Campania
Month	Jan	Feb	Mar	Apr	May	Jun	Jul	Aug	Sep	Oct	Nov	Dec	Year
Record high °C (°F)	41.1 (106.0)	37.0 (98.6)	38.0 (100.4)	32.0 (89.6)	25.0 (77.0)	20.0 (68.0)	19.0 (66.2)	25.0 (77.0)	27.8 (82.0)	34.3 (93.7)	34.8 (94.6)	38.1 (100.6)	41.1 (106.0)
Mean daily maximum °C (°F)	24.3 (75.7)	23.9 (75.0)	22.1 (71.8)	18.9 (66.0)	15.9 (60.6)	13.6 (56.5)	13.1 (55.6)	14.3 (57.7)	16.1 (61.0)	17.8 (64.0)	20.8 (69.4)	22.7 (72.9)	18.6 (65.5)
Mean daily minimum °C (°F)	11.3 (52.3)	11.2 (52.2)	9.9 (49.8)	7.4 (45.3)	5.7 (42.3)	3.7 (38.7)	3.2 (37.8)	4.2 (39.6)	5.3 (41.5)	6.4 (43.5)	8.6 (47.5)	9.9 (49.8)	7.2 (45.0)
Record low °C (°F)	3.0 (37.4)	2.0 (35.6)	0.0 (32.0)	−1.7 (28.9)	−2.9 (26.8)	−3.0 (26.6)	−2.7 (27.1)	−3.0 (26.6)	−2.0 (28.4)	−3.0 (26.6)	−0.3 (31.5)	1.9 (35.4)	−3.0 (26.6)
Average precipitation mm (inches)	37.2 (1.46)	32.6 (1.28)	36.5 (1.44)	35.7 (1.41)	30.5 (1.20)	40.9 (1.61)	37.0 (1.46)	55.5 (2.19)	48.9 (1.93)	42.2 (1.66)	42.4 (1.67)	36.9 (1.45)	475.6 (18.72)
Average precipitation days	8.7	8.4	10.9	11.4	13.1	14.8	14.9	15.9	17.2	16.3	11.7	11.4	154.7
