= Brandum, Tasmania =

Rural locality in Tasmania

Brandum
- Town
- Coordinates: 41°49′44″S 146°40′17″E
- Country: Australia
- State: Tasmania
- Region: Central
- LGA: Central Highlands
- Location: 113 km (70 mi) N of Hamilton

Government
  - State electorate: Lyons
  - Federal division: Lyons

Population
  - Total: 11 (2016 census)
- Postcode: 7304
Localities around Brandum
Central Plateau	Doctors Point	Great Lake
Central Plateau	Brandum	Great Lake
Central Plateau	Reynolds Neck	Great Lake

Brandum is a rural locality in the local government area (LGA) of Central Highlands in the Central LGA region of Tasmania. The locality is about 113 kilometres (70 mi) north of the town of Hamilton. The 2016 census recorded a population of 11 for the state suburb of Brandum.

== History ==
Brandum is a confirmed locality. It is named for the adjacent Brandum Bay, which was named after the early settlers and pioneers, Daniel Brandum and his wife Margaret née Gunn, in the district.

== Brandum family ==
Daniel Brandum was born about 1819, Studham, Bedfordshire, England. At birth Daniel's last name was Brandom. However his name was misspelt in the ship register which bought him to Tasmania. His convict name remained Brandon until he later changed it to Brandum. There is speculation the second, and intentional, name change was due to the shame of being a convict. Daniel was transported to Australia as a convict on 2 Feb 1848 from Hertfordshire, England aboard the Mount Stewart Elphinstone having been convicted on 4 Oct 1844 for stealing two handfuls of wheat. Daniel received his ticket of freedom in 1857. He went on to marry Margaret Gunn in Launceston at The Manse of the Free Church of Scotland in 1867. He was a shepherd for Chares Headlam, the biggest landowner in Tasmania at the time, from 1867 to 1897 at which point his son John took over the role due to his father's age. Daniel Brandum died at "Allan Vale", Great Lakes District in the town which is now called Brandum. He is buried at Bothwell Municipal Cemetery General. A dam was built in 1916 and in 1920 the Headlam family put the property up for sale. A second dam was built in 1922 with more since then. Today the water is 20 meters above the level of when the Brandum's resided there.

== Local legend ==
There is a local legend that Margaret Brandum, known and called Grannie Brandum by the locals, had hidden a treasure in her stove. As a result, children in the 1920s, after the area had been dammed, would swim out to the site of the cottage and dive down to its remains in search of the treasure. Today, Allanvale Bay which covers most of the original property, is the only memorial of any kind to the land that lies beneath. Brandum Bay and the shacks at the settlement of Brandum are the only tangible reference to the Brandum's and their decades of life there at the Great Lakes.

== Geography ==
The waters of the Great Lake form the eastern boundary.

== Road infrastructure ==
Route A5 (Highland Lakes Road) runs through from north to south.
