= Lower Marshes, Tasmania =

Lower Marshes Tasmania
- Coordinates: 42°20′19″S 147°12′00″E
- Population: 9 (2016 census)
- Postcode(s): 7030
- Location: 60 km (37 mi) NE of Hamilton
- LGA(s): Central Highlands, Southern Midlands
- Region: Central
- State electorate(s): Lyons
- Federal division(s): Lyons
Localities around Lower Marshes:
Bothwell	Bothwell, Oatlands	Oatlands
Bothwell	Lower Marshes	Jericho, Oatlands
Bothwell	Apsley	Jericho

Lower Marshes is a rural locality in the local government areas (LGA) of Central Highlands and Southern Midlands in the Central LGA region of Tasmania. The locality is about 60 kilometres (37 mi) north-east of the town of Hamilton. The 2016 census recorded a population of 9 for the state suburb of Lower Marshes.

== History ==
Lower Marshes was gazetted as a locality in 1974. It was previously known as Rutland and as Pooles Marsh.

== Geography ==
The Exe Rivulet forms the north-eastern boundary. The Jordan River flows through from east to south-west.

== Road infrastructure ==
Route C529 (Lower Marshes Road) runs through from south-east to south-west.
