= Lake Dulverton =

Lake in Tasmania, Australia

- Location in Tasmania
- Location: Central East, Tasmania
- Coordinates: 42.309651°S 147.382304°E
- Type: Sandstone lagoon
- Primary inflows: Parattah Creek; Netting Creek
- River sources: Jordan River; Blackman River (piped)
- Primary outflows: Dulverton Rivulet
- Catchment area: 3,430 ha (8,500 acres)
- Basin countries: Australia
- Max. length: 2.64 km (1.64 mi)
- Max. width: 1.62 km (1.01 mi)
- Surface area: 233 ha (580 acres)
- Average depth: 2–3 m (6 ft 7 in – 9 ft 10 in)
- Max. depth: 3 m (9.8 ft) approx.
- Surface elevation: 400 m (1,300 ft) AHD
- Islands: Mary's Island
- Settlements: Oatlands

Lake Dulverton is a 230-to-233-hectare (570-to-580-acre) shallow lake or sandstone lagoon located adjacent to the town of Oatlands in the Southern Midlands region of Tasmania, Australia.

The lake has an uneven shoreline with many low sandstone cliffs and overhangs. The only island in the lake, Mary's Island, is a small sandstone rock roughly 80 metres (260 ft) long with a few cedars growing on it. The lake dried up in 1993 and remained dry for years until heavy rains in August 2010, filled the lake to near full supply level. During this dry period, two levees were built across the lake dividing it into three sections. Only the smallest section near the Callington Mill was able to remain full.

The floor of the lake is composed of peaty soils, rock and sand. When full, the waters of the lake quickly fill with pondweed and numerous waterbirds. The lake forms part of a wildlife sanctuary.

== See also ==
- List of reservoirs and dams in Australia § Tasmania
- List of lakes of Australia § Tasmania
