= Tunbridge, Tasmania =

Tunbridge
- Town
- Coordinates: 42°07′36″S 147°26′48″E
- Country: Australia
- State: Tasmania
- Region: Central
- LGAs: Northern Midlands; Southern Midlands
- Location: 24 km (15 mi) N of Oatlands

Government
  - State electorate: Lyons
  - Federal division: Lyons

Population
  - Total: 145 (2016 census)
- Postcode: 7120
Localities around Tunbridge
Ross	Ross	Ross
Interlaken	Tunbridge	Ross
Interlaken	Woodbury	Woodbury

Tunbridge is a rural locality in the local government areas (LGA) of Northern Midlands and Southern Midlands in the Central LGA region of Tasmania. The locality is about 24 kilometres (15 mi) north of the town of Oatlands. The 2016 census recorded a population of 145 for the state suburb of Tunbridge.

== History ==
Tunbridge was originally a coaching stop on the Hobart to Launceston road, now known as the Midland Highway. It was named after one of its three original coaching inns, the Tunbridge Wells, which in turn was named after Tunbridge Wells in Kent, England.

In its coaching heyday it had three coaching inns, the Tunbridge Wells Inn, the Victoria Inn and the York Inn. Each inn was associated with a different coaching company. The Tunbridge Wells serviced J. E. Cox Coaches, the Victoria Inn serviced Samuel Page Coaches and the York Inn serviced Alfred Burbury Coaches. Tunbridge Post Office opened in 1856.

Tunbridge was gazetted as a locality in 1974.

== Geography ==
The Blackman River flows through, via the Blackman Dam, from south-west to north-east.

== Road infrastructure ==
National Highway 1 (Midland Highway) passes through from south to north-east. Route C526 (Tunbridge Tier Road) starts at an intersection with NH1 and runs west until it exits.

== Notes and references ==
An original Samuel Page coach, belonging to Samuel Page Coaches, on display in Tunbridge's Park
