= Callington Mill =

Heritage site in Tasmania, Australia

Coordinates: 42°17′56″S 147°22′34″E

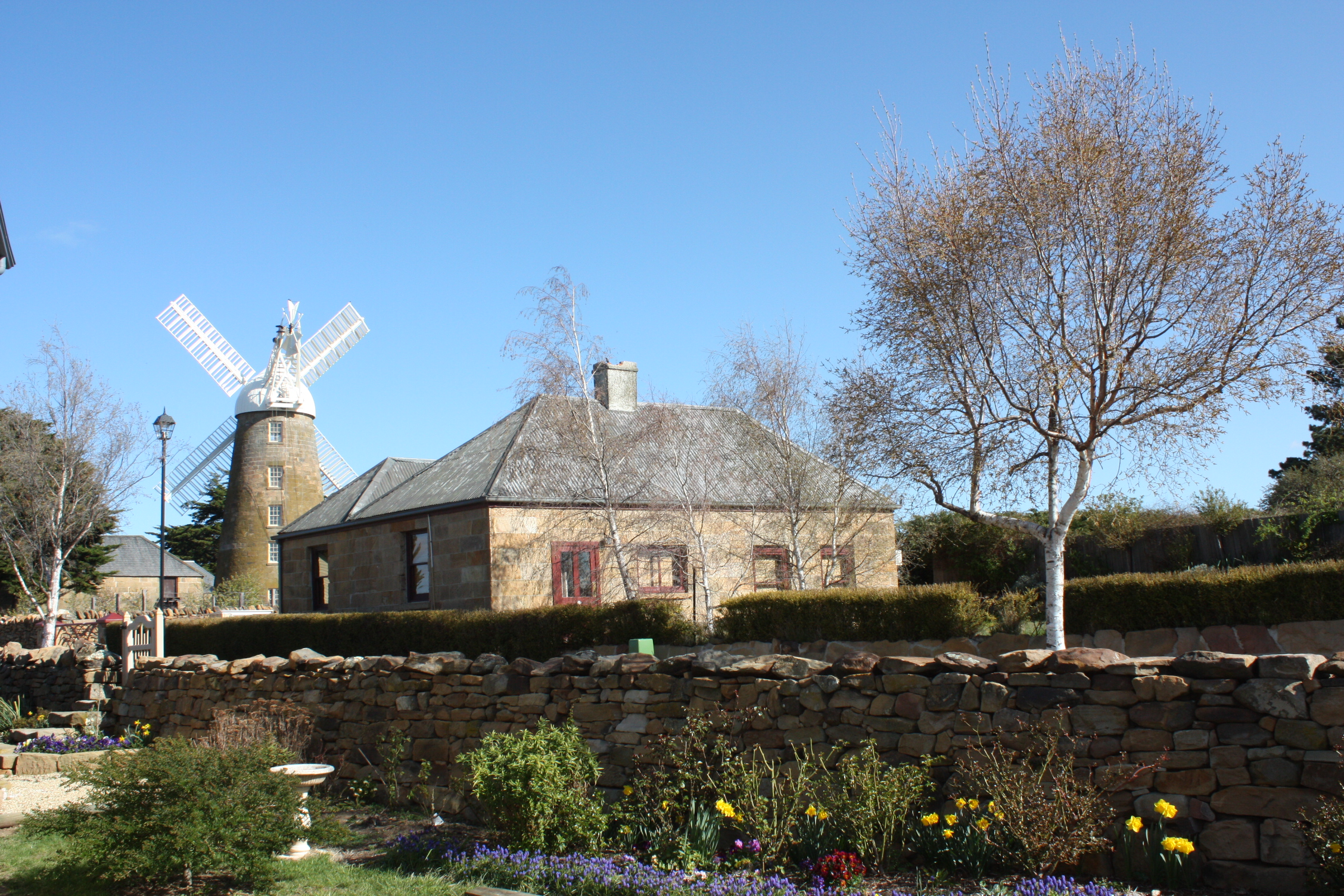
Callington Mill today - a fully operational mill

Callington Mill is a Lincolnshire tower mill built in 1837 in Oatlands, Tasmania by John Vincent. It was restored in 2021 so that it is now in full working order and is the only operating mill of its type in the Southern Hemisphere. It is the third oldest windmill in Australia. Traditional baker and blacksmith Alan Scott was a central figure at the mill. Today the mill is a major tourist attraction of Oatlands. Visitors are able to climb the internal stairs for a view across Oatlands and surrounds. The mill site comprises the windmill, a granary, stable, miller's cottage and mill owner's house.

== The Vincent family ==
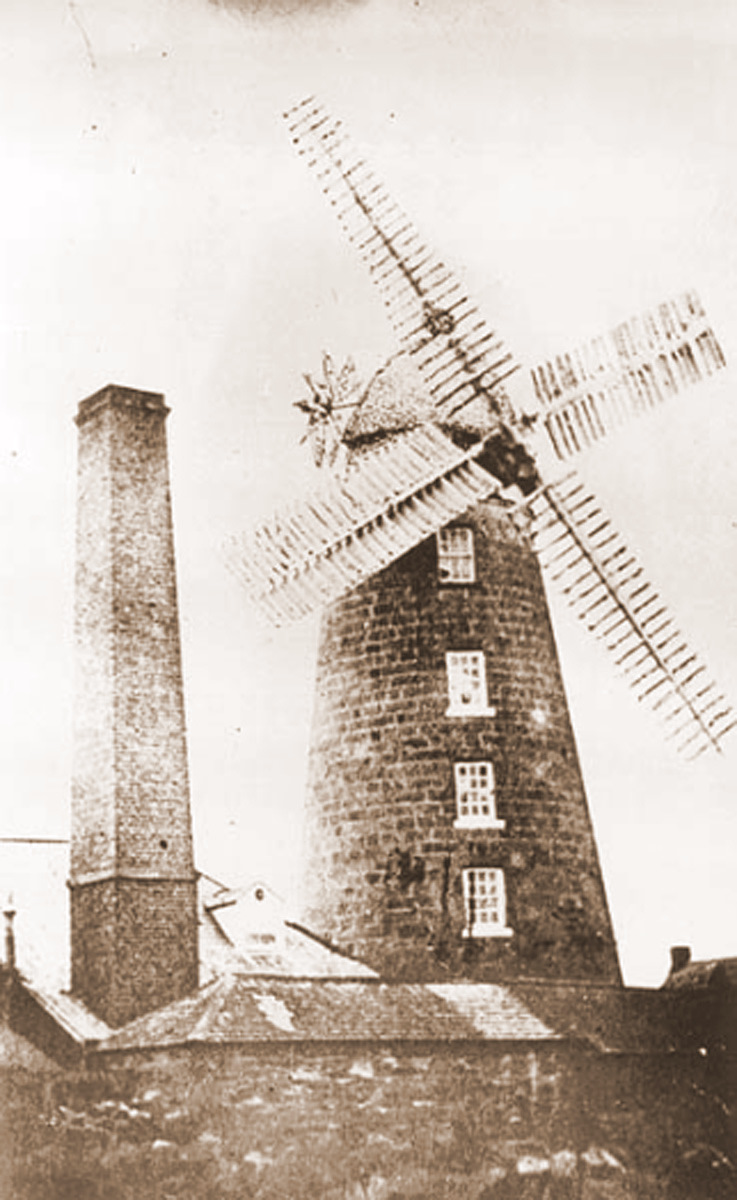
The mill circa 1860 showing the windmill and the steam engine chimney installed by John Vincent Junior

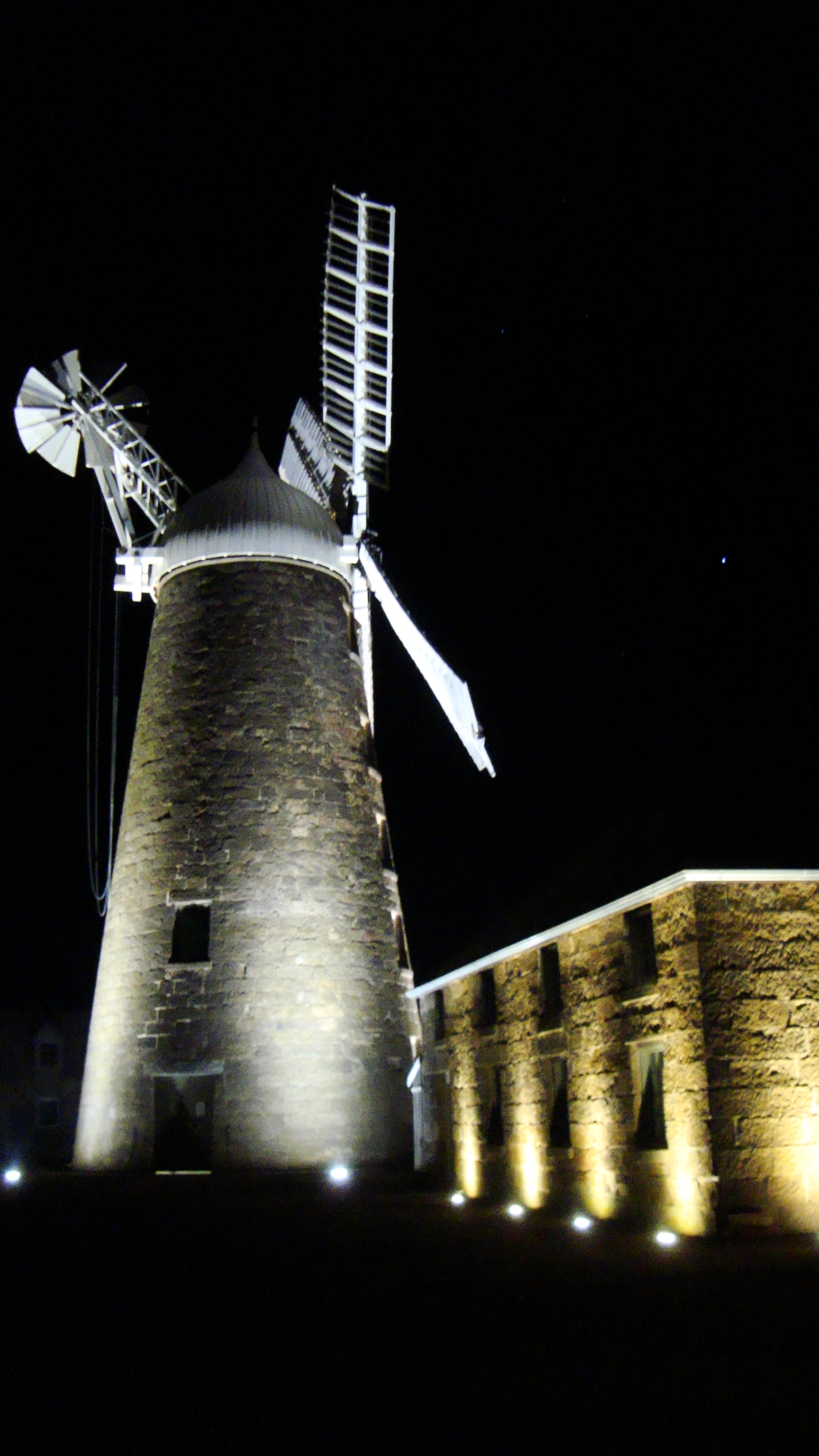
Callington Mill, after restoration in 2010

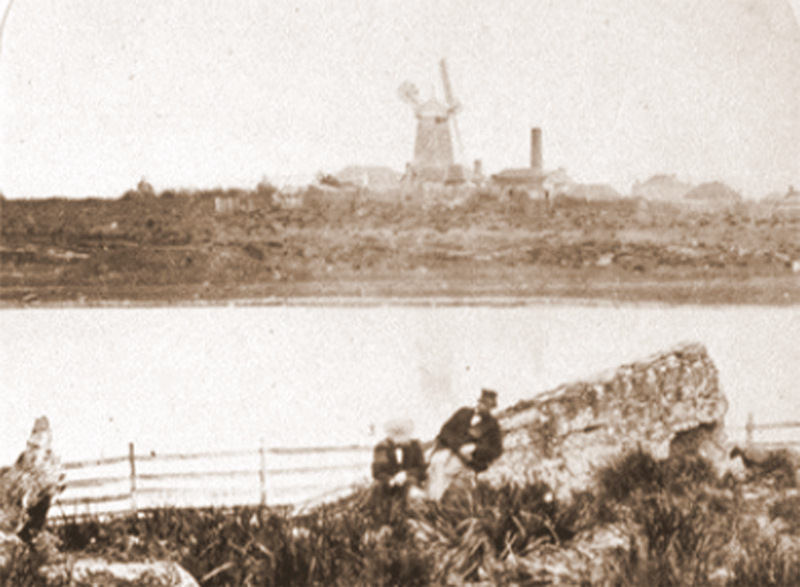
Distant view of the mill circa 1860

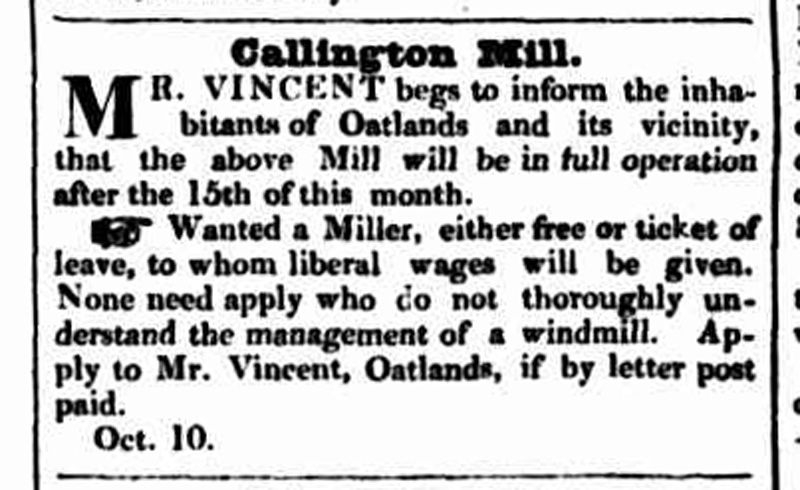
Advertisement for the opening of the mill in 1837

John Vincent was born in 1779 in Cornwall, England. In 1803 he married in London Susannah Rivers who was the same age. Over the next twenty years the couple had seven children while they were living in England. In 1823 at the age of 44 they decided to move to Tasmania. They immigrated with their children on the ship Elizabeth which arrived in Hobart in 1823. After they came to Tasmania they had two more children.

Over the next decade John became the proprietor of two licensed hotels, one in Bothwell called the Norwood Inn and one at Spring Hill called the London. His eldest son John Jubilee Vincent was also an innkeeper and ran the Lake Frederick Inn (later Lake Dulverton Inn) at Oatlands. This hotel still stands today.

In about 1836 at the age of 57 John decided to build the flour windmill at Oatlands. He used the best technology available in this project. It seems that he was very proud of this investment and he announced its opening in the newspaper in 1837. The advertisement is shown on the right. However his interest in the mill was short-lived and the following year he tried to rent it. He advertised it in the newspaper giving a good description of the mill and its surrounds. It said:

“THE Callington Mill, in the township of Oatlands, considered one of the first rate windmills in the country, and surpassed by none in its situation for business. Fitted up with two pair of good stones, (French burrs,) dressing and smut machines; together with a very respectable dwelling house, attached to which is a counting house and small store, washhouse and servants' bedroom. On the premises is a good granary, stable, chaise and cart houses, with piggeries and fowl house, and about two acres of garden ground in cultivation.
Also, to be let with the above are six Cottages, all occupied, and paying good rents.
Application to be made to Mr. John Vincent, the proprietor”

His attempt to let the mill appears to have been unsuccessful and two years later he sold it to his eldest son John Jubilee Vincent.

John Jubilee Vincent (John Vincent Junior) was born in England in 1809 and was fourteen when he came with his parents to Tasmania. During the early 1830s he was the pound keeper at Oatlands. and then for several years was an innkeeper as mentioned above. In about 1840 he bought the mill from his father. An advertisement appeared in the Hobart Colonial Times announcing his new ownership. In 1846 he installed a steam engine in the mill and again he publicised this with an advertisement in the newspaper. It stated that the prices for milling would be:

"For grinding………………6d per bushel.
"For grinding and dressing……………9d per bushel"

He operated the mill for about ten years but in the early 1850 when the gold rush began in Victoria he left Tasmania and moved to the goldfields. He died at Mountain Creek, Moonambel near Bendigo in 1862. In 1853 shortly after leaving Tasmania, John Jubilee Vincent sold the mill to Thomas Jillett

== Thomas Jillett ==
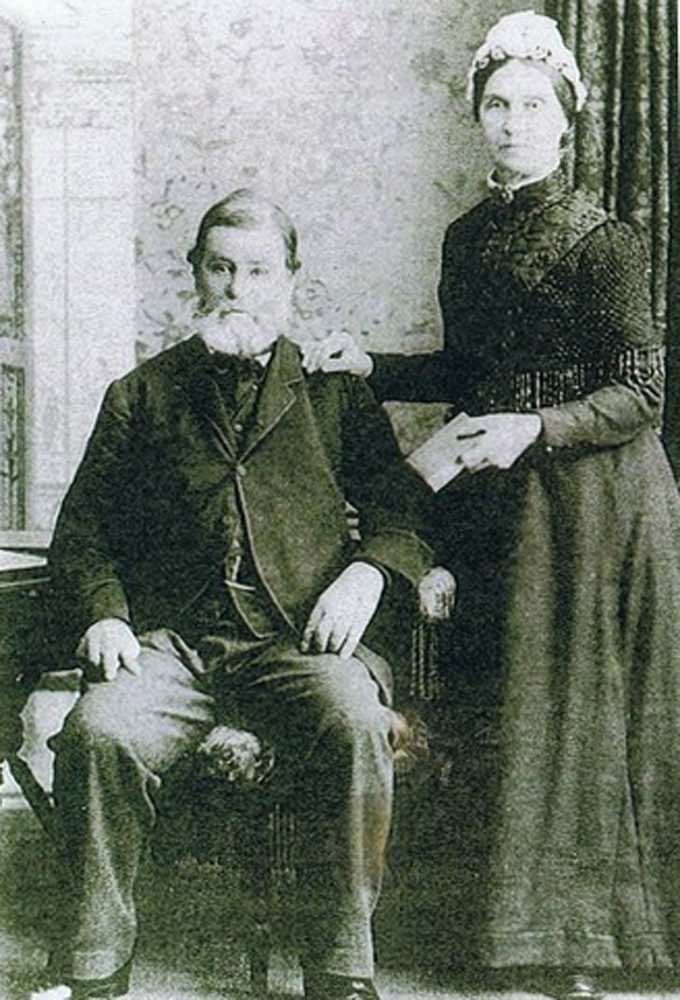
Thomas Jillett and his wife Mary Ann circa 1870.

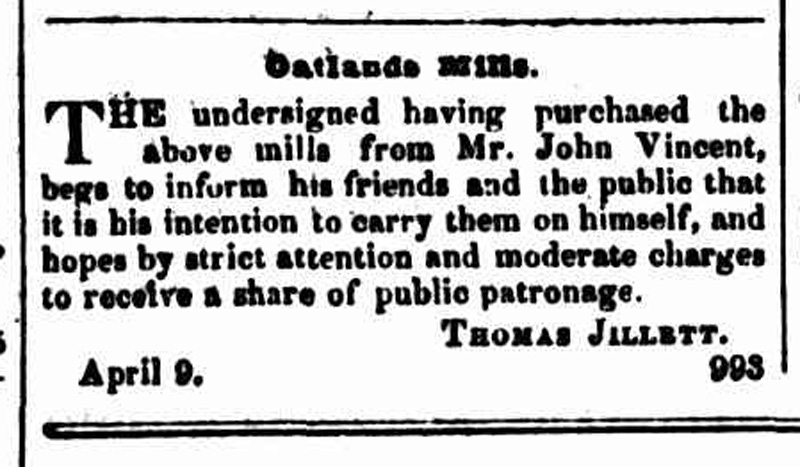
Notice of new ownership by Thomas Jillett in 1853.

Thomas Jillett was born in 1817 in Hobart Tasmania. He was the son of a convict named Robert Jillett and his wife Elizabeth Bradshaw, a free settler, who arrived in Sydney in 1799. In 1844 Thomas married Mary Ann Shone who was also the child of a convict. The couple lived at York Plains near Oatlands after they married. He was a successful sheep farmer before he purchased Callington Mill.

Thomas announced his new ownership of the mill in 1853 (see notice at left). He operated the mill for about ten years. At one time in the early 1860s he rented the mill to William Exton who left in 1862.

In 1863 Thomas Jillett sold the mill to his nephew John Bradshaw and a few years later left Tasmania and bought a sheep property in the Wimmera in Victoria. http://www.jillettfamily.com

== John Bradshaw ==
John Bradshaw was born in 1827 in Hobart. His father was William Bradshaw who was the brother of Thomas Jillett. In 1859 he married Maria Bacon who was born in England and had arrived as a free settler with her parents Martha and Denis Bacon in 1833.

It seems that before buying the mill in 1863 from his uncle Thomas Jillett, John managed it for him as he advertised for a stoker for the mill in 1854. After he bought the property he made some notable improvements. In 1870 he bought a silk dressing machine. In 1873 he installed a Boddington mill stone and a very descriptive account of this was given in the newspaper.

"Boddington is the name of a very superior mill stone recently imported and erected at the Oatlands steam-mill. Mr. John Bradshaw has, we believe, been the first to apply Boddington's patent in the colony, which has the reputation of not only doing the milling of wheat more efficaciously than the old " Burr," but of actually producing more flour to the bushel cereal. If the latter be the case, there is little doubt that Mr Bradshaw's enterprise will be amply rewarded by increased business; wind and steam power, and an improved silk dresser are now concentrated in the Oatlands mill, and with the abundant harvest reaped this year by the settlers in the district, should secure for its residents a full supply of the " staff of life " without the expense of carting the flour from either the northern or southern capital, as has been the case for the past two or three years".

In 1880 John Bradshaw advertised the sale of the mill and shortly after it was bought by Percy Douglas MacLaren.

== Percy Douglas MacLaren ==
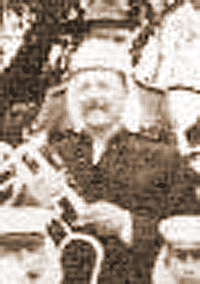
Percy Douglas MacLaren in 1906.

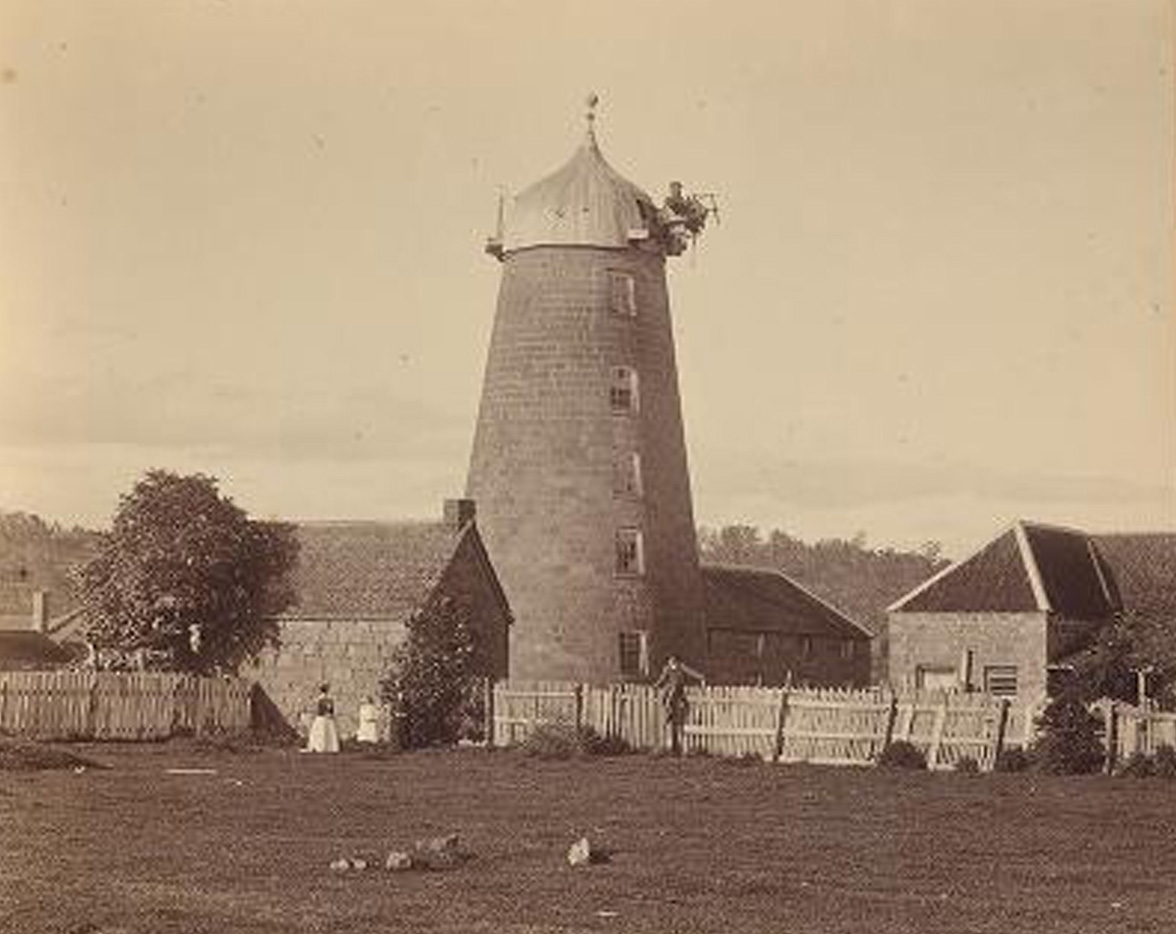
The mill shortly after the removal of the sails circa 1900.

Percy Douglas MacLaren was born in 1855. In 1877 he married Charlotte Shimmins in Oatlands. Percy bought Callington mill several years after their marriage and operated it until about 1892. While the couple lived in Oatlands Percy became bandmaster of the town band. In the early 1890s Percy left Oatlands and moved to Ulverstone where he again became bandmaster. He later became bandmaster of the Latrobe Band and a photo of him in this role is shown on the right.

Percy and Charlotte had twelve children while they were in Tasmania. Their eldest son also named Percy joined the Tasmanian Bushman Contingent to fight in the Boer War. Unfortunately he was killed in South Africa in 1901. There is a marble monument to him at Oatlands Town Hall. The Plaque reads.

"In Memoriam TROOPER PERCY DOUGLAS MACLAREN 1ST IMP: CONTGT: TASN: BUSHMEN BORN AT OATLANDS ON 25TH DECR. 1878. KILLED IN ACTION AT BRONKHORST SPRUIT. S.A. ON 22ND JANY. 1901.
BORNE 12 MILES IN AMBULANCE BY COMRADES AND BURIED (WRAPPED IN A UNION JACK) WITH MILITARY HONOURS AT BALMORAL.
"Your Son has paid a Soldier`s debt: "He only lived but `till he was a man: But like a man he died.
ERECTED BY RESIDENTS OF THE DISTRICT”

After Percy and Charlotte left Oatlands in about 1892 it appears that the mill ceased operating and not long after the sails were removed for safety reasons. A photo is shown on the left of the mill in about 1900 after the removal of the sails.

== Callington Mill today ==
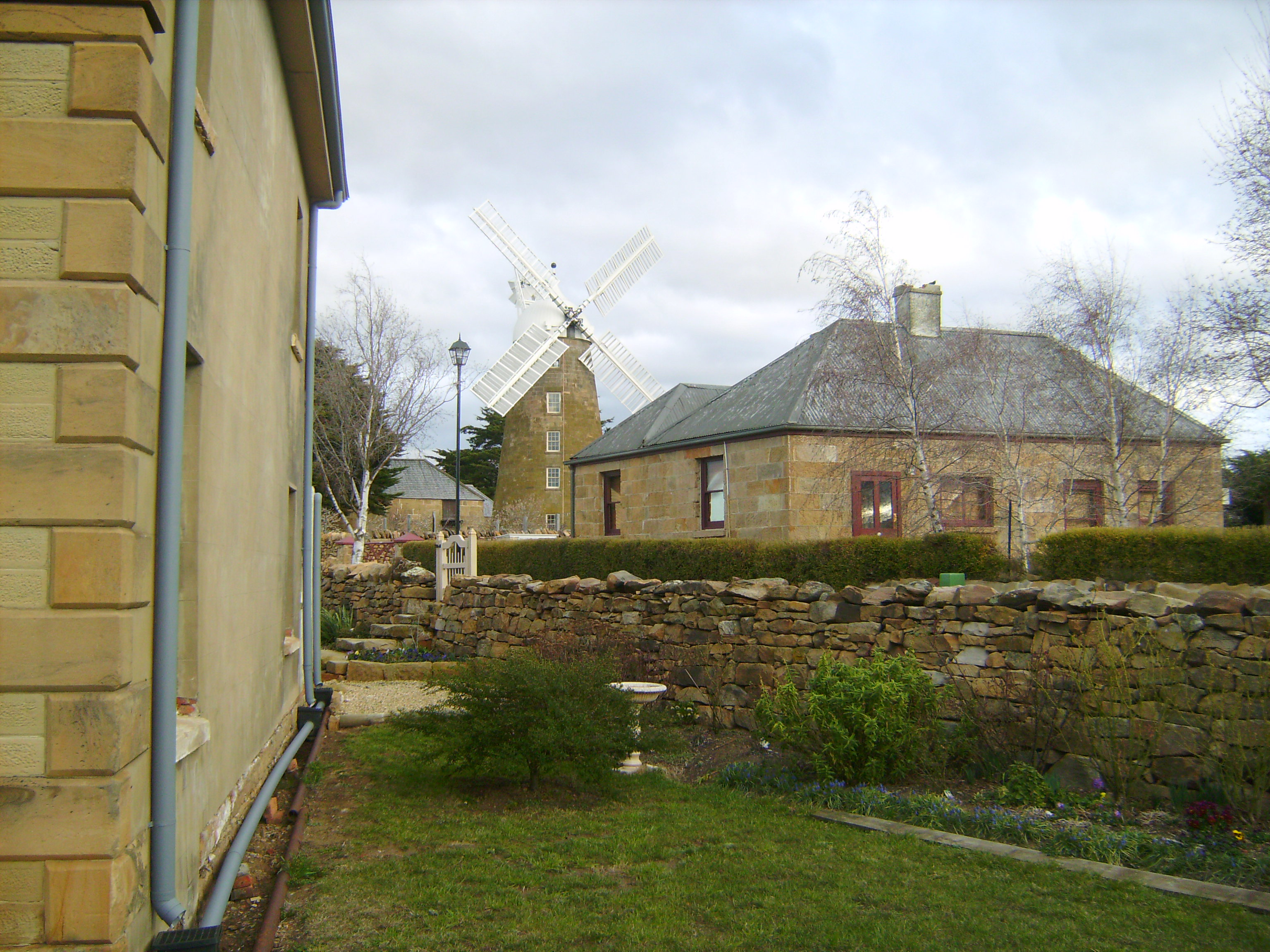
Callington Mill from High Street, Oatlands

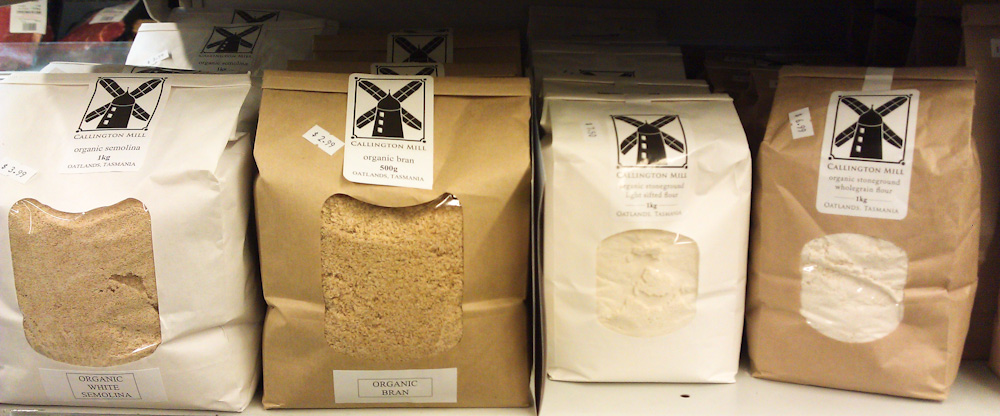
Flour made at the Callington Mill.

The Callington Mill, Mill Lane, Oatlands, Tasmania is now fully restored and operational, grinding locally sourced flour (see picture above) as it did over 120 years ago. It is the only working example of its type in the Southern Hemisphere.

Visitors are welcome to come and see the Mill and the Mill Precinct. 'Millers Way' guided tours of the Mill Precinct and Tower happen daily (10am-3pm, on every hour).

The mill is accompanied by the Oatlands Heritage Highway Visitor Centre. The mill featured on the Tasmanian ABC Television program Stateline on April 30, 2010.
