= Lemont, Tasmania =

Lemont Tasmania
- Coordinates: 42°17′50″S 147°39′36″E
- Population: 22 (2016 census)
- Postcode(s): 7120
- Location: 33 km (21 mi) E of Oatlands
- LGA(s): Northern Midlands, Southern Midlands
- Region: Central
- State electorate(s): Lyons
- Federal division(s): Lyons
Localities around Lemont:
York Plains	Ross	Tooms Lake
Pawtella	Lemont	Swanston, Tooms Lake
Andover	Stonehenge	Swanston

Lemont is a rural locality in the local government areas of Northern Midlands and Southern Midlands in the Central region of Tasmania. It is located about 33 kilometres (21 mi) east of the town of Oatlands. The 2016 census determined a population of 22 for the state suburb of Lemont.

== History ==
Lemont was gazetted as a locality in 1972.

== Geography ==
The locality is mostly open farming country, surrounded on three sides by timbered hills.

== Road infrastructure ==
The C305 route (Tooms Lake Road) enters from the north-west and runs through to the north-east before exiting. Route C307 (Lemont Road) enters from the west and runs south before exiting. Route C306 (Stonehouse Road) starts at an intersection with C307 on the western boundary and runs east and north through the locality to an intersection with C305, where it ends.
