= Levendale, Tasmania =

Levendale
- Town
- Coordinates: 42°32′0″S 147°34′0″E
- Country: Australia
- State: Tasmania
- LGA: Southern Midlands Council (72%), Glamorgan-Spring Bay Council (28%)
- Location: 53 km (33 mi) N of Hobart

Government
  - State electorate: Lyons
  - Federal division: Lyons

Population
  - Total: 129 (SAL 2021)
- Postcode: 7120

Levendale is a small settlement mostly in the Southern Midlands Council area 53 km north of Hobart, Tasmania, Australia, with about 28% in the Glamorgan-Spring Bay Council LGA, servicing the local farming community. Australian author and novelist Rachael Treasure resides in the area.

The settlement has a historic primary school, established 15 April 1901, which also serves as a community centre and focal point for the area. In 2008, facing the threat of closure with falling enrolments, the community rallied to increase the population of the area and save the school.

"Like it's the only thing Levendale has, we don't have a shop, a pub, or anything to fall back on, this is all we have, is our school, and it keeps the women supported and networking on behalf of the men as well, so it kind of flows through the whole community." said Rachael Treasure.

== History ==
=== Aboriginal occupation ===
The first people to inhabit the Levendale area were the Portmairremener, a band of the Oyster Bay Tribe who lived mainly around the mouth of the Prosser River. Each winter various bands of the Oyster Bay Tribe congregated around the coastal areas of Great Oyster Bay to harvest shellfish and marine vegetables until the end of July, when swans and ducks arrived in the lagoons and riverine areas to lay their eggs and raise their young. In August the bands moved up the Little Swanport and Prosser Rivers to the Eastern Marshes to hunt birds, kangaroos and wallabies.

As summer drew near the bands moved further west towards the Central Highlands, only to return to the coast as autumn approached. No doubt due to its prominence, the Aboriginal people would have used Mt. Hobbs as a reference point in their annual migrations.

In 1830, a large fire was kept burning on the summit of Brown Mountain as a point of direction for Governor Arthur's Black Line, that ill-fated attempt to drive the remaining Aboriginal people towards the Tasman Peninsula where they could be captured. This failure led Arthur in 1831 to appoint George Augustus Robinson to locate and bring in the remainder. During October, Robinson camped at Hobbs Lagoon and passed over the head of Bluff River.

=== European settlement ===
Due to the nearly impenetrable nature of the bush, Europeans did not settle at Levendale until the second half of the nineteenth century. Indeed, so dense was this bush that the area was originally known as "The Scrub". The first known settler was Henry Buscombe who selected 655 acres (2.65 km^{2}) of land at Levendale in 1842, calling his property Cutting Grass Marsh. In 1845, Henry's brother James purchased a 50-acre (200,000 m^{2}) block alongside his brother's property at the Cutting Grass Marsh.

Sometime between 1852 and 1868 a William Hodgson became the third person to take up land in the area when he purchased 709 acres (2.87 km^{2}) a Levenbanks. The assessment roll for 1858 shows John McConnon leasing 100 acres (0.40 km^{2}) near the Prosser River and in 1861 he was leasing 1,000 acres (4.0 km^{2}) from the Crown at Prosser River. By 1868 John and his son John William McConnon were leasing 820 acres (3.3 km^{2}) at Levenbanks and in 1870 John is recorded as owning 80 acres (32 ha) with a hut on the land.

Following the deaths of the Buscombe brothers (Henry 1844: James 1851) a William Brown leased the Buscombe's blocks in 1861. In 1873 Kele Balsley, a native of Denmark who had apparently jumped ship at the Saltworks near Little Swanport in 1865, purchased 24 acres (9.7 ha) of land at Levendale where he built a family home. The 1880s witnessed a rapid increase in settlement. Settlers taking up land at this time were: Colin Patterson and Michael Powell (1883), the brothers Montgomery (1886), Harold Burrows (1887) and William Crawford who built a house at Levendale in 1897. By the end of the century over two hundred people lived at Levendale.

The first task facing these early settlers was of course to carve out farms and homes from the dense bush – a thankless and difficult job. At first this work was carried out by hand, the settlers ring barking trees and cutting the undergrowth with axes and slash hook, the ash from the annual summer burnings used as fertilizer to help in the growth of grass and clover for cattle. The introduction of horses and bullocks at least provided some relief from the hard task of settlement.

The settlers' first homes were built from split timber with shingle roofs. As there was no running water, one of the main daily tasks was the carrying of water from nearby creeks, a responsibility often given to the youngest members of the family. As most homes had no bathroom, bathing was done by hip bather, the water heated in tins on open fires or wood stoves. Hurricane lamps and candles provided the only source of light. Of course the settlers of necessity had to be nearly self-sufficient in such a remote settlement. Straight-grained trees that split easily were used to provide palings and posts for buildings and fences; vegetable gardens were established, and each household produced its own milk, butter and eggs. Meat came from the farm's own livestock, and if that source of supply fell short then there was always the ever-present wallaby or rabbit to tide the family over.

The preservation of food was always a problem, but salting down vegetables and the use of wet sand packs for butter in summer ensured a reliable supply of household necessities. The purchase of essential items such as flour, tea, sugar and salt meant a fairly arduous journey to either Oatlands or Sorell every three months.

Whilst most of the young men worked on the farms, either their own or a neighbor's, many traveled around the district shearing sheep or working as farm hands for the wealthier farmers. Sawmilling also was an important part of the area's history. This industry also supplied local men and boys with employment. The earliest mills belonged to the Campbell, Barker and McConnon families. These were steam engine operated and supplied timber for many of the local homes and buildings. The only sawmill still operating today is run by Alf and Barry McConnon.

It was always possible to make a few shillings on the side after the government introduced a bounty scheme for trapping and killing Tasmanian tigers (thylacines) in 1888, with a number of claims being made upon the government by settlers in the Levendale area.

Young women not employed at home usually found work as housemaids or a shop assistants until they married and had their own families; families that not uncommonly ran to thirteen or more children. The continued growth of Levendale towards the end of the 1890s led to local demands for improved services to cater for the growing needs of the community. High on the list of priorities was a local school.

=== Levendale Primary School ===
Following strong representations from the Reverend T. W. Pitt, Church of England Minister at Spring Bay and the Hon. W. W. Perkins. M.L.C. the government agreed to build a school at Levendale. The decision to build the school seems also to have inspired the community to look for an appropriate name for the town, after all "The Scrub" State School must have had a peculiar ring to it, one that doubtless inspired little confidence.

Consequently, the opening of the school on 15 April 1901 provided the local community with the chance to hold a public meeting to decide upon a new name for the area. That meeting agreed upon the name Levendale, the first part of which was derived from the name of one of the oldest farms in the district, Levenbanks, belonging to Mr. V Hodgson, and later Thomas McConnon. And so the school opened with Mr. W. Duthie appointed first teacher in charge and with William Crawford and Frank McConnon registered as the first of what would eventually prove to be over 1000 students who would pass through the doors.

As with most small country towns the new school offered not only a chance for and educations for the local children but a focal point for the whole community, many of the local events being organized around the school.

In 2007 Levendale Primary School is still the focal point for the whole community, boasting a student population at 23, community library, enthusiastic history group, zero to four learning program, playgroup, prekindergarten and many other activities. With the school under threat of closure in 2008 due to low student numbers author and local resident Rachael Treasure proposed to the community that vacant farmhouses be put up for rent of $1 per week to attract more families to the area. The offer attracted interest from around Australia, New Zealand and as far afield as Japan and Singapore.
