= Parattah =

Parattah Tasmania
- Coordinates: 42°21′S 147°24′E
- Population: 147 (2021 census)
- Postcode(s): 7120
- Elevation: 431 m (1,414 ft)
- Location: 90 km (56 mi) N of Hobart; 125 km (78 mi) SSE of Launceston; 6 km (4 mi) SE of Oatlands
- LGA(s): Southern Midlands Council
- State electorate(s): Lyons
- Federal division(s): Lyons
Mean max temp	Mean min temp	Annual rainfall
15.5 °C; 60 °F	5.0 °C; 41 °F	548.0 mm 21.6 in

Parattah is a small township in Tasmania, located approximately 6 kilometres (4 mi) southeast of the town of Oatlands. At the 2021 census, Parattah had a population of 147.

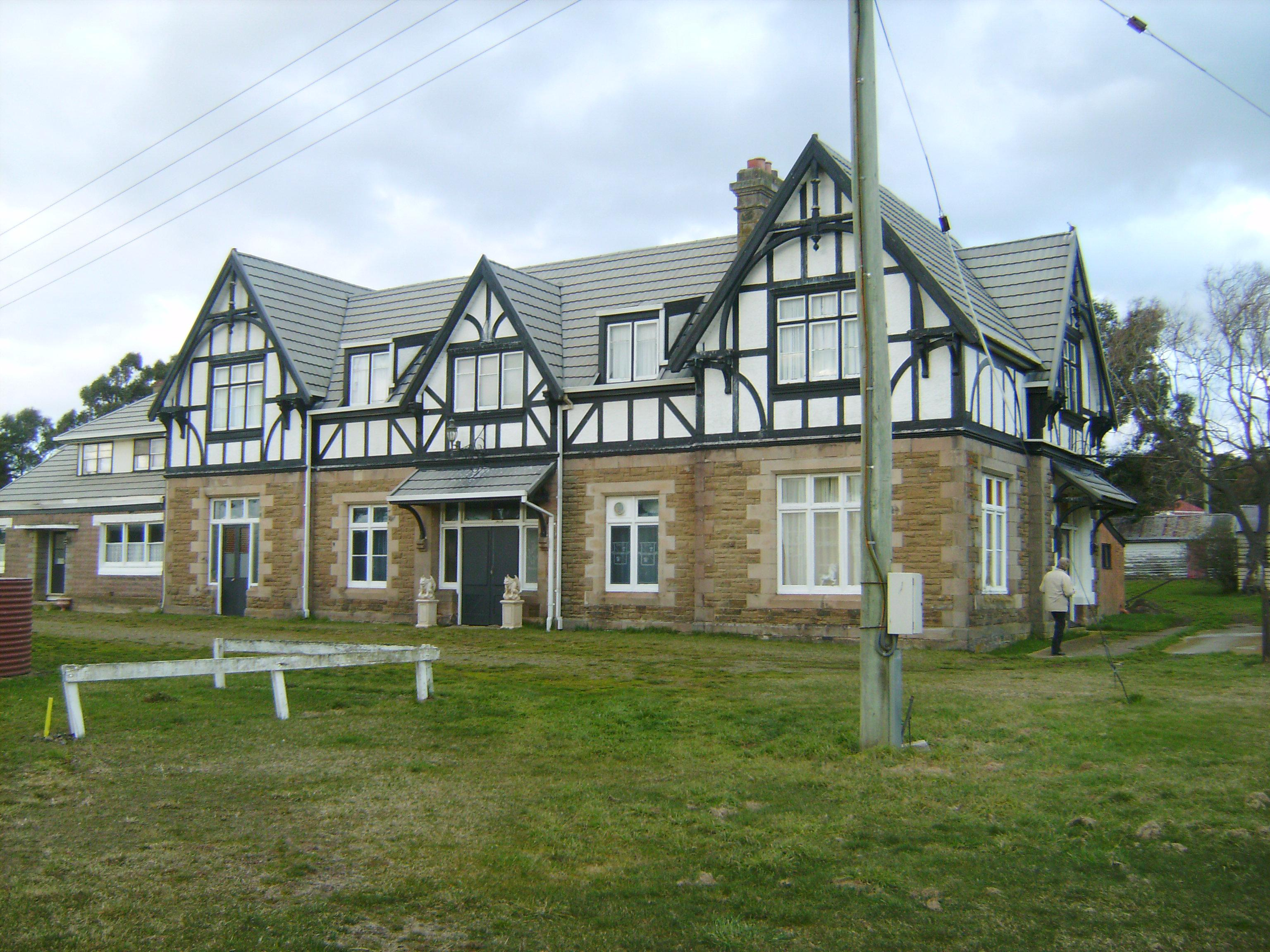
Parattah Hotel, built in 1889

The area is home to about 100 families, and contains many historic buildings, such as a farmhouse which was once home to Hudson Fysh, one of the founders of Qantas, and a historic railway station. The main street contains a number of attractive dwellings dating from the town's heyday, some of which are currently undergoing restoration. The village retains the original general store, the impressive Tudor style Parattah Hotel and a number of historic churches.

The first post office serving the township opened 1 June 1879 and was originally named Oatlands Station until it was renamed Parattah with effect from 1 January 1882. It was located at the railway station (which, while at Parattah, was actually the official Station for Oatlands) until 8 January 1914. The postmistress from 1946 to 1966 was Mary Fisher. She was succeeded by her daughter, Vera Fisher, who retired in March 1977 and who has been claimed to be a descendant of the postal reformer Sir Rowland Hill. The town also has a public telephone, which was removed in July 2009, but after much local outcry, was restored one month later.

== Parattah Junction ==
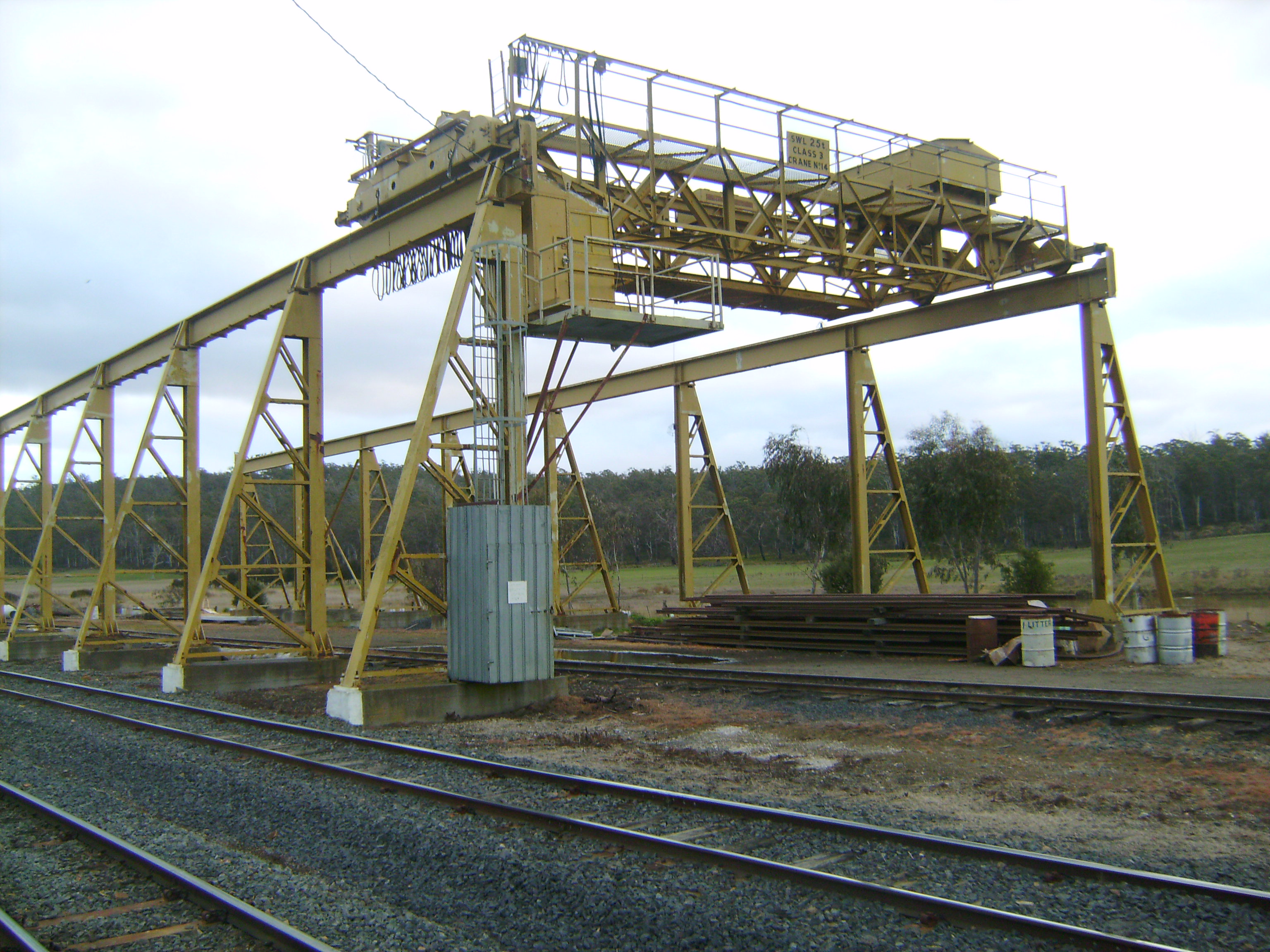
Loading crane at Parattah station

Parattah was once known as Parattah Junction due to the former Oatlands railway line, which branched off towards Oatlands from this area. Today, the railway station serves no passenger traffic, with the last passenger visits occurring in the early 2000s on heritage rail tours.

The railway in Parattah served as an important point on the South line from Hobart to Launceston, being the halfway stopping point for the Tasman Limited, and the terminus for suburban and inter-regional passenger services on the Tasmanian Government Railways. Within the timetables, Parattah was allocated as a station where refreshments could be purchased, or where train, taxi or airplane connections could be arranged. Because of the high volume of traffic the station received, it was the location of a coaling stage and water refilling station for steam locomotives, a wye for turning locomotives around, as well as sidings and a loading crane for freight and goods traffic. Whilst not a part of the system nowadays, the sidings and loading crane can still be seen today.

The station building itself has been restored, with a small museum housed there, and is now situated beside a public picnic reserve. Parattah Junction remains the highest elevated station on the Tasmanian rail network, and originally housed the town's post office until 1914.
