= Highlands Lake Road =

Road in Tasmania, Australia

Highlands Lake Road Tasmania

General information
- Type: Highway
- Length: 152 km (94 mi)
- Route number(s): A5; Deloraine — Melton Mowbray
- Former route number: State Route 5

Major junctions
- North end: Bass Highway; Deloraine, Tasmania
- Meander Valley Road; Marlborough Highway; Poatina Road; Hollow Tree Road
- South end: Midland Highway; Melton Mowbray, Tasmania

Location(s)
- Major settlements: Brandum, Liawenee, Wihareja, Steppes, Bothwell, Apsley

Highway system
- Highways in Australia; National Highway • Freeways in Australia; Highways in Tasmania

Highlands Lake Road, or A5, is a road in Tasmania. Although still known as the Lake Highway the official title of the road was changed in 2001 to Highland Lakes Road.

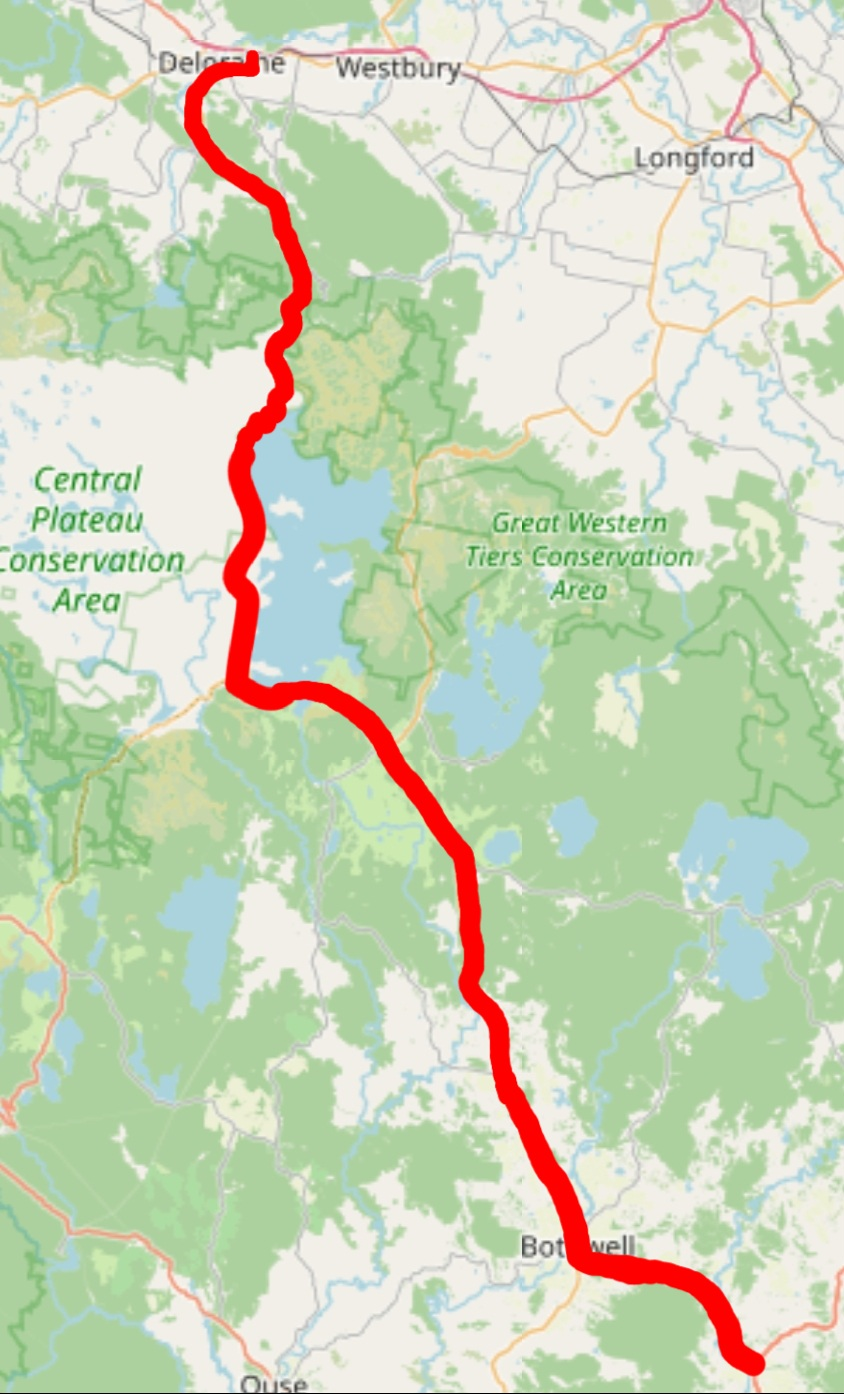
Map of Highlands Lake Road

The road is one of the least used in Tasmania, except during the summer months when the road is used by Great Lake commuters. The portion of the road on and near the Great Lake in Tasmania's Central plateau, averages a height of about 1000 metres. During the winter months it is sometimes snowed under.

== Route description ==
Highlands Lake Road branches off the Midland Highway at Melton Mowbray in southern Tasmania and continues for 152 kilometres, with Bothwell being the main town of any size en route, terminating in Deloraine. Two major roads that branch from Highlands Lake Road is the Marlborough Highway (which connects to the A10 Lyell Highway), and Poatina Road (B51), which leaves Highlands Lake Road in the north of the Steppes and plunges steeply over the Great Western Tiers to the former hydro-electric construction village of Poatina.

== Upgrades ==
Until recently it was the only major A-road in Australia that was partially unsealed, works to seal the road were completed in April 2019. In 2026, roadworks were completed fixing and replacing fences and improving safety.

== See also ==
- Highways in Australia
- List of highways in Tasmania
