= Oatlands, Tasmania =

Oatlands
- Town
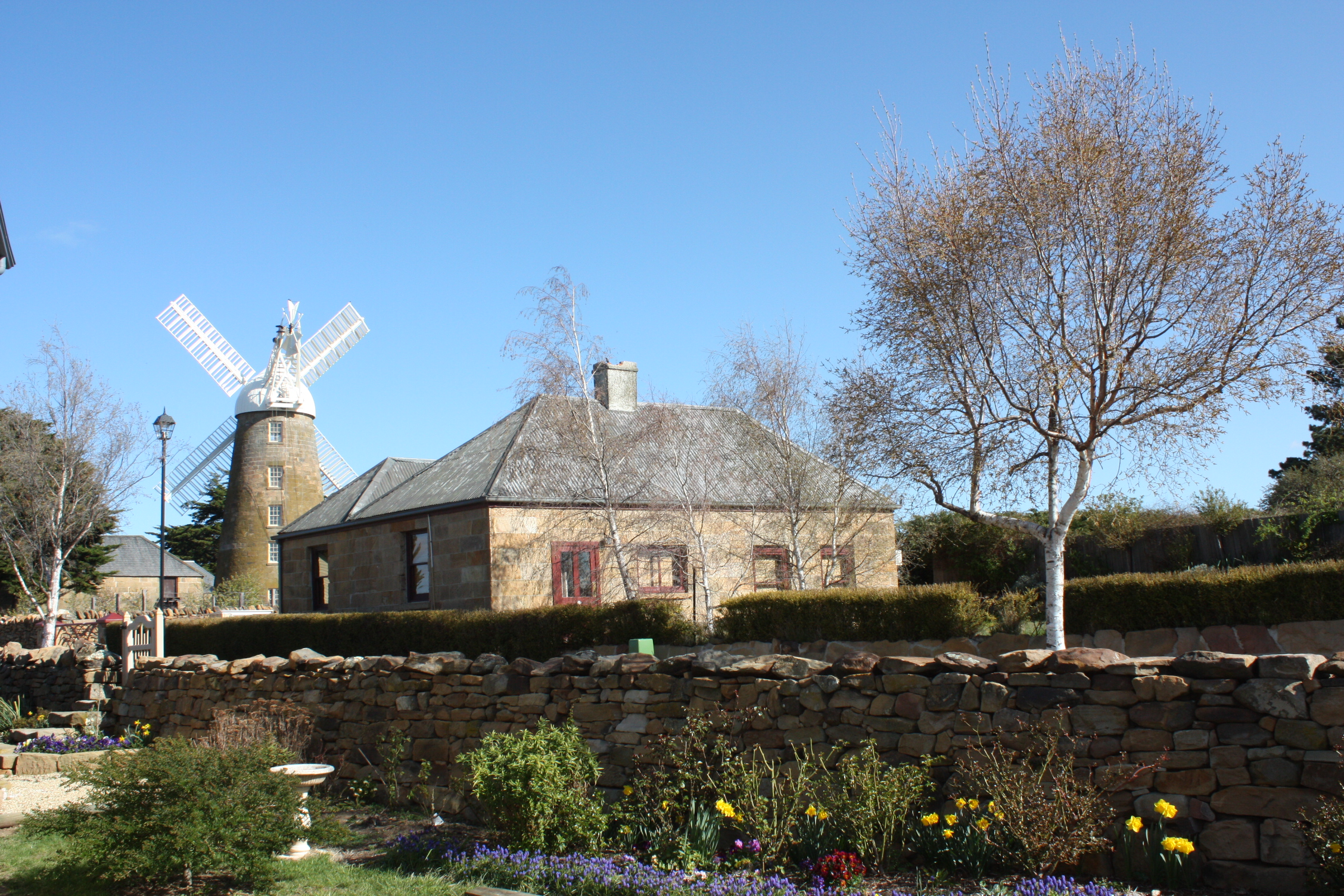
- View of Callington mill.

- Coordinates: 42°18′00″S 147°22′14″E
- Country: Australia
- State: Tasmania
- LGA: Southern Midlands Council
- Location: 84 km (52 mi) N of Hobart; 115 km (71 mi) S of Launceston; 50 km (31 mi) S of Campbell Town

Government
  - State electorate: Lyons
  - Federal division: Lyons
- Elevation: 406 m (1,332 ft)

Population
  - Total: 728 (2021 census)
- Postcode: 7120
- Mean max temp: 15.5 °C (59.9 °F)
- Mean min temp: 5.0 °C (41.0 °F)
- Annual rainfall: 549.1 mm (21.62 in)

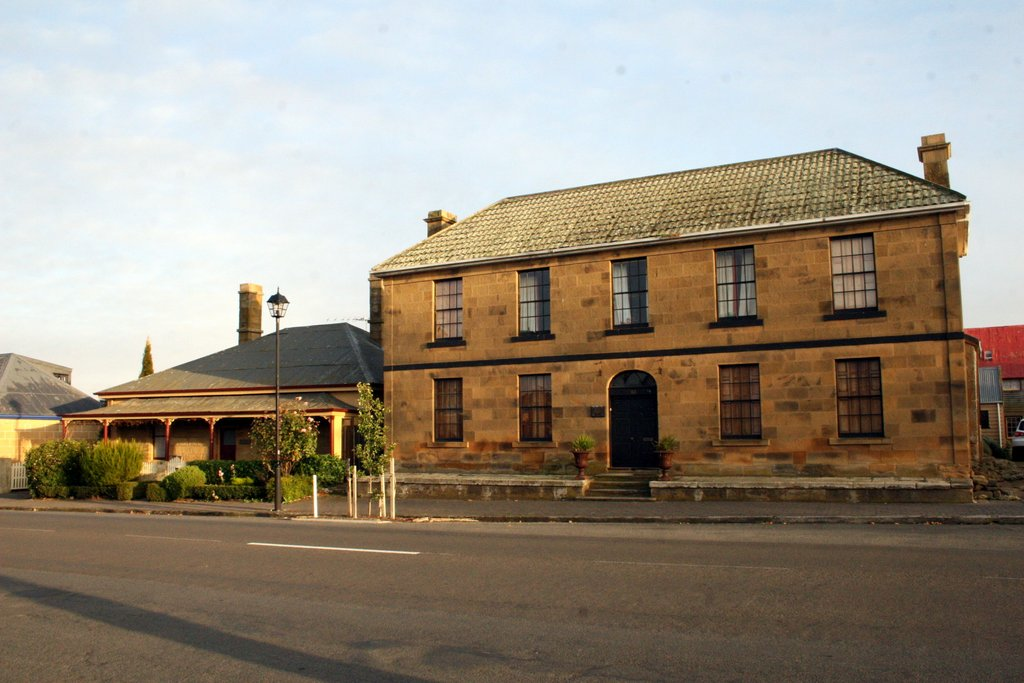
Oatlands Coach House, typical sandstone building

Oatlands is a historical village on the shores of Lake Dulverton in the centre of Tasmania, Australia. Oatlands is located 84 kilometres north of Hobart and 115 kilometres south of Launceston on the Midland Highway. At the 2021 census, Oatlands had a population of 728.

Oatlands has the largest number of colonial sandstone buildings in any town in Australia, many of which were built by convict labour. It is the largest town in the Southern Midlands Council area and is surrounded by agricultural land.

== History ==
Oatlands is one of Tasmania's oldest settlements and was named by Governor Macquarie after an English town in the county of Surrey in 1821. It was developed as a military base for the control and management of convicts because of its central location between Hobart and Launceston. Convicts were assigned to nearby farms and properties and also worked on public buildings, roads and bridges.

Oatlands Post Office opened on 1 June 1832.

Much of the Black War between the colonists and the First Nations landowners took place in the surrounding districts.

Landmarks in Oatlands include the Callington Mill and St Paul’s Church. The mill was built in 1837 and was restored to working order during June/July 2010, and the Catholic Church was designed by Augustus Welby Pugin, the father of Gothic Revival architecture.

Oatlands was the home of the ex-convict Solomon Blay, Tasmania's most feared hangman.

For some years after 1848, Oatlands was the place of exile of the Irish nationalist leader Kevin Izod O'Doherty, where his stone cottage still stands. The Oatlands railway line connected Oatlands with Parattah on the South line. The railway opened on 13 May 1885 and closed on 10 June 1949.

The Midland Highway ceased to pass through the town when the Oatlands Bypass opened in April 1985.. This bypass, along with the 1990s Tasmanian economy slump and a Tasmanian Midlands rural drought, greatly impacted Oatlands and its relative prosperity in the 20th century.

The Oatlands Court House is an historic Georgian building in Oatlands. Built by convict labour in 1829, the Oatlands Court House is the oldest supreme court house in rural Australia and the oldest building in Oatlands. The building was originally constructed as a combined Chapel and Police Office. It was purchased by the National Trust in 1977.

Oatlands has 87 original sandstone buildings along the town’s main street. The stone for their construction was quarried along the shores of Lake Dulverton. Some of the more significant buildings include the Oatlands gaol (1835), Commissariat’s store and watch house (1830s) and officers’ quarters (1830s). The Callington Mill (1837) is the only working example of a Lincolnshire windmill in Australia.

== Climate ==
Climate data for Oatlands Post Office
Month	Jan	Feb	Mar	Apr	May	Jun	Jul	Aug	Sep	Oct	Nov	Dec	Year
Record high °C (°F)	37.0 (98.6)	39.0 (102.2)	34.0 (93.2)	25.7 (78.3)	22.8 (73.0)	17.2 (63.0)	16.4 (61.5)	19.5 (67.1)	28.3 (82.9)	28.6 (83.5)	32.2 (90.0)	35.6 (96.1)	39.0 (102.2)
Mean daily maximum °C (°F)	21.7 (71.1)	21.8 (71.2)	19.5 (67.1)	16.0 (60.8)	12.5 (54.5)	10.1 (50.2)	9.4 (48.9)	10.6 (51.1)	12.8 (55.0)	15.2 (59.4)	17.5 (63.5)	19.5 (67.1)	15.5 (59.9)
Mean daily minimum °C (°F)	8.7 (47.7)	8.6 (47.5)	7.5 (45.5)	5.6 (42.1)	3.4 (38.1)	1.6 (34.9)	1.1 (34.0)	1.8 (35.2)	3.1 (37.6)	4.5 (40.1)	6.1 (43.0)	7.7 (45.9)	5.0 (41.0)
Record low °C (°F)	−1.5 (29.3)	−3.2 (26.2)	−2.2 (28.0)	−4.4 (24.1)	−7.1 (19.2)	−11.7 (10.9)	−7.4 (18.7)	−7.4 (18.7)	−5.6 (21.9)	−6.0 (21.2)	−2.9 (26.8)	−1.7 (28.9)	−11.7 (10.9)
Average precipitation mm (inches)	42.9 (1.69)	38.1 (1.50)	39.3 (1.55)	45.2 (1.78)	43.0 (1.69)	48.3 (1.90)	42.8 (1.69)	45.3 (1.78)	42.5 (1.67)	53.3 (2.10)	50.4 (1.98)	54.1 (2.13)	547.8 (21.57)
Average precipitation days	8.8	8.3	10.0	12.0	14.5	15.3	16.9	16.9	14.7	14.2	12.6	11.2	155.4
Average afternoon relative humidity (%)	46	47	51	60	69	71	72	66	62	57	55	53	59
Source: Bureau of Meteorology
