= Edward Lord =

Early figure in the history of Van Diemen's Land

- Born: 15 June 1781; Pembroke, Wales
- Died: 14 September 1859 (aged 78); London, England
- Spouse: Maria Lord
- Relatives: Sir John Owen, 1st Baronet (brother)

Edward Lord (15 June 1781 – 14 September 1859) was a figure in the early history of the colony of Van Diemen's Land. He was a Royal Marine, landowner, pastoralist and commandant of the Hobart Town (southern) colony from March to July 1810.

Edward Lord was born on 15 June 1781 in Pembroke, Wales. He was the third son of Joseph Lord and his wife Corbetta Owen. He was gazetted as a second lieutenant of marines on 12 September 1798, stationed at Portsmouth.

In 1803, Lord was in the expedition led by David Collins to establish a settlement on Port Phillip (near the present-day Sorrento). The settlement was abandoned in 1804, and the party moved instead to establish a settlement on the River Derwent which became Hobart. He is credited with having built the first private house in Hobart Town.

In February 1804, Lord was granted sick leave to return to England, but in fact spent 6 months in Sydney and returned with a fledgling flock of sheep. He was appointed first lieutenant on 3 December 1805 and granted 100 acres (40 ha) of land in January 1806. By October, he was the largest stock-ownerin Van Diemen's Land. He visited Sydney (still the capital of the colony) again in April 1808 and returned with appointment as a magistrate, and a grant of 500 acres (200 ha). Soon after his return, he married Maria Riseley, a convict he had brought back from Sydney, on 8 October 1808 after he had secured her pardon.

Lieutenant-governor David Collins died unexpectedly and Lord took charge of the colony as commandant and acting lieutenant-governor but failed to be confirmed as the next lieutenant-governor. Instead, he was given leave to return to England. While there, he resigned his commission in the marines, and used the influence of his brother John Owen, M.P. to receive another land grant of 3,000 acres (1,200 ha). He took half of this near Sydney and the other half to establish the Orielton estate in Van Diemen's Land which eventually grew to 3,500 acres (1,400 ha). He returned to Hobart in March 1813 with £30,000 worth of goods, in his own brig, the James Hay.

Lord had a thorny relationship with the government in Sydney, but despite warnings, generally got on well with the lieutenant-governors in Hobart. He returned to England in 1819 and sought redress for ill treatment from Governor Macquarie, the charges were refuted and he was granded another 3,000 acres (1,200 ha). He bought the Caroline and returned to Hobart in November 1820 with a large cargo of merchandise. He exchanged a few acres in Hobart for 7,000 acres (2,800 ha) inland and established Lawrenny on the Clyde River. He was said to be the richest man in Van Diemen's Land, with 6000 cattle, 7000 sheep, 30,000 acres (12,000 ha) of land and three ships.

Lord returned to England in 1822 on the chartered Royal George and appears to have been based in England from then on, but still returned to Hobart several more times, the last (and seventh) in 1846-47 aged 65 years. On his visit in 1824, he won a case against Charles Rowcroft for criminal conversation with his wife. His wife Maria managed their business in Van Diemens Land, and he had several children in England as well. He died in London on 14 September 1859 with his English estate valued at £2000, plus property in Van Diemens Land. He was survived by a son and two daughters from his marriage, and three sons and a daughter in England.
