= Horton Park Golf Club =

Golf club in Australia

Coordinates: 26.65791°S 153.09139°E

Club information
- Tournaments: Australian Open

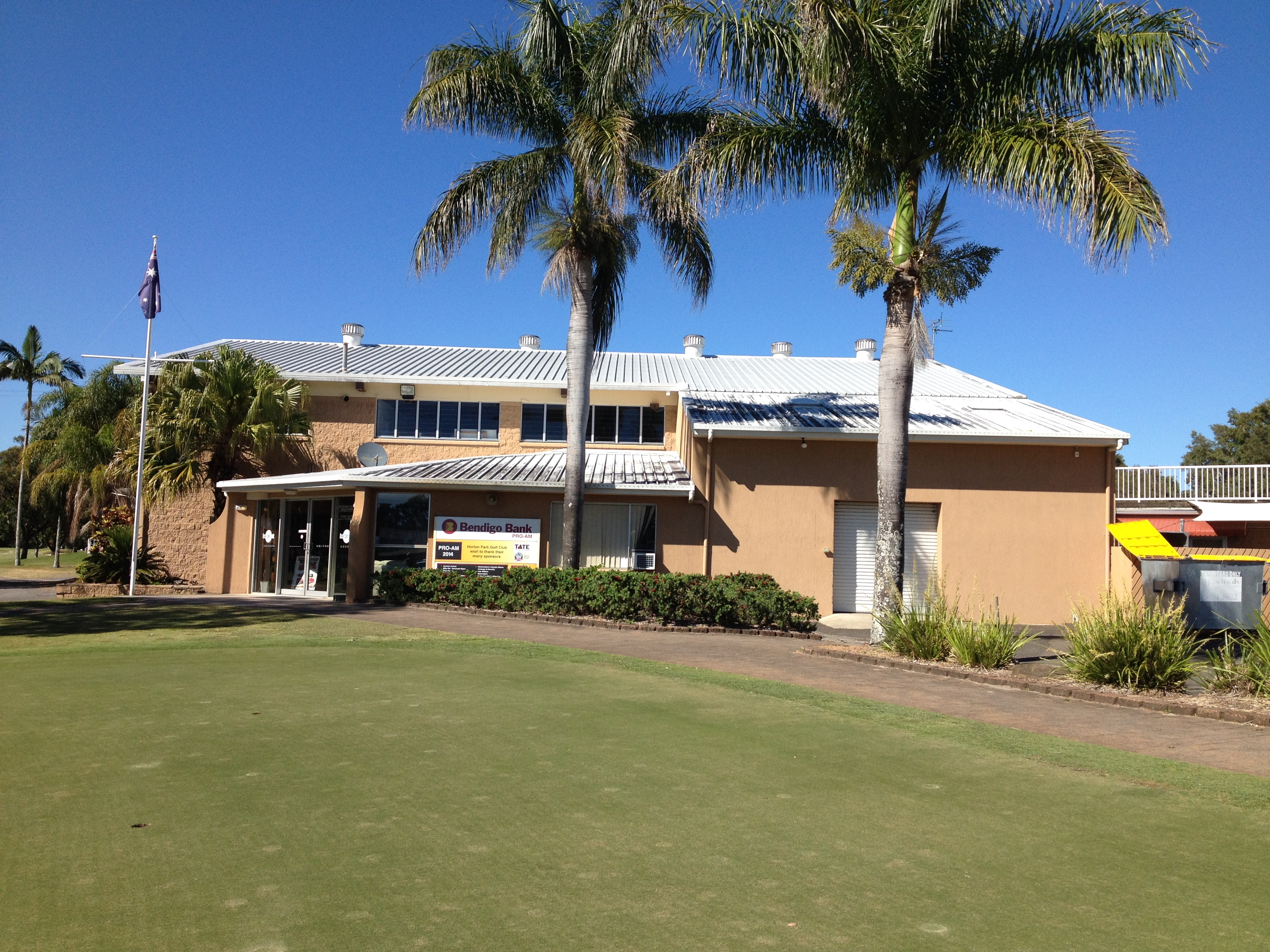
Clubhouse facing North

The Horton Park Golf Club was the only golf club located in central Maroochydore on the Sunshine Coast in South East Queensland, Australia. The club was situated next to Sunshine Plaza shopping centre and was established in 1950. On the 20 July 1950, the minutes of the first meeting were signed by the President Mr W Coffey. The first building, a shed and an outhouse were purchased and erected in 1952.

After the council reclaimed the land, the club moved to a new site in Bli Bli, on the north bank of the Maroochy River, and is now renamed as the Maroochy River Golf Club. Horton Park is being redeveloped by the council as a new central business district and residential area called SunCentral.

== Course ==
The Horton Park course had 18 championship holes with a flood lit driving range. Scorecard The Championship course scorecard is as follows. Please note that all measurements are from the Blue Championship Tees.

| Hole # | Par | Metres | Yards |
|---|---|---|---|
| 1 | 3 | 190 | 207 |
| 2 | 5 | 453 | 495 |
| 3 | 4 | 386 | 422 |
| 4 | 3 | 180 | 196 |
| 5 | 5 | 468 | 511 |
| 6 | 4 | 410 | 448 |
| 7 | 3 | 165 | 180 |
| 8 | 5 | 466 | 509 |
| 9 | 4 | 310 | 339 |
| Out | 36 | 3028 | 3307 |

| Hole # | Par | Metres | Yards |
|---|---|---|---|
| 10 | 4 | 326 | 356 |
| 11 | 4 | 259 | 283 |
| 12 | 5 | 533 | 582 |
| 13 | 4 | 351 | 383 |
| 14 | 5 | 476 | 520 |
| 15 | 4 | 422 | 461 |
| 16 | 3 | 179 | 195 |
| 17 | 3 | 104 | 113 |
| 18 | 4 | 300 | 328 |
| In | 36 | 2950 | 3221 |
| Out | 36 | 3028 | 3307 |
| Total | 72 | 5978 | 6528 |

== History ==
The club was officially opened by Mr M.R. Hornibrook the President of the Queensland Golf union ( now known as Golf Queensland) in May 1956.

== See also ==
- Golf in Australia
- Sport in Queensland
