= Hollow Tree, Tasmania =

Hollow Tree
- Town
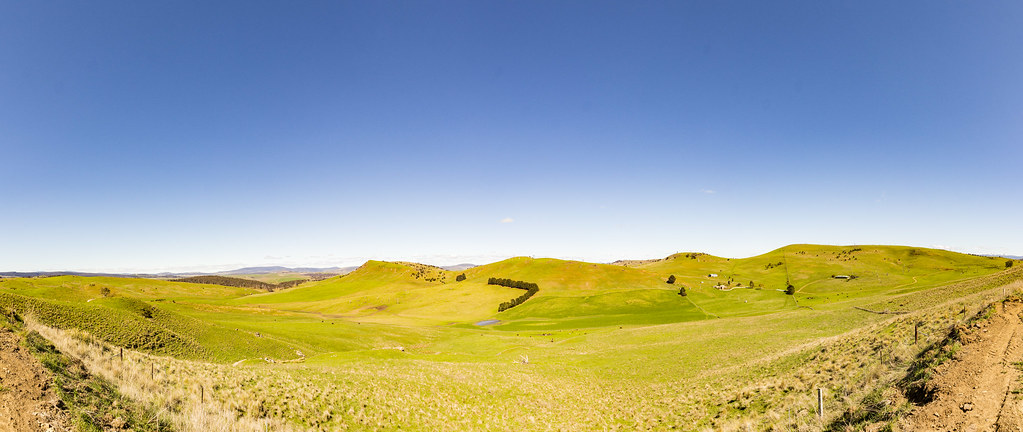
- Landscape of Hollow Tree, Tasmania

- Coordinates: 42°29′08″S 146°56′19″E
- Country: Australia
- State: Tasmania
- Region: Central
- LGA: Central Highlands
- Location: 17 km (11 mi) NE of Hamilton

Government
  - State electorate: Lyons
  - Federal division: Lyons

Population
  - Total: 33 (2021 census)
- Postcode: 7140
Localities around Hollow Tree
Bothwell	Bothwell	Bothwell
Ouse	Hollow Tree	Dysart
Hamilton	Hamilton	Pelham

Hollow Tree is a rural locality in the local government area of Central Highlands in the Central region of Tasmania. It is located about 17 kilometres (11 mi) north-east of the town of Hamilton and about 16 kilometres (9.9 mi) south-west of the town of Bothwell in one of Tasmania's key pastoral districts. The 2021 census determined a population of 33 for the locality.

== History ==
Hollow Tree is located within the country of the Big River nation. They actively resisted the takeover of their land by the British, notably during the period 1828–1830. The terrain in the valley of the Clyde River was especially conducive to farmhouse raids. The tree-covered ridges provided cover for raiding parties, while the narrow width of the valleys made it possible for them to cross the cleared ground and reach farm houses before settlers could react. The valleys also isolated each settler from their neighbour over the ridge, enabling Aboriginal raiding parties to create a local numerical superiority against a particular farm.

It was gazetted as a locality in 1959, though the area became known as Hollow Tree from the early 1800s.

The first Europeans to live in the area were shepherds, or stockmen, overseeing livestock belonging to owners who mainly resided in Hobart Town or the New Norfolk district. The first land grants were three small acreages granted in 1821 - 50 acres granted to Patrick McCarthy (who had arrived as a convict in 1804), 50 acres to John Barnes (who had arrived 1808) and 60 acres to his step-son James Holland (aka Barnes, who also arrived in 1808). Only Patrick McCarthy settled on his land grant at Hollow Tree. The only other European in the district to occupy a land grant at that time was James Robertson. Robertson, who also arrived in the district in 1822, named his 1,000 acre grant 'Katrine Vale' (Robertson received an additional 500 acres in 1824).

A large land grant of 1,500 acres was issued to Captain William Langdon in 1823, however, he did not occupy his grant until late 1835, when his wife Anne and daughter Jane also came to Van Diemen's Land. Also in 1823, an even larger grant of 2,000 acres was issued to siblings Sarah and Joseph Bradbury, who had arrived from London the previous year with their mother. The Bradbury's eventually occupied the land grant later in the 1820s, and by 1832 had constructed a substantial two-storey sandstone home, later known as 'Strathborough' and now known simply as 'Hollow Tree House'.

In August 1828, the largest parcel of land to be granted at Hollow Tree was issued to retired Royal Navy Lieutenant Henry Boden Torlesse, who received 2,460 acres, which he named 'Rathmore'. In 1830, Torlesse asked to exchange his land grant for one closer to the protection of the town of Hamilton, after being raided by members of the indigenous Big River nation. Despite this, he arranged the construction of a grand sandstone house at the property. Torlesse and his family appear to have moved into their new house at Hollow Tree in about November 1831, but remained there only a short time, relocating to Hamilton in early 1833, where Torlesse was the local Police Magistrate.

Land grants at Hollow Tree were progressively issued by the colonial authorities until, by 1831, the district was entirely in private hands. Many owners, however, remained absent and leased their land to others.

== Architecture ==
Hollow Tree has several architecturally and historically significant buildings, in Georgian and Gothic revival styles, dating from the 19th century.

=== Llanberis ===
Formerly Calton Hill, Llanberis is a two-storey Gothic revival house built before 1875, with the twin gables being added in about 1890. It is constructed primarily of sandstone and has a timber verandah on three sides. It was built in front of an older cottage on the site. The house is prominently located on a small knoll and is highly visible from the road between Bothwell and Hamilton.

In 1915, the Hallet brothers William, Frederick, and Isaac purchased the property, with Isaac later taking Llanberis.

=== Montacute ===
Captain William Langdon established a single storey, slate roofed, sandstone homestead which he named 'Montacute' after the village where he was born in Somerset.

In 1830, Langdon had captained the ship Thomas Laurie from England to Van Diemen's Land, on board was John Glover, who was to become one of the first landscape painters in Australia and who sketched Langdon in one of his sketchbooks. In 1838, Glover painted Montacute. The painting shows the main house, secondary buildings, and the surrounding wall within the wider landscape. Montacute was one of three colonial homesteads painted by Glover in 1837–38, including Ratho in Bothwell and Cawood in Ouse. The paintings capture vividly the isolation of the properties, surrounded by wilderness, while also suggesting the success of their owners in running them productively. Art curator and author David Hansen has written of these three paintings show what was a theme in Glover's works: "the triumph of colonial order in the unruly antipodean Paradise" and are among his most beautiful depictions of the Australian countryside.

While the house itself is now an abandoned ruin, Langdon, a devoted supporter of the Church of England, also built a church on the property, St James' in 1856–57, which still stands in good condition, with services conducted there occasionally. St James' was consecrated on the 11th of November 1858, in a ceremony led by Tasmania's first bishop, Francis Nixon, and was described in an article in The Courier:

“The church is in the Gothic style, beautiful in its simplicity, as churches should be. The old church porch and the fine old arched doorway have their proper places. The windows are all of the lancet kind. On the roof, at the east end, there is a stone cross - the token of which we are not to be ashamed - and on the opposite end is a raised niche for the bell. The whole building is of light but durable sandstone, well wrought. There is everything in this little church to remind the devout of the 'House of Prayer,' where our forefathers worshiped in England”.

"The inside is even more striking than the outside. No pains or expense have been spared. From end to end, from floor to roof, all is complete. Everything has been done which the servant of God should do to build a temple meet for the worship of Him who dwelleth in the heavens. The pulpit, the reading desk, and the seats, are all of dark wood, well wrought and varnished. The roof is open and lofty. The rafters are of dark varnished wood, like the seats. The church is beautifully adapted for the voice. The lowest tones are perfectly audible in the furthest corner."

"The site of the church is on a rising ground, not very far from Montacute House. The ascent has been made easy by a carriage drive and bridge. Some high rocks rise perpendicularly above the hill on which the church stands, and these, bold and protecting, throw an air of peace and stillness around, a very pleasant atmosphere for a church."

The Hallett familyhase owned Montacute since 1897; they, like Langdon, had come from Montacute in Somerset.

=== Rathmore ===
Rathmore is a single-storey sandstone house with an attic, built by convicts in a transitional style. The house is located on a knoll and has a sandstone paved verandah and an iron roof.

The 2,650-acre estate was established by Henry Boden Torlesse, a Lieutenant in the Navy who had served in the Napoleonic Wars, who had arrived in Hobart in 1828 and served as the manager of Montacute until 1834. He built Rathmore around 1830. The house is named after his wife, Frances Hawthorn's, mother's family property in Ireland. Torlesse's own family had become wealthy through investments in the East India Company.

Torlesse was forced to mortgage Rathmore in 1837 and sell it shortly after, to Mr George Cartwright, a Hobart lawyer. Cartwright became insolvent and the property was again sold, this time to the Allwright family, who owned the estate for over 150 years

In 2015, Rathmore was sold and converted into a guesthouse.

=== Sherwood ===
Sherwood is a Georgian sandstone house with associated sandstone outbuildings constructed in 1842 for John Sherwin, a settler from Staffordshire. It is located on land that was part of 800 acres on the Clyde River granted to Sherwin in 1823 and replaced a previous timber house, which was burned to the ground in 1830 during a raid by the indigenous Big River people in the Black War conflict.

The house has a hipped iron roof and impressive front door with sidelights and arched fanlight set into the three bay north-west facing facade, which looks up along the adjacent river. The extensive outbuildings include a kitchen, bakery, coach house, barn, and freestanding cottages. It has a cellar that runs below the house and back into the hill. The house is set within a deep valley of the Clyde River on an old road that ran along the river to Bothwell.

The house was described by Michael Sharland in his 1952 book Stones of a Century:

"It was difficult to account for his (John Sherwin) taste so far as it concerned the situation of his home. Here was a stately house hidden in the depths of a narrow valley, almost in the nature of a gulch, on the edge of a river subject to flooding, and with access presenting difficulties for the transport of the day ... But if, like Langdon, he expected the fertile valley to bring further settlement and neighbours, he was disappointed, for Sherwood has remained isolated and concealed by the folded hills for nearly 120 years."

In March 1843, bushranger Martin Cash, along with two accomplices, occupied and robbed Sherwood during a robbery spree in the Hamilton area, tying up all the occupants, including George Sherwin and three visitors in one room while they searched the property for valuables. Cash's own account of the incident refers to the house as a garrison and gives an indication of the number of people required to run and maintain the property:

"While luxuriating in our present encampment we resolved upon paying a friendly visit to Mr. Sherwin, of Sherwood, whom we considered able, if not willing, to contribute to the funds; and intending if possible to secure one of the men in his employment, in order to ascertain the strength of the enemy, we fixed upon a convenient place, where, with the assistance of a good field telescope I could see the most vulnerable part of the garrison, and thereby arrange the plan of attack."

"On joining Kavanagh, we both escorted our formidable body of prisoners into the house and placed them in the company of their betters, but in a very humble position, as we obliged them to sit upon the floor, and from information received from one of our captives, I repaired to the garden, where I found two men who all this time had been perfectly ignorant of what was taking place at the house, and having placed them also in company with the rest, I was satisfied that we had all hands in safe custody, and a numerous body they appeared, the room being scarcely large enough to contain them, being twenty-five in number."

In 1845, John Sherwin's other son Isaac returned to Sherwood from Launceston and directed the construction of one of the first irrigation systems in Tasmania, a 137m long tunnel cut by hand with pick and shovel through sandstone.

The house was restored in the 1970s by the Sandy Bay Scouts, but has not been consistently lived in since the 1950s.

=== Strathborough ===
Strathborough is a two-storey Georgian style house built sometime between 1827 and 1832. It was constructed with convict labour on land granted to siblings Joseph and Sarah Bradbury who had come to Van Diemen's Land on the Minerva with their mother in 1822. The Bradbury's had first been granted 2,000 acres of land in Hollow Tree in 1823 by Lieutenant Governor Sorell and successfully applied to Governor George Arthur for a further five acres, on which to construct a home, in 1825. Joseph and Sarah Bradbury both died in 1857. The property was then leased to Thomas Axford. The name Strathborough first appears in 1882. From at least 1883 to William Sprackett Hallet leased the Strathborough, he then purchased the property with his brothers Frederick and Isaac in 1911, they already owned Llanberis and Montacute. In 1914 William took Strathborough. The house itself has since been sold separately from the original property that surrounds it.

The house is constructed of pale ashlar sandstone and has five bays with a central front door. There are stylistically uncharacteristic buttresses at either end of the front of the house, indicating that the front facade may have been rebuilt at some stage, with the buttressing necessary for structural stability. The roof is a shallow pitched double hip, with four symmetrical chimneys. There is a single storey scullery with its own chimney at the rear of the building. The original floors are Tasmanian oak with original joinery in cedar.

Strathborough was sold in 2017. In 2019 a renovation was completed by Core Collective architects for the new owners, which in 2020 won both the Tasmanian Architecture Award for Heritage Architecture and the highest Australian National Architecture Award for Heritage Architecture.

== Geography ==
The Clyde River forms the north-western boundary before flowing through to the south-west.

== Road infrastructure ==
The B110 route (Hollow Tree Road) enters from the north and runs through to the south, where it exits. Route C181 (Marked Tree Road) starts at an intersection with B110 and runs south-east until it exits.
