= Interlaken Lakeside Reserve =

Coordinates: 42°09′00″S 147°10′00″E

Designations

Ramsar Wetland
- Official name: Interlaken Lakeside Reserve
- Designated: 16 November 1982
- Reference no.: 259

The Interlaken Lakeside Reserve is a wetland reserve at subalpine Interlaken, lying at the north-western end of Lake Crescent on the Interlaken isthmus between the reservoirs of Lakes Sorell and Crescent, about 20 km west of Tunbridge, in the Central Highlands of Tasmania, Australia. In 1982 it was designated a wetland of international importance under the Ramsar Convention.

== Description ==
The 520 ha Ramsar site is about one third open water and one third dry land, with the remaining third consisting mainly of Triglochin procera – Baumea arthrophylla marshland. Wetland conditions depend on management of water levels in Lake Crescent, which receives water from Lake Sorell and supplies it to the Clyde River for irrigation in the Clyde Valley.

The site is one of three known localities in Tasmania for the sedges Scirpus mantivagus and Isolepis montivaga, and for the swamp wallaby grass Amphibromus neesii. It is also important for waterfowl, especially black swans, for feeding, nesting and resting, as well as serving as a drought refuge. Lake Crescent supports a population of golden galaxias. Human activities include livestock grazing, sport fishing and duck shooting.
