= Elderslie =

Elderslie may refer to one of the following locations:

- Elderslie, Scotland, a village in Renfrewshire, west central Scotland
- Elderslie, New South Wales, a suburb of Sydney, Australia
- Elderslie, Tasmania, a rural locality in Tasmania, Australia
- Arran-Elderslie, a municipality in Ontario
- Elderslie, a rural community in St. Elizabeth Parish, Jamaica
