= Lake Crescent (Tasmania) =

Lake in Tasmania, Australia

- Location within Tasmania
- Location: Interlaken Lakeside Reserve, Midlands, Tasmania
- Coordinates: 42.18°S 147.17°E
- Type: natural
- Primary inflows: Lake Sorell
- Primary outflows: Clyde River
- Catchment area: 214 square kilometres (83 sq mi)
- Basin countries: Australia
- Max. length: 7 kilometres (4.3 mi)
- Max. width: 5 kilometres (3.1 mi)
- Surface area: 23 square kilometres (8.9 sq mi)
- Average depth: 1.5 metres (4 ft 11 in)
- Max. depth: 2.4 metres (7 ft 10 in)
- Surface elevation: 803.8 metres (2,637 ft)
- Settlements: Interlaken

Lake Crescent is a man-made reservoir in the eastern side of the Midlands region of Tasmania, Australia, approximately 100 kilometres (62 mi) north of Hobart.

Lake Crescent is the main home for the golden galaxias Galaxias auratus. Carp, Cyprinus carpio, were discovered in the lake in 1995, but were eradicated using innovative techniques. Ramsar is an internationally significant wetland game reserve. The short-finned freshwater eel (Anguilla australis) used to migrate to Lake Crescent from the ocean. However its movement has been impounded by dams on the River Derwent, and mesh screens on the Clyde River to limit the movement of carp. The Inland Fishers Service has been stocking elvers into the lake to sustain a commercial eel fishery. Other fish that are stocked and fished from the lake are brown trout and rainbow trout.

There is one boatramp into the lake accessed from Lake Crescent Road. Other roads in the vicinity are Interlaken Road C527, Dennistoun Road C528, and Laycock Drive. The closest camping ground is at Dago Point on Lake Sorell. Named features on the western side of the lake are Teatree Point, Andrews Bay, Big Bay, Jacks Point. The southern edge is called Table Mountain Shore. The eastern side has coastlines called Boathouse Shore, and Sandbank Shore terminating at Triffitt Point. Lakeside Island is in the northern part.

The Interlaken Waste Transfer Station is on Dennistoun Rd.
