= Dysart, Tasmania =

Dysart Tasmania
- Coordinates: 42°34′52″S 147°10′53″E
- Population: 216 (2016 census)
- Postcode(s): 7030
- Location: 46 km (29 mi) SW of Oatlands
- LGA(s): Southern Midlands
- Region: Central
- State electorate(s): Lyons
- Federal division(s): Lyons
Localities around Dysart:
Bothwell	Kempton	Kempton
Hollow Tree	Dysart	Bagdad
Hollow Tree	Elderslie, Pelham, Bagdad	Bagdad

Dysart is a rural locality in the local government area (LGA) of Southern Midlands in the Central LGA region of Tasmania. The locality is about 52 kilometres (32 mi) north of Hobart and 46 kilometres (29 mi) south-west of the town of Oatlands. The 2021 census recorded a population of 252 for Dysart.

== History ==
Dysart was gazetted as a locality in 1970. Until about 1875 the area was known as Shepton Monacute. The name Dysart was given to the Parish in 1836. It was taken from the property “Dysart Park”, which may have been named for Dysart in Scotland.

== Geography ==
Many of the boundaries are survey lines.

== Road infrastructure ==
National Route 1 (Midland Highway) passes through from south-east to north-east, while route C185 (Clifton Vale Road) provides access to the interior of the locality.
