= Charles Rowcroft =

British pastoralist and novelist (1798–1856)

Charles Rowcroft (1798 – 23 August 1856) was a British pastoralist and novelist. He was the son of diplomat Thomas Edward Rowcroft.

== Biography ==
Born in 1798, in London, Rowcroft was educated at Eton College, after which he moved to Hobart Town in Australia, in 1821, and took up a grant of 2,000 acres (8 km^{2}), near Bothwell, where he and his brother Horace (Horatio Nelson Rowcroft) were among the first European settlers. In 1822, he was made a justice of the peace. He was also a member of the committee of the Agricultural Society of Van Diemen's Land and an original shareholder of the Van Diemen's Land Bank. He unsuccessfully applied for the position of colonial secretary in 1823. In 1824, he was sued, successfully, for "criminal conversation", by Edward Lord, with damages of £100 awarded against Rowcroft. In 1826, he returned to England.

In 1827, Rowcroft bought a boarding school in Streatham, London. In 1843, he published Tales of the Colonies, the first Australian novel of the immigrant genre, followed by The Bushranger of Van Diemen's Land (1846). Another of his novels, An Emigrant in Search of a Colony (1851), is also connected with Australia. In 1852, Rowcroft was appointed the first British consul to Cincinnati. He sailed from New York to return to England on 17 August 1856, but died at sea on 23 August. He was married with five children.
