= Maria Lord =

Australian convict and entrepreneur

Maria Lord (c. 1780 - 22 July 1859), also known as Maria Risley or Riseley, was an Australian convict and entrepreneur.

== Early life and transportation ==
Maria Riseley was born in England c. 1780 to Robert and Mary Riseley. In August 1802 she was sentenced at the Surrey assizes to seven years' transportation for stealing from a dwelling house. She reached Sydney on 24 June 1804 aboard the convict transport the Experiment.

Almost exactly twelve months later, on 25 June 1805, she gave birth to a daughter, Caroline Maria Risley, whose father was recorded as John Thompson. Contemporary accounts suggest that some time in the second half of 1805 she was chosen from a line-up of women at the Parramatta Female Factory to become the convict servant of the well-to-do marine officer Edward Lord, who had travelled from Hobart to Sydney to 'find a wife'. Maria and baby Caroline arrived in Van Diemen's Land in November 1805. Between 1806 and 1819 she and Edward Lord had eight children together. They married in 1808, after she was granted a free pardon.

== Business activities in Van Diemen's Land ==
When Maria arrived in Hobart in 1805 she brought with her "a quantity of trading goods" and soon established a shop. After Edward Lord resigned his commission in 1812, he engaged in trading, land acquisition and hotels and became one of the richest people in the colony, while Maria expanded the retail business. During these years she played a "crucial" role in building up the import and export side of the family business and in re-investing their growing capital. She later did business in partnership with her brother John Riseley, who arrived in the colony as a free settler in 1819. She acted as Edward Lord's agent and managed his affairs with his power of attorney during his lengthy absences. By 1820, she reputedly controlled over a third of the resources in Van Diemen's Land, controlling the supply of wheat and meat and a portion of the profitable rum trade through monopolies. Historians including Lloyd Robson and Manning Clark have blamed the Lord family business, and the Lords' exploitation of the colonial tendering system, for the corruption of the Van Diemonian economy and the displacement of the earlier small settlers.

== Scandal and later years ==
From 1816 Edward Lord spent less and less time in Van Diemen's Land, taking frequent trips back to England. During these absences Maria acted as his business agent and played a prominent role in Hobart society. During these years she lived in Ingle Hall, where she hosted dinners and balls. Some time around 1822 she began spending time with Charles Rowcroft (later a well-known writer), a young English magistrate 14 years her junior who had recently arrived in the colony.

In August 1823, Edward Lord placed a notice in the Hobart Town Gazette revoking Maria's authority over the family business, and in October Maria left Hobart to live at the family's country estate in New Plains. In 1824 Edward successfully sued Charles Rowcroft for "criminal conversation" and was awarded 100 pounds in damages, in a trial widely covered by the colonial press. After the trial Edward left for England with their youngest daughter, then aged five. Maria returned to Hobart and opened a shop and a butchery; she also managed a boarding house in the 1830s, and eventually a small store in Bothwell. She lived her last years at "The Priory", a property at Bothwell. She died on 22 July 1859 and was buried in a family plot at St Mathew's cemetery, New Norfolk.

== Legacy ==
The historian Kay Daniels argued that both Maria and Edward Lord had been neglected by historians, and that Maria's life "illuminates a number of narratives which together make up the female convict experience in Australia".
