= Ratho Farm Golf Links =

Golf course in Bothwell, Tasmania

Club information
- Established: 1822; 204 years ago
- Type: public
- Total holes: 18
- Website: https://rathofarm.com/

Ratho Farm Golf Links is an 18-hole golf course that was constructed on the Ratho Farm in Bothwell, Tasmania.

== History ==
The first game of golf in Tasmania, and among the earliest games of golf in Australia, was played in Bothwell. The course at the Ratho property was until recently thought to be the oldest golf course in Australia, which was thought to have been built in the mid-1850s. Jane Williams, daughter of Ratho's first owner Alexander Reid, wrote in 1890 that golf was first played in the area sometime before 1860:

"...it (golf) was introduced over 30 years ago by Mr. William Wood, brother of Mr. Dennistoun Wood, of Dennistoun, and that it flourished as long as the Scottish element prevailed in the Bothwell district, when through death and other changes golf ceased to be practised in Bothwell."

Alexander Arthur Reid of Ratho, grandson of the above-mentioned Alexander Reid, wrote in 1930 that his father, Alexander Reid Jr., penned a letter written in the early 1860s stating that he was starting a golf club in Bothwell with 15 or 16 members. Arthur Alexander Reid also mentioned that he remembered the "queer-shaped old clubs."

The newly opened links at Ratho were reported in The Tasmanian Mail in August 1911:

"Mr and Mrs. Reid gave a golf afternoon on the newly laid-out Ratho links, at Bothwell, on Saturday, when a handicap mixed foursomes for trophies given by the host and hostess was played... The new course is a really excellent one, the turf being naturally suitable for golf, and the grass greens are all wonderfully good. Every hole has its difficulties, and the spoiling nature of the course adds to its attractiveness. The length of the course (9 holes) is 2,551 yards.

Golf in Australia started at Grose Farm in Sydney, with the first reliably documented match played in 1839 by A.B. Spark.

Bothwell is home to the Australian Golf Museum, housed in the sandstone former school house.

== See also ==
- List of links golf courses
- List of oldest companies in Australia
- Golf in Australia
