= Pelham, Tasmania =

Pelham Tasmania
- Coordinates: 42°34′29″S 147°00′54″E
- Population: 33 (2016 census)
- Postcode(s): 7030
- Location: 17 km (11 mi) E of Hamilton
- LGA(s): Central Highlands, Southern Midlands
- Region: Central
- State electorate(s): Lyons
- Federal division(s): Lyons
Localities around Pelham:
Hollow Tree	Hollow Tree, Dysart	Elderslie, Dysart
Gretna, Hamilton	Pelham	Elderslie
Gretna	Gretna	Elderslie

Pelham is a rural locality in the local government areas (LGA) of Central Highlands and Southern Midlands in the Central LGA region of Tasmania. The locality is about 17 kilometres (11 mi) east of the town of Hamilton. The 2016 census recorded a population of 33 for the state suburb of Pelham.

== History ==
Pelham was gazetted as a locality in 1970. The name was in use for a parish in the 1820s.

== Geography ==
Most of the boundaries are survey lines.

== Road infrastructure ==
Route C182 (Pelham Road) passes through from west to east.
