= Golf Australia =

Governing body for the sport of golf in Australia

- Logo Golf Australia
- Sport: Golf
- Jurisdiction: National
- Abbreviation: (GA)
- Founded: 2006
- Affiliation: International Golf Federation (IGF)
- Regional affiliation: Asia-Pacific Golf Confederation
- Headquarters: Australian Golf Centre
- Location: Sandringham Golf Links, Cheltenham Road Cheltenham, Victoria 3192
- Chairman: Peter Margin
- Board members: Peter Margin (Chairman), Richard Allen, David Brett, Sarah Chia, Jeannene O'Day, John Robinson, Wendy Machin, John Davis, Kelly Reynolds
- CEO: James Sutherland

Official website
- www.golf.org.au
- (Australia)

Golf Australia is the governing body for the sport of golf in Australia, formed in 2006 after the Australian Golf Union (AGU) and Women's Golf Australia (WGA) agreed to merge. The decision, which was formally ratified at a meeting in Melbourne in August 2005, was made after the Australian Sports Commission threatened to withdraw its financial support unless the two bodies amalgamated. The Australian Sports Commission contributed approximately A$1.5 million annually to the Australian Institute of Sport for golf funding.

Colin Phillips, the AGU's executive director since 1978, retired from his position in 2005, claiming that the way the decision to merge had been forced upon the sport by the federal government, had been a factor in his decision.

Following the merger, IMG, the sports marketing company which organises the Australian Open golf event, signed a three-year deal which increased its ties to Golf Australia. Former tennis pro and new Open chairman Paul McNamee also renegotiated a deal signed by the old AGU, whereby the tournament would be hosted at the Moonah Links course in Rye, Victoria three times in every five years. That decision had been heavily criticised by golf professionals who found issue with the course layout, low attendances and poor corporate interest, but the new organisation was able to reduce its obligation to three tournaments before 2020.

Golf Australia runs the Australian Open and the Women's Australian Open, the premier male and female golf tournaments in Australia, as well as the Australian Amateur and other national amateur events. It also runs programs promoting golf in Australia, the two major being the MyGolf for juniors and the Crown Lager Social Golf Club. Minjee Lee and Jason Day have been ambassadors for MyGolf, and Stuart Appleby has been an ambassador for the Crown Lager Social Golf Club.

Golf Australia supports the state associations Golf New South Wales, Golf Northern Territory, Golf Queensland, Golf South Australia, Golf Tasmania, Golf Victoria & Golf Western Australia who are responsible for the governance, delivery and direction of golf in their State.

The Golf Australia National Squad is the key component of the countries High Performance program which supports talented young golfers. Squad members have included Geoff Ogilvy, Karrie Webb, Adam Scott, Aaron Baddeley, Michael Sim and Katherine Hull.

With golf being readmitted back into the Olympic fold at the 2016 Summer Olympics, the role of Golf Australia was strengthened further. As part of this the Australian Sports Commission raised the funding to the sport in April 2013.

Golf Australia is the official handicapping authority in Australia, and provides all the necessary software to golf clubs and golfers throughout the country. Prior to the launch of the World Handicap System in 2020, GA owned and operated its own handicapping system.

== National Squad ==
Golf Australia supports elite amateurs golfers, through the Australian National Squad. Golf Australia also runs a Rookie Program assisting professional golfers as they enter their professional careers. The program is part of Golf Australia's broader initiative to promote and develop the sport of golf in the country. In addition to the National Squad, Golf Australia also operates a Rookie Program, which provides support to professional golfers at the beginning of their careers. The Golf Australia National Squad and the Rookie Program are integral parts of Golf Australia's efforts to foster talent and promote the sport of golf in Australia. They provide a platform for amateur and professional golfers to practice their skills and compete at the highest levels of the sport.

Australian National Squad members have included Geoff Ogilvy, Karrie Webb, Adam Scott, Aaron Baddeley, Michael Sim and Katherine Hull.

== See also ==
- Golf in Australia
- Australian Open
- Women's Australian Open
- Australian Amateur
- Australian Women's Amateur
- Australian Boys' Amateur
- Australian Girls' Amateur
- Australian Golf Foundation
