= Golf in Australia =

- Country: Australia
- Governing body: Golf Australia
- National team: Australia

International competitions
- World Golf Championships

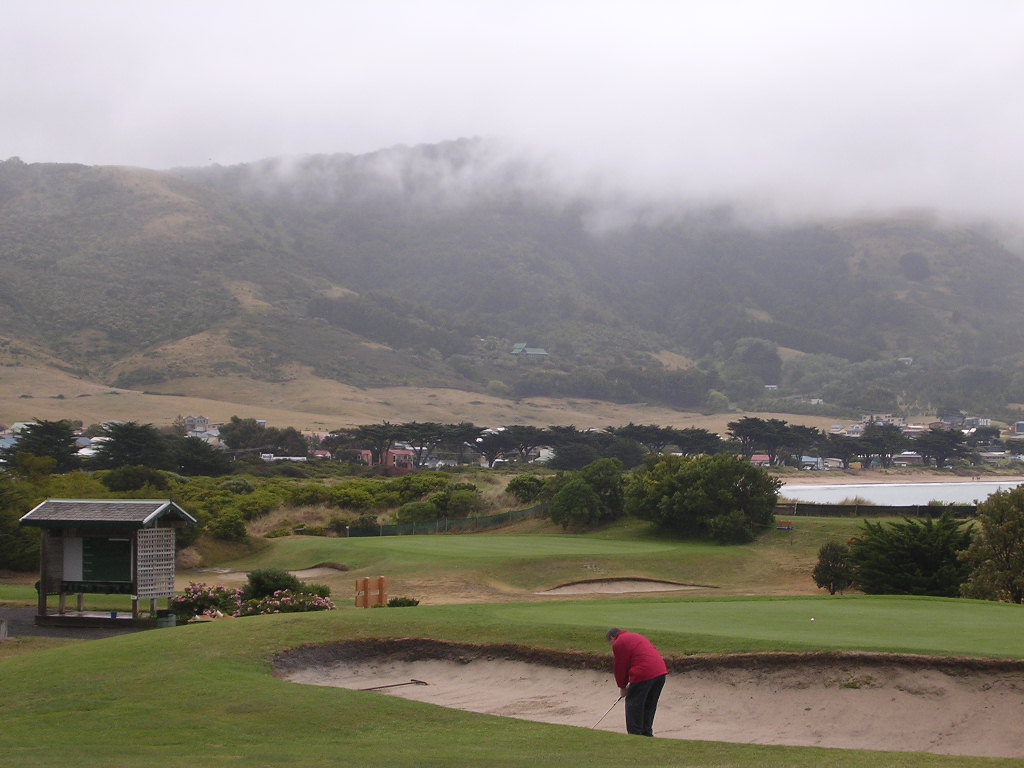
A golf course at Apollo Bay, Victoria

Golf has been played in Australia since 1839. The Professional Golfers Association (PGA) Tour of Australasia is the main men's tour in Australia. In women's golf, the ALPG Tour has operated since 1972.

== Governing body ==
Golf Australia is the national sporting body that runs golf in Australia. It was formed in 2006 as a merger of the Australian Golf Union (AGU) and Women's Golf Australia (WGA). The state golf associations are Golf New South Wales, Golf Northern Territory, Golf Queensland, Golf South Australia, Golf Tasmania, Golf Victoria and Golf Western Australia.

== Tournaments ==
The PGA Tour of Australasia is the main men's tour in Australia. It was founded in 1973 as the PGA Tour of Australia, and changed to its current name in 1991. The tour is one of the five charter members of the International Federation of PGA Tours, making it a 1st tier tour. In 2007 the tour had a schedule consisting of 12 events, but only three of them were sole-sanctioned by the PGA Tour of Australasia. The PGA Tour of Australasia's development tour is the Von Nida Tour.

Australia's premier golf tournament and national Open is the Australian Open, run by Golf Australia, which has been held since 1904. Other tournaments include the Australian PGA Championship, which has been held since 1929, and the Australian Masters, held from 1979 to 2015.

In women's golf, the ALPG Tour has operated since 1972. It became a member of the International Federation of PGA Tours in 2009 when that organisation expanded to include all of the major women's tours. In its most recent season, 2011–12, the tour consisted of 12 events. The two richest are respectively the Ladies Masters, held since 1990, and the Women's Australian Open, held since 1974. Both events are co-sanctioned with the Ladies European Tour, and since the 2012 edition, the Women's Australian Open has also been co-sanctioned by the U.S. LPGA Tour.

In addition to regular tournaments, Australia has hosted the 1998 Presidents Cup, 2001 WGC-Accenture Match Play Championship, 2007 Lexus Cup, 2011 Presidents Cup and 2013 World Cup of Golf. The 2016 World Cup of Golf was scheduled to be played in Melbourne.

Australia's top golfers, whether male or female, generally move to more lucrative tours—the European Tour or the U.S. PGA Tour for men, and the Ladies European Tour or the U.S. LPGA Tour for women—at the first opportunity.

The Australian Amateur Championships for men and women is the premier amateur event in Australia run by Golf Australia. Hundreds of golf clubs across Australia also participate in nationally organised amateur events at their local clubs. The most popular are Handiskins (Individuals), and the Volkswagen Scramble (Teams), where amateur golfers with varying handicaps compete at club-sanctioned events for club prizes and qualification to contest national championships.

== History ==
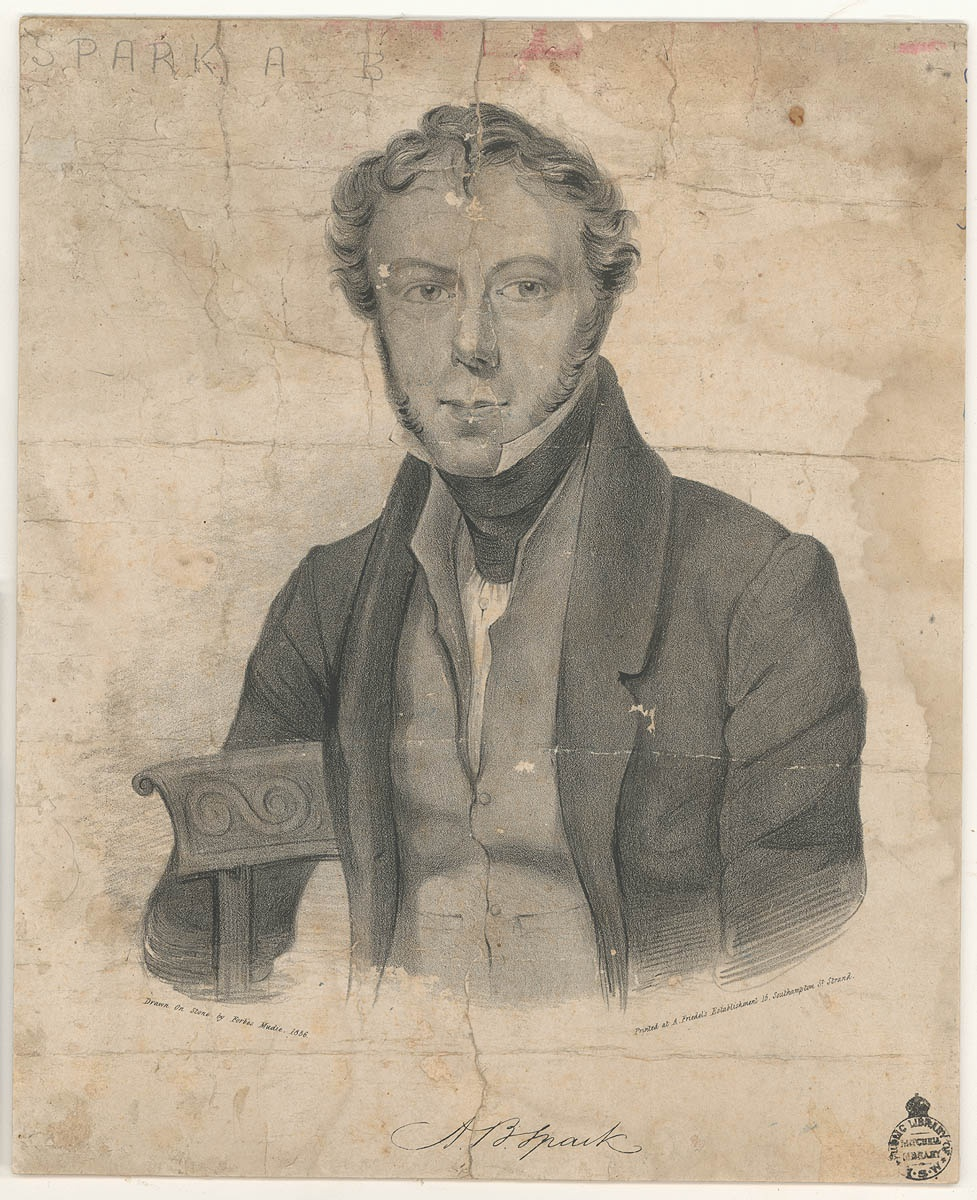
Alexander Brodie Spark

There are several claims for the earliest golf played in Australia. To date, there is only one claim with contemporaneous evidence. This primary source evidence comes from ten entries in 1839 in the diary of Alexander Brodie Spark. These show that golf was played in 1839 at Grose Farm, which is now part of urban Sydney. Spark and his friends instituted the New South Wales Golf Club on 1 June 1839, but the Club and the golf at Grose Farm had very short lives and there is no direct connection to the current New South Wales Golf Club. Spark was a wealthy merchant, a well-connected and well-respected member of colonial society, and can be considered as a reliable witness. Golf at Grose Farm was strongly influenced by the Royal Blackheath Golf Club in England.

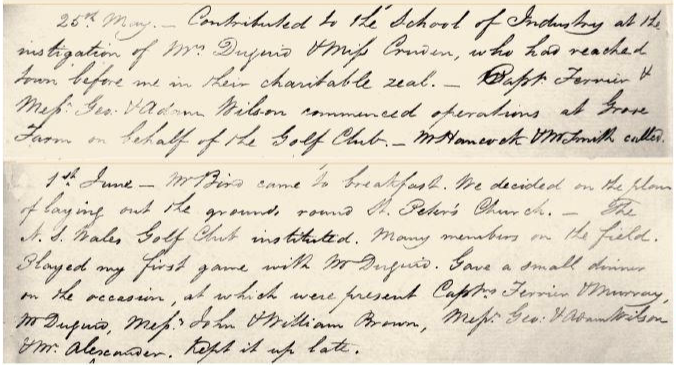
Alexander Brodie Spark Diary Extract

The NSW Golf Club (no continuous connection to the present NSWGC) and Grose Farm are the first golf club and first golf course in Australia. The oldest club and course in continuous existence are different. Determining them is difficult and there is no consensus. The oldest continuous surviving club is believed to be The Australian Golf Club in Sydney. The members met as an informal club in 1882/83 and the Club was formally constituted in 1884, but the Club lost its home course from 1888 to 1895. They may or may not have played elsewhere. They continued to exist as a legal entity by keeping their bank account open and in credit. When they resumed playing, at a new course in Queens Park, they played for the same trophies as in 1884. Their Cadogan Cup is the oldest golf trophy played for in Australia.

As a result of The Australian Golf Club's lack of a course for a period, the Royal Melbourne Golf Club maintain that they are the oldest golf club in Australia 'without interruption'. Other claims are made for early golf played at the Ratho estate at Bothwell, Tasmania, though these are now believed to relate to the Bothwell district in general in the 1860s. Contemporary evidence dates the Ratho course to the early 20th Century.

Apart from the references below, The Brassie of February 2015 and November 2015, contains articles with further on early golf history in Australia.

== Players ==
Australians have won a total of 27 majors in men's and women's competitions. Some notable players include:

- Kel Nagle – won the 1960 Open Championship. Was inducted into the World Golf Hall of Fame in 2007.
- Greg Norman – ranked #1 in the world for 331 weeks. Inducted into the World Golf Hall of Fame in 2001.
- Geoff Ogilvy – winner of the 2006 U.S. Open. Has been ranked as high as #4, in 2009.
- Adam Scott – first achieved a ranking of 3rd in early 2007; reached World #1 from May 2014 to August 2014 after becoming the first Australian to win the (U.S.) Masters.
- Jan Stephenson – won three LPGA majors in the early 1980s.
- Peter Thomson – won The Open Championship five times. Inducted into the World Golf Hall of Fame in 1988.
- Norman Von Nida – one of the first successful Australian golfers.
- Karrie Webb – the only golfer to have won five separate events recognised as majors by the LPGA. Qualified for the World Golf Hall of Fame in 2000; inducted in 2005.
- Jason Day – won the 2015 PGA Championship, and was ranked as the World #1 from 27 March 2016 to 18 February 2017.
- Minjee Lee - won the 2022 U.S. Women's Open, earning her $1.8 million, the largest payday to date in women's golf history.

== See also ==
- Golf Australia National Squad
- Australian Open
- Women's Australian Open
- Australian Amateur
- Australian Women's Amateur
- Australian Boys' Amateur
- Australian Girls' Amateur
