= Bagdad, Tasmania =

Bagdad
- Town
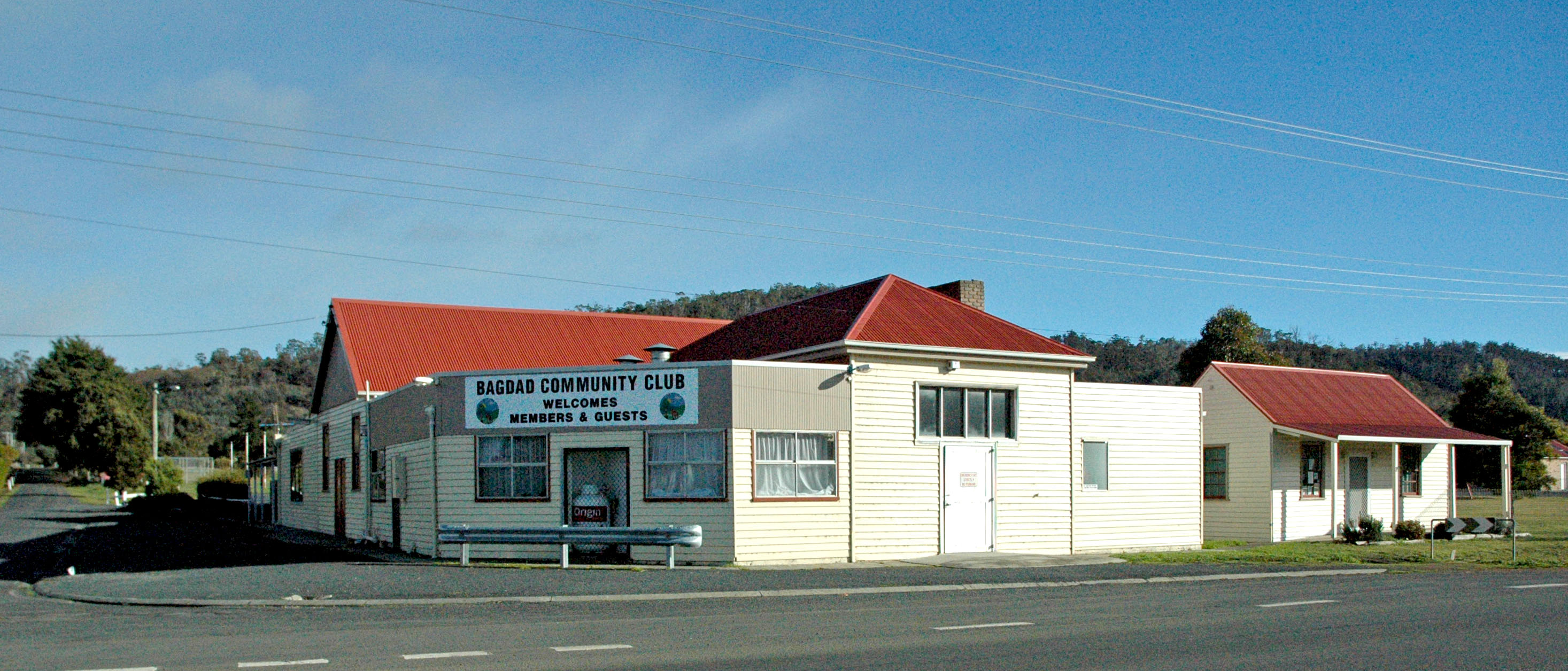
- Bagdad Community Club

- Coordinates: 42°37′S 147°13′E
- Country: Australia
- State: Tasmania
- LGA: Southern Midlands Council
- Location: 37 km (23 mi) N of Hobart; 12 km (7.5 mi) N of Brighton

Government
  - State electorate: Lyons
  - Federal division: Lyons

Population
  - Total: 1,482 (2021 census)
- Postcode: 7030
- Website: Bagdad
Localities around Bagdad
| Bothwell | Dysart | Colebrook |
| Dysart, Kempton | Bagdad | Colebrook |
| Dysart | Mangalore | Colebrook |

Bagdad is a rural locality and town in the local government area of Southern Midlands in the Midlands region. It is 37 kilometres (23 mi) from the north of Hobart, Tasmania.

In the days of the horse and buggy, Bagdad was an important rest area and horse-changing place for those continuing their journey up Constitution Hill. It is now an area of orchards and small mixed farms and a commuter settlement.

== History ==
The town was named by the explorer Hugh Germain, a private in the Royal Marines. He was said by James Backhouse in his book "A Narrative of a Visit to the Australian Colonies", published in 1901, to carry two books in his saddlebags while traveling: the Bible and the Arabian Nights, which he used as inspiration when he named places.

Bagdad Post Office opened on 1 December 1878.

A railway line connected the town with Hobart from 1891 until 1947.

In April 2003, during the early part of the Iraq war, the town's website was bombarded by confused internet users from around the world trying to contact Iraqis.

== Demographics ==
The 2021 Census by the Australian Bureau of Statistics counted 1482 people in Bagdad on census night. Of these, 51.5% were male and 48.5% were female.

The majority of residents (87.9%) are of Australian birth, with another 2.2% from England.

The age distribution of Bagdad residents is comparable to that of the greater Australian population. 66% of residents were aged 25 years or over in 2021, compared to the Australian average of 69.8%; and 34% were younger than 25 years, compared to the Australian average of 30.2%.

== Community ==
=== Schools ===
Bagdad Primary School was established on 14 January 1867 with a total of 22 students. On 26 January 1954, a fire destroyed the school's three classrooms, forcing the pupils to attend temporary schooling at the Bagdad Community Hall. The original headmaster's house survives as a classroom for kindergarten students.

== Road infrastructure ==
National Highway 1 (Midland Highway) runs through from north-east to south-east with central slip lanes in the middle of the highway.
