= Xanthoparmelia jarmaniae =

Scientific classification
- Kingdom: Fungi
- Division: Ascomycota
- Class: Lecanoromycetes
- Order: Lecanorales
- Family: Parmeliaceae
- Genus: Xanthoparmelia
- Species: X. jarmaniae

Binomial name
- Xanthoparmelia jarmaniae Elix & Kantvilas (1995)
- Type locality: near Kempton, Tasmania

Species of lichen-forming fungus

Xanthoparmelia jarmaniae is a species of foliose lichen in the family Parmeliaceae. It was formally described in 1995 from specimens collected near Kempton, in dry eucalypt woodland in south-eastern Tasmania. It forms small, rosette-shaped patches with narrow lobes (the leaf-like edges), a pale yellow-green upper surface, and cylindrical isidia (tiny outgrowths) with brown tips. It grows on sandstone in low-rainfall areas and is currently known only from the place where the original specimens were collected.

== Taxonomy ==
Xanthoparmelia jarmaniae was described as a new species by John Elix and Gintaras Kantvilas from specimens collected in Tasmania. The holotype (the single reference specimen for the name) was collected on sandstone rocks in Eucalyptus woodland along Clifton Vale Road, west of Kempton, at about 200 m elevation. The authors named the species in honour of the Tasmanian lichenologist S. Jean Jarman. Among Australian species, it most closely resembles X. mougeotina. Both have small lobes, cylindrical isidia with syncorticate (cortex-covered) tips, and a black lower surface. However, X. jarmaniae is less tightly attached to the rock and differs in chemistry (norstictic and salazinic acids rather than the stictic-acid group typical of X. mougeotina). Outside Australia, the South American X. mixteai is also similar, but its isidia are more globose and unbranched, and its chemistry differs (including gyrophoric and protocetraric acids).

== Description ==
The lichen body (the thallus) forms small rosettes 1–3 cm across and lies closely against the rock. The margins are foliose (leafy), but the centre can become almost crustose (crust-like). The lobes are narrow (about 0.5–1.5 mm wide) and usually radiate from the centre like a star; they rarely meet and they do not overlap. The lobe tips are distinctly notched. The upper surface is pale yellow-green and often darkens to yellow-brown or black in the centre. It is flat to slightly concave and shiny near the lobe tips. Older central parts become dull and irregularly cracked, eventually breaking into a crust-like, areolate centre (cracked into small patches). Asexual propagules are limited to isidia: tiny (roughly 0.1–0.2 mm) cylindrical outgrowths that start simple, then become moderately branched, with brown tips and syncorticate (cortex-covered) apices. Soredia and maculae (pale patches) are absent. The inner layer (the medulla) is white. The lower surface is black to dark brown, smooth and shining, with sparse simple black rhizines (root-like holdfasts). Sexual fruiting bodies (apothecia) and pycnidia were not seen in the specimens used for the original description. In standard spot tests, the cortex is K+ yellow (usnic acid). The medulla is K+ (yellow then red), C−, KC−, and P+ (yellow-orange). The major lichen substances are norstictic and salazinic acids, with consalazinic acid as a minor component.

== Habitat and distribution ==
When first described, it was known only from the type locality in south-eastern Tasmania. The area lies in a low-rainfall zone (roughly 500–600 mm annually) with extensive dry sandstone bluffs and dry sclerophyll (hard-leaved) forest. It grows on sandstone outcrops in open Eucalyptus woodland. The district is of interest to lichenologists because it supports several species otherwise unrecorded in Tasmania, including Pyxine nubila, Melanelia piliferella, Xanthoparmelia exillima and X. rubrigenas. In July 2005, Xanthoparmelia jarmaniae was listed as vulnerable under Tasmania's Threatened Species Protection Act 1995, and it was recorded primarily from dry eucalypt forest.

== See also ==
- List of Xanthoparmelia species
