= Elderslie, Tasmania =

Elderslie Tasmania
- Coordinates: 42°37′25″S 147°04′09″E
- Population: 149 (2016 census)
- Postcode(s): 7030
- Location: 30 km (19 mi) SE of Hamilton
- LGA(s): Central Highlands, Southern Midlands
- Region: Central
- State electorate(s): Lyons
- Federal division(s): Lyons
Localities around Elderslie:
Pelham	Dysart	Dysart
Pelham	Elderslie	Dysart, Bagdad
Gretna	Broadmarsh	Broadmarsh

Elderslie is a rural locality in the local government areas of Central Highlands and Southern Midlands in the Central region of Tasmania. It is located about 30 kilometres (19 mi) south-east of the town of Hamilton. The 2016 census determined a population of 149 for the state suburb of Elderslie.

== History ==
Elderslie was gazetted as a locality in 1970.

== Geography ==
The Jordan River flows through from north-east to south-east, forming small sections of the northern and southern boundaries as it enters and exits.

== Road infrastructure ==
The C185 route (Elderslie Road) enters from the south-east and runs through the village to exit in the north-east. Route C182 (Pelham Road) starts at an intersection with C185 in the village and runs north-west until it exits. Route C183 (Bluff Road) starts at an intersection with C185 in the south-east and runs generally south-west until it exits.
