= Thomas Edward Rowcroft =

British diplomat and merchant (1769–1824)

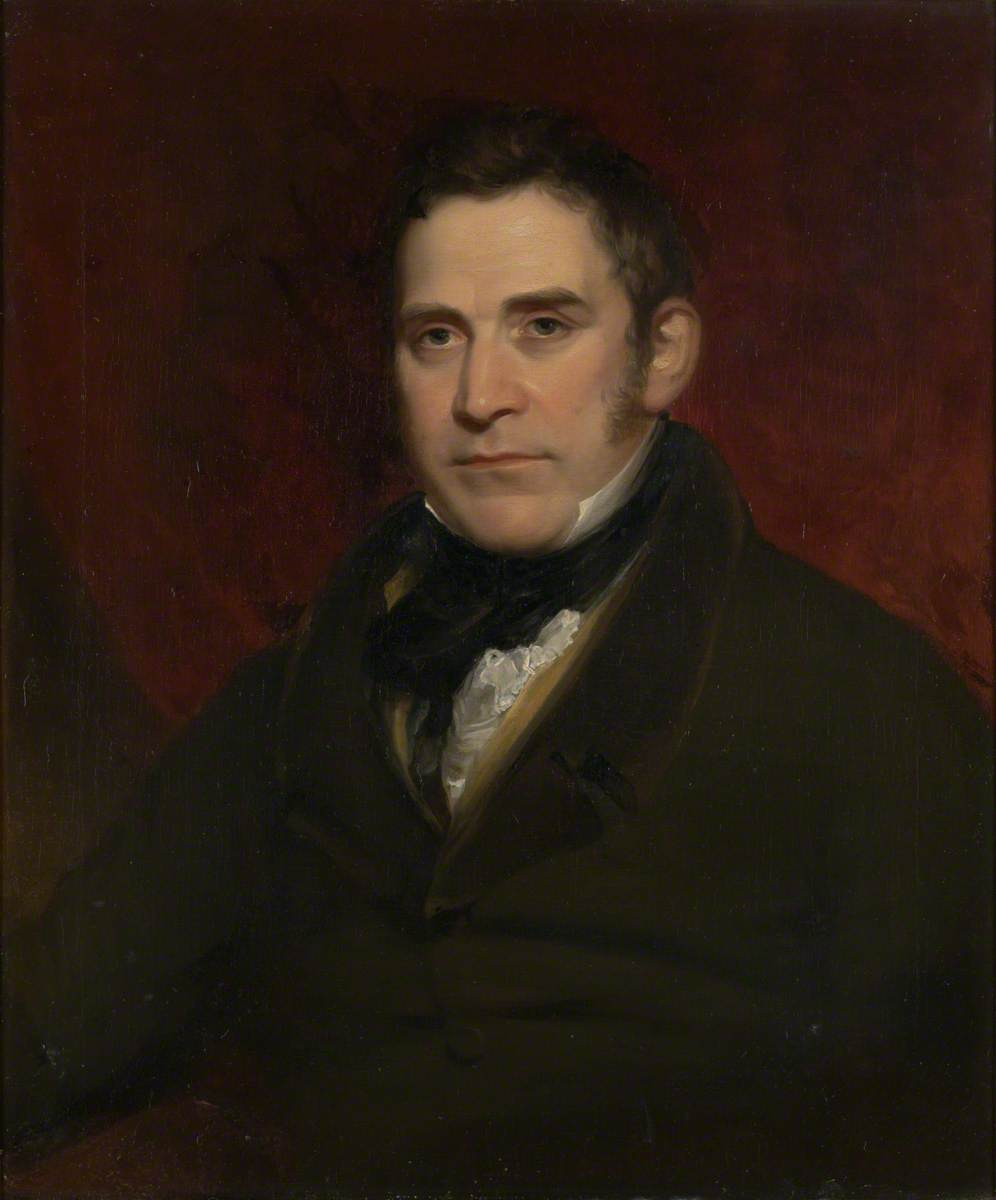
Thomas Rowcroft, painting by Henry Howard

Thomas Edward Rowcroft (3 September 1769 – 7 December 1824) was a prominent English merchant and an alderman of the City of London. He was heavily involved in benevolent outreaches such as the Subscription for the Irish Famine, the Waterloo Subscription for the families of soldiers killed during the Napoleonic Wars, and various literary and artistic societies.

Rowcroft was appointed by Foreign Minister George Canning as the first British diplomatic representative in Peru. On June 8, 1824, he arrived in Lima as consul general, accompanied by his daughter, Leonora Maria. His son and writer Charles was in Tasmania, Australia, which he left in the Cumberland in September 1825. Another son, Horatio Nelson Horace Rowcroft, was also farming in Tasmania at the time.

At this time, Lima was temporarily in the power of the royalists. Conditions in the city were awful. However, shortly after Rowcroft's arrival, Simón Bolívar returned to Lima from the interior and the Spanish retreated to Castle of Real Felipe. Rowcroft decided to go to Callao, the port of Lima, to deliver letters to HMS Cambridge under Captain Thomas James Maling and arranged for a safe pass through the royalist lines. On the return from his visit he handed in his safe pass but, as his coach left the outpost, it was struck by a hail of bullets. Rowcroft was wounded in the hand and the torso and died on 7 December 1824 at the home of a British merchant. Leonora was taken on board HMS Cambridge. The consul was buried on Saturday morning 11 December 1824 on San Lorenzo Island, off the coast from Callao. Captain (later Rear-Admiral) Thomas Maling was the chief mourner.

There is now little doubt that Rowcroft was accidentally shot by the Independents under Simon Bolivar. It is said that the royalist officer who gave him the safe pass had, unbeknownst to Rowcroft, written a death sentence on it. His daughter returned to England the following year after disposing of her father's goods and married Alfred Samuel Robinson, a lieutenant in the Royal Navy, on 4 December 1827.

At Markham College, Rowcroft House is the only house not named after a military figure.
