= Golf Queensland =

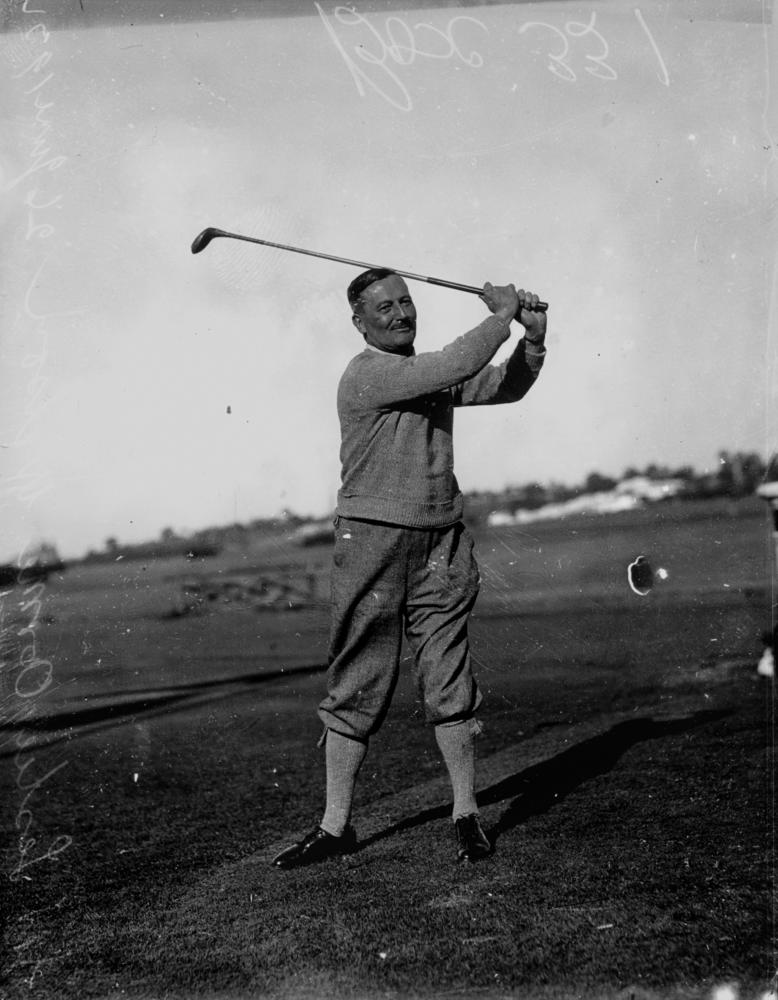
Queensland Governor, Sir Leslie Orme Wilson, playing golf, 1932

Golf Queensland is the organisation responsible for the governance, delivery and direction of golf in Queensland, Australia.

== History ==
The first golf known to be played in Queensland involved Francis Ivory (Member of the Queensland Legislative Assembly for Burnett from 1873 to 1878) and his brother Alexander Ivory, who laid out a few holes on their Eidsvold pastoral station in the 1880s.

The first golf club formed in Queensland was the North Queensland Golf Club which was established on 2 August 1893 at Kissing Point in North Ward, Townsville, but was renamed the Townsville Golf Club in 1894. The next were Toowoomba Golf Club in August 1896 and a few months later Brisbane Golf Club in November 1896. Other clubs quickly followed: Ipswich in 1897; Bundaberg, Rockhampton and Victoria Park (in Brisbane) in 1898, and Gladstone in 1899.

The Queensland Golf Union was formed in 1914. Golf Queensland was established in July 2007 from the merger of Queensland Golf Union and Women's Golf Queensland.

== See also ==
- Golf Australia
- Sport in Queensland
