= Bothwell, Tasmania =

Bothwell
- Town
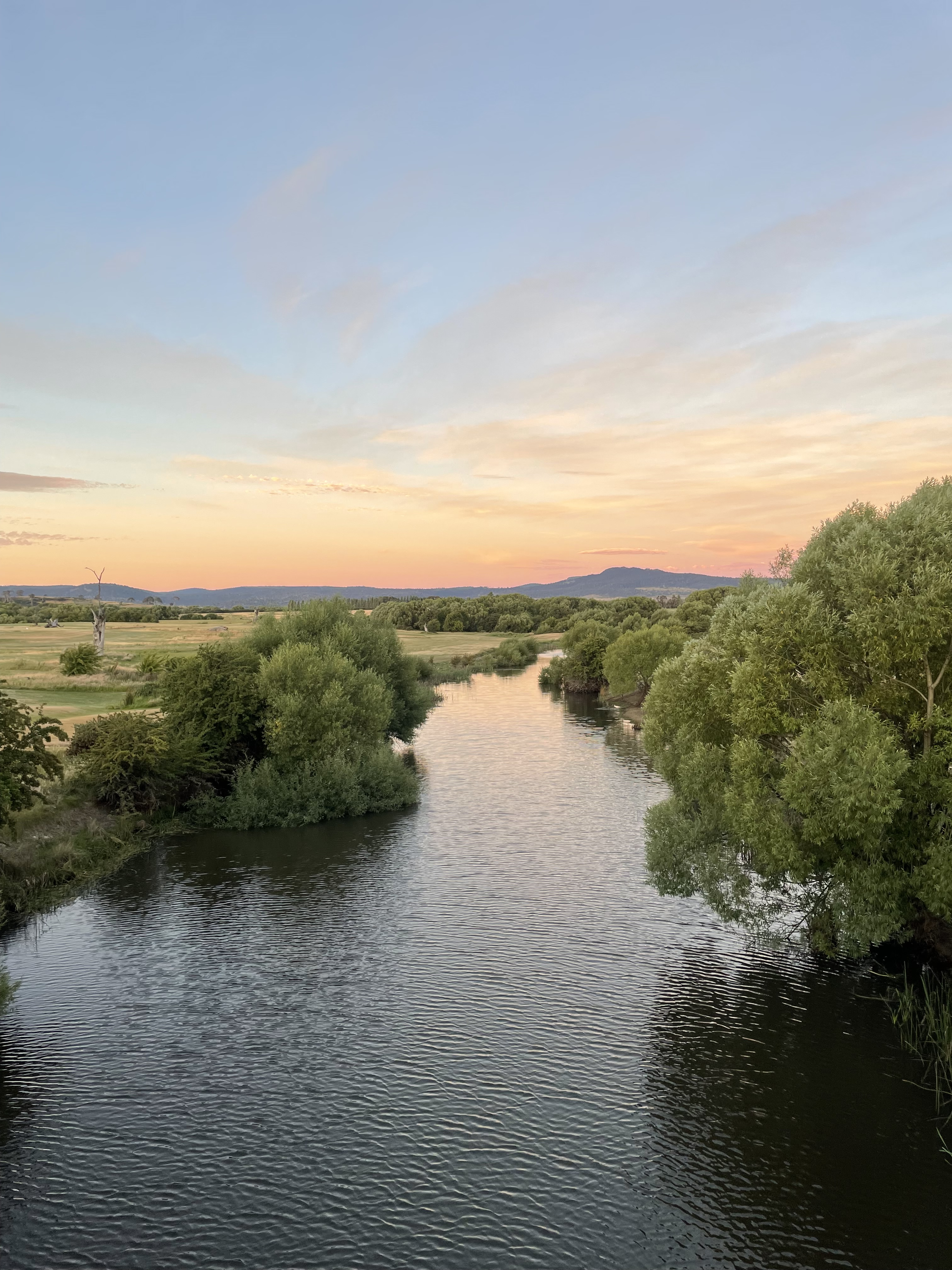
- View north-east along Clyde River in Bothwell, Tasmania

- Coordinates: 42°23′S 147°00′E
- Country: Australia
- State: Tasmania
- LGA: Central Highlands Council
- Location: 76 km (47 mi) N of Hobart; 51 km (32 mi) NW of Brighton; 16 km (9.9 mi) W of Melton Mowbray

Government
  - State electorate: Lyons
  - Federal division: Lyons
- Elevation: 352 m (1,155 ft)

Population
  - Total: 499 (2021 census)
- Postcode: 7030
- Mean max temp: 16.6 °C (61.9 °F)
- Mean min temp: 3.9 °C (39.0 °F)
- Annual rainfall: 541.7 mm (21.33 in)

Bothwell, Tasmania is a small town with a population at the 2021 census of 499. Situated in central Tasmania on the River Clyde in a broad valley, it is notable for hunting and being a lake district. It is part of the municipality of Central Highlands Council and celebrated the bicentenary of its founding in 2022. Nearby locations include Hollow Tree, Hamilton, Ouse and Kempton.

The citation for Bothwell in the Australian Register of The National Estate describes Bothwell as:

"... an agricultural settlement on the Clyde River, set in a modified landscape, surrounded by low naturally vegetated hills. Consistently it is a loose grid plan settlement with large lot sizes. Civic details include avenue plantings and Queens Square. Dense pine plantings occur en route to the showground. Important homesteads occur on the west side of the river. It has two village centres, with fine churches and cemeteries grouped about Queen's Square. The general character of the town is one of looseness, internal open spaces being important, with consistent architecture generally in good condition. The settlement is important for its formal layout which is emphasised by continuing civic consciousness in building and landscape."

== History ==
For many thousands of years before European colonisation, the Bothwell area was the home of the Big River peoples, who migrated seasonally between the mountains and the coast. Led by Tongerlongerter, they fiercely resisted the occupation of their territory, as part of what is known as the Black War.

Bothwell traces its formal founding to 1822, when several families of Scottish origin settled in the area that was to become the town. It was named after Bothwell in Lanarkshire, Scotland.

It was laid out in 1824 by surveyor Thomas Scott, with a more detailed plan designed in 1837 allocating space for a market place, school, police, magistrate and parsonage. The town extended as far east as the blocks on the east side of Kent Street and north to Alexander Street. A further plan was drawn up in 1900, the town had by then extended further east to William Street and north to Elizabeth Street and the market place now named as Queen's Square. The school was granted a larger site in this plan, between Mary and Michael Streets, where it is located currently.

The heritage registered hotel at the corner of William and Patrick Streets, currently called The Castle Hotel, dates from 1829 and is the second oldest continuously licensed hotel in Tasmania.

St Luke's Presbyterian, now Uniting, Church opened in 1831. It faces east and is prominently located on Market Place adjacent to Queen's Square, at the end of Alexander Street. It was used by both Anglicans and Presbyterians until the Anglican church, St Michael and All Angels, opened in 1889.

Bothwell Post Office opened on 1 June 1832.

For some years after 1848, Bothwell was the place of exile of the Irish nationalist leaders John Mitchel and John Martin; their lodging Mitchel's Cottage still stands on the Nant property.

Bothwell was also the site of a radio telescope, built in the 1960s, in nearby Dennistoun, by one of the pioneers of radio astronomy, Grote Reber.

=== Golf ===
The first game of golf in Tasmania, and among the earliest games of golf in Australia, was played in Bothwell. The Ratho Farm Golf Links was, until recently, believed to be the oldest golf course in Australia, and was thought to have been built in the mid-1850s. Jane Williams, daughter of Ratho's first owner Alexander Reid, wrote in 1890 that golf was first played in the area sometime before 1860:

"...it (golf) was introduced over 30 years ago by Mr. William Wood, brother of Mr. Dennistoun Wood, of Dennistoun, and that it flourished as long as the Scottish element prevailed in the Bothwell district, when through death and other changes golf ceased to be practised in Bothwell."

Alexander Arthur Reid of Ratho, grandson of the above-mentioned Alexander Reid, wrote in 1930 that his father, Alexander Reid Jr., penned a letter written in the early 1860s stating that he was starting a golf club in Bothwell with 15 or 16 members. Arthur Alexander Reid also mentioned that he remembered the "queer-shaped old clubs."

The newly opened links at Ratho were reported in The Tasmanian Mail in August 1911:

"Mr and Mrs. Reid gave a golf afternoon on the newly laid-out Ratho links, at Bothwell, on Saturday, when a handicap mixed foursomes for trophies given by the host and hostess was played... The new course is a really excellent one, the turf being naturally suitable for golf, and the grass greens are all wonderfully good. Every hole has its difficulties, and the spoiling nature of the course adds to its attractiveness. The length of the course (9 holes) is 2,551 yards.

Golf in Australia started at Grose Farm in Sydney, with the first reliably documented match played in 1839 by A.B. Spark.

Bothwell is home to the Australian Golf Museum, housed in the sandstone former school house.

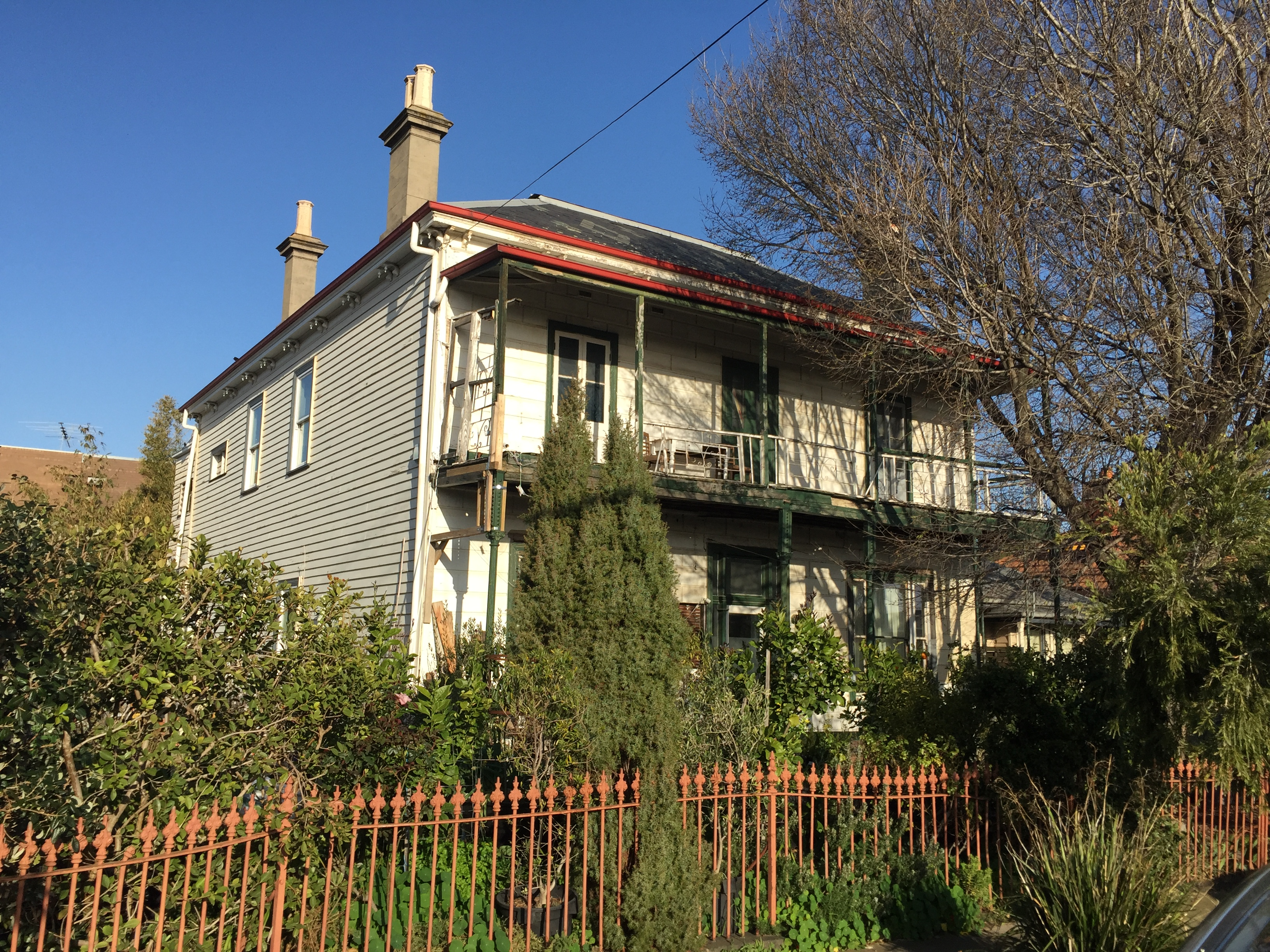
Indigenous Place

=== Bothwell Literary Society ===
Australia's first country-town literary society was established in Bothwell in 1834 as a debating society by the Scottish born minister Rev. James Garrett. The society built a meeting place in 1837, the same year that Sir John Franklin became its patron. In this building the society established one of Australia's earliest public libraries. John Mitchel wrote about the library in 1852, stating that:

"Bothwell has a very tolerable public library, such library as no village of similar population in Ireland had."

The library's last major acquisition was in 1892, when the MLC for Derwent, Walter Gellibrand, donated 81 books. In 2017, the Queen Victoria Museum and Art Gallery in Launceston acquired the full collection of the library.

== Architecture ==
Bothwell features several distinctive styles of architecture, including Georgian, Queen Anne Revival and Victorian. It has many buildings listed on the Tasmanian Heritage Register, Register of the National Estate and the National Trust, from stone cottages to churches.

=== Wentworth House ===
One of the larger houses is the two storey Georgian Wentworth House, located on Wentworth Street on the west side of the Clyde River. Construction, at a cost of £560 was started in 1830 by convict builders, for Captain, later Major, D'Arcy Wentworth, brother of explorer William Wentworth, and one of Bothwell's early police magistrates. The house was originally called Inverhall and was single storey. The house was further added to by Major Charles Schaw, an assistant police magistrate in Bothwell, at a cost of £4000. The citation in the Australian Register of the National Estate describes Wentworth as:

"A very unusual two storey Georgian house... Main north facade has off-centre portico with grouped casement windows flanked by pilasters to one side and a single window at level two to the other side. The east facade is possibly the most attractive, with three pairs of French doors with bracketed cornice and heavy 3 dormer window (with pilasters) above the eaves line. Central Decorative chimney. Fine garden and setting.

=== St Luke's ===
St Luke's is the second oldest Presbyterian church in Australia, the oldest being the Ebenezer Church in the Hawkesbury region of New South Wales, which is also the oldest extant church building in Australia. It is a sandstone Georgian style chapel, constructed between 1828–31 and designed by John Lee Archer. It has a square, Norman style tower with a castellated parapet, lancet windows and a Gothic doorway which was restored by the National Trust in 1968. Of particular interest are the carvings above the main doorway:

"Daniel Herbert, the genius convict stonemason-sculptor who carved the images on the sides of the bridge at Ross, is credited with creating these strange images which may depict a Celtic pagan god and goddess. Herbert was known for his droll sense of humour. If they are pagan it is amusing to note that Governor Arthur upon inspecting the church ordered the architect, John Lee Archer, to change the rounded windows because they were 'unchristian'."

=== Nant Mill ===
The Nant property was established by Edward Nicholas of Nant, Monmouthshire, Wales, in 1821. The Nicholas family were among the earliest European settlers in Bothwell. The buildings on the property comprise a homestead, outbuildings, cottage and mill.

The heritage registered watermill was built in 1857 and is powered by the waters of the Clyde River. It is a two-storey sandstone Georgian style building. There was an earlier mill on the property built in 1825, the only remnant of which is a brick barn adjacent to the 1857 building. In 2007 a significant restoration and conversion to a whiskey distillery were undertaken by noted Tasmanian architectural firm Circa Morris-Nunn.

== Demographics ==
Historical population
Year	Pop.	±%
1842	947	—
1870	1,300	+37.3%
1881	1,049	−19.3%
1891	1,482	+41.3%
1954	1,260	−15.0%
1981	782	−37.9%
1986	802	+2.6%
2001	337	−58.0%
2006	376	+11.6%
2011	391	+4.0%
2016	485	+24.0%
2021	499	+2.9%
Source: Australian Bureau of Statistics data and historical Tasmanian census returns.

Following a population peak in the late 19th century, Bothwell experienced a prolonged decline through much of the 20th century. Contemporary newspaper reporting attributed this trend to broader patterns of rural depopulation in Tasmania, including agricultural mechanisation, the consolidation of pastoral properties, and a reduction in labour requirements in sheep-grazing districts. Changes in transport and the centralisation of services in larger regional centres further reduced Bothwell’s role as a local service town during the mid-20th century, a pattern widely observed across Tasmania’s Central Highlands.

By the late 20th century, census data showed the town’s population had fallen substantially from its colonial-era peak, reaching a low point around the turn of the 21st century before stabilising and recording modest growth in the early 21st century.

At the 2021 Australian census, Bothwell had a population of 499 people. The median age of residents was 47 years, higher than the Tasmanian median of 42 and the national median of 38.

Bothwell has a comparatively high proportion of First Nations residents, with 7.2% of the population identifying as Indigenous Australians, exceeding both the Tasmanian and national averages.

The majority of residents were born in Australia (86.2%). The most common overseas countries of birth were England and New Zealand, each accounting for a small proportion of the population.

English was the predominant language spoken at home, with 96.0% of residents reporting English as their only language.

In the 2021 census, the most common religious response in Bothwell was no religion. Christian affiliations, including Anglicanism and Catholicism, accounted for the majority of remaining responses.

== Climate ==
Climate data for Bothwell
Month	Jan	Feb	Mar	Apr	May	Jun	Jul	Aug	Sep	Oct	Nov	Dec	Year
Record high °C (°F)	37.5 (99.5)	36.0 (96.8)	36.1 (97.0)	28.6 (83.5)	23.1 (73.6)	17.9 (64.2)	17.5 (63.5)	21.5 (70.7)	25.0 (77.0)	32.3 (90.1)	33.0 (91.4)	34.0 (93.2)	37.5 (99.5)
Mean daily maximum °C (°F)	22.5 (72.5)	23.2 (73.8)	20.6 (69.1)	17.6 (63.7)	13.5 (56.3)	10.9 (51.6)	10.6 (51.1)	11.7 (53.1)	13.6 (56.5)	16.9 (62.4)	18.4 (65.1)	20.4 (68.7)	16.7 (62.1)
Mean daily minimum °C (°F)	7.5 (45.5)	7.4 (45.3)	6.5 (43.7)	5.1 (41.2)	2.2 (36.0)	0.1 (32.2)	−0.2 (31.6)	0.6 (33.1)	2.2 (36.0)	3.8 (38.8)	5.6 (42.1)	6.7 (44.1)	4.0 (39.2)
Record low °C (°F)	−2.9 (26.8)	−3.6 (25.5)	−4.0 (24.8)	−7.0 (19.4)	−8.9 (16.0)	−12.5 (9.5)	−9.4 (15.1)	−6.9 (19.6)	−7.0 (19.4)	−7.7 (18.1)	−5.0 (23.0)	−3.1 (26.4)	−12.5 (9.5)
Average precipitation mm (inches)	37.7 (1.48)	37.7 (1.48)	37.2 (1.46)	45.8 (1.80)	42.0 (1.65)	42.8 (1.69)	44.5 (1.75)	49.0 (1.93)	46.9 (1.85)	52.4 (2.06)	50.9 (2.00)	50.4 (1.98)	536.9 (21.14)
Average precipitation days	8.0	7.2	8.3	9.7	10.8	11.6	12.7	13.1	12.6	12.6	11.8	10.2	128.6

== Notable residents ==
In alphabetical order by surname.

- Douglas Cashion Tasmanian politician and minister.
- John Frost chartist and convict, lived in Bothwell when he was assigned to W. Chester
- Keith Sydney Isles academic economist and vice chancellor of the University of Tasmania, born in Bothwell
- Maria Lord wealthy entrepreneur and convict, ran a shop in Bothwell and died in the town in 1859
- John Martin Irish nationalist leader and convict, lived in Bothwell with John Mitchell
- John Mitchel Irish nationalist leader and convict, lived in Bothwell with John Martin
- Harold Sprent Nicholas judge in the New South Wales Supreme Court, spent his childhood in Bothwell at his family property, Nant
- Sir Robert Officer politician and medical officer, lived in Bothwell
- Charles Myles Officer grazier and politician, lived in Bothwell
- Grote Reber radio astronomer, lived in Bothwell and constructed a radio telescope on the Dennistoun farm
- Charles Rowcroft novelist, one of the earliest settlers in Bothwell
- D'Arcy Wentworth Jr. soldier and politician, police magistrate of Bothwell
- William Weston 3rd Premier of Tasmania, lived in Bothwell for a time after his marriage to Ann Elphinstone, daughter of Captain William Clark of Bothwell
- John Dennistoun Wood Australian politician born at Dennistoun farm in Bothwell
