= Clyde River (Tasmania) =

River in Tasmania, Australia

Clyde
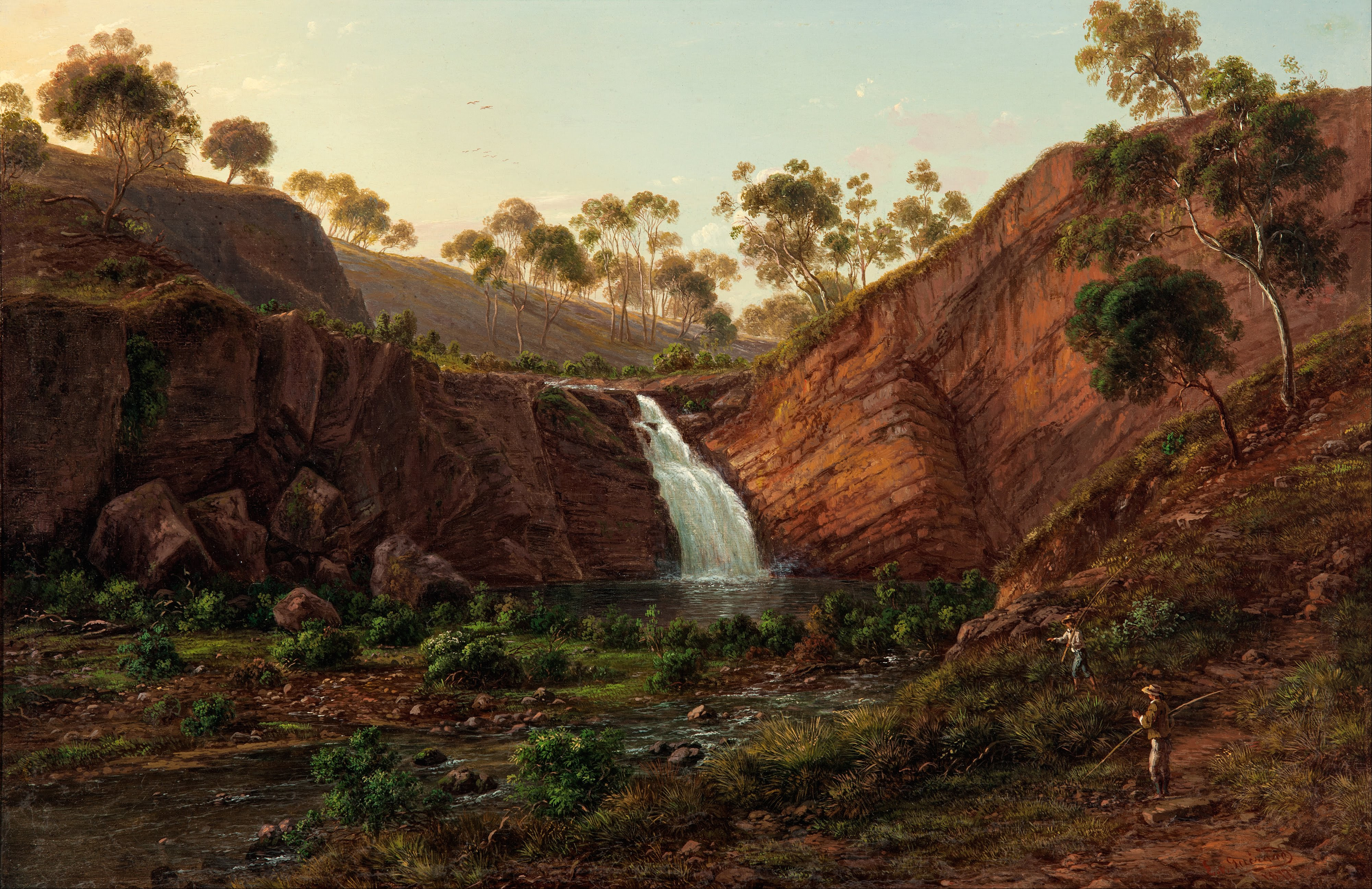

- Location of the Clyde River mouth in Tasmania

Location
- Country: Australia
- State: Tasmania
- Region: Midlands
- Settlements: Bothwell, Hamilton

Physical characteristics
- Source: Lake Sorrell and Lake Crescent
  - location: near Interlaken
  - coordinates: 42°56′S 146°7′E
  - elevation: 817 m (2,680 ft)
- Mouth: River Derwent
  - location: south of Hamilton
  - coordinates: 42°34′47″S 146°48′39″E
  - elevation: 73 m (240 ft)
- Length: 97 km (60 mi)
- Basin size: 1,120 km^{2} (430 sq mi)

Basin features
- River system: River Derwent catchment
- Reservoirs: Lake Sorell, Lake Crescent, Meadowbank Lake

The Clyde River, also known as the River Clyde, part of the River Derwent catchment, is a perennial river in the Midlands region of Tasmania, Australia.

== Course and features ==
The Clyde River rises in the reservoirs of Lake Sorell and Lake Crescent, near Interlaken and flows generally west by south, through the settlements of Bothwell and Hamilton, joined by nine minor tributaries before reaching its mouth and emptying into the River Derwent at Lake Meadowbank. The river drains a catchment area of 1,120 square kilometres (430 sq mi) in an agricultural region of Tasmania and descends 744 metres (2,441 ft) over its 97-kilometre (60 mi) course.

== See also ==
- Rivers of Tasmania
